= Imamate in Ibadi doctrine =

Imāmah (Arabic: إِمَامَة, romanized: imama) means "leadership" and the framework Ibadi theology holds which not many know as the Imamate is associated with Shiism, it is distinct that it is not hereditary nor tribal. It is a democratic meritocratic system where any Muslim who holds the necessary qualifications in merit in fields such as Islamic Jurisprudence or Ibadah (submission to God), and Piety may be elected as the Imam, its holders don't hold any divine attributes of infallibility or miracle working and is subjected to have mistakes just like any human being, this selection is held by Shura (consultation), where a group of senior scholars and community leaders evaluates candidates and reach consensus. Crucially, unlike what Shia groups like Twelvers or Ismailis attribute to their Imams. The Ibadi imam is not absolute or divine, if he deviates from religious justice or becomes a tyrant, the doctrine would outline a clear path of accountability, he will first counselled to reform, if that fails, the community may be able to depose him.

== Framework of Ibadi Imamate ==
in addition, the Ibadi Imamate has a unique structure not found in any other system of Imamate, to navigate various historical realities of Power and Persecution. Ibadi jurists developed the Doctrine of the four states of religion (Arabic: مسالك الدين, romanized: Masālik al-Dīn)

This system dictates how the community and leadership must adapt to the unpredictable political environment.

- State of Manifestation (Zuhur) The default, which occurs when the Ibadi community is strong, independent, and capable of openly establishing a state to enforce Sharia Law, and when the Ibadi community is open and prevalent.
- State of Defense (Difa') If the community is overwhelmed by an existential threat or tyrannical ruler, they enter the "State of Defense" stage. They elect a temporary wartime Imam to lead a small, dedicated force to protect the community and at best sabotage the enemy and make the enemy suffer by resistance.
- State of Secrecy (Kitman) When oppression becomes so absolute that open resistance is impossible, the community shifts into the "State of Secrecy" stage. They dissolve the open state and operate through an underground council of scholars to preserve the faith without provoking unnecessary bloodshed
- State of Hardship (Wukuf) This stage serves as a provisional stage to think for the future of the Ibadi community. Where the community pauses political or military action to carefully assess complex situations before deciding which stage to adapt. This pragmatic and flexible framework allowed Ibadi communities to survive and thrive, most famously seen in the Rustamid Dynasty in North Africa and the historical dynasty's in Oman

== History ==
Ibadism is a distinct school that formed uniquely from traditions outside Sunni or Shia, established by the followers of Jabir ibn Zayd and established a moderate school compare to what was around it with many Kharijites groups alive back then. And the Ibadi imamate it self developed more by later jurists until full codification to adapt with the fact they are the minority and to survive as an intellectual tradition

== Imams of Ibadis ==
A timeline of indicating Ibadi Imams every Ibadi Imam. The information is sparse so be little careful. (Cumlative sources:) this will include all legitimate 55 Omani Imams, all 8 North African Imams, and 4 Early Imams recognized according to Ibadi Doctirne.

=== Omani Imams. (749-1959 CE) ===
Early Ibadi Imams (749-1154 CE)

1. Al-Julanda ibn Masud (749-751 CE)
2. Muhammad ibn Affan (793-795 CE)
3. Al-Warith ibn Ka'ab (795-808 CE)
4. Ghassan ibn Abdullah (808-823 CE)
5. Abdul Malik ibn Humaid (823-840 CE)
6. Al-Muthanna ibn Jayfar (840-851 CE)
7. Al-Salt ibn Malik (851-886 CE)
8. Rashid ibn Al-Nazar (886-890 CE)
9. Azzan ibn Tamim (890-893 CE)
10. Muhammed ibn al-Hasan (897-898 CE)
11. Azzan ibn al-Hazbar (898-899 CE)
12. Abdullah ibn Muhammad (899-900 CE)
13. Al-Salt ibn al-Qasim (900 CE)
14. Al-Husn ibn Sa'id (900-904 CE)
15. Al-Hawari ibn Matraf (904-912 CE)
16. Umar ibn Muhammad (912-933 CE)
17. Muhammad ibn Yazid (Undated early 10th century [[circa]])
18. Al-Hakim ibn al-Mulla (933-939 CE)
19. Said ibn Abdullah (939-943 CE)
20. Rashid ibn al-Walid (943-953 CE)
21. Al-Khalil ibn Shadhan (1002-1050 CE)
22. Rashid ibn Said (1050-1053 CE)
23. Hafs ibn Rashid (1053-1054 CE)
24. Rashid ibn Ali (1054-1116 CE)
25. Musa ibn Jabir (1116-1145 CE)
26. Muhammad ibn Khanbash (1145-1154 CE)
27. Al-Khafaj ibn Amr (1154) Nabhani Dynasty (1406–1624)
28. Malik ibn Ali al-Hana'i (1406-1429 CE)
29. Al-Harawi ibn Abu Bakr (1429-1435 CE)
30. Abu al Hasan al Hana'i (1435-1451 CE)
31. Umar ibn al-Khattab al-Kharusi (1451-1489 CE)
32. Muhammad ibn Sulaiman al-Ya'rubi (1489-1490 CE)
33. Umar al-Sharif (1490-1500 CE)
34. Ahmed ibn Muhammed al-Rayami (1492-1493 CE)
35. Abul Hasan ibn Abul Hasan (1493-1500 CE)
36. Muhammad ibn Ismail al-Ismaili (1520-1529 CE)
37. Barakat ibn Muhammad (1529-1560 CE)
38. Abdullah ibn Muhammad al-Kharusi (1560-1596 CE)
39. Muhammad ibn Nasir al-Ghafri (1596-1610 CE)
40. Malik ibn Said (1610-1624 CE) Yaruba Dynasty (1624–1742 CE)
41. Nasir ibn Murshid (1624-1649 CE)
42. Sultan ibn Saif (1649-1679 CE)
43. Bil'arab ibn Sultan (1679-1692 CE)
44. Saif ibn Sultan (1692-1711 CE)
45. Sultan ibn Saif II (1711-1718 CE)
46. Saif ibn Sultan II (1718-1719 CE)
47. Muhanna ibn Sultan (1719-1720 CE)
48. Ya'arab ibn Bel'arab (1722-1723 CE)
49. Sultan ibn Murshid (1742-1743 CE) Al Bu Said & Reform Era (1744–1959 CE)
50. Ahmad ibn Said al-Busaidi (1744-1783 CE)
51. Said ibn Ahmad Al Busaidi (1783-1784 CE)
52. Azzan ibn Qais (1868-1871 CE)
53. Salim ibn Rashid al -Kharusi (1913-1920 CE)
54. Muhammed ibn Abdullah al Khalili (1920-1954 CE)
55. Ghalib al-Hinai (1954-1959 CE)

=== North African Imams ===
(The Rustamids 777-907)

1. Abd al-Rahman ibn Rustam (777-788 CE)
2. Abd al-Wahhab ibn Abd al-Rahman (788-824 CE)
3. Aflah ibn Abd al-Wahhab (824-872 CE)
4. Abu Bakr ibn Aflah (872-874 CE)
5. Muhammad Abul-Yaqzan ibn Aflah (874-894 CE)
6. Yusuf Abu Hatim ibn Muhammad First Reign: (894-895 CE) / Second Reign: (899-906 CE)
7. Yaqub ibn Aflah (895-899 CE)
8. Yaqzan ibn Muhammad Abul-Yaqzan (906-909 CE)

=== Proto Imamates & Early Revolts ===
Considered Imams by Ibadi doctrines.

1. Abdullah ibn Wahb al-Rasibi (657-658 CE)
2. Talib al Haqq (745-747 CE)
3. Abu Hamza al-Mukhtar (747-748 CE)
4. Abu al-Khattab al-Ma'afri (757-761 CE)
