= Omani Empire =

Omani maritime empire (1696–1856)

Omani Empire الْإِمْبَرَاطُورِيَّة الْعُمَانِيَّة (Arabic) Al-Imbraṭuriyyah Al-'Umāniyyah
- 1696–1856
- Flag

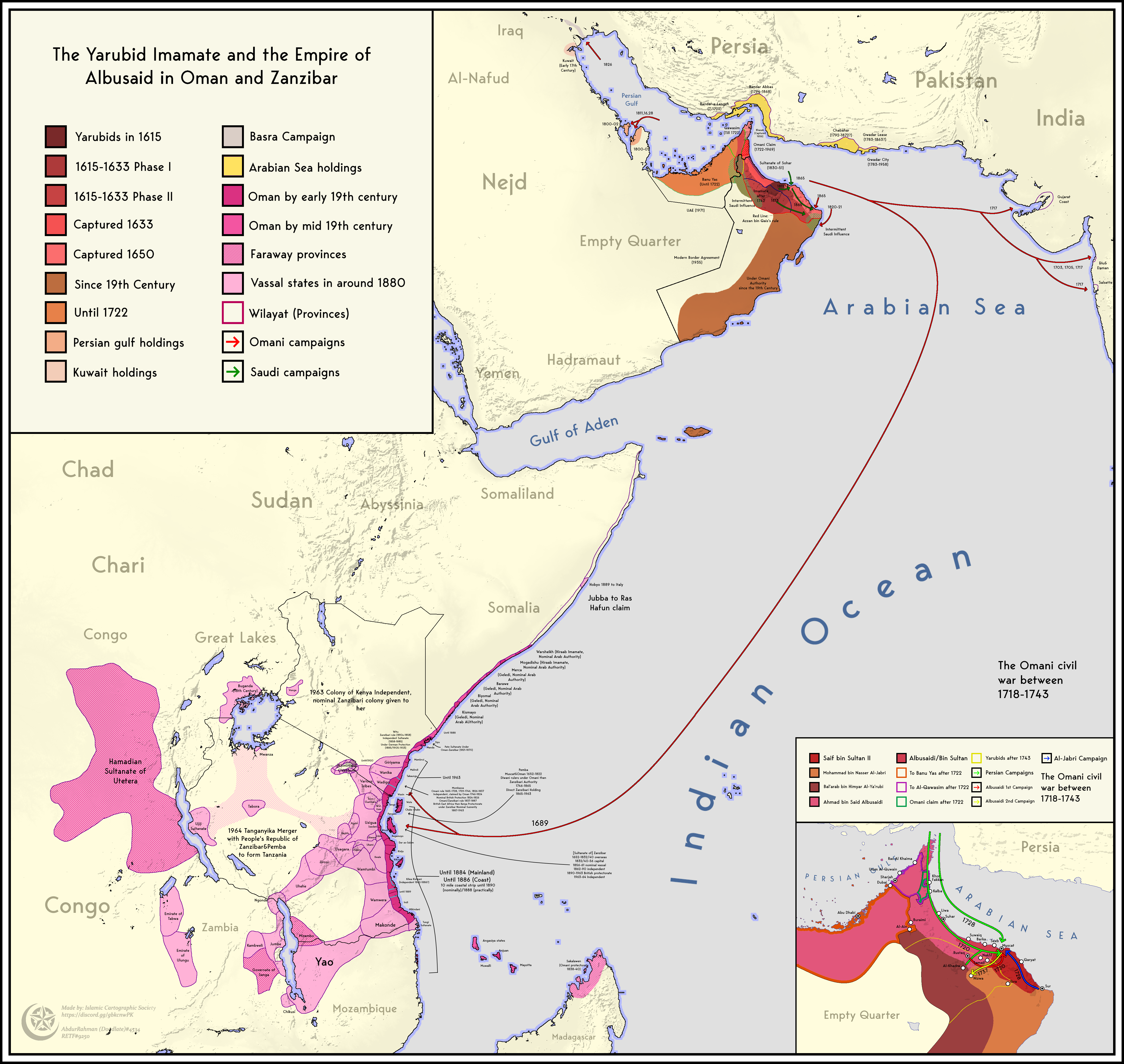
- Territorial evolution of the Omani Empire
- Capital: Rustaq (1692–1792); Muscat (1792–1832); Zanzibar (1832–1856)
- Common languages: Official: Arabic; Regional: Balochi; Persian; Swahili; English; French; Malagasy
- Religion: Dominant: Ibadi Islam (official); Minorities: Sunni Islam; Shia Islam; Christianity
- Demonym: Omani
- Government: Absolute monarchy
- Yaruba Dynasty
  - 1692–1711: Saif bin Sultan (first)
  - 1711–1718: Sultan bin Saif II
  - 1718–1719: Saif bin Sultan II
  - 1719–1720: Muhanna bin Sultan
  - 1722–1723: Ya'arab bin Bel'arab
  - 1724–1728: Muhammad bin Nasir
  - 1742–1743: Sultan bin Murshid
  - 1743–1749: Bal'arab bin Himyar
- Al Busaid Dynasty
  - 1744–1778: Ahmad bin Said
  - 1778–1783: Said bin Ahmad
  - 1783–1793: Hamad bin Said
  - 1792–1804: Sultan bin Ahmed
  - 1805–1806: Badr bin Seif
  - 1806–1856: Said bin Sultan (last)
- History
  - Occupation of Fort Jesus by Saif bin Sultan: 1696
  - Civil war in Oman: 1718
  - Persian invasion of Sohar: 1742
  - Al Busaid Dynasty took over: 1749
  - Division of the Omani Empire: 1856

Population
  - 1870 estimate: 367,400
- Currency: Dirham; Indian rupee; Maria Theresa thaler; Shilling
Preceded by	Succeeded by
Imamate of Oman; Kathiri	Muscat and Oman; Sultanate of Zanzibar

The Omani Empire (Note: Arabic: الْإِمْبَرَاطُورِيَّة الْعُمَانِيَّة, romanized: Al-Imbraṭuriyyah Al-'Umāniyyah) was a maritime empire, vying with Portugal and Britain for trade and influence in the Persian Gulf and Indian Ocean. After rising as a regional power in the 18th century, the empire at its peak in the 19th century saw its influence or control extend across the Strait of Hormuz to modern-day Iran and Pakistan, and as far south as Cape Delgado in what is now Mozambique. After the death of Said bin Sultan in 1856 the empire was divided between his sons into two sultanates, an African section (Sultanate of Zanzibar) ruled by Majid bin Said and an Asian section (Sultanate of Muscat and Oman) ruled by Thuwaini bin Said.

== History ==
=== Becoming a regional power ===
Muscat, which is located in a strategic location on trade routes, came under the control of the Portuguese Empire between 1507 and 1650. However, the Portuguese did not succeed in controlling Oman in its entirety. In mid-17th century, the Omani tribes were able to end the Portuguese presence in Muscat.

In 1696, under the reign of Saif bin Sultan, an Omani fleet attacked Mombasa, besieging the Portuguese Fort Jesus, in which 2,500 civilians had taken refuge. The siege of the fort ended after 33 months when the garrison, dying of hunger, surrendered to the Omanis. By 1783, the Omani Empire had expanded eastwards to Gwadar in present-day Pakistan. The Omanis also continued attacking Portuguese bases in western India but failed to conquer any. In the north, the Omanis moved into the Persian Gulf, taking Bahrain from the Persians, holding it for several years. The expansion of Omani power and influence southwards included the first large-scale settlement of Zanzibar by Omani migrants.

=== Ya'rubid Dynasty ===
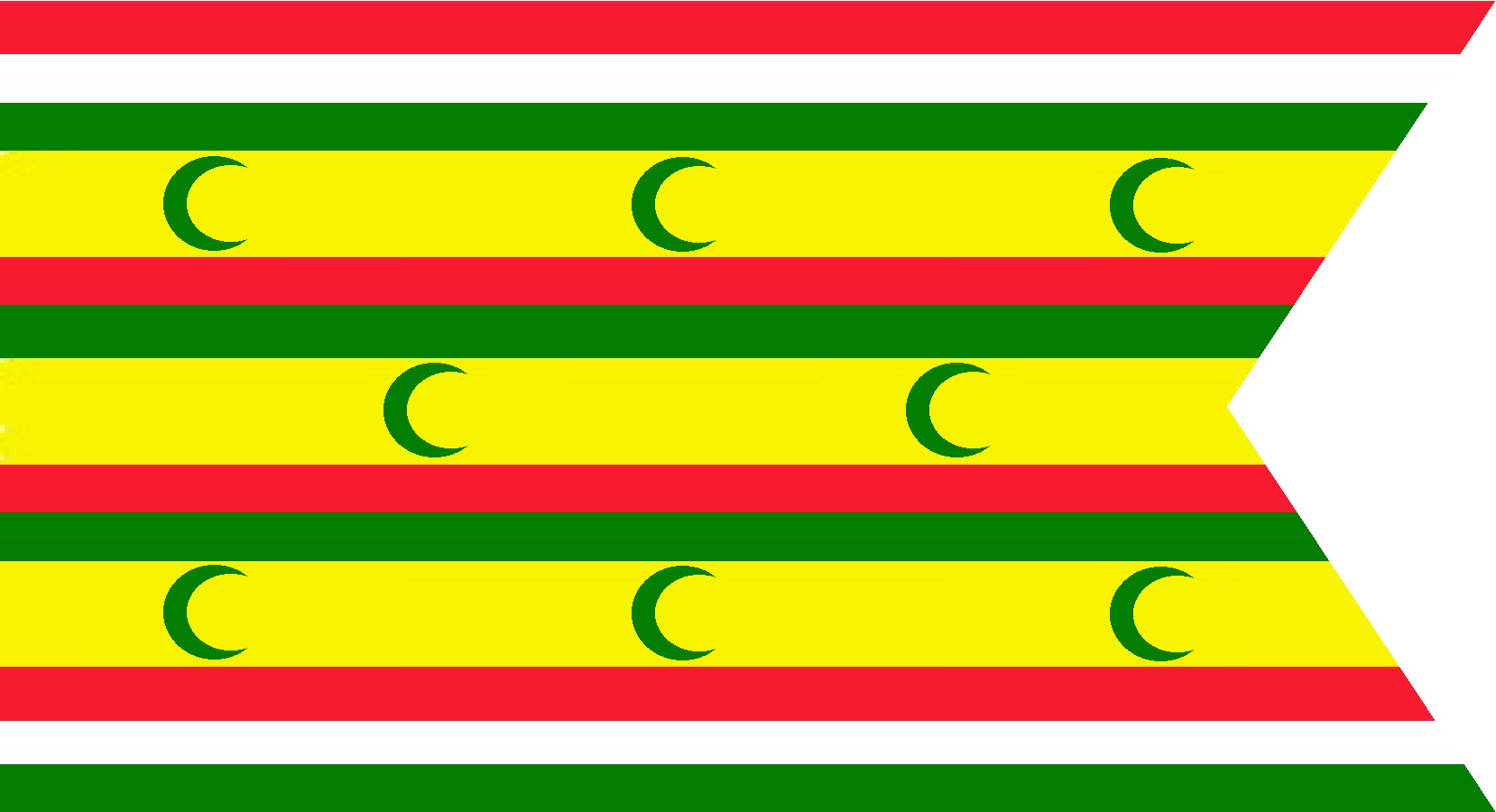
Ya'rubids' ensign illustration

The Ya'rubids (1624–1719) managed to construct a powerful and well-organized state after the Portuguese had disrupted Arabian maritime trade in the region. The Portuguese encroachment which had engulfed the area in an economic crisis was challenged by the Omanis, where the latter managed to restore their traditional role as local maritime traders. Along with this, significant economic and political developments took place.

The agriculture in Oman had undergone a massive improvement under Saif bin Sultan. He is known for providing water to the interior lands of Oman, while he encouraged Omani Arabs to move from the interior and settle along the coast by planting date palms in the coastal Al Batinah Region. The town in the interior of Oman, Al Hamra, has its irrigation system improved by the new built large falaj, it seems that the Ya'ruba dynasty supported major investment in settlement and agricultural works such as terracing along the Wadi Bani Awf. Saif bin Sultan built new schools. He made the castle of Rustaq his residence, adding the Burj al Riah wind tower.

Saif bin Sultan died on 4 October 1711. He was buried in the castle of Rustaq in a luxurious tomb, later destroyed by a Wahhabi general. At his death he had great wealth, said to include 28 ships, 700 male slaves and one third of Oman's date trees. He was succeeded by his son. Sultan bin Saif II (r. 1711–1718) established his capital at Al-Hazm on the road from Rustaq to the coast. Now just a village, there still are remains of a great fortress that he built around 1710, and which contains his tomb.

=== Alliance with Great Britain ===
Sultan bin Ahmad assumed control of the government after the death of his nephew and strengthened the already powerful fleet by adding numerous gunships and sleek cargo vessels, he also needed a strong ally to help him regain control of Mombasa from the Mazrui clan, fight off the movement spreading from what is now Saudi Arabia and to keep the Qasimi tribes from the Persian city of Lengeh out of Oman. He found this able ally in Great Britain, which in the late 18th century was at war with France and knew that the French emperor, Napoleon Bonaparte, was planning to march through Persia and capture Muscat on his way to invade India. In 1798, Britain and Oman agreed on a Treaty of Commerce and Navigation.

Sultan bin Ahmad pledged himself to British interests in India, and his territories became out of bounds to the French. He allowed the British East India Company to establish the first trading station in the Persian Gulf, and a British consul was posted to Muscat. Zanzibar's position as an important trade centre was bolstered further when the supply of ivory from Mozambique to India collapsed because of excessive Portuguese export duties. The traders simply shipped their ivory through Zanzibar instead. Omani warships were in constant skirmishes up and down the gulf, which kept the Sultan preoccupied. It was in the course of one of his sorties during an incursion abroad a ship in the Persian Gulf in 1804 that Sayyid Sultan was shot in the head by a stray bullet. He was buried in Lengeh.

=== Relations with the United States of America ===
On 21 September 1833, a historic treaty of friendship and trade was signed with the United States. It was the second trade treaty formulated by the US and an Arab state (Morocco being the first in 1820). The United States and Oman both stood to benefit, as the US – unlike Britain and France – had no territorial ambitions in the Middle East and was solely interested in commerce. On 13 April 1840, the ship Al-Sultanah docked at New York, making it the first Arab envoy to ever visit the New World. Her crew of fifty-six Arab sailors caused a flurry of excitement among the three hundred thousand residents of that thriving metropolis. Al-Sultanah carried ivory, Persian rugs, spices, coffee and dates, as well as lavish gifts for President Martin Van Buren. The visit of Al-Sultanah lasted nearly four months, in which time the emissary, Ahmad bin Na'aman Al Kaabi, the first Arab emissary to visit the United States (whose portrait can still be seen in the Oman and Zanzibar display of the Peabody Essex Museum in Massachusetts) and his officers were entertained by state and city dignitaries. They received resolutions passed by official bodies, were given tours of New York City and saw sections which would, a few decades later, become Arabic-speaking immigrant neighborhoods. Among Bin Na'aman's hosts was Commodore Cornelius Vanderbilt, in whose home he met Governor William H. Seward and Vice President Richard Mentor Johnson. The visit of Al Kaabi to America was a happy one, and when he prepared to leave, the United States completely repaired Al-Sultanah and presented him with gifts for his Sultan.

=== Said bin Sultan of the al-Busaid Dynasty ===
Said bin Sultan was the son of Sultan bin Ahmad, who ruled Oman from 1792 to 1804. Sultan bin Ahmad died in 1804 on an expedition to Basra. He appointed Mohammed bin Nasir bin Mohammed al-Jabry as the Regent and guardian of his two sons, Salim bin Sultan and Said bin Sultan. Sultan's brother Qais bin Ahmad, ruler of Sohar, decided to attempt to seize power. Early in 1805 Qais and his brother Mohammed marched south along the coast to Muttrah, which he easily captured. Qais then started to besiege Muscat. Mohammed bin Nasir tried to bribe Qais to leave, but did not succeed.

Mohammed bin Nasir called on Badr bin Saif for help. After a series of engagements, Qais was forced to retire to Sohar. Badr bin Saif became the effective ruler. Allied with the Wahhabis, Badr bin Saif became increasingly unpopular. To get his wards out of the way, Badr bin Saif made Salim bin Sultan governor of Al Maşna‘ah, on the Batinah coast and Said bin Sultan governor of Barka.

In 1806, Said bin Sultan lured Badr bin Saif to Barka and murdered him nearby. Said was proclaimed ruler of Oman. There are different accounts of what happened, but it seems clear that Said struck the first blow and his supporters finished the job. Said was acclaimed by the people as a liberator from the Wahhabis, who left the country. Qais bin Ahmad at once gave his support to Said. Nervous of the Wahhabi reaction, Said blamed Mohammed bin Nasir for the murder.

==== Nominal claim to Banadir ====
In the 1820s, there was an air of mutual suspicion between the Omani rulers and Mogadishu. An incident involving a shipwrecked Omani vessel resulted in its entire crew being captured and sold to slavery in the city before being ransomed to Zanzibar after a year. Another incident occurred in 1823 when two community leaders boarding an Omani ship anchored in Mogadishu were kidnapped before being released at the request of British officer W.F.W Owen. The next year Britain failed to ratify Owen's Protectorate, leaving the rebellious towns of East Africa alone against the Omani forces. Mogadishu, unlike Mombasa refused British protection. Thus Mogadishu was bombarded by Omani forces in 1828 in a bid to restore Omani calims. In 1832, Said bin Sultan transferred the capital from Oman to Zanzibar and jurisdiction claims over the Banadir coast was allotted to the Sultan of Zanzibar because of instability in Muscat. At that time, the empire's African dominion extended along the Swahili coast to 12 miles south of the Ruvuma River in Mozambique. Although the empire's primary governance was concentrated along the coastline, it also established control over numerous African tributary states and designated governors for inland regions.

Although the Zanzibaris sought to control the Banadir region, similar to their Omani forebears, they had neither the resources or capability of asserting direct control. According to John Kirk, the Zanzibari claim to Mogadishu was the "veriest sham imaginable" and that on the Banadir the sultan "has neither influence nor power". Their rule was largely ceremonial and they were forced to pay a tribute to the Geledi Sultans who were the true rulers of the region, as well as to the Abgaal sultan. When sultan Barghash ibn Sa'id sought to build the Fort of Garessa in Mogadishu in the year 1870, it had to be with the agreement and assistance of the Sultan Ahmed Yusuf of the Geledi. According to Revoil, the garrison could not leave without fear of being assassinated by the Somalis. In Warsheikh, there was no Zanzibari presence and their rule was not recognized by either the chief or the people. The residents of Merca and Barawa were still dependent on neighboring Somali chiefs in the interior rather than the Zanzibar sultan. Bargash's power was so limited that he was incapable of ensuring that the nationals of European powers could trade or travel in the region. In Barawa, an Englishman named Arthur Heale was murdered by two Somalis and the governor was unable to do anything about it. There existed a delicate balance of control and friendship, although the Zanzibari sultan's power was "vague and uncertain" when contrasted with the dominance of the Geledi.

Further along south, their influence was more cooperated such that when Darod reinforcements from the north arrived by sea to expand further south to Kismayo against the Gallas, they did so with the assistance of the Sultan of Zanzibar. The Darod established their controll there and opened and maintained direct commercial relations with Zanzibar. The Sultan of Zanzibar constructed a fort in Kismayo in 1869 following their approval to assist the trade against Oromo attacks.

The Sultan of Zanzibar later leased and then sold the infrastructure that he had built to the Italians, although not the land which is wrongfully stated by some accounts. The fort served as a residence (called Garesa) for the then Zanzibari representative to Mogadishu (nominal titled Governor by Zanzibar), Suleiman bin Hamed. Eventually it was turned into The National Museum of Somalia.

=== Decline ===
Under the 1798 Anglo-Omani Treaty of Friendship, Britain guaranteed the sultan's rule. When a succession crisis occurred in 1856, the Omani Empire was divided between the Sultanate of Oman and Muscat and the Sultanate of Zanzibar. Later in 1891, the former became a British Protectorate where the sultan controlled the Muscat coast while the Imam governed the interior from Nizwa.

== Sources ==
- Alston, Robert; Laing, Stuart (2012). Unshook Till the End of Time: A history of relations between Britain and Oman. Gilgamesh. ISBN 978-1-908531-07-0.
- Beck, Sanderson (2004). "East Africa, Portuguese, and Arabs". Middle East & Africa to 1875.
- Davies, Charles E. (1 January 1997). The Blood-red Arab Flag: An Investigation Into Qasimi Piracy, 1797–1820. University of Exeter Press. ISBN 978-0-85989-509-5.
- Eilts, Hermann Frederick (October 1962). "Ahmad bin Na'aman's mission to The United States in 1840: the voyage of Al-Sultanah to New York City". Essex Institute Historical Collections. Vol. 98, no. 4. Massachusetts. pp. 219–257. Cited in: J.E. Peterson (8 November 2014). "America and Oman: The Context for Two Nearly Centuries of Relations" (PDF). Archived from the original (PDF) on 2021-10-12.
- JPM Guides (1 March 2000). Gulf States. Hunter Publishing, Inc. ISBN 978-2-88452-099-7.
- Limbert, Mandana (7 June 2010). In the Time of Oil: Piety, Memory, and Social Life in an Omani Town. Stanford University Press. ISBN 978-0-8047-7460-4.
- Miles, Samuel Barrett (1997) [1st pub. 1919]. The Countries and Tribes of the Persian Gulf. Garnet & Ithaca Press. ISBN 978-1-873938-56-0.
- Ochs, Peter J. (1 November 1999). Maverick Guide to Oman. Pelican Publishing. ISBN 978-1-4556-0865-2.
- Plekhanov, Sergey (2004). A Reformer on the Throne: Sultan Qaboos Bin Said Al Said. Trident Press Ltd. p. 49. ISBN 978-1-900724-70-8.
- Rippin, Andrew (2013). The Islamic World. Taylor & Francis. ISBN 9781136803437.
- Siebert, Stefan (2005). Analysis of Arid Agricultural Systems Using Quantitative Image Analysis, Modeling and Geographical Information Systems. kassel university press GmbH. ISBN 978-3-89958-192-8.
- Thomas, Gavin (2011). The Rough Guide to Oman. Penguin. ISBN 978-1-4053-8935-8.
