= Omani Civil War (1718–1744) =

Succession war in Oman from 1718 to 1744

Omani Civil War الحرب الأهلية العُمانية
- Map of Oman during the civil war
Date	1718 – 20 November 1744
Location	Omani Empire
Result	Al Bu Sa'id victory
Territorial changes	Collapse of the Ya'rubid Dynasty; Expulsion of Persian forces from Oman; Establishment of the Al Bu Said dynasty

Belligerents
Loyalists; Ghafiris (1718 – 1722); Hinawis (after 1728) (Note: The Hinawis supported Khalaf bin Mubarak during 1724–1728 before later aligning with Saif bin Sultan II.)	Opposition; Hinawis (1718 – 1722); Ghafiris (after 1722)	Afsharid Iran (from 1737)

Commanders and leaders
Saif bin Sultan II †; Bel'arab bin Nasir † (surrendered) (Note: Supported by the Hinawis.); Ya'arab bin Bel'arab # (until 1722); Muhammad bin Nasir † (until 1722); Ahmad bin Said Al Busaidi	Muhanna bin Sultan (executed); Ya'arab bin Bel'arab # (from 1722); Muhammad bin Nasir † (from 1722); Sultan bin Murshid (DOW); Bal'arab bin Himyar	Nader Shah; Taqi Khan; Mir Ali Khan †; Latif Khan; Kelb Ali Khan

The Omani Civil War (1718–1744) (Note: Arabic: الحرب الأهلية العمانية (1718–1744), romanized: al-Ḥarb al-Ahliyyah al-ʿOmāniyyah) was a prolonged war of succession in the Omani Empire during the final years of the Ya'arubid dynasty following the death of Imam Sultan bin Saif II in 1718. It culminated in the collapse of the Ya'arubid dynasty and the establishment of the Al Busaid dynasty under Ahmad bin Said in 1744, which rules Oman to this day.

Triggered by disputes over the succession to the Imamate following the death of Imam Sultan bin Saif II in 1718, the conflict evolved into a prolonged struggle between rival claimants to the imamate and their tribal supporters. The war devastated much of Oman, led to repeated Persian interventions, and led to the formation of two main tribal alliances; the Hinawi and Ghafiri.

== Background ==
During the seventeenth century, the Ya'aruba dynasty transformed Oman into an empire after expelling the Portuguese from Muscat in 1650. The dynasty spread Omani influence across the Persian Gulf and East Africa, establishing control over ports and maritime trade. By the early eighteenth century, however, rivalries within the ruling family weakened political stability.

=== Succession crisis ===
After the death of Imam Sultan bin Saif II in 1718, an assembly of sheikhs and other notable people was convened at Rustaq, where the Qadhi Adey bin Suliman was persuaded to proclaim twelve-year old Saif bin Sultan II the Imam, albeit reluctantly. Although Saif was popular among the people, the ulama considered he was too young to hold office and favored his great-uncle, Muhanna bin Sultan as Imam.

== Course of the war ==
In 1719, supporters of Muhanna bin Sultan smuggled him into Rustaq Fort by stealth and proclaimed him Imam, with the young Saif fleeing to Al-Hazm Castle. He was unpopular, and in 1720, was deposed and killed by his cousin, Ya'arub bin Bal'arab, to set up Saif as Imam and to proclaim himself Custodian. In May 1722, Ya'arub took the next step and proclaimed himself Imam. This caused an uprising led by Bel'arab bin Nasir, the brother-in-law of Ya'arub.

=== Bel'arab's revolt against Ya'arub (1722–1723) ===
In August, Bel'arab marched from Nizwa to Rustaq, where his forces set fire to the fort and expelled the wali of the town, who was an adherent of Imam Ya'arab. On hearing that Bel'arab had commenced hostilities against him, Ya'arab despatched a force of 400 men to recover Rustaq, but the force was unable to proceed further than Al Awabi and was obliged to retreat.

Bel'arab sent a letter to the Wali of Muscat, Himyar bin Munir al-Ryamee, ordering him to surrender the city. The Wali of Nakhl soon followed suit by surrendering his post. Bel'arab detached a force from Rustaq under the command of Malik bin Saif al-Ya'arubi, who captured Samail and, with the assistance of the Bani Ruwaihah, occupied Izki without opposition. The inhabitants of Izki, who supported Imam Ya'arab, encouraged him to retake the town. Ya'arab subsequently marched against Izki with two guns and laid siege to Malik bin Saif's force. During the siege, however, Ya'arab was attacked by a force of the Bani Hina under Ali bin Mohammed, the Sahib al-Anbar, which had arrived from Rustaq. Ya'arab's army was decisively defeated and forced to retreat to Nizwa.

Following Ya'arab's defeat at Izki, Bel'arab ordered the execution of the qadis Adey bin Suliman and Suliman bin Khalfan at Rustaq. Ali then advanced on Nizwa, where he besieged Ya'arab and forced him to abdicate the imamate. Under the terms of the surrender, Ya'arab was permitted to retire peacefully to Yabrin in Wadi Bahla. Saif bin Sultan was subsequently elected Imam for the third time at Nizwa and Rustaq, while Bel'arab was proclaimed regent.

=== Reign of Muhammad bin Nasir (1724–1728) ===
Shortly after Bel'arab's appointment as regent, Muhammad bin Nasir al-Ghafiri, the tamimah (leader) of the Bani Ghafir tribe, travelled to Rustaq to congratulate the new government. Relations between the two men soon deteriorated, however, and Bel'arab quarrelled with Muhammad. In response, Muhammad organized a rebellion in alliance with the former Imam Ya'arab, reigniting the war.

Bel'arab's attempts to regain the initiative ended in a series of defeats, while Muhammad gradually secured control through successful campaigns in the interior and victories at Fark and Rustaq, where Ali bin Mohammed was killed. Bel'arab subsequently agreed to surrender Rustaq and the remaining forts, although tensions persisted after he failed to fulfill all the terms of the agreement. Following Ya'arab's death in March 1723, Muhammad imprisoned Bel'arab, received reinforcements from northern tribes, and prepared for a renewed campaign against Khalf bin Mubarak al-Hinawi, who had emerged as leader of the Hinawis and retained control of Muscat and Barka.

Despite setbacks, including a failed siege of Barka, Muhammad bin Nasir gradually secured dominance through a series of successful campaigns across Oman, repeatedly defeating the Hinawi forces under Khalf bin Mubarak and bringing much of the interior under his control. By late 1724, his military victories had established him as the dominant leader in the civil war.

Muhammad bin Nasir convened an assembly of Omani tribal leaders and religious officials at Nizwa. There, he publicly offered widthdraw from the struggle, but the assembled notables urged him, as planned, to accept the Imamate instead. Following his acceptance, Muhammad bin Nasir was elected Imam on 2 October 1724.

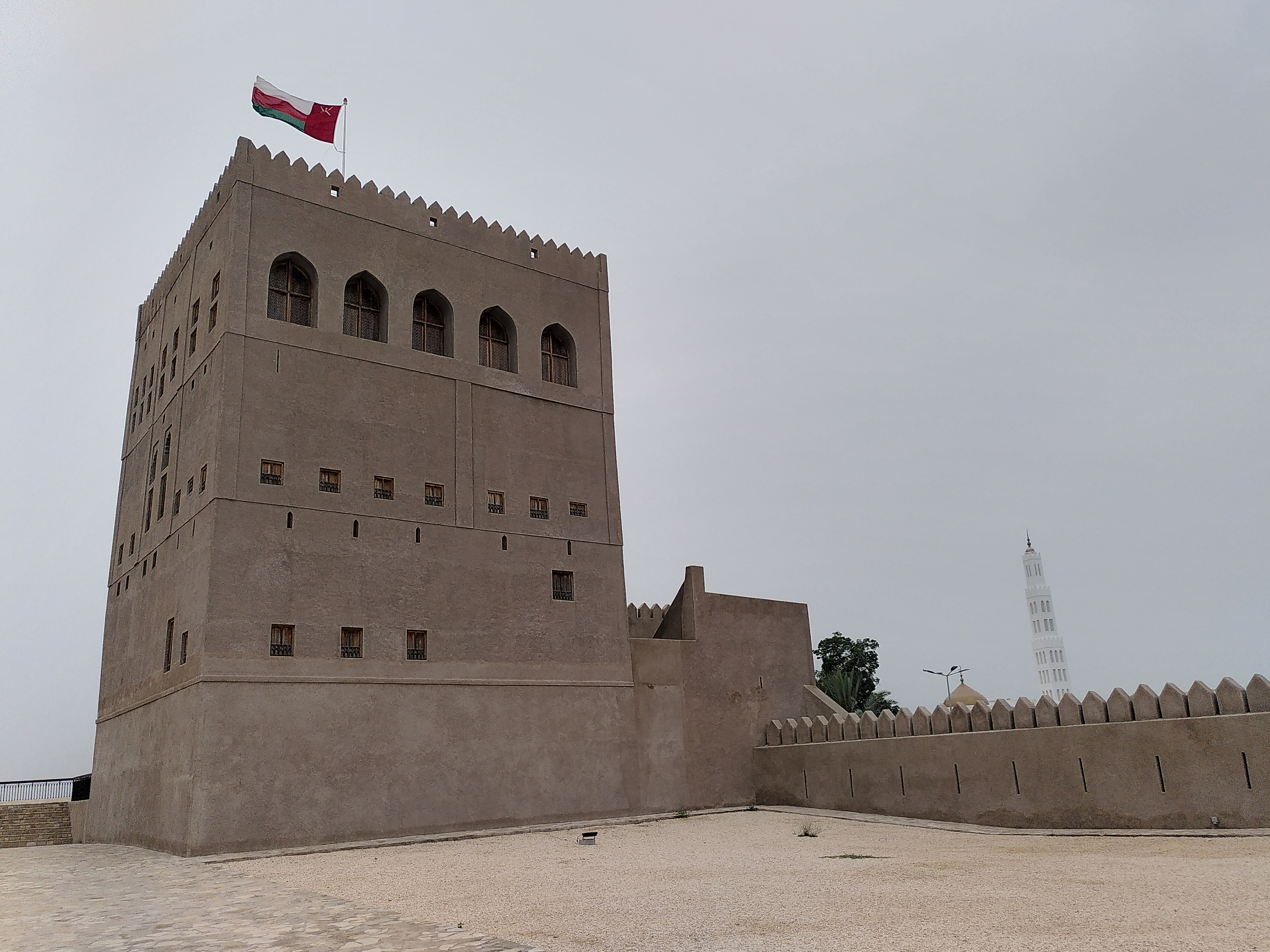
Sohar Fort

After his election as Imam, Muhammad spent much of his reign suppressing the forces of Khalf bin Mubarak, consolidating his authority over much of the Omani interior while retaining Saif bin Sultan under his supervision to prevent him from becoming the focus of opposition. In late 1727, Muhammad launched a major campaign against the remaining Hinawi strongholds on the coast, laying siege to Sohar. Although the town submitted, the fort continued to resist, and Khalf marched from Muscat to relieve the garrison. In the ensuing battle in March 1728, both Khalf bin Mubarak and Muhammad bin Nasir were killed, bringing an end to Muhammad's rule.

=== Rival Imams (1728–1736) ===
Following the death of Muhammad bin Nasir, Saif bin Sultan II entered Sohar and was welcomed at Rustaq before proceeding to Nizwa. There, on 2 April 1728, an assembly of tribal leaders and religious officials proclaimed him Imam for the fourth time, restoring him to power after attaining his majority.

However, some of the inhabitants of Az Zahirah elected Saif's cousin Bal'arab bin Himyar as Imam, dividing Oman between two competing governments. Bel'arab gradually extended his authority over much of the interior, while Saif retained control of Muscat and the principal coastal towns, resulting in a prolonged political stalemate and continued instability. In 1736, Saif attempted to break the deadlock by employing Baloch mercenaries, but his forces were decisively defeated by Bel'arab at Al Jaw, further weakening his position.

=== Persian intervention and invasions (1737–1744) ===
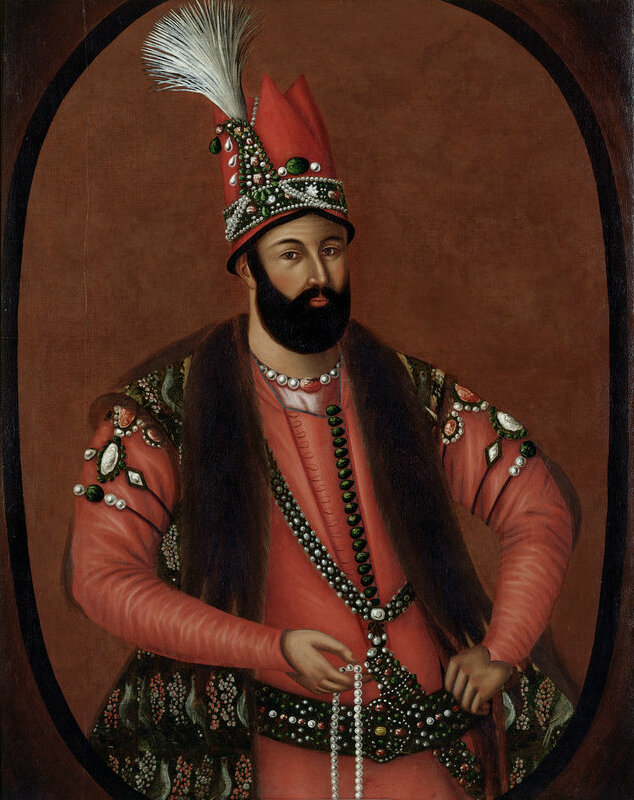
Nader Shah

==== First intervention ====
As Saif bin Sultan II's power dwindled, he appealed to Nader Shah for military assistance, leading to the first Persian intervention in Oman in 1737.

The combined Omani–Persian force defeated Bel'arab bin Himyar, but the Persian army's widespread looting and atrocities alienated Saif, who soon broke with his allies after their campaign. For a few years after this Saif bin Sultan II was undisputed ruler, but he led a self-indulgent life, which turned the tribes against him. Although Bel'arab abandoned his claim to the Imamate, Saif failed to restore stable rule, and in 1742 a group of tribal leaders and religious officials deposed him in favor of Sultan bin Murshid. After Sultan bin Murshid failed to capture Muscat, he occupied nearby Muttrah, diverting trade from the city and weakening Saif bin Sultan II financially.

==== Second intervention and rise of Ahmad bin Said Al Busaidi ====
Desperate to regain power, Saif again appealed to Nader, who dispatched a Persian expedition of about 6,000 men under Taqi Khan that landed at Julfar in late 1742. Saif agreed to recognize Persian suzerainty and reportedly promised to cede Sohar in return for restoration to the Imamate, but many of his own commanders opposed the alliance and instead joined Sultan bin Murshid, marking the beginning of the second Persian intervention in Oman.

The Persian invasion initially met with strong Omani resistance, as assaults on Sohar and Muscat were repulsed by the defenders under Ahmad bin Sa'id and Sultan bin Murshid. After receiving reinforcements, however, the Persians captured Muttrah and, through deception, secured the surrender of the forts guarding Muscat. (Note: The story is that Saif and his companions became stupified with wine at a banquet attended by the Persians. The Persian leader stole his seal and forged orders to the commanders of the forts to give them up.) He died soon after.

Saif was forced to abandon the city while Sultan bin Murshid was killed during the fighting around Sohar, while Ahmad bin Sa'id continued to defend the city against the Persian siege, emerging as the leading figure of Omani resistance. After enduring nine months of siege in Sohar, Ahmad negotiated an honorable surrender and was confirmed as governor of Sohar and Barka in return for payment of tribute. In 1744 he was elected Imam, marking the end of the Omani Civil War.

In 1749 Ahmad gathered an army and moved against Bal'arab, who was encamped near Jebel Akhdar with inferior forces. In the final battle, in the second half of 1749, Bal'arab was defeated and killed. This was the end of Yaruba power

==== End of the persian occupation (1747) ====
In 1747, the Afsharid king of Persia, Nadir Shah was assassinated in Khurasan. Chaos fallowed his death. The Persian forces in Oman, as everywhere else in Persian Empire, faced the hierarchical and disciplinary vacuum, leading to massive desertion. Taking advantage of the situation, Ahmad invited the remaining Persian garrison to a banquet at his fort in Barka, where he orchestrated a massacre.

== Aftermath ==
=== Establishment of the Al Bu Said Dynasty ===
Ahmad bin Sa'id's victory over Bel'arab bin Himyar in 1749 secured his position as Imam. His accession marked the foundation of the Al Bu Sa'id dynasty, which restored political stability, reunited Oman, and has remained the country's ruling dynasty to the present day. While later historians often treat 1749 as the beginning of a new era, many of the political and administrative institutions established under the Ya'arubids continued under the Al Bu Sa'id rulers.

=== Legacy ===
The civil war marked the end of Oman's seventeenth-century imperial expansion and left the country politically fragmented for nearly three decades. At first some towns in the interior still adhered to Ya'ariba or other local leaders. On the coast of East Africa, Ahmad bin Said was recognized as Imam only by the governor of Zanzibar. Ahmad bin Said only became undisputed ruler of Oman when Bal'arab bin Himyar died in 1749. The Yaruba family retained some independence. It was not until 1869 that their last stronghold, the fort of al-Hayam in the Al Batinah Region, was taken by Azzan bin Qais.

== See also ==
- Jebel Akhdar War
- Dhofar Rebellion
