= List of rulers of Oman =

Sultan of Oman
- سلطان سلطنة عمان
- Royal Standard of Oman

Incumbent
- Haitham bin Tariq since 11 January 2020

Details
- Style: His Majesty
- Heir apparent: Theyazin bin Haitham
- First monarch: Al-Julanda ibn Mas'ud (imamate); Ahmad bin Said (as sultan)
- Formed: 749; 1277 years ago (imamate); 1744; 282 years ago (Al Bu Said dynasty)
- Residences: Al Alam Palace; Al Baraka Palace
- Website: hmhaitham.com

The sultan of the Sultanate of Oman (Arabic: سلطان سلطنة عمان, romanized: Sulṭān Salṭanat ʿUmān) is the monarchical head of state and head of government of Oman. It is the most powerful position in the country. The sultans of Oman are members of the Al Bu Said dynasty, which has been the ruling family of Oman since the mid-18th century. Haitham bin Tariq is the current sultan, reigning since 11 January 2020.

Prior to the establishment of the present-day Sultanate of Oman in 1970, the Sultanate of Muscat and Oman, the Omani Empire, and the Imamate of Oman all ruled the area since 749.

== List of imams ==
=== Initial Imams (749–1406) ===
Imams		Tribe	Residence	Began to reign	Reference
Transliteration of the Arab names	Names in Arab script	Tribe	Residence	Began to reign	Reference
Under Umayyad control until the Abbasid revolution in 749					
Al-Julanda ibn Mas'ud	الجلندى بن مسعود	Azd	Sohar	749	
Under Abbasid control (751–793)					
Muhammad ibn Abi Affan	محمد بن أبي عفان	Azd	Nizwa	793	
Al-Warith ibn Ka'b	الوارث بن كعب	Yahmad	Nizwa	801	
Ghassan ibn Abd Allah	غسان بن عبد الله	Yahmad	Nizwa	807	
Abd al-Malik ibn Humayd	عبد المالك بن حميد	Azd	?	824	
Al-Muhanna ibn Jayfar	المهنا بن جيفر	Yahmad	Nizwa	840	
Al-Salt ibn Malik	الصلت بن مالك	Azd	?	851	
Rashid ibn al-Nazar	راشد بن النظر	?	?	886	
Azzan ibn Tamim	عزان بن تميم	?	Nizwa	890	
Muhammad ibn al-Hasan	محمد بن الحسن	Azd	?	897	
Azzan ibn al-Hazbar	عزان بن الهزبر	Yahmad	?	898	
Abd Allah ibn Muhammad	عبد الله بن محمد	?	?	899	
Al-Salt ibn al-Qasim	الصلت بن القاسم	?	?	900	
Al-Husn ibn Sa'id	الحسن بن سعيد	?	?	900	
Al-Hawari ibn Matraf	الحواري بن مطرف	?	?	904	
Umar ibn Muhammad	عمر بن محمد	?	?	912	
Muhammad ibn Yazid	محمد بن يزيد	Kinda	?	?	
Al-Hakm ibn al-Mila al-Bahri	الحكم بن الملا البحري	Bahri	Nizwa	?	
Sa'id ibn Abd Allah	سعيد بن عبد الله	?	?	939	
Rashid ibn al-Walid	راشد بن الوليد	?	Nizwa	?	
Al-Khalil ibn Shadhan	الخليل بن شاذان	Kharusi	?	1002	
Rashid ibn Sa'id	راشد بن سعيد	Yahmad	?	1032	
Hafs ibn Rashid	حفص بن راشد	Yahmad	?	1068	
Rashid ibn Ali	راشد بن علي	Yahmad	?	1054	
Musa ibn Jabir	ابن جابر موسى	?	Nizwa	1154	
Malik ibn Ali	مالك بن علي	?	?	1406	

=== Nabhani dynasty (1406–1624) ===
Name	Reign start	Reign end	Notes
Muhammed al-Fallah	1406	1435	
Abul Hassan of Oman	1435	1451	
Omar bin al Khattab	1451	1490	
Omar al Sharif	1490	1500	
Muhammad bin Ismail	1500	1529	Portuguese protectorate imposed on 15 April 1515.
Barakat bin Muhammad	1529	1560	
Abdulla bin Muhammad	1560	1624	

=== Yarubid dynasty (1624–1749) ===
Name	Reign start	Reign end	Notes
Nasir bin Murshid	1624	1649	
Sultan bin Saif	1649	1679	Portuguese protectorate ended on 28 January 1650.
Bil'arab bin Sultan	1679	1692	
Saif bin Sultan	1692	1711	
Sultan bin Saif II	1711	1718	
Saif bin Sultan II	1718	1719	First reign
Muhanna bin Sultan	1719	1720	
Saif bin Sultan II	1720	1722	Second reign
Ya'arab bin Bel'arab	1722	1722	
Saif bin Sultan II	1722	1724	Third reign
Muhammad bin Nasir	1724	1728	Not a member of the dynasty
Saif bin Sultan II	1728	1742	Fourth reign; at first in the coastal area only
Bal'arab bin Himyar	1728	1737	First reign; in the interior
Sultan bin Murshid	1742	1743	
Bal'arab bin Himyar	1743	1749	Second reign; in the interior

== List of sultans (1749–present) ==
Name	Lifespan	Reign start	Reign end	Notes	Family	Image
Ahmad bin Said: أحمد بن سعيد	1694 – 15 December 1783 (aged 89)	10 June 1749	15 December 1783	From 1744 in the coastal region	Al Bu Said	
Said bin Ahmad: سعيد بن أحمد	1741 – 1811 (aged 70)	15 December 1783	1786	Son of Ahmad bin Said	Al Bu Said	
Hamad bin Said: حمد بن سعيد	? – 13 March 1792	1786	13 March 1792	Son of Said bin Ahmad	Al Bu Said	
Sultan bin Ahmad: سلطان بن أحمد	1755 – 17 November 1804 (aged 48–49)	18 March 1792	17 November 1804	Son of Ahmad bin Said	Al Bu Said	
Salim bin Sultan: سالم بن سلطان	11 September 1790 – 4 April 1821 (aged 30)	18 November 1804	14 September 1806	Son of Sultan bin Ahmad	Al Bu Said	
Said bin Sultan: سعيد بن سلطان	5 June 1791 – 19 October 1856 (aged 65)	20 November 1804	19 October 1856	Son of Sultan bin Ahmad	Al Bu Said	Said bin Sultan
Thuwaini bin Said: ثويني بن سعيد	1821 – 11 February 1866 (aged 45)	19 October 1856	11 February 1866	Son of Said bin Sultan	Al Bu Said	Thuwaini bin Said
Salim bin Thuwaini: سالم بن ثويني	1839 – 7 December 1876 (aged 37)	11 February 1866	3 October 1868 (deposed)	Son of Thuwaini bin Said	Al Bu Said	
Azzan bin Qais: عزان بن قيس	? – 30 January 1871	3 October 1868	30 January 1871	Great-great-grandson of Ahmad bin Said	Al Bu Said	Azzan bin Qais
Turki bin Said: تركي بن سعيد	1832 – 4 June 1888 (aged 56)	30 January 1871	4 June 1888	Son of Said bin Sultan	Al Bu Said	Turki bin Said
Faisal bin Turki: فيصل بن تركي	8 June 1864 – 5 October 1913 (aged 49)	4 June 1888	5 October 1913	Son of Turki bin Said	Al Bu Said	Faisal bin Turki
Taimur bin Faisal: تيمور بن فيصل	1886 – 28 January 1965 (aged 79)	5 October 1913	10 February 1932 (abdicated)	Son of Faisal bin Turki	Al Bu Said	Taimur bin Faisal
Said bin Taimur: سعيد بن تيمور	13 August 1910 – 19 October 1972 (aged 62)	10 February 1932	23 July 1970 (deposed)	Son of Taimur bin Faisal	Al Bu Said	Said bin Taimur
Qaboos bin Said: قابوس بن سعيد	18 November 1940 – 10 January 2020 (aged 79)	23 July 1970	10 January 2020	Son of Said bin Taimur	Al Bu Said	Qabus bin Said
Haitham bin Tariq: هيثم بن طارق	11 October 1955 (age 71)	11 January 2020	Incumbent	Grandson of Taimur bin Faisal	Al Bu Said	Haitham bin Tariq

== Succession ==
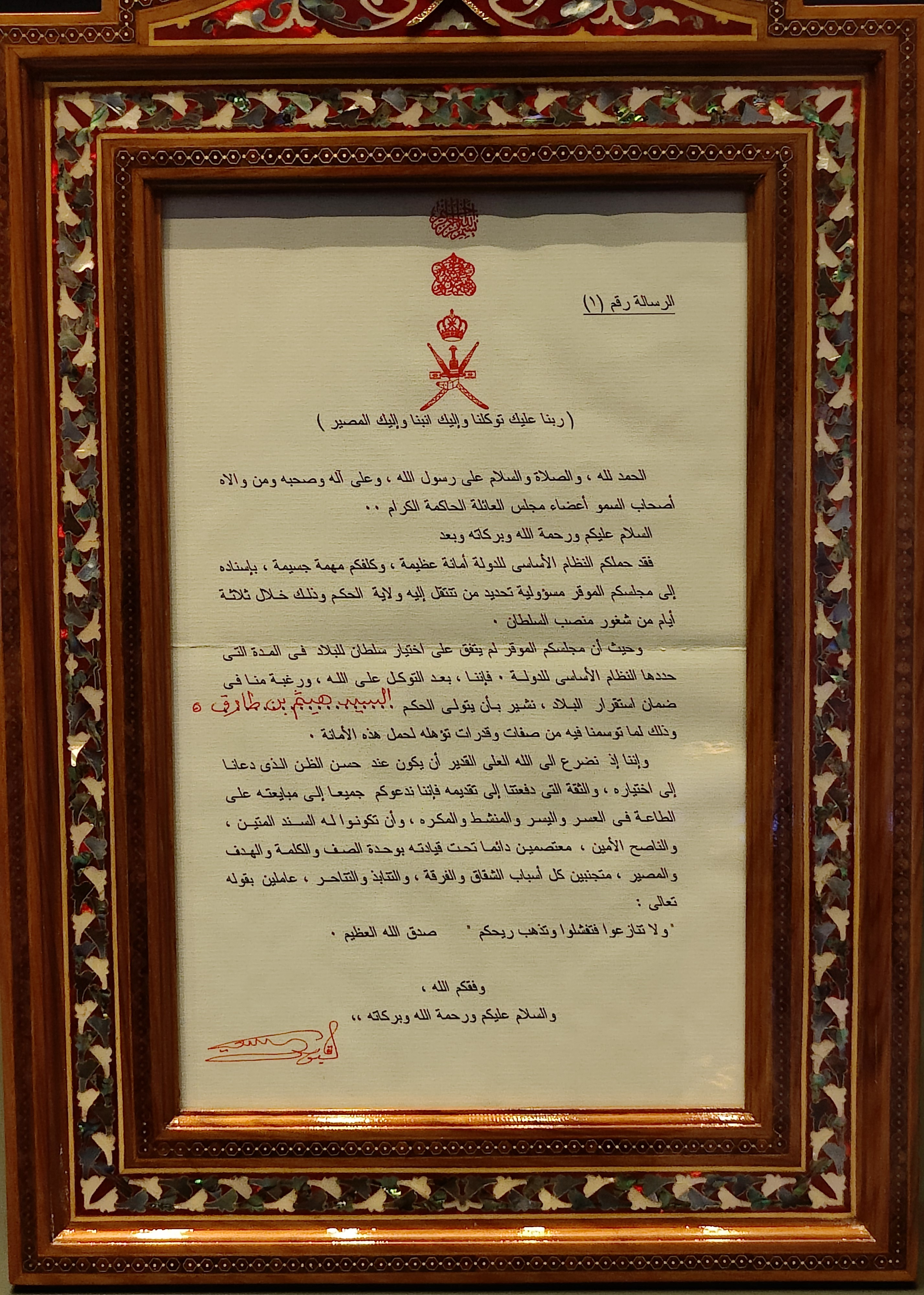
The will of Sultan Qaboos, in which he named his cousin Haitham bin Tariq his heir

Unlike the heads of other Arab states of the Persian Gulf, Qaboos did not publicly name an heir. Article 6 of the constitution says the Royal Family Council has three days to choose a new sultan from the date the position falls vacant. If the Royal Family Council fails to agree, a letter containing a name penned by Sultan Qaboos should be opened in the presence of the Defence Council of military and security officials, supreme court chiefs, and heads of the upper and lower houses of the consultative assemblies. Analysts saw the rules as an elaborate means of Qaboos securing his choice for successor without causing controversy by making it public during his lifetime, since it was considered unlikely that the royal family would be able to agree on a successor on its own.

Qaboos had no children, and only one sister, Sayyida Umaima (who predeceased him in 2002), but no male siblings; there are other male members of the Omani royal family including paternal uncles and their families. Using same-generation primogeniture, the successor to Qaboos would appear to be the children of his late uncle Sayyid Tariq bin Taimur, Oman's first prime minister and the Sultan's former father-in-law. Oman watchers believed the top contenders to succeed Qaboos were three of Tariq's sons: Asa'ad bin Tariq, Deputy Prime Minister for International Relations and Cooperation and the Sultan's special representative; Shihab bin Tariq, a retired commander of the Royal Navy of Oman; and Haitham bin Tariq, Minister of Heritage and National Culture.

On 11 January 2020, Oman state TV said the Royal Family Council, in a letter to the Defense Council, had decided to defer to the choice that Qaboos named in his will, and thus had opened the letter by Qaboos naming his successor, announcing shortly that Haitham bin Tariq is the country's ruling sultan. Haitham has two sons and two daughters.

On 12 January 2021, the current Sultan, Haitham bin Tariq officially changed the Basic Law of the State, stipulating the creation of the post for the Crown Prince of Oman and appointed his first son, Theyazin bin Haitham as the apparent successor, making him the first Crown Prince of the Sultanate.

== See also ==
- History of Oman
- Sultanate of Zanzibar
  - List of sultans of Zanzibar

== Bibliography ==
- Razik, Salil-Ibn (2004) [First published 1871]. الشعاع الشائع باللمعان في ذكر أئمة عمان [History of the Imams and Seyyids of Oman]. trans. Reverend George Percy Badger. Kessinger Publishing. ISBN 978-1-4179-4787-4.
