= List of ambassadors of Oman to China =

Coordinates: 39.946378°N 116.458409°E

Ambassador of Oman to China
- Incumbent; Nasser bin Mohammed bin Khalifa al-Busaidi since April 14, 2021
- Inaugural holder: Ibrahim Hamood al-Subhi
- Formation: 1979

The Omani ambassador in Beijing is the official representative of the Government in Muscat, Oman to the Government of the People's Republic of China.

== List of representatives ==
Diplomatic agrément/Diplomatic accreditation	Ambassador	Observations	List of rulers of Oman	Premier of the People's Republic of China	Term end
May 25, 1978		The governments in Beijing and Muscat, Oman established diplomatic relations	Qaboos bin Said al Said	Hua Guofeng	
1979	Ibrahim Hamood al-Subhi		Qaboos bin Said al Said	Hua Guofeng	1981
1982	Awad Badar al-Shanfari		Qaboos bin Said al Said	Zhao Ziyang	1984
1984	Farid bin Mararak al- Hanaei		Qaboos bin Said al Said	Zhao Ziyang	
November 3, 1987	Mushtaq Bin Abdullah Bin Jaffer Al-Saleh		Qaboos bin Said al Said	Li Peng	
December 18, 1994	Abulah Bin Mohammed Bin Abdullah Al-Farisy		Qaboos bin Said al Said	Li Peng	
October 31, 2000	Abdullah Hosny		Qaboos bin Said al Said	Zhu Rongji	2005
March 21, 2007	Abdullah Saleh Al Saadi		Qaboos bin Said al Said	Wen Jiabao	
