= Al Hazm Castle =

Castle in Rustaq, Oman

- حصن الحزم
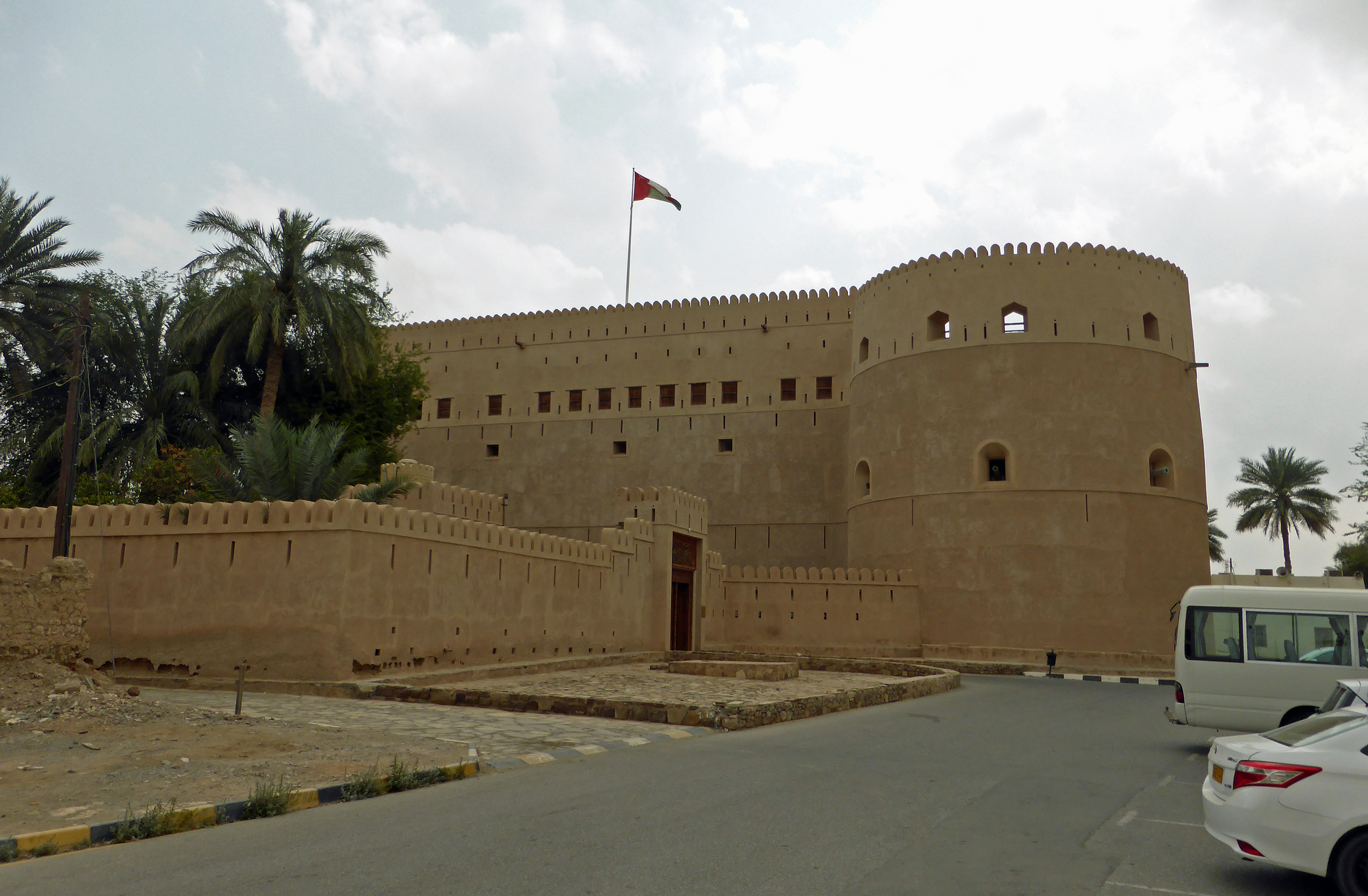

General information
- Location: Rustaq, Oman
- Coordinates: 23.5507°N 57.4729°E
- Construction started: 1708

Height
- Height: 40 meters

Al Hazm Castle, also known as Al Hazm fort, is a castle in Rustaq, Oman.

== History ==
The castle was built by Imam Sultan bin Saif II in 1708. It was built as a residence for the imam. The castle also had a prison, mosque, and religious classrooms.

After Sultan bin Saif II died in 1718, he was buried within the castle.

In 1988, it was submitted to the tentative list of the UNESCO World Heritage sites. It was undergoing restoration work as of 2020.

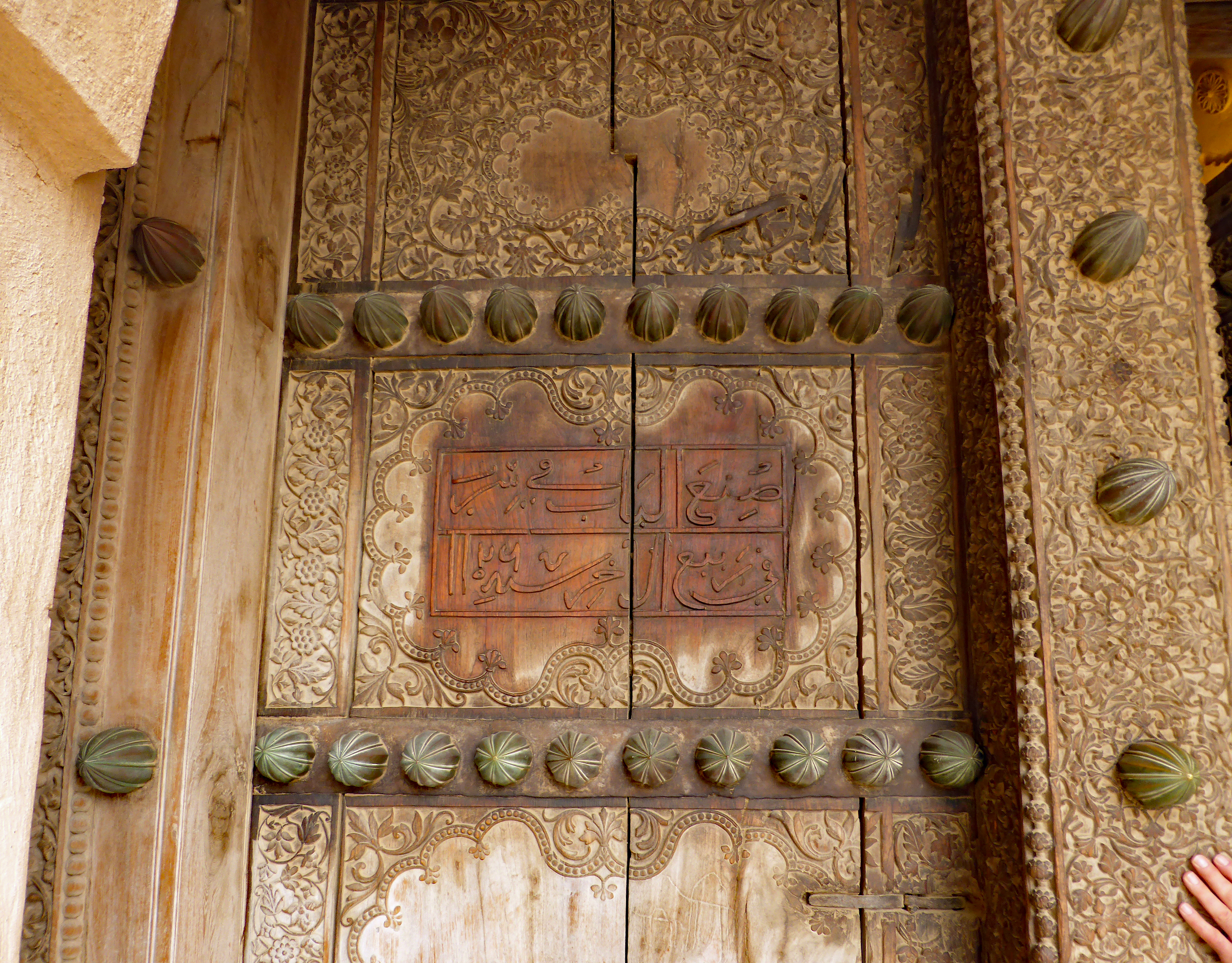
The castle gate

== Architecture ==
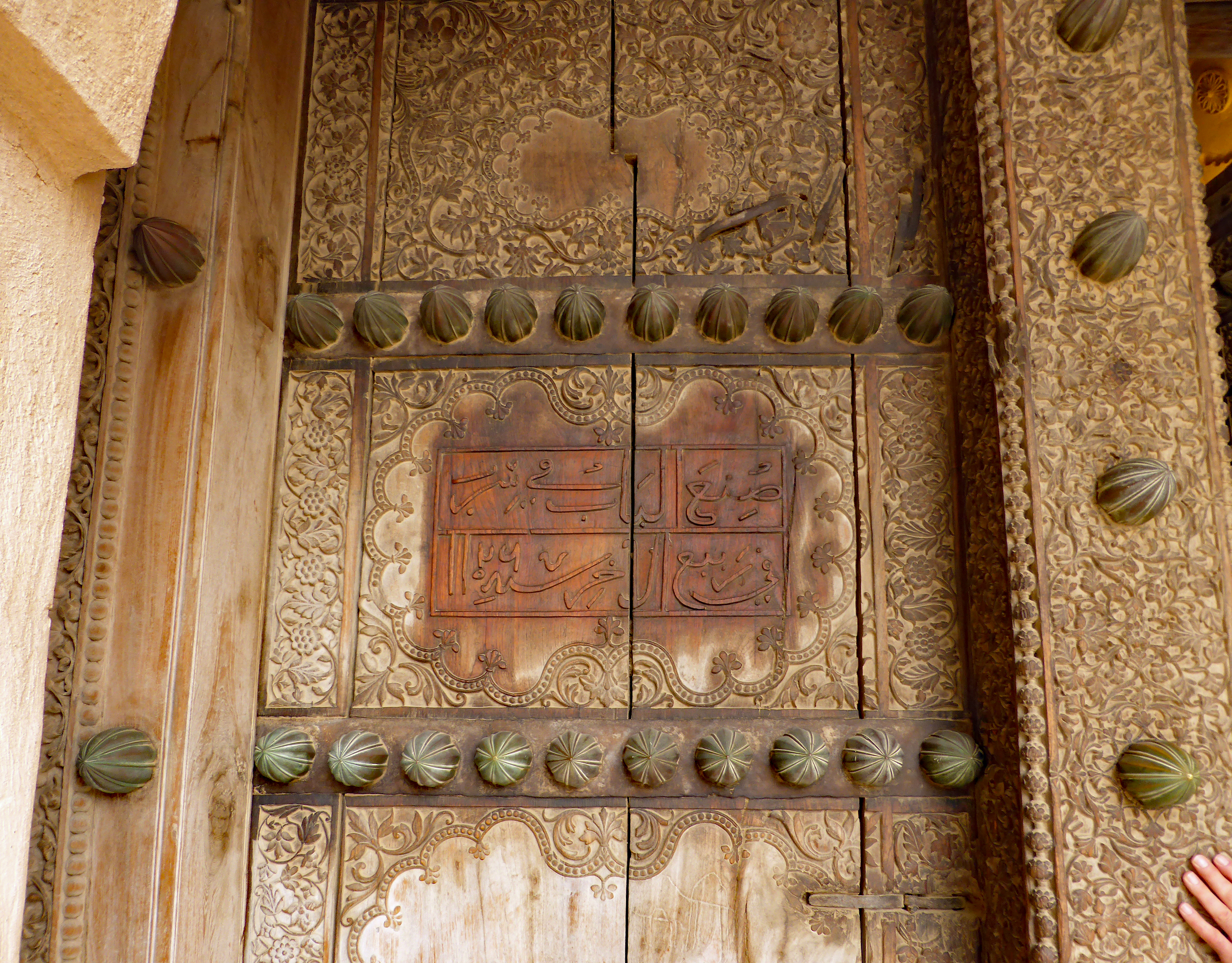
The wooden door

The castle is a large rectangular construction flanked by two round fortified towers. The towers are on the southern and eastern corners. The castle features a large, intricately carved wooden door.
