= Azzan ibn Tamim =

Imam and Sultan of Oman from 890 to 893

Azzan ibn Tamim عزان بن تميم
- Imam and Sultan

Imam and Sultan of Oman
- Reign: 890 – 893 CE
- Predecessor: Rashid ibn al-Nazar
- Successor: Muhammad ibn al-Hasan
- Died: 893 CE; Imamate of Oman
- Religion: Ibadi Islam

Azzan ibn Tamim al-Kharudi (Arabic: عزان بن تميم الخروضي, romanized: ʿAzzān ibn Tamīm al-Kharūḍī; died 893 CE) was the ruler of Oman from 890 to 893 CE, serving as both the nation's imam and sultan.

== Reign ==
Ibn Tamim was anointed Imam & Sultan of Oman in 890 CE—a time of tremendous turmoil for the region. Just three years later, Muhammad ibn Nur, a military commander of the Abbasid Caliphate, had invaded Oman, killing ibn Tamim along with his followers.
