= Muhammad bin Nasir =

Muhammad bin Nasir al-Ghafiri
- Imam

Imam of Oman (interior)
- Reign: 1724-1728
- Predecessor: Saif bin Sultan II
- Successor: Saif bin Sultan II (coast); Bal'arab bin Himyar (interior)
- Died: March 1728
- Father: Nasir bin Ahmad bin Ramthah al-Ghafiri

Muhammad bin Nasir al-Ghafiri (Arabic: محمد بن ناصر الغافري) (died 1728) was one of the rival Imams during the Omani Civil War in the final years of the Yaruba dynasty.

== Rule of Ya'arab bin Bel'arab ==
Mohammed bin Nasir was the "Temeemeh" of the Beni Ghafir, a Nizar tribe.

In 1720 Ya'Arab bin Bel'arab seized power in Oman, declaring himself regent during the minority of his cousin Saif bin Sultan II. In May 1722 Ya'Arab took the next step and proclaimed himself Imam. This caused an uprising led by Bel'arab bin Nasir, a relative by marriage of the deposed Imam. After some skirmishes, Ya'Arab bin Bel'arab was defeated at Nizwa and the young Saif bin Sultan II was again declared Imam, this time with Bela'rab bin Nasir as regent. Mohammed bin Nasir was among the notables who came to Rustaq to congratulate him. For some reason, Bel'arab bin Nasir picked a quarrel with Mohammed bin Nasir, who took steps to organize a rebellion in alliance with the former Imam Ya'Arab bin Bel'arab.

== Civil war ==
In the fighting that followed Sheikh Mohammed bin Nasir proved to be a skilled commander. After a series of defeats, Bel'arab bin Nasir was forced to accept peace terms under which he would surrender all forts in Oman. Around this time Ya'Arab bin Bel'arab died on 16 March 1723 at Nizwa. Mohammed bin Nasir learned that the forts at Muscat and Barka were holding out under the leadership of Kalf bin Mubarak al-Hinawi. He imprisoned Bel'arab bin Nasir, and with a growing force of tribesmen advanced on Barka. Confused fighting followed, with Mohammed bin Nasir much stronger on land but Kalf having the advantage of sea power.

== Imam ==
Mohammed bin Nasir gained the upper hand. In September 1724 he called a meeting of Sheikhs of Oman at which he declared his intent to withdraw from the struggle. As planned, he was asked to instead accept the position of Imam. Muhammad bin Nasir was elected Imam on 2 October 1724. His rival, Khalf bin Mubarak, stirred up trouble among the northern tribes. In an engagement at Sohar in 1728 both Khalf bin Mubarak and Muhammad bin Nasir were killed. The garrison of Sohar recognized Saif bin Sultan II as Imam, and he was re-installed at Nizwa. However, some of the inhabitants of Az Zahirah elected Saif's cousin Bal'arab bin Himyar as Imam.
