= Sultan bin Murshid =

- Imam

Imam of Oman
- Reign: 1742-1743
- Predecessor: Saif bin Sultan II
- Successor: Bal'arab bin Himyar
- Died: 1743
- Dynasty: Yaruba
- Father: Murshid bin Jadi bin Mubarak al-Ya'rubi

Sultan bin Murshid (Arabic: سلطان بن مرشد) (died 1743) was one of the rival Imams during the civil wars in Oman in the final years of the Yaruba dynasty. He was elected Imam in 1742 in place of Saif bin Sultan II. His predecessor called on the Persians for assistance. In mid-1743 Sultan bin Murshid died while defending the town of Sohar against the Persian force.

== Accession ==
Sultan bin Murshid bin Jadi belonged to a distant branch of the ruling Yaruba dynasty, but is also said to have been the grandson of the great Imam of Oman, Saif bin Sultan. His cousin, the Imam Saif bin Sultan II, led a self-indulgent life that turned the tribes against him. In February 1742 Sultan bin Murshid was proclaimed Imam in his place. Sultan bin Murshid was installed at Nakhal. He gathered troops and marched on Rustaq. Saif bin Sultan II also raised troops and counter-marched, but was too late to prevent the fall of Rustaq. He retreated to the town of Muscat and took a defensive stance. Sultan bin Murshid followed him to Muscat but was unable to take the town. Instead he occupied the nearby port of Muttrah, attracting merchants to this port and thus depriving Saif bin Sultan II of revenue.

== Struggle with the Persians ==
Saif bin Sultan II appealed to the Persians for help and promised to cede Sohar to them in exchange. Fresh from a victorious campaign in India, the Persian ruler Nader Shah dispatched an expedition of 6,000 men under Mirza Mohammed Taki Khan, which arrived at Julfar around October 1742. Saif bin Sultan II went by sea to Khor Fakkan and then traveled overland to meet the Persians. The officers of the ships at Khor Fakkan went over to Sultan bin Murshid, taking their ships to him at Muttrah. The Persians besieged Sohar and sent forces to Muscat, but were unable to take either place. In January 1743 they received reinforcements. They sent another force to attempt to take Muscat. Sultan bin Murshid, who was still based at Muttrah, deliberately abandoned Muscat, and the Persians entered the town. While they were engaged in plunder, Sultan bin Murshid attacked with the combined garrisons of Muttrah and Muscat, destroyed the Persian force and captured several ships.

== Death ==
The Persians sent a fresh force by land, and succeeded in taking Muttrah. Sultan bin Murshid escaped to Sohar, where he was mortally wounded under the walls of the town in mid-1743. Some say that he killed himself. Bal'arab bin Himyar was elected Imam in his place. The Persians took Muscat and again attacked Sohar to the north. After enduring nine months of siege, the governor Ahmad bin Said al-Busaidi negotiated an honorable surrender. Later he would drive the Persians from the country and establish a new dynasty of rulers of Oman.
