= Ya'arab bin Bel'arab =

- Imam

Imam of Oman (interior)
- Reign: 1722
- Predecessor: Saif bin Sultan II
- Successor: Saif bin Sultan II
- Died: 16 March 1723
- Father: Bil'arab bin Sultan

Ya'arab bin Bel'arab (Arabic: يعرب بن بلعرب) (died 1723) was one of the rival Imams during the Omani Civil War in the final years of the Yaruba dynasty.

Ya'arab bin Bel'arab was the cousin of Saif bin Sultan II, the young son of Sultan bin Saif II. Saif bin Sultan II was aged twelve when his father, the Imam Sultan bin Saif II, died in 1718. Although he had been named as successor and was popular among the people, the ulama decided he was too young to hold office and favored his older brother Muhanna bin Sultan. In 1719 Muhanna bin Sultan was brought into Rustaq Fort by stealth and proclaimed Imam. Muhanna was unpopular, and in 1720 was deposed and killed by Ya'arub bin Bal'arab.

Ya'arab bin Bel'arab declared himself regent during the minority of his cousin. In May 1722 Ya'arab took the next step and proclaimed himself Imam. This caused an uprising led by Bel'arab bin Nasir, a relative by marriage of the deposed Imam. After some skirmishes, Ya'arab bin Bel'arab was defeated at Nizwa and the young Saif bin Sultan II was again declared Imam, this time with Bela'rab bin Nasir as regent.

Mohammed bin Nasir was among the notables who came to Rustaq to congratulate him. For some reason, Bel'arab bin Nasir picked a quarrel with Mohammed bin Nasir, who took steps to organize a rebellion in alliance with the former Imam Ya'arab bin Bel'arab. After a series of defeats, Bel'arab bin Nasir was forced to accept peace terms under which he would surrender all forts in Oman. Around this time Ya'arab bin Bel'arab died on 16 March 1723 at Nizwa.
