= Bal'arab bin Himyar =

- Imam

Imam of Oman (interior)
- Reign: 1728–1737
- Predecessor: Muhammad bin Nasir
- Successor: Saif bin Sultan II
- Reign: 1743–1749
- Predecessor: Sultan bin Murshid
- Successor: Ahmad bin Said al-Busaidi
- Died: 1749
- Dynasty: Yaruba
- Father: Himyar bin Sultan bin Saif

Bal'arab bin Himyar (Arabic: بلعرب بن حمير) (died 1749) was an Omani Imam, a member of Yaruba dynasty. He was elected Imam in 1728, holding power in the interior of Oman while his cousin, Saif bin Sultan II, held power on the coast. In 1737, he renounced his claim after being defeated by Saif's Persian allies. He was again elected Imam in 1743 during another Persian invasion, and again held power in the interior while Ahmad bin Said al-Busaidi was recognized as ruler by the coastal people. He died in battle against Ahmad bin Said in 1749, who shortly after became the undisputed ruler of the country.

== Struggle with Saif bin Sultan II ==
In 1724 the Imam Saif bin Sultan II was deposed by Muhammad bin Nasir, who was elected Imam on 2 October 1724. His rival, Khalf bin Mubarak, stirred up trouble among the northern tribes. In an engagement at Sohar in 1728 both Khalf bin Mubarak and Muhammad bin Nasir were killed. The garrison of Sohar recognized Saif bin Sultan II as Imam, and he was re-installed at Nizwa. However, some of the inhabitants of Az Zahirah elected Saif's cousin Bal'arab bin Himyar as Imam.

A prolonged struggle began in which Saif was unable to overcome Bal'arab bin Himyar. He sent his brother, Bal'arab bin Sultan, to assist the Beni Ruwaihah, whom Bal'arab bin Himyar was fighting. The outcome was a defeat for the Beni Ruwaihah, who now recognized Bal'arab bin Himyar. Bal'arab bin Himyar returned to Nizwa, and began operations to subdue the surrounding district. He took Belad Sait and then Bahila. After this, the rival Imams remained armed but avoided hostilities for a few years. Belarab had the support of the Ghafiri faction and controlled most of the interior, and gradually gained the ascendancy on land. However, although Saif was only supported by the Beni Hina and a few allied tribes, he had the navy and the main seaports of Muscat, Burka and Sohar. The stand-off had disastrous economic consequences.

Around 1736 Saif engaged a company of Balochis armed with muskets, and sent them under the leadership of his brother Bal'arab bin Sultan, but they were decisively defeated by Bal'arab bin Himyar. In desperation, Saif bin Sultan asked for help from Nader Shah of Persia. (Note: According to the historian Samuel Barrett Miles, it is uncertain whether the Persians came to Oman at Saif bin Sultan's invitation or of their own accord. It is certain that Saif bin Sultan joined forces with them when they arrived.) The Persians arrived in March 1737. Saif bin Sultan joined the Persians. They marched to Az Zahirah where they met and routed the forces of Bal'arab bin Himyar. Bal'arab bin Himyar hastened back to Nizwa and improved the defenses. The Persians continued their advance into the interior, capturing towns, killing, looting and taking slaves. Saif fell out with the Persians and made his way to Muscat. The Persians completed their campaign and reembarked for Persia, taking their loot with them.

== Struggle with the Persians ==
After his defeat in 1737, Bal'arab bin Himyar agreed to renounce his claim to be Imam. For a few years Saif bin Sultan was undisputed ruler, although the tribes did not give him wholehearted support. Saif bin Sultan led a self-indulgent life, which turned the tribes against him. In February 1742 another rival Imam from the Yaruba family was proclaimed, Sultan bin Murshid bin Jadi, a grandson of the great Imam Saif bin Sultan. Sultan bin Murshid was installed at Nakhal and began to hound Saif bin Sultan, who again appealed to the Persians for help and promised to cede Sohar to them. Fresh from a victorious campaign in India, Nader Shah dispatched an expedition of 6,000 men under Mirza Mohammed Taki Khan, which arrived at Julfar around October 1742. The Persians besieged Sohar and also sent forces to Muscat, but were unable to take either place.

In 1743 Saif was tricked into delivering the last forts in Muscat while drunk at a banquet, and died soon after. The Persians took Muscat and again attacked Sohar to the north. The Imam Sultan bin Murshid was mortally wounded under the walls of Sohar in mid-1743. Bal'arab bin Himyar was elected Imam in his place. However, he was jealous of the popular governor of Sohar, Ahmad bin Said al-Busaidi, and did not provide military support. After enduring nine months of siege in Sohar, Ahmad bin Said al-Busaidi negotiated an honorable surrender and was confirmed as governor of Sohar and Barka in return for payment of tribute. In 1744 he was elected Imam. The Persian forces dwindled through desertions. In 1747 Ahmad invited the remaining Persian garrison to a banquet at his fort in Barka, where he massacred them.

== Final struggle with Ahmad bin Said ==
After Ahmad bin Said al-Busaidi had driven the Persians from Oman the tribes of the Hinawi faction recognized him as Imam, as did some of the Ghafiri tribes. Bal'arab bin Himyar retained the support of some of the Ghafiri of Dhahireh and the Semail. Bal'arab bin Himyar raised a strong force and advanced on Muscat, but was unable to take that town. He then attempted to take Sohar. Ahmad went to support the defence, but was deserted by his troops at the Battle of Bitnah around the start of 1745 and forced to flee. For several years Bal'arab bin Himyar was recognized as the true Imam, fully controlling the interior, while Ahmed remained on the coast. In 1749 Ahmad gathered an army and moved against Bal'arab, who was encamped near Jebel Akhdar with inferior forces. In the final battle, in the second half of 1749, Bal'arab was defeated and killed. This was the end of Yaruba power. The war-weary tribes united under Ahmad bin Sa'id.
