= Ya'rubids =

Rulers of Oman between 1624 and 1742

Ya'rubids اليعاربة
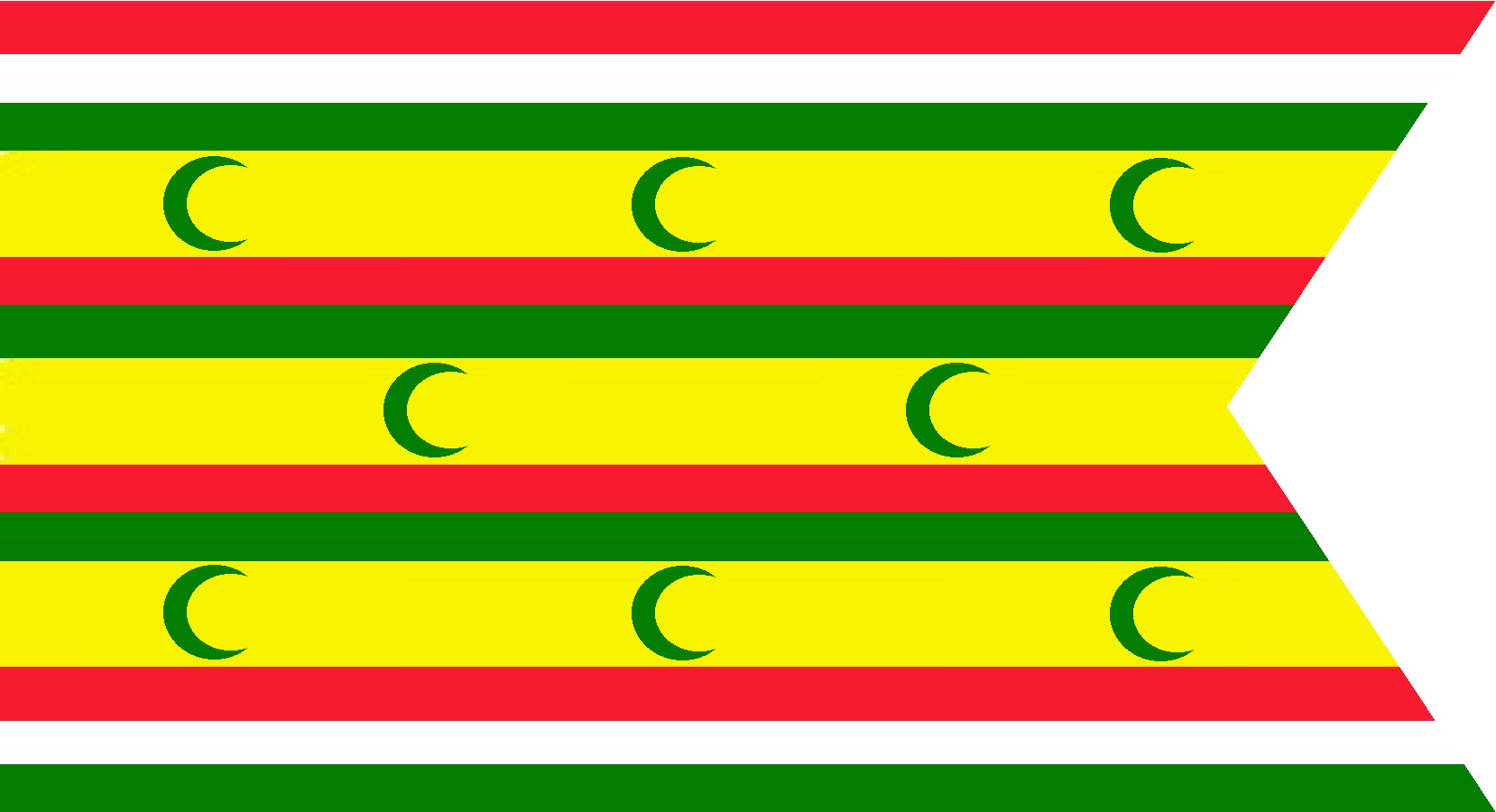
- Ensign of the Ya'rubids
- Country: Omani Empire
- Founded: 1624
- Founder: Nasir bin Murshid
- Current head: Extinct
- Final ruler: Bal'arab bin Himyar
- Titles: Imam of Oman
- Dissolution: 1742

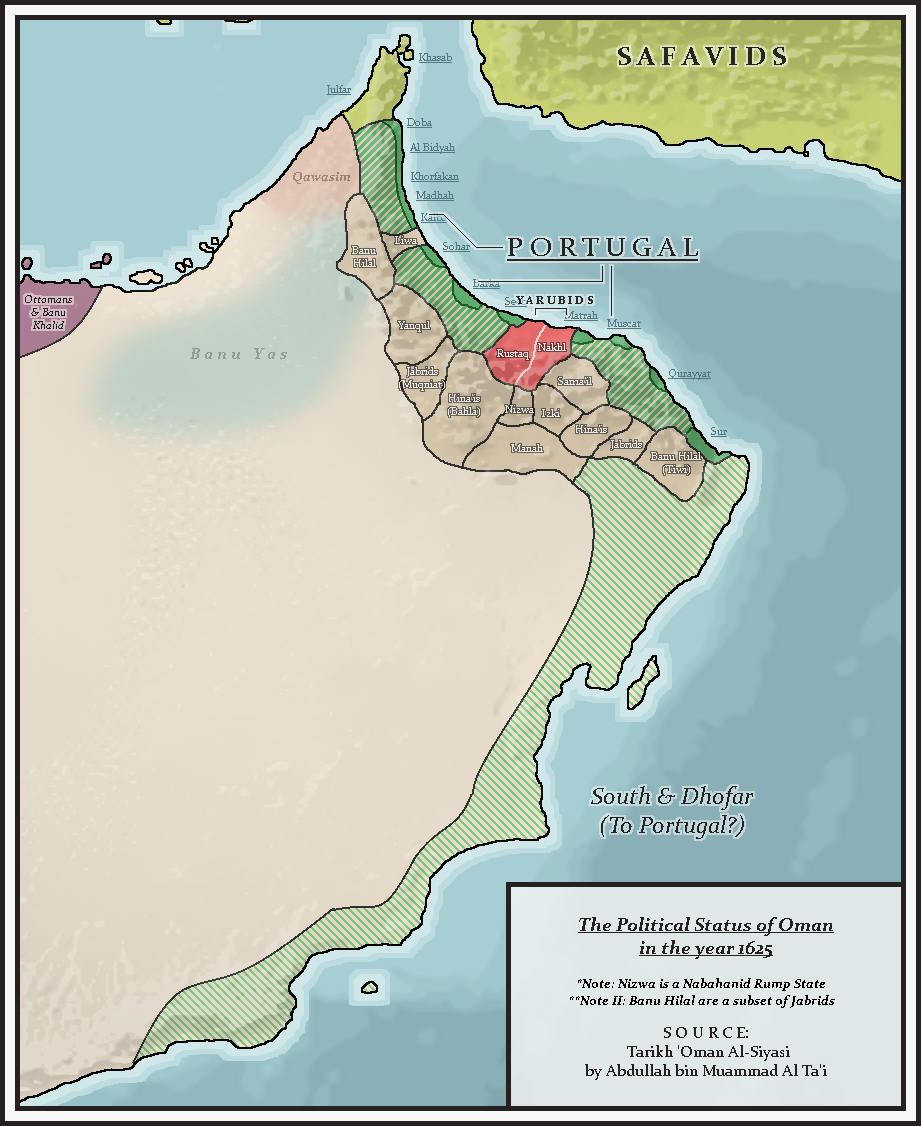
Yarubids at their founding in 1625

The Yarubid dynasty (also Ya'ariba or Ya'arubi; Arabic: أسرة آل يعرب) were rulers of Oman between 1624 and 1742, holding the title of Imam. They expelled the Portuguese from coastal strongholds in Muscat and united the country. They improved agriculture, expanded trade and built up Oman into a major maritime power. Their forces expelled the Portuguese from East Africa and established long-lasting settlements on Zanzibar, Mombasa and other parts of the coast. The dynasty lost power during a succession struggle that started in 1712 and fell after a prolonged period of civil war.

== Background ==
Oman has traditionally been divided between the relatively barren and sparsely populated interior and the more populous coastal region. There was often little or no overall government in the interior, and the tribes often fought amongst each other. They shared belief in the Ibadi branch of Islam, distinct from the main Sunni and Shia schools. The coastal region, particularly the northeast coast around Muscat, was more outward looking, with longstanding connections to Mesopotamia and Persia.

After the early days of Islam, the interior tribes were led by Imams, who held both spiritual and temporal power. The Yahmad branch of Azd tribes gained power in the 9th century. They established a system where the ulama of the Banu Sama, the largest of the Ibadi tribes of the interior, would select the Imam. The authority of the Imams declined due to power struggles, and in 1154 the Nabhani dynasty came to power as muluk, or kings, while the Imams were reduced to largely symbolic significance. The Imam had little moral authority since the title came to be treated as the property of the dominant tribe at any time. In 1507 the Portuguese captured the coastal city of Muscat, and gradually extended their control along the coast up to Sohar in the north and down to Sur in the southeast.

== Early rulers ==
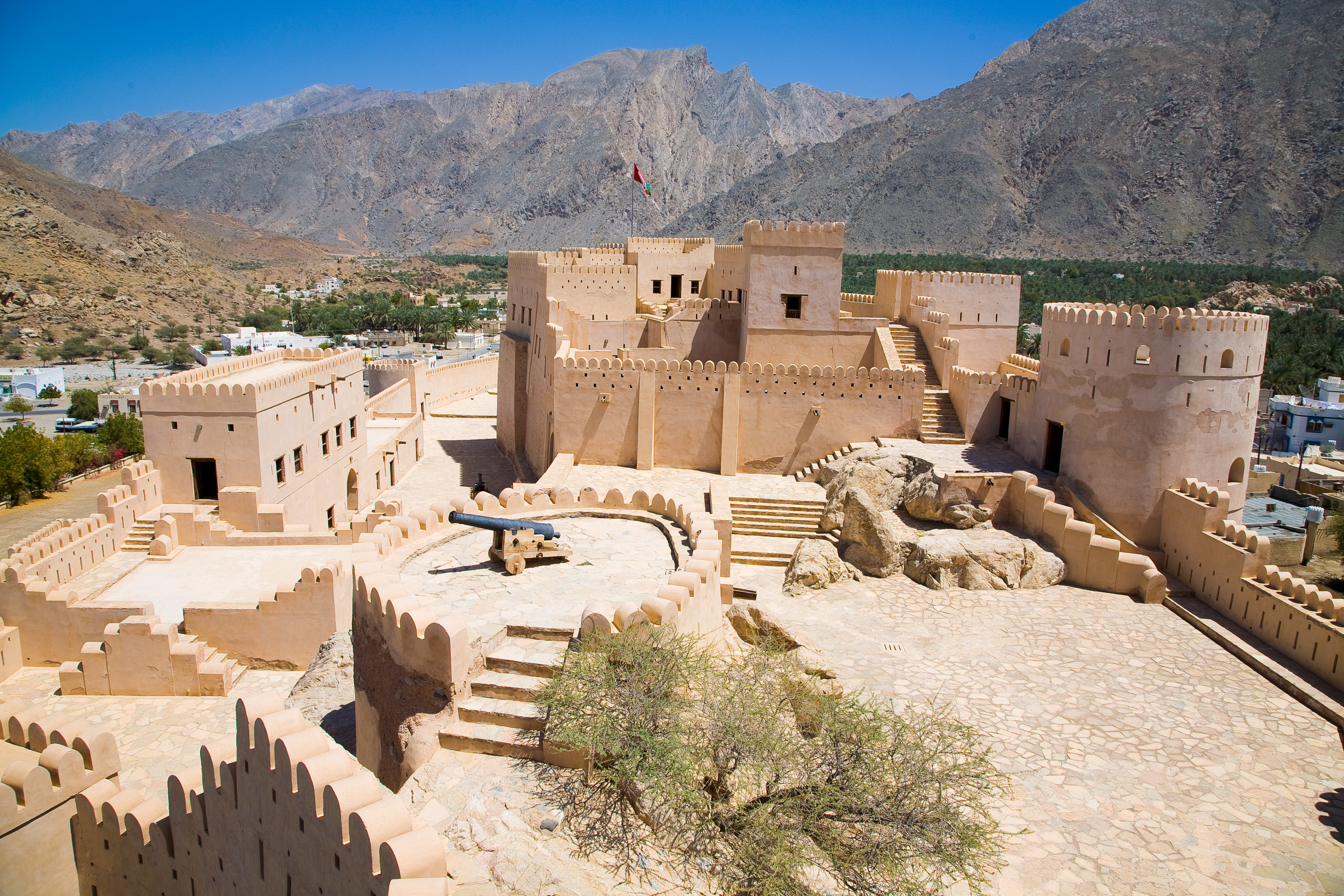
Nakhal Fort, a stronghold of the dynasty

The Al-Ya'ariba trace their descent from Ya'arab bin Kahtan, whom some date to about 800 BC. The family originated in Yemen and belonged to the Ghafiri faction. Nasir bin Murshid bin Sultan al Ya'Aruba (r. 1624-1649) was the first Imam of the Yaruba dynasty, elected in 1624. He moved the capital to Nizwa, the former capital of the Ibadhi Imamate. Nasir bin Murshid was able to unify the tribes with a common goal of expelling the Portuguese. He built up the Omani army and took the main towns as well as the forts of Rustaq and Nakhal. His forces threw the Portuguese out of Julfar (now Ras al-Khaimah) in 1633. In 1643 they took the fort at Sohar.

Nasir bin Murshid was succeeded by Sultan bin Saif (r. 1649-1688), his cousin. Sultan bin Saif completed the task of expelling the Portuguese. He captured Sur, Qurayyat and Muscat, expanded the fleet and attacked the Portuguese on the Gujarat coast. Under Sultan bin Seif and his successors Oman developed into a strong maritime power. In 1660 Omani forces attacked Mombasa, forcing the Portuguese to take refuge in Fort Jesus. There was continued fighting between the forces of Portugal and Oman in the East African coast in the years that followed.

Bil'arab bin Sultan (r. 1679-1692) succeeded as Imam in 1679 after the death of his father, Sultan bin Saif. This confirmed that the succession was now hereditary, since his father had also succeeded dynastically, while in the Ibadi tradition the Imam was elected. Most of his reign was occupied in a struggle with his brother, Saif bin Sultan, who succeeded Bil'arab bin Sultan when he died at Jabrin in 1692.

== Height of power ==
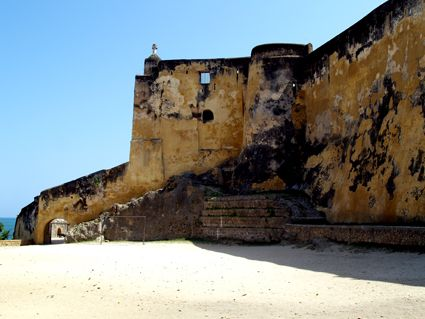
Fort Jesus on Mombasa Island

Saif bin Sultan (r. 1692-1711) invested in improving agriculture. He built aflaj in many parts of the interior to provide water, and planted date palms in the Al Batinah Region to encourage Arabs to move from the interior and settle along the coast. A large falaj was built to provide water for the town of Al Hamra, and it seems that the Ya'ariba supported major investment in settlement and agricultural works such as terracing along the Wadi Bani Awf. Saif bin Sultan built new schools. He made the castle of Rustaq his residence, adding the Burj al Riah wind tower.

In 1696 the Omanis again attacked Mombasa, besieging 2,500 people who had taken refuge in Fort Jesus. The Siege of Fort Jesus ended after 33 months when the thirteen survivors of famine and smallpox surrendered to the Omanis, who now became the dominant power on the coast. The expansion of Omani power included the first large-scale settlement of Zanzibar by Omani migrants. The Omanis became known to the Europeans as pirates, and attacked Portuguese bases in western India. The Omanis also moved into the Persian Gulf, taking Bahrain from the Persians and holding it for several years.

Saif bin Sultan died on 4 October 1711. He was buried in the castle of Rustaq in a tomb, later destroyed by a Wahhabi general. At his death he had great wealth, said to include 28 ships, 700 male slaves and one third of Oman's date trees. He was succeeded by his son. Sultan bin Saif II (r. 1711-1718) established his capital at Al-Hazm on the road from Rustaq to the coast. Now just a village, there still are remains of a fortress that he built around 1710, and which contains his tomb.

== Civil war and Persian invasions ==
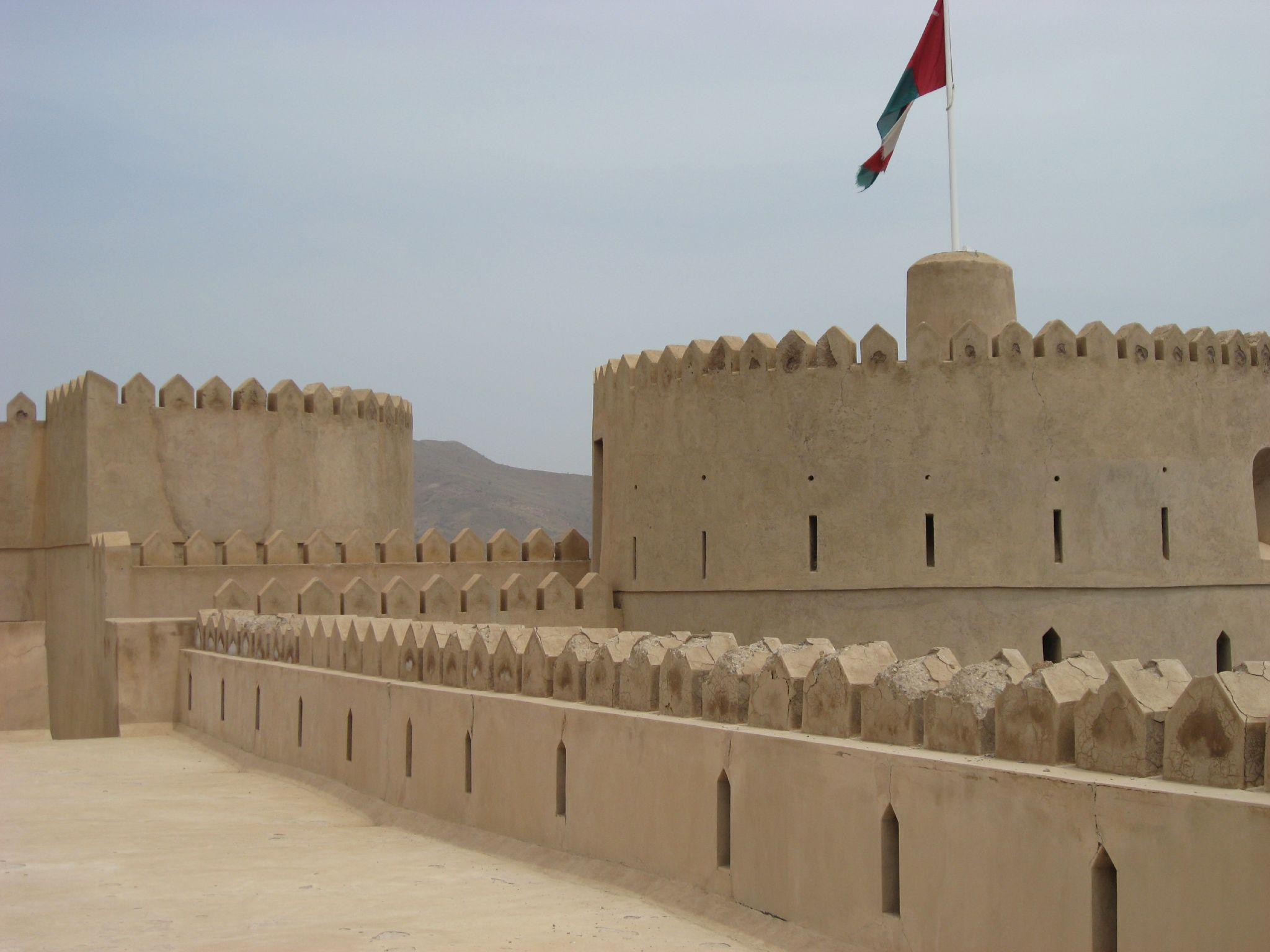
Rustaq fort, another important stronghold

When Sultan bin Saif II died in 1718 a struggle began between rival contenders for the Imamate. One faction supported the young boy Saif bin Sultan II while another supported Muhanna bin Sultan, who they felt was better qualified to become Imam. In 1719 Muhanna bin Sultan was brought into Rustaq Fort by stealth and proclaimed Imam. He was unpopular, and the next year was deposed and killed by his cousin Ya'arub bin Bal'arab. Ya'arub bin Bal'arab set up Saif bin Sultan II as the Imam and proclaimed himself Custodian. In May 1722 Ya'Arab took the next step and proclaimed himself Imam. This caused an uprising led by Bel'arab bin Nasir, a relative by marriage of the deposed Imam. In 1723 Ya'arub bin Bal'arab was deposed and Bal'arab bin Nasir became the Custodian.

A civil war commenced in which Muhammad bin Nasir seized power and was elected Imam in October 1724. His rival, Khalf bin Mubarak, stirred up trouble among the northern tribes. In an engagement at Sohar in 1728 both Khalf bin Mubarak and Muhammad bin Nasir were killed. The garrison of Sohar recognized Saif bin Sultan II as Imam, and he was re-installed at Nizwa. However, some of the inhabitants of Az Zahirah elected Saif's cousin Bal'arab bin Himyar as Imam. After early clashes, the rival Imams remained armed but avoided hostilities for a few years. Belarab controlled most of the interior, and gradually gained the ascendancy on land. Saif was only supported by the Beni Hina and a few allied tribes, but had the navy and the main seaports of Muscat, Burka and Sohar.

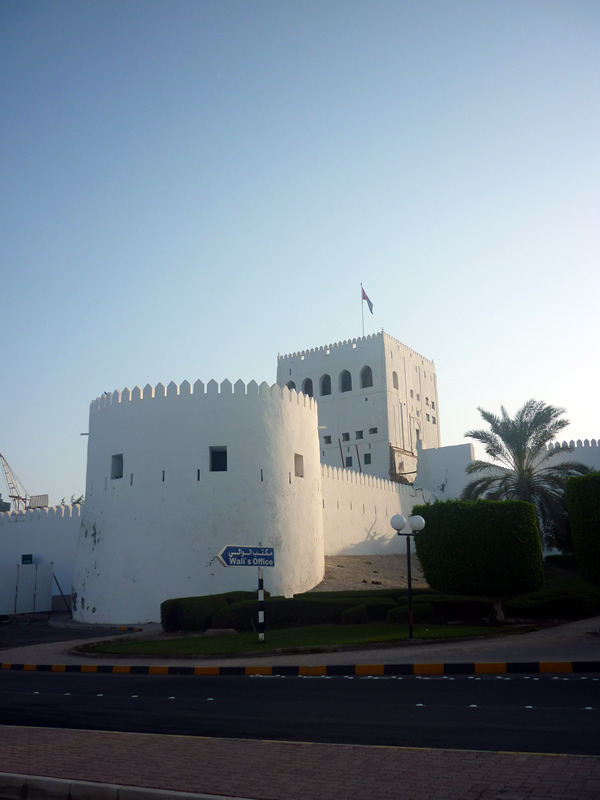
The fort at Sohar

With his power dwindling, Saif bin Sultan II eventually asked for help against his rival from Nader Shah of Persia. A Persian force arrived in March 1737. Saif bin Sultan joined the Persians. They marched to Az Zahirah where they met and routed the forces of Bal'arab bin Himyar. The Persians advanced through the interior, capturing towns, killing, looting and taking slaves. They then reembarked for Persia, taking their loot with them. For a few years after this Saif bin Sultan II was undisputed ruler, but he led a self-indulgent life, which turned the tribes against him. In February 1742 another member of the Yaruba family was proclaimed Imam, Sultan bin Murshid. Sultan bin Murshid was installed at Nakhal and began to hound Saif bin Sultan, who again appealed to the Persians for help and promised to cede Sohar to them.

A Persian expedition arrived at Julfar around October 1742. They besieged Sohar and sent forces to Muscat, but were unable to take either place. In 1743, Saif was tricked into letting the Persians take the last forts in Muscat. (Note: The story is that Saif and his companions became stupified with wine at a banquet attended by the Persians. The Persian leader stole his seal and forged orders to the commanders of the forts to give them up.) He died soon after. The Persians took Muscat and again attacked Sohar. The Imam Sultan bin Murshid was mortally wounded under the walls of Sohar in mid-1743. Bal'arab bin Himyar was elected Imam in his place. After enduring nine months of siege in Sohar, the governor Ahmad bin Said al-Busaidi negotiated an honorable surrender and was confirmed as governor of Sohar and Barka in return for payment of tribute. In 1744 he was elected Imam.

In 1747, the Afsharid king of Persia, Nadir Shah, was assassinated in Khorasan. Chaos followed his death. The Persian forces in Oman, as everywhere else in Persian Empire, faced a hierarchical and disciplinary vacuum, leading to massive desertion. Taking advantage of the situation, Ahmad invited the remaining Persian garrison to a banquet at his fort in Barka, where he massacred them.

At first some towns in the interior still adhered to Ya'ariba or other local leaders. On the coast of East Africa, Ahmad bin Said was recognized as Imam only by the governor of Zanzibar. Ahmad bin Said only became undisputed ruler of Oman when Bal'arab bin Himyar died in 1749. The Yaruba family retained some independence. It was not until 1869 that their last stronghold, the fort of al-Hayam in the Al Batinah Region, was taken by Azzan bin Qais.

== Rulers ==
- Nasir bin Murshid (1624–49)
- Sultan bin Saif (1649–88)
- Bil'arab bin Sultan (1688–92)
- Saif bin Sultan (1692-1711)
- Sultan bin Saif II (1711–18)
- Saif bin Sultan II (1718–19, 1720–22, 1723–24, 1728-42)
- Muhanna bin Sultan (1719–20)
- Ya'arab bin Bel'arab (1722–23)
- Muhammad bin Nasir (1724–28)
- Sultan bin Murshid (1742–43)
- Bal'arab bin Himyar (1728–37, 1743–49)

== Sources ==
- Agius, Dionisius A. (2012-12-06). Seafaring in the Arabian Gulf and Oman: People of the Dhow. Routledge. ISBN 978-1-136-20182-0.
- Beck, Sanderson (2004). "East Africa, Portuguese, and Arabs". Middle East & Africa to 1875.
- Davies, Charles E. (1997-01-01). The Blood-red Arab Flag: An Investigation Into Qasimi Piracy, 1797-1820. University of Exeter Press. ISBN 978-0-85989-509-5.
- Ibn-Razîk, Salîl (2010-06-03). History of the Imâms and Seyyids of 'Omân: From A.D. 661-1856. Cambridge University Press. ISBN 978-1-108-01138-9.
- JPM Guides (2000-03-01). Gulf States. Hunter Publishing, Inc. ISBN 978-2-88452-099-7.
- Limbert, Mandana (2010-06-07). In the Time of Oil: Piety, Memory, and Social Life in an Omani Town. Stanford University Press. ISBN 978-0-8047-7460-4.
- Miles, Samuel Barrett (1919). The Countries and Tribes of the Persian Gulf. Garnet & Ithaca Press. ISBN 978-1-873938-56-0.
- Ochs, Peter J. (1999-11-01). Maverick Guide to Oman. Pelican Publishing. ISBN 978-1-4556-0865-2.
- "Oman From the Dawn of Islam". Omannet. Oman Ministry of Information. Archived from the original on 2013-11-11.
- Plekhanov, Sergey (2004). A Reformer on the Throne: Sultan Qaboos Bin Said Al Said. Trident Press Ltd. p. 49. ISBN 978-1-900724-70-8.
- Rabi, Uzi (2011). Emergence of States in a Tribal Society: Oman Under Sa'Id Bin Taymur, 1932-1970. Apollo Books. ISBN 978-1-84519-473-4.
- Siebert, Stefan (2005). Analysis of Arid Agricultural Systems Using Quantitative Image Analysis, Modeling and Geographical Information Systems. kassel university press GmbH. ISBN 978-3-89958-192-8.
- Thomas, Gavin (2011-11-01). The Rough Guide to Oman. Penguin. ISBN 978-1-4053-8935-8.
