= Muhanna bin Sultan =

- Imam

Imam of Oman (interior)
- Reign: 1719–1720
- Predecessor: Saif bin Sultan II
- Successor: Saif bin Sultan II
- Died: 1720

Muhanna bin Sultan (Arabic: مهنا بن سلطان) (died 1720) was one of the rival Imams at the start of the 1718-1744 Omani Civil War in the final years of the Yaruba dynasty. He held power briefly in 1719–1720 before being deposed and murdered.

== Background ==
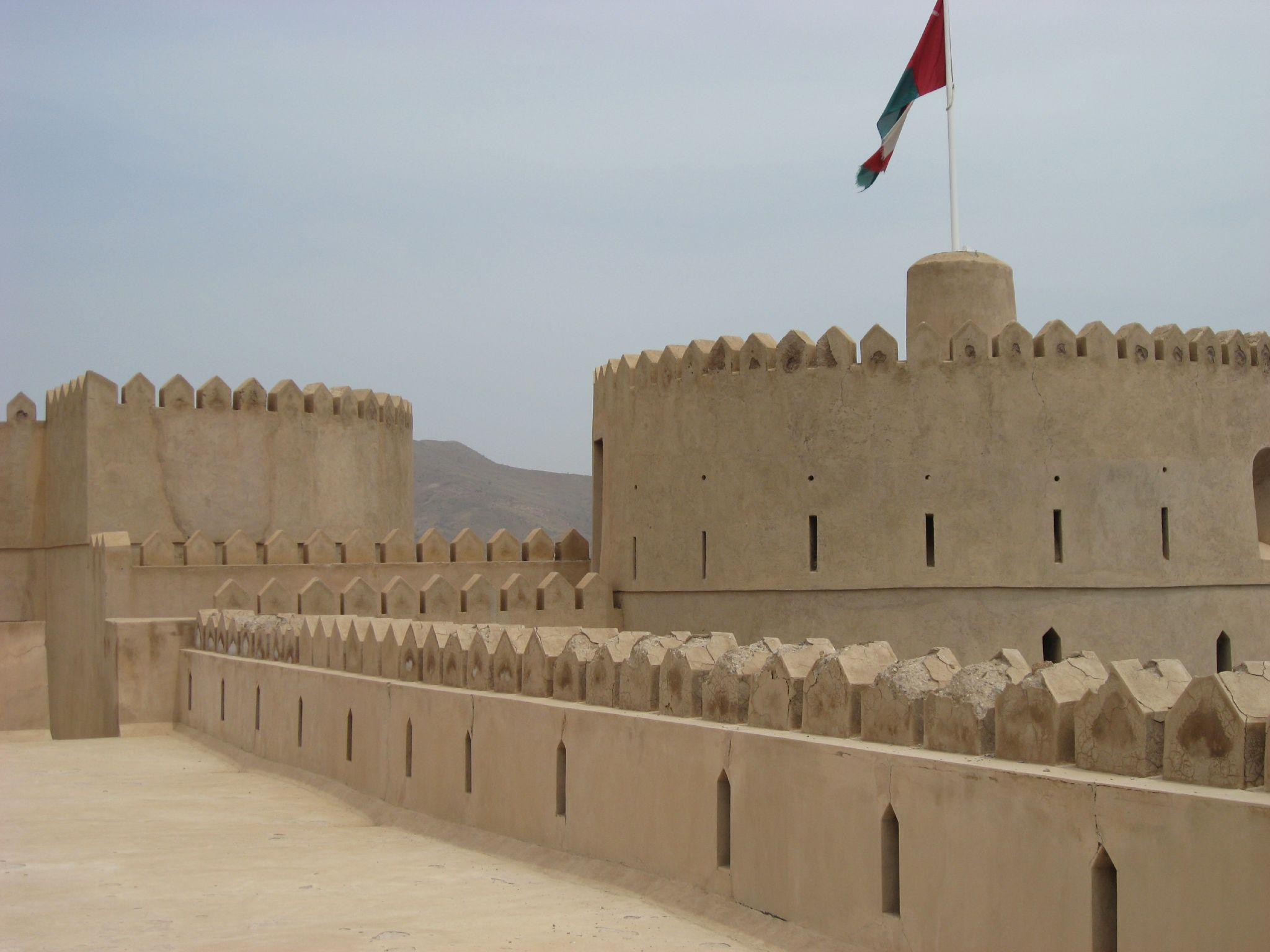
Rustaq fort

Muhanna bin Sultan was a younger brother of the great Imam Saif bin Sultan (r. 1692–1711). (Note: According to another version of history, he belonged to a distant branch of the Yaruba Dynasty, being the son of Sultan, son of Majid, son of Mubarak, son of Bal'arab) He was the great-uncle of Saif bin Sultan II, the eldest son of Sultan bin Saif II (r. 1611–1718). Saif bin Sultan II was aged twelve when his father died in 1718. In theory the office of Imam was elected, but in practice for many years it had been inherited by members of the Ya'Aruba family. Saif bin Sultan II was therefore seen as the natural successor to his father. However, there was support for appointing Muhenna as regent during Saif's minority.

An assembly of Sheikhs and other notable people was convened at Rustaq, where the Kadhi Adey bin Suliman was persuaded to proclaim Saif bin Sultan II the Imam, albeit reluctantly. (Note: Another account says that to avoid stirring up the crowd, the ulama staged a public ceremony where it seemed that they were presenting Saif bin Sultan II as Imam, but their wording was ambiguous and they had not in fact elected him.) Although Saif was popular among the people, the ulama considered he was too young to hold office and favored Muhanna as Imam. Muhanna was well-qualified since he was learned, wise and careful in his decisions.

== Reign ==
Muhanna bin Sultan was apparently elected Imam by the ulama in May 1719 in the citadel at Nizwa. The ulama had not first obtained tribal consensus, as was customary. Around the end of 1719 Muhanna's supporters smuggled him into the castle at Rustaq and recognized him as Imam. Muhanna proved to be a sensible ruler, careful to consult the religious leaders over any decisions. He abolished the tariffs in the port of Muscat, which caused trade to double and the economy to flourish. In 1720 a squadron of ships from Muscat defeated a squadron of Portuguese transports that was on its way to pick up Persian troops for an attempt to regain the Persian Gulf islands held by the Arabs of Muscat.

== Deposition and death ==
However, the public still favored Saif bin Sultan II, and were stirred up by Ya'Arab bin Bel'Arab, his cousin. Ya'Arab raised forces and marched on Muscat, which he took. He then turned towards Rustaq. As he advanced, Muhanna's supported deserted him. Muhanna tried to find safety in the fort at Rustaq. He was offered protection if he left. When he accepted, he was captured, thrown in prison and then murdered. He died around the end of 1720. This began a period of violent tribal hostilities. Ya'Arab bin Bel'Arab re-installed Saif bin Sultan II and declared himself regent during the minority of his cousin. In May 1722 Ya'Arab took the next step and proclaimed himself Imam.
