= Saif bin Sultan II =

- Imam

Imam of the Omani Empire
- Reign: 1718–1719
- Predecessor: Sultan bin Saif II
- Successor: Muhanna bin Sultan
- Reign: 1720–1722
- Predecessor: Muhanna bin Sultan
- Successor: Ya'arab bin Bel'arab
- Reign: 1723–1724
- Predecessor: Ya'arab bin Bel'arab
- Successor: Muhammad bin Nasir
- Reign: 1728–1742 (coastal area)
- Predecessor: Muhammad bin Nasir
- Successor: Sultan bin Murshid
- Died: 1743
- Dynasty: Yaruba
- Father: Sultan bin Saif II

Saif bin Sultan II (Arabic: سيف بن سلطان الثاني) (c. 1706 – 1743) was the sixth of the Yaruba dynasty of Imams of Oman, a member of the Ibadi sect. He held the position of Imam four times during the Omani Civil War.

Saif bin Sultan II inherited leadership of the country as a child, but was pushed aside in favor of his brother. His brother was deposed, and Saif was again proclaimed Imam, although power was held by a regent who later proclaimed himself Imam. The regent was deposed, Saif was proclaimed Imam again, and after a civil war was again deposed in 1724. Fighting continued, and in 1728 Saif became Imam for the fourth and last time. He was forced to share power with a rival Imam who controlled the interior. A civil war ensued in which the country was divided. Saif bin Sultan II twice called for help from Persia. The first time the Persians looted the towns and caused great destruction before leaving. The second time they set about conquering the country. Saif bin Sultan II was deposed in 1742 and died in 1743.

== Puppet ruler ==
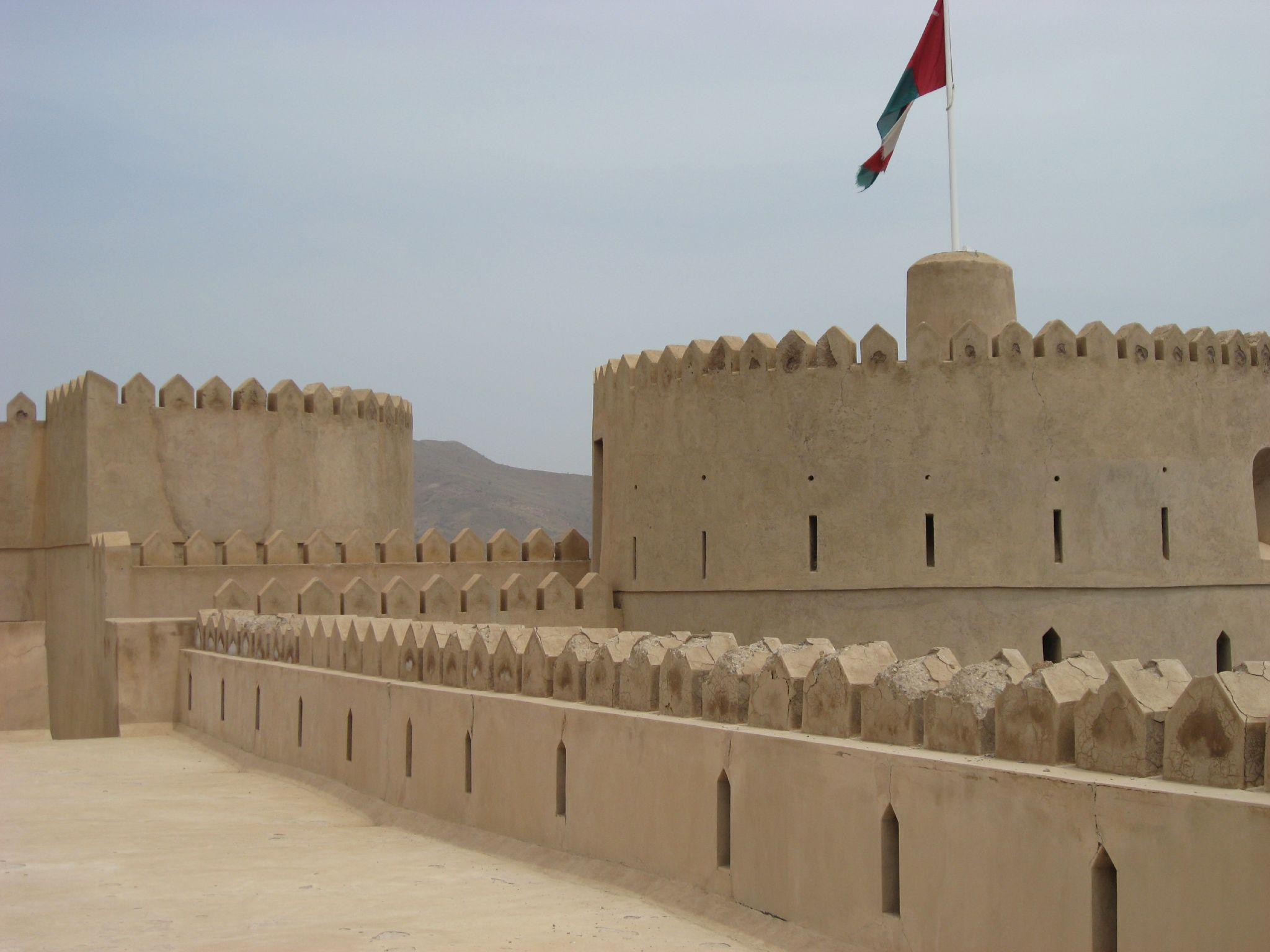
Rustaq fort, which Saif bin Sultan II used as his base

Saif bin Sultan II was aged about twelve when his father, the Imam Sultan bin Saif II, died in 1718. Although he had been named as successor and was popular among the people, the ulama decided he was too young to hold office and favored his great-uncle Muhanna bin Sultan. In 1719 Muhanna bin Sultan was brought into Rustaq Fort by stealth and proclaimed Imam. Muhanna was unpopular, and in 1720 was deposed and killed by his cousin Ya'arub bin Bal'arab. Ya'arub bin Bal'arab restored Saif bin Sultan II as the Imam and proclaimed himself Custodian. In May 1722 Ya'Arab took the next step and proclaimed himself Imam. This caused an uprising led by Bel'arab bin Nasir, a relative by marriage of the deposed Imam. In 1723 Ya'arub bin Bal'arab was deposed and Bal'arab bin Nasir became the Custodian.

Soon after, Muhammad bin Nasir al Ghafiri led his Nizari tribes in a revolt. He was opposed by a faction led by Khalf bin Mubarak of the Bani Hina tribe, and therefore called the Hinawi. Muhammad bin Nasir al Ghafiri gained the upper hand, capturing Saif bin Sultan II and his uncle Bil'arab. Muhammad bin Nasir was elected Imam in October 1724. His rival, Khalf bin Mubarak, stirred up trouble among the northern tribes. In an engagement at Sohar in 1728 both Khalf bin Mubarak and Muhammad bin Nasir were killed. The garrison of Sohar recognized Saif bin Sultan II as Imam, and he was re-installed at Nizwa.

== Divided rule ==
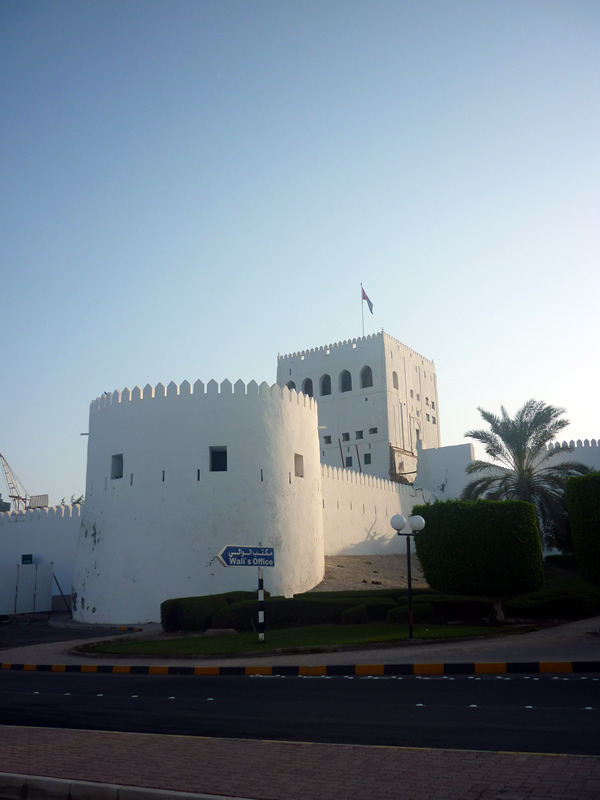
The fort at Sohar

Soon after Saif bin Sultan II had been installed, some of the inhabitants of Az Zahirah elected Saif's cousin Bal'arab bin Himyar as Imam. From this time the country was divided between the Ghafiri (Sunni) and the Hinawi (Ibadi) factions. After early clashes, the rival Imams remained armed but avoided hostilities for a few years. Bel'arab controlled most of the interior, and gradually gained the ascendancy on land. Saif was only supported by the Beni Hina and a few allied tribes, but had the navy and the main seaports of Muscat, Burka and Sohar. Saif adopted an extravagant lifestyle at his residence in Rustaq, developing a love of Shirazi wine.

With his power dwindling, Saif bin Sultan II eventually asked for help against his rival from Nader Shah of Persia. A Persian force arrived in March 1737. Saif bin Sultan joined the Persians. They marched to Az Zahirah where they met and routed the forces of Bal'arab bin Himyar. The Persians advanced through the interior, capturing towns, killing, looting and taking slaves. They then reembarked for Persia, taking their loot with them. For a few years after this Saif bin Sultan II was undisputed ruler, but continued his a self-indulgent life, which turned the tribes against him.

== Deposition and death ==
In February 1742 another member of the Yaruba family was proclaimed Imam, Sultan bin Murshid. Sultan bin Murshid was installed at Nakhal and began to hound Saif bin Sultan, who again appealed to the Persians for help and promised to cede Sohar to them. A Persian expedition arrived at Julfar around October 1742. They besieged Sohar and sent forces to Muscat, but were unable to take either place. In 1743 Saif was tricked into letting the Persians take Fort Al Jalali and Fort Al-Mirani, which guarded the harbor of Muscat. (Note: The story is that Saif and his companions became stupified with wine at a banquet arranged by the Persians. The Persian leader stole his seal and forged orders to the commanders of the forts to give them up.) He died soon after.

The Imam Sultan bin Murshid was mortally wounded under the walls of Sohar in mid-1743. Bal'arab bin Himyar was elected Imam in his place. In 1744 Ahmad bin Said al-Busaidi, governor of the Sohar garrison, was elected as a rival Imam, founding the dynasty that continues to rule Oman. In 1747 he succeeded in destroying the last Persian force in Oman. Ahmad bin Said became undisputed ruler of Oman when Bal'arab bin Himyar died in 1749.
