= Ahmad bin Said al-Busaidi =

Imam and Sultan of Oman from 1744 to 1783

Ahmed bin Said

Imam and Sultan of Oman
- Reign: 1744–1783
- Predecessor: Saif bin Sultan II
- Successor: Said bin Ahmad
- Born: 1694; Adam, Yarubid Imamate
- Died: 15 December 1783 (aged 89); Al-Batinah Fort, Rustaq, Omani Empire
- Burial: Western Fort
Names
- Ahmad bin Sa'id bin Ahmad bin Muhammad bin Abdelmajid bin Sa'id bin Mubarak Al-Busaidi Al-Azdi Al-Ammani Al-Ibadhi
- Dynasty: Al Bu Said
- Father: Said bin Muhammad

Ahmad bin Said al-Busaidi (1694 – 15 December 1783) was the first ruler of Oman of the Al Bu Said dynasty. He came to power during the Omani Civil War and when the Persians had occupied large parts of the country. During his long rule as Imam, the country prospered and regained its leading position in the Persian Gulf.

== Early years ==
Ahmad bin Sa’id bin Ahmad bin Muhammad bin Abdelmajid Al-Busaidi Al-Azdi Al-Ammani Al-Ibadhi was born in the city of Adam, Oman, in 1694, the son of Sa’id bin Ahmad Al-Busaidi. Ahmad bin Sa’id came from the Al Bu Sa’id, a small Hinawi tribe from the interior of Oman. He was great-great-grandson of Mubarak al-Saidi al-Azdy of the Banu Hiba. It was said that he began as a wood vendor and worked his way up. He became a leading merchant of the port city of Sohar. In 1737 he was appointed governor of this city.

The sixth Imam of Oman of the Yaruba dynasty was Saif bin Sultan II, who came to power during a period of civil war and lost popularity due to his indulgent lifestyle. Saif called for military help from Persia, and in 1737 Persian troops arrived led by Nader Shah. They began to conquer the country. The Persians left in 1738 but returned from 1742 to 1744. By 1742 the Persians were in control of much of the country. Saif was tricked into letting them take the key forts of al Jalali and al Mirani in Muscat while drunk at a banquet. He died soon after, the last of his dynasty. The Persians took Muscat and then attacked Sohar to the north. After enduring nine months of siege, Ahmad bin Sa’id negotiated an honorable surrender. The Persian commander Taqi Khan confirmed him as governor of Sohar and Barka in return for payment of tribute.

== Assumption of power ==
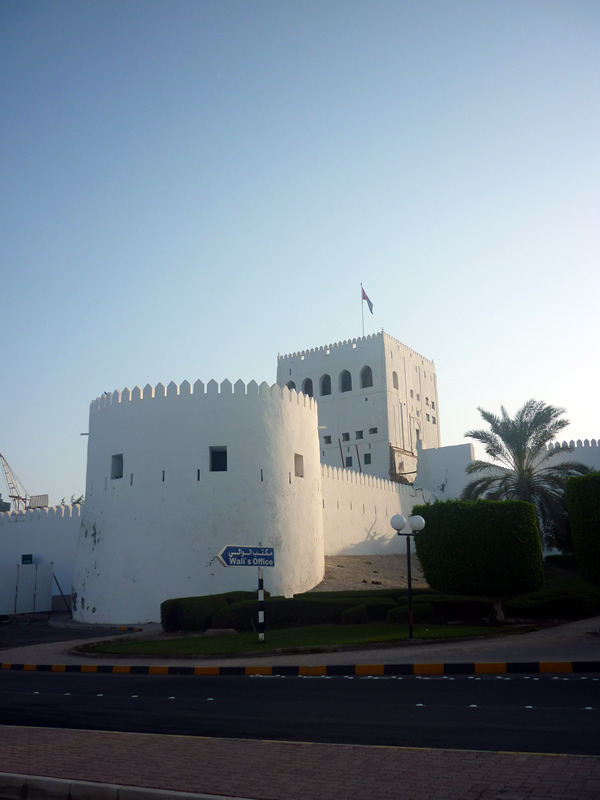
Sohar castle today.

By late 1744 during the Omani Civil War, Ahmad had control over large parts of Oman. Bal'arab bin Himyar of the Yaruba had been elected Imam in 1743, and retained the support of some of the Ghafiri of Dhahireh and the Semail. Bal'arab bin Himyar raised a strong force and advanced on Muscat, but was unable to take that town. He then attempted to take Sohar. Ahmad went to town's aid but was deserted by his troops at the Battle of Bithnah around the start of 1745 and forced to flee. Ahmad used excuses to delay paying tribute, and as a result the Persians could not pay their troops in Muscat and many deserted. In 1747, Ahmad invited the remaining Persian troops to a banquet at his fort in Barka where he orchestrated a massacre.

The 19th century Omani historian and poet Salil Ibn Raziq provided a detailed account of the event passed down through his father and grandfather:

…when the Persians came from Muscat to Barka, accompanied by Khamis bin Salim… - Ahmad bin Said being there at the time – they pitched their tents in the plain, and no one could traverse any part of Barka without seeing cauldrons of meat being prepared for the Persians by Ahmad bin Said’s orders; and no one could pass through the streets or markets without seeing sweetmeats being made for them; nor could any one go near a cultivated spot without witnessing the produce being collected, under the same authority, for the horses of the Persians; and no one went to rest assured he could withhold a fals, much less a dirhem, from Ahmad bin Said, if he should demand it for the entertainment of his guests.

This led to much murmuring among the people, who were unanimous in saying that the Persians rather deserved death at their hands than such profuse hospitality… after the Persians had been encamped three days at Barka, large dishes of meat were forwarded to their tents, and their chief officers were invited to a grand banquet. As many as fifty accordingly entered the fort with Ahmad bin Said’s messenger. About half an hour afterwards the drum of the fort was sounded, and the crier proclaimed aloud: “Any one who has a grudge against the Persians may now take his revenge.”

No sooner were these words uttered, than the cry was repeated on all sides, and the youth of Barka following the lead of their elders, and of those who were assembled at the place from other districts, fell upon the Persians and put them all to the sword, with the exception of two hundred. These exclaimed " quarter! quarter!" and on hearing their voices Ahmad bin Said ordered the crier to proclaim a suspension of the slaughter. The chiefs who had entered the fort, however, were all put to death. Ahmad bin Said then directed the mariners of Barka, to transport the survivors to Bandar Abbas, but… the seamen set fire to the ships, swam to land themselves, and left the Persians to be drowned.

— Salil Ibn Raziq, History of the Imâms and Seyyids of ‘Omân: From A.D. 661–1856, pp. 153-154

Contrary to Ibn Raziq's records, other historical accounts suggest that the Persians voluntarily withdrew on their own accord, rather than through pressure exerted by Ahmad. Jeremy Jones and Nicholas Ridout argue that his account was ‘designed to make a better historical narrative of the events, more befitting a man who was… worthy of such praise as the founder of an Omani political dynasty’ that had ruled for a century.

For several years Bal'arab bin Himyar was recognized as the true Imam, fully controlling the interior, while Ahmed remained on the coast. On the coast of East Africa, Ahmad bin Sa'id was recognized as Imam only by the governor of Zanzibar. In 1749 Ahmad gathered an army and moved against Bal'arab, who was encamped near Jebel Akhdar with inferior forces. In the final battle, in the second half of 1749, Bal'arab was defeated and killed. This was the end of Yaruba power. Ahmad was now the undisputed ruler of Oman. In 1749 the Ibadi tribes of Oman elected Ahmad bin Said as their Imam. His election took place on 9 June 1749 at Rustaq.

== Reign ==
Ahmad bin Said had widespread popular support as the person who had liberated the country from the Persian occupiers. He quickly consolidated his power through whatever techniques were expedient. A ship owner and trader in outlook, he saw the economic potential of Oman's position on the trade routes, and gained allegiance from the tribal leaders by engaging them in commercial ventures. Ahmad bin Said made his seat at Rustaq. From there he ruled for 39 generally peaceful years, although he had to deal with intrigues by members of the deposed Ya'Aruba family, by other tribes and by two of his sons.

Ahmad bin Said encouraged the development of agriculture and maritime trading. For the first time in the history of Oman Ahmad bin Said maintained a permanent army and navy. In the late 1770s he attempted to gain control of the Strait of Hormuz between the Gulf of Oman and the Persian Gulf, a key position. Ahmad bin Said reestablished the leading position of Oman among the Persian Gulf states.

== Family ==
Ahmad bin Said had several sons and daughters. His eldest son Hilal was disqualified from the succession since he was blind. His second son Said bin Ahmad was his heir. His third son Qais bin Ahmad Al Busaidi later became governor of Sohar and founder of the al-Qais cadet branch through which Azzan bin Qais was later able to secure his claim to the Sultanate in 1868. His fourth and fifth sons were Saif and Sultan bin Ahmad, both children of his fourth wife, a sister of Shaikh Muhammad bin Nasir al-Jabry al-Ghafiry, of Zhahirah. Shaikh Abdallah Rocky Amir Muhammad was a strong leader of the Nizariya faction, and under the Yarubi had once been governor of Bahrain. His two youngest sons were Talib, later governor of Nakhal and then of Rustaq, and Muhammad, later Governor-General of Mombasa and Oman's East African possessions. The eldest of his three daughters, Moza, became a power in family affairs and acted as guardian and supporter of her nephews Salim and Sa'id.

On 1 February 1775 Ahmad turned over responsibility for routine administration to his son, Said bin Ahmad, while retaining the title of Imam. Ahmad bin Said's sons Sultan and Saif rebelled in 1781, and took control of the forts of al-Mirani and al-Jalali that guarded the harbor of Muscat. They kidnapped their brother Said bin Ahmad and imprisoned him in al Jalali. Ahmad returned to Muscat early the next year, captured al-Mirani, and after bombarding al-Jalali from al-Mirani and from ships on the other side managed to regain control.

Ahmad bin Said died on 15 December 1783 at Al-Batinah Fort, Rustaq. He is buried there at the Western Fort, near the Great Mosque. Said bin Ahmad was elected Imam as his successor. His descendants continued to rule Oman, although they did not have the religious authority of the Imams of the Ibadi Muslim tradition. Ahmad bin Said was the only ruler of his dynasty who was clearly an Imam, elected in the traditional way. His son was also elected, but abdicated soon after, although retaining the title of Imam. After that, members of the dynasty were sultans of Muscat, with until 1959 only limited authority over the interior of Oman.
