= Sultan bin Saif II =

Imam of the Omani Empire
- Reign: 1711-1718
- Predecessor: Saif bin Sultan
- Successor: Saif bin Sultan II
- Dynasty: Yaruba

Sultan bin Saif II (Arabic: سلطان الثاني اليعربي) was the fifth of the Yaruba dynasty of Imams of Oman, a member of the Ibadi sect. He ruled from 1711 to 1718. After his death, leaving a young son as his successor, the country degenerated into a civil war.

Sultan bin Saif II succeeded his father, Saif bin Sultan, when he died in 1711. He established his capital at Al-Hazm on the road from Rustaq to the coast. Now just a village, there still are remains of a great fortress that he built there around 1710, which contains his tomb.

When Sultan bin Saif II died in 1718, his popular twelve-year-old son Saif bin Sultan II was nominal successor. The ulama instead elected Saif's older brother Muhanna as Imam, who was soon replaced by his cousin Ya'arab bin Bel'arab, who then had to resign in favor of Saif bin Sultan II. A civil war commenced.
