= Saif bin Sultan =

Imam of the Omani Empire from 1692 to 1711

Imam of the Omani Empire
- Reign: 1692–4 October 1711
- Predecessor: Bil'arab bin Sultan
- Successor: Sultan bin Saif II
- Died: 4 October 1711
- Dynasty: Yaruba

Saif bin Sultan (Arabic: سيف بن سلطان) was the fourth of the Yaruba dynasty Imams of Oman, a member of the Ibadi sect. He ruled from 1692 to 1711, during which Omani presence became firmly established on the coast of East Africa.

== Early years ==
Saif bin Sultan was the son of the second Yaruba Imam, Sultan bin Saif. On his father's death, his brother Bil'arab bin Sultan became Imam in 1679. Later, Saif bin Sultan fell out with his brother, built up his forces and besieged Bil'arab in Jabrin. After Bil'arab died there in 1692/93, Saif bin Sultan became Imam.

== Imam ==
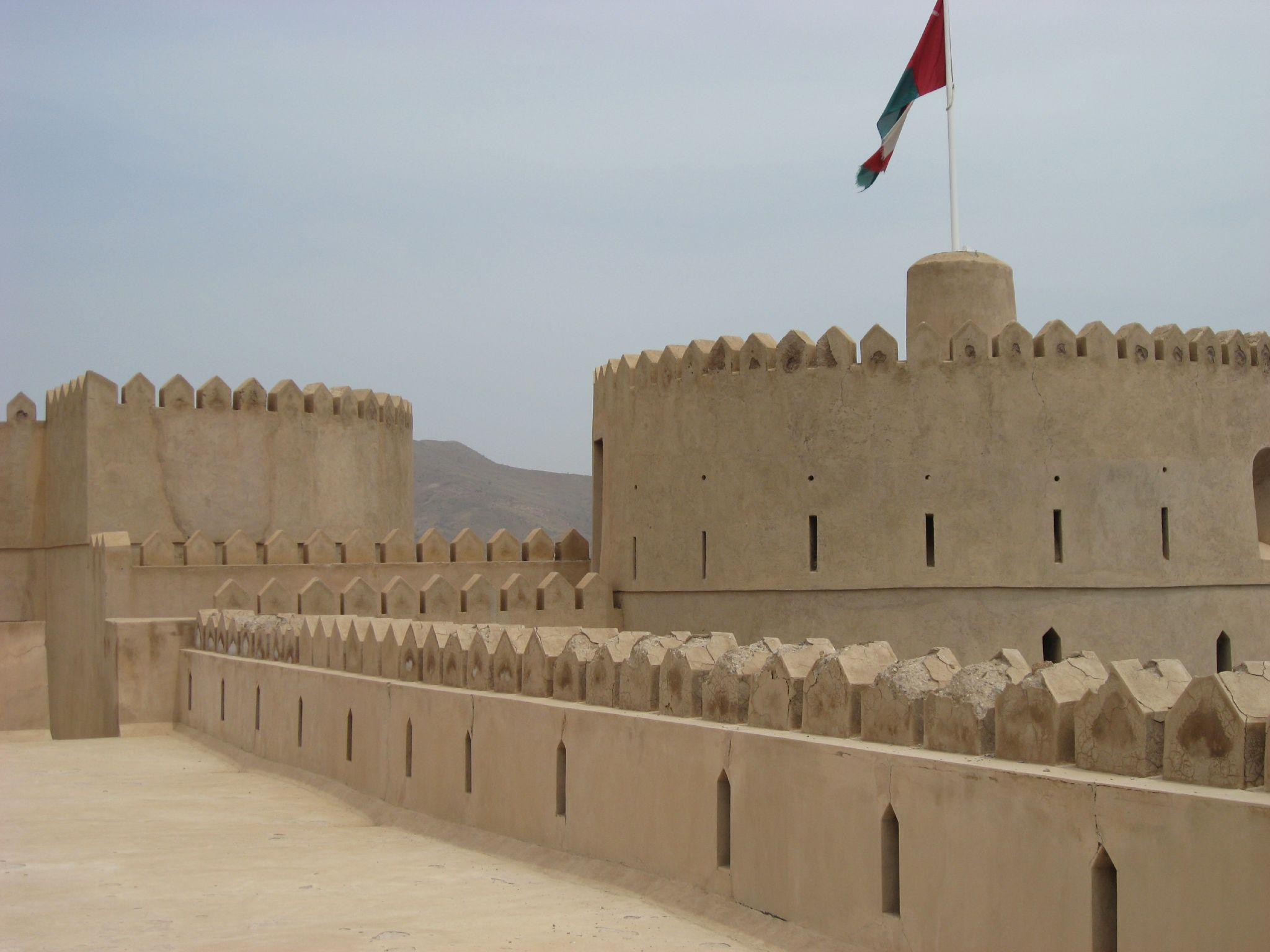
The castle of Rustaq

Saif bin Sultan invested in improving agriculture, building aflaj in many parts of the interior to provide water, and planting date palms in the Al Batinah Region to encourage Arabs to move from the interior and settle along the coast. He built new schools. He made the castle of Rustaq his residence, adding the Burj al Riah wind tower.

Saif bin Sultan continued the struggle against the Portuguese on the East African coast. In 1696, his forces attacked Mombasa, besieging 2,500 people who had taken refuge in Fort Jesus. The Siege of Fort Jesus ended after 33 months when the thirteen survivors of famine and smallpox surrendered. Soon after the Omanis took Pemba Island, Kilwa and Zanzibar.

The expansion of Omani power included the first large-scale settlement of Zanzibar by Omani migrants. Saif bin Sultan appointed Arab governors to the city states of the coast before he returned to Oman. Later, many of these were to come under the control of Muhammed bin Uthman al-Mazrui, governor of Mombasa, and his descendants, the Mazrui, who made only nominal acknowledgement of the suzerainty of Oman. Saif bin Sultan also encouraged piracy against the merchant trade of India, Persia and even of Europe.

== Death and legacy ==
Saif bin Sultan died on 4 October 1711. He was buried in the castle of Rustaq in a handsome tomb, later destroyed by a Wahhabi general. At his death he had great wealth, said to include 28 ships, 700 male slaves and one third of Oman's date trees. He was succeeded by his son Sultan bin Saif II. Saif bin Sultan earned the title "the Earth's bond" or "the chain of the Earth" for the benefits he had brought to the people of Oman. According to Samuel Barrett Miles,

The Imam Saif bin Sultan was the greatest of the Yaareba Princes, and at no time before or since has Oman been so renowned, powerful or prosperous as under his sway. Ambition and love of glory, combine with a lust for wealth, were his ruling passions, and in pursuit of these objects he was as unscrupulous and unswerving as he was capable and energetic. ... We hear but little in the local historians of internal troubles and wars during his reign; we may therefore infer that the Imam had the skill and tact to divert the more restless and ambitious spirits from tribal broils, jealousies and dissensions by employing them in piratical and other expeditions, and in encouraging them to venture their trading operations in distant regions, for it is beyond question that under his auspices the commerce of Oman greatly extended and developed.
