= Siege of Muscat (1650) =

- Part of the Omani–Portuguese conflicts
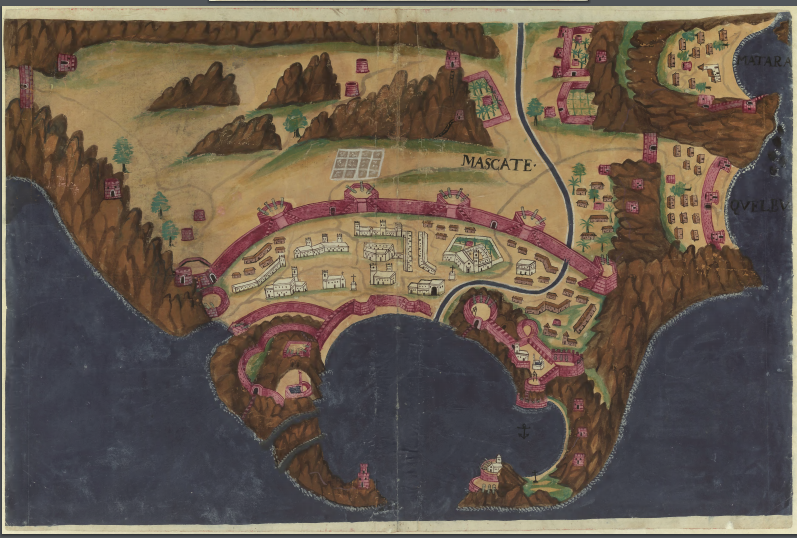
- Watercolour plan of Muscat in 1635, by António Bocarro, in Livro das Plantas de Todas as Fortalezas, Cidades e Povoações do Estado da Índia Oriental
Date	Late 1649 – January 1650
Location	Muscat 23°36′55″N 58°35′38″E
Result	Omani victory

Belligerents
(Kingdom of Portugal) Portuguese Empire	Omani Empire

Commanders and leaders
(Kingdom of Portugal) Pereira (surrendered) (Kingdom of Portugal) Naruttam (Kingdom of Portugal) Cabreta †	Sultan bin Saif

Casualties and losses
All but 60 or 70 killed	4,000–5,000 killed

The siege of Muscat occurred in 1650, when an Omani army under Sultan bin Saif attacked the Portuguese fort of Muscat and captured the town from the Portuguese, ending the long Portuguese occupation of Muscat.

== Background ==
By 1648, all of the Portuguese possessions in Oman had fallen to the Yarubids, and they were only left with Muscat, Muttrah and Khasab. On August 16, 1648, the Omani leader Sa'id bin Khalifa besieged Muscat. The place managed to hold out until September 11, when the Portuguese asked for a peace treaty. As the ammunition of the garrison was all used, the Omanis imposed their own conditions: the fortresses of Qurayyat and Dibba should be demolished, the Omani fortress at Muttrah should be recognized, merchants in the highlands would not pay tribute to the Portuguese, and the walls of Muscat should be demolished.

The Portuguese refused these terms and continued the siege until they heard of the surrender of Mocala Hills to the Omanis without any resistance while a plague struck the garrison. Finally, on October 31, the Portuguese would finally make a peace treaty, with the following conditions: the fortresses of Qurayyat, Dibba, and Muttrah would be demolished along with the Omani fort of the latter; Muttrah would be neutral; Omani vessels could navigate outwards without reserve except in Portuguese lands, where they would need a passport to enter; Omanis would pay no customs; and all Omani fortresses in Muscat would be demolished.

When this news reached Lisbon on March 16, 1650, the Portuguese king was dismayed at this peace treat and ordered Julião de Noronha, the captain of Muscat, to be arrested and sent to Goa. During this year, Nasir bin Murshid died in April and was succeeded by Sultan bin Saif. The first thing the new Imam did was prepare for the siege of Muscat.

== Prelude ==
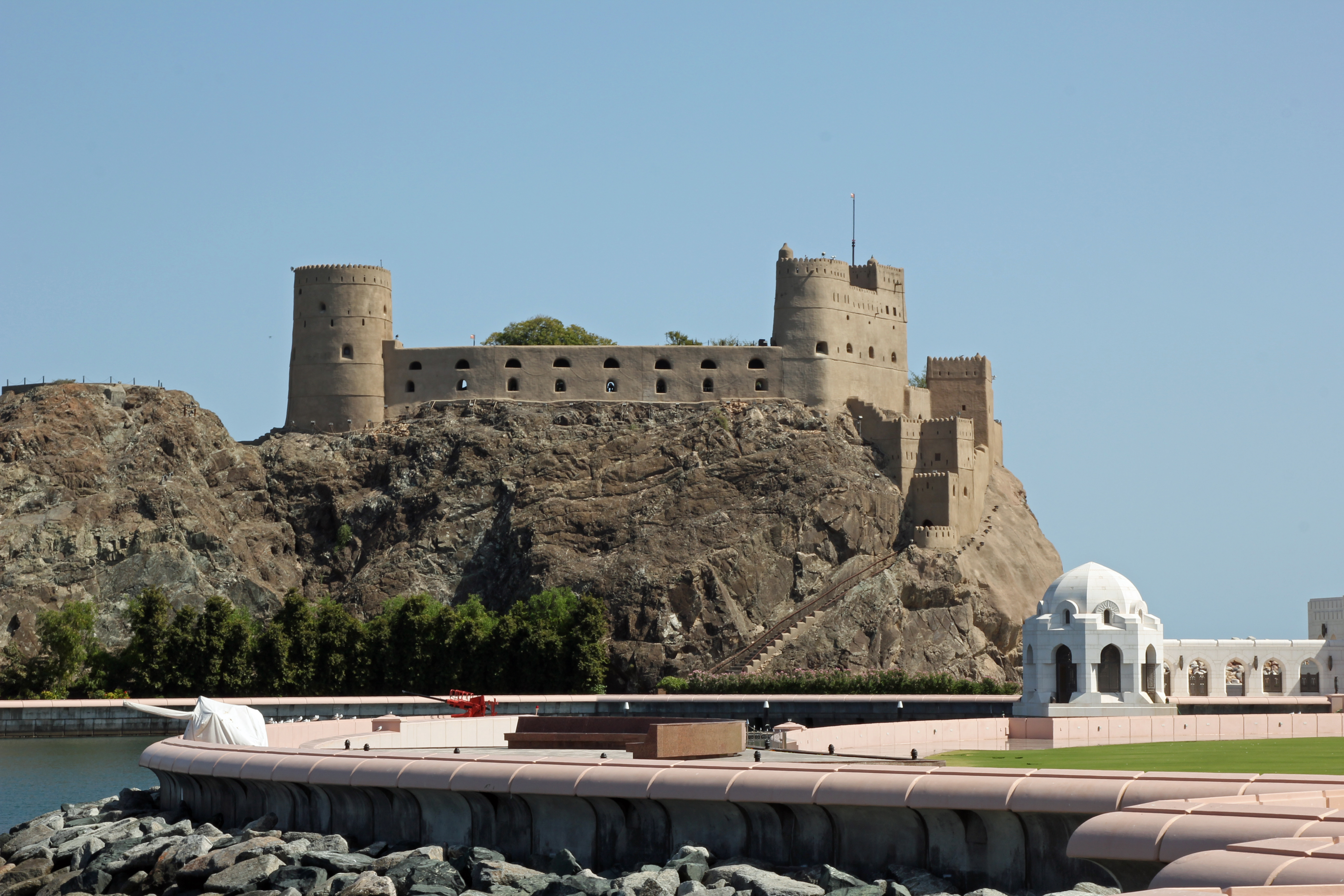
São João fort

The Portuguese garrison of Muscat consisted of European men and Indian mercenaries from Goa; these troops took defensive positions outside the fort in hills and mountains nearby. The Portuguese fortresses São João and Capitão were the headquarters for leadership, supplies, and cannons; they were both heavily fortified. The Portuguese and Indian infantry were distributed in the Sa'ali and Mocala mountains. One of their mountain fortresses was a block shape that controlled the route to Muscat, which they blocked with iron chains.

== Siege of Muscat ==
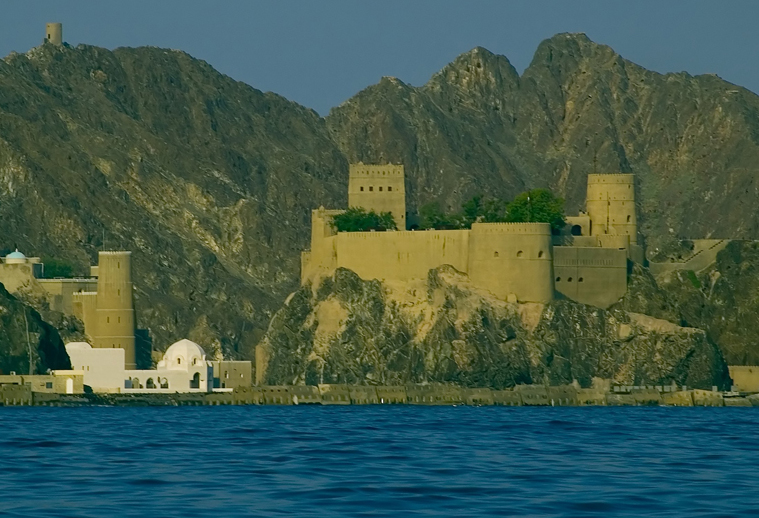
Capitão fort

Imam Sultan had been preparing his army at Tuwa al-Rowla, a place near Muttrah, which he took as his base. He then moved his forces to Sayh Harmal and from there ordered an attack on a group of hills called Bir al-Rawiya. The attackers were met with heavy fire from the Portuguese, which threw them into disarray and forced them to withdraw; a second assault met with the same result. Imam Sultan then called off the attack. The Portuguese took advantage of the lull and hastily retreated to their two fortresses, but the Omanis pursued them and laid siege. According to the Omani narrative, the besiegers challenged the garrison to single combat, but no one answered the call. The Portuguese captain, Pereira, had asked to marry the daughter of Narottam, an Indian officer who ran the castle storehouse. Narottam was unhappy with the request and secretly contacted the Imam, who ordered him to spoil the gunpowder store; he complied. While the Portuguese soldiers were busy celebrating Christmas, the Imam launched his attack after the dawn prayer, scaled the walls and began putting the Portuguese and Indians to the sword. One of the fiercest defences was led by a Portuguese officer named Cabreta, who was forced back into the storerooms and killed there by the Omanis. Nearly the whole garrison was wiped out, with only a few managing to escape; the Omanis then advanced on Muttrah, whose garrison surrendered to them.

Portuguese sources state that a number of inhabitants—around 700—arrived at Diu on January 18, 1650, the Omanis suffered between 4,000 and 5,000 deaths in the siege, while the Portuguese garrison was only 60 or 70 alive and later converted to Islam and integrated into the society. The commander of the fort surrendered.

== Aftermath ==
The capture of Muscat marked the end of Portuguese rule in Oman and in the Persian Gulf and had only a small base of Khasab until 1655. On March 16, 1652, a Portuguese fleet was dispatched from Goa to recapture Muscat; however, the expedition ended in failure, and thus Muscat was secured. The victory gave rise to the Omani navy, which would culminate in the capture of Mombasa in 1698.

== Bibliography ==
- Falih Handhal, Arab and Portuguese in History from 711 to 1720.
- Frederick Charles Danvers, The Portuguese In India, Vol. 2.
- Aysha Ali al-Sayyar, The Yarubid State of Oman and East Africa between 1624 and 1741.

== See also ==
- Portuguese Oman
- Capture of Sohar
- Capture of Julfar
- Siege of Mombasa (1696–1698)
