= Capture of Julfar =

1633 battle

- Part of the Omani–Portuguese conflicts
Date	Early 1633
Location	Ras Al Khaimah
Result	Omani victory

Belligerents
Safavid Persia (Kingdom of Portugal) Portuguese Empire	Omani Empire

Commanders and leaders
Nasir al-Din Al-Ajamai	Nasir bin Murshid; Ali bin Ahmad al-Nizawi; Sultan bin Saif; Khamis bin Makhzum

Casualties and losses
A major Persian loss 30–40 Portuguese killed	Unknown

In 1633, the Omanis, led by Nasir bin Murshid attacked the two fortresses at Julfar (modern-day Ras Al Khaimah) one held by Persians and the other by Portuguese. The Omanis successfully captured the two forts.

== Background ==
In 1624, a new imam was elected in Oman called Nasir bin Murshid which led to the foundation of the Ya'rubids. The imam had two objectives: one was to unite Oman into a single country and end the civil wars, the second was to get rid of the Portuguese hegemony that held the coastal cities. However, after the enthronement, many Omani tribes began revolting against him, and he focused his efforts on subduing the rebels, beginning from 1624 to 1630. In late 1632, which was the first contact between the Yarubids and the Portuguese, the ruler of Samail, Mani' bin Sinan, revolted against Nasir alongside the ruler of Bahla, Saif bin Muhammad. Nasir defeated both of them and they fled to Portuguese territory. Mani' went to Muscat, so Nasir prepared an army against him led by Mas'ud bin Ramadan and went to a place called Tuwa al-Rowla close to Muttrah, where he met a Portuguese force and successfully routed them. Mas'ud then marched to Muscat and began bombarding it until the Portuguese asked for a truce, which he accepted, thus saving Muscat from the Omani invasion. Around 1631, the Portuguese built a fort in Ras Al Khaimah.

== Capture ==
The forts of Julfar were the first target for the Omanis. It had two. They were next to each other. One was held by the Persians and the other by the Portuguese. Nasir dispatched two armies to capture them. One was led by Ali bin Ahmad al-Nizawi against the Persian fort, and the other by Sultan bin Saif against the Portuguese. The first attack was launched against the Persians, whose garrison was led by Nasir al-Din Al-Ajamai, a Persian. The Omanis and the Persians fought with each other for two days, and Nasir al-Din almost capitulated. However, the Omanis were met by heavy fire from the Portuguese fort, which caused severe casualties. However, this did not break the Omanis, and another assault was launched, in which they successfully captured the Persian fort. Nasir bin Murshid then ordered Ahmad to stay in Julfar, and an army of the Dehamsha tribe was prepared to assault the Portuguese fort, led by Khamis bin Makhzum. The Omanis captured the fort and killed between 30 and 40 Portuguese, and the rest escaped to Muscat.

== Aftermath ==
Soon after this victory, Nasir dispatched Khamis to the Portuguese fort of Dibba, successfully capturing the fort and the citadel, which surrendered. The Persian loss of Julfar encouraged them to make a compromise with the English over capturing Muscat, but plans fell through in March 1633 when the governor of Shiraz was executed by Shah Safi.

== Bibliography ==
- Falih Handhal, Arab and Portuguese in History from 711 to 1720, p. 507-12
- Frederick Charles Danvers, The Portuguese In India, Vol. 2, p. 244
- Aysha Ali al-Sayyar, The Yarubid State of Oman and East Africa between 1624 and 1741, p. 54-6
- Derek Hopwood, The Arabian Peninsula, Society and Politics

== See also ==
- Portuguese Oman
- Capture of Sohar
- Capture of Muscat (1650)
- Siege of Mombasa (1696–1698)
