= Siege of Sohar (1633–1643) =

- Part of the Omani–Portuguese conflicts
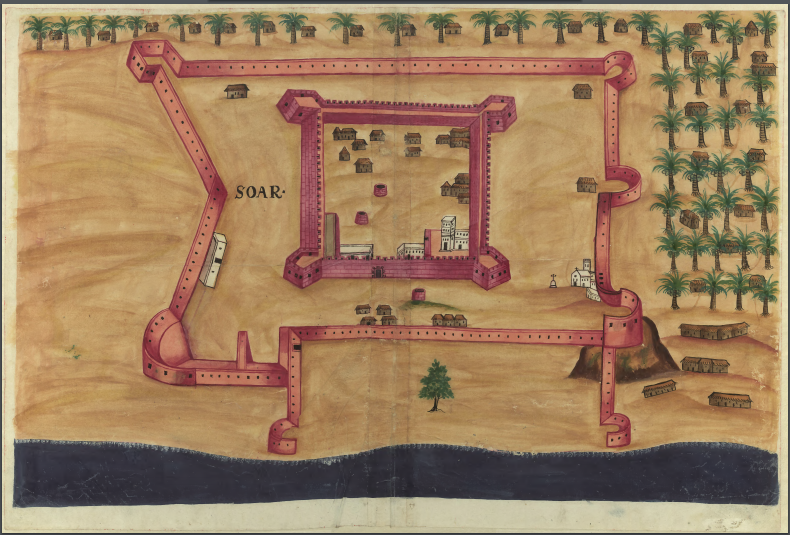
- Portuguese fortress of Sohar
| Date | 8 August 1633 – 7 November 1643 |
| Location | Sohar |
| Result | Omani victory |

Belligerents
| (Kingdom of Portugal) Portuguese Empire | Omani Empire |

Commanders and leaders
| Unknown | Nasir bin Murshid; Hafidh bin Saif; Rashid bin 'Abad † |

Casualties and losses
| Unknown killed 37 captured | Heavy |

In 1633, the Omanis attacked the fortress at Sohar. The Omanis besieged the fortress in 1633 and after a long siege the fort fell in 1643.

== Capture ==
In 1633, after the capture of Julfar and Dibba, Imam Nasir bin Murshid was encouraged by these victories and decided to launch an attack on the fortress of Sohar, which was considered one of the strongest Portuguese fortresses. Imam Nasir's plan was the following: attack the Arabs loyal to the Portuguese; second, construct a fortress close to Sohar so that they can attack and skirmish with the Portuguese garrison. Nasir dispatched his governor of Liwa, Hafidh bin Saif; Haifdh called the Arab tribes of Banu Khlaid, Banu Lam, and 'Amour; they came in a large number of men, alongside support from the people of Sohar. The Omanis arrived in Sohar on August 8, 1633. The Portuguese were alarmed by this attack and began exchanging fire with the Omanis. The Omanis fiercely attacked the walls however they were met by heavy artillery fire which forced the Omanis to retreat little back one of the commanders, Rashid bin 'Abad was killed in the assault, nevertheless, the Omanis succeeded in building their fortress, Hafidh bin Said then ordered the Omanis to take their positions in the fort and the Omanis kept an eye on the Portuguese fort who was blockaded from land, however the Omanis didn't have enough force to besiege them from sea allowing supplies to flow in the fort, thus putting the siege into a stalemate, the situation changed on November 7, 1643, when Imam Nasir had arrived to Sohar after a failed siege of Muscat, the Omanis assaulted the fort and captured it, killing its guards and capturing 37 prisoners.

== See also ==
- Portuguese Oman
- Capture of Julfar
- Capture of Muscat (1650)
- Siege of Mombasa (1696–1698)
