= Al-Salt bin Malik =

Al-Salt bin Malik الصلت بن مالك
- Imam

Imam of Oman
- Reign: 15 October 851 – 22 April 885
- Predecessor: Al-Muhanna bin Jayfar
- Successor: Rashid bin al-Nadhar
Names
- Al-Salt bin Malik al-Kharusi al-Yahmadi الصلت بن مالك الخروصي اليحمدي
- Clan: Yahmad
- Religion: Ibadi Islam

Al-Salt bin Malik (Arabic: الصلت بن مالك, romanized: Al-Ṣalt bin Mālik) was the seventh Imam of Oman, ruling from 851 until his deposition in 885.

== Reign ==
Except for the fact he was a Kharusi hailing from the Yahmad branch of Azd, little is known about al-Salt bin Malik's life prior to his election as imam. He was elected by the Ibadi ulama on the same day as the death of his predecessor, al-Muthanna bin Jayfar, in 851. During his reign, he dispatched an armada of over one-hundred ships, supposedly at the request of the female poet Fatima al-Suqutriyya, to successfully retake Socotra, which had been occupied by the Ethiopians. A proclamation to the Omani army attributed to al-Salt ibn Malik details Ibadi military jurisprudence and the treatment of Muslims and non-Muslims. In addition, a fortification was constructed at the site of Nizwa Fort.

=== Deposition ===
The latter years of al-Salt bin Malik's reign saw a rise in discontent from tribal sheikhs, possibly due to his less tribal attitude to governance compared to his predecessors. The opposition was headed by a certain Musa bin Musa, who, with his supporters, marched on al-Salt bin Malik's army headquarters near Nizwa with the intent of presenting their demands and forcibly removing him from power if needed. Too weak to resist, al-Salt bin Malik left for his son's house on 3 Dhu al-Hijjah 271 AH (22 April 885 AD). Musa then installed Rashid bin al-Nadhar as imam.

== Legacy ==
The deposition of al-Salt bin Malik sparked conflict between the Qahtanite and Adnanite tribes of Oman, culminating in a civil war which ended with an invasion led by Muhammad ibn Nur reestablishing Abbasid rule over the region and the dissolution of the first Ibadi imamate.

A schism developed amongst Ibadi scholars concerning how al-Salt bin Malik's deposers should be considered: the Nizwa school suspended judgement, whereas the Rustaq school held they were apostates. In 1052 CE, Imam Rashid bin Said's support for the Rustaq school induced the Ibadis of Hadhramaut to form a breakaway imamate under the leadership of Abu Ishaq Ibrahim bin Qays al-Hadrami.
