= Al-Muhanna bin Jayfar =

Al-Muhanna bin Jayfar المهنا بن جيفر
- Imam

Imam of Oman
- Reign: 29 April 840 – 15 October 851
- Predecessor: Abd al-Malik bin Humayd
- Successor: Al-Salt bin Malik
- Died: 15 October 851
Names
- Al-Muhannā bin Jayfar al-Yaḥmadī al-Fajḥī
- Clan: Yahmad
- Religion: Ibadi Islam

Al-Muhanna bin Jayfar (Arabic: المهنا بن جيفر, romanized: al-Muhannā bin Jayfar) was an Ibadi scholar who was elected as the sixth imam of the Imamate of Oman, ruling from April 841 until his death in October 851. His rule saw economic growth, continuing development of Ibadi theology and the reorganisation of the military. Although opposition grew to his attempts to strengthen the imam's authority, he refused to leave power and swiftly dealt with challenges to his rule.

== Biography ==
Al-Muhanna bin Jayfar was elected as imam by the Ibadi ulama on 29 April 840/3 Rajab 226 AH, the same day as the death of his predecessor Abd al-Malik bin Humayd. He hailed from the Yahmad clan of Azd and may have a relative of the fourth imam, Ghassan bin Abdullah. His tendency to expose his teeth when angered earned him the nickname 'Dhū ’l-Nāb' (possessor of the eyetooth).

Al-Muhanna possessed a stern disposition, and his reign was characterised by increasingly centralised governance and strict disciplinary measures, especially towards his critics and those deemed to be a threat to the imamate. His desire to maintain order led him to reorganise the military: the navy expanded to 300 warships, and the irregular militias known as the shurat were replaced with a standing army headquartered at Nizwa, comprised from 10,000 soldiers and up to 9,000 horses and camels. In addition, agricultural output was improved due to works undertaken on the aflaj irrigation systems. The relative stability throughout his reign increased commerce and fostered population growth, with one district of Nizwa housing up to 14,000 inhabitants during his rule.

=== Opposition ===
Al-Muthanna's disregard for the traditional power structure of the imamate, where power was shared with the ulama, earned him opposition from their ranks. His approach to governance alienated the prominent scholars Bashir bin al-Mundhir and Muhammad bin Mahbub, who secretly renounced him. Several such malcontents convinced Musa bin Ali, the most influential scholar on the ahl al-hall wal-aqd, to dismiss al-Muhanna from office. Although Musa met with al-Muhanna intending to remove him from power, the latter refused and told him that no imam would rule for more than a year if popular opinion reigned supreme.

Sometime during al-Muhanna's rule, the tribes of Mahrah refused to continue paying the zakat tax to the imamate. When a Mahri individual named Wasim bin Jayfar refused to pay his due and threatened one of al-Muhanna's tax collectors, he dispatched three armed units under the command of the governors of Sinaw, Adam and Ja'lan to take the Mahri chief captive. During this expedition, Wasim was captured and imprisoned in Nizwa. He remained there for one year until Mahri sheikhs secured his release through the intercession of al-Muthanna's clan, Yahmad. Al-Muhanna offered Wasim's release in exchange for the tribes bringing camels to Nizwa annually, which they agreed to.

The most serious challenge to al-Muthanna's power was posed by the tribe of Banu al-Julanda, who held power in Oman until 702. Led by a certain al-Mughirah bin Raswan, Julandani rebels marched on Tawam where they defeated and killed the local governor, Abu al-Waddah. In response, al-Muthanna dispatched two armies to the region, one led by Abu Marwan, the governor of Sohar. His force included an Indian component whose chief was al-Mattar al-Hindi, although it is unclear whether they were mercenaries or professional soldiers. The armies scored decisive victories over the Julandanis and carried out a series of reprisals allegedly under the influence of al-Mattar's men: the Banu al-Julanda were massacred, their settlements razed and families forced to starve in the desert. Al-Muhanna later described their conduct as 'foolish' and recompensed those who had lost their homes.

=== Development of Ibadi theology ===
The controversy of Quranic createdness reached Oman during al-Muhanna's rule and became a source of contention within the Ibadi community. A debate took place between Ibadi scholars Muhammad bin Mahbub and Muhammad bin Hisham on the subject; the former argued that the Quran was created by Allah, while the latter argued against the doctrine and threatened to leave Oman if it continued to spread. Ibadi scholars convened to discuss the issue, and by the end of the meeting Muhammad bin Mahbub retracted his views on the matter. Fearful of a schism within the Ibadi community, the scholars requested al-Muhanna to forbid anyone from saying that Quran was created, to which he complied.

Al-Muhanna himself was active in clarifying and developing Ibadi doctrine. A siyar he authored, addressed to a certain Mu'adh bin Harb, expresses his views on issues of Ibadi theology and fiqh, including predestination, the shortening of prayers when travelling and the rejection of anthropomorphic views of God. In his discussion of predestination, he states that destiny and human actions originate from God's knowledge, predicated on the view that God's knowledge and determination of human actions are inseparable. In addition, he equates sin to disbelief (kufr), classifying it into two categories: disbelief through the rejection of revelation, and disbelief in the revelation through disobedience to it.

=== Death and legacy ===
Al-Muhanna died on 15 October 851/16 Rabi al-Thani 237 AH. He was succeeded as imam by Al-Salt bin Malik on the same day. In July 2017, a mosque named after al-Muhanna was opened in Oman's Barka wilayah.

== Sources ==
- al-Rawas, Isam Ali Ahmad (1990) Early Islamic Oman (ca - 622/280-893) : a political history. Doctoral thesis, Durham University.
- Al-Salmi, Abdulrahman (2001) The Omani siyar as a literary genre and its role in the political evolution and doctrinal development of Eastern Ibadism, with special reference to the epistles of Khwarizm, Khurasan and Mansura. Doctoral thesis, Durham University.
- Hoffman, V. J. (2012). The essentials of Ibadi Islam. Syracuse, N.Y: Syracuse University Press.
