= Ibadi siyar =

Ibadi Islamic texts

Several Omani/Ibadi manuscripts discovered over the past four decades, particularly in the Sultanate of Oman and North Africa, contain the texts of what is commonly termed “sirah” (“history”) or “jam’ al siyar” (“collection of histories”). They belong to a familiar type of literature, a genre used when addressing the general public in mosques in the early Islamic era (1st and 2nd /7th and 8th) centuries.

Most of the siyar convey the viewpoint of the school and consist of homilies, epistles, addressed to the fellowship of the believers. These epistles are read out aloud by the preacher, setting out what ought or ought not to be believed, as well as those deeds that ought or ought not to be done. The exhortations at the beginning of the siyar are relatively long and reflect the social context of their time. The siyar that have so far been reviewed and edited are from what is referred to as the “Basra period”; most of them were written in Iraq, while some of the others were produced during the “regional period” – i.e. “abroad”.

== Omani siyar ==
The actual texts of the siyar are generally to be found in Omani manuscripts, though there are also some in North Africa, while some have been recopied in East Africa (Zanzibar), either in their entirety or as excerpts. Many of these texts appear in fiqh (jurisprudence) encyclopaedias such as Bayan al Shar‘ by Muhammad b. Ibrahim al-Kindi (d. 508/1115) and the al-Musannaf by Abu Bakr al Kindi (d. 557/1126). Later, they appeared in volumes with titles like “Al Siyar al ‘Umaniyyah” (“Omani Siyar”) or “Al Ibadiyyah” (“Ibadism”).

All the siyar works that have been obtained in manuscript form, were written in Oman during the Ya‘rubi era (1624-1741). They were then copied and reissued in other collections, with each copier choosing those bits that he considered appropriate for his own book or collection. This continued to be the case until relatively recently. That is why there are discrepancies between the numbers and types of different siyar, as well as in the order in which they are arranged and classified.

== Scholarly works and Ibadi siyar ==
Scholars began to take a particular interest in these siyar from the beginning of 1980. There were two main reasons for this: first, they were a reliable source of information about events during the early Islamic period. Second, they contained information from an Ibadi angle about the politics and beliefs during Islam’s “formative period”. Their distinctive rhetorical style meant that they were different from other Arabic literature of the time and made them attractive as sources of information and historical content throughout the ensuing ages.

Michael Cook has edited and published a number of old Ibadi texts under the title Early Muslim Dogma. Other works on the subject include The Epistle of Salim Ibn Dhakwan by Patricia Crone and Fritz Zimmermann (2001), and fourteen texts recently edited by Wilfred Madelung and Abdulrahman al-Salimi.

== Content of the Ibadi siyar ==
These siyar include a wide range of material: theological questions that were debated in early Islamic circles, political issues from an Ibadi community perspective. The documented texts allow the researcher to make a detailed analysis of early Ibadi beliefs within the broader context of the contemporary Islamic discourse.
