= Fatima al-Suqutriyya =

Yemeni writer and poet

Fāṭima bint Aḥmad Muḥammad al-Jahḍamī (Arabic: فاطمة بنت أحمد محمد الجهضمي), known as Fāṭima al-Suqutriyya (Arabic: فاطمة السقطرية, Fatima the Socotran) and nicknamed al-Zahra on the model of the Prophet's daughter Fāṭima, for whom al-Zahra ('the shining one') was a popular epithet, was a Yemeni writer and poet who lived on the island of Socotra in the third century AH (816–913 CE). (Note: The principal scholarly accounts of al-Suqutriyya are found in Nūr al-Dīn ʿAbd Allāh bin Ḥumayd wal-Sālimī, Tuḥfat al-Aʿyān bi-sīrat ahl ʿUmān, 2 vols (Cairo: Matba‘at al-sufliyya, 1347/1928), p. 112 and Sālim ibn Ḥumūd, ʿUmān ʿabr al-tārīkh (Muscat, 1982), II, 191, cited by Isam Ali Ahmad al-Rawas, 'Early Islamic Oman (ca - 622/280-893): A Political History' (unpublished Ph.D. thesis, University of Durham, 1990), p. 273. See also R. B. Serjeant, 'The Coastal Population of Socotra', in Socotra: Island of Tranquility, ed. by Brian Doe (London: IMMEL Publishing, 1992), pp. 133–80 (pp. 136-40) (repr. in R. B. Serjeant, Society and Trade in South Arabia (Aldershot: Variorum, 1996), ch XVII) and J. C. Wilkinson, The Imamate Tradition of Oman (Cambridge: Cambridge University Press, 1987), pp. 332, 344.) She is thought to be the first known Socotran poet.

== Biography ==
Little is actually known about al-Suqutriyya. She is thought to have been born on the island of Socotra, during the third century AH. She was a poet and was related to Sultan al-Qāsim bin Muḥammad al-Jahḍamī, the ruler of the Yemeni island of Socotra. He was killed by Ethiopians who attacked the island. Al-Suqutriyya reputedly wrote a qasida to Imam al-Ṣalt ibn Mа̄lik, who had assumed the imamate of Oman in 273 AH / 886 CE, requesting help from him. The poem was sent by sea and found by a fisherman who passed it on to the imam. The Imam sent a fleet of one hundred boats to Socotra, defeating the Ethiopian force on Socotra.

Al-Suqutriyya died some time after the year 273 AH / 886 CE.

== Work ==
Al-Suqutriyya is known for the long poem attributed to her, addressed to al-Ṣalt ibn Mа̄lik. The opening of the poem runs

قل للإمام الذي ترجى فضائلُـه\\ابن الكرام وابن السَّادة النجبِ
وابن الجحاجحة الشمِّ الذين همُ\\كانوا سناها وكانوا سادة العربِ
أمست (سقطرى) من الإسلام مقفرةً\\بعد الشرائع والفرقان والكتبِ
واستبدلت بالهدى كفرًا ومعصيةً\\وبالأذان نواقيسًا من الخشـبِ

Translation:

Tell the imam whose virtues are to be hoped for, the son of the noble and distinguished Sayyids,
The son of the gentlemen who were its light and the best of the Arabs:
Socotra has become empty of Islam after [it was full of] Islamic law, the Qur'an, and the books [of faith].
It has replaced the right guidance with disbelief and sin, and the call to prayer with wooden bells.

== Reception ==
Al-Suqutriyya is considered a lost voice in Omani literature, whose work was re-discovered in the twentieth century. In the assessment of Serge D. Elie, her poem

seems to be the first act of writing—or more aptly, discursive insurrection—attributed to a Soqotran, and as such it is the source of pride among Soqotrans. However, as this poem became part of popular ‘historiology’—that peculiar combination of orality and literacy, resulting into a synthesis of fact and fiction—the incident was believed to have taken place during the time of the Portuguese, and through a process of osmosis (as literacy remains a problem) has permeated the culture and shaped collective memory.

Al-Suqutriyya's story and her poetry featured in an episode of "History and Heritage (Omani Personalities Immortalized by History)" presented by Dr. Hamid Al-Nawfali for Al-Ru'ya TV. This programme became controversial when it was aired in Socotra, because it claimed that Al-Suqutriyya was from Oman. A resident of the island, Abdul Karim Qabalan, called on the television company to apologise. In 2016, the novelist Munir Talal published a retelling of the poem.
