= Muhammad ibn Nur =

Muhammad ibn Nur (Arabic: محمد بن نور) (also known as ibn Thawr or ibn Thur; pejoratively referred to as ibn Bur) was the governor of al-Bahrain for the Abbasid Empire in the last decade of the ninth century. He is known for his invasion and conquest of Oman, resulting in the resumption of Abbasid rule there.

== Campaign in Oman ==
No details of Muhammad's life are known outside of his conquest of Oman. In 892, in the midst of the civil war raging within the Ibadi Imamate of Oman, he received a delegation from one of the factions fighting in the conflict, asking for him to intervene on their behalf. Muhammad suggested that they forward their request to the caliph al-Mu'tadid, who agreed that an expedition should be undertaken. Muhammad accordingly raised a large army for the campaign, and soon he reportedly had some 25,000 men under his command. The bulk of his forces then departed from al-Bahrain, taking the land route to Oman, while a second division carrying a large amount of supplies set sail from al-Basra toward Julfar.

The reaction in Oman to the news of Muhammad's advance was one of panic; many of the imam 'Azzan ibn Tamim's supporters in Nizwa abandoned him, while a large number of the residents of Suhar fled the country for Abbasid and Saffarid territory. Muhammad's forces soon arrived at Julfar and were able to take it after a short battle. They then advanced further into the country, arriving at Tu'am in April 893, followed by al-Sirr and finally Nizwa. Having captured Nizwa without resistance, Muhammad moved on to a village where the imam and his troops were stationed. The resulting battle, which took place in mid-May, ended in victory for the Abbasids; the imam and many of his followers were killed and their heads were sent in triumph to the caliph in Baghdad.

The death of the imam did not immediately bring an end to the war, and within a short time a number of Omani tribes had formed an alliance with the objective of expelling Muhammad from the country. According to Ibadi sources, the alliance caught up with Muhammad at Dama and initially gained the upper hand against his forces. The tide turned, however, when Muhammad's army was bolstered by the arrival of tribal reinforcements; the alliance was completely defeated and many of its fighters were killed. After that the organized resistance against Muhammad collapsed and he returned to Nizwa as the undisputed master of Oman.

Muhammad remained in Oman for some years after its conquest. As ruler of the country, he took several repressive measures against the populace. The sources record that the Omani people were dealt with harshly, and many were tortured, mutilated or killed. Ibadi teachings were discouraged and numerous books were burned. He even went so far as to destroy the centuries-old water channel system that was used for irrigation. Muhammad's actions are reported to have brought devastation to the country, and as a result he was disparagingly given the name ibn Bur ("wasteland") by Omani sources.

Muhammad returned to al-Bahrain in 896, appointing Ahmad ibn Hilal as his deputy governor in Oman.
