= Siyar =

Branch of Islamic law

Siyar is the plural of the noun sira, and literally means a “path”, or “way of walking”. In the singular, sira is used by chroniclers to account to one's life or biography, most specifically to the conduct of an individual. In Islamic traditions, it is a discipline of the Islamic law which covers issues of law of war and international relations, describing Muslim states in relation with communities of believers and nonbelievers alike.

The word siyar dates originally from the late Umayyad period when the term had the connotation of “position of the school or sect” or “opinion” on a creedal or political question. This genre was well known among the Islamic groups who rebelled against the Umayyads such as the Muhakkimah, Zaydis, Murji’ites and Ibadis.

Most of the siyar convey the viewpoint of the school and consist of homilies, epistles, addressed to the fellowship of the believers. These epistles are read out aloud by the preacher, setting out what ought or ought not to be believed, as well as those deeds that ought or ought not to be done. The exhortations at the beginning of the siyar are relatively long and reflect the social context of their time. The siyar that have so far been reviewed and edited are from what is referred to as the “Basra period”; most of them were written in Iraq, while some of the others were produced during the “regional period” – i.e. “abroad”.
