= Nizwa Fort =

17th century fortress in Oman

Coordinates: 22°56′00″N 57°31′49″E

- قلعة نزوى
- Nizwa, Oman
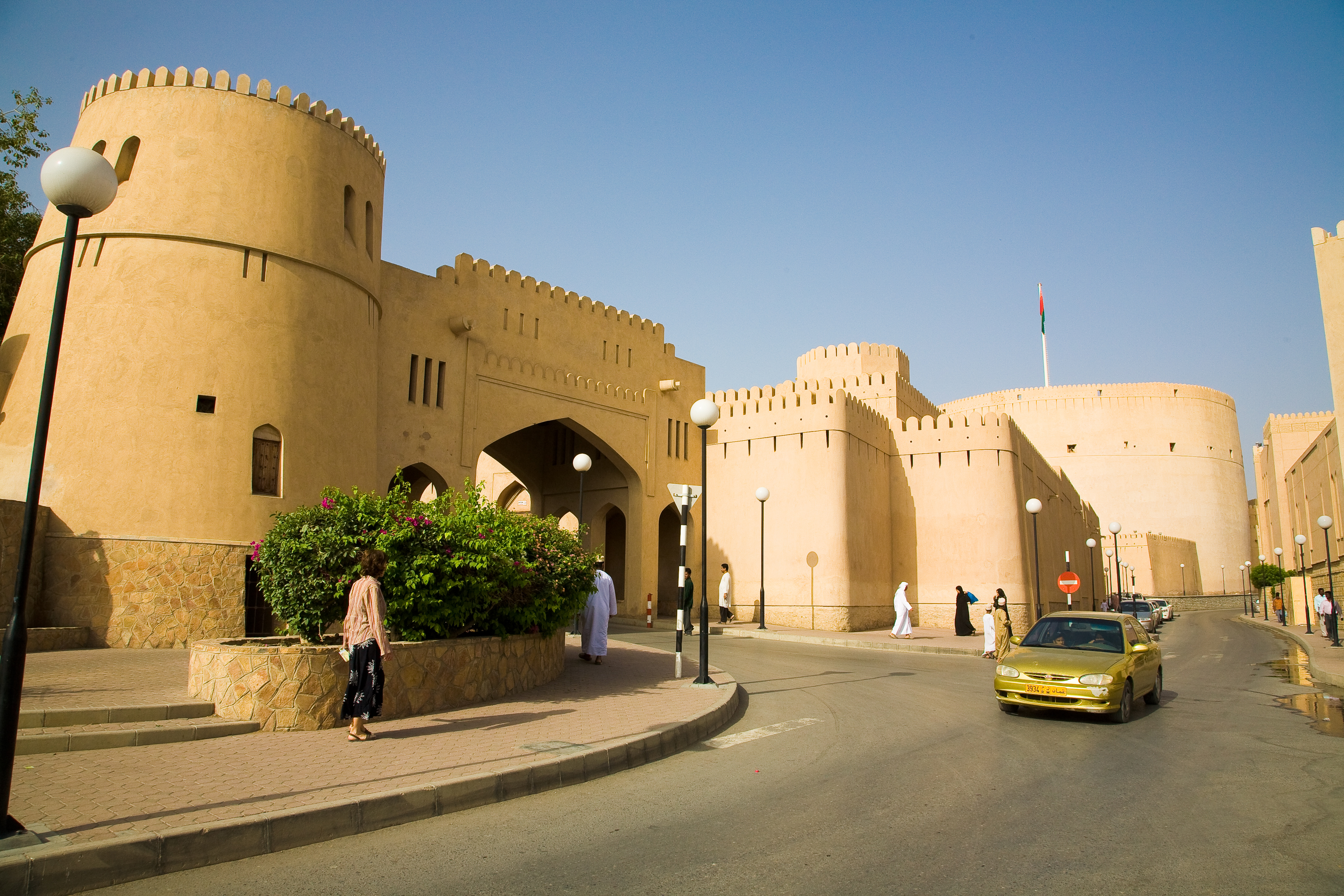
- The fort of Nizwa

Site information
- Type: Fortification
- Open to the public: Yes

Site history
- Built: 1650s
- Built by: Sultan bin Saif

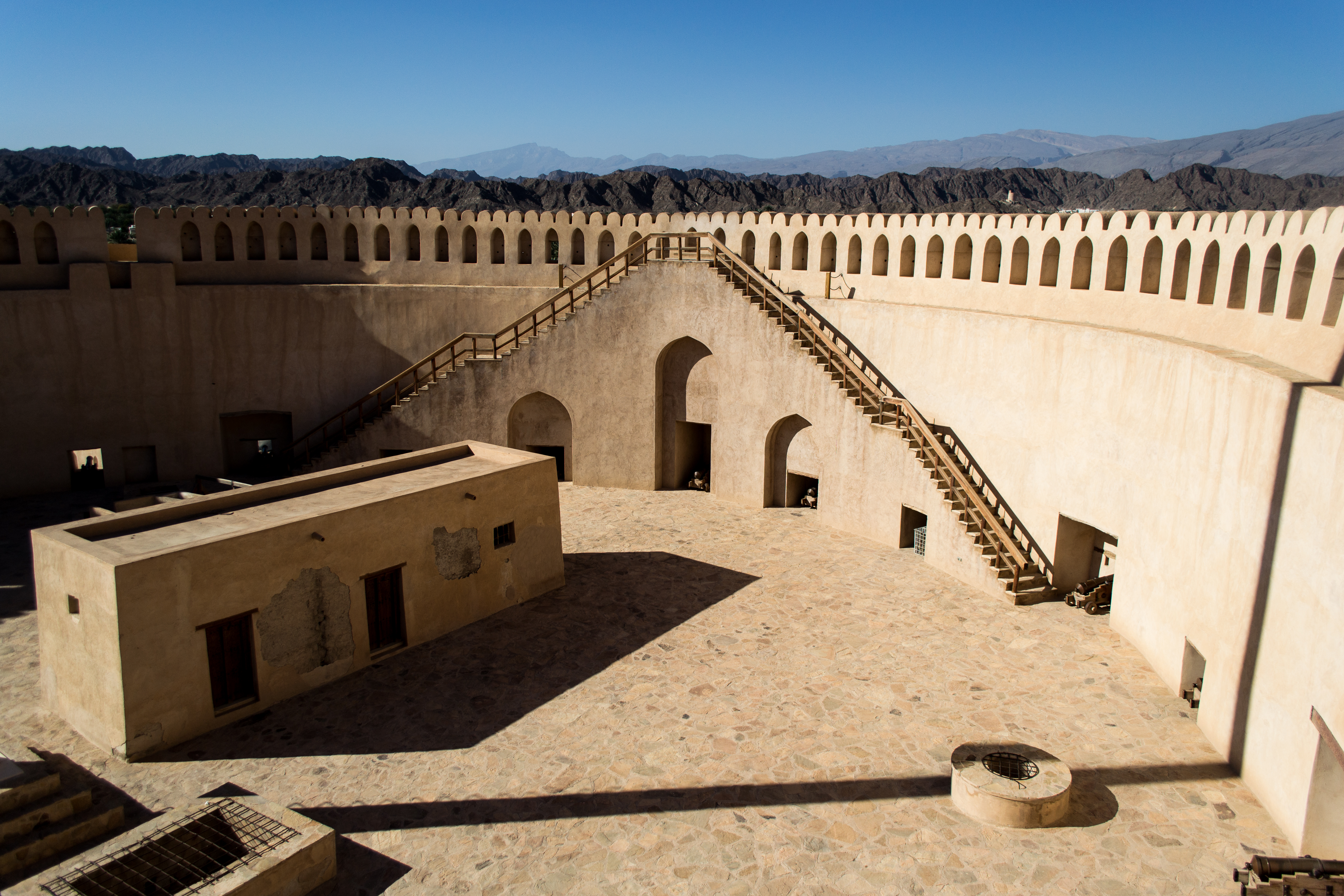
View from Inside the Fort

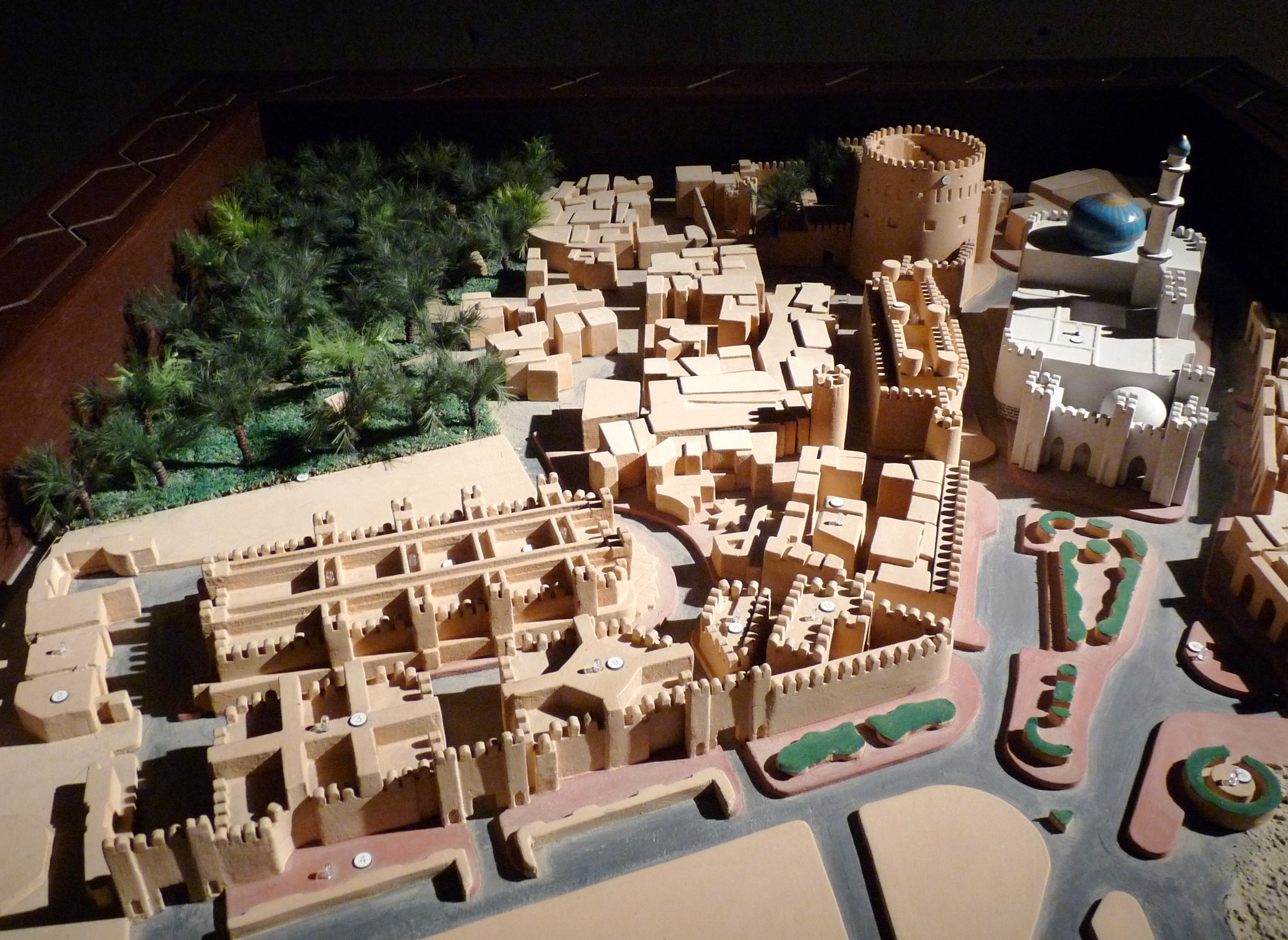
Miniature model of the fort detailing the layout

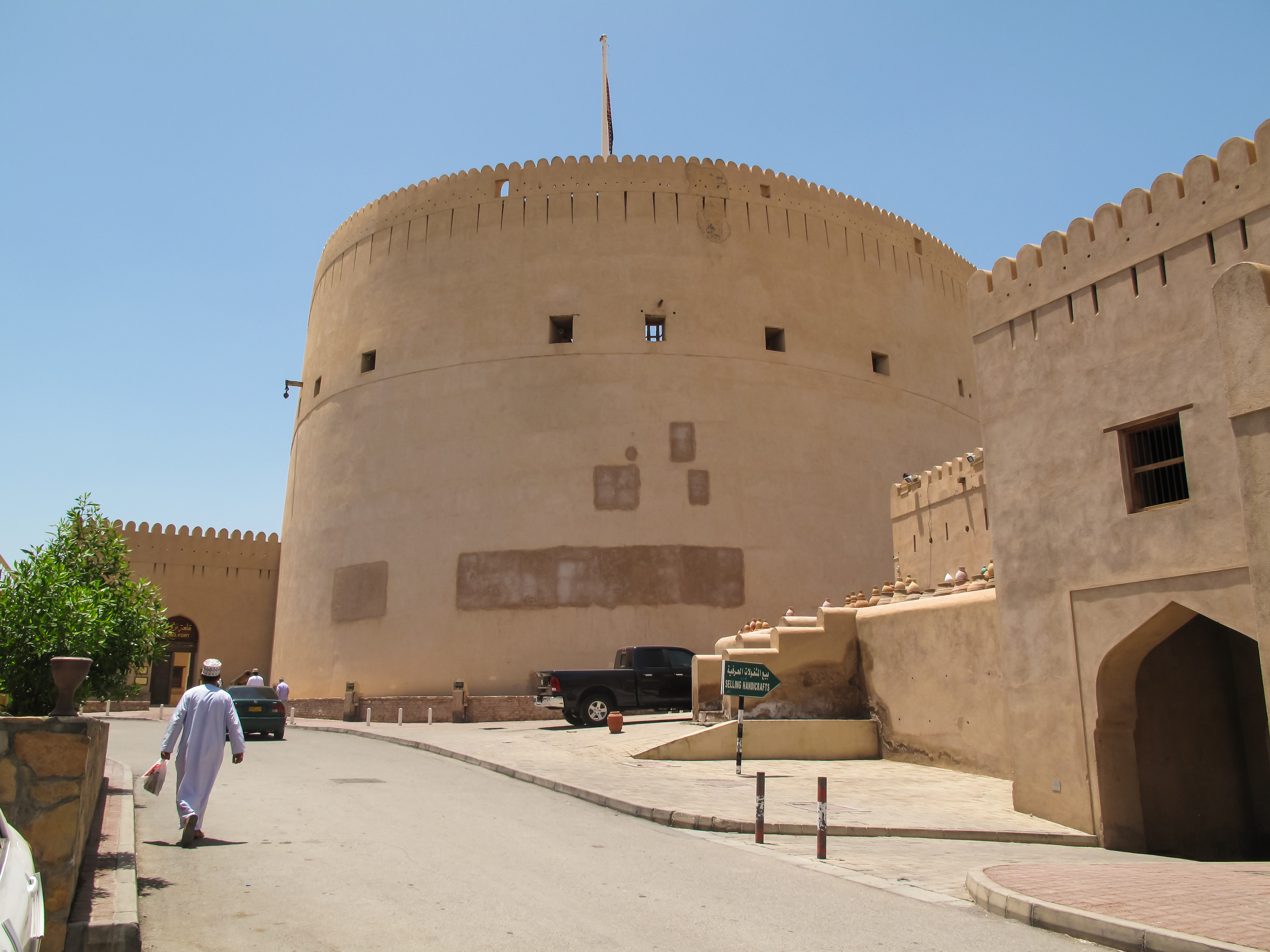
The main tower

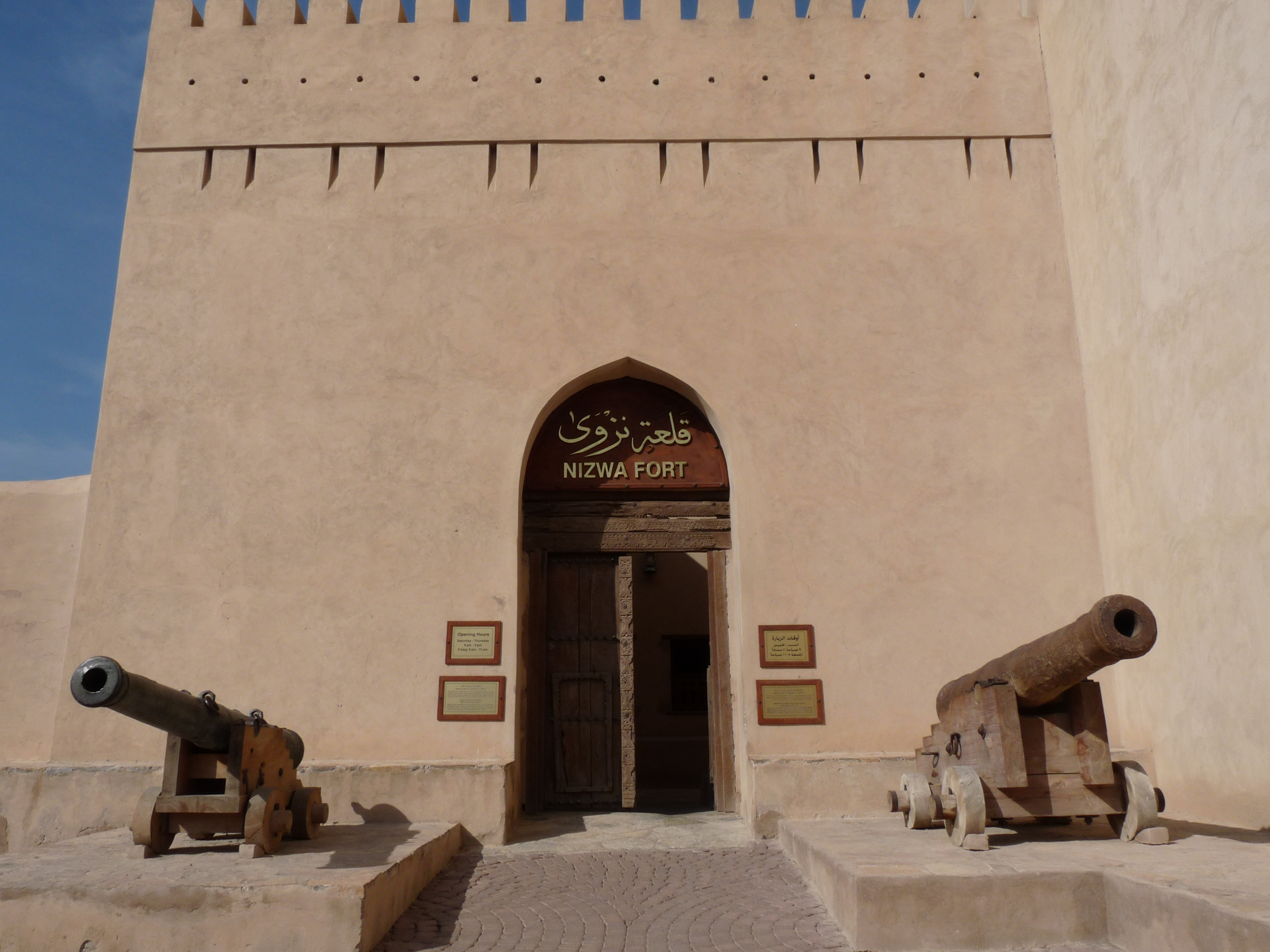
Cannons at one of the gates

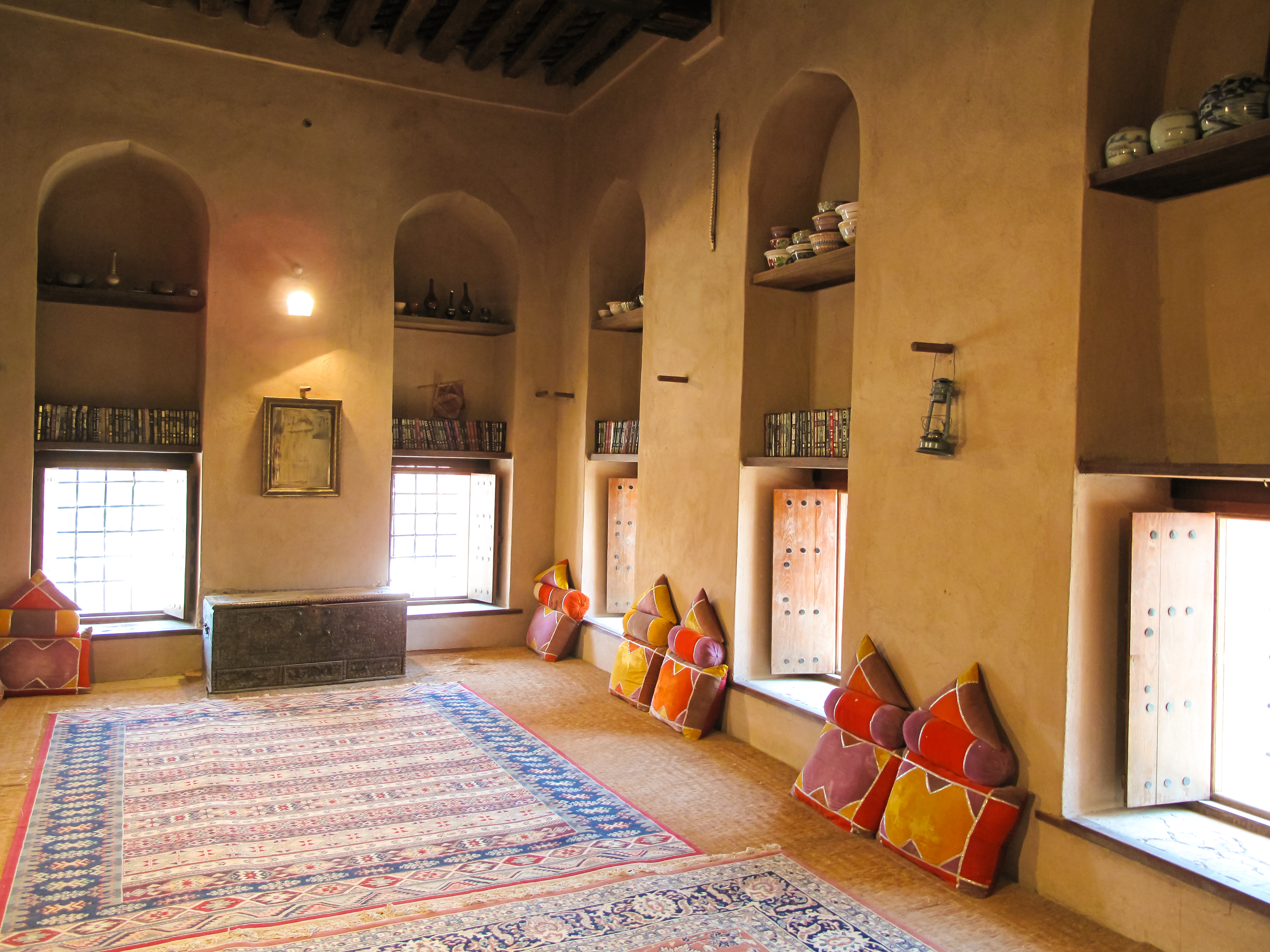
Library inside the fort

The Nizwa Fort (Arabic: قلعة نزوى) is a 17th-century fortification in Nizwa, Oman. Built in the 1650s under Imam Sultan bin Saif, it is known for its large circular tower and is one of Oman's prominent historic and tourist landmarks.

== History ==
It was built in the 1650s by the second Ya’rubi; Imam Sultan Bin Saif Al Ya'rubi, although its underlying structure goes back to the 12th century. It is Oman's most visited national monument. The fort was the administrative seat of authority for the presiding Imams and Walis in times of peace and conflict. The main bulk of the fort took about 12 years to complete and was built above an underground stream. The fort is a powerful reminder of the town's significance through turbulent periods in Oman's long history. It was a formidable stronghold against raiding forces that desired Nizwa's abundant natural wealth and its strategic location at the crossroads of vital routes.

== Layout ==
The fort's design reflects the Omani architectural ingenuity in the Ya’rubi era that witnessed considerable advancement in military fortifications and the introduction of mortar-based warfare. The main part of the fort is its enormous drum-like tower that rises 30 metres above the ground and has a diameter of 36 metres. The strong foundations of the fort go 30 metres into the ground, and a portion of the tower is filled with rocks, dirt and rubble. The doors are inches deep and the walls are rounded and robust, designed to withstand fierce barrages of mortar fire. There are 24 openings all around the top of the tower for mortar fire.

Two cannons guard the entrance to the fort which opens into a maze of rooms, high-ceilinged halls, doorways, terraces, narrow staircases and corridors. Four cannons remain on the tower's top, down from a total of 24, which once served as the fort’s main firepower. They provided complete 360-degree coverage of the countryside around making it virtually impossible for a surprise attack on the fort without provoking a reply from the cannons. One of them has the name of Imam Sultan bin Saif engraved on it. Another, from Boston City, was presented to the first Omani ambassador to the United States in 1840. Clumps of cannonballs, misshapen with rust and age lie around.

The design of the tower, complete with battlements, turret, secret shafts, false doors and wells incorporates a great deal of architectural deception. Access to the top is only by means of a narrow twisty staircase barred by a heavy wooden door studded with metal spikes to exhaust the enemy and impede their progress to the top of the tower. Those who did manage to run the gauntlet of hurdles risked being burnt by boiling oil or water that was poured through shafts which opened directly above each set of doors and which are called murder holes. Date syrup, a liquid that oozed from bags of dates stored in special date cellars, also came in handy as an alternative to oil and water. The fort was built above a subterranean stream that ensured a permanent supply of water when subjected to a prolonged siege. Several cisterns located within the fortified compound also ensured plentiful supplies. Underground cellars stockpiled food and munitions. Running all round the summit of the tower is a wall for use by 120 guards who kept watch over the surrounding countryside and were armed with muskets and flintlocks. Furthermore, 480 gun-ports allowed for a concentrated barrage of fire if the fort came under attack.

There are around 6 pitfalls to catch enemies off guard in the dark passageway. Some of the stairs has wooden planks that could be removed to expose deep, gaping pits which were certain to put an end to anyone unfortunate enough to fall into them.

== Tourism ==
Nizwa Fort is a major heritage attraction in the Ad Dakhiliyah Governorate and is often visited as part of Nizwa's historic centre, near the city's traditional souq. The official Oman tourism portal describes the fort as one of the country's most prominent tourist destinations and highlights its distinctive circular tower, which rises 34 metres and has a diameter of 45 metres.

== See also ==
- Bahla Fort
- Jabrin
