= Portuguese Oman =

Historical period

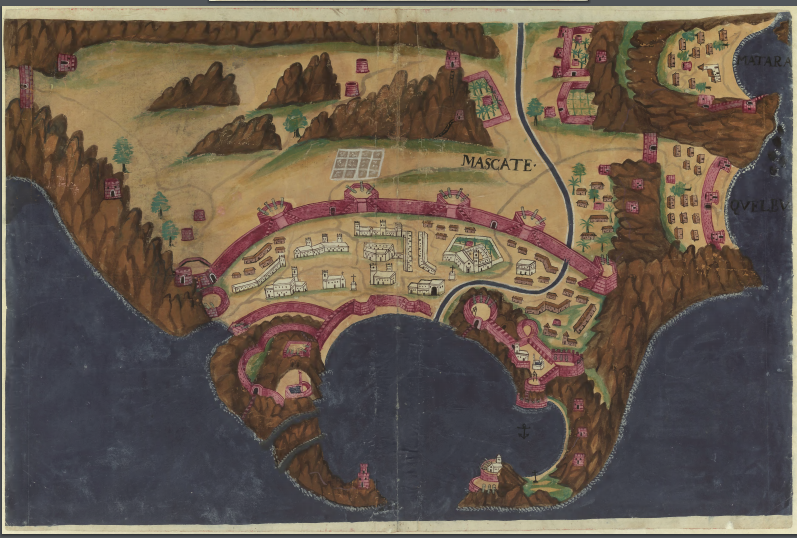
Portuguese depiction of Muscat by António Bocarro

Portuguese Oman refers to the period during which the northern coastal cities of Oman were under Portuguese rule, between 1507 and 1656.

The coastal region was conquered by Portuguese forces under the command of Afonso de Albuquerque in 1507, and remained under Portuguese control until they were expelled by the Ya'rubids.

== History ==
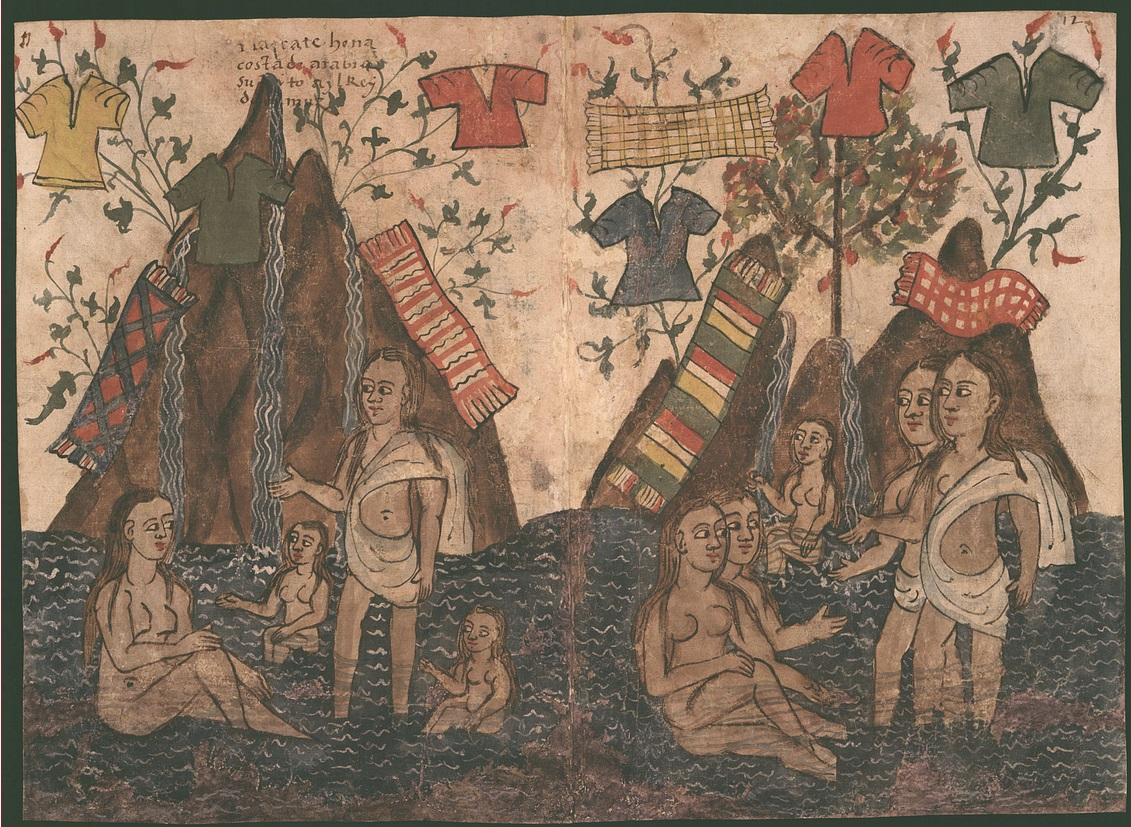
16th century Portuguese depiction of a bathing scene at Muscat, in the Códice Casanatense

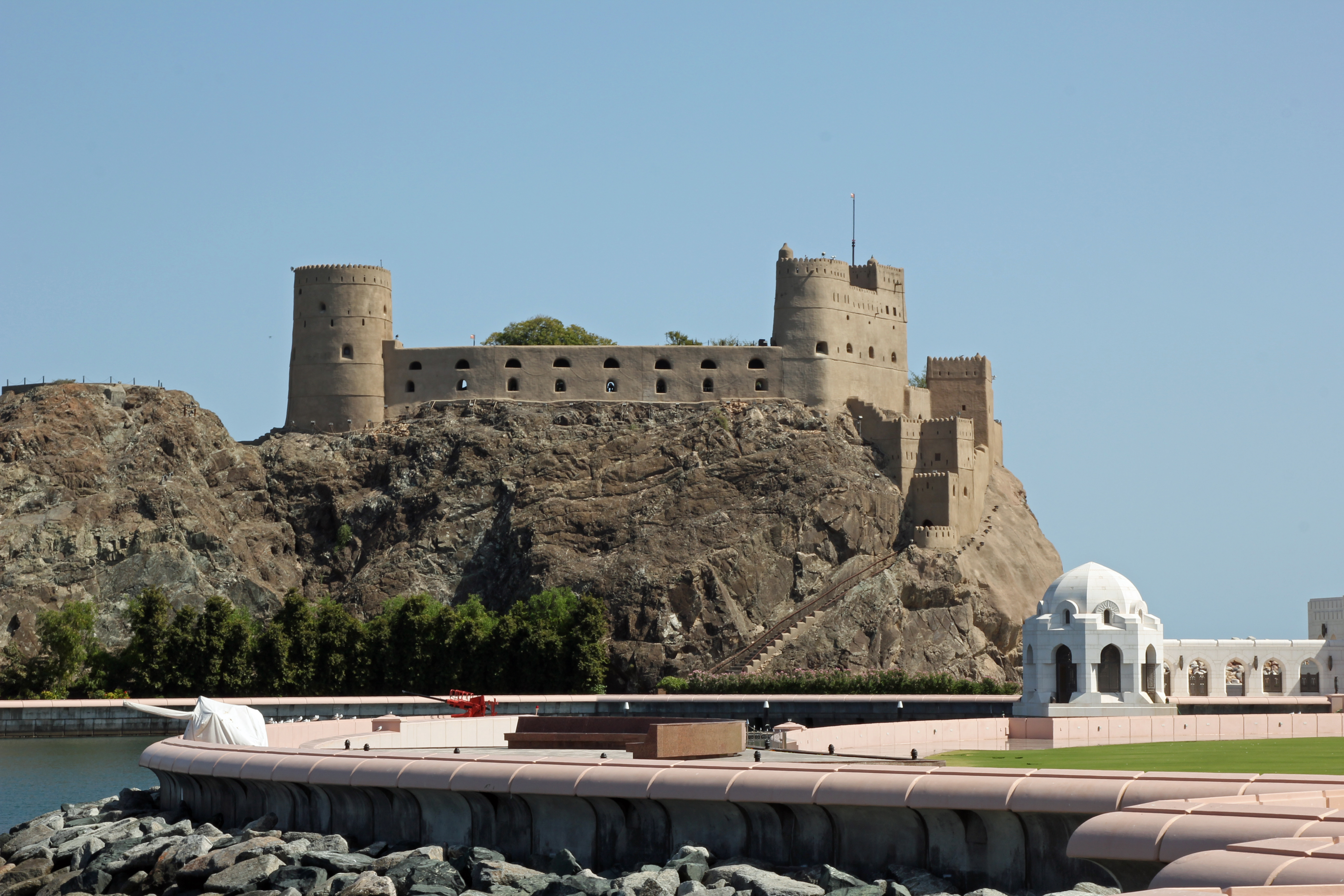
Al Jalali Fort at Muscat

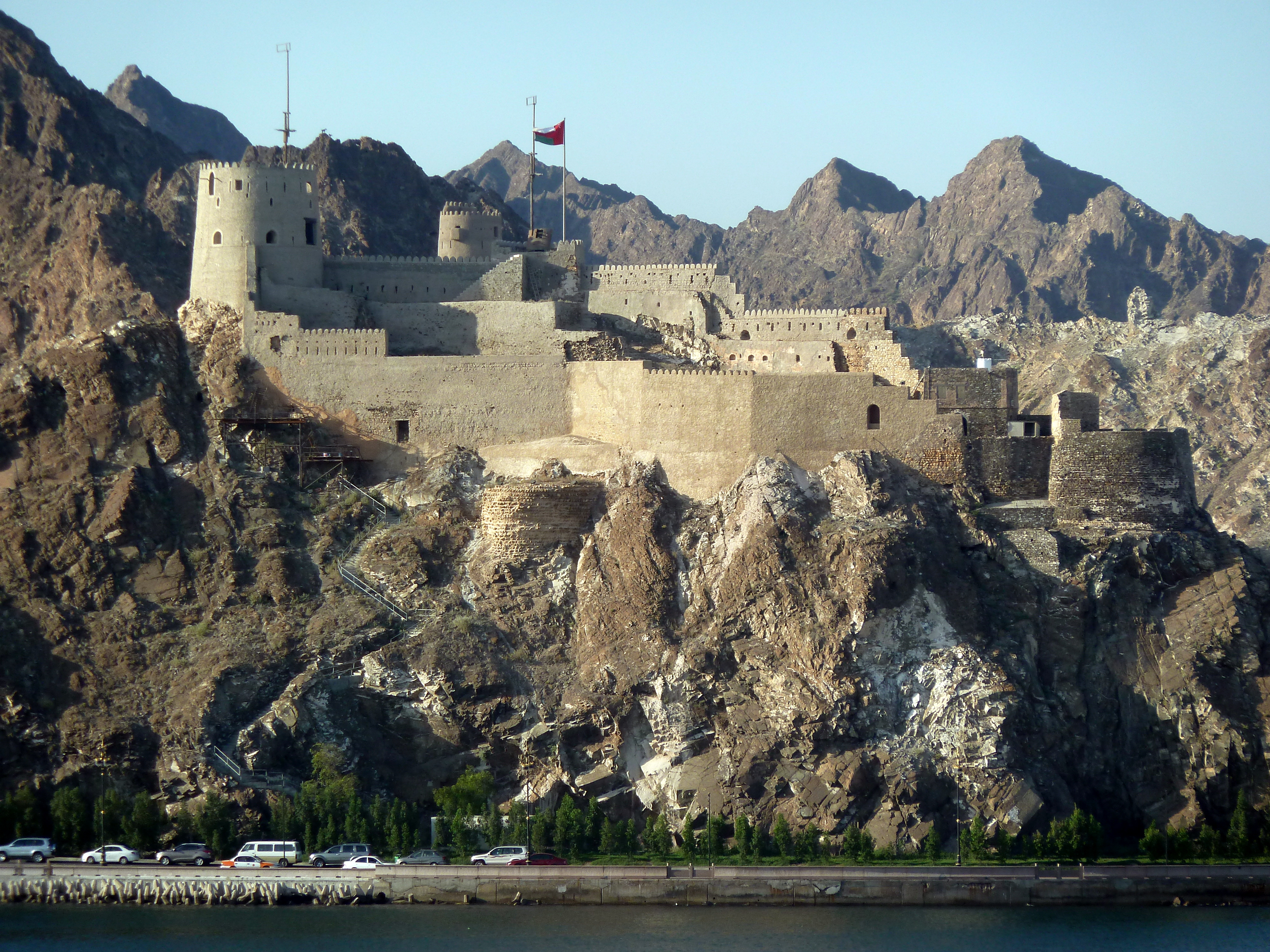
Al Mirani Fort at Muscat

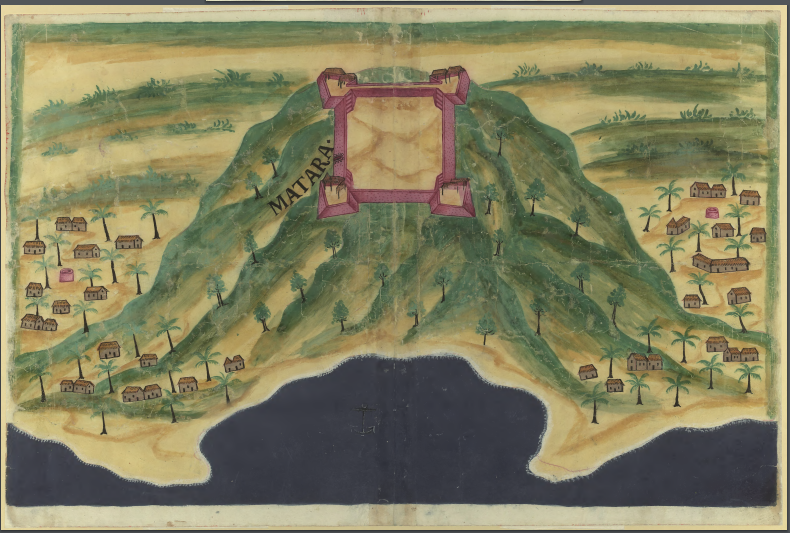
Fort of Matara as depicted by António Bocarro

In the early 16th century, the northern coast of Oman was a province of the Kingdom of Hormuz, ruled by its governors.

In 1507, the Portuguese captain-major of the seas of Arabia Afonso de Albuquerque conquered the coastal cities of Oman with a six ship squadron and about 500 men, imposing the payment of a tribute in exchange for autonomous rule. In 1515, as Governor of India Albuquerque captured the city of Hormuz itself, by the entrance of the Persian Gulf, and erected on it the Fort of Our Lady of the Conception. Hormuz and its provinces were thus reduced to a Portuguese protectorate, and since then, Portuguese merchants and military garrisons were established on Oman, most importantly Muscat, due to its sheltered deep-water harbour.

The sheikh of Muscat Râshid b. Ahmad Muscatî supported the Portuguese, and in turn the Portuguese protected him from Omani rivalries, namely the wâzir of Qalhât, Ra’îs Shebabdîn, excessive taxation from Hormuz, and Banu Jabr raids from the interior. Muscat became increasingly important to the logistics of Portuguese armadas operating in the Persian Gulf. In 1521, Hormuz revolted against Portugal, and sheikh Rashid was ordered to massacre all Portuguese in Muscat, but he refused. He was appointed vizier of Hormuz in 1529, and succeeded upon his death in 1534 by his son Ahmad.

In 1523, Sohar rebelled, but it was pacified by Dom Luís de Menezes, while Muscat and Qalhat rebelled in 1526 but were likewise pacified.

Muscat was raided by Ottoman fleets in 1546, 1551, and again in 1581. The Portuguese fortified the city in their aftermath, concluding the forts Almirante (Al-Mirani) and São João (Jalali) in 1588. A fort was erected at Khor Fakkan in 1621.

In 1622, Hormuz was captured by Safavid Persia with the aid of the English East India Company. The Kingdom of Hormuz was dissolved and the Portuguese relocated their forces to Oman, which was placed under the direct rule of a Portuguese captain-general, seated in Muscat. From Oman the Portuguese not only developed the trade in the region but conducted attacks on the Persian coast on English or Dutch navigation in the Gulf.

Julfar was captured by the Yarubids in 1633. Sohar followed in 1643. Muscat was besieged by the Yarubids in 1648, and peace treaty negotiated with the Portuguese, but the city was again attacked two years later and fell. In 1656 the Portuguese evacuated Khasab, thus putting an end to Portuguese rule in the region.

== Trade ==
Basic exports of Oman in the 16th century included cereals such as barley and wheat, fresh fruit and oils, coffee, incense and aloe gum, dates, raisins, salt and dried fish. Cairo production, producted from coconut fibers and used in naval rigging was meaningful. Some small scale naval industry took place at Muscat. Nomadic bedouins moved flocks of goats and sheep from remote areas to the coastline cities. Camel caravans moved from Oman across the Arabian peninsula and towards the Iranian plateau. Arabian horses exported through Oman, mainly conveyed to Hormuz, the regional sorting centre for horses, were considered among the best in the world. Muscat specialized in producing a specialized horse bedding to ensure the animals safe journey, called "herb of Muscat" or "Mecca straw". The horse trade was extremely profitable, each animal being sold from the equivalent of 1000 to 2000 ducats, and profits estimated at 300 and 500%. They were only embarked in Muscat, Qalhat and Khorfakkan. From the coastal cities, rice, sugar and spices were imported mainly from India into the hinterland.

== Portuguese fortresses in Oman ==
Along the Omani coast the Portuguese erected forts and installed garrisons to defend the territory from incursions from pirates, the Persians and local Arab tribes from the interior.

- Mascate – Muscat – headquarters of the Portuguese captain-general of the sea of Hormuz responsible for all Portuguese operations in Oman, the Persian Gulf and Red Sea.
- Borca – Barka
- Calaiate – Qalhat
- Cassapo – Khasab
- Curiate – Qurayyat
- Doba – Dibba
- Dubo – Dubbo
- Julfar – Julfar
- Libedia – Al Badiyah
- Lima – Limah
- Madá – Madha
- Matara – Muttrah
- Corfação – Khor Fakkan
- Sibo – Seeb
- Soar – Sohar
- Quelba – Kalba

== Gallery ==
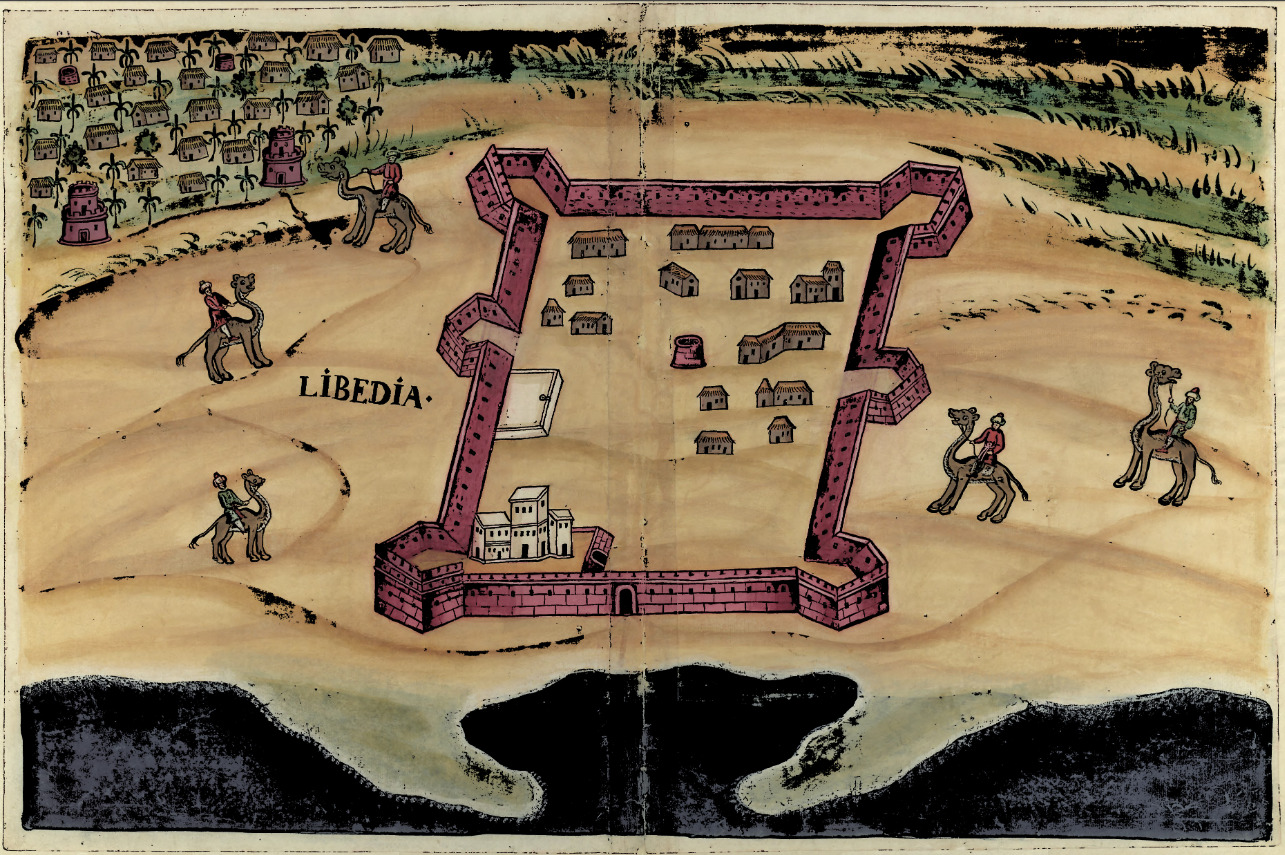
Libedia

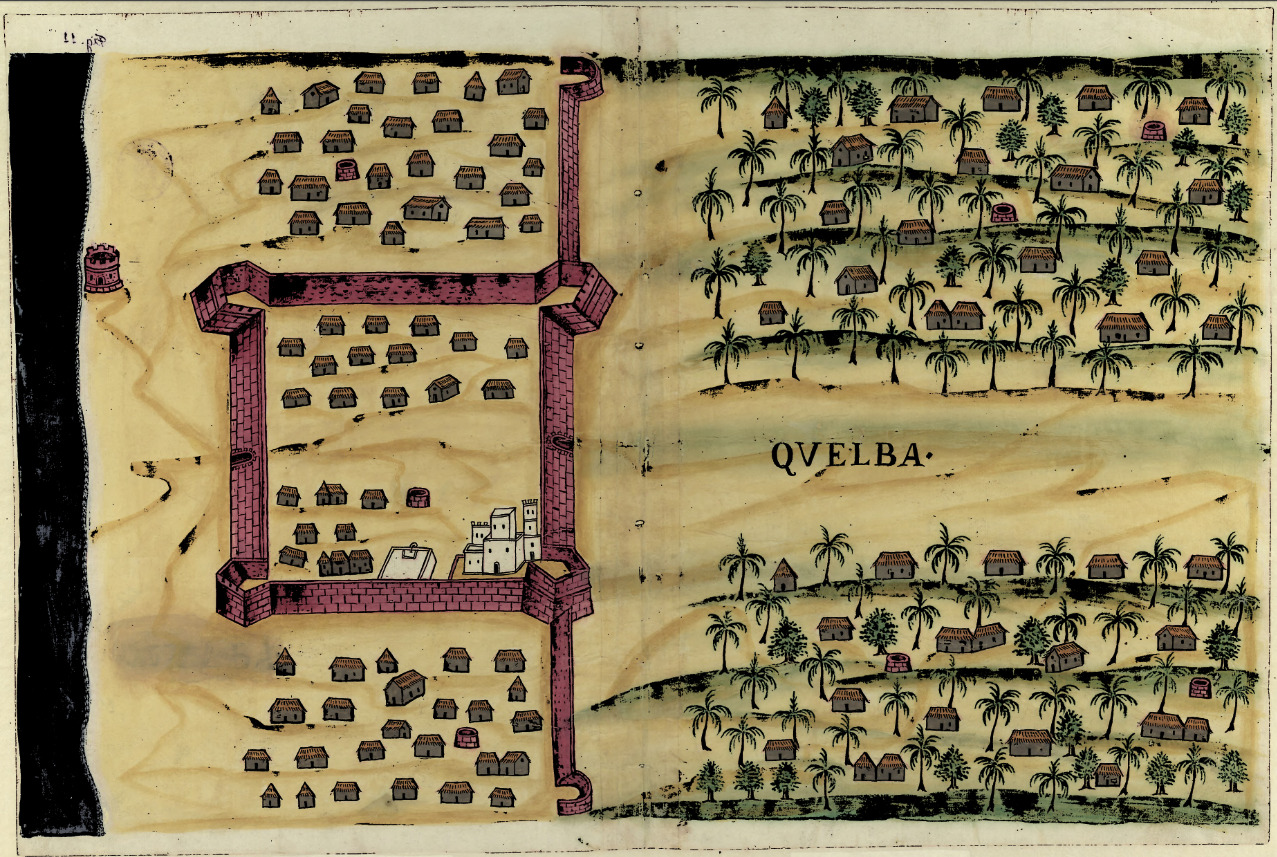
Quelba

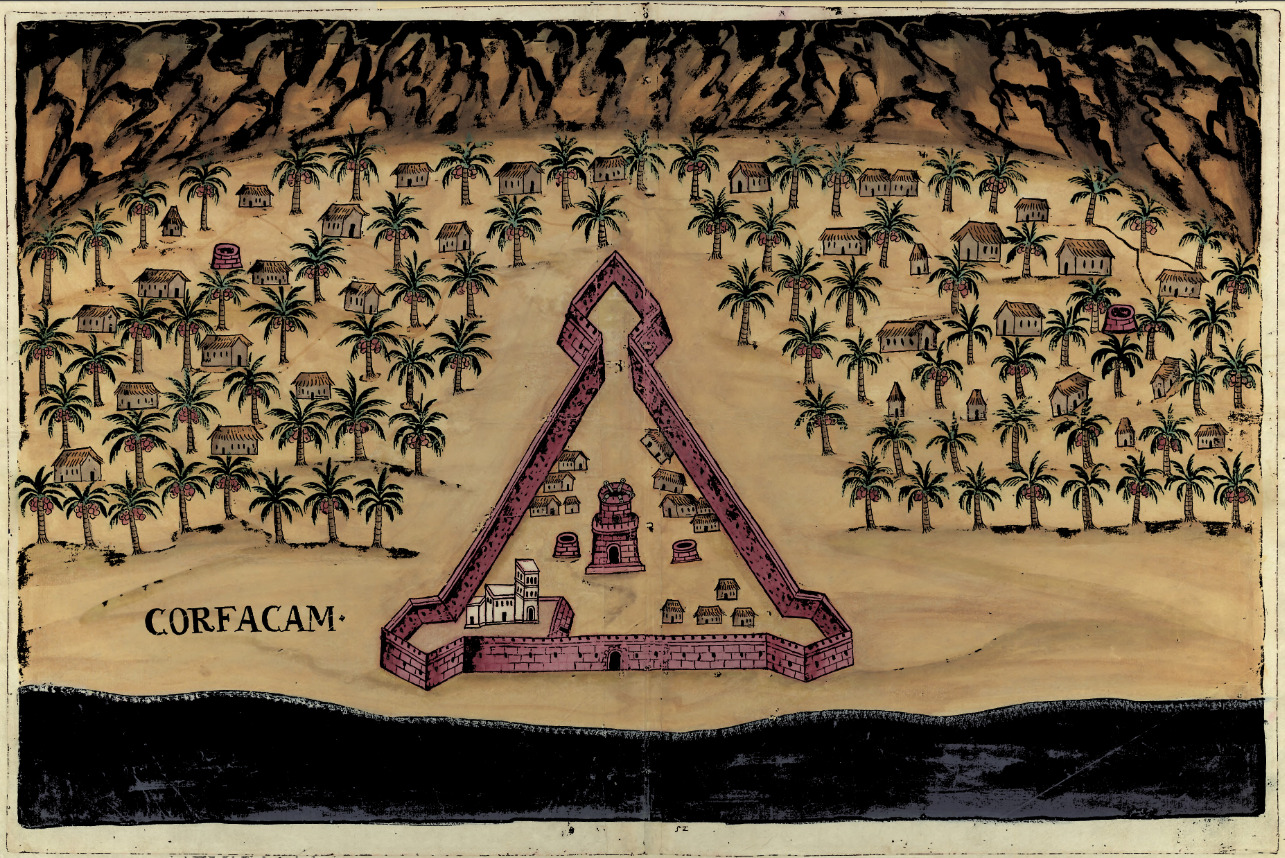
Corfação

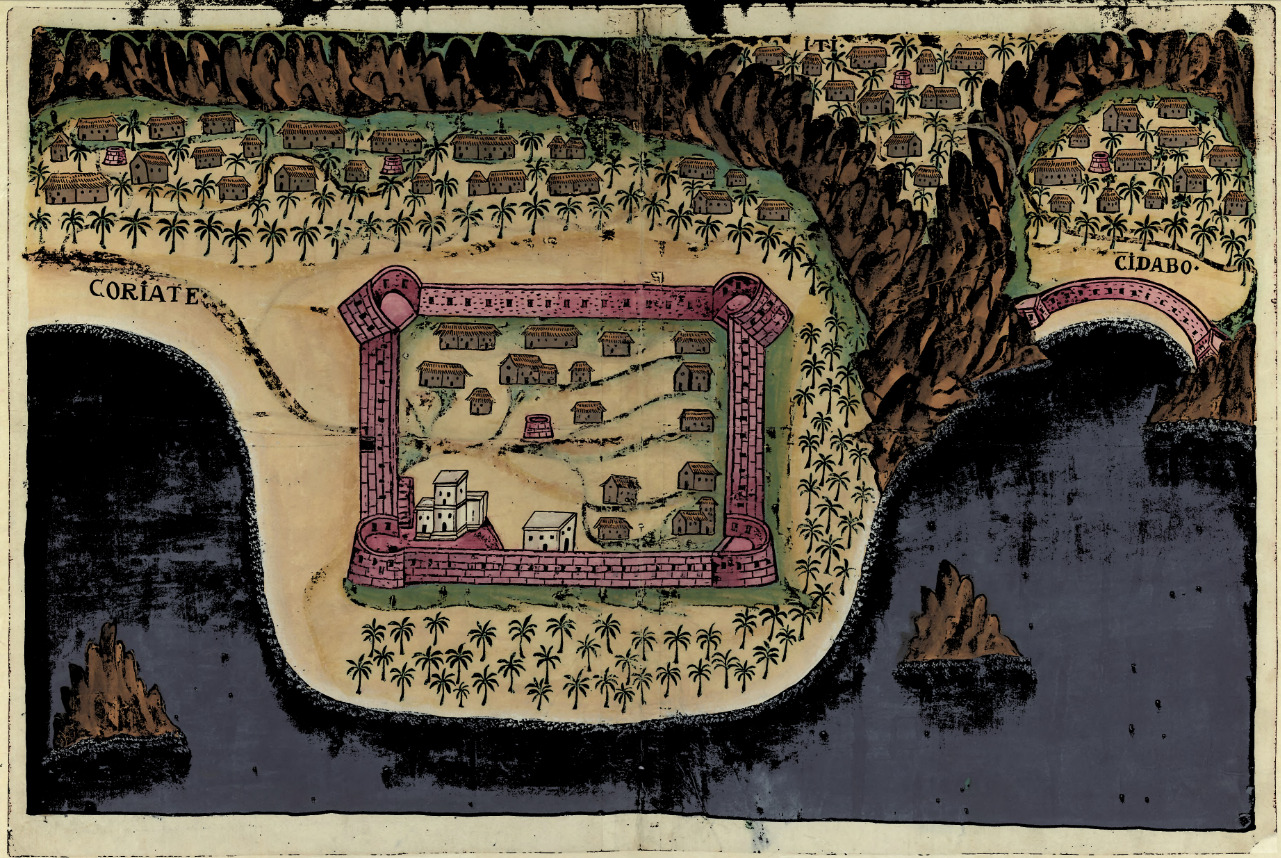
Curiate

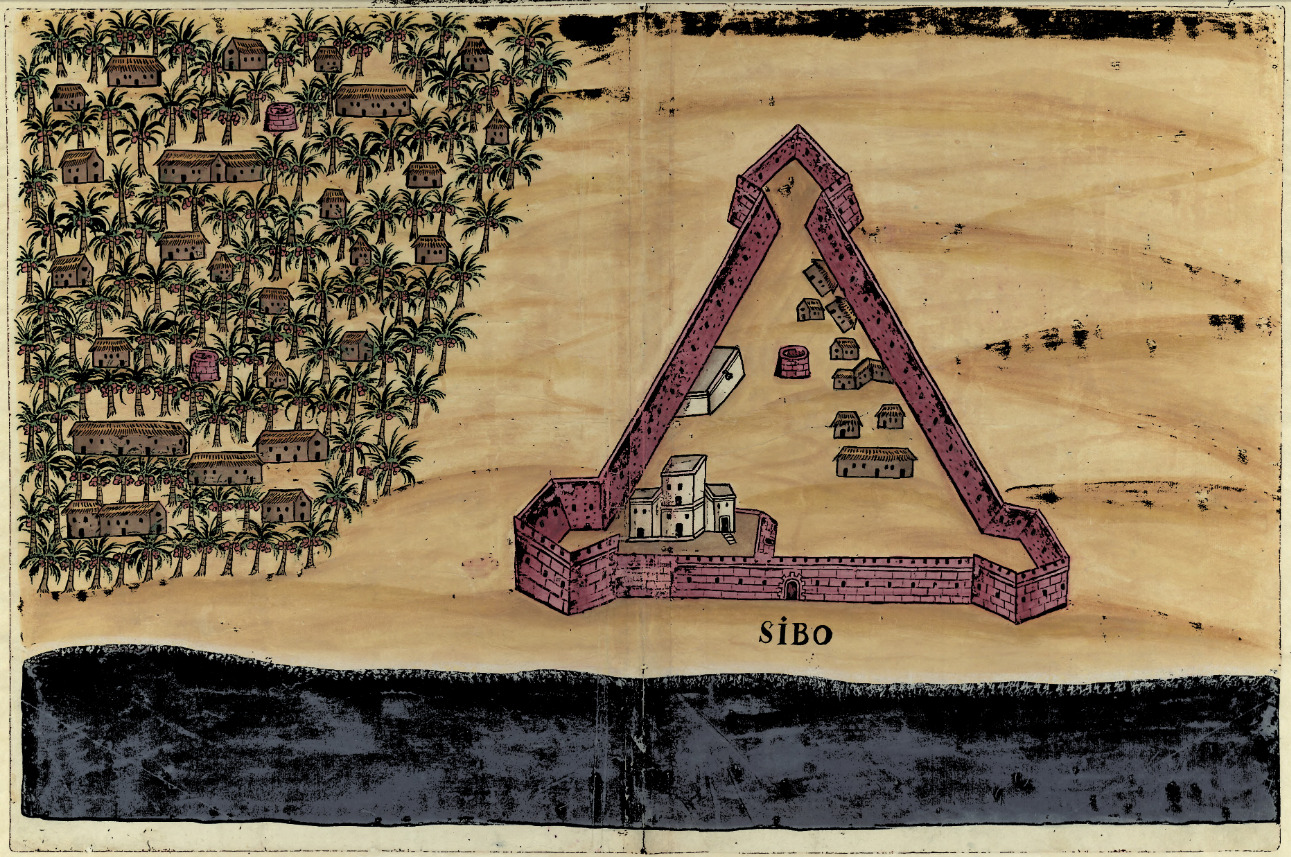
Sibo

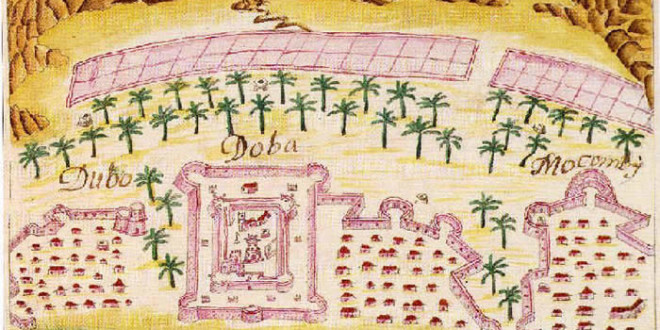
Dibba

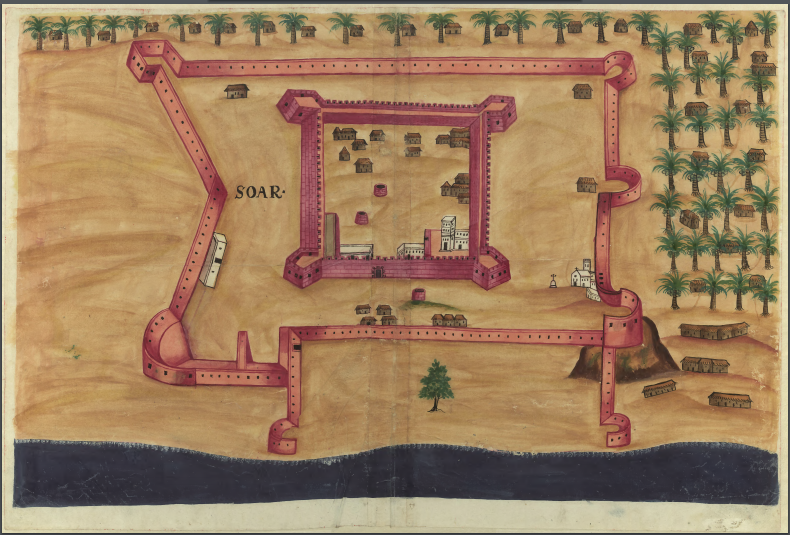
Soar

== See also ==
- Battle of the Gulf of Oman
- Portuguese Socotra
