= Nasir bin Murshid =

- Imam

Imam of Oman
- Reign: 1624–1649
- Predecessor: Omair bin Himyar
- Successor: Sultan bin Saif
- Died: 14 April 1649
- Dynasty: Yaruba
- Father: Murshid bin Sultan bin Malik bin Bil'arab al-Ya'rubi

Nasir bin Murshid (Arabic: ناصر بن مرشد) (died 14 April 1649) was the founder of the Yaruba dynasty of Imams of Oman, a member of the Ibadi sect. He ruled from 1624 to 1649. He took power during a chaotic period when the former dynasty had collapsed and the interior of the country was lawless, while the Portuguese held the main coastal ports. In a series of campaigns he established his authority over the Omani tribes.

== Background ==
By the early 17th century the ruling Nabhani dynasty of Oman had become weakened, exerting control over only half of the kingdom. The interior of Oman was divided into a number of small states and tribal regions. Ibadi tribes originating from Yemen had once formed the large majority, but over time Sunni Nizar tribes had become equal in strength, in part due to immigration.

Two Nabhani brothers were competing for power, Makhzoom bin Fellah bin Mohsin at Yanqul and Nebhan bin Fellah. Around 1615 Makhzoom died and his cousin Omair bin Himyar entered the fray, defeating Nebhan bin Fellah at Yanqul in 1617.

Omair bin Himyar died around 1624, the last of his dynasty, and a succession struggle erupted. The leading candidates were from the Yaareba, one of the best established and most powerful of the tribes. Malik bin Abul Arar al-Yaarebi controlled Rustaq and tried to seize power. An assembly of notables was convened at Rustaq to settle the matter, and Sheikh Nasir bin Murshid Al-Yaarebi was unanimously elected Imam.

== Internal struggles ==
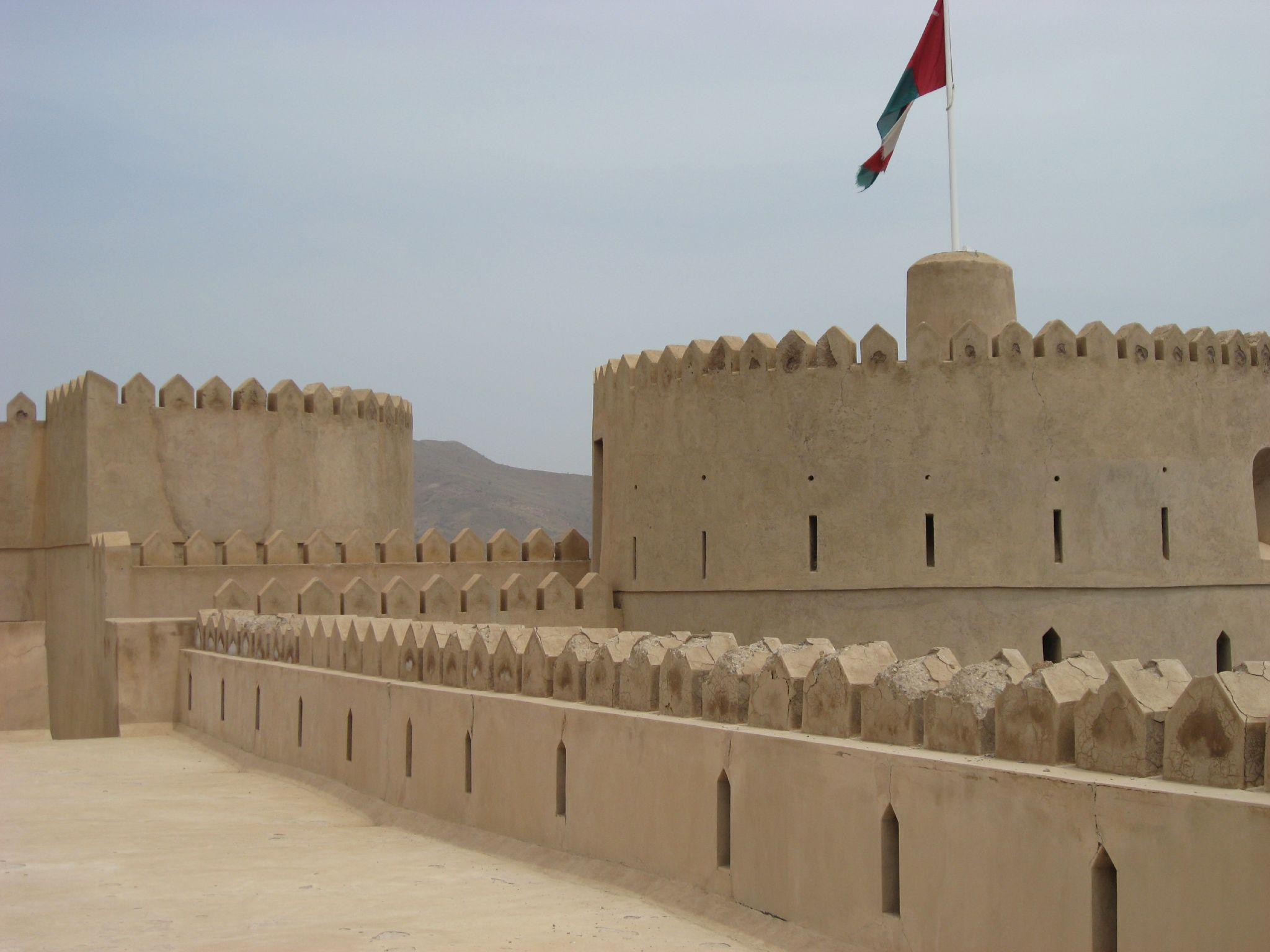
Rustaq fort

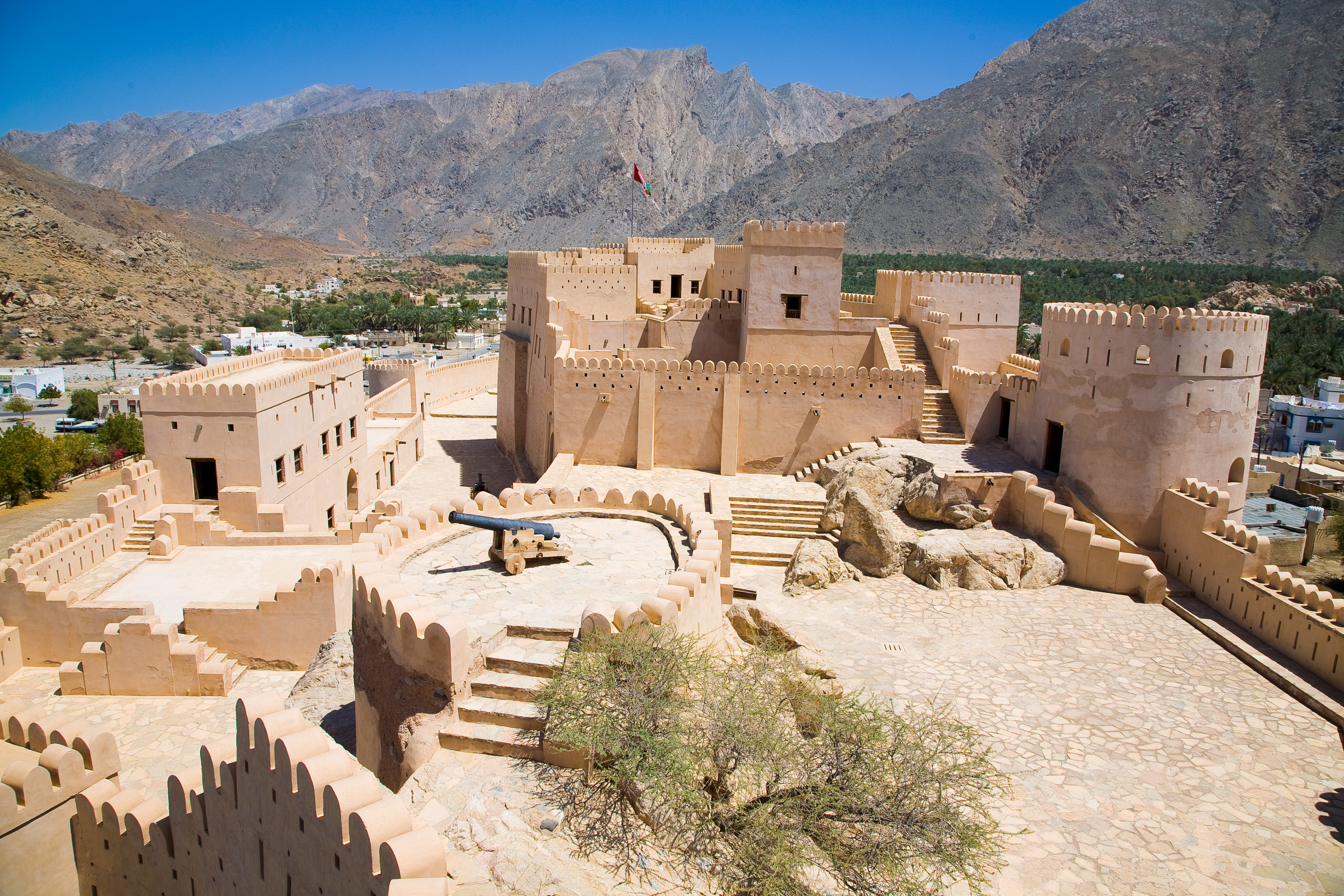
Nakhal fort

The new Imam was not universally accepted, and faced a potential threat from the Nizar tribes. Nasir bin Murshid immediately began to assert control over the interior. Nasir bin Murshid built up his army and took the main towns as well as the forts of Rustaq and Nakhal. He quickly took the Rustaq fort, which had been held by his cousins since his grandfather Malik bin Abul Arar had died in 1620.

In 1625, Nasir gathered a force that he led to Nakhal, which he captured from his great uncle Sultan bin Abul Arar. He was attacked in this position, but broke out and returned to Rustaq, then took Izki and Nizwa. Nasir moved the capital to Nizwa, the former capital of the Ibadi Imamate.

Nasir continued his successful campaign, eventually feeling strong enough to attack the Nizar tribes, who controlled the Al Dhahireh region. The campaign was protracted, lasting several years, but was militarily successful although the Nizar tribes remained hostile. In the 1630s, Nasir faced a challenge from a group of Nizar tribes led by the Beni Hilal under Sheikh Nasir bin Katan al-Helali.

The Beni Hilal raids, for the purpose of taking slaves and booty, became a menace that the Imam was unable to suppress. Eventually he had to resort to paying a large ransom to Sheikh Nasir, which resolved the problem.

== Campaigns against the Portuguese ==
Nasir was able to unify the tribes with a common goal of expelling the Portuguese, who had taken control of the coastal cities of Sur, Qurayyat, Muscat and Sohar. Around 1633 Nasir raised a large army that he dispatched in an unsuccessful attempt to take Muscat.

Nasir next dispatched an army against Julfar (now Ras al-Khaimah). This port was defended by two forts, one manned by the Persians and the other by the Portuguese. Both forts were captured and the Persians were ejected. The Portuguese were also forced to leave Julfar.

In 1633, Nasir sent an army against Sohar, also held by the Portuguese, but it was defeated. A temporary truce was arranged with the Portuguese, but Nasir then took Sur and Qurayyat from the Portuguese, who were now seriously weakened and demoralized.

In 1643, he took the fort at Sohar. In 1646, he signed a trade agreement with Britain. In 1648, fighting resumed against the Portuguese, who now held only Muscat. A treaty was agreed in October 1648 very much to the Omani advantage.

Nasir bin Murshid died on 14 April 1649 and was buried at Nizwa. He was succeeded by his cousin, Sultan bin Saif, who was to soon drive the Portuguese entirely out of the country.
