= Sultan bin Saif =

- Imam

Imam of Oman
- Reign: 1649-1679
- Predecessor: Nasir bin Murshid
- Successor: Bil'arab bin Sultan
- Died: c. 1679
- Dynasty: Yaruba
- Father: Saif bin Malik bin Bil'arab al-Ya'rubi

Sultan bin Saif bin Malik (Arabic: سلطان بن سيف اليعربي) (died c. 1679) was the second of the Yaruba dynasty of Imams of Oman, a member of the Ibadi sect. He ruled from 1649 to 1679. He completed the work of his predecessor, Nasir bin Murshid, in driving the Portuguese out of Oman. Their last base in Muscat fell to his forces in January 1650. He built up Omani sea power, taking the fight against the Portuguese to their bases in India and East Africa. During his reign the country was peaceful and increasingly prosperous.

== Accession ==
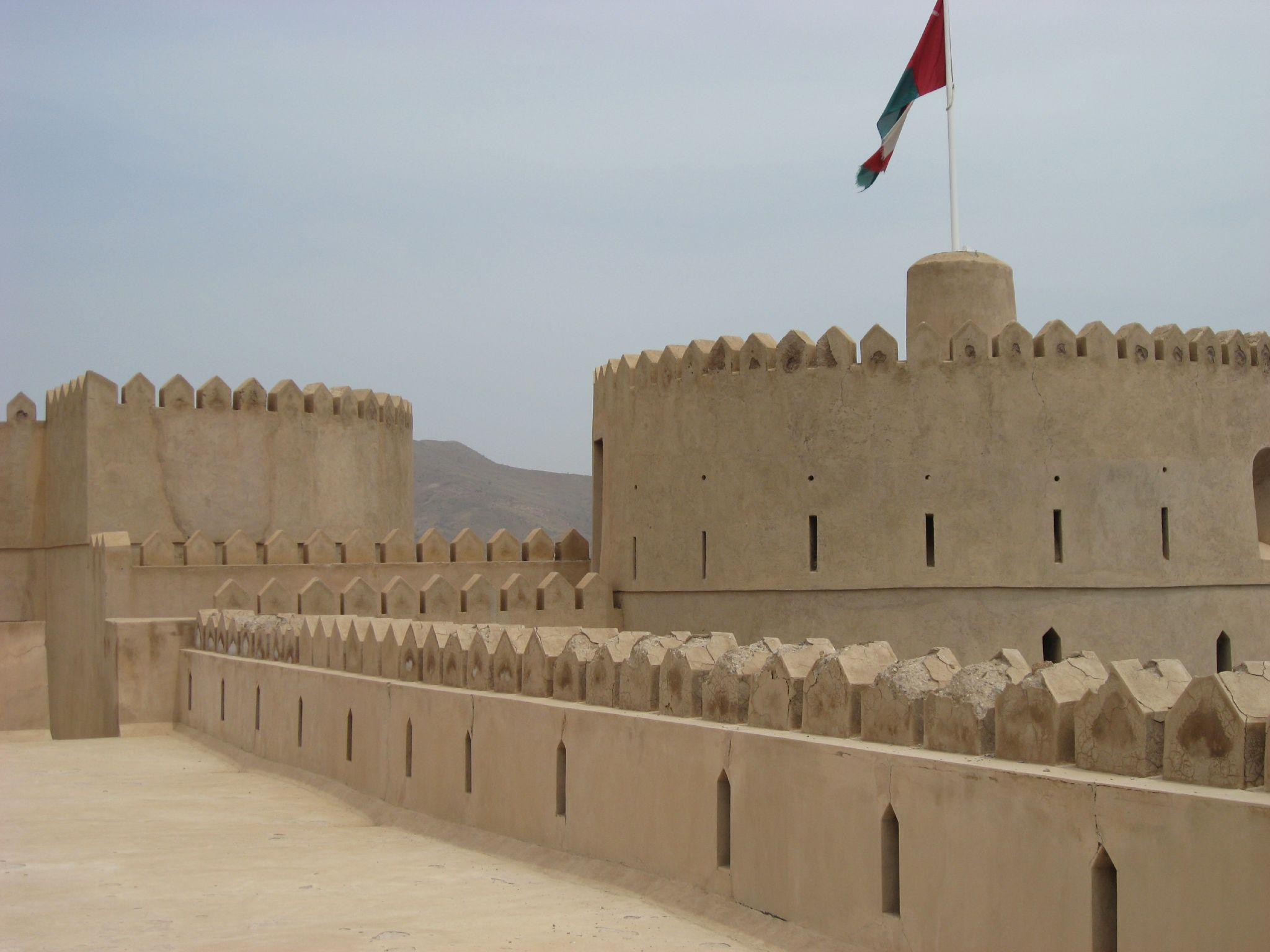
Rustaq fort

Sultan bin Saif was the cousin of the Imam Nasir bin Murshid bin Sultan al Ya'Aruba, who had founded the Yaruba dynasty in 1624. The Imam Nasir died on 14 April 1649 and was buried at Nizwa. He left no sons. The notables who gathered at Rustaq on the day he died selected Sultan bin Saif and proclaimed him Imam. The succession appears to have been undisputed.

== War with the Portuguese ==
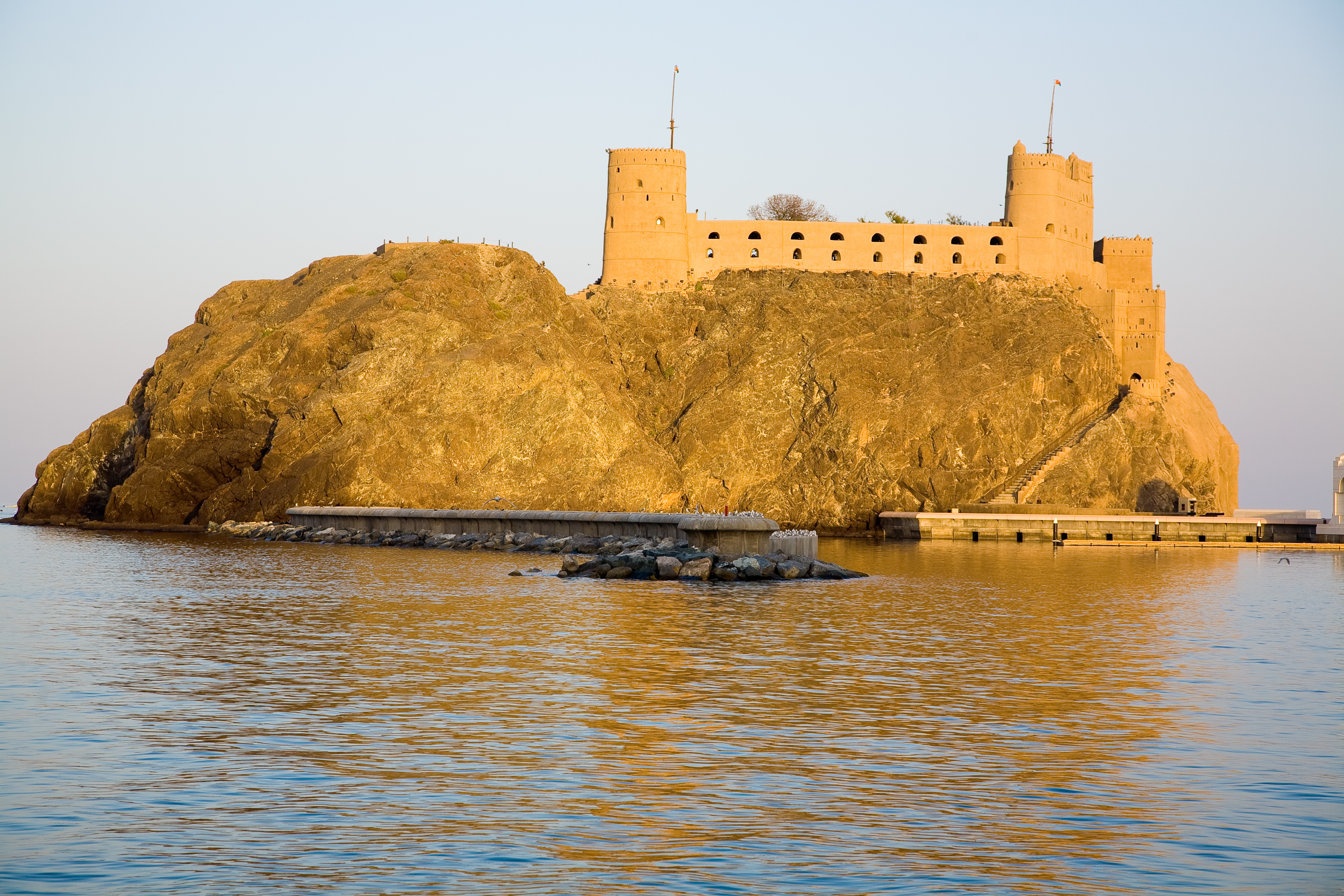
Fort Al Jalali, built by the Portuguese in Muscat harbor

When Nasir died, the Portuguese, who had once occupied several ports along the coast, now only had a tenuous hold on Muscat. Sultan bin Saif was resolved to finish the task of expelling them from Oman, but first built up his own fleet. He started his campaign against Muscat towards the end of 1649. Although Sultan gathered a large force outside the port of Muttrah, next to Muscat, the town was captured by a small group that made a surprise attack at night. (Note: Another account says that Muscat was taken by men who entered the town disguised as peasants with their weapons hidden in vegetable baskets.) The Portuguese commander took refuge in Fort Capitan. (Note: About 600 Portuguese managed to escape by sea, while others fled into the fort. They surrendered on 23 January 1650. Since Fort Al Jalali seems to have been the stronger of the two forts, it has been speculated that the Portuguese took refuge there rather than in Fort Al-Mirani, as traditionally believed.) On 28 January 1650 it surrendered. The Omanis also captured two Portuguese naval vessels that were anchored in the port of Muttrah. Following this the Portuguese continued sporadic war at sea, but made no serious effort to recapture Muscat.

Sultan bin Saif initiated a naval offensive against the Portuguese bases in India and on the east coast of Africa. He added captured ships to his navy, which became increasingly powerful. Sultan launched a raid on the Portuguese at Mumbai in India in 1655. The Omani fleet attacked the Portuguese in Mumbai in 1661 and Diu in 1668, 1670 and 1676. Sultan received a petition from the people of Mombasa on the East African coast asking for help in removing the Portuguese and offering to accept Omani sovereignty in return. A force was dispatched and blockaded the fort of Mombasa for five years before it surrendered. An Arab governor was installed. However, the Portuguese returned soon after and recaptured the town.

== Trade and construction ==
The Dutch had a factory at Gombroon, now Bandar Abbas, on the Persian side of the Strait of Hormuz. After the fall of Muscat in 1650 they received large shipments of goods from the Netherlands and greatly expanded their trade in the Persian Gulf region. In 1651 Sultan bin Saif visited Gombroon in person, and offered to open a land route for the Dutch traders via Abu Dhabi and Qatif to Basra by which the Dutch could avoid paying Persian customs duties. The Dutch politely declined.

In 1659 Sultan bin Saif was visited by Colonel Rainsford of the English East India Company, seeking to negotiate a lease on the port of Muscat. Sultan refused this request. Trade mounted from Omanis based in Africa, bringing wealth into the country. Sultan bin Saif's trading activity drew criticism from the religious leaders, who felt that this was inappropriate for an Imam.

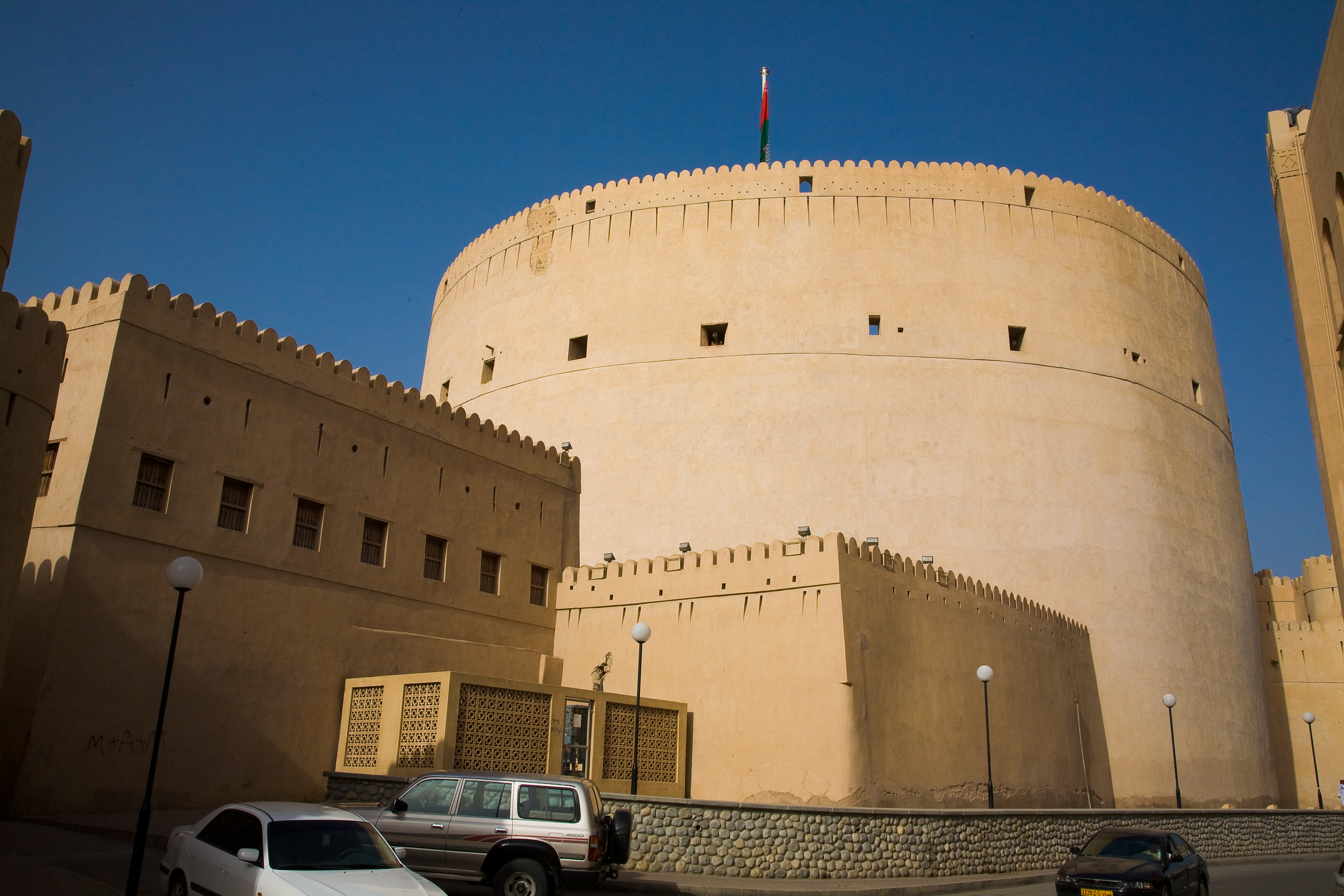
The round tower of the Nizwa Fort, built by Sultan bin Saif

Some of the new wealth was used to fund construction of the aflaj underground water system. Sultan bin Saif built the falaj daris from Izki to Nizwa, the largest falaj in the country. He erected the huge round tower of the Nizwa Fort. The structure, 30 metres (98 ft) high, was built on an earlier fort that had itself been assembled from several smaller forts. This was where he located his capital. Sultan bin Saif set up a strong and stable administration, with governors and judges who applied the laws justly. According to George Percy Badger, in his 1871 A History of the Imaums and Sayyids of Oman,

Oman revived during his Government and prospered. The People rested from their troubles, prices were low, roads were safe, the merchants made large profits and the crops were abundant. The Imam himself was humble. He used to traverse the streets without an escort, and would talk familiarly with the people. Thus he persevered in ordaining what was lawful and forbidding what we unlawful.

Sultan bin Saif died in 1679 and was succeeded by his son, Bil'arab bin Sultan. (Note: Sources differ considerably on the date of Sultan bin Saif's death. One authority gives 11 November 1668 and another gives 4 October 1679.)
