= Qurayyat, Oman =

Qurayyat قريات
- Village
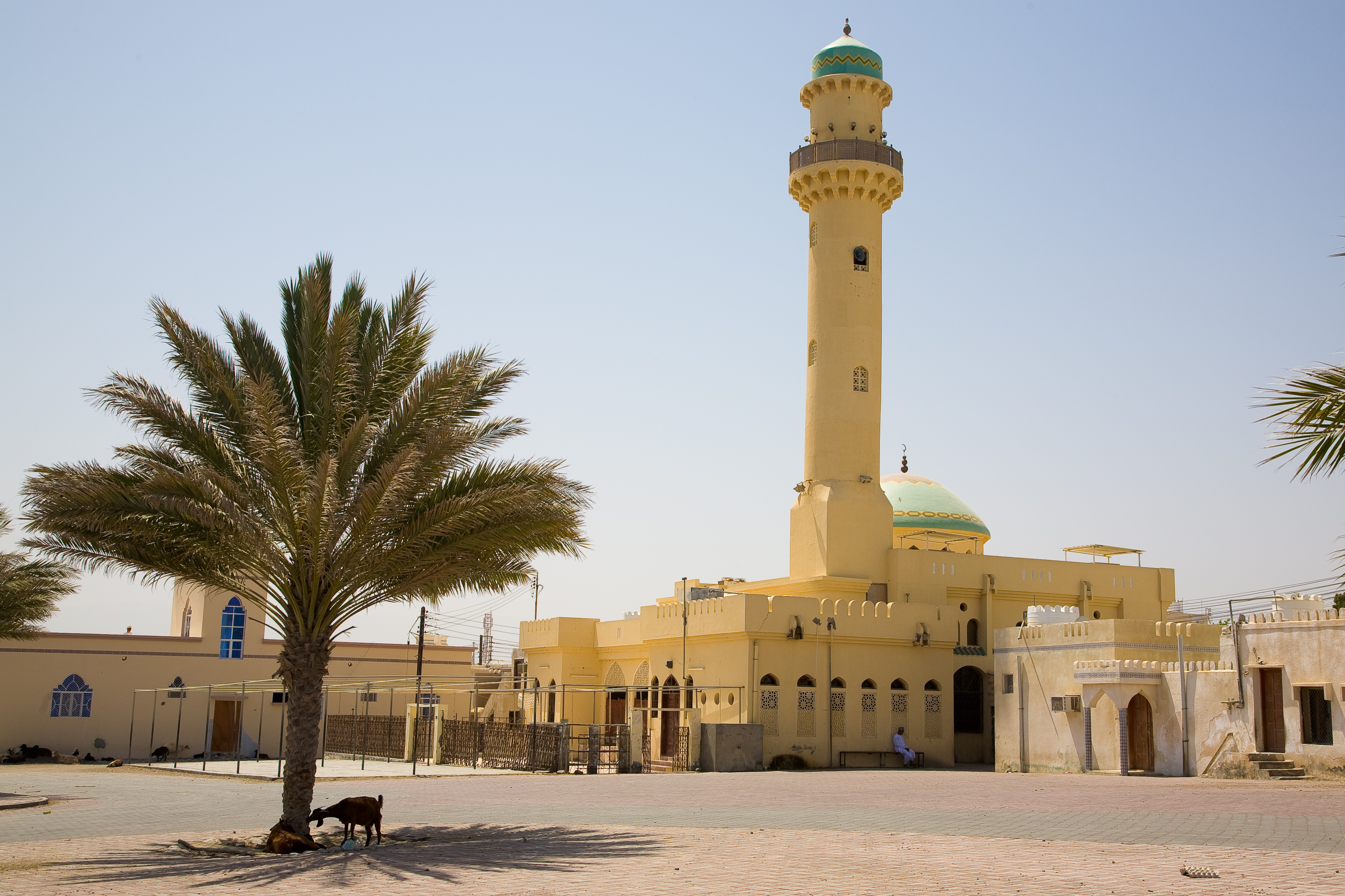

- Location in Oman
- Coordinates: 23.320°N 58.908°E
- Country: Oman
- Governorate: Muscat

Population (2019)
  - Total: 63,133
- Time zone: UTC+4 (+4)

Qurayyat is a small fishing town 83 km southeast of Muscat, Oman, adjacent to the towns of Sur, Diman Wa Tayeen and Aamerat.

A popular stopping point on the way to Sur, Qurayyat is in itself also a very popular destination for Muscat.

On 28 June 2018, Qurayyat set the record for the highest daily "low" temperature ever recorded at 42.6 °C (108.7 °F).

== Climate ==
Given that the state is coastal, the humidity levels rise up to extremes especially in summer, while mountains remain relatively lower levels of humidity, al-Jabal al-Aswad (The Black Mountain) is located in the inner parts of the state and it is known for extreme cold weathers in winter and moderate heat in summer.

== Qurayyat's icon ==
Most states in Oman have an icon that generally represents the state (for example, lemon tree for Saham), and for Qurayyat it is the Capra, given that the animal's habitat is scattered across the mountains of Qurayyat and the connection between Capra and Qurayyat's people.

== Landmarks ==
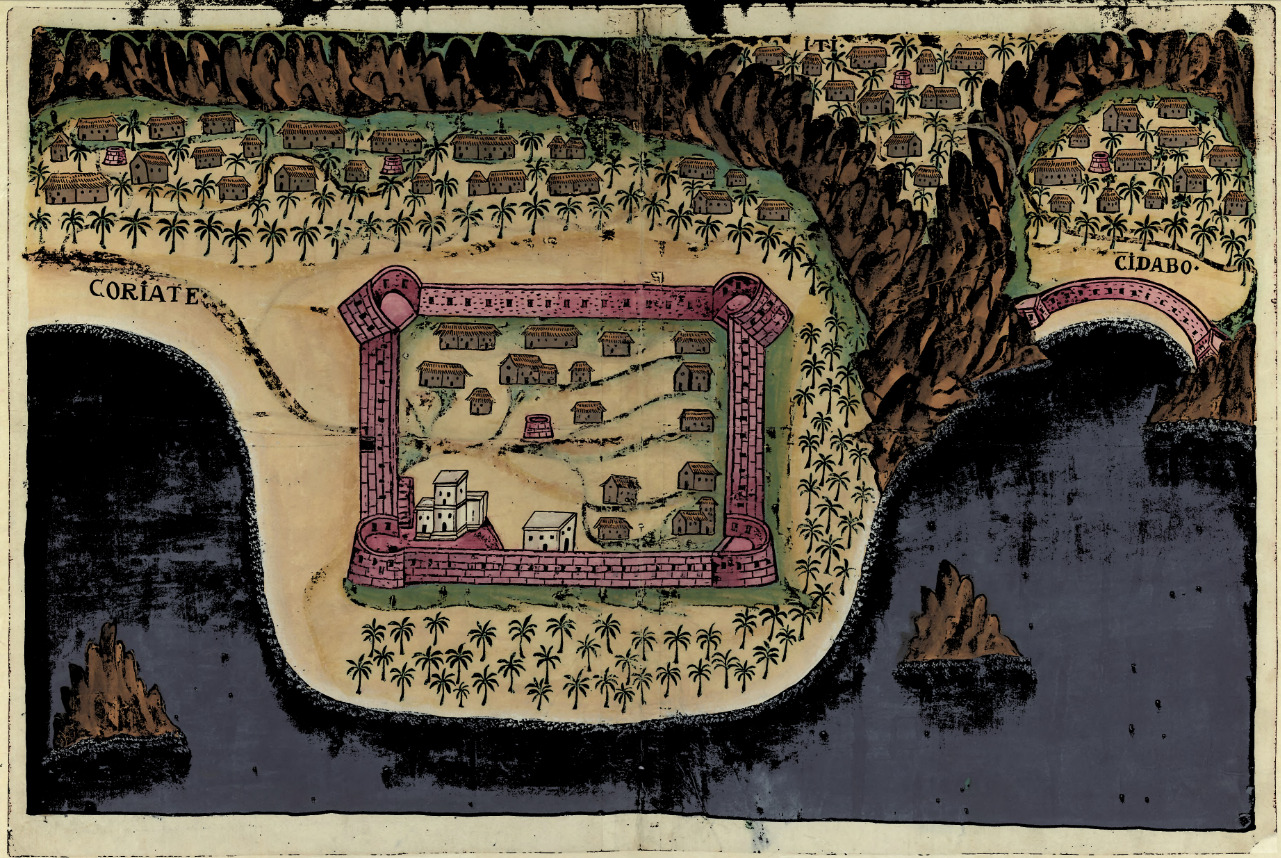
Qurayyat (Curiate) Portuguese Fortress in the 17th century. Antonio Bocarro's "Livro das plantas de todas as Fortalezas, cidades e povoações da Índia Oriental"

Qurayyat has many historical landmarks with the first being Quaryyat Fort which was built by Said bin Khalfan al-Busaidi around 200 years ago, the fort was built for defense as well as residential purposes. The fort was modified in 1987 to become a museum to contain the states historical pottery and weaponry.

Another historical landmark is Sheikh Malik's Mosque, which is located near Qurayyat Fort, the remarkable feature of this mosque is its height which makes it visible from a distance.

Khor al-Milh (Salt Estuary) is located 6 km south of the center of Qurayyat and it is one of the most impactful locations in the state as fossil fuels and human presence remains were found there that are linked back to 3000–4000 BC. The naming of the place comes from the craft of its people as for hundreds of years, people extract salt in traditional ways.

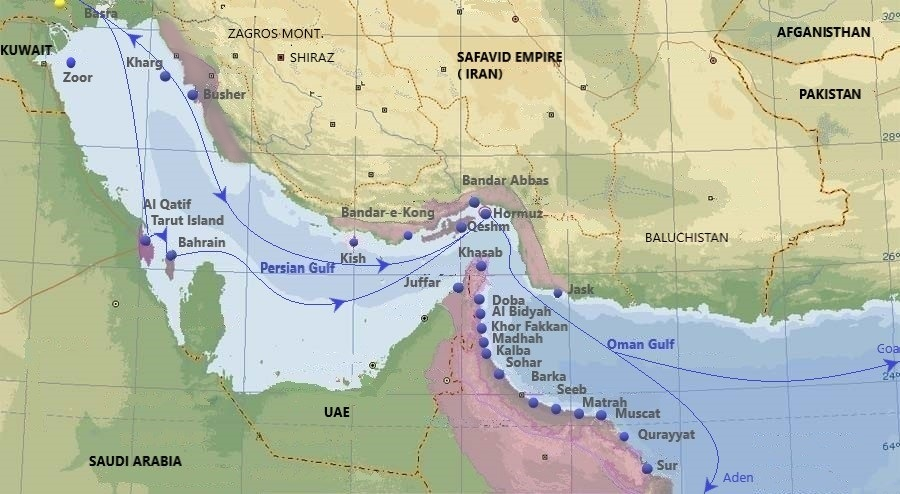
Purple - Portuguese Empire in the Persian Gulf in the 16th and 17th centuries. Main cities, ports and routes.

== Portuguese ==
The Portuguese arrived in the 16th century. The village was a strategic point to control the Oman Gulf and access to the Persian Gulf. It was part of a chain of fortresses the Portuguese Empire had in this region. The Fortress and village were drawn in the beginning of the 17th century for a book by Antóno Bocarro.

== See also ==
- List of cities in Oman
