= 2026 in Oman =

- Decades: 2000s; 2010s; 2020s
- See also: Other events of 2026; Timeline of Omani history

This articles lists events from the year 2026 in Oman.

== Incumbents ==
Photo	Post	Name
	Sultan/Prime Minister of Oman	Haitham bin Tariq Al Said

== Events ==
=== January ===
- January 27 – A tourist boat capsizes in the Gulf of Oman off Muscat, killing three French nationals.

=== February ===
- February 6 – Indirect negotiations between Iran and the United States regarding the nuclear program of Iran are held in Muscat.

=== March ===
- March 1 – 2026 Iranian strikes on Oman: the port of Duqm is hit by Iranian strikes during the 2026 Israeli–United States strikes on Iran, causing material damage and one person injured. An oil tanker north of the port of Khasab is also struck with four injuries.
- March 12
  - The government orders the evacuation of vessels from the Mina Al Fahal oil port.
  - Deputy prime minister Fahd bin Mahmoud Al Said dies at the age of 85.
- March 13 – Two people are killed in a drone strike on the al-Awahi Industrial Area in Sohar.

=== July ===
- July 24 – The United States imposes a 12.5% tariff on Oman, citing the presence of alleged forced labour in the supply chain.

=== October ===
- 30 October – The Royal Navy of Oman rescues 25 crew members from the RITI, a tanker flying the Panamanian flag that was transporting two million barrels of crude oil when it was attacked and caught fire 1.6 nautical miles (3.0 km) off the coast of the Musandam Governorate.

=== November ===
- 11 November – Iranian forces attack ship navigation systems on Didamar Island, causing an unknown amount of damage.

== Holidays ==
- 11 January – Accession Day
- 16–18 January – Prophet's Ascension
- 18–23 March – End of Ramadan
- 26–29 May – Feast of the Sacrifice
- 16 June – Islamic New Year
- 25 August – Prophet's Birthday
- 20 November – National Day

== Deaths ==
- 12 March – Fahd bin Mahmoud al Said, 81–82, deputy prime minister (since 1972)
- 30 July – Nadhira Al Harthy, 48, civil servant and mountaineer
