= 2027 in Oman =

- Decades: 2000s; 2010s; 2020s
- See also: Other events of 2027; Timeline of Omani history

This articles lists events from the year 2027 in Oman.

== Events ==
- October – 2027 Omani general election

== Holidays ==
- 11 January – Accession Day
- 8–11 March – End of Ramadan
- 15–18 May – Feast of the Sacrifice
- 6 June – Islamic New Year
- 14 August – Prophet's Birthday
- 18 November – National Day
- 25–28 December – Prophet's Ascension
