= Dhank =

Dhank ضنك
- Wilayat
- Location in Oman
- Coordinates: 23°33′N 56°15′E
- Country: Oman
- Governorate: Ad Dhahirah
- Province: Dhank

Population (2020)
  - Total: 23,466

Dhank (Arabic: ضنك) is a wilayah (province) of Ad Dhahirah Governorate in Oman. It borders the provinces of Al Buraimi on the northwest, Ibri on the southwest and Yanqul on the east. It has many valleys, such as Wadi Al Fateh and Wadi Qumeirah.

In October 1870, it saw the Battle of Dhank, between the forces of Omani Imam Azzan bin Qais and Sultan of Muscat Turki bin Said. The battle, won by Turki bin Said, was a key conflict to establishing the Sultanate of Muscat and Oman.

== Climate ==
In the afternoon, mild bouts of overcast. Temperatures vary between 25 and 32°C.

== Tourist attractions ==
Dhank is surrounded by many wadis, which are among the notable tourist destinations in the wilayat.

Wadi Al Fateh is on of several wadis in the wilayat. It is known for mountainous terrains, which includes grottoes and rock formations, and for castles and forts erected along the wadi's banks. A stretch of wadis with date orchards blooming along their banks breaks up the wilayat.

Among other attractions in the province is Al Hazm Fort, an early 18th century fort built by Saif bin Sultan.

== Traditional crafts ==
Some traditional activities carried out by the wilayat include tanning leather, collecting rose water, and raising honey bees.

== Economic activities ==
The people who live in Dhank engage in a variety of customary trades and professions as part of their everyday lives, including as farming, wood collection, and cattle husbandry.
