= Battle of Dhank =

Date	October 1870
Location	Dhank, Oman
Result	Turki bin Said's victory

Belligerents
(Muscat and Oman) Sultan of Muscat forces Support: Emirate of Dubai; Emirate of Ajman (Emirate of Ras Al Khaimah) Ras Al Khaimah; Tribal support: Na'im and Bani Qitab	(Muscat and Oman) Imamate of Oman; Support: Emirate of Abu Dhabi; Emirate of Sharjah

Commanders and leaders
(Muscat and Oman) Turki bin Said (Emirate of Dubai) Hasher bin Maktoum (Emirate of Ajman) Rashid bin Humaid	Azzan bin Qais (Emirate of Abu Dhabi) Zayed bin Khalifa (Emirate of Sharjah) Salim bin Sultan

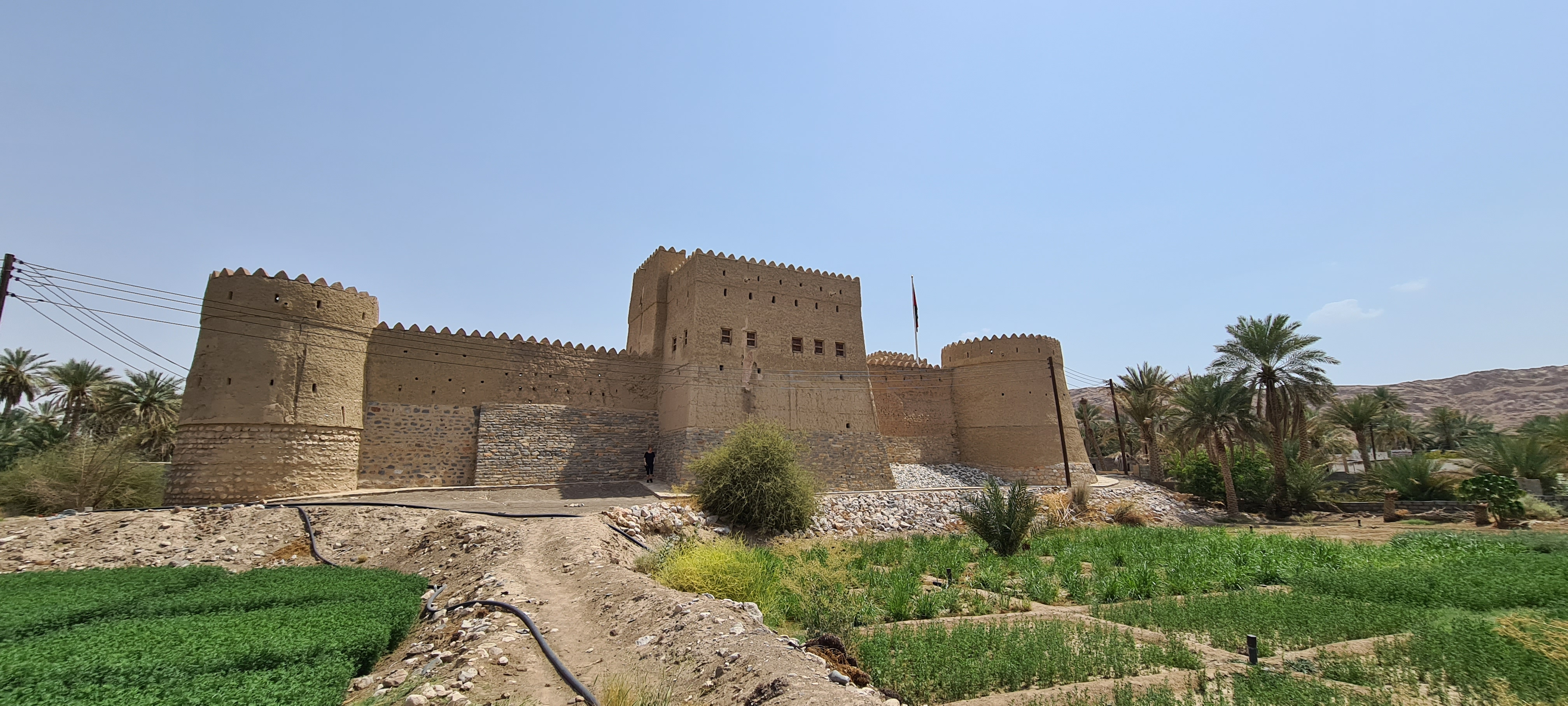
Dhank Fort

The Battle of Dhank took place in October 1870, ranging forces in support of the Omani Imam Azzan bin Qais against Turki bin Said, Sultan of Muscat. The battle was won by Turki bin Said backed by forces from Dubai, Ajman and Ras Al Khaimah as well as mounted fighters from the Na'im and Bani Qitab tribes.

== Background ==
Azzan bin Qais was the Imam of Oman between 1868 and 1870, having deposed Sayyid Salim bin Thuwaini. Azzan opposed the Saudi interference in the Buraimi Oasis and took control of Buraimi in 1869. Zayed bin Khalifa Al Nahyan of Abu Dhabi (known as Zayed the Great) supported Azzan bin Qais, who paid Abu Dhabi a stipend for its defence of Buraimi, but the Sultan of Muscat, Turki bin Said, canvassed support for his cause from other Trucial Rulers. In early 1870 Turki visited Dubai with that goal in mind but, tempted though the other Trucial Sheikhs were to support Turki against Abu Dhabi's powerful leader, Zayed, and the Imam Azzan bin Qais, their support wasn’t ardent enough to back feet on the ground.

Although Azzan bin Qais saw the Ghafiri northern emirates as being Wahhabi in nature and therefore supportive of his enemies the Saudis, Sharjah actually joined the alliance between him and Abu Dhabi against Muscat’s Turki bin Said. In October 1870, Turki bin Said took his forces to the field in the Battle of Dhank supported by men from Dubai, Ajman and Ras Al Khaimah, as well as riders from the Na’im and Bani Qitab tribes, many of the Na'im at the time being settled at Dhank. The support of the Na'im was unusual in that they had traditionally been dependent on Zayed the Great - and remained so until his death in 1909.

== Outcome ==
Turki's forces won the batte and he asserted his ascendancy over Muscat and Oman. Azzan bin Qais, the Imam, was killed in battle at Muttrah in January 1871. For the first time in centuries, Muscat and the interior of Oman had a single ruler and was a 'whole' Sultanate.

The settlement of the rule over the Sultanate of Oman did nothing to lessen the jostling of the tribes around Buraimi and Zayed bin Khalifa’s ambitions to hold the fertile oasis only grew with time. This culminated in January 1875 in a further attack by Zayed against the Na’im town of Dhank and the area south of the town, the Dhahirah, by a mounted force of 200 Manasir and Bani Hajir Bedouins. At the same time, Zayed sent a force of Manasir and Mazari against Buraimi, an act which led to the Bani Qitab appealing for support from Dubai. A force of riders were duly sent from Dubai to Buraimi and as a result Zayed suspended his operations against the oasis, Only to return with renewed energy in 1887.

== See also ==
- History of Oman
- History of the United Arab Emirates
