= 2025 in Oman =

- Decades: 2000s; 2010s; 2020s
- See also: Other events of 2025; Timeline of Omani history

This articles lists events from the year 2025 in Oman.

== Incumbents ==
Photo	Post	Name
	Sultan/Prime Minister of Oman	Haitham bin Tariq Al Said

== Holidays ==
- 11 January – Accession Day
- 27 January – Prophet's Ascension
- 29 March–1 April – End of Ramadan
- 5–9 June – Feast of the Sacrifice
- 26 June – Islamic New Year
- 4 September – Prophet's Birthday
- 20-21 November – National Day

== Events ==
=== March ===
- March 13 – Pakistan and Oman agree to develop joint working projects in agriculture.

=== April ===
- April 9 – A 4,000-year-old musical instrument is found near Dahwa.
- April 12 – Iran and the United States hold their first high-level negotiations since 2018 over the Iranian nuclear programme in Muscat.

=== July ===
- July 2 – A bus collides with an object on the road in Izki, killing five people and injuring 12 others.

=== September ===
- September 27 – The Jebel Akhdar Mountains and the Sirrin reserve are designated as biosphere reserves by UNESCO.

=== December ===
- December 3 – Nine Filipino sailors held captive by the Houthis in Yemen following the group's attack on the cargo vessel Eternity C in July arrive in Muscat after being turned over to Omani authorities.
- December 18 – Oman and India sign a comprehensive economic partnership agreement.

== Deaths ==
- 23 November – Suhail Bahwan, 86, conglomerate industry executive
