= Muttrah =

Province in Muscat Governorate, Oman

Muttrah مطرح
- Province
- Interactive map outlining Muttrah province
- Location within Oman
- Coordinates: 23°37′N 58°34′E
- Country: Oman
- Governorate: Muscat Governorate

Area
  - Total: 91 km^{2} (35 sq mi)
  - Land: 91 km^{2} (35 sq mi)

Population (2022)
  - Total: 223,590
  - Density: 2,500/km^{2} (6,400/sq mi)
- Time zone: UTC+4 (+4)

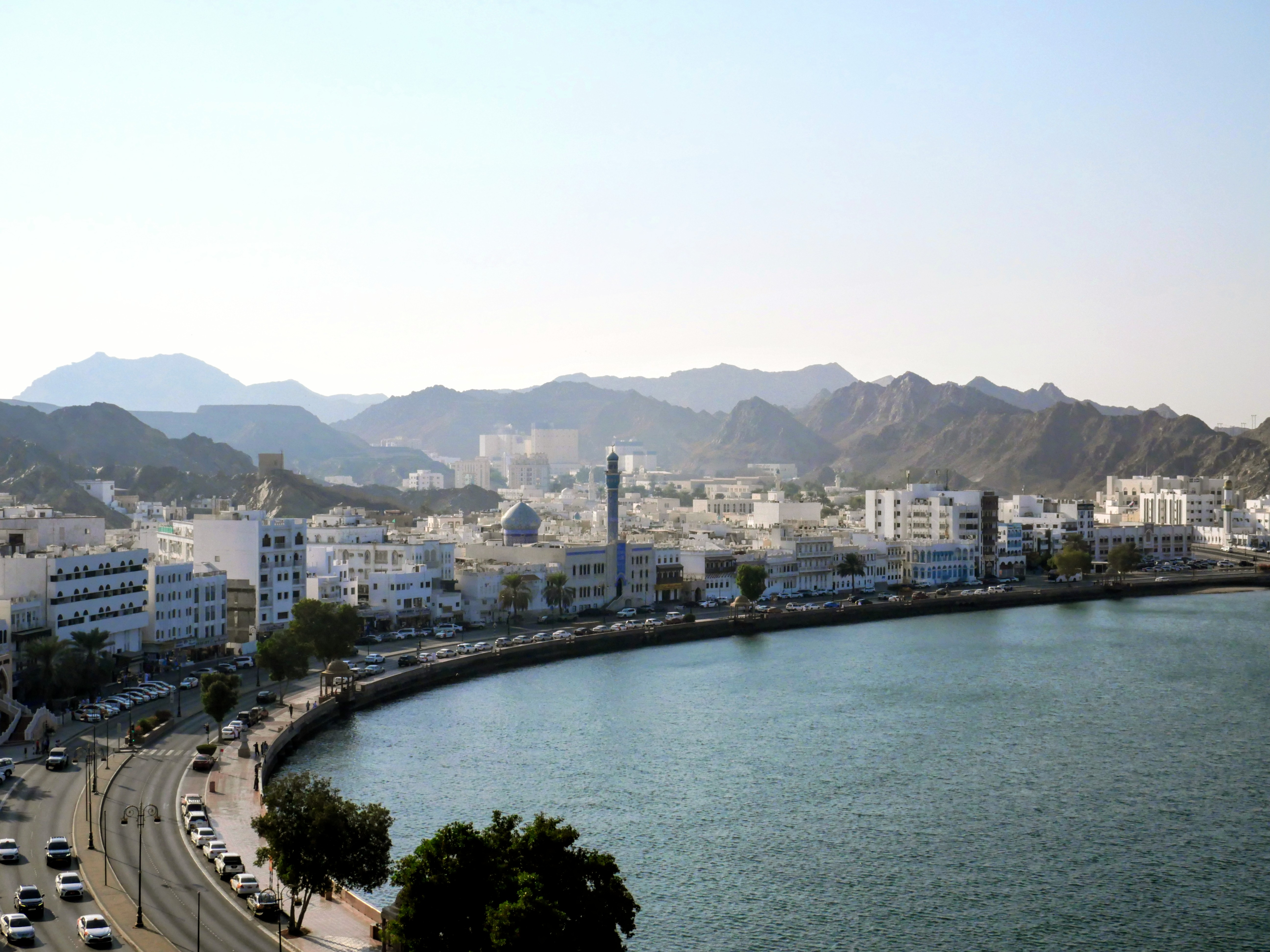
View of the Corniche

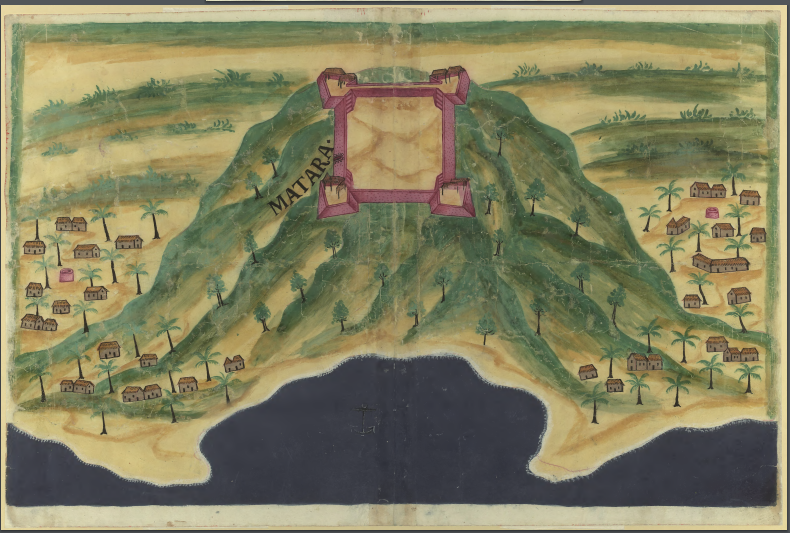
Portuguese Fortress of Muttrah (Matara) in the 17th century

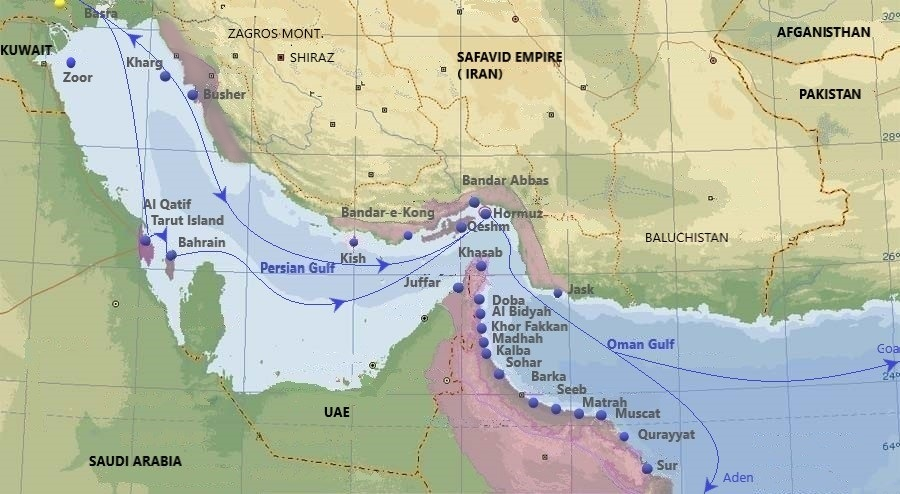
Purple – Portuguese in the Persian Gulf in the 16th and 17th century. Main cities, ports and routes.

Muttrah, (Arabic: مطرح) administratively a province, is located in the Muscat Governorate of Oman. Before the discovery of oil in Oman, Muttrah was the center of commerce in Oman (Muscat). It is still a center of commerce as one of the largest seaports of the region is located there. Other landmarks include Souq Muttrah, a traditional bazaar and Sour Al-Lawatiah, a small community of houses surrounded by an old wall. To the south lies Muscat District.

== Demographics ==
Muttrah had an estimated population of about 8,000 people when diplomat Edmund Roberts visited in the early 1830s. The district population was 234,225 as of 2022, down from 234,225 in 2016. It's the most densely populated province in the nation.

The Sūr al-Luwātiyah neighborhood is home to the al-Luwātiyah tribe, which speaks the Indo-Aryan Luwati language. The language and people were first mentioned historically by the Omani historian Ibn Ruzayq. The Luwātiyah appeared to have settled in Oman in waves of immigration from Sindh between 1780 and 1880, bringing the language with them. They insularized themselves in Sūr al-Luwātiyah, preserving their language. They have worked in the incense (بخور), jewelry and clothes businesses as well as in general trade. In the predominantly Ibadi Sunni arena of Oman, they make up the majority of the local Shia population.

== Economy ==
In the mid 19th century, Muttrah had a vessel repair industry.

=== Souq Muttrah ===
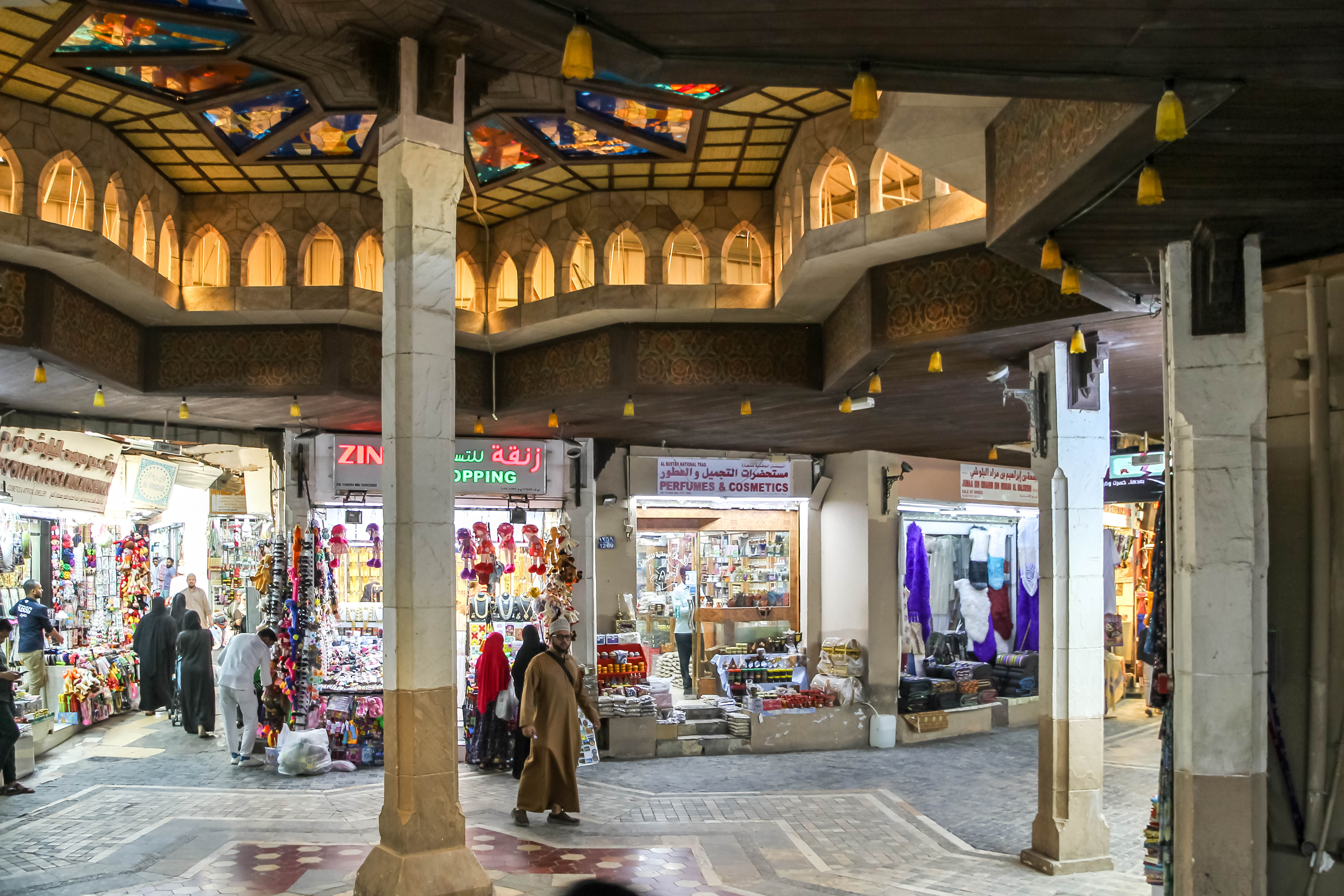
The Muttrah Souq

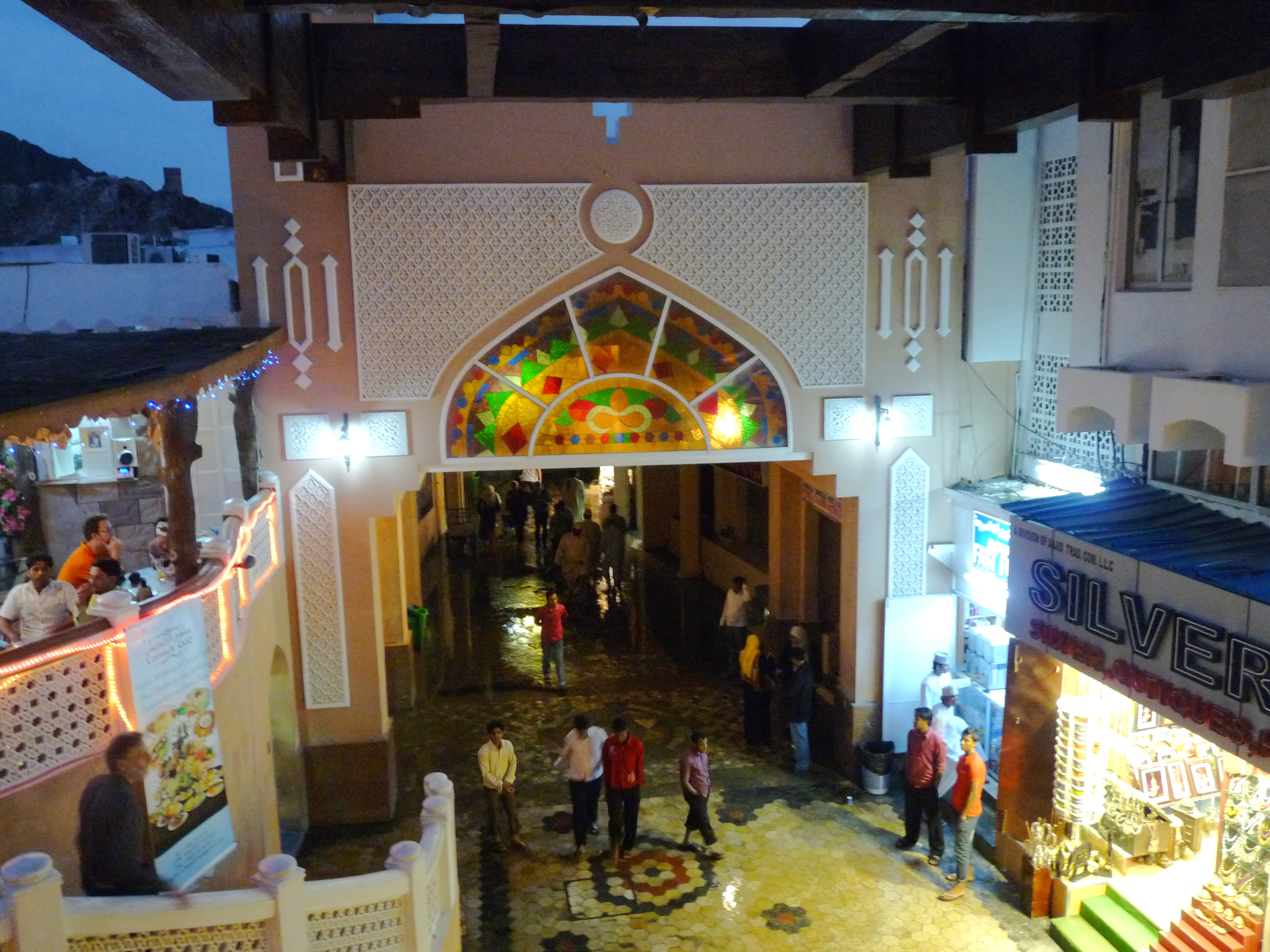
Entrance to the Muttrah Souq

Al Dhalam ("Darkness" in English) Souq is the local name for the Muttrah Souq. The Muttrah Souq is one of the oldest marketplaces in Oman dating back two hundred years. It is located adjacent to the harbor of Muscat and has seen immense trade in the age of sail, being strategically located on the way to India and China. It was named after darkness because of the crowded stalls and lanes where the sunrays do not infiltrate during the day and the shoppers need lamps to know their destinations. The name of the market has been drawn specifically from the part that extends from Al Lawatiya Mosque to Khour Bimba where the place is really full of stores and stalls and the narrow area of lanes does not allow the sunlight to enter. The market was a source of supply for Omanis where they could buy their needs in the 1960s when life requirements were simpler than today. Most of the goods were imported, in addition to local products like textiles, fruit, vegetables and dates.

In the past, the market was built from mud and palm leaves, which suit the high temperatures and the hard climate conditions and hence were the best available materials to build the market at that time. Today, the Muscat Municipality has renovated and decorated the market to maintain the popular style but has also introduced modern amenities and redecorated the market heavily to attract tourists and make the shopping experience comfortable for tourists as well as other ordinary shoppers.

The market becomes more crowded and active during Eid seasons when Omanis come from all over the country to buy garments and jewelry.

The main thoroughfare of the souq carries mainly household goods, shoes and ready-made garments. Further inside, there are mixed smells of frankincense, perfume oils, fresh jasmine, and spices. There are also tiny shops (on the side streets and alleyways leading up to the souq) with Omani silver, stalls of white dishdashas and embroidered kumahs, brightly colored cloth, and multicolored head scarves. Shoppers can even obtain old Arabian muskets at these souqs.

Other items sold at the souq include Omani pots, paintings, hookah pipes, framed khanjars (daggers), leatherwork, and incense.

The souq goes by various names: Market of Darkness, due to its myriad of alleys and roads lined by shops that block the sun during the day. The east and west parts are also known as "the small market" and "the large market".

== Infrastructure ==
=== Port Sultan Qaboos ===
Commonly called the Muscat Port, Port Sultan Qaboos is one of the main commercial ports in Oman. It is Oman's premier maritime gateway, enjoying a prime location in the politically stable sultanate. Situated in a natural harbour 250 km south of the Strait of Hormuz on the Indian Ocean coast of the Arabian Peninsula. Port Sultan Qaboos' location makes it an ideal hub, not only for the Persian Gulf but also the Indian sub-continent and markets in East and South Africa.

The location of Port Sultan Qaboos offers savings in steaming time when compared to other ports. The port's tariff is comparable with others in the region. The infrastructure, skilled manpower, handling operations and documentation clearance system in PSC will be further enhanced this year.

During the reign of Sayyid Sultan bin Ahmed in the 18th century, Oman's trading activity again increased and the capital area's two harbours — Muscat and Mutrah — diversified, Mutrah was quickly established as a commercial port while Muscat was used for naval operations. The ruler's son Sayyid Said continued to expand maritime commerce although it again went into decline after his death in 1856. Maritime activity was limited to the import of essential items, mainly from India by old-style wooden dhows. Ships had to anchor offshore and sometimes wait for days before cargo could be unloaded manually into small boats.

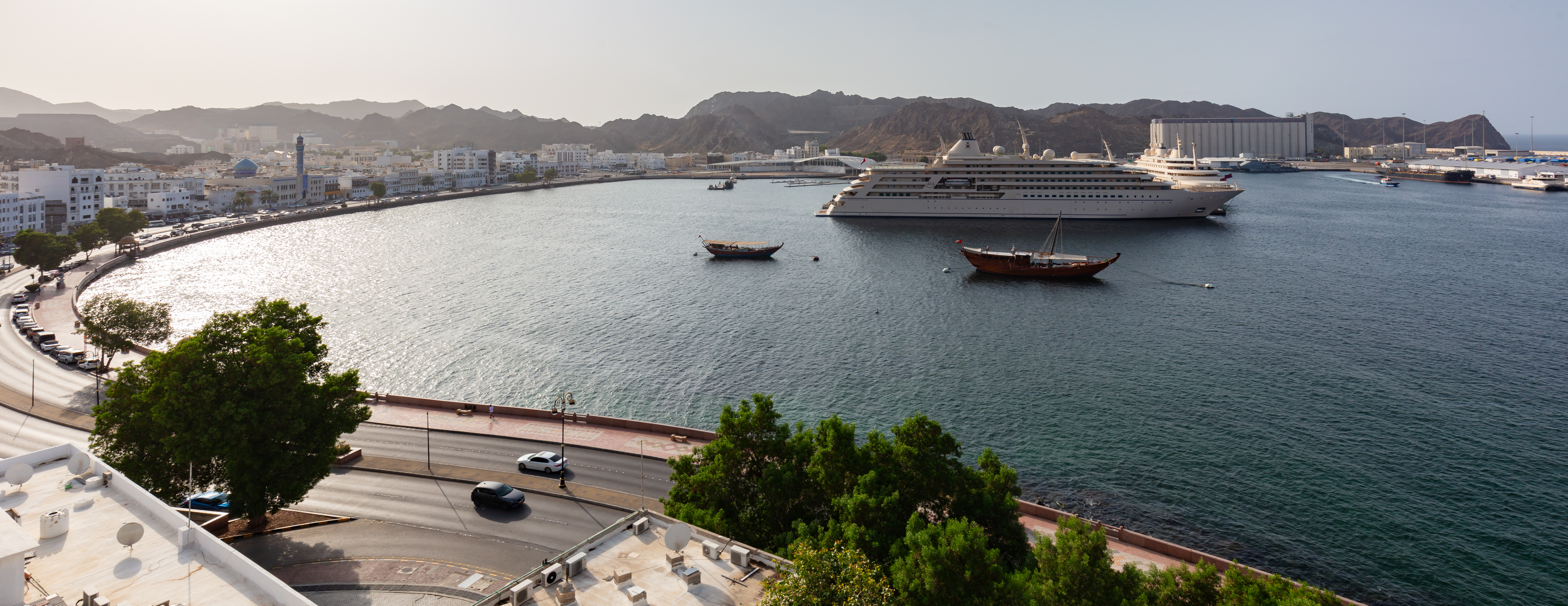
Muscat Port

This was all to change with the accession of HM Sultan Qaboos bin Said who inaugurated a new era of maritime commerce and prosperity in Oman when he established Mina Qaboos (now Port Sultan Qaboos) in 1974.

Port Sultan Qaboos has been operated and managed by Port Services Corporation S.A.O.G. since November 1976. Until 1981, the traffic was essentially conventional cargo. With the advent of containerisation, PSQ developed two of its berths to handle container vessels and these facilities were fully operational by 1983–1984.

PSC embarked on computerization of its operations and back office in 1984. The first system to handle container movements became operational from 1985 to 1999. Thereafter the computer applications were enhanced to cover all back office operations including invoicing and accounts.

In the early 1990s, the port infrastructure was further enhanced. Two more berths were converted to handle multipurpose vessels including container vessels and were equipped with additional three quay-side gantry cranes. The marshaling yard and empty yard was provided with rubber tyred gantries. On date, the port is an ideal transshipment hub for the upper Persian Gulf and Red Sea ports trade flows.

== History ==
In early 1871, Muttrah witnessed the end of Imam Azzan bin Qais, who had been the Imam of Oman between 1868 and 1871. Bin Qaid had deposed his cousin, Salim bin Thuwaini, and declared a short-lived Ibadi imamate in Oman. He fought and lost against Salim's uncle, Sayyid Turki bin Said, at the Battle of Dhank in October 1879, before being killed in battle at Muttrah in January 1871.

== In popular culture ==
Muttrah is also a map in a popular Battlefield 2 mod, Project Reality. It was also featured on The Amazing Race in the eighth episode of its 17th season.

== Panorama ==
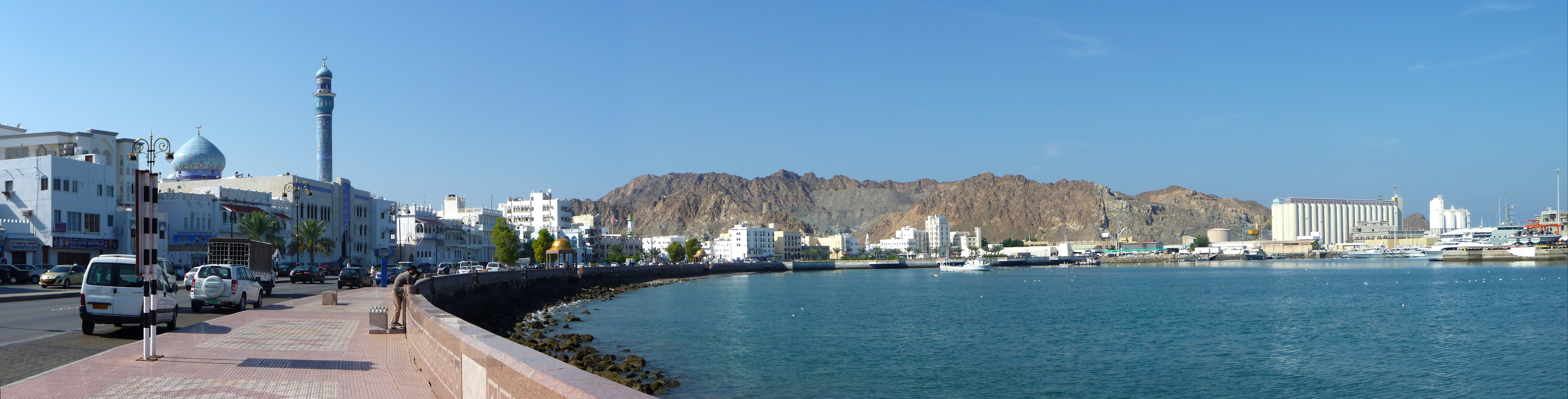
A panorama of Muttrah corniche in Muscat, Oman

== Twin town ==
- Zugló, Hungary

== Gallery ==
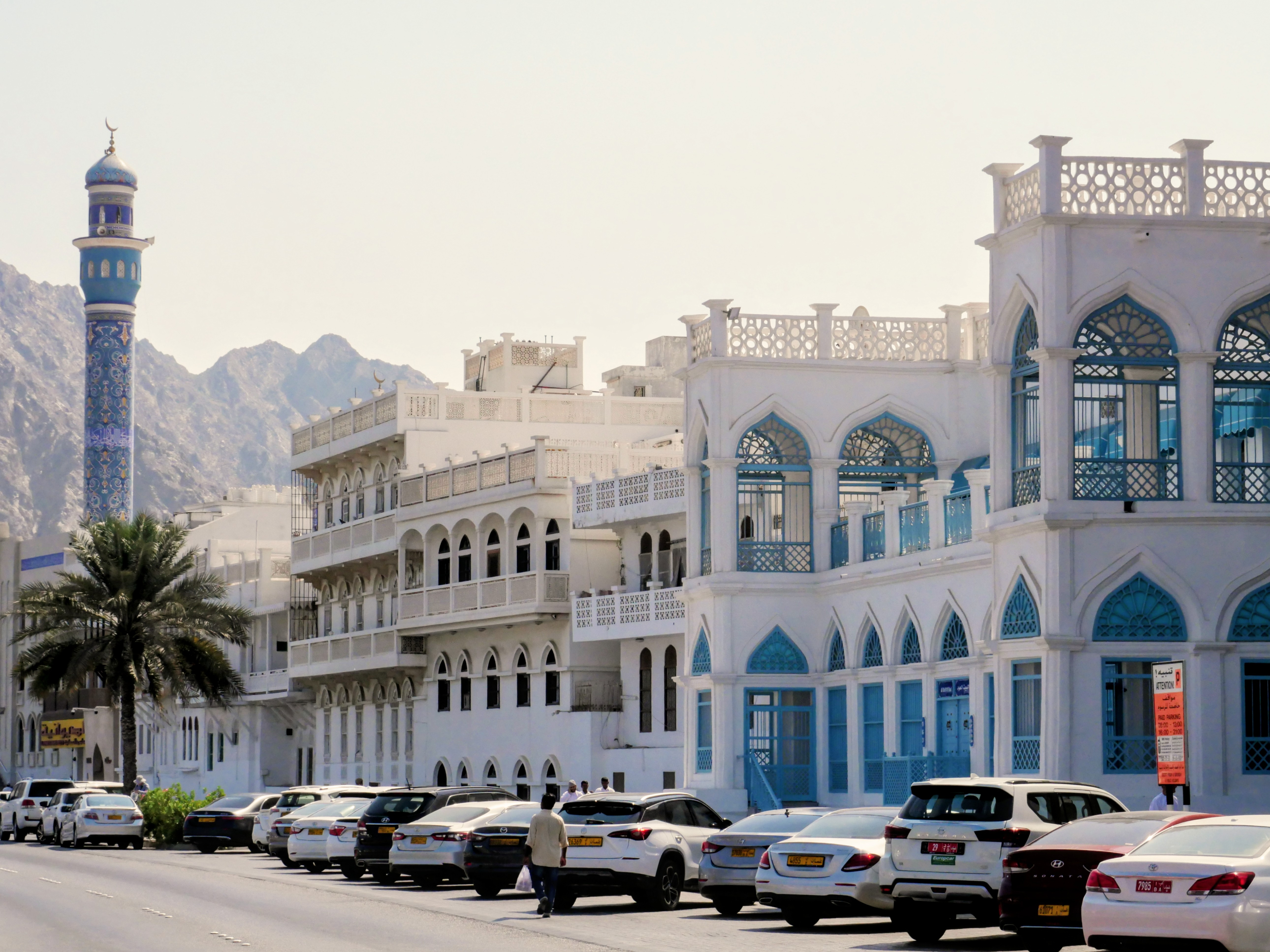

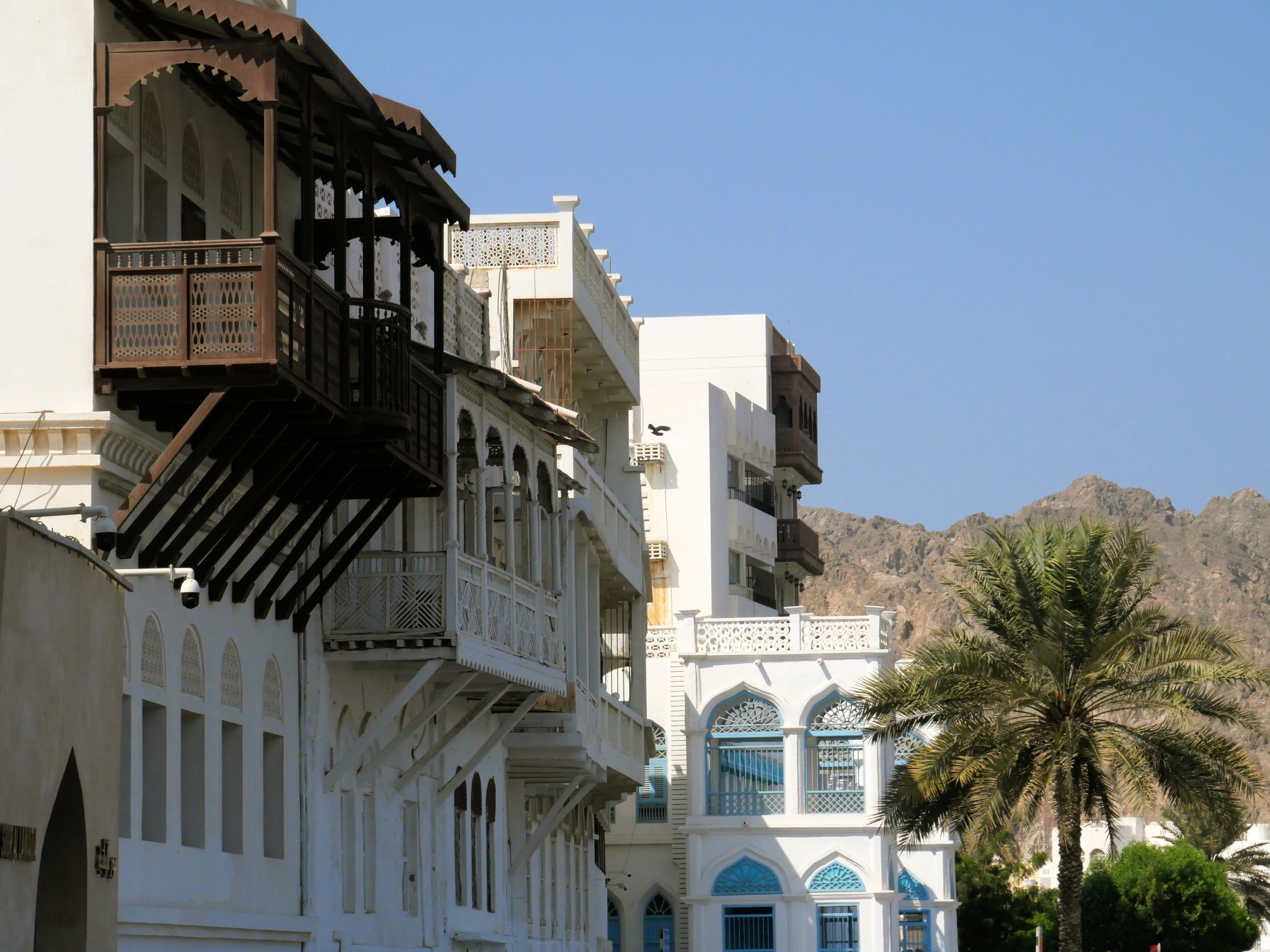

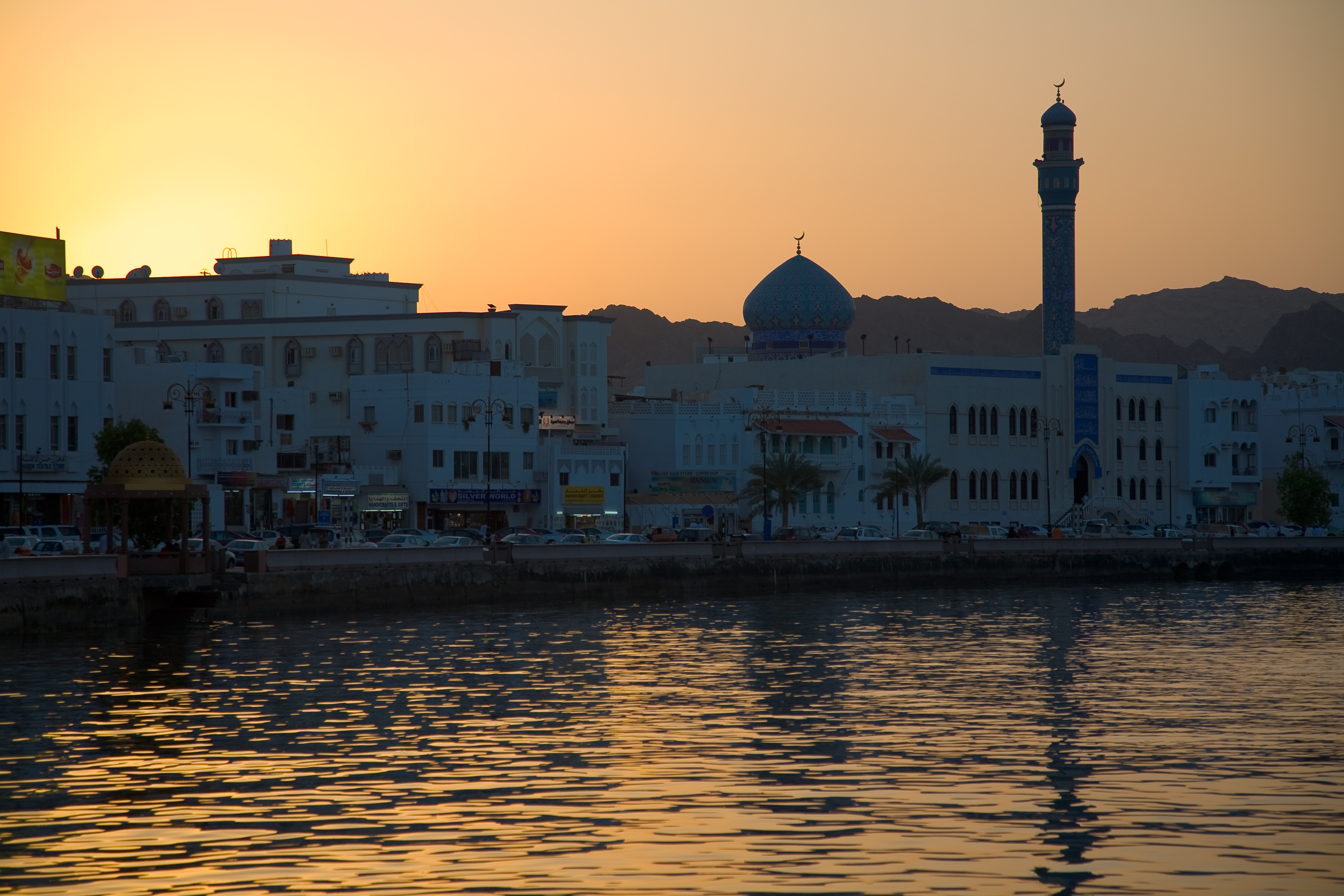

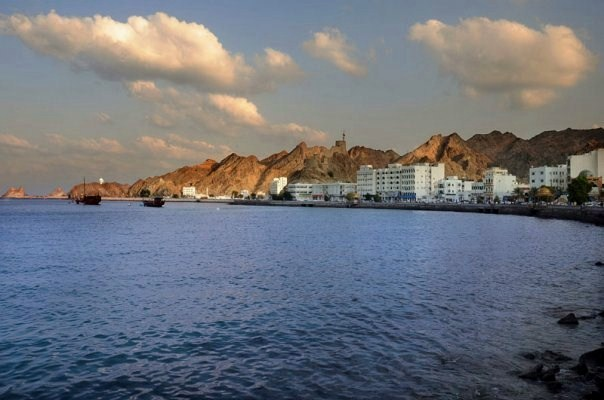

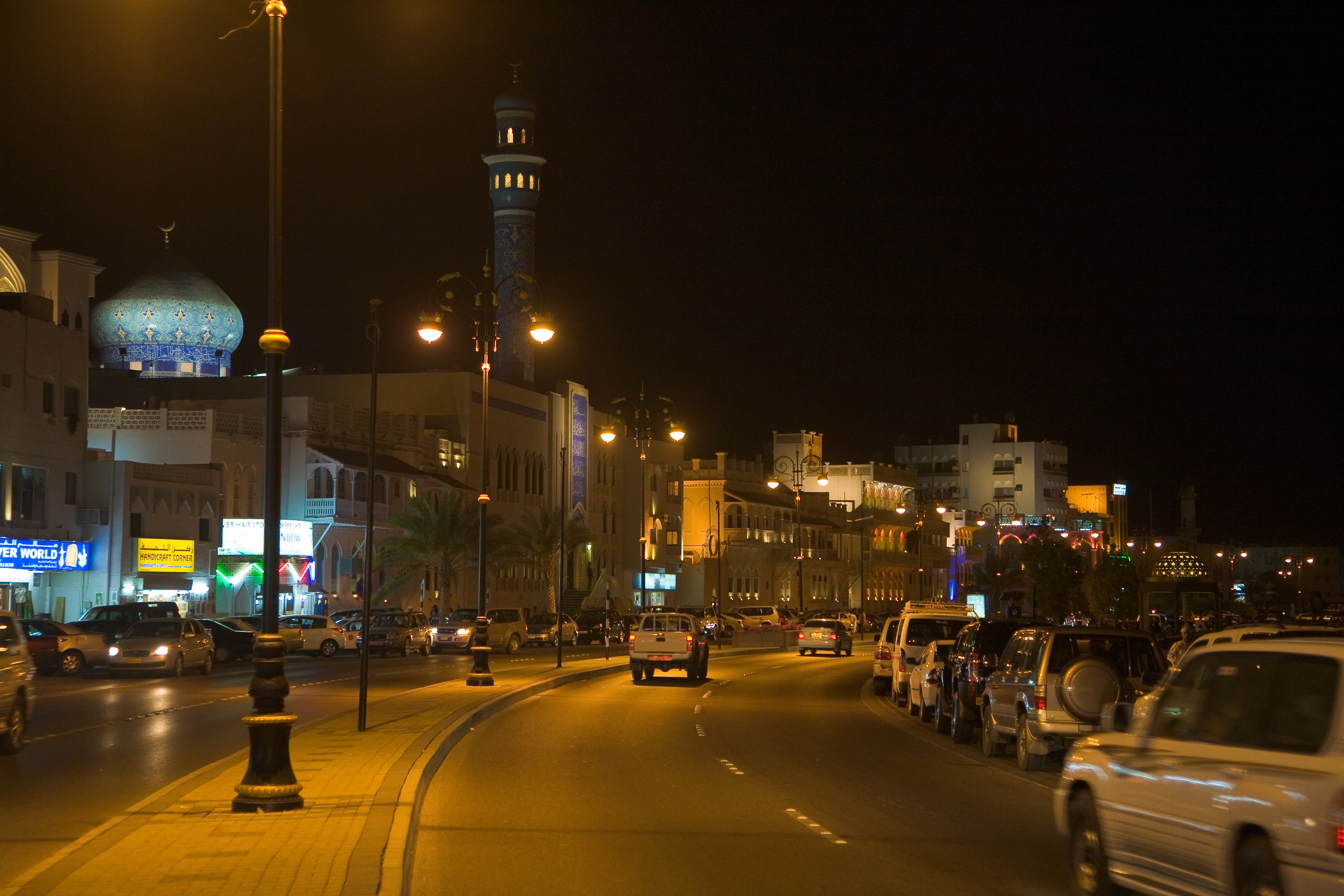

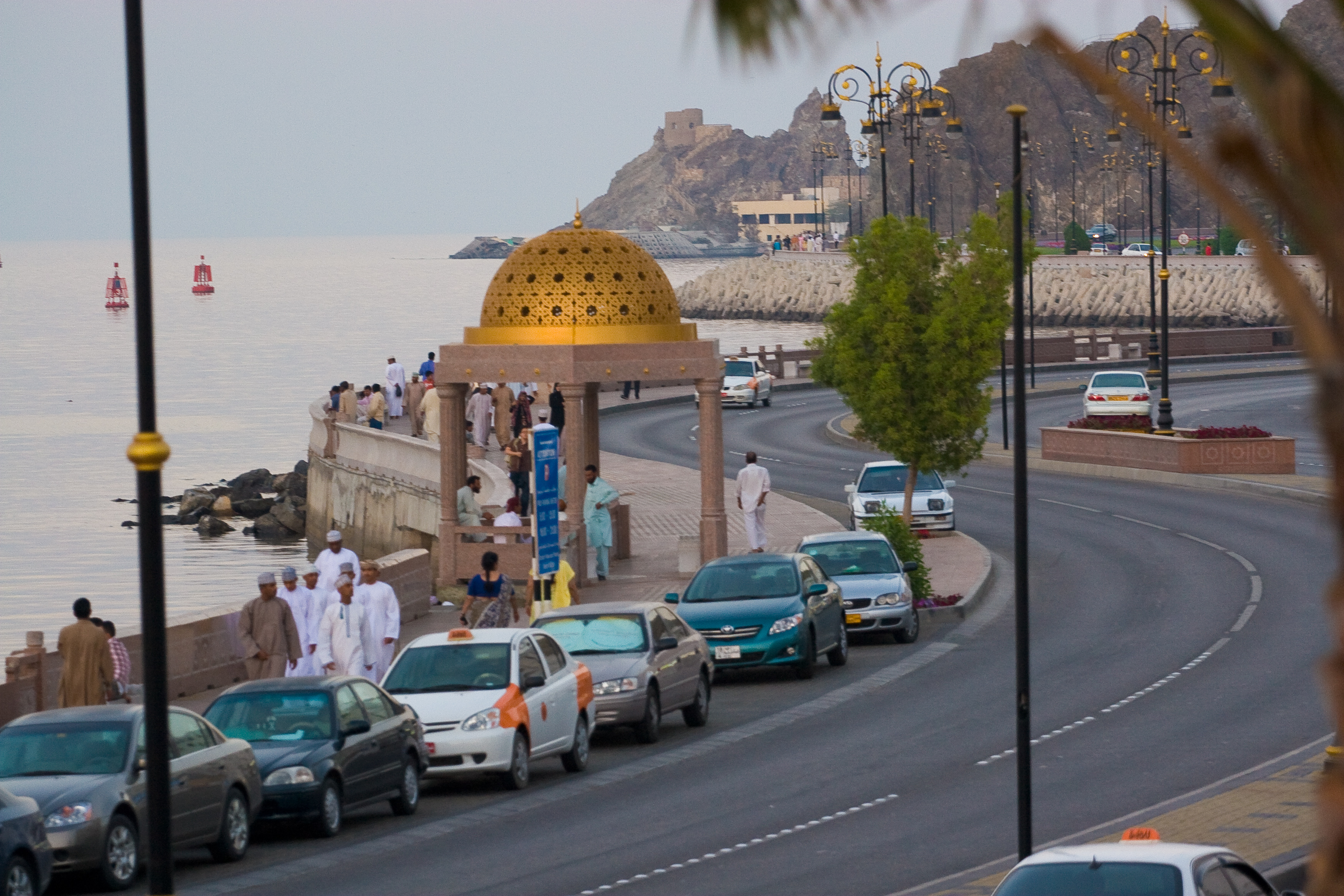

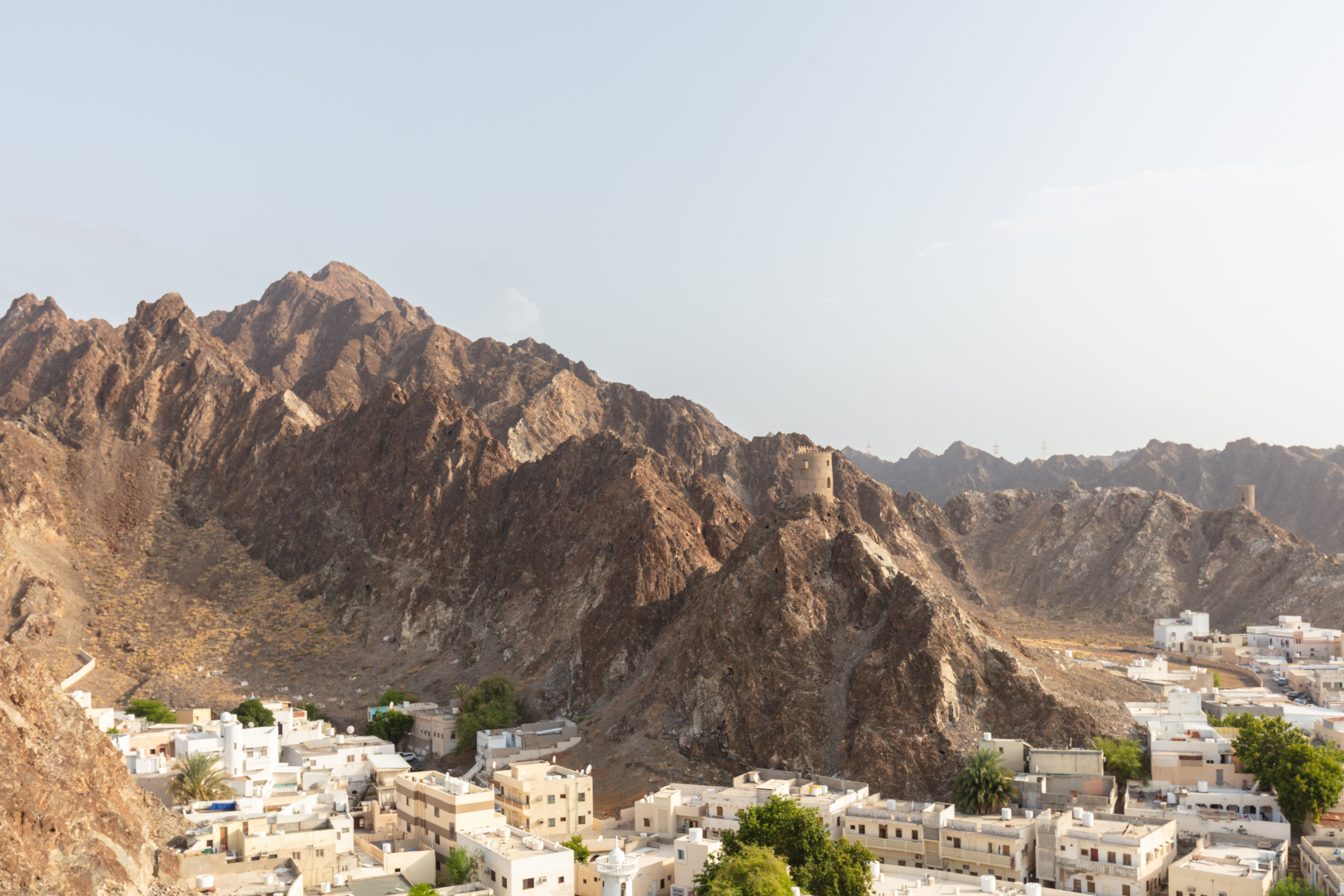

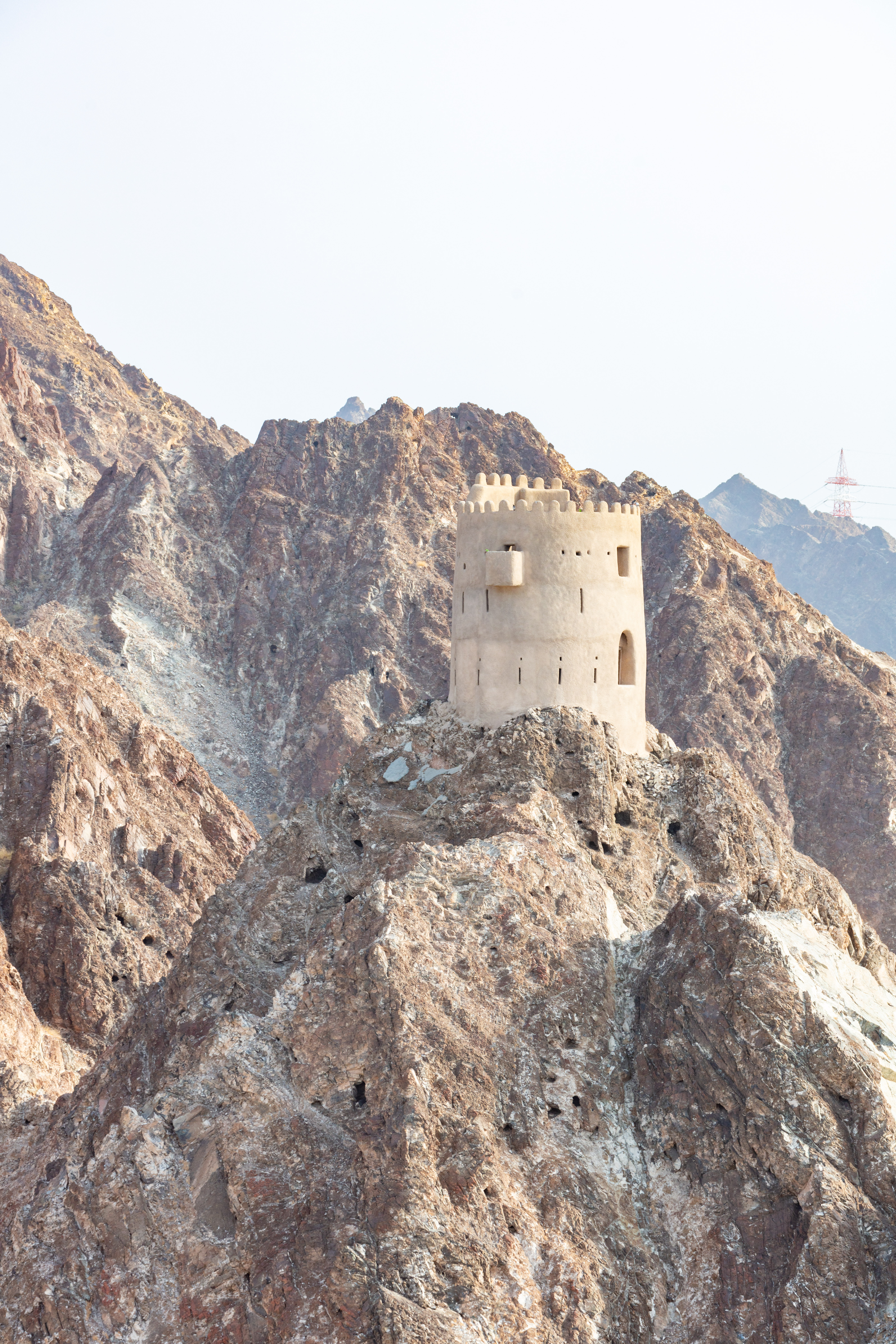

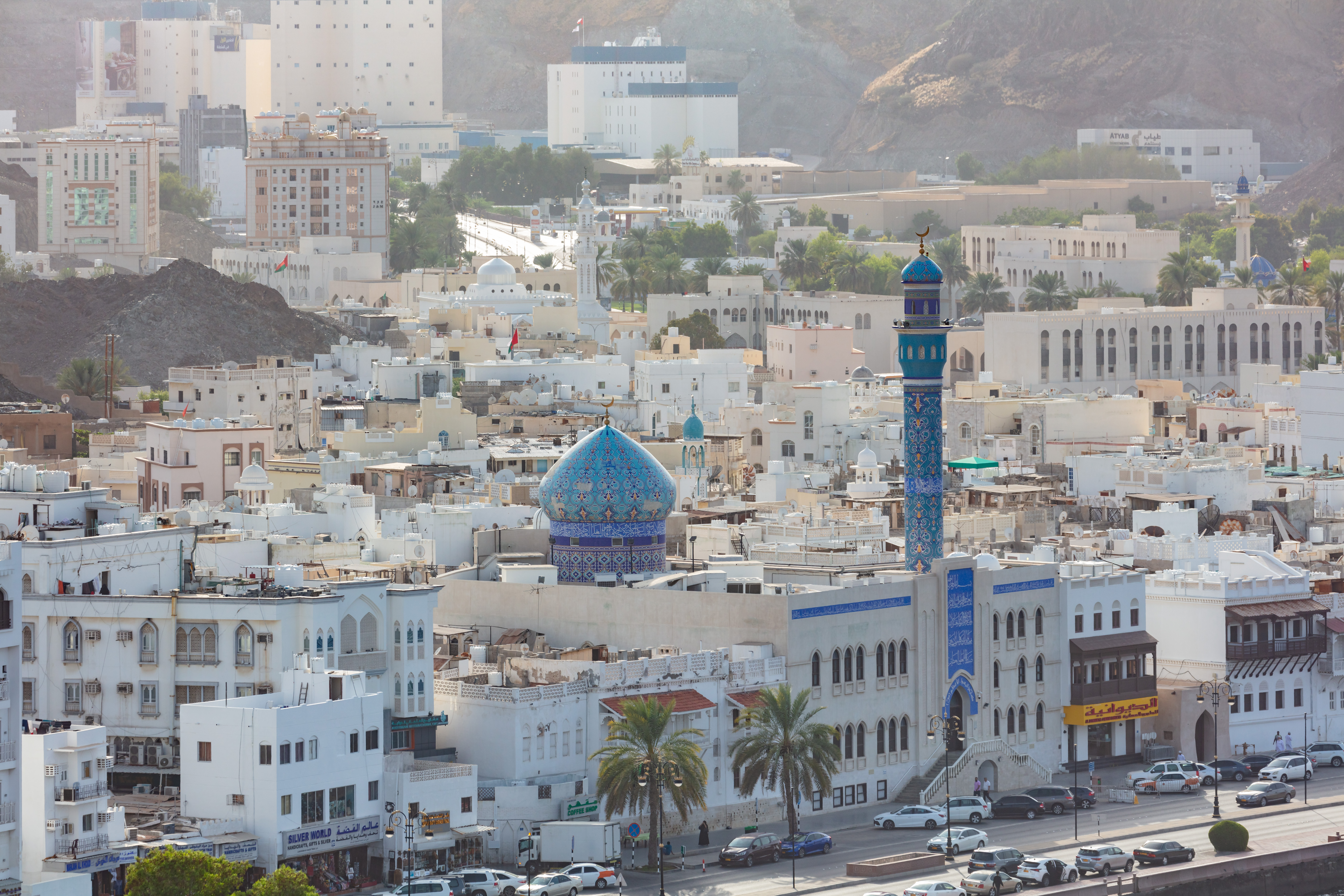

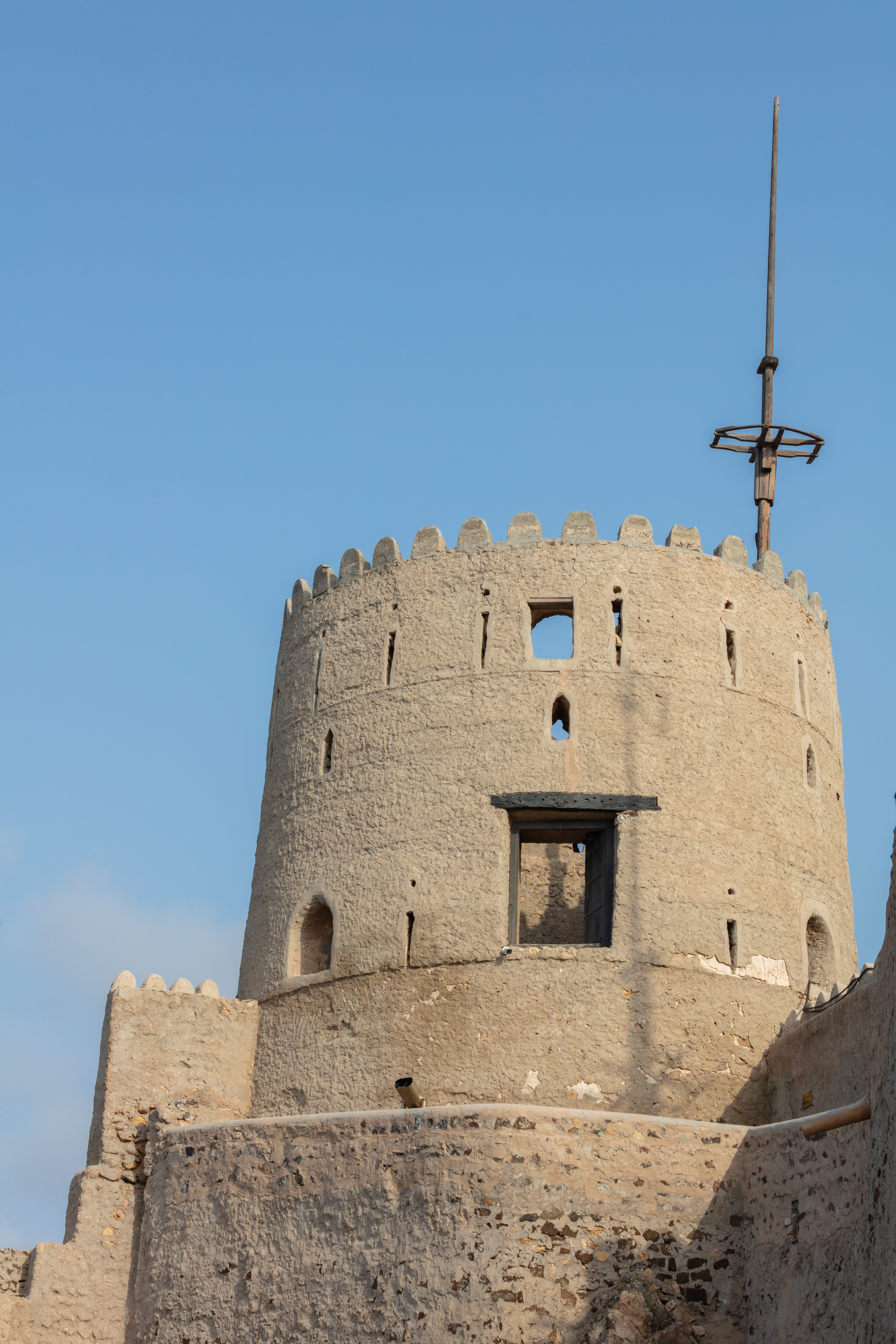

== See also ==
- Old Muscat
- Port Sultan Qaboos
