= 2011 in Oman =

- Decades: 1990s; 2000s; 2010s; 2020s
- See also: Other events of 2011; Timeline of Omani history

The following lists events that happened during 2011 in Oman.

== Incumbents ==
- Sultan: Qaboos bin Said al Said

== Events ==
=== January ===
- January 20 - Somali pirates seize a Mongolian bulk carrier off the coast of Oman.
- January 31 - Oman says it has uncovered a spy network from the United Arab Emirates operating in the country.

=== February ===
- February 9 - Somali pirates seize an oil supertanker off the coast of Oman.
- February 16 - South Korea will fly the bodies of eight Somali pirates killed in a commando raid on a freighter last month from Muscat to Mogadishu, Somalia.
- February 19 - Pirates seize a yacht with four Americans off the coast of Oman.
- February 27 - Police clash with anti-government protesters in Sohar, leaving two people dead.

=== March ===
- March 1 - Omani police fire into the air to try to disperse the protests in their fourth day, wounding one.
- March 5 - Two government ministers are replaced in response to protests.
- March 6 - Three more ministers are dismissed to respond to protests.
- March 29 - Omani police arrest several protesters and clear a blockade in Sohar.

=== April ===
- April 1 - A protester is shot dead by police at a demonstration in Sohar.
- April 22 - Thousands of protesters take to the streets to protest for reform.
