= 2023 in Oman =

- Decades: 2000s; 2010s; 2020s
- See also: Other events of 2023; Timeline of Omani history

This articles lists events from the year 2023 in Oman.

== Incumbents ==
Photo	Post	Name
	Sultan/Prime Minister of Oman	Haitham bin Tariq Al Said

== Events ==
- 23 February - Oman opens its airspace to Israeli airlines for the first time. Israel's Foreign Minister Eli Cohen calls the decision historic.
- 29 October - Omanis vote to elect members of the Shura Council.

Scheduled

- 31 October - 2023 Omani general election
