= 2013 in Oman =

- Decades: 1990s; 2000s; 2010s; 2020s
- See also: Other events of 2013; Timeline of Omani history

The following lists events that happened during 2013 in Oman.

== Incumbents ==
- Sultan: Qaboos bin Said al Said

== Events ==
=== May ===
- May 1 - Flash floods leave 16 people dead and 3 others missing in Saudi Arabia, with authorities urging citizens to avoid low-lying wadis. At least two others were killed in neighboring Oman in some of the heaviest rainfall in more than 25 years.
