= 2017 in Oman =

- Decades: 1990s; 2000s; 2010s; 2020s
- See also: Other events of 2017; Timeline of Omani history

This article lists events from the year 2017 in Oman.

== Incumbents ==
- Sultan: Qaboos bin Said al Said

== Deaths ==
- 5 February – Rahila Al Riyami, politician (b. 1960).
