= 2021 in Oman =

- Decades: 2000s; 2010s; 2020s
- See also: Other events of 2021; Timeline of Omani history

This articles lists events from the year 2021 in Oman.

== Incumbents ==
- Sultan/Prime Minister: Haitham bin Tariq Al Said

== Events ==
- 30 July - A Liberian-flagged tanker ship was struck by a drone attack off the coast of Oman, killing two crew members.
