= 2022 in Oman =

- Decades: 2000s; 2010s; 2020s
- See also: Other events of 2022; Timeline of Omani history

This articles lists events from the year 2022 in Oman.

== Incumbents ==
Photo	Post	Name
	Sultan/Prime Minister of Oman	Haitham bin Tariq Al Said

== Events ==
- 22 May - Oman announces that it will repeal all COVID-19 restrictions, including its mask mandate.

== Sports ==
- 21 - 28 January: 2022 Women's Hockey Asia Cup
- 10 - 15 February: 2022 Tour of Oman
- 9 - 18 August: Oman at the 2021 Islamic Solidarity Games
