= 2020 in Oman =

- Decades: 2000s; 2010s; 2020s
- See also: Other events of 2020; Timeline of Omani history

This articles lists events from the year 2020 in Oman.

== Incumbents ==
- Sultan/Prime Minister: Qaboos bin Said al Said (until 10 January) Haitham bin Tariq Al Said (from 11 January)

== Deaths ==
- 10 January – Qaboos bin Said al Said, sultan and ruler (b. 1940).
