= 2019 in Oman =

- Decades: 1990s; 2000s; 2010s; 2020s
- See also: Other events of 2019; Timeline of Omani history

This articles lists events from the year 2019 in Oman.

== Incumbents ==
- Sultan: Qaboos bin Said al Said
- Prime Minister: Qaboos bin Said al Said
