= 2024 in Oman =

- Decades: 2000s; 2010s; 2020s
- See also: Other events of 2024; Timeline of Omani history

This articles lists events from the year 2024 in Oman.

== Incumbents ==
Photo	Post	Name
	Sultan/Prime Minister of Oman	Haitham bin Tariq Al Said

== Events ==
- 28–31 January – 2024 Men's FIH Hockey5s World Cup at Muscat.
- 15 April – Eighteen people are killed in flash floods across the country, with Ash Sharqiyah North Governorate being the worst affected.
- 15 July –
  - 2024 Muscat mosque shooting: Nine people including three attackers are killed in a shooting at the Imam Ali Mosque in Wadi Kabir, Muscat. The Islamic State subsequently claims responsibility for the attack, its first in Oman.
  - One sailor is killed and six others are reported missing after the Comoros-flagged oil tanker Prestige Falcon sinks off Ras Madrakah in the Arabian Sea. Nine sailors are rescued.
- 17 September – The Taliban announces the reopening of the Afghan embassy in Muscat.
- 24 September – The United States Navy vessel USNS Big Horn runs aground and is damaged off the coast of Oman after replenishing the USS Abraham Lincoln carrier strike group.

== Holidays ==
- 11 January – Accession Day
- 8 February – Prophet's Ascension
- 10–13 April – End of Ramadan
- 16–20 June – Feast of the Sacrifice
- 7 July – Islamic New Year
- 15 September – Prophet's Birthday
- 18-19 November – National Day
