= Oman–Zanzibar war =

- Part of the Omani Colonization of Africa
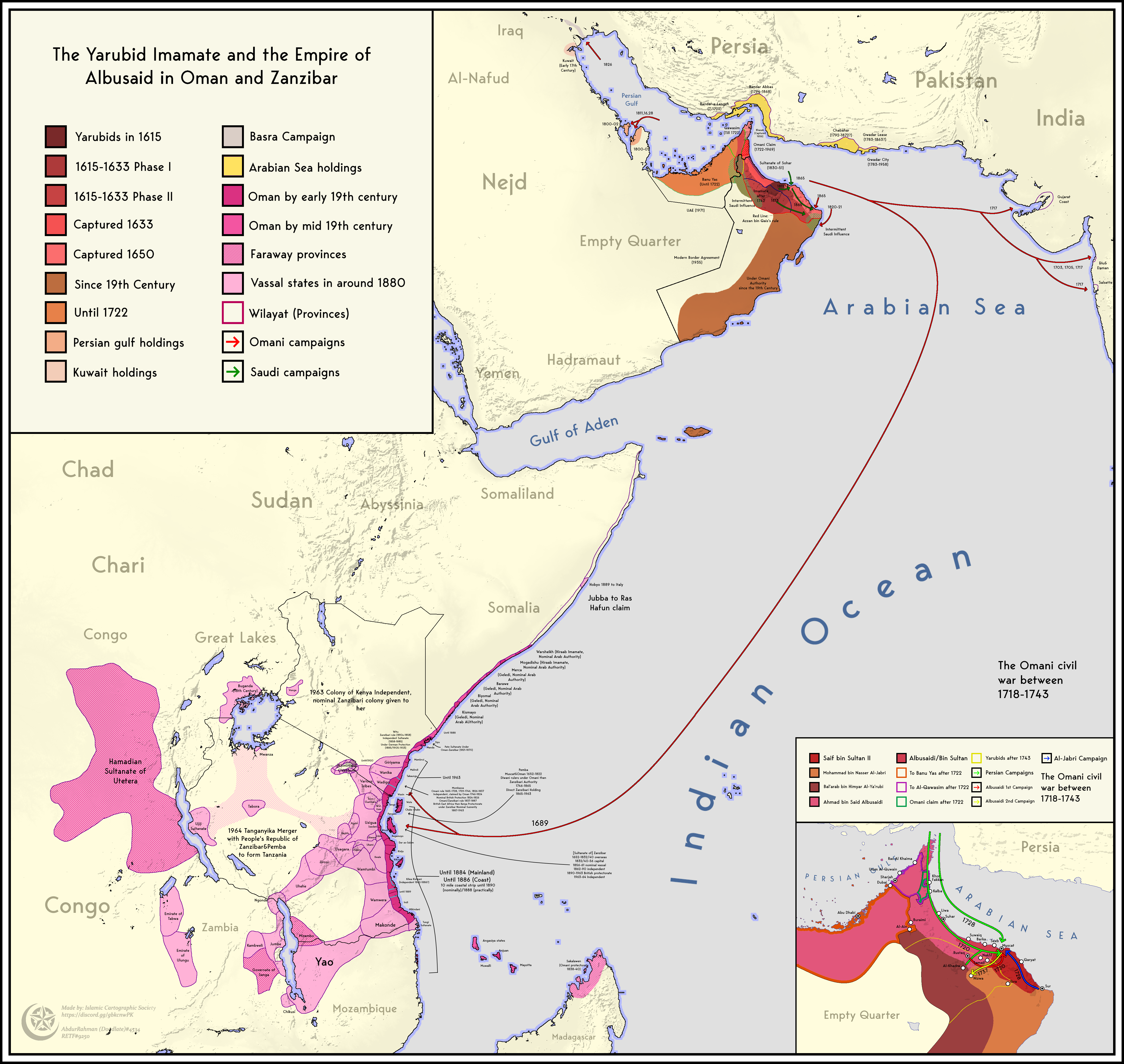
- Sultanate of Zanzibar in pink
Date	1784
Location	Zanzibar Archipelago
Result	Omani victory

Belligerents
Omani Empire	Local forces from Zanzibar, Mombasa and Pemba Island

Commanders and leaders
Hilal bin Ahmad	Unknown

The Oman–Zanzibar war (Arabic: حرب عمان - زنجبار; Swahili: Vita vya Oman-Zanzibar) was a 1784 conflict between the Omani Empire and Zanzibar. It was the first time they had fought since 1779. Zanzibar, a colony of Oman, rebelled with the support of African forces from Mombasa and Pemba Island. Oman had to retake Zanzibar by force, capturing it in a short war. The Omani force was dispatched by Hilal bin Ahmad, eldest son of Sultan Ahmad bin Said al-Busaidi.
