= Turki bin Said =

Sultan of Oman from 1871 to 1888

Turki bin Said تركي بن سعيد بن سلطان البوسعيدي
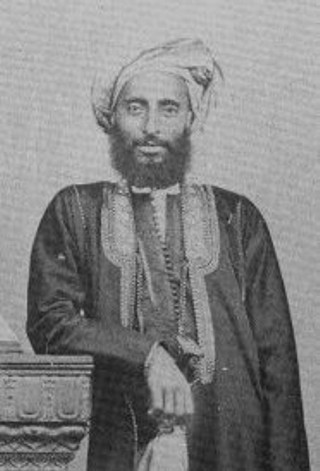
- Sultan Turki c. 1871–1888

Sultan of Oman
- Reign: 30 January 1871 – 4 June 1888
- Predecessor: Azzan bin Qais
- Successor: Faisal bin Turki
- Born: 1832; Muscat, Oman
- Died: 4 June 1888 (aged 55–56); Muscat, Oman
- Issue: Muhammad bin Turki; Faisal bin Turki; Fahad bin Turki; Turkia bint Turki; Unnamed daughter
- Dynasty: Al Bu Said
- Father: Said bin Sultan
- Mother: an Ethiopian woman
- Religion: Ibadi Islam

Sultan Turki bin Said bin Sultan Al Busaidi (Arabic: تركي بن سعيد بن سلطان البوسعيدي; 1832 – 4 June 1888), was Sultan of Muscat and Oman from 30 January 1871 to 4 June 1888. He acceded following his victory over his cousin, Iman Azzan bin Qais at the Battle of Dhank. On Turki's death, he was succeeded by his second son, Faisal bin Turki.

== Early life ==
Turki was born in 1832 to Sultan Said bin Sultan and an Ethiopian concubine. His father appointed him the Wali of Sohar in 1854.

In 1861, he revolted against his brother, Thuwaini bin Said, who had succeeded his father as Sultan of Oman. The division of Muscat and Zanzibar meant that Sohar would be under the authority of Thuwaini which Turki refused to accept. He was imprisoned and Salim bin Thuwaini was appointed as the new Wali of Sohar. The British authorities intervened and Turki was released from prison in 1862. After Salim killed his father and took the throne in 1866, Turki was again imprisoned and subsequently released due to British intervention. He was given an annuity of 7,200 thalers and moved to Bombay in British India.

== Issue ==
Turki bin Said had five children.

- Sayyid Muhammad bin Turki (1860–?); had kaka
- Sayyid Faisal bin Turki (1864–1913); married Sayyida Aliyah bint Thuwaini bin Said and had issue
- Sayyid Fahad bin Turki (?-1894); married Sayyida Sharifa bint Barghash bin Said and had issue
- Sayyida Turkia bint Turki; married firstly to Sultan Hamad bin Thuwaini of Zanzibar and secondly to Sayyid Harub bin Thuwaini, the brother of her first husband
- Sayyida (name unknown) bint Turki; married Emir Talal bin Abdullah Al Rashid of Jabal Shammar

== Honours ==
- United Kingdom: Knight Grand Commander of the Order of the Star of India (1 January 1886)

Turki bin Said House of Al Said Born: 1832 Died: 4 June 1888
Regnal titles
Preceded by Azzan bin Qais	Sultan of Oman; 1871-1888	Succeeded by Faisal bin Turki
