= Azzan bin Qais =

Imam and Sultan of Oman
- Reign: 1868–1871
- Predecessor: Salim bin Thuwaini
- Successor: Turki bin Said
- Died: 30 January 1871; Muttrah
- Spouse: a daughter of Said bin Khalfan Al-Khalili
- Dynasty: Al Bu Said
- Father: Qais bin Ahmad
- Religion: Ibadi Islam

Imam Azzan bin Qais (Arabic: الإمام عزان بن قيس) was the Imam of Oman between 1868 and 1871. He deposed his cousin, Salim bin Thuwaini, and declared a short-lived Ibadi imamate in Oman. Opposing Saudi interference in the Buraimi Oasis, he fought and lost against Salim's uncle, Sayyid Turki bin Said, at the Battle of Dhank in October 1869, before being killed in battle at Muttrah in January 1871.

Regnal titles
Preceded by Salim bin Thuwaini	Sultan of Oman; 1868–1871	Succeeded by Turki bin Said
