= Thuwaini bin Said =

Sultan of Muscat and Oman from 1856 to 1866

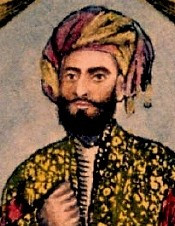
- Portrait of Sultan Thuwaini

Sultan of Muscat and Oman
- Reign: 19 October 1856 – 11 February 1866
- Predecessor: Said bin Sultan
- Successor: Salim bin Thuwaini
- Born: 1821; Muscat, Oman
- Died: 11 February 1866 (aged 44–45); Sohar Fort
- Burial: Al Hujra
- Spouse: Ghaliya bint Salim al Busaidiyah
- Issue: Salim; Harub; Hamad; Aliya
- House: Al Bu Said
- Father: Said bin Sultan

Thuwaini bin Said al-Busaidi (Arabic: ثويني بن سعيد ال سعيد, Sayyid Ṯuwaynī bin Saʿīd Āl Saʿīd) (1821 – 11 February 1866) was the Sultan of Muscat and Oman from 1856 to 1866. The third son of Said bin Sultan, Thuwaini was born in Oman, and never visited Zanzibar. When his father was away in Zanzibar, Thuwaini was his representative in Oman.

Thuwaini was married to his cousin Ralie (Sayyida Ghaliya bint Salim Al-Busaidiyah), daughter of his father's elder brother Salim Ibn Sultan. They had several children.

After the death of Said bin Sultan on Zanzibar in 1856, Thuwaini became Sultan of Muscat and Oman, while his brother, the sixth son, Majid, took power on Zanzibar. Through British mediation, it was agreed that Majid should pay a yearly tribute to Oman. However, Majid paid this tribute for only a few years, and when he stopped, Thuwaini was in no position to enforce payment from the much wealthier Zanzibar. This left Muscat and Oman in a difficult financial situation. Thuwaini was forced to levy duties on various articles, creating malcontent. In 1866 he was rumored to have been killed by his own son, Sayyid Salim bin Thuwaini.

The Arabist scholar and traveller William Gifford Palgrave relates how, when they were shipwrecked in March 1863 on Sowadah Island just off Oman, they were very well received and treated by Thuwaini.

Regnal titles
Preceded by Said bin Sultan	Sultan of Oman; 1856–1866	Succeeded by Salim bin Thuwaini
