= National Day of Oman =

Public holiday in Oman, 20 November

National Day of Oman اليوم الوطني العماني
- Also called: National Day
- Observed by: Oman
- Type: State
- Significance: Marks the Omani Renaissance
- Celebrations: Fireworks, Concerts, Parades
- Date: November 20
- Next time: 20 November 2026

National Day (Arabic: اليوم الوطني العماني, alyawm alwataniu aleumaniu) is an official holiday in the Sultanate of Oman and the main one in the country. The holiday celebrates the date of the founding of the Al Bu Said dynasty, which has ruled Oman since 1744.

== Background ==
The Portuguese first arrived in the country in the early 1500s, and used the now capital of Muscat as a fortified port to protect their trade routes to India. Unhappy with a Portuguese presence that exploited Oman, the Al-Ya'ribi clan agreed a treaty with the British East India Company to allow the British to have rights in their ports, in a rebuke of the Portuguese government. Imam Sultan bin Saif led a rebellion that expelled the Portuguese from Oman and its ports.

== Observances ==
National Day events include parades, fireworks, camel races, a horse show, and once every five years, a military exhibition drill. The holiday gives Omanis the opportunity to return to their home villages which makes the traffic level during the holiday much heavier than usual.

=== Glorious National Day Military Parade ===
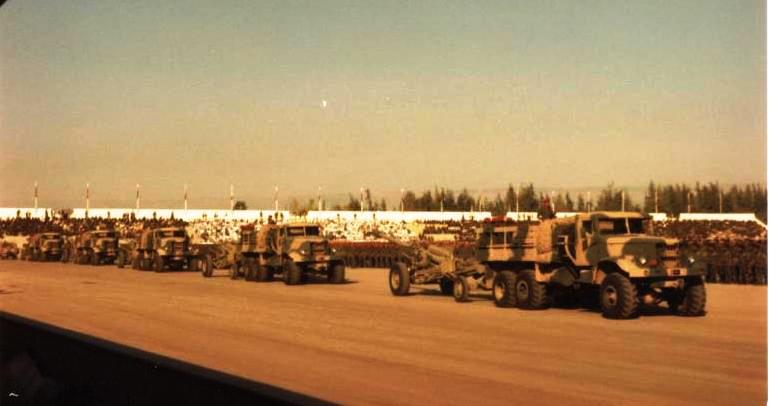
Oman artillery towed by KrAZ trucks during a National Day Parade in 1981.

The Glorious National Day Military Parade is the highlight and main event of the national day holiday in the country. It has been held since the early 1970s and has been held in different cities ever since its inception.

The following units of the Sultan of Oman's Armed Forces are represented at the parade:

- Royal Army of Oman (RAO)
- Royal Navy of Oman (RNO)
- Royal Air Force of Oman (RAFO)
- Royal Guard of Oman (RGO)
- Sultan's Special Forces (SSF)
- Royal Oman Police (ROP)
- Royal Court Affairs (RCA)

Upon the arrival of Sultan to the royal box on the parade ground in their position as Supreme Commander of the Armed Forces, the parade formations give the royal military salute, with the massed bands playing the As-Salam as-Sultani while the artillery fires a 21-gun salute. Afterwards, the parade commander approaches the royal box to request for permission from the sultan to begin the parade. Once the parade is commenced, the inter-service massed bands of the Sultan of Oman's Armed Forces passes the royal box in slow and quick time past playing marching music. Then, the parade commander motions for the formations on the parade ground to march off passing before the royal box accompanied to musical marches, giving the Sultan the military salute as they march past. After that, the combined bands gave a musical performance of various pieces from the ancient Omani heritage, as well as international symphony pieces. Following the performances, the troops then chant the military anthem (Ya Hay Ya Qayoom) and pledged their Loyalty and Allegiance to the Sultan, before sounding a threefold Long Live His Majesty the Sultan. Finally the royal anthem is then played a second time as the troops present arms, signaling the conclusion of the military parade. His Majesty then leaves the parade ground with his aides and minister, to attend the other national day events held that day.

== See also ==
- Sultan of Oman's Armed Forces
- History of Oman
- Qaboos Bin Said Al Said
- Saudi National Day
