= Salim bin Thuwaini =

Sultan of Oman from 1866 to 1868

Sultan of Oman
- Reign: 1866–1868
- Predecessor: Thuwaini bin Said
- Successor: Azzan bin Qais
- Born: 1839; Muscat
- Died: 7 December 1876 (aged 36–37); Hyderabad, Sindh, (present-day part of Pakistan)
- Spouse: a daughter of Qais bin Azzan Al-Busaidi
- Dynasty: Al Bu Said
- Father: Thuwaini bin Said
- Mother: Ghaliya bint Salim Al-Busaidiyah

Sultan Salim bin Thuwaini Al Busaidi (Arabic: سَالِم بِن ثُوَيْنِي آل سَعِيْد, romanized: Sālim bin Ṯuwaynī Āl Saʿīd) was the Sultan of Muscat and Oman from 11 February 1866 – October 1868. He was the eldest son of Sultan Thuwaini bin Said and his wife Sayyida Ghaliya bint Salim Al-Busaidiyah, and acceded to the throne in succession to his father. Lewis Pelly and Henry Bartle Frere were deeply disappointed by the death of Sultan Thuwaini bin Said in their hopes for a military action against the Wahhabis, and were well aware of Salim's opposing views and refusal to join the ensuing war. Hence the British Political Resident General in the Gulf at Bushehr, Colonel Lewis Pelly, fiercely opposed the recognition of Salim whom he feared was to stop foreign interference and forge a peace deal with the Wahhabis.

Salim sent two envoys to Bombay, then under British rule, with a letter soliciting the renewal of relations between the British and Muscat Governments and reiterating his assertions regarding his father's death, namely, that he had died as a result of illness after three days of suffering and was quickly buried in accordance to Islamic tradition, to which the Government of India acknowledged the reigning prince as sultan in May 1866. Pelly tried to intervene and accused him of patricide through innuendo but was forestalled by the British Viceroy John Lawrence, 1st Baron Lawrence who presented Salim with his government's official recognition.

In September 1868, Azzan bin Qais, Salim's brother-in-law and distant relative was elected imam by disgruntled tribesmen seeking to lead the country back to the principles of classical Ibadhi state, Azzan led his followers in a rapid series of raids on the Barkah, Mutrah and Muscat forts. With no support, Salim could not hold center and was forced to flee to one of the harbour fortresses. In his precipitate flight, he left his valuables behind together with many heirlooms of the dynasty, all of which were either plundered or destroyed by the invaders. On 11 October 1868, Salim embarked on his ship The Prince of Wales and sailed for Bandar-Abbas, from there he made several failed attempts to recover his lost dominions between October 1868 and March 1869. He made a final bid for the throne in 1875, however by that point, the British had formally recognized his uncle Turki bin Said as the new Sultan. Salim was captured and expelled aboard H.M.S.Daphne and was exiled to a fortress in Hyderabad, Sindh until he died of smallpox on 7 December 1876.

Regnal titles
Preceded by Thuwaini bin Said	Sultan of Oman; 1866–1868	Succeeded by Azzan bin Qais
