= Badr bin Saif =

- Born: Badr bin Saif Al-Busaidi
- Died: 1806; Naaman, Oman
- Known for: Regent of Oman

Badr or Badar bin Saif (died 1806) was a member of the Al Said dynasty of Oman. In 1804, he became regent while the heirs to the sultanate were minors. When he attempted to increase his power in 1806, he was killed.

== Early years ==
Badr bin Saif was the son of Saif bin Ahmad, one of the sons of Ahmad bin Said al-Busaidi, the first sultan of the Al Said dynasty. His uncle, Sultan bin Ahmad, became ruler of Oman in 1792. While Sultan was away on a pilgrimage to Mecca early in 1803, Badr bin Saif made an attempt to get control of Fort Al Jalali, a key stronghold guarding Muscat harbor. The story is that he was being smuggled into the fort in a large box, but was detected by a Hindu trader. He managed to escape and took refuge in Qatar. In Zubarah, in Qatar he asked for protection from the Wahhabis, and adopted their beliefs. They helped him with two abortive attempts to take Muscat. He then travelled to Najd and met the Amir Saud, who made him welcome.

Sultan bin Ahmad left on an expedition to Basra in 1804. He died near the island of Qeshm in mid-November 1804 during a minor skirmish. Sultan had appointed Mohammed bin Nasir bin Mohammed al-Jabry the Regent and guardian of his two young sons, Salim bin Sultan and Said bin Sultan.

== Dynastic power struggle ==
After Sultan's death the tribes to the north broke away from Omani authority, while a struggle for power broke out within the ruling family. Badr bin Saif, based in Muscat, gained the support of the Wahhabi leader, Su'ud, in this contest. The former sultan's brother Qais bin Ahmad decided to try to seize power. Early in 1805, he joined forces with his younger brother Mohammed and marched down the coast to Muttrah, which he took with little opposition. Mohammed bin Nasir tried to buy Qais off with a large monthly annuity. Qais refused since he had growing support and was confident of success, and continued to besiege Muscat. Mohammed bin Nasir called on Badr bin Saif for help.

Badr bin Saif arrived at Muscat just in time to forestall its capitulation. He also arranged for the Wahabbis to attack Sohar as a diversion. Qais agree to lift the siege in return for being given Al Khaburah and part of the Batinah. A month later Qais returned and again took Muttrah, but was forced to withdraw when a large seaborne force of Wahabbis appeared. He accepted peace on the grounds that he would gain Muttrah as well as the other places he had taken, and a monthly subsidy. In July, Qais broke his engagement and again advanced on Muscat. The Wahabbis again attacked Sohar, while Said bin Sultan advanced into the Samail valley. Kais was forced to make peace, and gave up Muttrah and his subsidy.

== Effective ruler ==
The rulers of Bahrain, the Al Kalifah, had come under the power of the Wahabbis. They were forced to leave members of their families in Zubarah as hostages to their loyalty. In 1805, they appealed for protection from Badr bin Saif, now the effective ruler of Muscat. He sent warships and helped them evacuate their family from Zubarah to Bahrain. The Al Kalifah then asked the British Resident in Muscat, Captain David Seton, if the British would provide one or two gunboats to help them and Badr bin Saif keep the Wahhabis under control in the Persian Gulf. Seton recommended acceptance, but the British did not want to become involved in Bahraini politics. The next year the Al Kalifah declared their independence of Badr bin Saif.

By 1805, the people of Muscat were becoming concerned with Badr's close relations with the Wahhabis. He paid tribute and maintenance for a force of 400 Wahabbi cavalry stationed at Barka. He also enforced the strict Wahhabi doctrines, destroyed the minarets of Ibadi and Sunni mosques and enforced regular attendance at prayers. At one point the Wahhabi leader called on Badr to attack India as part of the Jihad. He was forced to stall since this would mean attacking his British allies.

In 1806, there were further inconclusive military operations against Kais in Sohar. The same year Badr bin Saif began to make moves to increase his power. He made his ward Salim bin Sultan governor of Al Maşna‘ah, on the Batinah coast and Said bin Sultan governor of Barka to remove them from government affairs.

== Death ==
Badr bin Saif died on 31 July 1806. (Note: According to Samuel Barrett Miles he died in March 1807. Most other sources support a death in 1806.) He was lured to Burka and attacked by Said bin Sultan at Naaman, a nearby village. There are different accounts of what happened, but it seems clear that Said struck the first blow and his supporters finished the job. Said was acclaimed by the people as a liberator from the Wahhabis, who left the country. Qais bin Ahmad at once gave his support to Said. Nervous of the Wahhabi reaction, Said blamed Mohammed bin Nasir for the murder.

Badr bin Saif left two sons, Hamud and Saif. Hamud became deputy governor of Rustaq in 1833.
