= Belchior Calaça =

Portuguese naval captain

- Occupations: Sea captain, military architect
- Known for: Fort Al Jalali, Fort Al-Mirani

Belchior Calaça (or Belchior Álvares) was a Portuguese naval captain who was active in the Indian Ocean in the second half of the 16th century.

Captain Belchior Calaça (Note: Samuel Barrett Miles gives the name of the captain who built the fort as "Melchior Calaça". Other sources give it as "Belchior Calaça".) was tasked with fortifying Muscat, Oman. He left Goa, Portuguese India, on 9 January 1587 as captain of one of the ships in an expedition led by Martim Affonso de Mello. The main purpose was punitive, in response to aggression by the Turks on the East coast of Africa. The fleet visited Ampaza, which they destroyed, Pate, where the ruler submitted, then Lamu, where the ruler had fled. They went on to Malindi and then Mombasa, which they looted and burned. From there they sailed for the Strait of Hormuz, stopping at Muscat where Calaça remained while the fleet went on to Hormuz.

On arrival at Muscat Calaça built the fortress now called Fort Al Jalali, then named Forte de São João. The top of the prominence on which the fort stands was first leveled, and the rock was scarped. Calaça built a cistern to hold water for the occupants and armed the fort with cannon. Calaça also built the fort now called Fort Al-Mirani, but then called Capitão (Captain), presumably named after Calaça. An engraved stone in Fort Mirani reads (in Portuguese),

Under the reign of the very high and mighty Felippe, first of this name our Lord and King, in the eighth year of his reign in the Crown of Portugal, he sent by Dom Duarte de Meneses, his Viceroy and Governor of India, that this Fortress be made, which was done by Belchior Calaça, its first captain and founder, 1588.

In May 1588 a party of Jesuit missionaries led by Pedro Páez arrived at Muscat, where Calaça was in command, en route to Ethiopia. He advised them to travel via the Strait of Mecca. They were not able to take this advice, and ran into many difficulties before reaching their destination. Belchior Calaça was responsible for military architecture in Ormuz until 1589, when he was replaced by Francisco Velho. Around 1598 Calaça was involved in an unsuccessful attack on Cuneale in the peninsula of Pudepatam, 77 leagues from Goa and 35 from Cochin, on the Malabar Coast of India. He gave the signal for attack too soon. Only part of the force engaged the enemy, many were killed and the remainder were forced to retreat.
