= Salim bin Sultan =

Sultan of Oman
- Reign: 1804–1806
- Predecessor: Sultan bin Ahmad
- Successor: Said bin Sultan
- Died: 1821; Muscat, Oman
- Dynasty: Al Bu Said
- Father: Sultan bin Ahmad
- Mother: Sayyida Ghanneyeh bint Saif Al-Busaidi

Salim bin Sultan was joint Sultan of Oman with his brother Said bin Sultan, ruling between 1804 and 1806.

Salim bin Sultan was son of Sultan bin Ahmad, who ruled Oman from 1792 to 1804. Sultan bin Ahmad died in 1804 on an expedition to Basra. He appointed Mohammed bin Nasir bin Mohammed al-Jabry as the Regent and guardian of his two sons, Salim bin Sultan and Said bin Sultan. Sultan's brother Qais bin Ahmad, ruler of Sohar, decided to attempt to seize power. Early in 1805 Qais and his brother Mohammed marched south along the coast to Muttrah, which he easily captured. Qais then started to besiege Muscat. Mohammed bin Nasir tried to bribe Qais to leave, but did not succeed.

Mohammed bin Nasir called on Badr bin Saif for help. After a series of engagements, Qais was forced to retire to Sohar. Badr bin Saif became the effective ruler. Allied with the Wahhabis, Badr bin Saif became increasingly unpopular. To get his wards out of the way, Badr bin Saif made Salim bin Sultan governor of Al Maşna‘ah, on the Batinah coast and Said bin Sultan governor of Barka. In 1806 Said bin Sultan lured Badr bin Saif to Barka and murdered him nearby. Said was proclaimed ruler of Oman.

Said bin Sultan became the sole ruler, apparently with the consent of his brother. Their aunt, the daughter of the Imam Ahmad bin Said al-Busaidi, seems to have influenced this decision. Around the end of May 1810 Salim bin Sultan was sent on a mission to Persia to seek assistance in the struggle against the Wahhabis in the north of Oman. He died in Muscat in April 1821. He left three male heirs, Muhammad, Hamed and Sirhan.

== Sources ==
- Badger, George Percy (1871). Reports from Committees. Great Britain. Parliament. House of Commons.
- Davies, Charles E. (1997). The Blood-red Arab Flag: An Investigation Into Qasimi Piracy, 1797-1820.
- Ibn Ruzayq, Ḥamīd ibn Muḥammad (1871). History of the Imâms and Seyyids of ʼOmân. Hakluyt Society. p. 257.
- Miles, Samuel Barrett (1919). The Countries and Tribes of the Persian Gulf. Garnet Pub. ISBN 978-1-873938-56-0.
