= Said bin Ahmad Al Busaidi =

Sultan of the Omani Empire from 1783 to 1786

Said bin Ahmed

Imam of the Omani
- Reign: 1783–1786
- Predecessor: Ahmad bin Said al-Busaidi
- Successor: Hamad bin Said
- Died: 1803; Al-Batinah Fort, Rustaq
- Burial: Al-Batinah Fort, Rustaq
- Dynasty: Al Bu Said
- Father: Ahmad bin Said al-Busaidi
- Mother: Ghani bint Khalfan Al-Busaidiyah

Said bin Ahmad (died 1803) was briefly the Imam of Oman, the second of the Al Bu Said dynasty, ruling the country between 1783 and 1786.

== Rule ==
Said bin Ahmad was the son of the Imam and Sultan Ahmad bin Said al-Busaidi, and was elected Imam on his father's death in 1783. The succession was unchallenged, and Said took possession of the capital, Rustaq.

His brothers Saif and Sultan bin Ahmad called on Sheikh Sakar of the Shemal tribal group to help them gain the throne.

Sheikh Sakar took the towns of Hamra, Shargah, Rams and Khor Fakan. Said fought back, but was unable to regain these towns.

However, Saif and Sultan felt it was too dangerous for them to stay in Oman. Saif sailed for East Africa, intending to set himself up as a ruler there. He died there soon after. Sultan escaped to Gwadar on the Makran coast of Balochistan.

== Deposition ==
The Imam was increasingly unpopular. Around the end of 1785 a group of notables elected his brother, Qais bin Ahmad Al Busaidi, Imam. This revolt soon collapsed.

Later one of Said‘s sons was held prisoner in Fort Al Jalali for a period by the governor of Muscat. Another son, Hamad bin Said, came to negotiate with the governor. Hamad and his followers managed to gain control of forts al-Jalali and al-Mirani, and thus of Muscat.

This happened in 1786. One by one the other fortresses in Oman submitted to Hamad, until Said no longer had any temporal power.

Hamad took the title of Sheikh and established his court in Muscat. Said bin Ahmad remained in Rustaq and retained the title of Imam, but this was purely a symbolic religious title that carried no power.
