= Hamad Al Busaidi =

Hamad Al Busaidi may refer to:

- Hamad bin Said Al Busadi, Sultan of Oman from 1786 to 1792
- Hamad bin Thuwaini Al Busaidi, Sultan of Zanzibar from 1893 to 1896
