= Al Alam Palace =

Omani palace

- قصر العلم
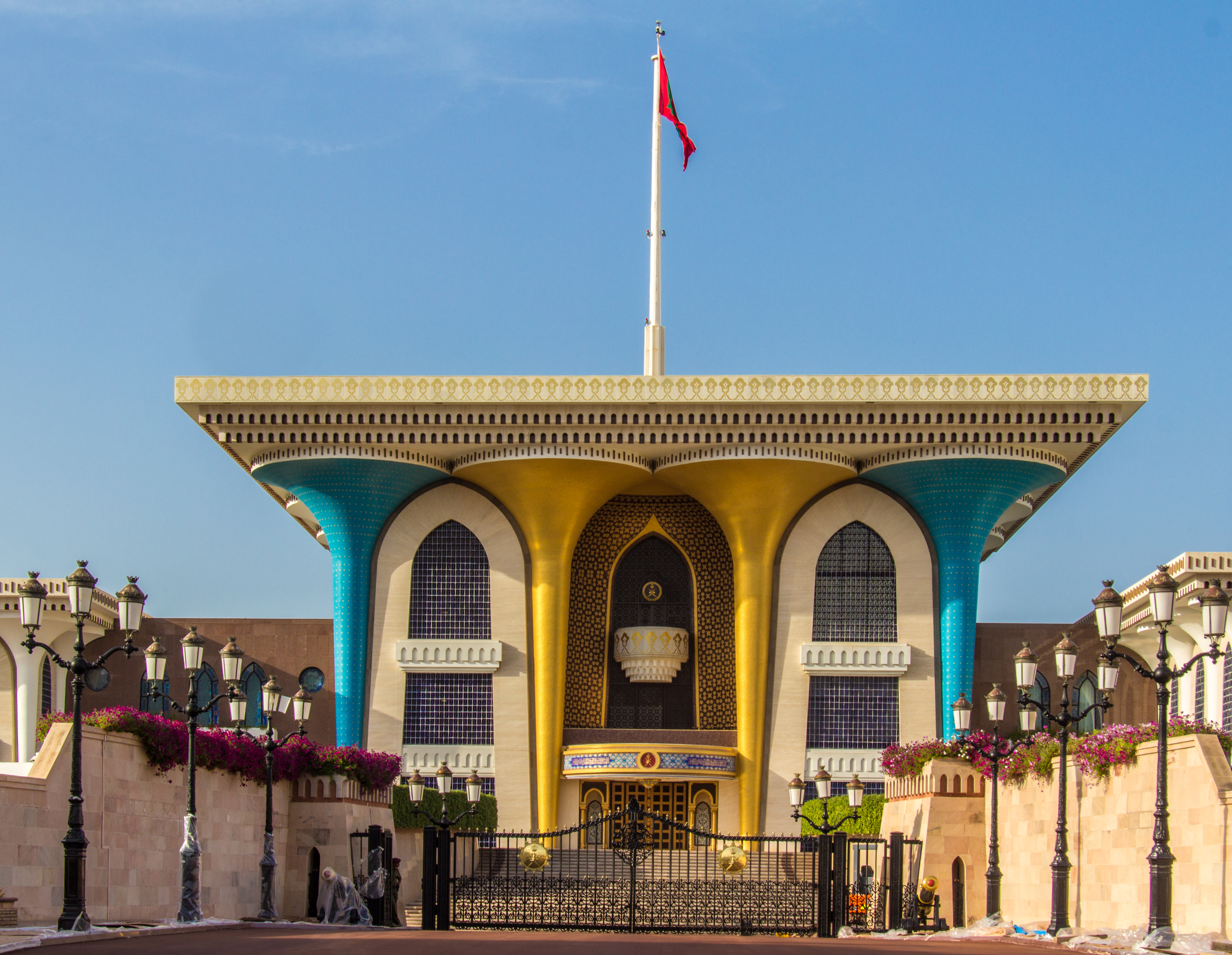

General information
- Type: Palace
- Location: JH8V 9V8, Old Muscat, Oman
- Coordinates: 23.6160°N 58.5947°E
- Owner: Sultan of Oman

Al Alam Palace (Arabic: قصر العلم Qaṣr al-ʿAlam, "Palace of the Flag") is the ceremonial palace of the sultan of Oman. It is used for official functions like welcoming foreign dignitaries and heads of state.

== Old Palace ==
Sultan Said bin Sultan had a palace, Bayt al-'Alam, built in the early 1800s on the foundations of the old sea wall between Al-Mirani Fort and Al Jalali Fort built in the 16th century by the Portuguese. The palace was damaged by tribal insurgents in 1895 but Sultan Faisal bin Turki did not have it repaired due to lack of funds. In the 20th century, Sultan Said bin Taimur spent most of his time in Salalah and had the palace locked up. It was demolished in 1971 to make way for the new palace.

== Current Palace ==
The current palace, Qaṣr al-ʿAlam, was commissioned by Sultan Qaboos bin Said and erected in the same place between the two forts. The palace was designed by the Indian architectural firm Shapoorji Pallonji in a flamboyant style, and was completed in 1972. Its façade has gold and blue columns. The inner grounds of the palace are off limits, but members of the public are permitted to stop near the gates and take photographs.

== Surrounding area ==
The palace is located on the north end of a 250-metre (820 ft) long arcaded plaza, facing the National Museum of Oman.

The palace is flanked by the Portuguese-built Al-Mirani and Al-Jalali forts. The modern government buildings in the vicinity are white, with crenellated rooftops and wooden balconies in the traditional Omani style. The palace can also be viewed by boat from the harbour.

== Gallery ==
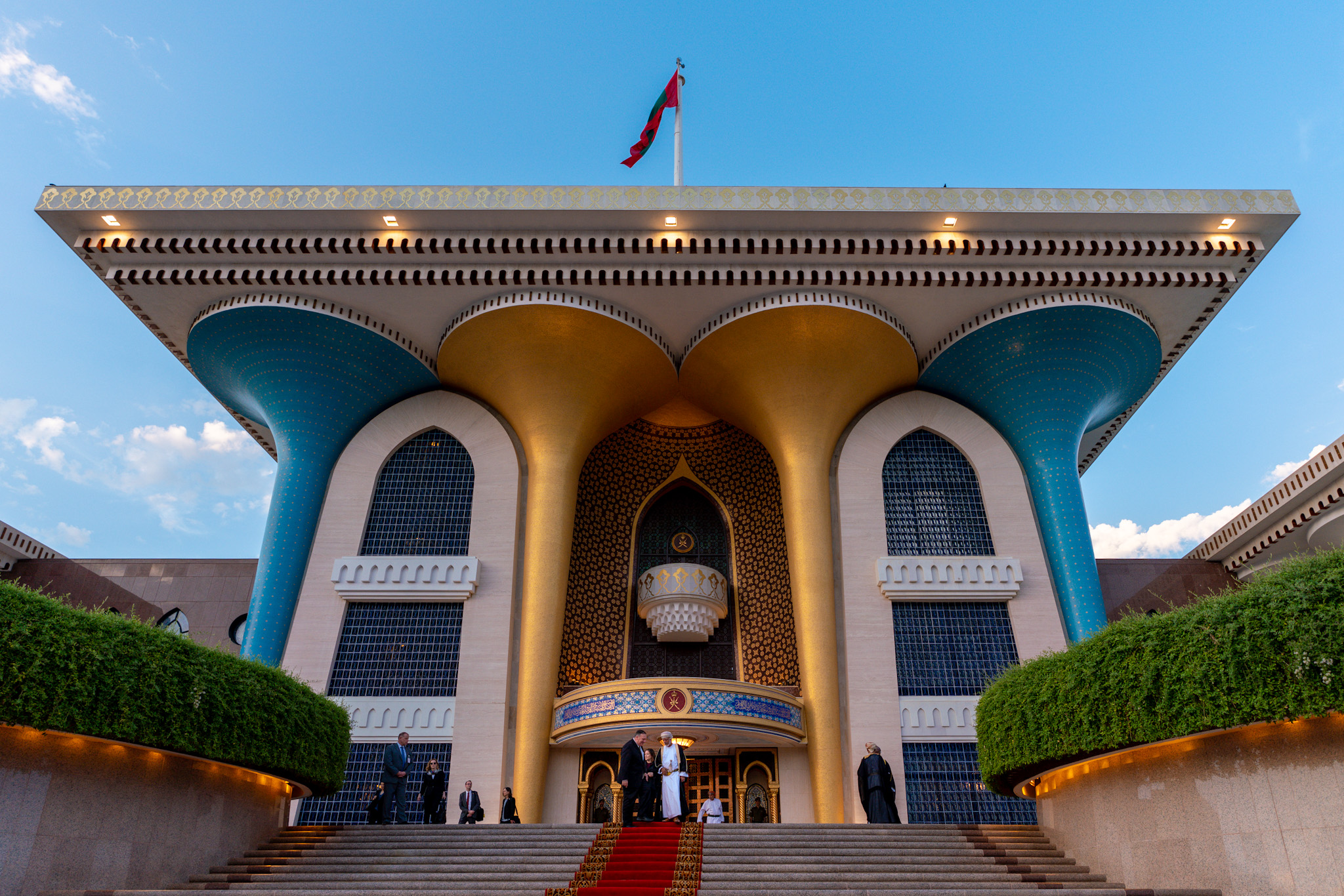
Main entrance

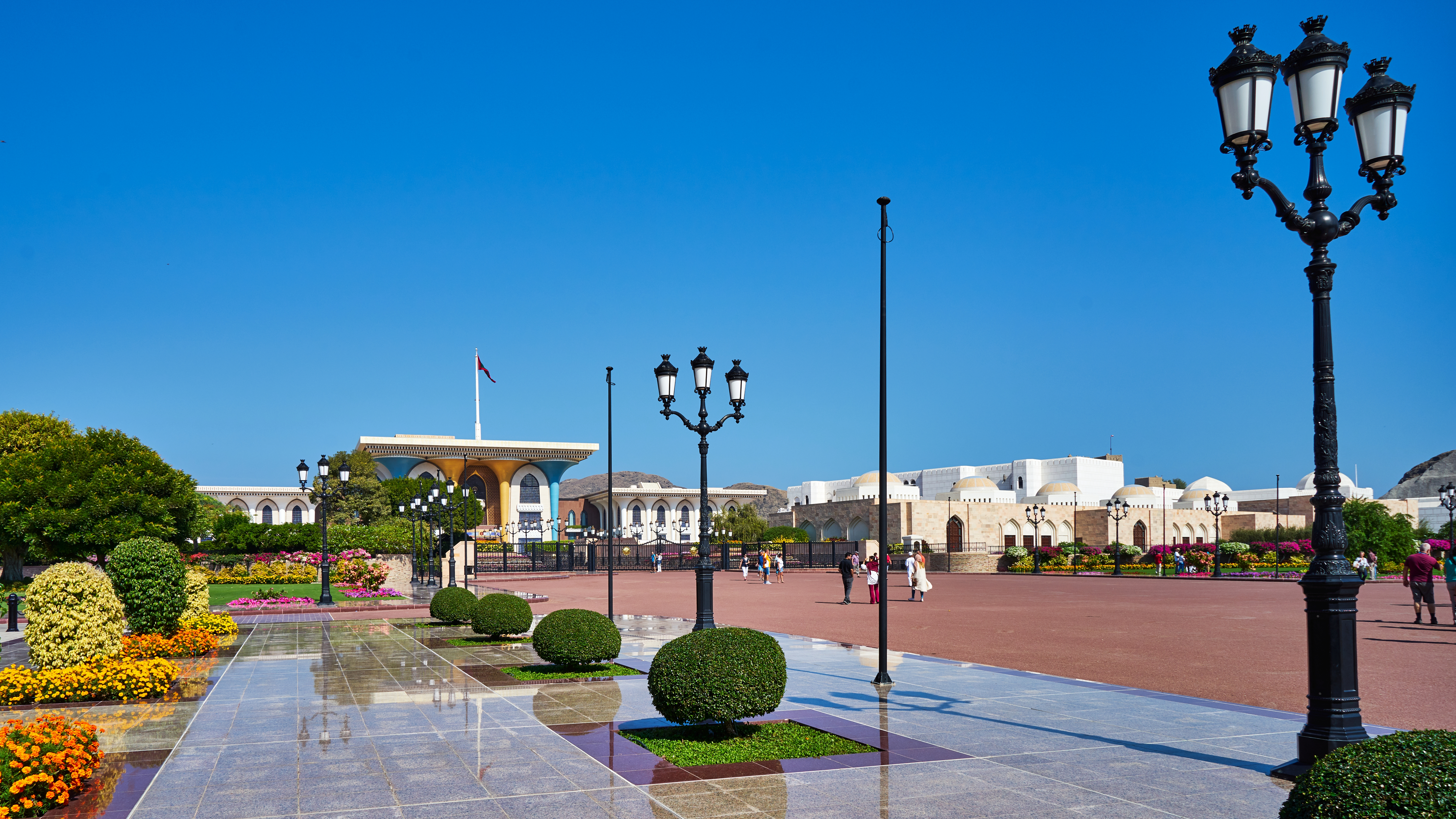
Courtyard

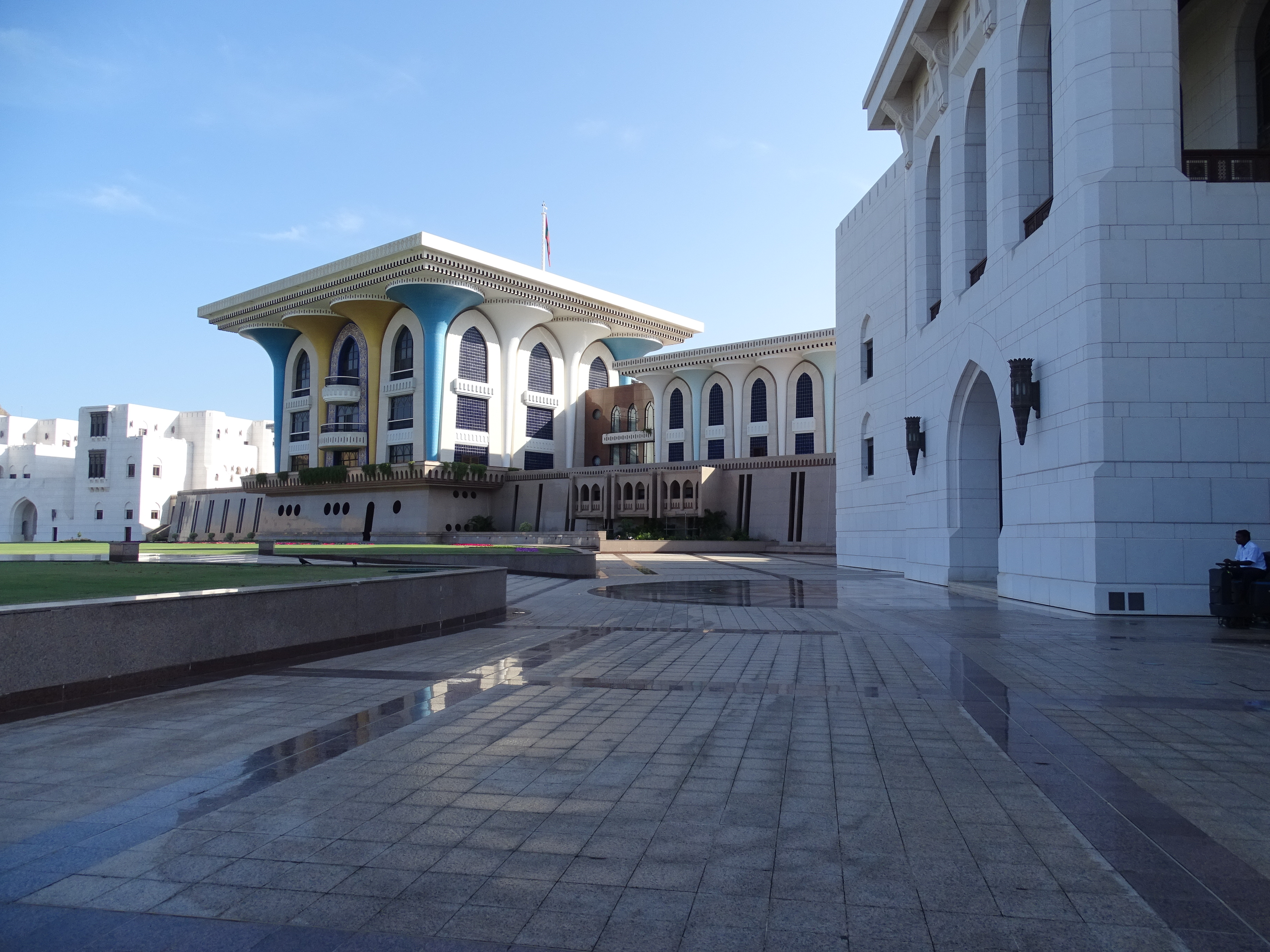
Sideview

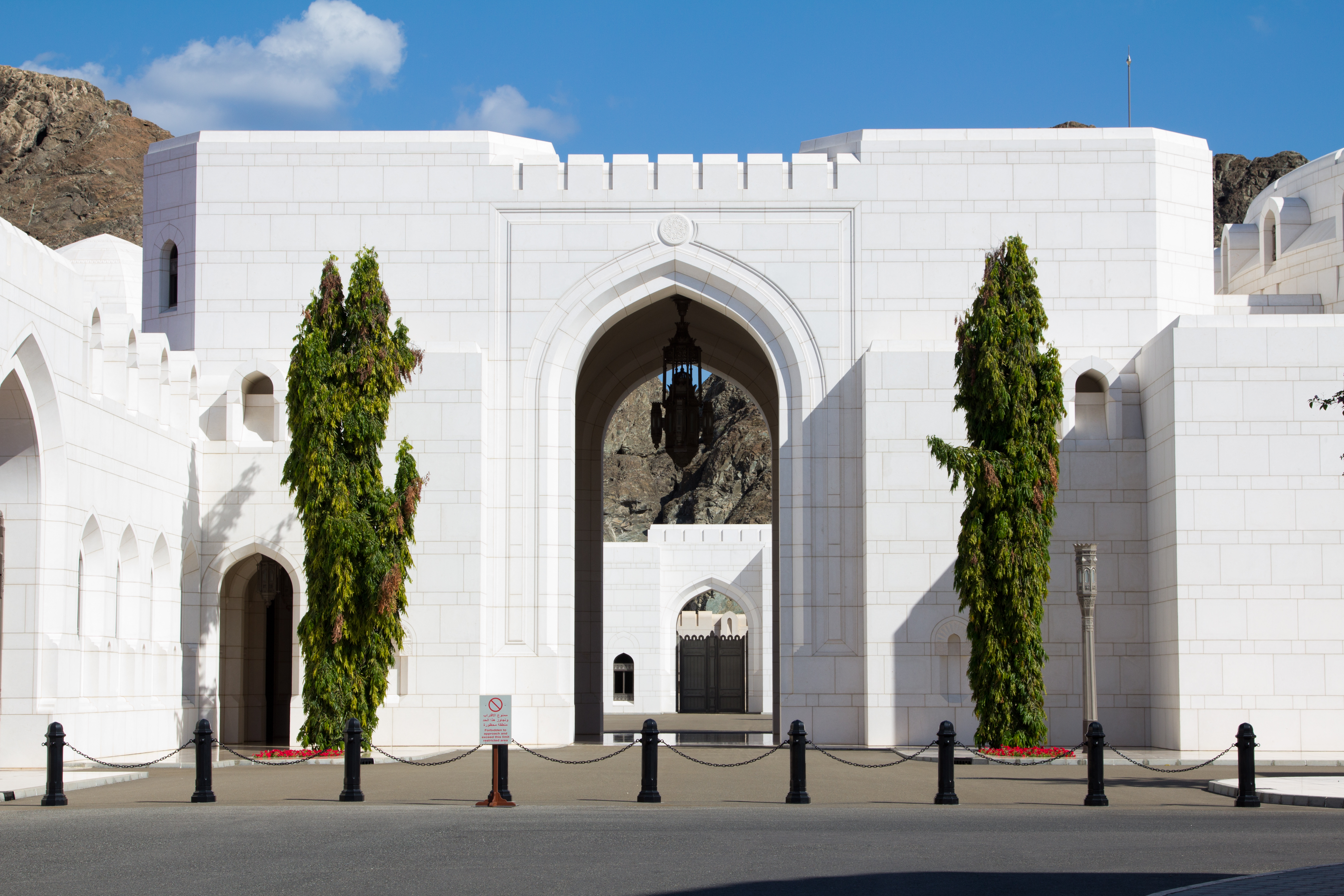
Gate

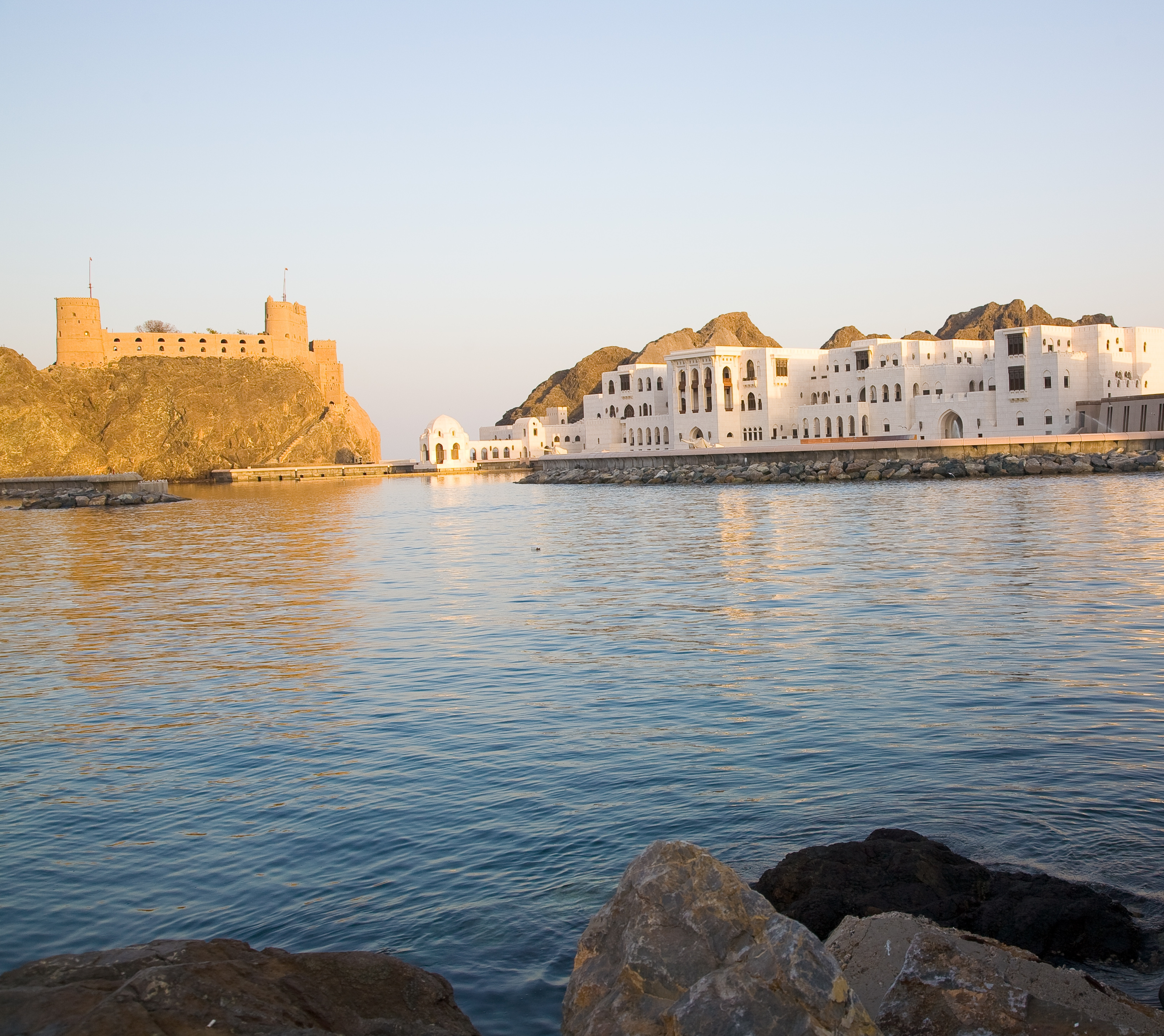
View from the harbor

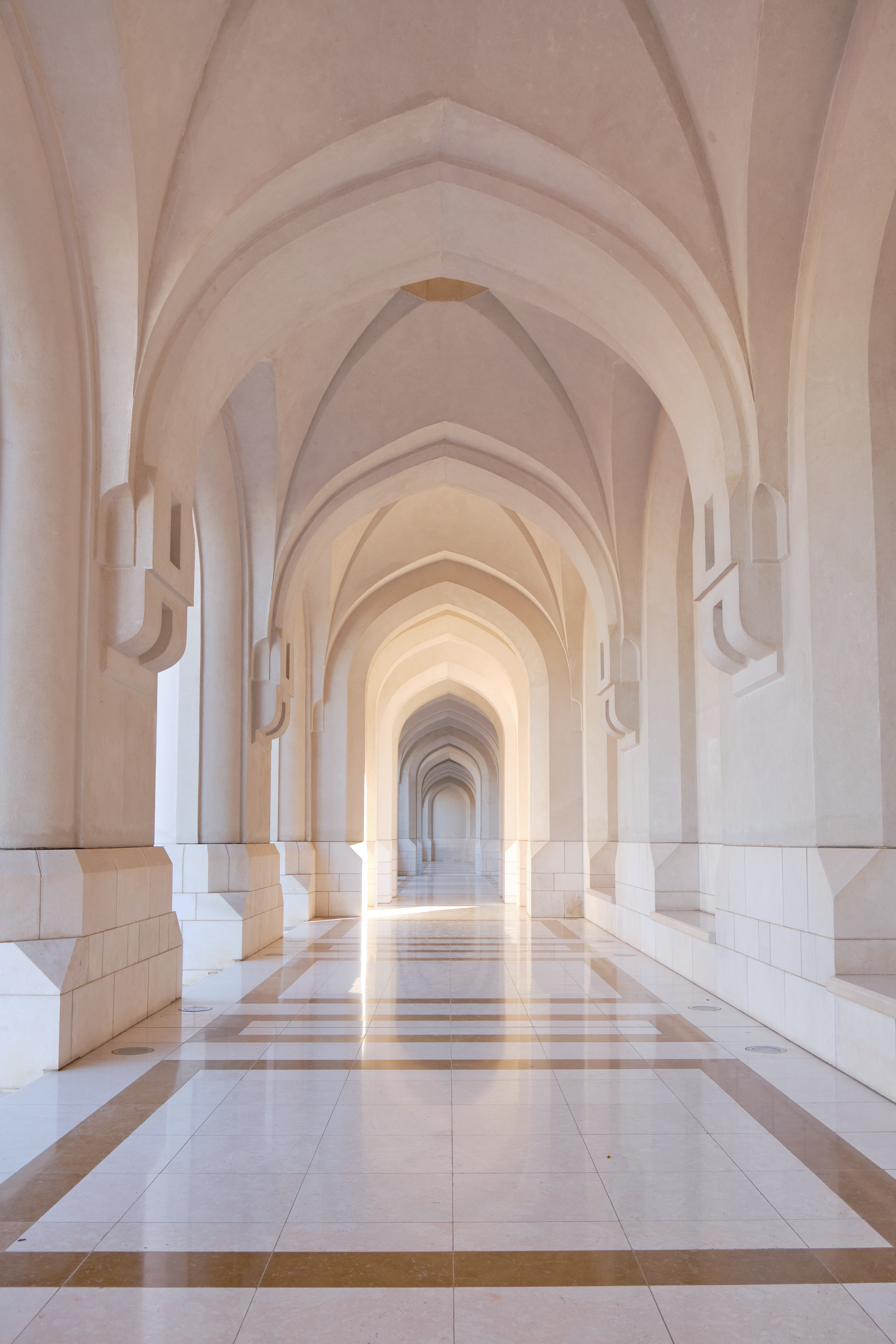
Corridor
