= Qais bin Ahmad Al Busaidi =

Omani royal

Qais bin Ahmad
- Born: Qais bin Ahmad bin Sa'id Al-Busaidi
- Died: May 1808; Khor Fakkan
- Occupation: Governor of Sohar

Qais bin Ahmad (died May 1808) was the third son of Ahmad bin Sa'id Al-Busaidi, the first Sultan of Oman of the Al Said dynasty. After his father's death he made more than one attempt to gain the throne.

== Youth and first revolt ==
Qais bin Ahmad bin Sa'id Al-Busaidi was the third son of Ahmad bin Said. He has been described as "headstrong, ambitious and inclined to give trouble." His father made him governor of Sohar, an important port in the north of Oman. His older brother Said bin Ahmad was elected Imam when his father died in December 1783. The Imam Said became increasingly unpopular. Towards the end of 1785 Qais bin Ahmad declared himself independent. A small number of dissident leaders elected him Imam at Al-Masna'ah, on the Batinah coast. This revolt soon collapsed.

== Rules of Hamad and Sultan ==
In 1786 the Imam's son Hamad bin Said managed to get control of Muscat, with its fortress. One by one the other fortresses in Oman submitted to Hamad. Said no longer had any temporal power. Hamad took the title of Sheikh and established his court in Muscat. His father, Said bin Ahmad, remained in Rustaq and retained the title of Imam, but this was purely a symbolic religious title that carried no power. Hamad died of smallpox in 1792. On Hamad's death Sultan bin Ahmad took control in Muscat. He was the fifth son of Ahmad bin Sa'id. To avoid family disputes, at a meeting in Barka he confirmed his brother Said as Imam in Rustaq, and he ceded control of Sohar to Qais bin Ahmad. In 1800, Oman suffered from an invasion by Wahhabis from the north, who occupied the Buraimi oasis and besieged Qais bin Ahmad in Sohar.

== Second revolt ==
The Imam Sultan died in 1804 on an expedition to Basra. He appointed Mohammed bin Nasir bin Mohammed al-Jabry the Regent and guardian of his two young sons, Salim bin Sultan and Said bin Sultan. Qais decided to make another attempt to seize power. Early in 1805 he joined forces with his younger brother Mohammed and marched down the coast to Muttrah, which he took with little opposition. Mohammed bin Nasir tried to buy Qais off with a large monthly annuity. Qais refused since he had growing support and was confident of success, and continued to besiege Muscat. Mohammed bin Nasir called on Badr bin Saif for help. Badr was the son of Saif bin Ahmad, the brother of the former Imam.

Badr bin Saif arrived at Muscat just in time to forestall its capitulation. He also arranged for the Wahabbis to attack Sohar. Qais agree to lift the siege in return for being given Al Khaburah and part of the Batinah. A month later he returned and again took Muttrah, but was forced to withdraw when a large seaborne force of Wahabbis appeared. He accepted peace on the grounds that he would gain Muttrah as well as the other places he had taken, and a monthly subsidy. In July he broke his engagement and again advanced on Muscat. The Wahabbis again attacked Sohar, while Said bin Sultan advanced into the Samail valley. Kais was forced to make peace, and gave up Muttrah and his subsidy.

== Death ==
In May 1808 Qais bin Ahmad was killed at Khor Fakkan in a battle with Shaikh Sultan Al-Qasimi of Ras Al Khaimah/Sharjah. He had one son and one daughter. His son Azzan bin Qais inherited the position of governor of Sohar.
