= Al Jalali Fort =

Fort in the harbor of Old Muscat, Oman

Fort al-Jalali
- Arabic: قلعة الجلالي
- Muscat, Oman
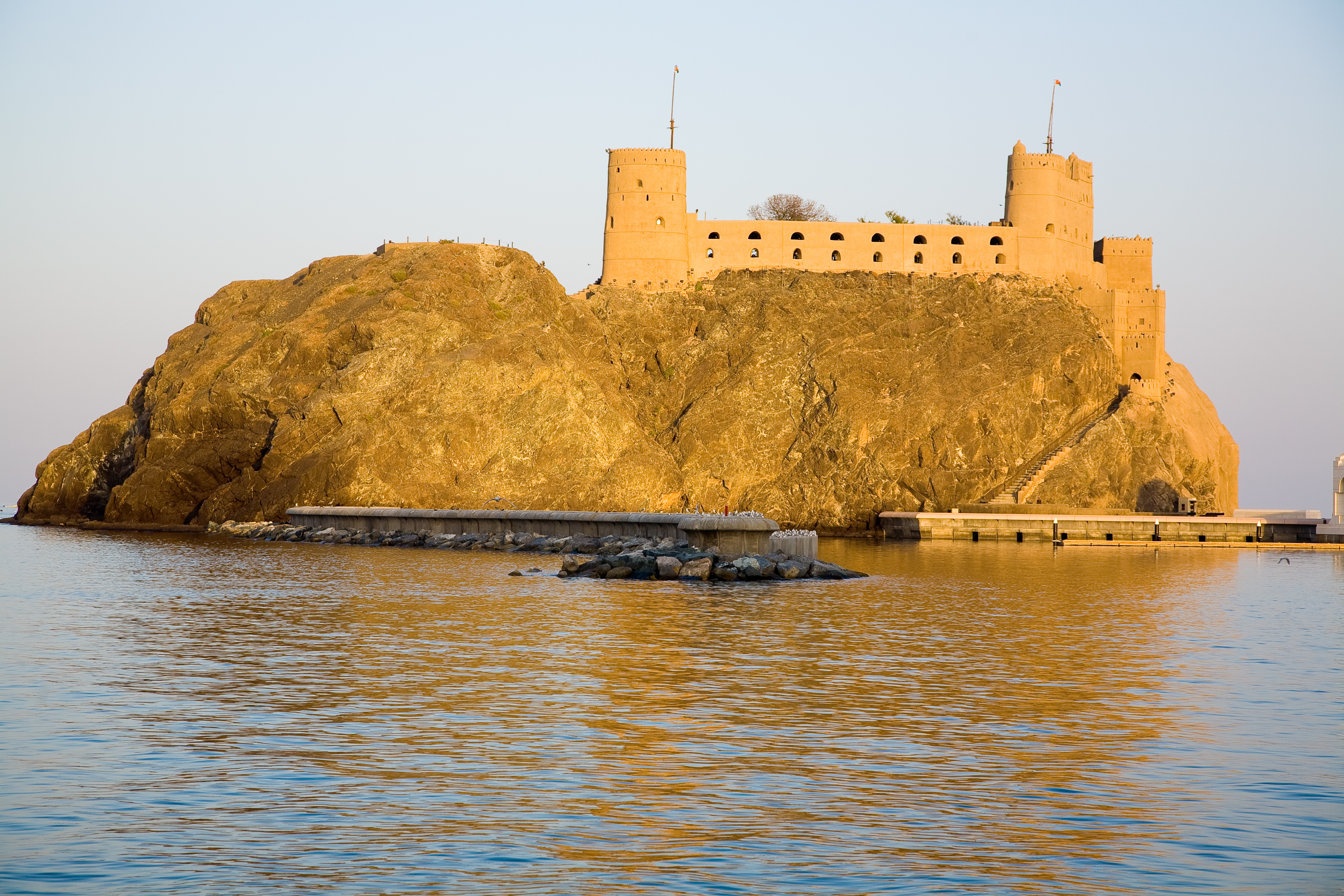
- Fort al-Jalali

Site information
- Owner: Government of Oman
- Controlled by: Portugal (1586–1649); Ya'rubids (1649–1738); Afsharid dynasty (1738–1749); Omani Empire (1749–1856); Muscat and Oman (1856–1970); Oman (1970–present)
- Open to the public: No
- Condition: Restored

Location
- Location within Oman
- Coordinates: 23.616604°N 58.597614°E

Site history
- Built: pre-1550 (first fort); c. 1586 (second fort)
- Built by: Oman (first fort); Portuguese Empire (second fort)

Al Jalali Fort, or Ash Sharqiya Fort, is a fort in the harbor of Old Muscat, Oman. The fort was built by the Portuguese under Philip I of Portugal in the 1580s on an earlier Omani fortress to protect the harbor after Muscat had twice been sacked by Ottoman forces. The fort fell to Omani forces in 1650. During the civil wars between 1718 and 1747, the fort was twice captured by Persians who had been invited to assist one of the rival Imams. The fort was extensively rebuilt later.

At times, Al Jalali served as a refuge or a jail for a member of the royal family. For much of the 20th century it was used as Oman's main prison, but this function ended in the 1970s. Fort al-Jalali was restored in 1983 and converted into a private museum of Omani cultural history that is accessible only to dignitaries visiting the country. Exhibits include cannons, old muskets and matchlocks, maps, rugs and other artifacts.

== Etymology ==
The Portuguese called the structure Forte de São João (Fort St. John). The origin of the present name "Al Jalali" is disputed. One theory is that it comes from the Arabic Al Jalal, which means "great beauty". Legend states that it was named after a Baluchi commander called Mir Jalal Khan from the tribe of Hooth, so was Fort Al-Mirani named after his brother, Mir Miran, who also a commander. Al Jalali Fort is also known as the Ash Sharqiya Fort.

== Location ==
"Muscat" means "anchorage". True to its name, Old Muscat is a natural port in a strategic location between the Persian Gulf and the Indian Ocean. It lies on the coast of the Gulf of Oman on a bay about 700 metres (2,300 ft) long, protected from the sea by a rocky island. (Note: The modern city of Muscat lies about 4 kilometres (2.5 mi) to the west of the port of Old Muscat and its neighboring port of Muttrah, and greater Muscat extends further westward along the coast.) The port is surrounded by mountains, making it difficult to access from the landward side. Muscat may have been described by the geographer Ptolemy in the 2nd century, who noted a "concealed harbor" in the region.

Al Jalali Fort lies on a rocky outcrop on the east side of the Muscat harbor. It faces Fort Al-Mirani, which is built on another outcrop on the west side. Muscat was strongly defended against attack from the sea by these twin forts, by the Muttrah fort further to the west and by other fortifications on the rocky ridges surrounding the bay. Until recently, the fort was only accessible from the harbor side by way of a steep flight of stone steps. Land reclamation on the seaward side of the rock has now provided space for a heliport. A funicular railway makes the fort more accessible.

== History ==
=== Background ===
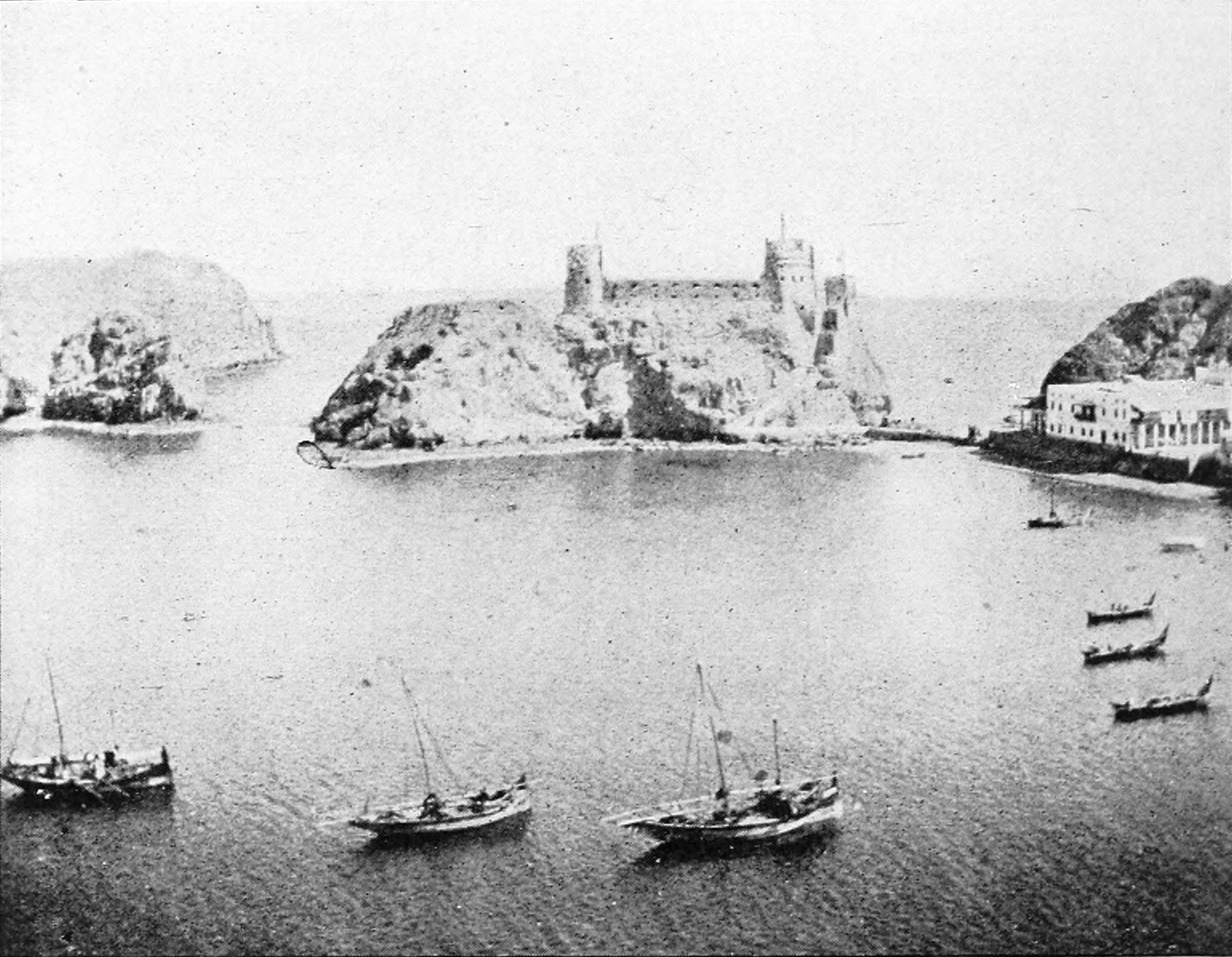
Muscat harbour c.1903. View from the west, with Al Jalali Fort in the background

In the early 15th century Muscat was a minor port, used by ships as a place to collect water. By the start of the 16th century it was becoming an important trading center. At this time the interior of Oman was ruled by an Arab Imam, but the coast on which Muscat lay was subject to the Persian King of Hormuz. In 1497 the Portuguese navigator Vasco da Gama found a route around the southern cape of Africa and east to India and the Spice Islands. The Portuguese quickly began trying to establish a monopoly on the trade in spices, silk and other goods. They came into conflict with Mamluk Egypt, whose trade with Europe through the Red Sea was threatened. Hormuz was the main center for the trade route with modern Iraq and Iran through the Persian Gulf. The Portuguese wanted control of this route, too.

On 10 August 1507, an expedition of six ships under Admiral Afonso de Albuquerque left the newly established Portuguese base on Socotra with Hormuz as the objective. (Note: Portuguese sources give different accounts of the orders given to Albuquerque. Some say he had been instructed to take Aden and blockade the Red Sea, rather than take Hormuz. He may have been given considerable discretion in choosing his approach, with the overall objective of disrupting trade.) The Portuguese sailed along the Oman coast destroying ships and looting the towns. At Qurayyat, which they took after a hard fight, the Portuguese mutilated their captives, killed the inhabitants regardless of sex or age, and despoiled and burned the town. Muscat, at first, surrendered unconditionally to avoid the same fate. However, the people withdrew their submission when reinforcements arrived. Albuquerque launched a successful assault against Muscat. He slaughtered most of the inhabitants, and then plundered and burned the town.

The Portuguese continued along the coast. The governor of Sohar agreed to transfer his allegiance to the king of Portugal and to pay tribute. The Portuguese arrived at Hormuz on 26 September 1507. They took the town after fierce resistance on 10 October 1507. Albuquerque signed a treaty under which the Portuguese were free of customs duties and could build a fort and trading factory at Hormuz. Muscat now became a regular port of call for the Portuguese. Diogo Fernandes de Beja came there in 1512 to collect the tribute. Albuquerque, now Viceroy of India, visited in March 1515. In 1520 a fleet of twenty three Portuguese ships anchored in the harbor en route from the Red Sea to Hormuz. When a general revolt against Portuguese rule over Hormuz broke out in November 1521, Muscat was the one place where the Portuguese were not attacked.

=== Portuguese stronghold ===
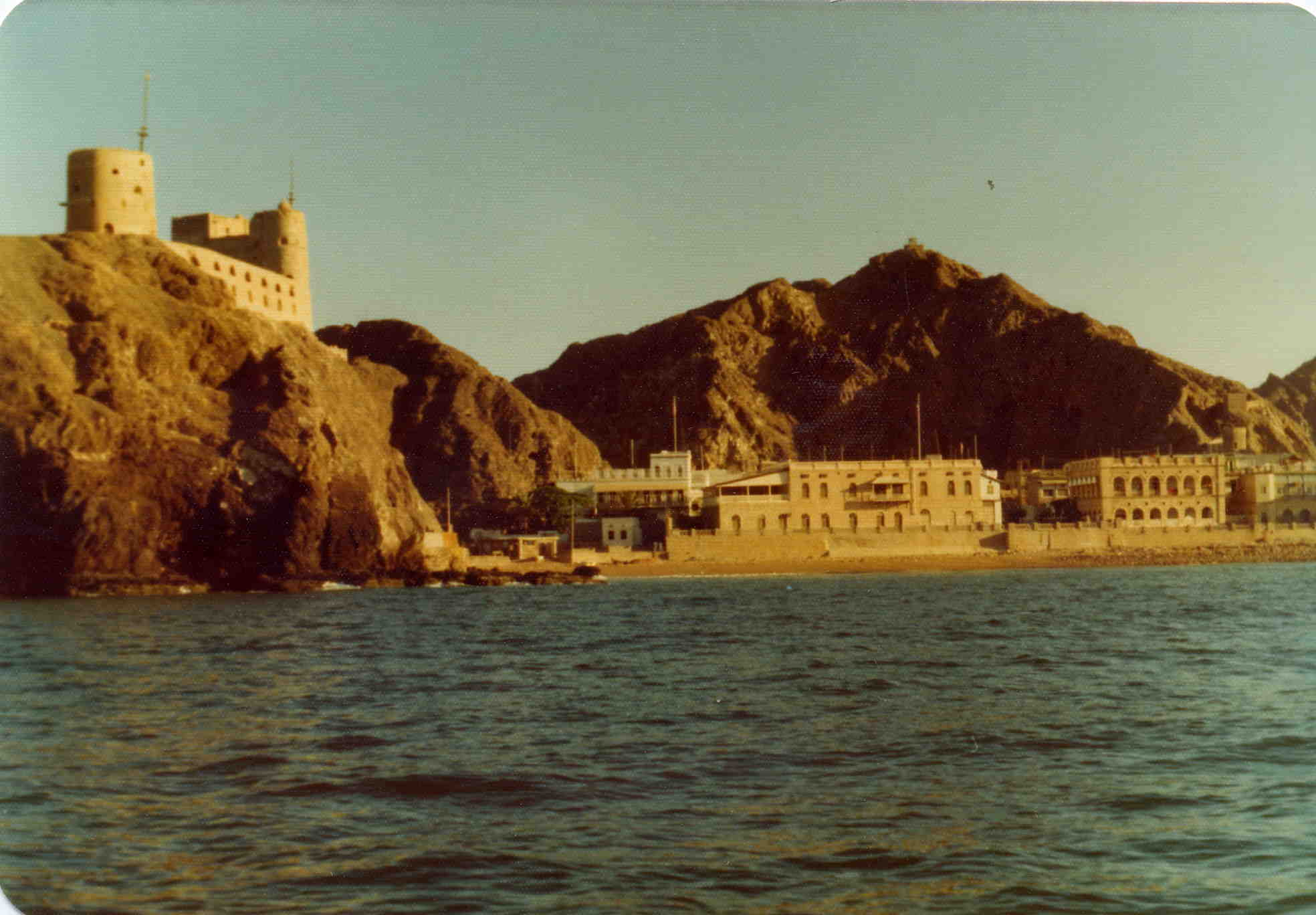
Fort Jalali (left) dominating Muscat Harbor

In 1527 the Portuguese began to construct barracks, a warehouse and chapel at Muscat, apparently completed in 1531. A force of four Ottoman galiots entered the harbor in 1546 and bombarded the town, but did not land. To make their base more secure, the Portuguese sent an engineer to build a fort to the west of the harbor, where al-Mirani stands today. The Portuguese built this first Muscat fort in 1550 on perhaps the foundations of an earlier existing fortress mentioned by Albuquerque in his description of Muscat. In April 1552 an Ottoman fleet of twenty four galleys and four supply ships under Piri Reis left Suez en route to Hormuz, aiming to eliminate Portuguese presence in the region. An advance force landed at Muscat in July 1552. After an eighteen-day siege of Muscat the town fell and the fort was destroyed. The commander, João de Lisboa, and 128 Portuguese were taken captive. The main Ottoman fleet arrived, and the combined fleet went on to Hormuz. The Portuguese regained the town two years later, and in 1554 repulsed another attack by the Turks.

Fort Al Jalali was built after the Ottomans sacked Muscat for a second time in 1582. In 1587 Captain Belchior Calaça (Note: Samuel Barrett Miles gives the name of the captain who built the fort as "Melchior Calaça". Other sources give it as "Belchior Calaça".) was sent to Muscat to build the fortress, which was named Forte de São João. The top of the prominence on which the fort stands was first leveled, and the rock was scarped. Calaça built a cistern to hold water for the occupants and armed the fort with cannon. It seems to have been built on older foundations. The main improvement made by the Portuguese was to construct a gun deck looking over the harbor. Fort al-Jalali and the twin Fort al-Mirani were both completed between 1586 and 1588.

The Portuguese faced growing competition in the region from English and Dutch traders. In 1622 a joint Persian-English force took Hormuz. After this the Portuguese built forts in other ports on the Omani coast, although they abandoned most of them in 1633–34, concentrating on defending Muscat. After 1622 the Portuguese began to strengthen Fort al Jalali, apparently with the intention of making it the main fort. However, in 1623 Forte do Almirante (today's Fort Al-Mirani) was still considered the more important of the two forts, and was used as a residence in the hot weather by the governor of Muscat.

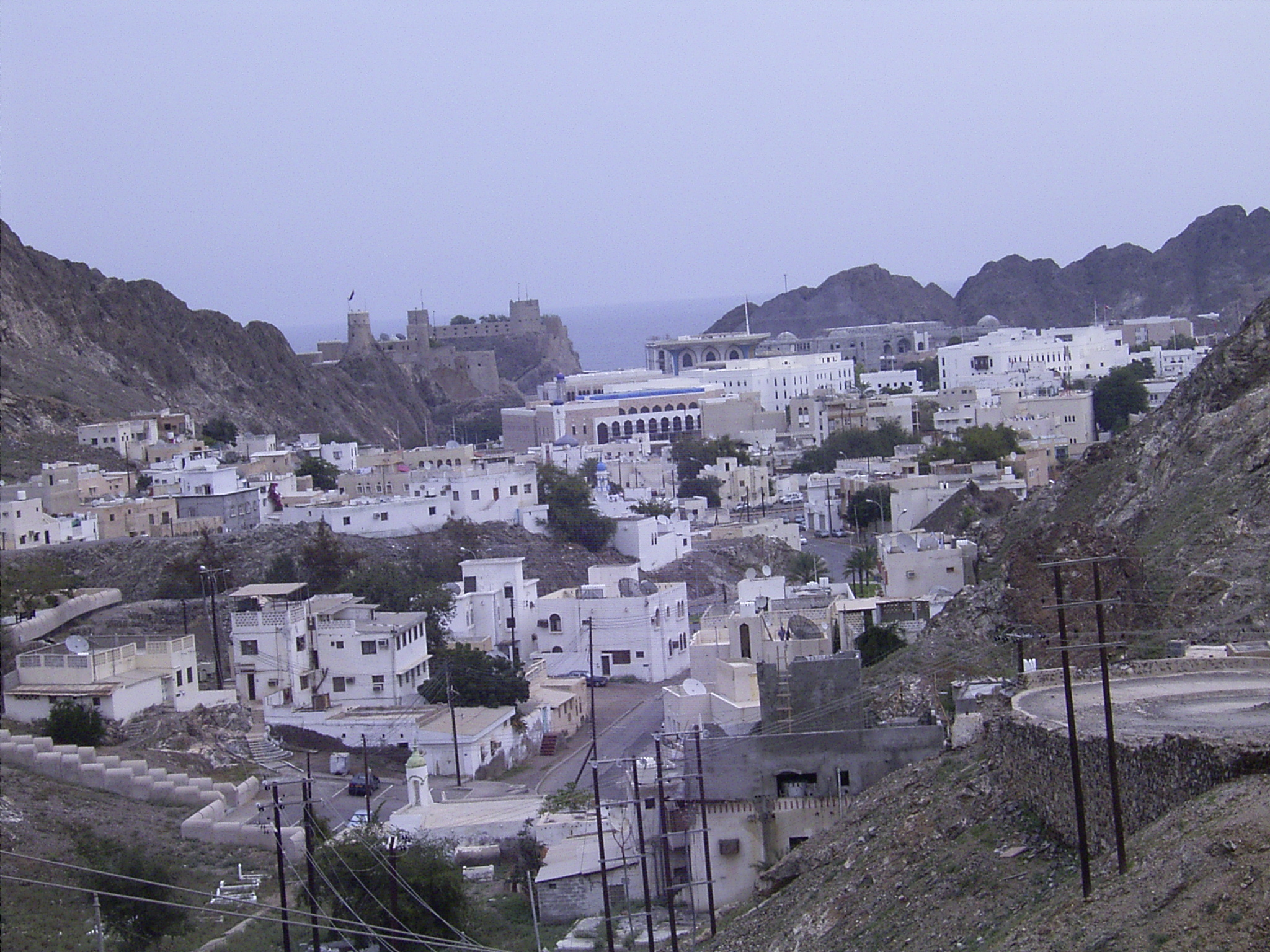
Old Muscat from the south, forts in the background

In 1625 the Portuguese built walls and towers around Muscat to improve the defenses. Remains of these fortifications exist today. Muscat was a drain on Portuguese finances, with its requirement to maintain large military and naval forces to defend it. Trade did not prosper as hoped since the Persian market was closed to them until 1630. By then the Dutch and English dominated trade in the Persian Gulf.

Nasir bin Murshid (r. 1624–49) was the first Imam of the Yaruba dynasty in Oman, elected in 1624. He was able to unify the tribes with a common goal of expelling the Portuguese. Nasir bin Murshid drove the Portuguese out of all their bases in Oman except Muscat. He was succeeded by his cousin Sultan bin Saif in 1649. In December 1649 the forces of Sultan bin Saif captured the town of Muscat. About 600 Portuguese managed to escape by sea, while others fled into Forte do Almirante (al Mirani). They surrendered on 23 January 1650. (Note: Since Fort al-Jalali seems to have been the stronger of the two forts, it has been speculated that the Portuguese took refuge there rather than in Fort al-Mirani, as traditionally believed.) The capture of Muscat from the Portuguese marked the beginning of an expansion of Omani sea power in which the Portuguese possessions in India and East Africa soon came under threat.

=== Persian invasions ===
After the death in 1718 of the fifth Yaruba Imam of Oman, Sultan bin Saif II, a struggle began between rival contenders for the Imamate. Fort al-Jalali was damaged during this civil war. The country became divided between Saif bin Sultan II and his cousin Bal'arab bin Himyar, rival Imams. Finding his power dwindling, Saif bin Sultan II asked for help from Nader Shah of Persia. In 1738 the two forts were surrendered to the Persian forces. The Persians reembarked for Persia, taking their loot with them.

A few years later Saif bin Sultan II, who had been deposed, again called for help. A Persian expedition arrived at Julfar around October 1742. The Persians made an unsuccessful attempt to take Muscat, defeated by a stratagem of the new Imam Sultan bin Murshid. Later in 1743 the Persians returned, bringing Saif bin Sultan II with them. They took the town of Muscat, but the al-Jalali and al-Mirani forts held out and Saif bin Sultan II would not order them to yield. Omani historians say that the Persian commander, Mirza Taki, invited Saif to a banquet on his ship. Saif became stupefied by wine and his seal was taken from him. It was used to forge orders to the forts' commanders to surrender, a ruse that was successful.

=== Later history ===
Ahmad bin Said al-Busaidi, the first ruler of the Al Said dynasty, blockaded Muscat and captured the forts in 1749. He renovated them, particularly al-Jalali. The function of al-Jalali changed from passive defense of the harbor to a base from which troops could be dispatched. In the decades that followed the large central buildings and the round towers were added.

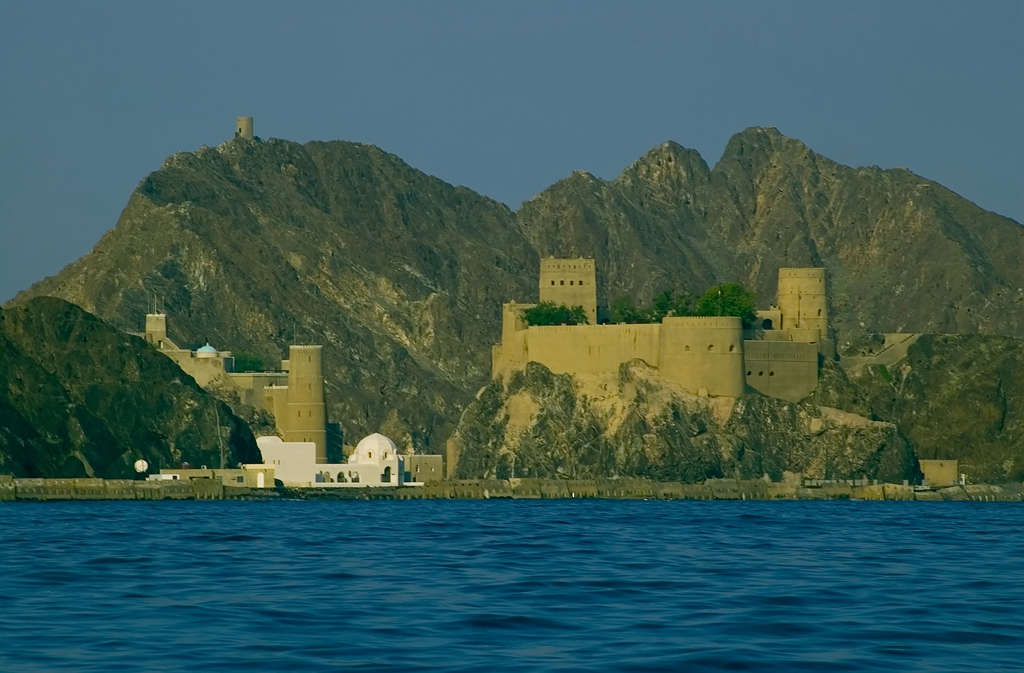
Harbor from the northwest: al-Jalali fort (left) and al-Mirani fort (right)

Early in 1781 two of Ahmad bin Said's sons, Sultan and Saif, took control of the forts of al-Mirani and al-Jalali. When the governor of Muscat tried to recover the forts, Sultan and Saif began a damaging bombardment of the town. The two brothers gained the support of the powerful Sheikh Saqar, who marched on the capital in April 1781. Their father agreed to an amnesty, letting his rebellious sons hold both the forts. He changed his mind and took al Mirani, while the brothers held al Jelali for some months.

Sultan and Saif then kidnapped their brother Said bin Ahmad and imprisoned him in al Jalali. The Imam, their father, hurried to Muscat which he reached in January 1782. He ordered the commander of al Mirani to fire on al Jalali while his ships joined in from the east of the fort. While this was in progress Said bin Ahmad bribed his jailer and escaped. Isolated and without a hostage, the two brothers agreed to surrender. The Imam took Saif and held him under surveillance to prevent a fresh rebellion. Said bin Ahmad ruled from 1783 to 1789. During his reign his son was held prisoner in Fort al-Jalali for a period by the governor of Muscat, until another of his sons managed to free him.

The fort is mentioned several times in the history of 19th-century Oman. While the ruler of Oman was away on a pilgrimage to Mecca early in 1803, his nephew Badr bin Saif made an attempt to get control of Fort Jalali. The story is that he was being smuggled into the fort in a large box, but was detected by a Hindu trader. He managed to escape and took refuge in Qatar. In June 1849 the governor of Sohar made a treaty with the British resident to suppress the slave trade. This triggered a revolt by the religious party in which the governor was killed and his father, Hamad, was made governor. The sultan of Oman, then residing in Zanzibar, arranged for Hamad to be seized and thrown in jail in Fort al Jalali. Hamad died on 23 April 1850, either from starvation or from poison. In 1895 the tribes sacked Muscat. Sultan Faisal bin Turki took refuge in Fort al-Jalali until his brother, who was holding Fort al-Mirani, regained control of the town.

For most of the 20th century Fort al-Jalali was the main prison in Oman, holding about 200 prisoners. Some were Omanis from the interior captured during the Jebel Akhdar War (1954–59), or taken after that war. Other prisoners were taken during the Dhofar Rebellion (1962–76). It was the most notorious of Omani prisons, which were known for their appalling conditions. Colonel David Smiley, commander of the Sultan's armed forces at Muscat, called the prison "a veritable hellhole". In 1963 forty four prisoners escaped in a well-planned break-out, but most were quickly recaptured, handicapped by their weakened physical condition. In 1969 a guard helped two members of the royal family escape, but they were caught after a few days. The prison was closed in the 1970s.

== Structure and exhibits ==
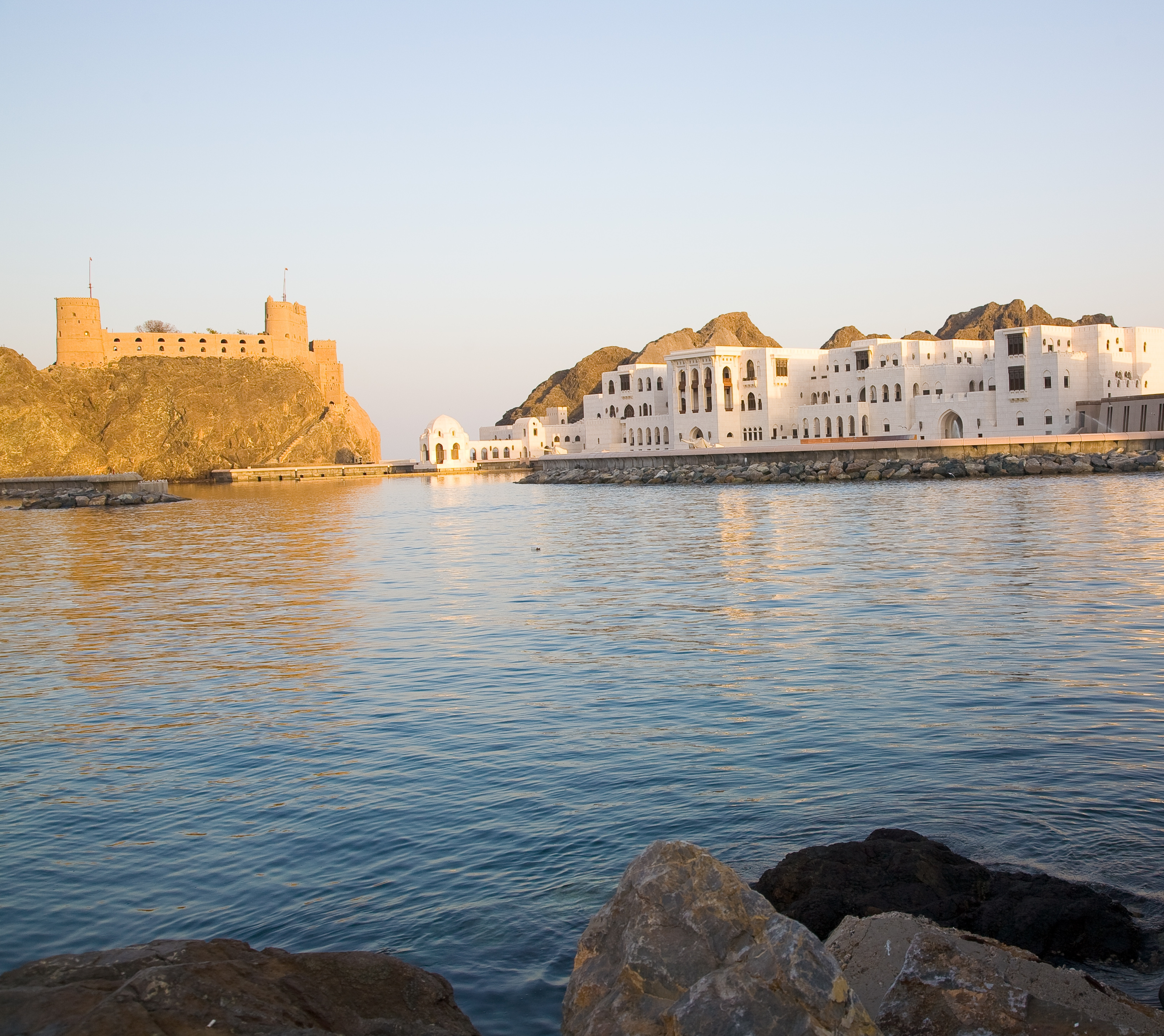
Fort and harbor in 2008

Fort al-Jalali was restored in 1983. Today little remains of the Portuguese period apart from a few inscriptions in that language. It has been converted into a museum of Omani cultural history. It is open to important people such as visiting heads of state, but not to the public.

The fort is made up of two towers with a connecting wall pierced by gun ports for cannon. The interior is now landscaped with fountains and pools, trees and gardens. The result has been described as "Disneyfication". In the center of the fort there is a courtyard planted with trees. Around it on various levels are rooms, enclosures and towers accessible through a complex set of stairways that may have once had a defensive purpose. Massive doors with protruding iron spikes protect sections of the fort.

Exhibits include cannons at the gun ports with shot, ropes and firing equipment, as well as old muskets and matchlocks. There are maps and historical illustrations, including a plaque that depicts the winds and the currents in Muscat bay. One room, with a ceiling made from palm-logs, is filled with cultural relics of Oman. The central square tower holds the main museum exhibits including rugs, pottery, jewelry, weapons, household utensils and incense holders. A dining hall overlooks the courtyard for use by the distinguished visitors. An old breeze-maker has been preserved in this room, once manually operated but now mechanized.

The fort plays a role in special events where the royal dhow and yacht sail in through the harbor, fireworks are launched and bagpipers play on the battlements.

== See also ==
- Al Alam Palace

== Sources ==
- Torstrick, Rebecca; Faier, Elizabeth (2009). Culture and Customs of the Arab Gulf States. Greenwood Press. p. 77.
- Al-Belushi, M.A.K. (2013-06-01). "The heritage prospective and urban expansion in capital cities: old defence sites in Muscat. Oman". In Brebbia, C. A. (ed.). Structural Studies, Repairs and Maintenance of Heritage Architecture XIII. WIT Press. ISBN 978-1-84564-730-8.
- "Al Jalali Fort". Ministry of Tourism, Sultanate of Oman. Archived from the original on 2013-04-27.
- "Al Jalali Fort". Oman Observer. Archived from the original on 2009-09-12.
- Casale, Giancarlo (2010-01-26). The Ottoman Age of Exploration. Oxford University Press. ISBN 978-0-19-979879-7.
- Floor, Willem M.; Hakimzadeh, Farhad (2007). The Hispano-Portuguese Empire and Its Contacts with Safavid Persia, the Kingdom of Hormuz and Yarubid Oman from 1489 to 1720: A Bibliography of Printed Publications, 1508–2007. Peeters Publishers. ISBN 978-90-429-1952-5.
- Ibn-Razîk, Salîl (2010-06-03). History of the Imâms and Seyyids of 'Omân: From A.D. 661-1856. Cambridge University Press. ISBN 978-1-108-01138-9.
- Kaylani, Nabil M. (November 1979). "Politics and Religion in 'Uman: A Historical Overview". International Journal of Middle East Studies. 10 (4). Cambridge University Press: 567–579. doi:10.1017/S0020743800051345. JSTOR 162218.
- Miles, Samuel Barrett (1919). The Countries and Tribes of the Persian Gulf. Harrison and sons. Vol.I (pp 1-264) Early times to end of Yaareba Dynasty Vol.II (pp 265-580) Al-Bu Sauudi Dynasty to 1880
- Newitt, M. D. D. (1995-01-01). A History of Mozambique. Indiana University Press. ISBN 978-0-253-34006-1.
- Nippa, Annegret; Herbstreuth, Peter (2006). Views of a Guest. Verlag Hans Schiler. ISBN 978-3-89930-070-3.
- Peterson, John (2007). Historical Muscat: An Illustrated Guide and Gazetteer. BRILL. ISBN 978-90-04-15266-3.
- Rabi, Uzi (2011). Emergence of States in a Tribal Society: Oman Under Sa'Id Bin Taymur, 1932–1970. Apollo Books. ISBN 978-1-84519-473-4.
- Schulte-Peevers, Andrea; Shearer, Iain (2010). Oman, UAE & Arabian Peninsula. Lonely Planet. ISBN 978-1-74179-145-7.
- Smith, John Alexander (Autumn 1991). "The Islamic Garden in Oman: Sanctuary and Paradise". Garden History. 19 (2). The Garden History Society: 187–208. doi:10.2307/1586894. JSTOR 1586894.
- Thomas, Gavin (2011-11-01). The Rough Guide to Oman. Penguin. ISBN 978-1-4053-8935-8.
- Walker, Jenny; Butler, Stuart; Ham, Anthony; Schulte-Peevers, Andrea (2013-08-01). "Al-Jalali Fort". Lonely Planet Oman, UAE & Arabian Peninsula. Lonely Planet Publications. ISBN 978-1-74321-783-2.
