= Sultan bin Ahmad =

Sultan of the Omani Empire from 1792 to 1804

Sultan bin Ahmed

Sultan of the Omani Empire
- Reign: 1792–1804
- Predecessor: Hamad bin Said
- Successor: Salim bin Sultan and Said bin Sultan
- Died: 1804; Qeshm Island
- Dynasty: Al Bu Said
- Father: Ahmad bin Said al-Busaidi

Sultan bin Ahmad al Busaidi (died 1804) was the Sultan of Oman, the fourth of the Al Bu Said dynasty, ruling the country between 1792 and 1804.

== Early years ==
Sultan bin Ahmad was the son of the Imam and Sultan Ahmad bin Said al-Busaidi. Early in 1781 he and his brother Saif took control of the forts of al-Mirani and al-Jalali that guarded the harbor of Muscat. When the governor of Muscat tried to recover the forts, Sultan and Saif began a damaging bombardment of the town. The two brothers gained the support of the powerful Sheikh Sarkar, who marched on the capital in April 1781. Their father agreed to an amnesty, letting his rebellious sons hold both the forts. He changed his mind and took al Mirani, while the brothers held al Jelali for some months. Sultan and Saif then kidnapped their brother Said bin Ahmad. The Imam, their father, hurried to Muscat which he reached in January 1782. He ordered the commander of Mirani to fire on Jelali, and his ships joined in from the east of the fort. While this was happening, Said bin Ahmad bribed his jailer and escaped. Isolated and without a hostage, the two brothers agreed to surrender. The Imam took Saif and held him under surveillance to prevent a fresh rebellion.

On his father's death in 1783 Said bin Ahmad was elected Imam and took possession of the capital, Rustaq. Sultan and Saif called on Sheikh Sakar of the Shemal tribal group to help them gain the throne. The Sheikh took the towns of Al Jazirah Al Hamra, Sharjah, Rams and Khor Fakkan (all in today's UAE). Said fought back, but was unable to regain these towns. However, the brothers felt it was safer to leave the country. Saif sailed for East Africa, intending to set himself up as a ruler there. He died there soon after. Sultan sailed to Gwadar on the Makran coast of Balochistan. The Khan of Kalat, Mir Nasir Khan I, granted him protection and gave him Gwadar. (Note: Gwadar would remain a possession of Oman until 1958, when it was sold back to Pakistan.)

Said bin Ahmad became increasingly unpopular. Around the end of 1785 a group of notables elected his brother, Qais bin Ahmad, as Imam. This revolt soon collapsed. In 1786 Said's son Hamad bin Said managed to get control of Muscat, with its fortress. One by one the other fortresses in Oman submitted to Hamad. Said no longer had any temporal power. Hamad took the title of Sheikh and established his court in Muscat. Said bin Ahmad remained in Rustaq and retained the title of Imam, but this was purely a symbolic religious title that carried no power. Hamad died in 1792.

== Reign ==
Sultan bin Ahmad, who had returned to Oman from Balochistan, took control in Muscat. To avoid family disputes, at a meeting in Barka he confirmed his brother Said as Imam in Rustaq, and he ceded control of Sohar to his brother Qais bin Ahmad. In 1798 Sultan made a treaty with the British East India Company. In 1800, Oman suffered from an invasion by Wahhabis from the north, who occupied the Buraimi oasis and besieged Sultan's brother Qais in Sohar.

Sultan died in 1804 on an expedition to Basra. He appointed Mohammed bin Nasir bin Mohammed al-Jabry as the Regent and guardian of his two sons, Salim bin Sultan and Said bin Sultan.
