= Hamad bin Said =

Sultan of Oman from 1786 to 1792

Sultan of Oman
- Reign: 1786–1792
- Predecessor: Said bin Ahmad
- Successor: Sultan bin Ahmad
- Died: 13 March 1792
- Dynasty: Al Bu Said

Hamad bin Said (died 13 March 1792) was the sultan of the Omani Empire from 1786 to 1792, he was the third member of the Al Bu Said dynasty to rule Oman. During his reign he moved the capital to Muscat, which has been maintained to the modern day.

== Reign ==
Hamad bin Said was the son of the Imam and Sultan Said bin Ahmad, who succeeded to those positions in 1783 on the death of his father, Ahmad bin Said al-Busaidi. Said bin Ahmad was increasingly unpopular. Around the end of 1785 a group of notables elected his brother, Qais bin Ahmad, as Imam. This revolt soon collapsed.

In 1786 Hamad bin Said managed to get control of Muscat, with its fortress. One by one the other fortresses in Oman submitted to Hamad. Said no longer had any temporal power. Hamad took the title of Sheikh and established his court in Muscat. His father, Said bin Ahmad, remained in Rustaq and retained the title of Imam, but this was purely a symbolic religious title that carried no power. His decision to move the capital of Oman from Rustaq to Muscat in 1784 has been maintained to the present day.

Hamad sought to take control of the important port cities of Mombasa and Bombay, but was unable to take over Mombasa. He expanded Omani trade influence across the northeast Indian Ocean, Indus River, and Afghanistan.

The Salah, a 50 gun Omani frigate, was caputred by French privateers in 1781. In response, Hamad arrested the crew of the La Philippine, which aided in the capture of the Salah, when it came to port at Muscat. The French ship Escurial was renamed the Salah and ceremonioally handed over to Oman in 1790 as a form of reparation.

Hamad died of smallpox in 1792, and was succeeded by his uncle, Sultan bin Ahmad.

== Works cited ==
=== Books ===
- Bresnahan, David (2025). Inland from Mombasa: East Africa and the Making of the Indian Ocean World. University of California Press. ISBN 9780520400481.
- Miles, Samuel Barrett (1919). The Countries and Tribes of the Persian Gulf. Garnet Pub. ISBN 978-1-873938-56-0.
- Phillips, Wendell (1967). Oman: A History. Reynal & Hitchcock.
- Thomas, Gavin (2011-11-01). The Rough Guide to Oman. Penguin. ISBN 978-1-4053-8935-8.
- Weiner, Scott (2022). Kinship, State Formation and Governance in the Arab Gulf States. Edinburgh University Press. ISBN 9781474488167.

=== Journals ===
- Lawson, Fred (1983). "Hegemony and the Structure of International Trade Reassessed: A View from Arabia". International Organization. 37 (2). MIT Press: 317–337. doi:10.2307/2706538. JSTOR 2706538.
