= Al-Mirani Fort =

Fort in Oman

Coordinates: 23°37′2″N 58°35′35″E

Fort Al-Mirani
- Muscat, Oman
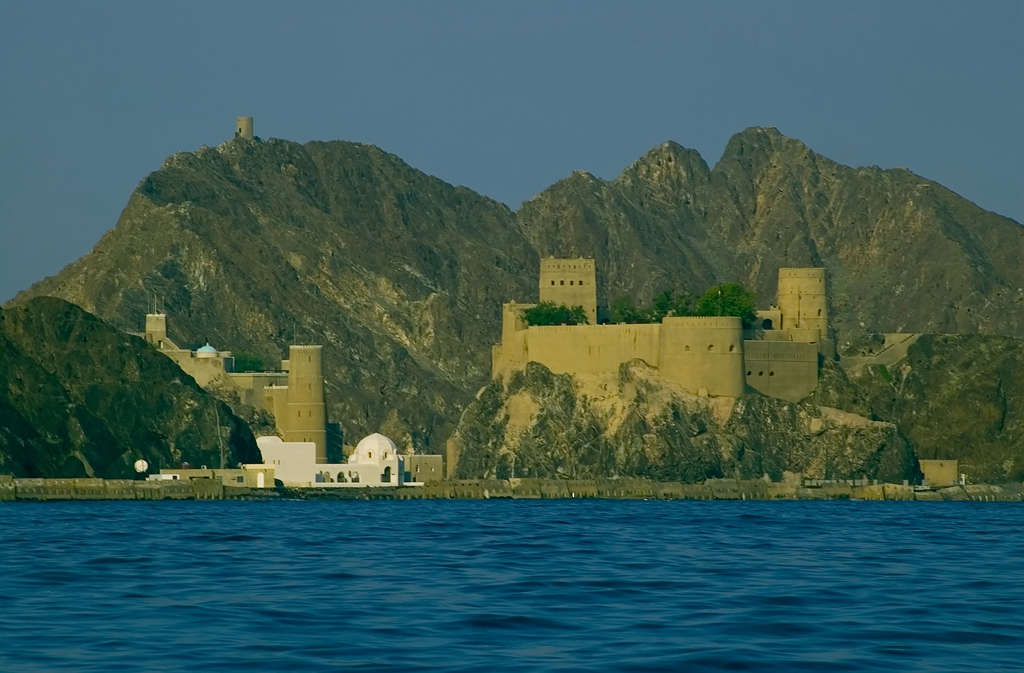
- Fort Al-Mirani (background right)

Site history
- Materials: Stone

Fort Al-Mirani (Arabic: قلعة الميراني) is a fort located in the harbor of the city of Old Muscat, Oman. The fort existed prior to the Portuguese invasion and was later rebuilt by the Portuguese in 1587. The fort became the first to use cannons in Oman.

== History ==
In the 1552 Capture of Muscat, an Ottoman force consisting of 4 galleons, 25 galleys, and 850 troops attacked the city of Muscat. They captured the city and its fort. The recently built Fort Al-Mirani was besieged for 18 days with one piece of Ottoman artillery brought on top of a ridge. The fort was captured and its fortifications destroyed.

== Gallery ==
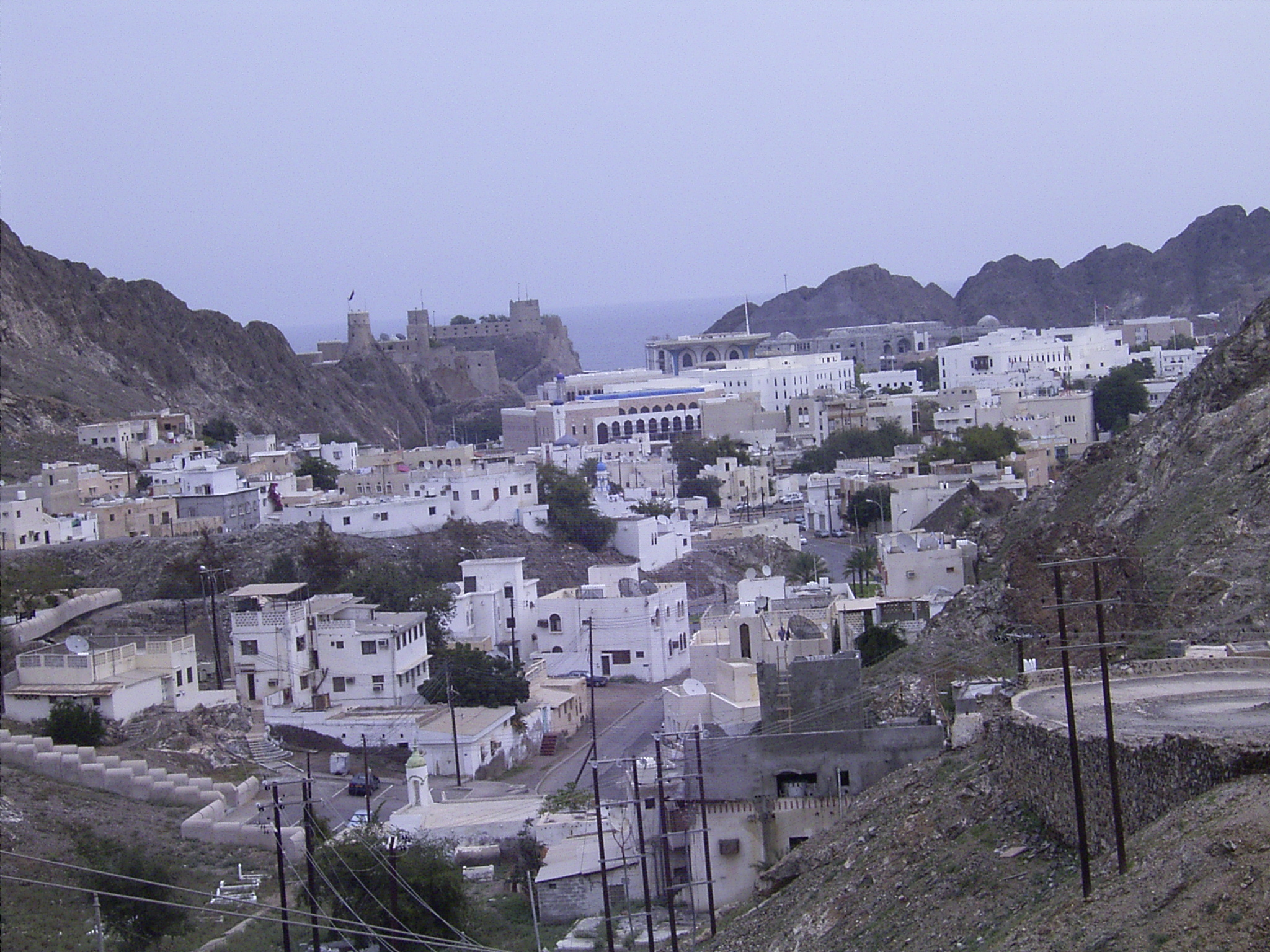
View of Muscat, with Fort Al Jalali and Fort Al Mirani.

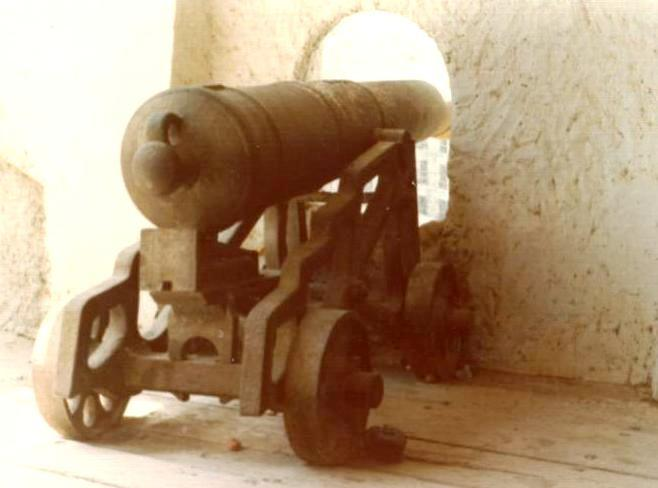
Fort of Al-Mirani: old piece of artillery.
