= Samuel Barrett Miles =

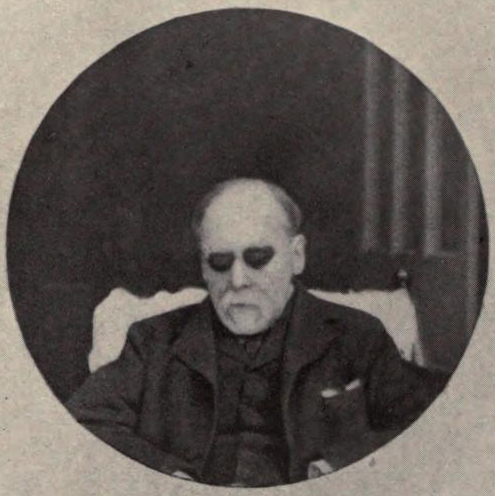
- Photograph from the frontispiece of The Countries and Tribes of the Persian Gulf
- Born: 2 October 1838
- Died: 28 August 1914 (aged 75)
- Occupation: Army officer
- Known for: Ethnographic and historical writings on Oman

Samuel Barrett Miles (2 October 1838 – 28 August 1914) was a British Army officer who served as a diplomat in various Arabic-speaking countries, notably Oman, which he came to know better than any other European of the time. The notes that he made were published after his death as The Countries and Tribes of the Persian Gulf.

== Early years ==
Samuel Barrett Miles was born on 2 October 1838, the son of Major-General William Miles and his wife Ann Hurd Barrett. His father was in the military service of the East India Company. Miles was educated at Harrow. He joined the British Indian Army in 1857, the year of the Indian Mutiny. He entered the 7th Regiment of Bombay Native Infantry as an ensign, was promoted to lieutenant in 1860 and became regimental quarter-master in 1864. In November 1866 he moved with his regiment to Aden. The next year he was appointed Cantonment Magistrate and Assistant Resident at Aden.

== Political agent in the Gulf region ==
The regiment returned to India in March 1869. Soon after, Miles applied for a transfer to the Political Service. His first appointment was to Balochistan, where he stayed on the Makran coast. Miles was appointed Political Agent and Consul at Muscat, in Oman, in October 1872. He spent most of his subsequent career as a political agent in Oman. Other appointments included Political Agent in Turkish Arabia, Consul-General of Baghdad (1879), Political Agent and Consul-General of Zanzibar (1881), Political Agent in the North West Province and Oudh (1885) and Political Resident in the Persian Gulf.

Miles came to Oman during the reign of Turki bin Said (1871–1888), whom the British had assisted in ending the conservative religious revolution of Azzan bin Qais. Miles made several journeys from Muscat into the interior of the country to gain a better understanding of the people for diplomatic purposes. He was an Arabist and Orientalist, and developed a deep knowledge of the history and the people of the region, recording his findings in copious notes. He described the country, architecture, local customs, social conditions, agriculture and fishing. His erudition allowed him to detect echoes of the distant past in modern times. He noted that India and Arabia still used a measure of weight that had been used in ancient Nineveh.

== Later career ==
Miles was acting Political Resident in the Gulf from 1885 until October 1886. In 1887 he returned to India where he was promoted to Colonel. He was Political Resident at Mewar from 1887 to 1893, when he retired from the army and returned to England. Miles wrote several papers that were published by the Royal Geographical Society.

He married Ellen Marie Kay, daughter of Sir Brook Kay, 3rd Baronet (1780-1866) in 1877. They had one son, Major Harry William Miles (17 October 1879 - 9 July 1917), who served in the Royal Marines and was killed during World War I (1914–1918) in the explosion of HMS Vanguard.

Samuel Barrett Miles died on 28 August 1914 aged 75. He had intended to work up his notes into a book, but went blind several years before he died. Five years later his widow published the work he had completed as The Countries and Tribes of the Persian Gulf.

== Bibliography ==
Published work by Samuel Barrett Miles include:

- Miles, Samuel Barrett (1873). "A brief Account of Four Arabian Works on the History and Geography of Arabia". Journal of the Royal Asiatic Society. 6: 20–27. doi:10.1017/s0035869x00016129. S2CID 162959349.
- Miles, Samuel Barrett (1877). "On the route between Sohar and El-Bereymi in Oman, with a note on the Zatt, or gypsies in Arabia". Journal of the Asiatic Society of Bengal.
- Miles, Samuel Barrett (1896). "Journal of an Excursion in Oman, in South-East Arabia". Geographical Journal. 7 (5): 522–537. doi:10.2307/1773995. JSTOR 1773995.
- Miles, Samuel Barrett (1901). "Across the Green Mountain of Oman". Geographical Journal. 18 (5): 465–478. doi:10.2307/1775021. JSTOR 1775021.
- Miles, Samuel Barrett (1986). "Memorandum on Geography of Oman". Persian Gulf Administration Reports. 1. Gerrards Cross: Archive Editions: 117–119.
- Miles, Samuel Barrett (1910). "On the Border of the Great Desert: A Journey in Oman [part II]". Geographical Journal. 36: 405–425. doi:10.2307/1777049. JSTOR 1777049.
- Miles, Samuel Barrett (1919). The Countries and Tribes of the Persian Gulf. Garnet & Ithaca Press. ISBN 978-1-873938-56-0.
- Tenets of the Ibadhi sect
- Outlines of the history of Oman, 1728–1883
- Note on the tribes of Oman
- Note on the sect of Ibadhiyah of Oman
