= Timeline of Muscat =

The following is a timeline of the history of the city of Muscat, Oman.

== Prior to 20th century ==
- 550 BCE – Achaemenids in power (approximate date).
- 100s CE – Migration of Arab tribes from Yemen.
- 633 CE – Regional Islamization.
- 696 CE – Umayyad army attempting to seize Muscat was defeated.
- 865 CE – Flood destroy a portion of the city.
- 1507 – City taken by Portuguese forces under command of Afonso de Albuquerque.
- 1522 – Uprising against Portuguese rule.
- 1546 – City bombarded by Ottoman ships without landing.
- 1552 – Capture of Muscat (1552) by Ottoman forces under Piri Reis for a brief period.
- 1581 – City pillaged by Ottomans under command of Piri Reis before withdrawing.
- 1586-1588 – Fort al-Jalali and Fort al-Mirani completed.
- 1624 – Construction begins of "earthen land wall" around city.
- 1640 – City attacked by forces of Nasir bin Murshid.
- 1648 – City besieged by Nasir ibn Murshid but Portuguese sued for peace.
- 1650 – City taken by forces of Sultan bin Saif; Portuguese ousted.
- 1670 – Dutch East India Company factory established.
- 1738 – Muscat occupied by forces of Muhammad Taqi Khan of Fars.
- 1740s – Ahmad bin Said al-Busaidi in power.
- 1792 – Albusaidi monarch Hamad ibn Said relocates the capital of Oman from Rustaq to Muscat.
- 1800 – British representative of the British East India Company takes residence in Muscat.
- 1806 – Said bin Sultan in power.
- 1832 – Capital of the Omani empire relocated from Muscat to colonial Zanzibar by Said bin Sultan.
- 1845 – Bait al-Falaj Fort built.
- 1856 – Thuwaini bin Said becomes sultan of the newly formed Sultanate of Muscat and Oman and his capital is Muscat.
- 1879 – The United States consulate is established in Muscat.
- 1890 – Cyclonic storm flooding kills 700 people.
- 1893 – Hospital established.
- 1894 – French consulate established.
- 1899 – Bubonic plague strikes at Muscat.

== 20th century ==
- 1928 – Al-Sa'idiyah School established.
- 1929 – Vehicular road into city built "by the hacking out of a one-lane track through the mountains."
- 1932 – Said bin Taimur becomes sultan.
- 1939 – Municipal council established.
- 1943 – Bombing of ship in harbor by Japanese forces.
- 1948 – Imperial Bank of Iran branch in business.
- 1949 – Municipal Law for the Sultanate of Muscat and Oman issued.
- 1951 – Indian consulate established.
- 1952 – Population: 4,200 in town (approximate estimate).
- 1960 – Population: 5,080 in town; 6,208 urban agglomeration (approximate estimate).
- 1962 – Muttrah-Muscat road paved.
- 1963 – Slavery abolished.
- 1967 – Petroleum Development Oman headquartered in Muscat.
- 1968 – Electric power plant commissioned in Riyam.
- 1970 – Qaboos bin Said al Said in power.
- 1972
  - June: Muttrah and Muscat merge to form the Muscat Municipality.
  - Al Alam Palace built.
- 1973
  - Seeb Airport opens.
  - British School – Muscat established.
- 1974
  - Port Sultan Qaboos built in Muttrah.
  - Museum of Omani Heritage opens.
- 1977 First oil painting exhibition by Gulshen Sleem at Al Falaj Hotel
- 1975
  - Office of municipality president established.
  - Times of Oman newspaper begins publication.
- 1981
  - Oman Daily Observer newspaper begins publication.
  - Ministry of Social Affairs and Labor and Ministry of Petroleum built.
- 1984 – Muscat Governorate established.
- 1985
  - Gulf Cooperation Council meets in Muscat.
  - Al-Bustan Palace Hotel in business.
  - Oman Natural History Museum opens.
- 1986 – Sultan Qaboos University opens.
- 1987 – Royal Hospital built.
- 1988
  - Muscat Securities Market established.
  - Alwatan newspaper in publication.
  - French embassy built.
- 1990 – Oman Children's Museum established.
- 1992 – Omani French Museum established.
- 1993
  - 40,856 in city.
  - Dam and Oman International Bank built.
  - Oman Society for Fine Arts established.
- 1995 – Oman Oil and Gas Exhibition Centre established.
- 1996 – National Hospitality Institute headquartered in city.
- 1998 – Bait al Zubair museum opens.

== 21st century ==
- 2001
  - Sultan Qaboos Grand Mosque built.
  - Muscat Gate Museum opens.
  - Population: 685,676 in governorate.
- 2006 – Bait Al Baranda (house museum) opened.
- 2010 – Al-Musannah Sports City opened.
- 2011
  - Royal Opera House Muscat opened in Shati Al-Qurm.
- 2012 – Muscat Expressway built.
- 2013 – Fish souk rebuilt.
- 2018
  - Swedish EDM producer Avicii died by suicide in Muscat.
  - Population: 315,443 (estimate).
- 2020
  - in January 2020, Haitham bin Tariq Al Said became the ruler of Oman after Sultan Qaboos died.
  - NOC (No Objection Certificate) abolished amidst COVID-19.

== See also ==
- Muscat history
- List of cities in Oman (also by population, in German)
- Old Muscat

== Bibliography ==
Published in 18th-19th centuries

- Carsten Niebuhr (1792). "Of the Province of Oman". Travels through Arabia. Translated by Robert Heron. Edinburgh: R. Morison and Son. hdl:2027/mdp.39015004297621. "Maskat"
- William Milburn (1813), "Muscat", Oriental Commerce: containing a geographical description of the principal places in the East Indies, China, and Japan, London: Black, Parry & Co., hdl:2027/uc2.ark:/13960/t1hh6sn82, OCLC 6856418
- Abraham Rees (1819), "Mascat", The Cyclopædia, London: Longman, Hurst, Rees, Orme & Brown, hdl:2027/mdp.39015057241120
- James Horsburgh (1852). "Arabia, N.E. Coast: Muscat". India Directory: Or, Directions for Sailing to and from the East Indies, China, Australia, and the Interjacent Ports of Africa and South America (6th ed.). London: William H. Allen & Co.
- Grattan Geary (1878), "Muscat", Through Asiatic Turkey, London: S. Low, Marston, Searle & Rivington, OCLC 4918876
- Edward Balfour (1885), "Muscat", Cyclopaedia of India (3rd ed.), London: B. Quaritch, hdl:2027/mdp.39015068611014

Published in 20th century

- "Muscat", Chambers's Encyclopaedia, London: W. & R. Chambers, 1901, hdl:2027/uc2.ark:/13960/t3bz6g65j
- John Gordon Lorimer (1908). Gazetteer of the Persian Gulf. Calcutta. pp. 1364–1425. hdl:2027/uc1.l0061307658.
- Benjamin Vincent (1910), "Muscat", Haydn's Dictionary of Dates (25th ed.), London: Ward, Lock & Co., hdl:2027/loc.ark:/13960/t89g6g776
- Fred Scholz [in German] (1990). Muscat, Sultanat Oman: geographische Skizze einer einmaligen arabischen Stadt [Muscat, Sultanate of Oman: geographical sketch of a unique Arabian city] (in German). Berlin: Das arabische Buch. ISBN 978-3-923446-58-2.
- Noelle Watson, ed. (1996). "Muscat". International Dictionary of Historic Places: Middle East and Africa. UK: Routledge. p. 529. ISBN 1884964036.
- Abdelhamid Mahmoud Hussein Nasr (1997). Musqat asimat Oman (in Arabic). Irbid.

Published in 21st century

- Clifford Edmund Bosworth, ed. (2007). "Muscat". Historic Cities of the Islamic World. Leiden: Koninklijke Brill. pp. 417–419. ISBN 978-9004153882.
- J.E. Peterson (2007). "Chronology". Historical Muscat. Brill. p. 117+. ISBN 978-90-04-15266-3.
- Angie Turner (2008), "Muscat", in Michael R.T. Dumper; Bruce E. Stanley (eds.), Cities of the Middle East and North Africa, USA: ABC-CLIO, pp. 262–264, ISBN 9781576079195
- J.E. Peterson (2014). "Muscat as a Port City". In Lawrence G. Potter (ed.). The Persian Gulf in Modern Times: People, Ports, and History. Palgrave Macmillan. p. 153+. ISBN 978-1-137-48577-9.
