= Matthew Tai =

Chinese entrepreneur

- Tai Chi-Yip
- Born: 1982 (age 43–44); Hong Kong
- Education: Hong Kong University of Science and Technology, University of Hong Kong
- Occupations: Entrepreneur, investor
- Known for: Founder of JM Enigma Capital and ADX Technology

Matthew Tai (Tai Chi-Yip, Traditional Chinese: 戴志業) is a Hong Kong entrepreneur and investor, founder and current CEO of JM Enigma Capital and ADX Technology.

== Education and early experience ==
Matthew Tai was born in Hong Kong and studied at Wah Yan College, Hong Kong in his early years. He received bachelor's degree in Economics and Finance from the Business School of the Hong Kong University of Science and Technology, and was an exchange student at the School of Economics of Peking University.

He has later received a Master of Laws at the University of Hong Kong, majoring in international arbitration and commercial contractual law, and further received a degree in Master of Business Administration from Judge Business School, Cambridge University.

== Career ==
After graduation, Matthew Tai worked in strategy analysis and participated in corporate mergers and acquisitions. He then devoted himself to the family business and investment business, managing the family business's hedge fund, startup investment and real estate projects, and gradually expanding the business focus from traditional industries to financial technology and cross-regional investment.

Since the 2010s, it has been involved in promoting JM Enigma Capital's shift from real estate-related investments to diversified asset allocation, including technology investments and Southeast Asian market layout.

In 2016, Matthew Tai was awarded with the title of Dato’ Seri in Malaysia for his contribution to transnational economic and trade cooperation in Southeast Asia . At the same time, he devoted himself to community service in Hong Kong, participated in the work of the Hong Kong SAR Government Chinese Committees Association, and devoted himself to volunteer service in the Hong Kong St. John Ambulance Brigade that he was commended in 2020.

In the 2020s, Matthew Tai led JM Enigma Capital to start paying attention to the field of blockchain technology and digital assets, and explored the application model of digital assets in the cultural industry. He also advocated to apply international arbitration law for inter-continental blockchain transaction, and proclaimed the substantial application value of blockchain and its algorithm and application in artificial intelligence. He participated in the issuance of China Cultural Digital Asset NFT 2.0, established a digital asset trading and settlement company to apply for a Hong Kong stablecoin license, and planned to use stablecoins as digital currency for art trading and settlement to promote Hong Kong's art and cultural relic transactions. In 2025, his team launched the Draconis Blockchain and collaborated with the National Museum of Oman to plan a series of art and antique exhibitions, including Oman's first auction event aimed at collectors in the Middle East and around the world 。
