= Muscat Gate Museum =

Coordinates: 23°37′03″N 58°35′13″E

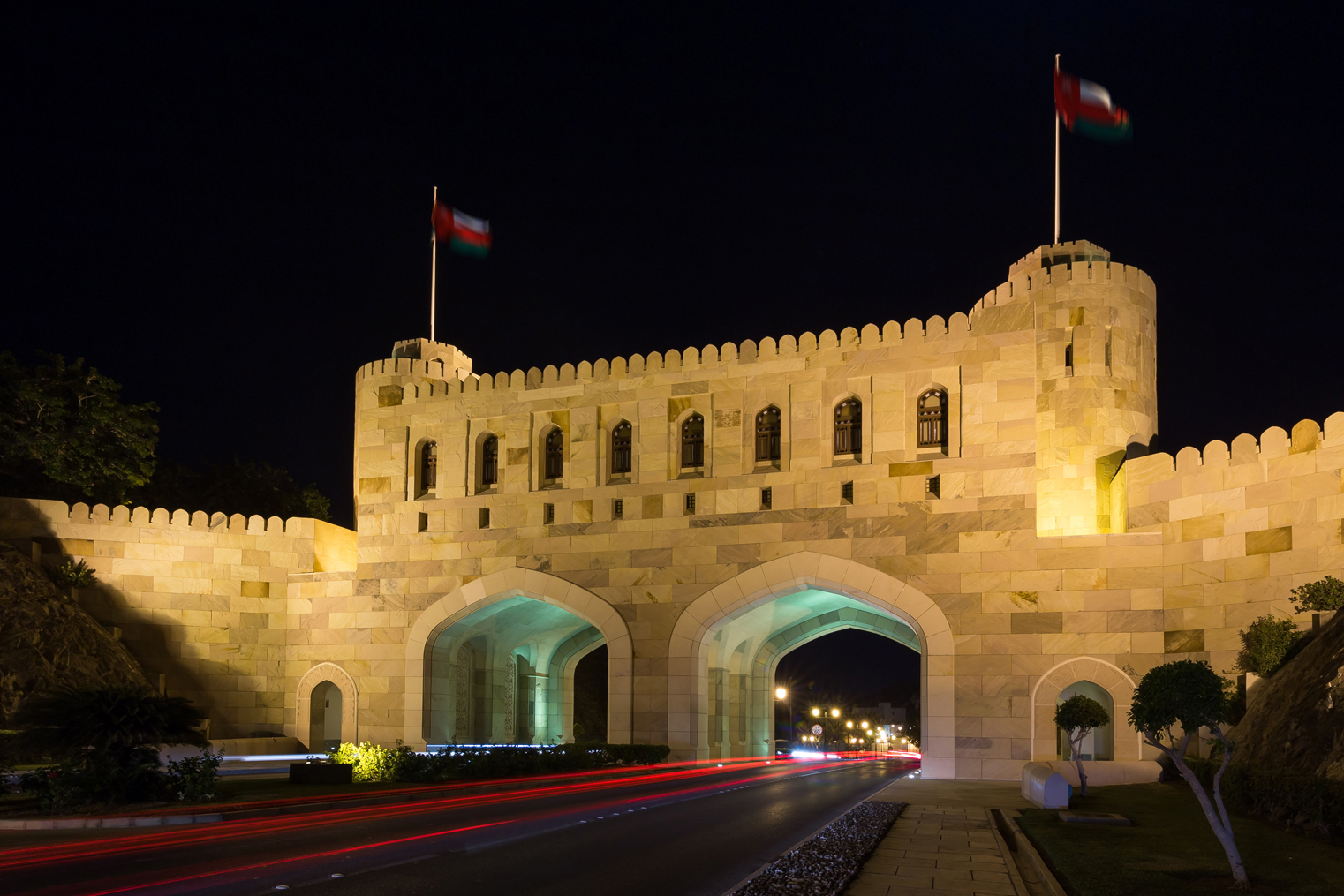
- Muscat Gate Museum at night
- Established: January 2001
- Location: Al Saidiya Street, Muscat, Oman
- Type: History museum

The Muscat Gate Museum is a history museum located above the Muscat Modern Gate on Al Saidiya Street in Old Muscat, Oman. The structure housing the museum was built in 1995 at the entrance to Old Muscat; the gates of the former walled city were historically closed before sundown.

Opened in January 2001, the museum presents Oman's history from the Neolithic period to the present, with particular emphasis on the development of Muscat from a commercial port into a modern capital. Its exhibits cover the aflaj irrigation systems, traditional architecture, water springs, wells, underground channels, souqs, houses, mosques, harbours and forts.

== See also ==
- List of museums in Oman
