= List of museums in Oman =

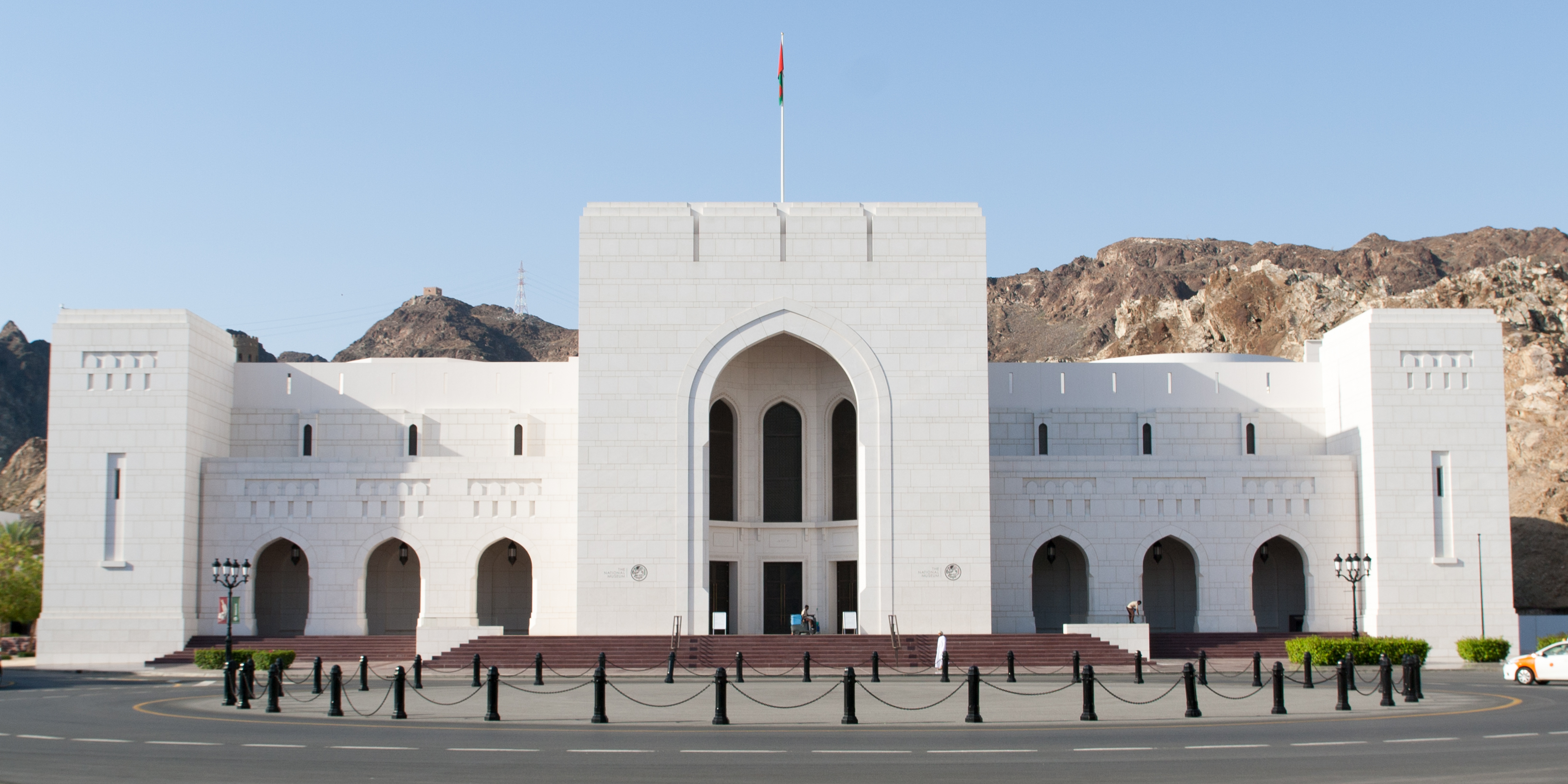
National Museum of Oman

This is a list of museums in Oman.

Museums in Oman cover subjects including archaeology, cultural heritage, natural history, science and military history.

- Bait al Zubair
- Land of Frankincense Museum
- Muscat Gate Museum
- Museum of Omani Heritage
- National Museum of Oman
- Oman Children's Museum
- Oman Natural History Museum
- Oman Oil and Gas Exhibition Centre
- Omani Aquarium and Marine Science and Fisheries Centre
- Omani French Museum
- Sultan's Armed Forces Museum
- Oman Across Ages Museum
- Bait Al Baranda Museum
- Sayyid Faisal bin Ali Museum
- Sohar Fort Museum
- Currency Museum, Muscat

== See also ==
- List of museums
- Tourism in Oman
- History of Oman
- Culture of Oman
