= Mouza Sulaiman Mohamed Al-Wardi =

Omani curator

- موزة سليمان محمد الوردي
- Other name: Moza Al Wardi
- Citizenship: Oman
- Education: Curtin University
- Employer: National Museum (Oman)

Mouza Sulaiman Mohamed Al-Wardi (Arabic: موزة سليمان محمد الوردي) is a curator and historian from Oman, who specialises in the history of silverworking in the Oman region.

== Career ==
Al-Wardi is a curator at the National Museum of Oman. She joined the museum in 2009 as Chief Curator during its construction and development. She is a specialist in historical metal-working, in particular in bronze and silver. She is an expert on the history of silversmithing, particularly in Oman, which has a historic tradition of women working as silversmiths, particularly in southern Oman in Dhofar. The project is a collaboration between Aude Mongiatti (British Museum), Fahmida Suleman (Royal Ontario Museum), Marcia Dorr and Al-Wardi. As part of this work she has studied the coinage that circulated in Oman and in particular its re-use into coin pendants. Al-Wardi has also worked on the Diba Hoard, an assemblage of stone vessels and bronze metalwork dating to 1200 - 300 BCE.

In 2013 she was a candidate on the British Museum's International Training Programme. She previously studied for a BA degree in Heritage and Cultural Studies from Curtin University (formally known as Western Australian Institute of Technology) in Perth. After graduation she worked at the Museum of Omani Heritage, developing training programmes and working on their heritage craft programme. In 2018 she was part of a UNESCO-hosted regional event in Kuwait, which focussed on the development of national museums.
