= Old Muscat =

Historic capital of Oman

Coordinates: 23°36′50″N 58°35′38″E

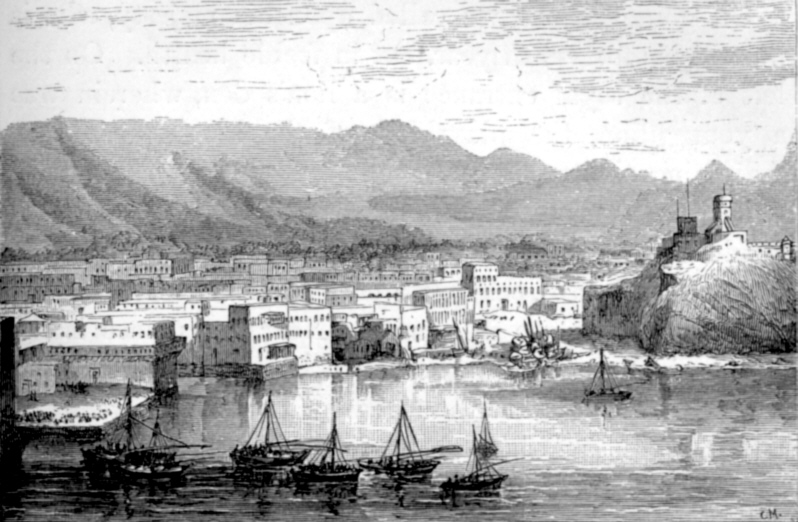
Historic view of Old Muscat in 1876

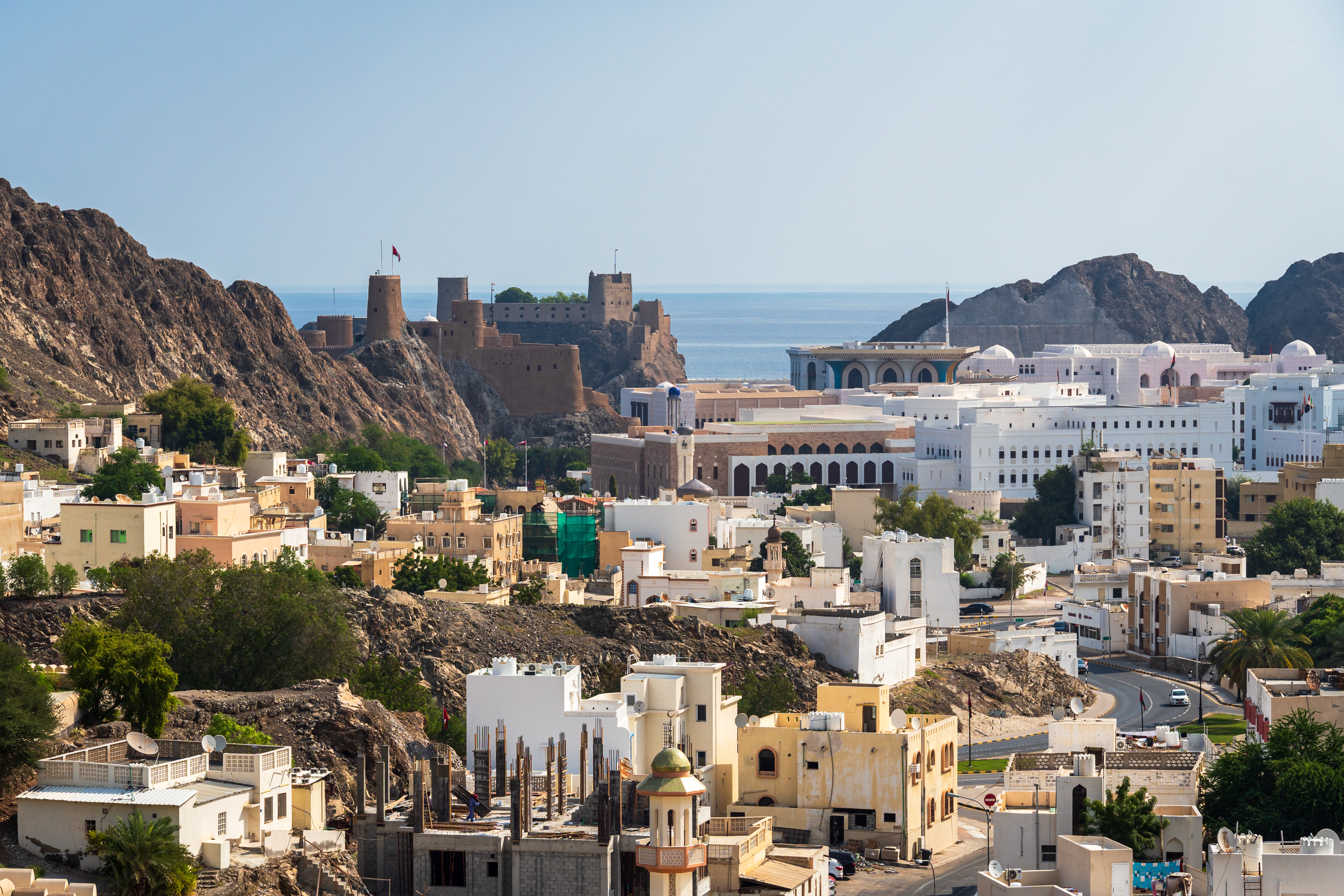
Modern view of Old Muscat from the mountain road

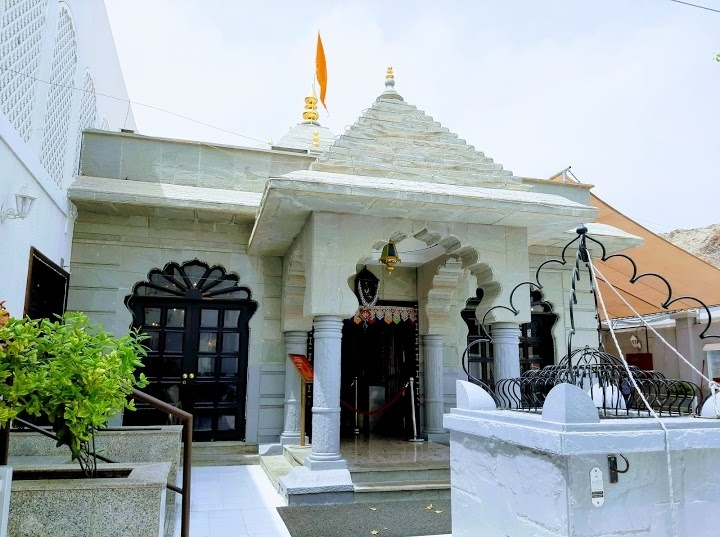
Shiva temple in Old Muscat is one of the oldest Hindu temples in the Middle East

Old Muscat is the original historic city of Muscat, the capital of Oman, on the coast in the Gulf of Oman.

== Overview ==
The old city of Muscat is separated from the rest of modern Muscat by coastal mountains. It is located along the Muttrah Corniche coastal road (entering via the Muscat Gate Museum) between Port Sultan Qaboos and Al Bustan Beach. The city is protected by a wall with round towers, built in 1625, on the western and southern sides. The Gulf of Oman and the surrounding mountains form a natural boundary to the east and north. Until the mid-20th century, the gates were closed three hours after dusk. Anyone on the streets after this time had to carry a lantern with them. In addition, smoking was banned on the main streets and the public playing of music was also banned.

== Tourism ==
Tourist attractions in Old Muscat include:

- Al Alam Palace
- Al Saidiya Street
- Bait Al Zubair
- Fort Al Jalali
- Fort Al-Mirani
- Muscat Gate Museum
- The National Museum
- Omani French Museum

== See also ==
- Capture of Muscat (1552)
- Muttrah, including the Muttrah Souq
- Port Sultan Qaboos
- Timeline of Muscat, Oman
- Sultan Haitham City
