= Omani Aquarium and Marine Science and Fisheries Centre =

Coordinates: 23.58067°N 58.60660°E

- Established: 1986
- Location: Muscat, Oman
- Type: Marine museum
- Directors: Ministry of Fisheries, Sultan Qaboos University

Omani Aquarium and Marine Science and Fisheries Centre is an aquacultural museum, located between the Al Bustan Palace Hotel and the Capital Yacht near Sidab Muscat in Muscat, Oman.

The museum was established in 1986. It has collaborated with Sultan Qaboos University to increase knowledge and studying of a wide range of marine species with particular emphasis on ecosystem conservation and preservation of endangered species, such as turtles. The aquarium has a wide range rich and unique marine life taken from the 3,165-kilometer coastline.

== See also ==
- List of museums in Oman
