= Al Saidiya Street =

Street in Muscat, Oman

Al Saidiya is a street in Old Muscat, Oman. The street is 5.05 km long.

== Nearby places and buildings ==
This is a list of popular places that lie on Al Saidiya Street.

Palaces

- Al Alam Palace

Government buildings

- Majlis- al Shura building

Museums

- Bait al Zubair
