= Museum of Omani Heritage =

Coordinates: 23.6098°N 58.4705°E

- Established: 1974
- Dissolved: 2016
- Location: Muscat, Oman
- Type: Heritage museum

The Museum of Omani Heritage, also known as the Oman Museum, was a museum in Muscat, Oman. Established in 1974, it was the first museum in the Sultanate. Its displays combined historical, archaeological and contemporary objects representing Omani cultural heritage. In July 2016, the newly opened National Museum of Oman superseded the original museum.

== See also ==
- List of museums in Oman

== Former curators ==
- Mouza Sulaiman Mohamed Al-Wardi
