= Oman Oil and Gas Exhibition Centre =

Oil and gas museum in Muscat, Oman

Coordinates: 23.6251°N 58.5086°E

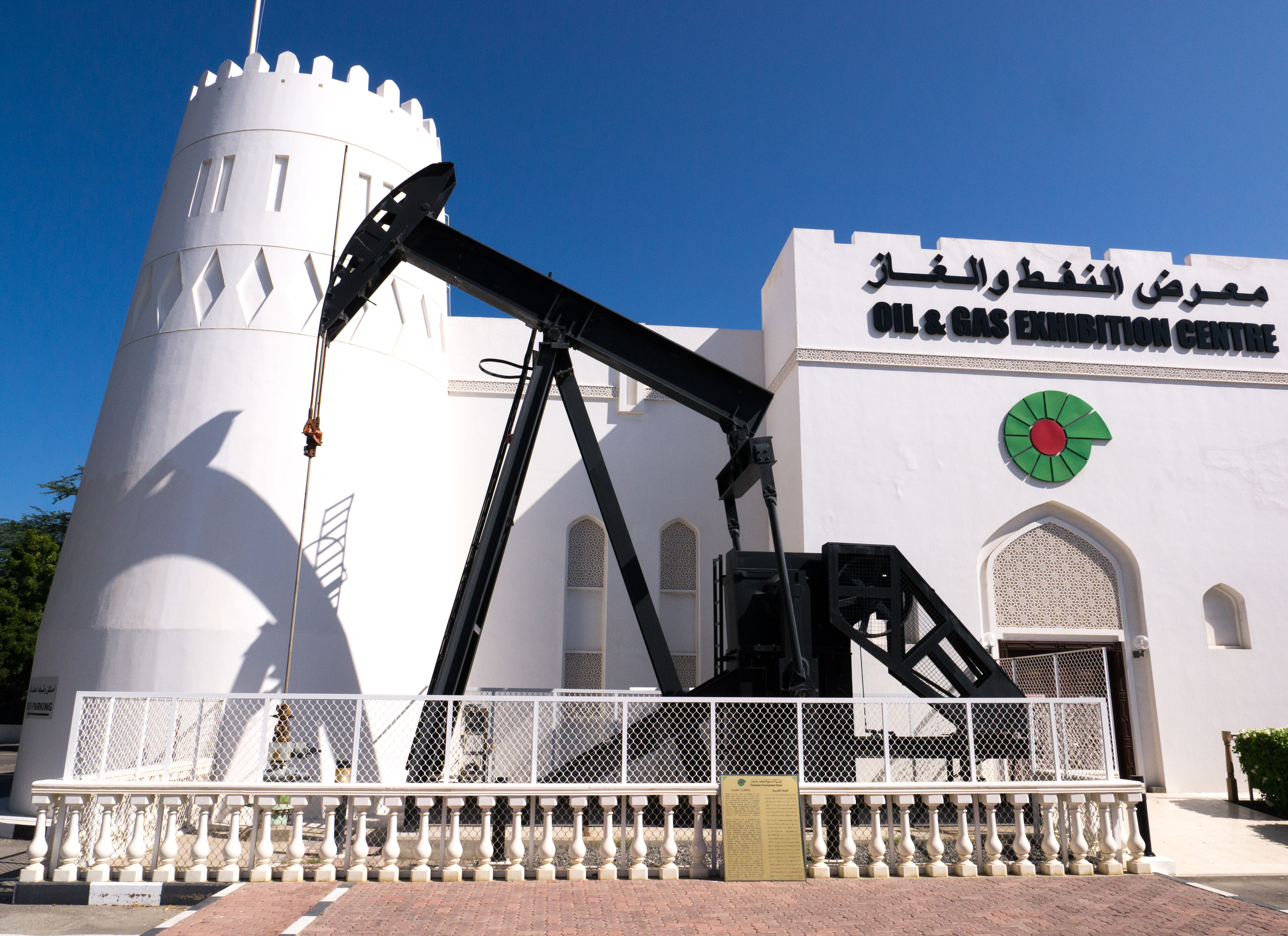
- Oil & Gas Exhibition Centre in 2013
- Established: 1995
- Location: Seih Al Maleh Street, Al-Qurum, Muscat, Oman
- Type: Oil and gas museum

The Oman Oil and Gas Exhibition Centre is an oil and gas museum located on Seih Al Maleh Street in Al-Qurum, Muscat, Oman. It was established in 1995 as a gift from Petroleum Development Oman (PDO) to the nation. Its exhibits explain the discovery, extraction and use of fossil fuels in Oman.

The PDO Planetarium, built in 2000, is located next to the centre.

== See also ==
- List of museums in Oman
- List of petroleum museums
