= Omani French Museum =

- Established: January 29, 1992
- Location: Lane 9310, Qasr Al Alam Street, Muscat, Oman
- Coordinates: 23.6149°N 58.5917°E
- Type: Omani-French heritage museum.
- Directors: Ministry of Heritage and Culture

The Omani French Museum is a heritage museum located in the former residence of the French consul, Bait Faransa on Lane 9310, Qasr Al Alam Street, in Old Muscat, Oman.

The white building, which was essentially a palace, was initially established as a present by the sultan Assayed / Faisal bin Turki to the French consul in Muscat in 1896. On January 29, 1992, Sultan Qaboos bin Said and the late French president François Mitterrand established a museum in the palace to preserve the historical Omani-French relations. The museum has a substantial collection of items to this effect, including photographs of the early French diplomats, historical documents, Omani - French ships, Omani and French costumes and jewellery and furniture.

== See also ==
- List of museums in Oman
