= Oman Children's Museum =

Children's human science museum in Muscat, Oman

Coordinates: 23.6159°N 58.4808°E

- Established: 1990
- Location: Sultan Qaboos Street, Muscat Oman
- Type: Children's cultural and science center

The Oman Children's Museum, now known as the Children's Culture Center, is a cultural and science center for children in Muscat, Oman. It is located on Sultan Qaboos Street near Qurum Nature Park and provides educational activities in science, technology, engineering, culture and the arts. The center is housed in a distinctive building consisting of two domes and covering approximately 2,000 square metres.

The museum was established by the Ministry of National Heritage and Culture and opened on November 14, 1990, by Sultan Qaboos bin Said al Said on the 20th National Day celebration in Oman. The museum has 45 exhibits and two demonstrations and comprises 10,000 square feet (930 m^{2}). It was the first science museum in Oman and is visited by around 50,000 visitors annually.

The center serves children and adolescents aged 6–16 through programs in culture, science, technology, engineering, arts and sports. It also includes the STEMazone hall, which offers interactive workshops aimed at developing creative thinking and technical skills. A dedicated STEMazone Centre was launched at the museum in 2021 in partnership with the Ministry of Education and the Ministry of Culture, Sports and Youth.

The museum addresses the scientific ways of human life and the exhibition section is divided into three parts; The Human life, Physics and observation which investigates the progression of science through the ages.

The museum has many hands-on displays. These include experiences of a fake electric shock, trigger a lightning bolt, launching a hot air balloon, photographing your own shadow, and sending message through a whisper dish.

== See also ==
- List of museums in Oman
