= Bait Al Zubair =

Ethnographic museum in Muscat, Oman

Coordinates: 23.6155°N 58.5921°E

Bait Al Zubair بيت الزبير
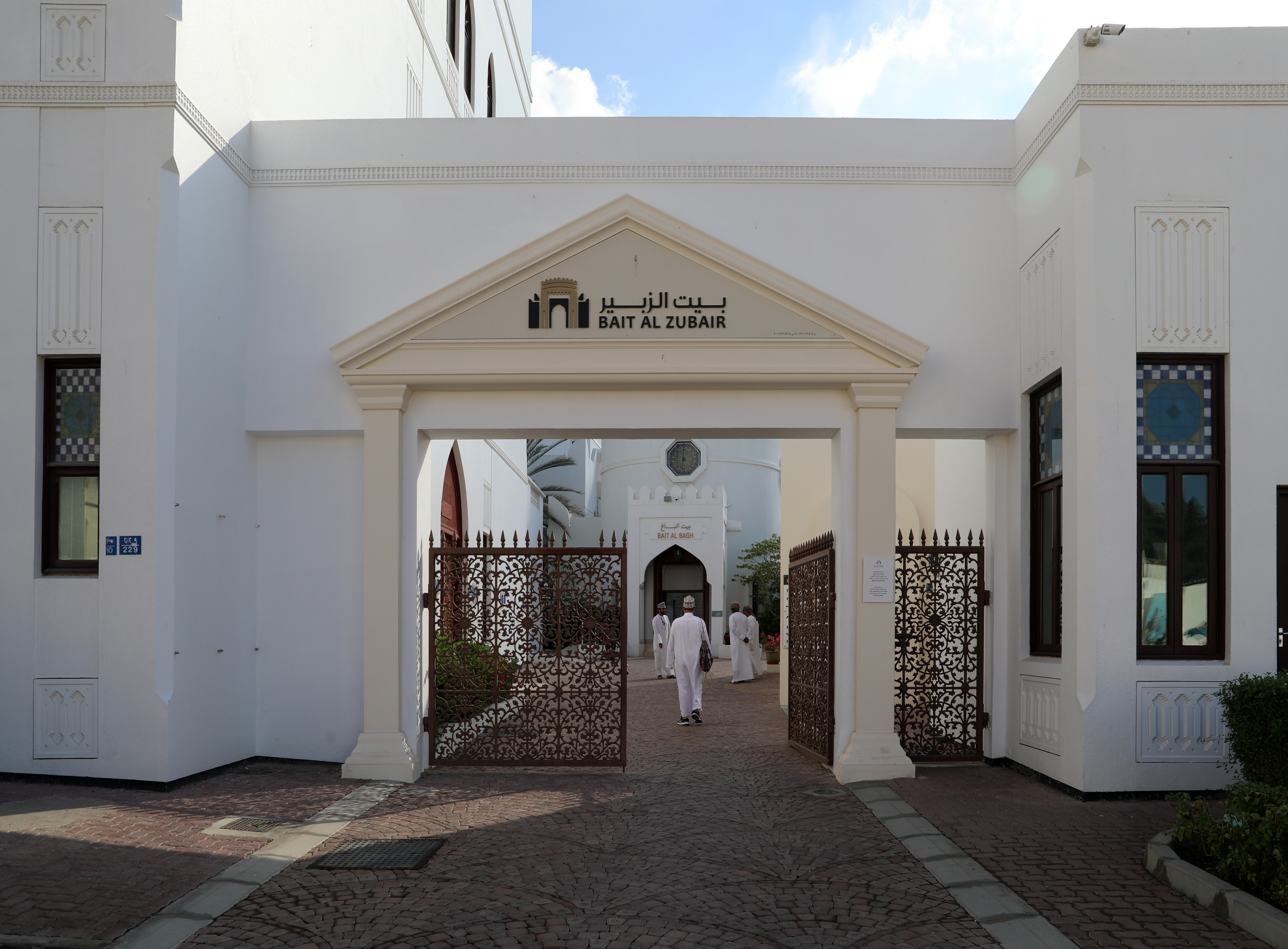
- Entrance of the museum
- Location: Al Saidiya Street, Muscat, Oman
- Website: www.baitalzubairmuseum.com

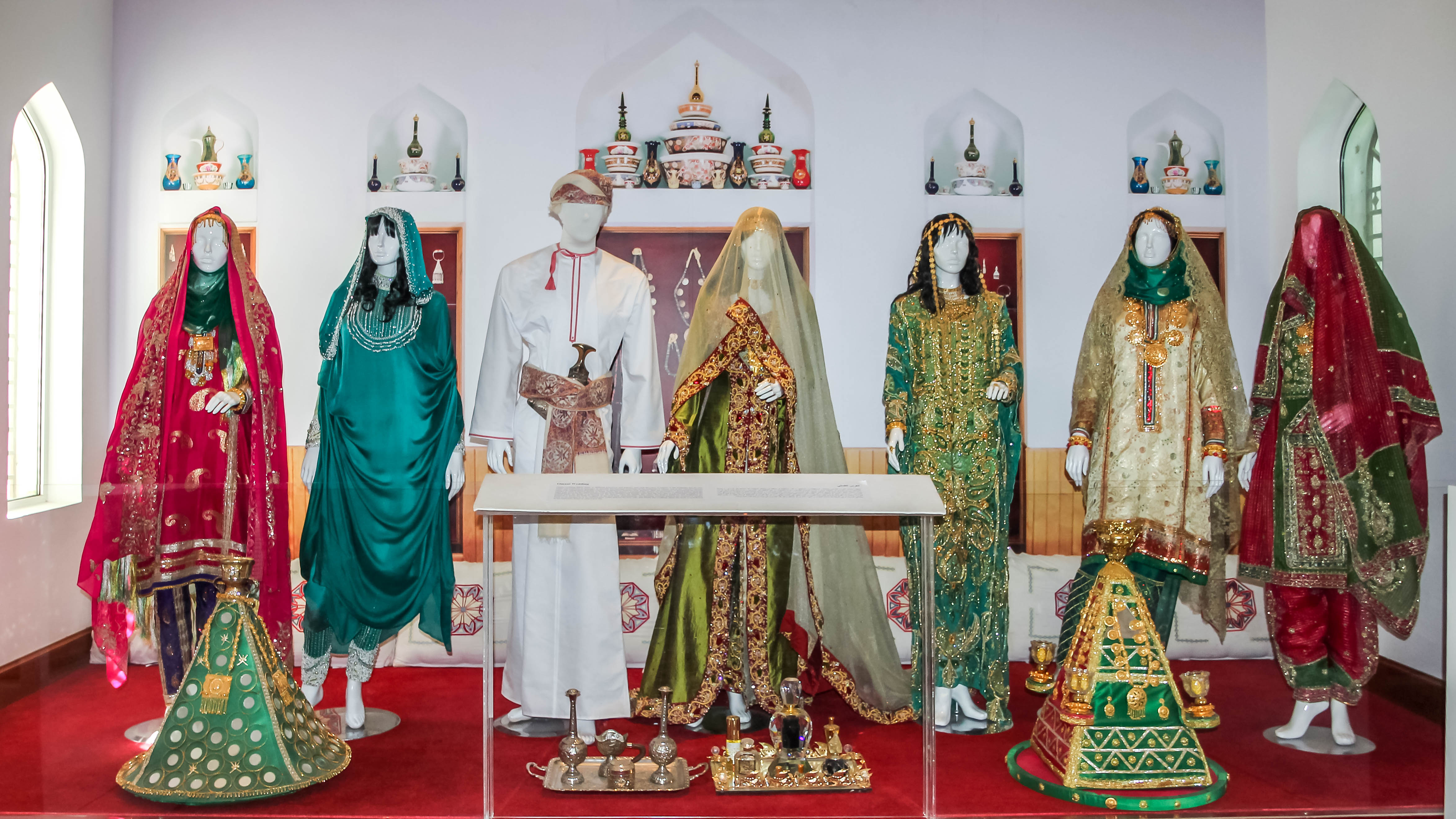
exhibition room

Bait Al Zubair is a museum located on Al Saidiya Street, Old Muscat, Oman.

The museum has an extensive collection of ancient weapons, including khanjar, household equipments, and costumes (most of which come from the owner's private collection). In the museum's garden there is a scale-model Omani village.

== See also ==
- List of museums in Oman
