= National Museum (Oman) =

Museum in Old Muscat opened in 2016

National Museum of Oman
- المتحف الوطني
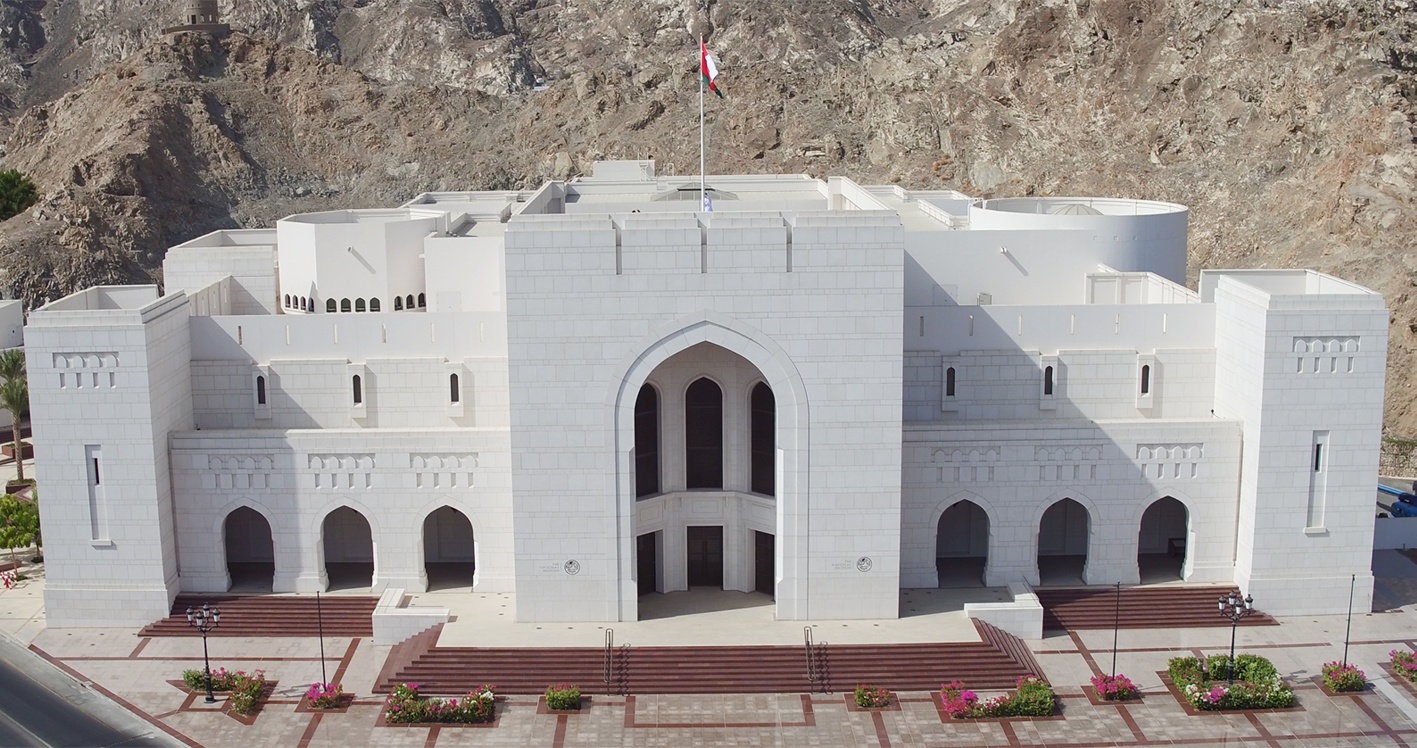
- The National Museum of Oman
- Established: 2013
- Location: Old Muscat, Oman
- Type: National museum
- Collection size: 5,466 objects
- Website: www.nm.gov.om

The National Museum of the Sultanate of Oman is located in Old Muscat, Oman. It was developed as a result of a ten-year collaboration between the Ministry of Heritage and Culture, the Royal Estate Affairs of Oman, Jasper Jacob Associates (J.J.A.), and Arts Architecture International Ltd (A.A.I.), and opened to the public in 2016.

== Background ==
The museum was established by a royal decree in 2013 and opened on July 30, 2016. It was designed to be the Sultanate's flagship cultural institution, showcasing the nation's heritage from the earliest human settlement in the Oman Peninsula some two million years ago through to the present day.

== Collection ==
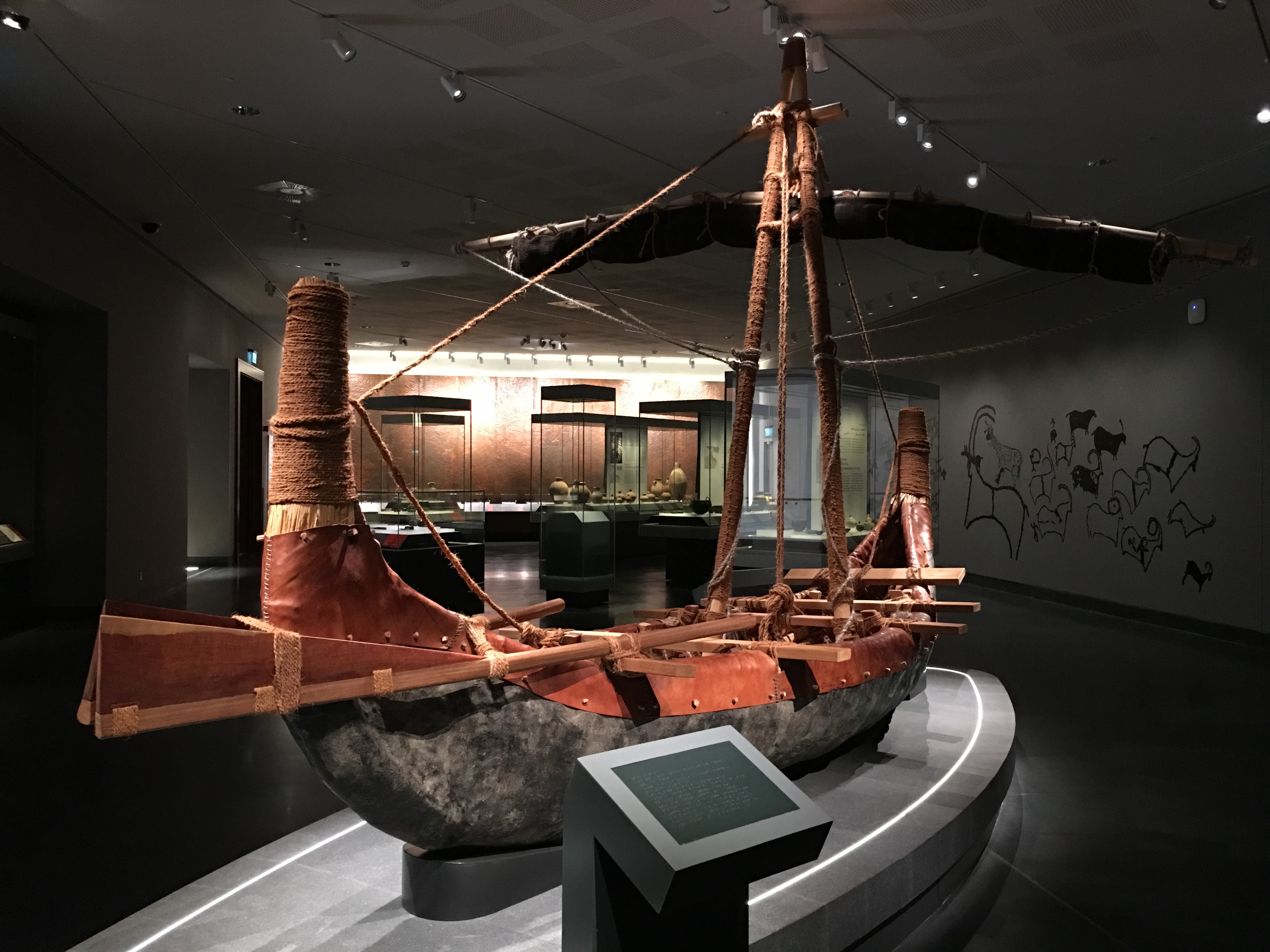
A model of a Magan boat constructed in Oman in 2012.

The National Museum houses 5,466 objects, among them an internationally significant collection of prehistoric metallic artifacts. Its curator, Mouza Sulaiman Mohamed Al-Wardi, is part of an international team exploring the legacy of Oman's silverwork tradition, where historically women were also silversmiths.

The museum is equipped with infrastructure for 43 digital immersive experiences, a learning center, conservation facilities, an ultra-high-definition cinema, and discovery areas for children. It adopted the region's first open-plan museum storage concept, where visitors learn about the various processes that artifacts go through before they are put on display. It features an integrated infrastructure for special needs and is the first museum in the Middle East to adopt Arabic Braille script for the visually impaired.

== Building ==
The museum is in a purpose-designed building in the heart of Muscat. The total area of the building is 13,700 square metres (147,000 sq ft), including 4,000 square metres (43,000 sq ft) allocated for 14 permanent galleries. A further 400 square metres (4,300 sq ft) are allocated for temporary exhibitions.

=== Galleries ===
The museum’s permanent exhibitions are arranged across 14 galleries, with 4,000 square metres allocated to permanent gallery space and a further 400 square metres used for temporary exhibitions. The galleries cover themes including the land and people of Oman, maritime history, arms and armour, civilisation, aflaj irrigation systems, currency, prehistory and ancient history, Islamic art and culture, Oman’s relations with the wider world, the Renaissance period, and intangible heritage.

The galleries are distributed across the ground and first floors. The ground floor includes the Land and the People Gallery, Maritime History Gallery, Arms and Armour Gallery, Civilisation in the Making Gallery, Aflaj Gallery, Currency Gallery, and Timeline Gallery. The first floor includes the Prehistory and Ancient History Galleries, Splendours of Islam Gallery, Oman and the World Gallery, The Renaissance Gallery, Intangible Heritage Gallery, and Collections Gallery. The museum also lists facilities such as a Learning Centre, conservation facilities, a temporary exhibitions gallery, a collections gallery based on an open-storage concept, a café, and a gift shop.

Building and facilities	
Total plot area	24000 m^{2}
Total building area	13700 m^{2}
Total gallery area	4000 m^{2}
Number of galleries	14
Permanent Galleries	The Land and the People Maritime History Arms and Armour Civilisation in the Making Aflaj Currency Timeline Bat, al-Khutm and al-Ayn Land of Frankincense Prehistory and Ancient History Splendours of Islam Oman and the World The Renaissance Intangible Heritage
Other facilities	Learning Centre Conservation Facilities Temporary Exhibitions Gallery Collections Gallery (Open Storage Concept) Café Gift Shop

=== Images ===
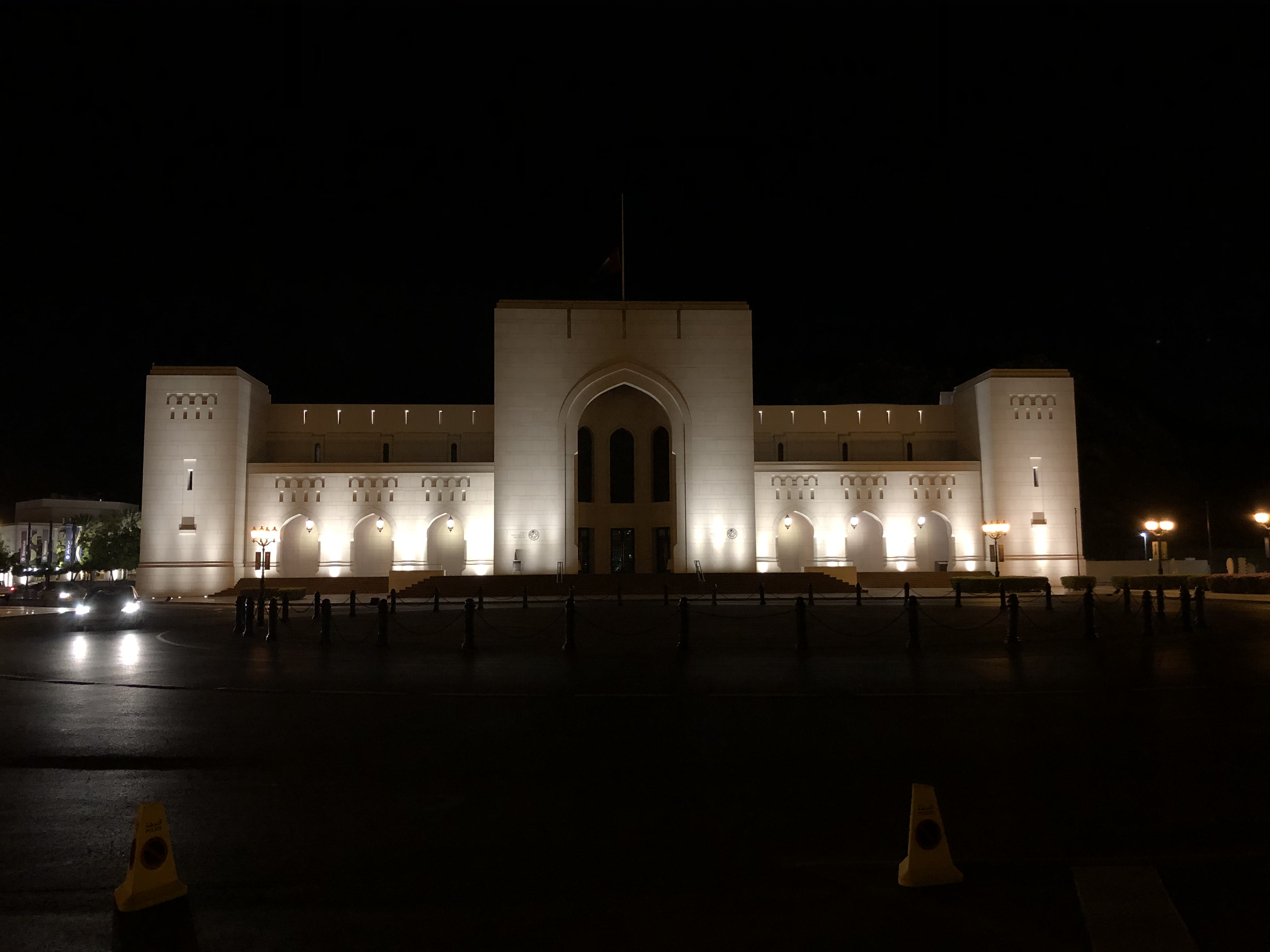
Museum at night.

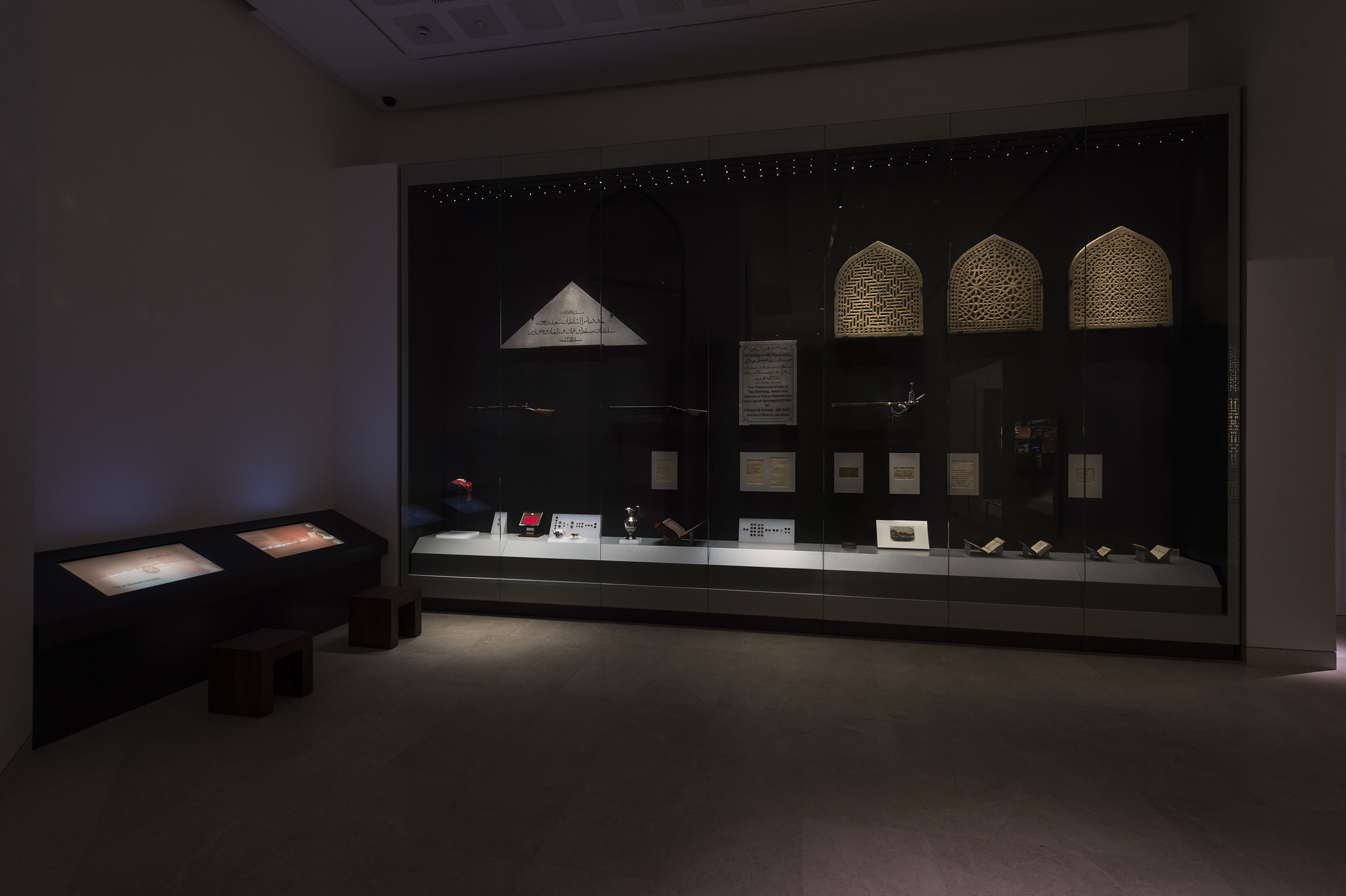
Renaissance Gallery

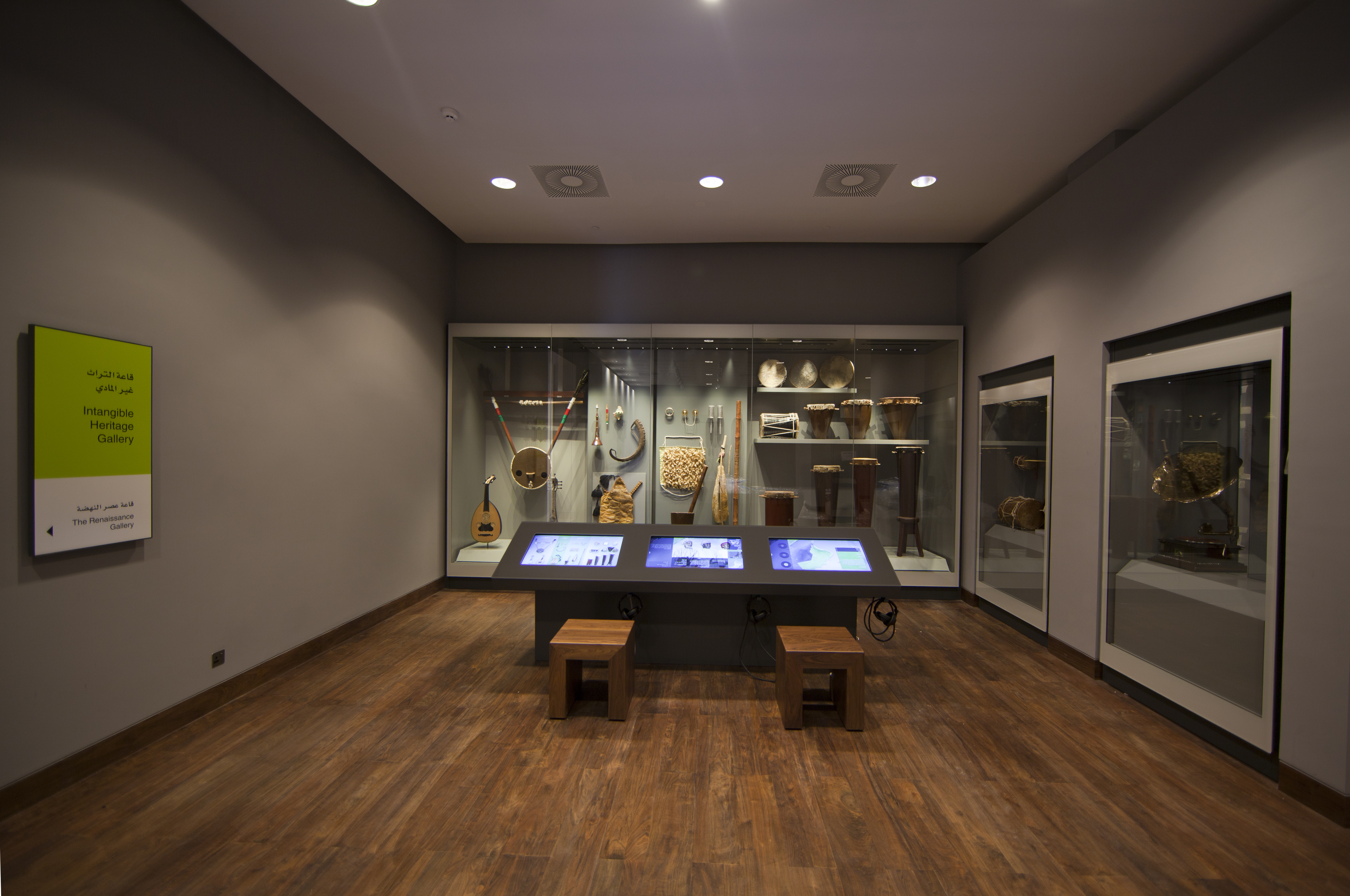
Intangible Heritage Gallery

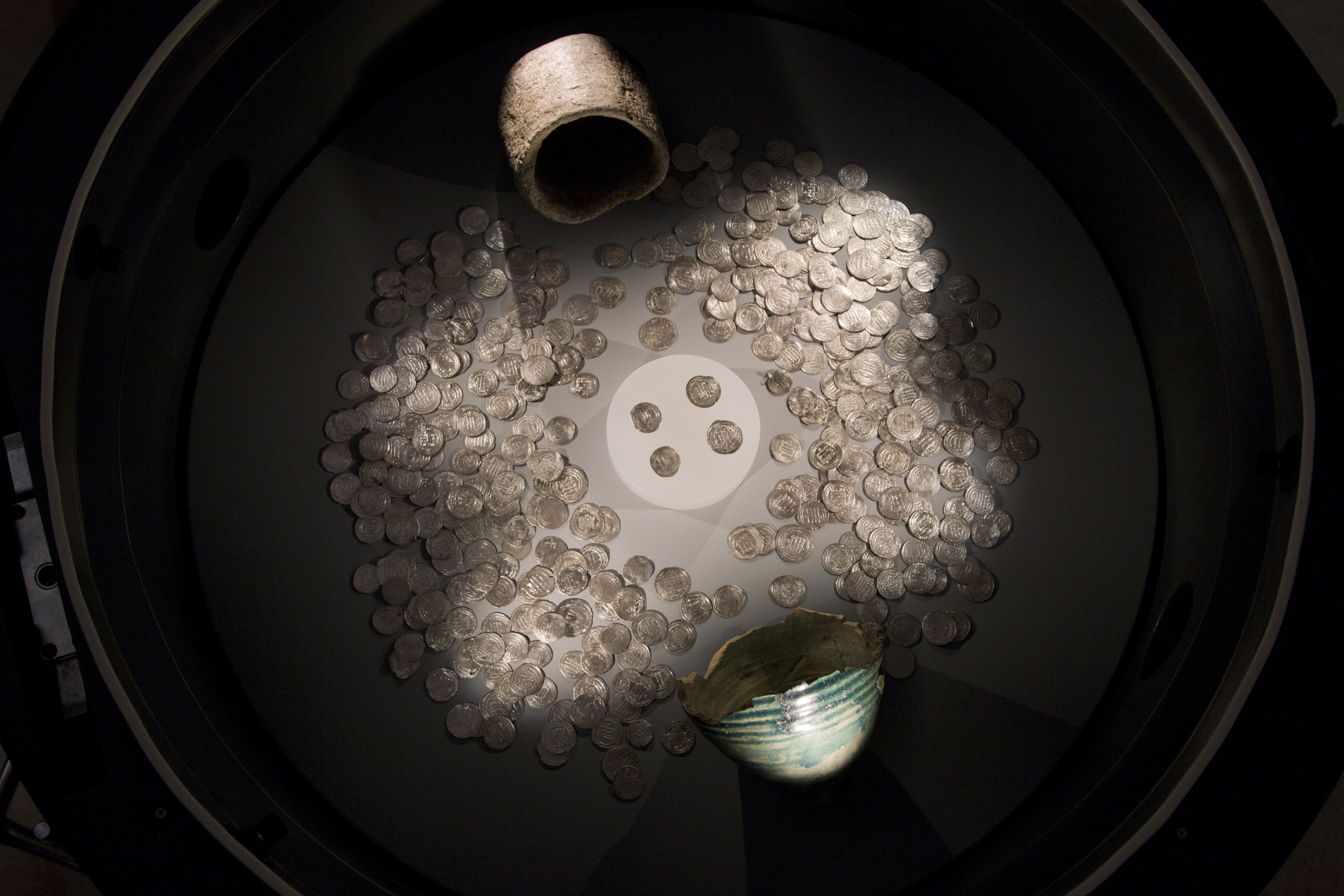
Currency gallery

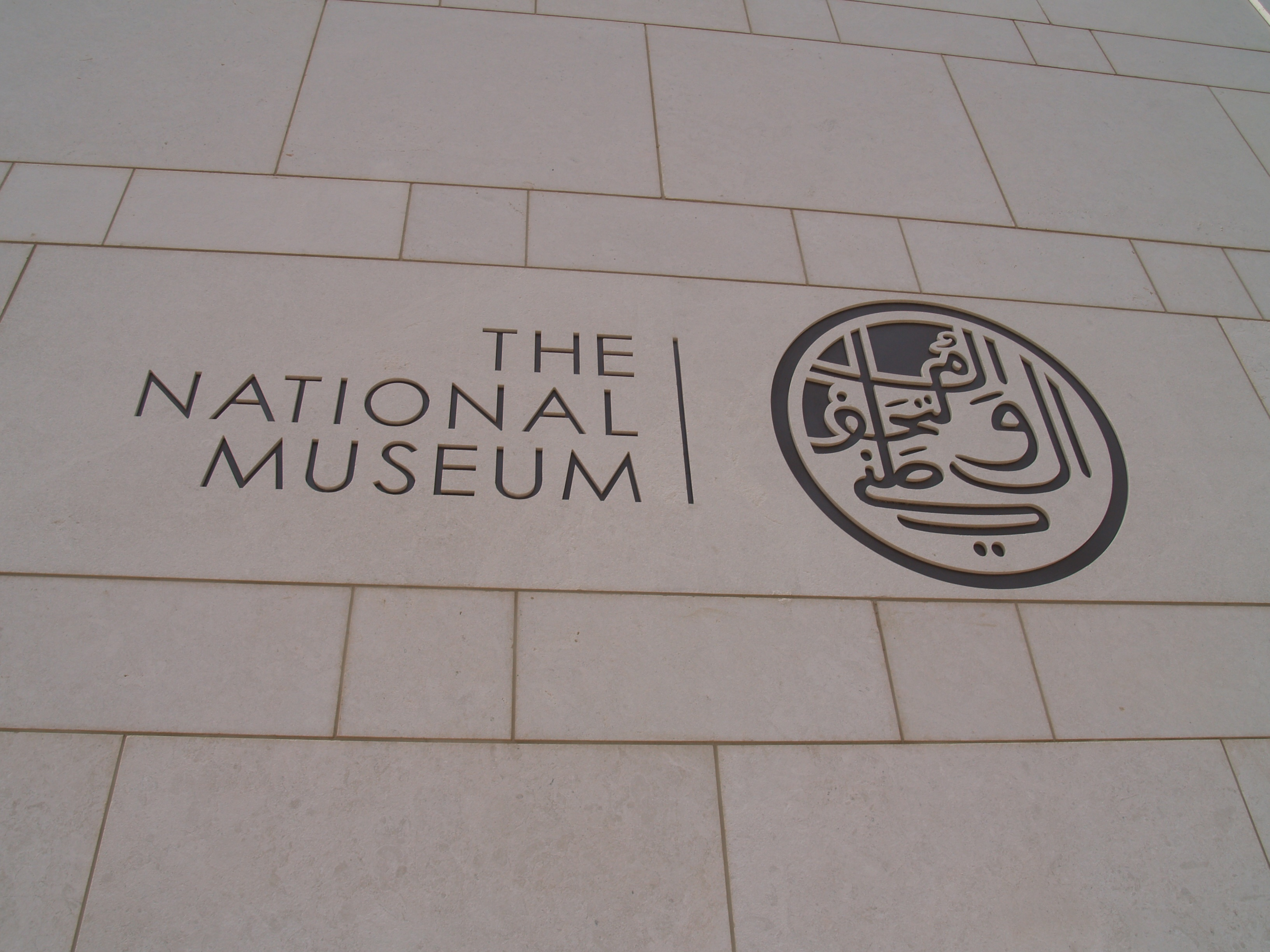
Logo

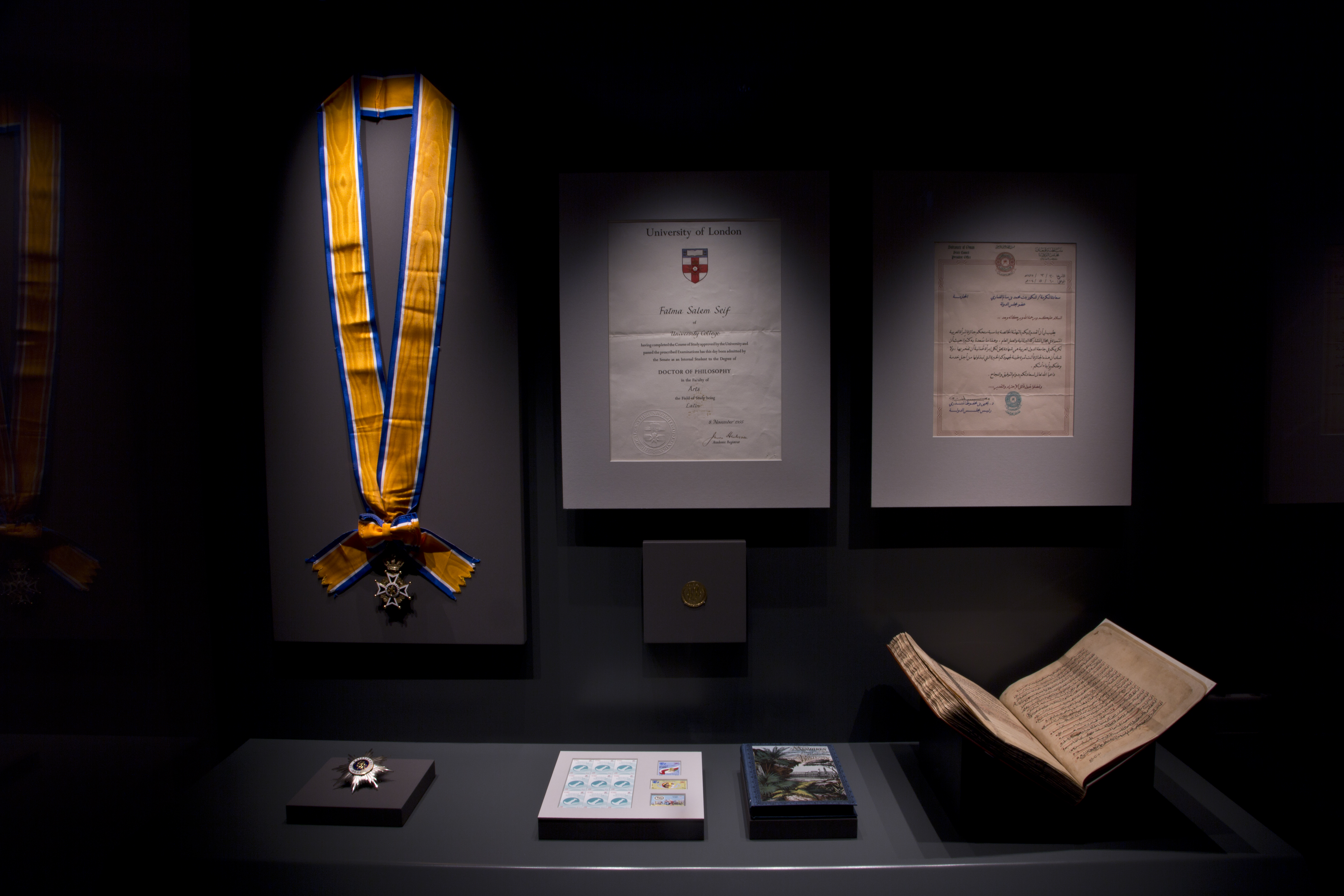
Oman and the World

== Board of trustees ==
- His Excellency Salim bin Mohammed al-Mahrouqi - Minister of Heritage and Tourism, chairman of the Board of Trustees
- H.H. Sayyida Dr. Mona bint Fahad bin Mahmoud al-Said - Assistant Vice Chancellor for International Cooperation at Sultan Qaboos University- member
- His Excellency Sayyid Said bin Sultan al-Busaidi - Undersecretary of the Ministry of Culture, Sports and Youth- member
- Dr Abdullah bin Khamis Ambusaidi - Education Under-Secretary at the Ministry of Education - member
- His Excellency Sheikh Hameed bin Ali al-Maani - Head of the Department of Global Affairs at the Ministry of Foreign Affairs - member
- Dr. Mounir Bouchenaki - Director of the Arab Regional Centre for World Heritage - member
- Mikhail Borisovich Piotrovskiy - Director General of the Hermitage Museum, Russia - member

== See also ==
- List of museums in Oman
