= Oman Natural History Museum =

Natural history museum in Muscat, Oman

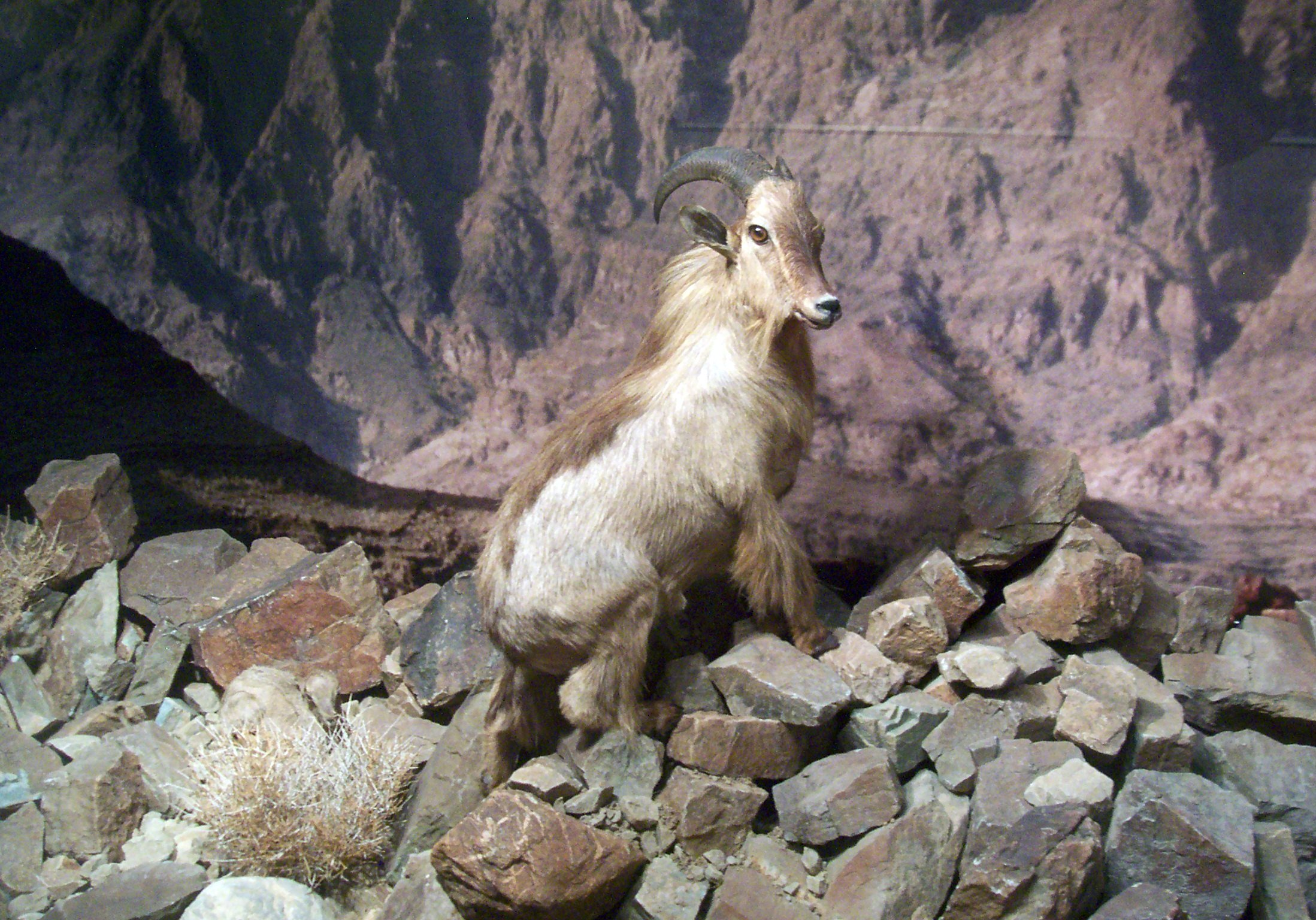
- Location: Muscat, Muscat Governorate, Oman

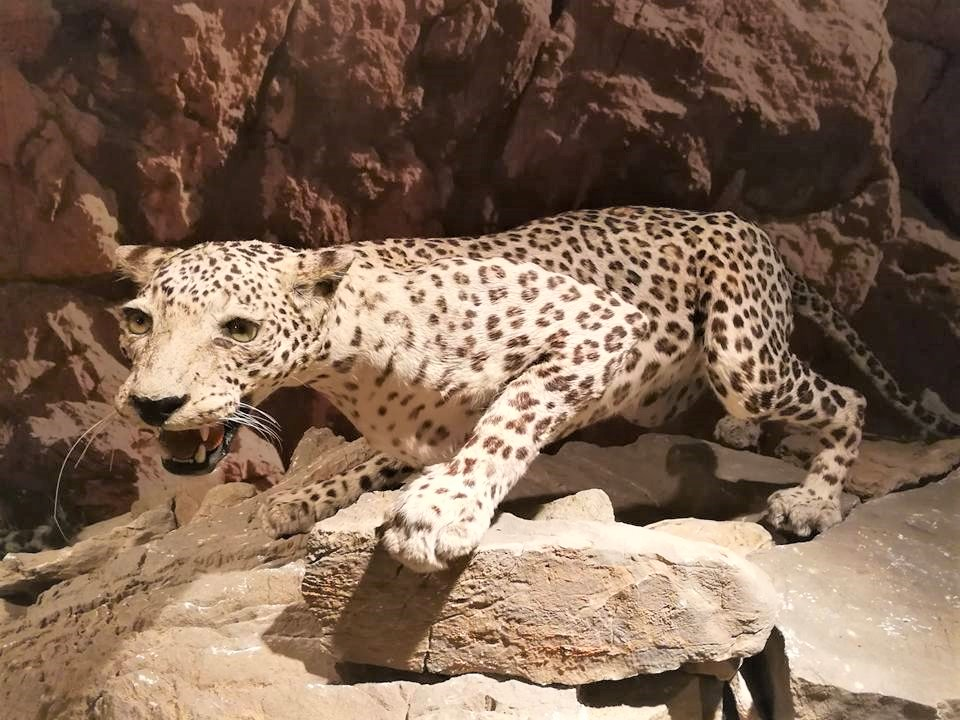
Taxidermied Arabian Leopard at the Oman Natural History Museum in Muscat

The Natural History Museum of Oman (Arabic: متحف التاريخ الطبيعي, romanized: Matḥaf al-Tārīkh al-Ṭabīʻī) is a natural history museum, located at the Ministry of Heritage and Culture complex, Al Khuwair, opposite the Zawawi Mosque in Muscat, Oman.

The museum opened on 20 December 1985, and has detailed coverage of Oman's flora and fauna, with displays on indigenous mammals, insects, and birds and botanical gardens. One of the highlights of the museum is the whale hall: it houses the huge skeleton of a sperm whale, which was washed up on the Omani coastline in the 1986. The museum contains marine and animal fossils and ancient mammals such as monkeys and elephants primitive, teeth Deinotherium and Gomphotherium, and stuffed animals: Arabian leopard, caracal, Arabian Oryx, Arabian wolf, Arab Red fox, Arabian Ibex, flamingo, birds, crow, owl, reptiles, snakes, izards, snails, and shells.

== New premises ==
In January 2014, the Ministry of Heritage and Culture announced plans to build new premises for the museum, the project will consist of three floors with a gross area rated to 5,000 square meters. The first floor is specialised for exhibiting marine environments such as sandy coasts, mangroves, rocky coasts and coral reef environments as well as the geological history of the Sultanate's seas while the second floor displays wild environments such as mammals, insects, birds, valleys, caves and water springs in addition to the geological history of Oman.

The third floor is specialised for showcasing information about the Solar System, planets, space and meteors. The museum includes lectures halls and temporary exhibitions. Additionally, it has well equipped educational halls that will be used for workshops and educational programmes. The museum includes five fundamental scientific sections specialised for research, records, studies, and archives works.

== See also ==
- List of museums in Oman
