= List of companies of Oman =

Location of Oman

Oman is an Arab country on the southeastern coast of the Arabian Peninsula.

By regional standards, Oman has a relatively diversified economy, but remains dependent on oil exports. Tourism is the fastest-growing industry in Oman. Other sources of income, agriculture and industry, are small in comparison and account for less than 1% of the country's exports, but diversification is seen as a priority by the government.

== Notable firms ==
This list includes notable companies with primary headquarters located in the country. The industry and sector follow the Industry Classification Benchmark taxonomy. Organizations which have ceased operations are included and noted as defunct.

Notable companies Status: P=Private, S=State; A=Active, D=Defunct
Name	Industry	Sector	Headquarters	Founded	Notes	Status	
BankMuscat	Financials	Banks	Muscat	1982	Commercial and private bank	P	A
Central Bank of Oman	Financials	Banks	Ruwi	1974	Central bank	S	A
Muscat Securities Market	Financials	Investment services	Muscat	1988	Stock exchange	S	A
National Bank of Oman	Financials	Banks	Ruwi	1973	Commercial bank	P	A
Ooredoo Oman	Telecommunications	Fixed line telecommunications	Muscat	2004	Part of Ooredoo (Qatar)	P	A
Oman Air	Consumer services	Airlines	Muscat	1993	Airline	P	A
Oman Arab Bank	Financials	Banks	Muscat	1984	Commercial bank	P	A
Oman LNG	Oil & gas	Exploration & production	Muscat	1984	LNG plant	P	A
Oman Oil Company	Oil & gas	Exploration & production	Muscat	1996	State-owned oil and gas concern	S	A
Oman Oil Marketing Company	Industrials	Business support services	Muscat	2003	Marketing and distribution	P	A
Oman Refinery Company	Oil & gas	Exploration & production	Muscat	1982	Oil and gas	P	A
Omantel	Telecommunications	Fixed line telecommunications	Muscat	1996	Telecom	P	A
Petroleum Development Oman	Oil & gas	Exploration & production	Muscat	1925	State oil and gas	S	A
Raysut Cement	Industrials	Building Materials & Fixtures	Salalah	1981	Largest cement company	P	A
The Shaksy Group	Conglomerates	-	Muscat	1976	Oil and gas, real estate, construction	P	A

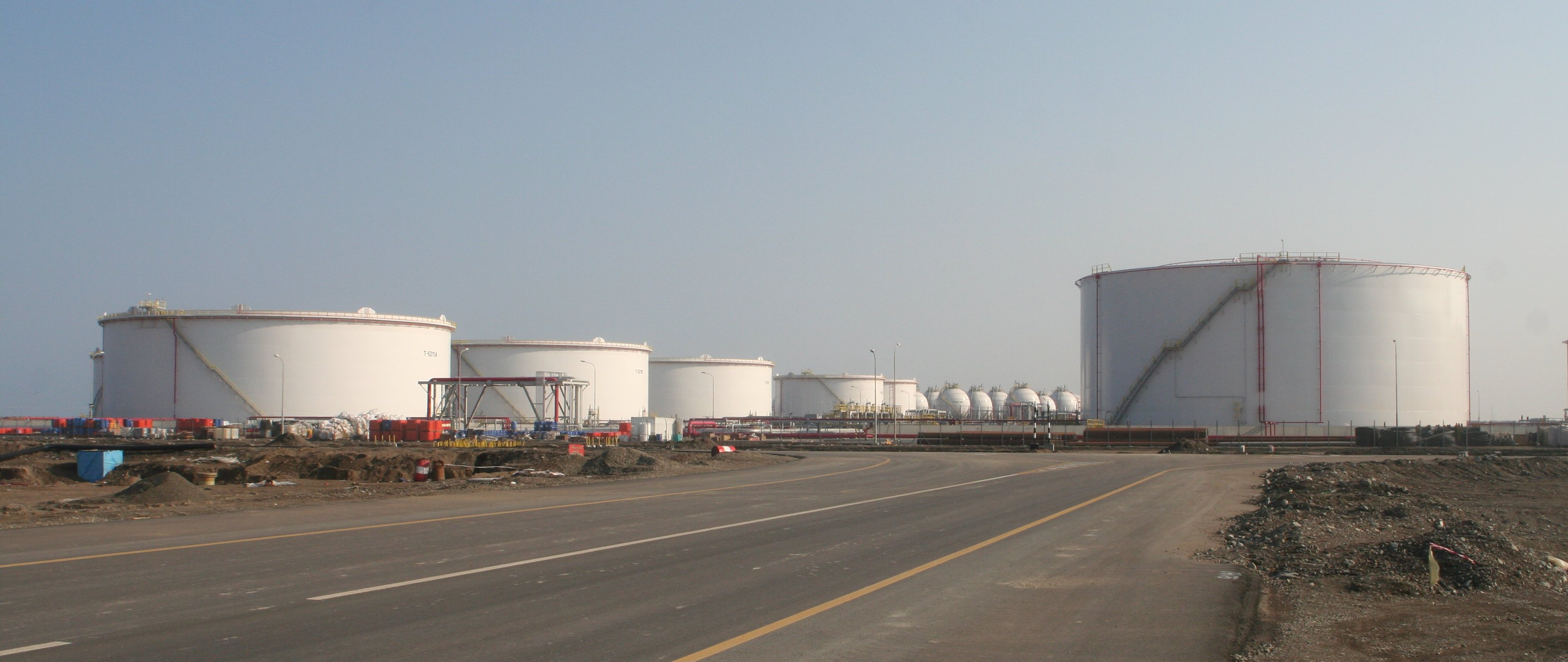
Petrochemical tanks in Sohar.

== See also ==
- List of banks in Oman
