= Salaam bin Said Al Shaksy =

Salaam Said Al Shaksy
- سلام بن سعيد الشقصي
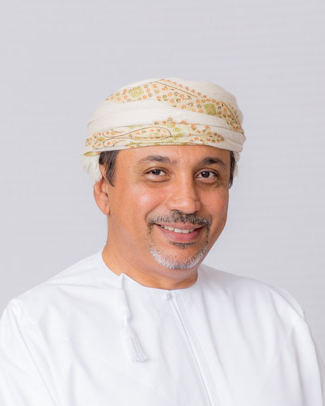
- Al Shaksy official picture in 2015
- Born: 1961 (age 64–65); Oman
- Occupation: Businessman
- Title: Chairman of Oman Housing Bank
- Board member of: Oman Housing Bank SAOC; Chairman of the Shaksy Group; Previously was on the following Boards: Oman Oil Refineries and Petroleum Industries (ORPIC); Board and Board Executive Committee of Al Raff’d Fund (Oman’s Government-funded SME fund); Chairman of Oman’s Growth Fund; Oman Banker's Association; Oman Business Forum; Advisory Committee Member for the National Leadership and Competitiveness Program
- Children: 5
- Father: Said bin Salim Al Shaksy

Salaam Said Al Shaksy (born 1961) is an Omani businessman who is the chairman of Oman Housing Bank, and on the board of directors of a number of companies. He has previously been a member of Oman's State Council.

Al Shaksy was also a member of the board of directors of Oman Oil Company and ORPIC Group. His other appointments included: member of the board of Al Raffd Fund (Oman's Government-funded SME fund); a member of Oman's 2040 Vision Economic Committee; board member of Oman Banks Association; chairman of Oman Growth Fund; a member of Oman Business Forum; and chairman of The Shaksy Group, a company founded by his father.

== Early life and education ==
Al Shaksy was born in Oman in 1961. He was a graduate of Boston University, United States, where he received a bachelor's degree in economics (cum laude), a master's in management information systems (honors) and an MBA in management of financial services (high honors). He has also completed the Senior Executive Program from the London Business School, UK.

== Career ==
Al Shaksy embarked on his banking career with Citibank Global Consumer Business, Dubai, UAE in 1992. Between 1994-2000, Al Shaksy headed a group comprising three divisions - retail banking, investment banking and correspondent banking at the National Bank of Oman.

Al Shaksy held a number of senior executive positions including CEO of Dubai Banking Group, CEO of Dubai Islamic Investment Group and deputy chief executive officer of Bank Dhofar (where he led its merger with Majan International Bank in 2002). He became CEO of National Bank of Oman between 2010 and 2014, leading its turnaround during this period.

He was chief integration officer at Oman Arab Bank after its merger with Alizz Islamic Bank, where he was chief executive officer from 2014 to 2020.

From 2015 to 2019, Al Shaksy was a member of Oman's State Council and deputy head of its economic committee. His other previous roles include being a member of Diwan of Royal Court sponsored Sharakah Program; an advisory committee member for the National Leadership and Competitiveness Program; chairman of Oman National Investment Corporation Holding; deputy chairman of the board of Shell Oman Marketing and chairman of its board audit committee; deputy chairman of Muscat Securities Market; board member of Bank Muscat; and board member of College of Banking and Financial Studies.

== Recognition ==
Al Shaksy is the first Omani CEO of a full-fledged Islamic bank in Oman and has received a number of awards in banking, including "Banker of the Year 2008" - Banker Middle East, and was awarded as one of the ‘Top 10 CEOs for Shari’a Compliant Banks’ for 2019 at the Top CEO Conference and Awards 2019 held in Bahrain. He has also been keynote speaker at several global financial conferences.

== Personal life ==
Al Shaksy is married and has five children. He also loves playing chess and astrophotography.
