= Salem Ben Nasser Al-Ismaily =

- سالم بن ناصر الاسماعيلي
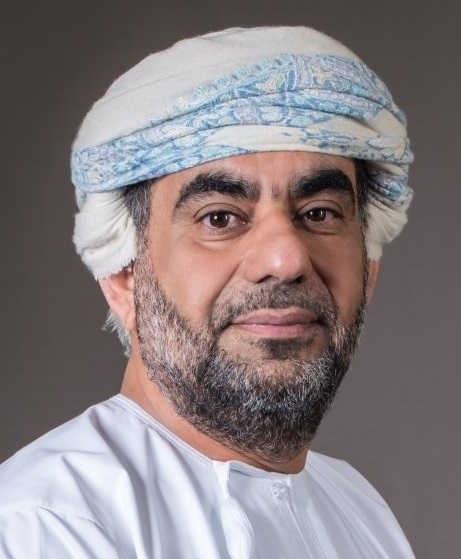

Advisor of the Ministry of Foreign Affairs of Oman

Personal details
- Awards: Order of the Rising Sun 2nd Class, Gold and Silver Star

Dr. Salem Ben Nasser Al-Ismaily is an Omani advisor at the Omani Ministry of Foreign Affairs. Al-Ismaily was previously the chairman and chief executive officer of the Sultanate of Oman Public Authority for Investment Promotion and Export Development, or Ithraa. Al Ismaily has been conferred by the Sultan of Oman, Haitham bin Tariq, the second class order of Oman and by Qaboos bin Said bin Taimur, the late Sultan of Oman, the third and the second class orders of Oman.

== Education ==
Al-Ismaily has degrees in telecommunications, liberal arts, industrial engineering, business administration, and management; with doctorates in philosophy and in economy from British and American universities.

== Career ==
Al-Ismaily worked as the managing director at the Public Establishment for Industrial Estates (PEIE) from 1984 to 1996. The first industrial estate in the Sultanate of Oman was established at Al-Rusayl in the year 1983. As new industrial estates were set up, the Public Establishment for Industrial Estates (PEIE) was formed a decade later to give substantial impetus to industrial development in the country.

In 1996 he was appointed as the deputy chairman and executive president of the Omani Centre for Investment Promotion and Export Development. In 2010, he was appointed as the chair of Ithraa with a ministerial rank. Established in 1996, Ithraa is Oman's award-winning inward investment and export development agency. It is committed to promoting business environment and promoting easy movement of goods people and serves internationally. Al Ismaily is also a member of Fulbright Association for peace.

=== Board member ===
Al-Ismaily also serves as a board member of many private companies in the field of financial services and energy on his personal capacity. He served as the chairman of Oman ORIX Leasing Company SAOG, director of BankMuscat SAOG, Fraser Institute, Gulf Aluminium Rolling Mill Co. B. S. C. (c) Director of Ahli Bank S.A.O.G. from 2008 to June 2010, director of Renaissance Services SAOG and Oman Oil Marketing Company SAOG among others.

=== International Research Foundation ===
Al-Ismaily is the founder and chairman of the International Research Foundation, a non-government, non-profit, economic think tank that has pioneered the research of economic freedom in the Arab World.

The group aims to provide an objective metric of economic policy throughout the Arab World. It measures the extent to which citizens of the nations of the Arab League are able to make their own economic decisions without limitations imposed by the government or by crony elites. The report provides sound empirical measurement of economic policy that can distinguish between phony reform that leaves economic and political power in the hands of crony elites, and real reform that creates new prosperity, entrepreneurship, and jobs, by opening business and work opportunities for everyone no matter whom they know. Arab and Islamic societies have a rich trading tradition that celebrates markets open even to the humblest members of society. Economic freedom is consistent with that proud history and provides a path to a more prosperous and freer tomorrow. Economic freedom is simply the ability of individuals and families to take charge of their fate and make their own economic decisions—to sell or buy in the marketplace without discrimination, to open or close a business, to work for whom they wish or hire whom they wish, to receive investment or invest in others.

Al Ismaily was named the "Man of the Year" in 2015 at the Arab Liberty Festival in Marrakesh, Morocco.

He was honoured for his exceptional professional and academic contribution to the understanding of free enterprise in the Arab world, and to public policies that encourage prosperity, innovation and human fulfillment.

Al Ismaily has published several papers on the subject of cross culture, management and economy including five books on corporate culture, history and religion.

=== The release of American hikers imprisoned in Iran ===
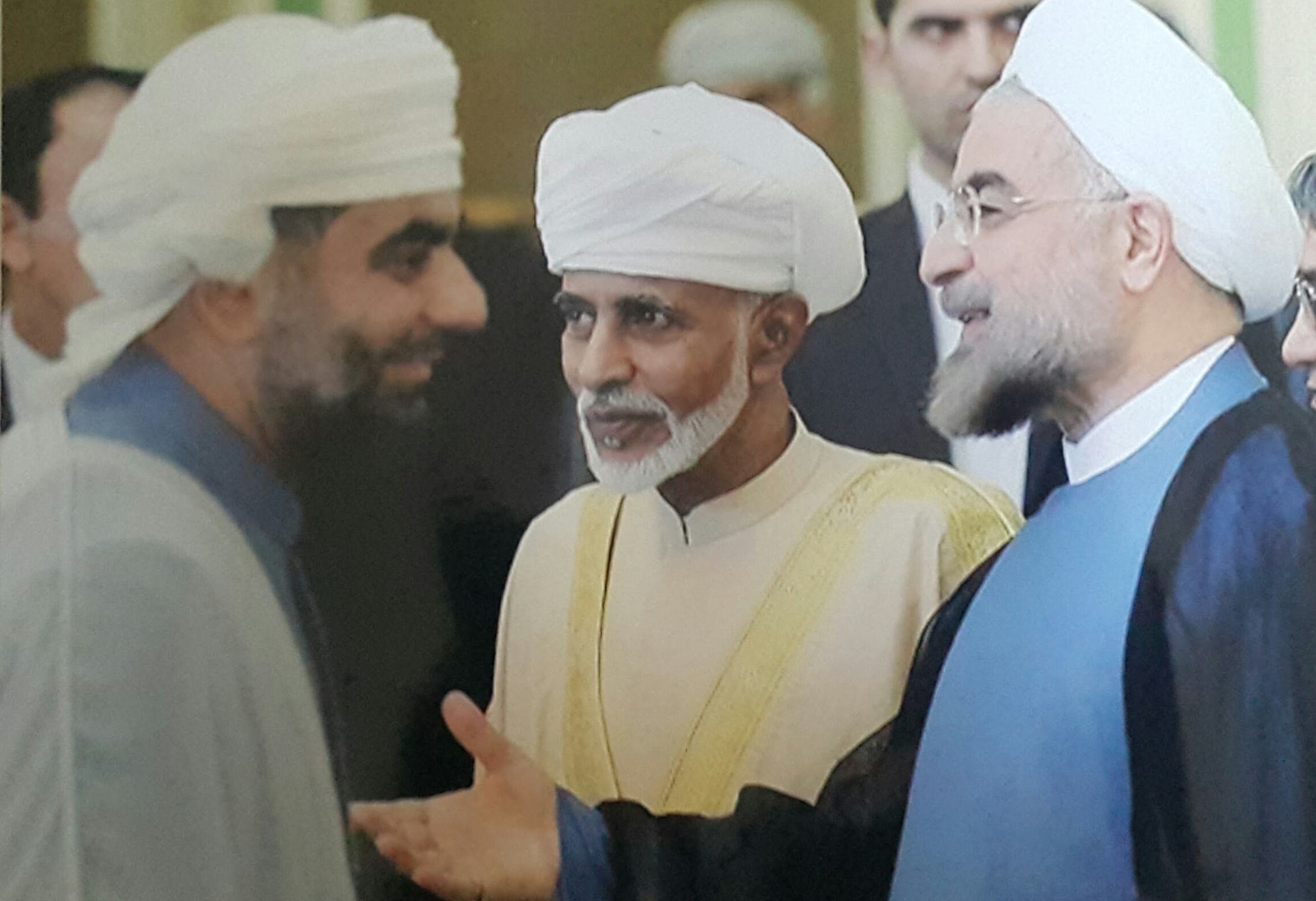
Dr. Salem Al-Ismaily with President Hassan Rouhani and Sultan Qaboos bin Said

Americans Shane Bauer and Josh Fattal were released in September 2011, after being held in Tehran's Evin Prison for 26 months. Oman's envoy in Iran said in a statement that "the Islamic Republic of Iran has handled Bauer and Fattal to the custody of Dr. Salem Al Ismaily, the envoy of Sultan Qaboos bin Said, the Sultan of Oman, a country that enjoys excellent relationships with both Iran and the USA. Dr. Al Ismaily with the hikers left on their way to Muscat where they will spend a couple of days before heading home."

The pair, released from an Iranian prison, arrived in Muscat, the capital of Oman, before leaving Muscat airport for an undisclosed location, Fattal and Bauer released brief statements. They took no questions from reporters. Josh Fattal expressed his deepest gratitude toward Sultan Qaboos of Oman for obtaining their release.

President Obama called Sultan Qaboos bin Said to convey the United States’ appreciation for the Sultan's role in securing the release of the hikers.

=== Omani back channel ===
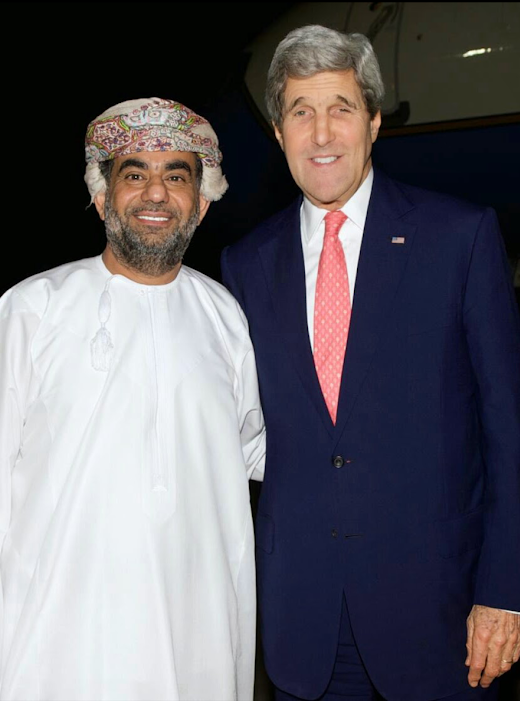
Dr. Salem Al-Ismaily with John Kerry

Al-Isamily was the colorful fixture of the Omani “back channel” to Iran that opened in 2009. The contact of Ismaily began in May 2009 four months after President Obama took office. He surprised the Americans with “an offer by Iran to negotiate” about the nuclear program, Al-Ismaily assured he could bring the Iranians to the table, and he made his promise. John Kerry and Salem Al-Ismaily knew each other during the hikers negotiations, and Kerry had made several visits to Oman in 2011 and early 2012. “In his zeal to jump-start the negotiations, Kerry passed several messages to the Iranians through Ismaily,” according to Mark Landler.

“Within the first five minutes of meeting Salem,” recalls Kerry, “I realized that his objective extended beyond the hikers. We spoke of the importance of getting Josh and Shane home swiftly but he turned quickly to the potential for progress on other fronts as well. At the top of the list was Iran’s current path to a nuclear weapon.”

“Salem made clear to me during that first meeting that Sultan Qaboos felt he could be helpful in advancing a mutually agreeable solution. It was also clear that the Omanis were not acting only out of goodwill; they knew that a nuclear-armed Iran would fundamentally undermine the stability of the region", stated Kerry.

“And they were concerned, as we were, that Tehran was getting closer and closer to a weapon. Shane and Josh were finally released in September 2011, thanks in large part to Oman’s efforts. In my view, and in the view of many in the Obama administration, including President Obama himself, Sultan Qaboos had proven his seriousness and his sway with the Iranians..."

“Having proven their bona fides, I believed it was appropriate to see if they could help bridge the communications divide with the Iranians. We needed greater insight into their thinking. We needed to better assess the possibilities. Salem and I began to talk regularly, both on the phone and, from time to time, in person..."

"There was general agreement that, given the success of the hikers’ release, it was worth at least exploring the potential for progress on the nuclear front. With President Obama's approval, I began planning for a trip to Muscat to meet with Sultan Qaboos in hopes of gaining better insight as to what was really possible."

=== Oman and Tanzania ===
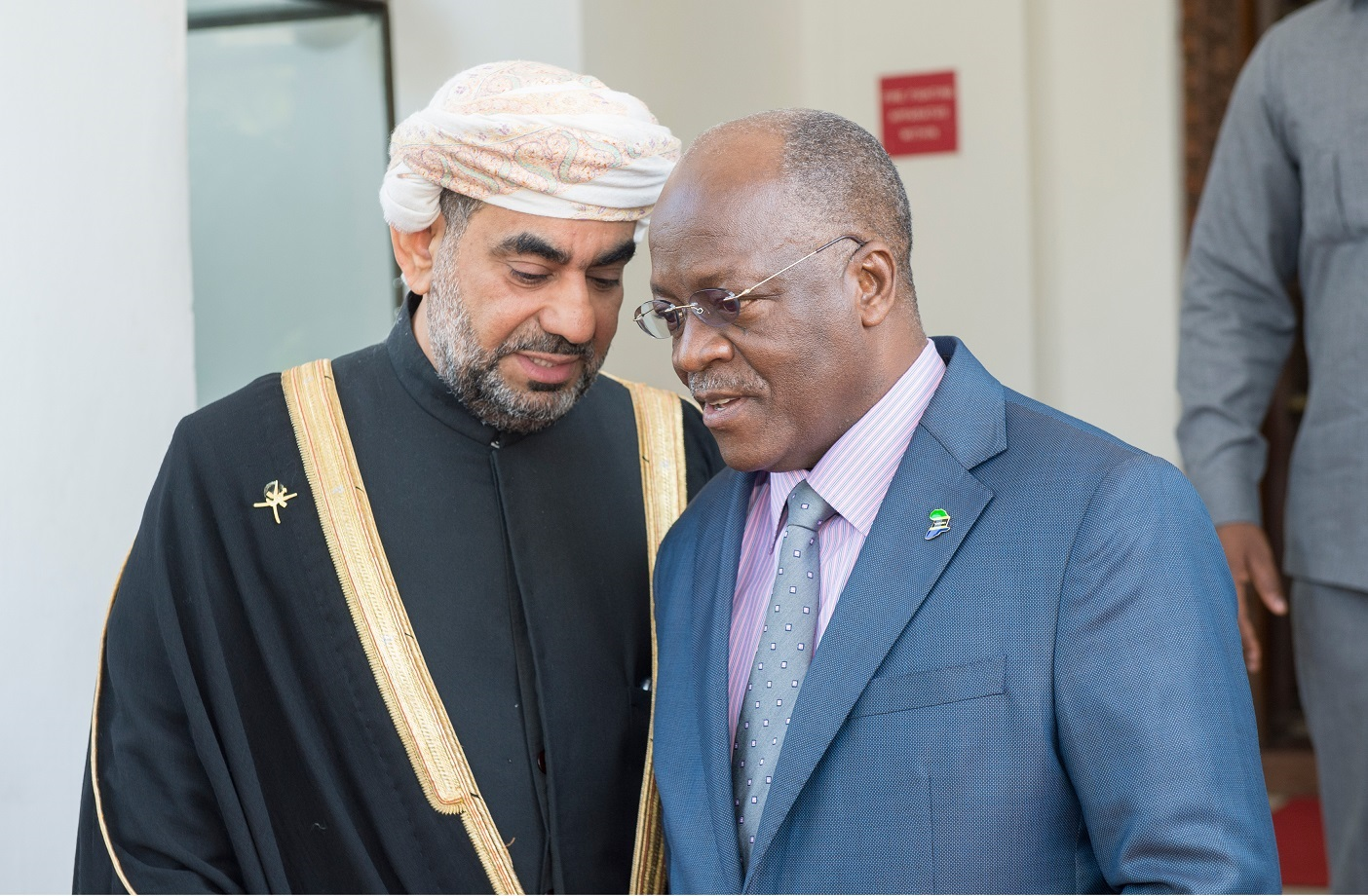
President John Magufuli with Dr. Salem Al Ismaily

Oman pledged to support Tanzania in its drive towards an industrial economy aimed at making the east African nation a middle-income country by 2025. A high-level delegation from Oman made the pledge during talks with President John Magufuli, said the statement.

The delegation arrived in Dar es Salaam port on Tuesday 17 October 2017, aboard a ship christened Fulk Al Salamah. They aimed at strengthening the Tanzania-Oman relationship, especially on the economic front. For his part, President Magufuli, apart from thanking the Omani royal government for its commitment, pledged continued cooperation.

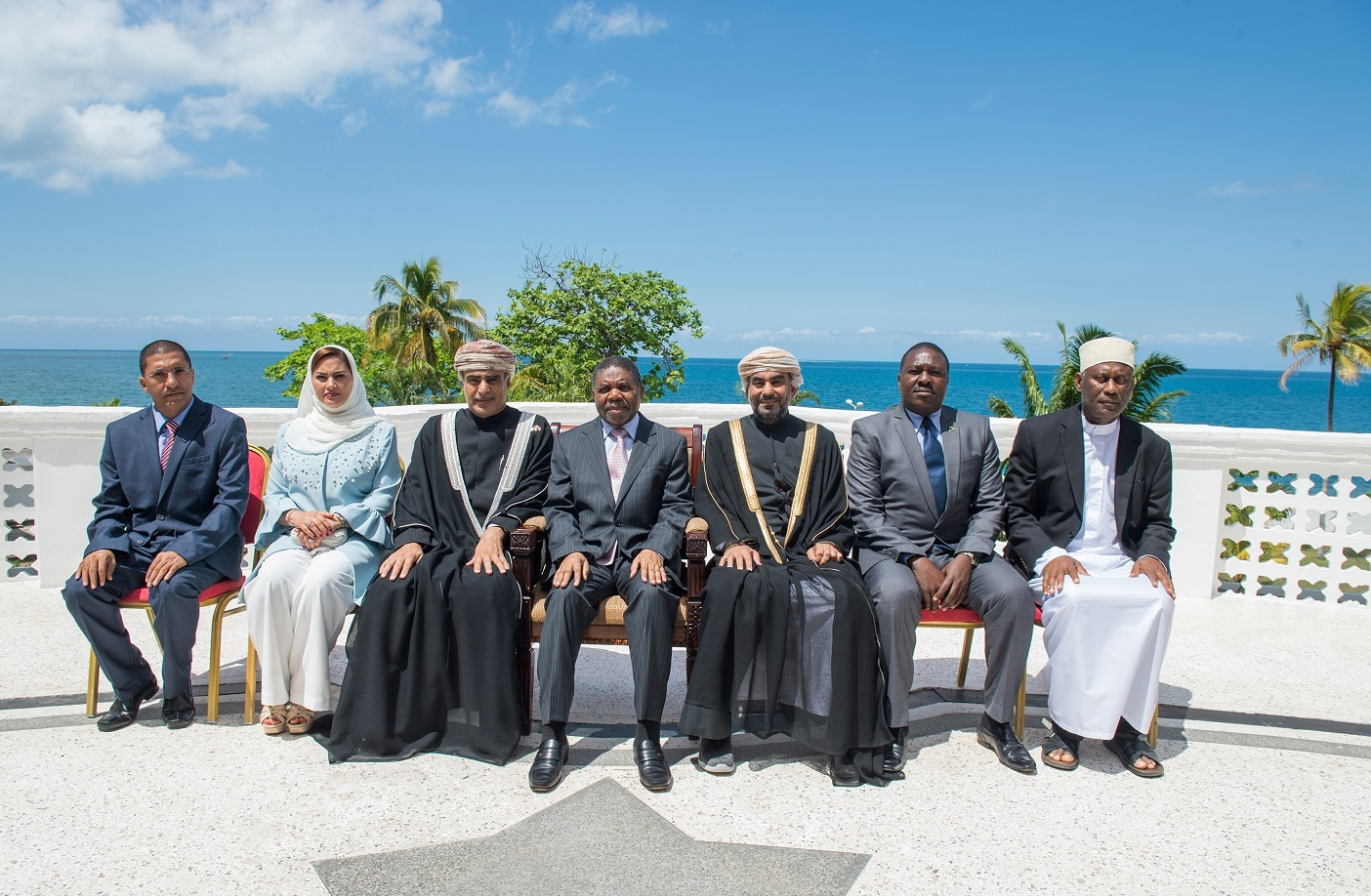
Dr. Ali Shein, the President of Zanzibar with the Omani Delegation

The president said Tanzania was ready to create conducive environment for investments by giving investors necessary support. He asked the government of Oman to strengthen its relationship with Tanzania on tourism, fishing and aviation sectors as well as construction of meat processing industries, and exchange programs for experts in Kiswahili and Arabic languages. Magufuli also thanked the Omani government for the construction of 100 water wells across the country and asked for more investments in the new capital city of Dodoma in central Tanzania.

== Publications ==
Al-Ismaily is instrumental in promoting trade relations between Oman and the United States.

He has written several books, one of which, Inside the Omani Corporate Culture – A Research in Management Styles, co-authored with Professor Peter McKiernan of the University of St Andrews, is the academic foundation of this story. Richard Tzudiker is a freelance writer with a bachelor's degree in English from Colgate University and a master's degree in business administration from the University of Denver.

== Religious affairs ==
In his efforts on promoting cultural dialogue, Al-Ismaily met with Patriarch Mor Ignatius Aphrem II in Muscat to discuss issues of cultural and religious exchanges in which they spoke about the history of religions, especially that of Syriac Orthodox Church and its presence in Oman. The discussions took place in the presence of Mor Clemis Daniel Kourieh, Metropolitan of Beirut, Raban Joseph Bali, Patriarchal Secretary and Media Office Director

== Honours ==
Order of the Rising Sun, 2nd Class, Gold and Silver Star, 2017.
