= COVID-19 pandemic in Selangor =

Aspect of viral disease pandemic

- Disease: COVID-19
- Pathogen: SARS-CoV-2
- Location: Selangor, Malaysia
- First outbreak: Wuhan, Hubei, China
- Index case: Sungai Buloh
- Arrival date: 25 January 2020
- Confirmed cases: <1,300,000
- Active cases: < 30,000
- Recovered: <
- Deaths: 7,823

Government website
- https://newslab.malaysiakini.com/covid-19/en/state/selangor (Non government)

The COVID-19 pandemic in Selangor, Malaysia, started when four of eight Chinese nationals from Wuhan was quarantined in a hotel of Johor's Iskandar Puteri was tested positive on 25 January and 28 January 2020, respectively, and was quarantined in Sungai Buloh Hospital, largest hospital of Selangor. As of 24 October, Selangor confirmed more than 700,000 cases and over 7,000 deaths. Making it the worst effected state in Malaysia

== Statistics ==
Distribution of cumulative confirmed cases in districts of Selangor (as of 2 August 2020)
Districts		Confirmed	Active
1	Gombak	14,052	664
2	Hulu Langat	34,203	1,729
3	Hulu Selangor(N)	3,029	182
4	Klang(N)	37,139	800
5	Kuala Langat(N)	8,690	202
6	Kuala Selangor(N)	4,928	364
7	Petaling	48,733	2220
8	Sabak Bernam(N)	874	167
9	Sepang	11,421	350
10	Imported	198	69
Total		163,747	6,682

(N)=No new cases in past 14 days

=== Details of death cases in Selangor ===
Details of the confirmed death cases in Selangor as of 24 June 2020
Case Number		Date of Death	Nationality	Gender	Age	Hospitalised Location	Patient Data	Source
1	1070	22 March 2020	Malaysia	Male	70	Canselor Tuanku Muhriz UKM Hospital	The patient was a mosque leader from Cheras. He had heart disease and hypertension and travelled to Indonesia on February. He was hospitalised on March 18 and admitted into ICU the next day. Died at 9:05 pm, March 22. He died in Kuala Lumpur, but was counted into Selangor's death toll as UKM Hospital was close to Ampang.	
2	1321	27 March 2020	Malaysia	Male	53	Sungai Buloh Hospital	Had close contact with case 1309. Died at 10:30 am, March 27. The details of this case have not been disclosed.	
3	2321	28 March 2020	Malaysia	Female	91	University Malaya Medical Centre	Died at 8:48 am, March 28. She had diabetes, hypertension and kidney disease.	
4	2322	28 March 2020	Malaysia	Male	76	University Malaya Medical Centre	Died at 11:33 pm, March 28. Had diabetes, hypertension and kidney disease.	
5	2628	31 March 2020	Malaysia	Male	81	University Malaya Medical Centre	Died at 7:09 am, March 31. Had heart disease.	
6	2629	30 March 2020	Malaysia	Male	73	Tengku Ampuan Rahimah Hospital	Died at 4:30 pm, March 30, a day after hospitalisation. Had diabetes and heart disease.	
7	2561	2 April 2020	Malaysia	Female	84	National Heart Institute	Died at 1:07 pm, April 2. Hospitalised in Hospital Sungai Buloh on March 12 before being transferred to National Heart Institute. Had heart disease.	
8	4230	10 April 2020	Malaysia	Female	88	University Malaya Medical Centre	Close contact of case 1684. Hospitalised on March 20 and died at 2:38 am, April 10. Had hypertension, heart disease and dementia.	
9	537	11 April 2020	Malaysia	Male	71	Sungai Buloh Hospital	Died at 11:15 am, April 11, after 27 days of hospitalisation. Had diabetes, hypertension and heart disease.	
10	2052	14 April 2020	Malaysia	Male	65	Sungai Buloh Hospital	Died at 5:17 am, April 14, after two weeks in hospital. Had diabetes, hypertension and kidney disease.	
11	4988	15 April 2020	Malaysia	Male	69	University Malaya Medical Centre	Died at 6:41 am, April 15 after three weeks in hospital. Had diabetes and hypertension.	
12	5183	16 April 2020	Malaysia	Male	85	University Malaya Medical Centre	Had close contact with case 2321, 3rd death of Selangor. Died at 8:56 pm, April 16. Had hypertension and previously had stroke.	
13	5252	17 April 2020	Myanmar	Male	36	Selayang Hospital	Died at 10 am, 17 April, the same day as he went to hospital for treatment. Had Severe Acute Respiratory Infection (SARI) and was already late-stage when he went to hospital. He was the third foreigner (with confirmed identity) to die of COVID-19 in Malaysia and was part of the Kuala Lumpur Wholesale Market cluster.	
14	2050	20 April 2020	Malaysia	Female	72	Sungai Buloh Hospital	Mother of case 2053. Died at 1:47 pm, April 20. Had diabetes and hypertension.	
15	2978	24 April 2020	Malaysia	Male	61	Sungai Buloh Hospital	Had close contact with case 1345, who had travelled to Indonesia. Died at 2:29 am, April 24. Had diabetes, hypertension and kidney disease.	
16	2354	25 April 2020	Malaysia	Male	62	Sungai Buloh Hospital	Died at 3:53 am, April 25. Had heart disease.	
17	3628	28 April 2020	Malaysia	Male	67	Sungai Buloh Hospital	Died at 9:40 am, April 28. Had diabetes, hypertension, heart disease and stroke. He was the 100th death from COVID-19 in Malaysia.	
18	5539	2 May 2020	Malaysia	Male	82	Sungai Buloh Hospital	Died at 6:29 pm, May 2. Had hypertension and heart disease.	
19	830	5 May 2020	Malaysia	Male	47	Sungai Buloh Hospital	Died at 2:10 am, May 5. After 46 days in ICU. He was admitted into a private hospital on March 15, and was transferred into Hospital Sungai Buloh after being tested positive for COVID-19. He was treated in ICU. On May 5, he developed thrombosis and died of complications. He was an accountant who was Chinese.	
20	2380	5 May 2020	Malaysia	Male	51	Sungai Buloh Hospital	Died at 2:53 pm, May 5. Had diabetes, hypertension and kidney disease.	
21	6657	10 May 2020	Malaysia	Male	63	Kuala Lumpur Hospital	Died at 5:15 am, May 10. Had diabetes and liver cancer.	
22	3616	21 May 2020	Malaysia	Male	65	Sungai Buloh Hospital	Died at 2:58 pm, May 21. Had diabetes, hypertension and kidney disease.	
23	2296	5 June 2020	Malaysia	Female	79	Sungai Buloh Hospital	Died at 2:05 pm, June 5. Had contact with case 1508.	
24	824	10 June 2020	Malaysia	Male	61	Sungai Buloh Hospital	Attended Tabligh Jamaat event in Sri Petaling, Kuala Lumpur on late-February to early-March. Died at 7 am, June 10, after almost three months of treatment. Had diabetes and kidney disease. He was the 34th fatality of Tabligh Jamaat cluster.	

Details of the confirmed death cases in Selangor from other states/territories as of 24 June 2020
Case Number		Date of Death	Nationality	Gender	Age	Region of Origin	Hospitalised Location	Patient Data	Source
1	1952	29 March 2020	Malaysia	Female	57	Putrajaya	Sungai Buloh Hospital	Died at 4 pm, March 29. She was a worker of Human Resources Department of Ministry of Health. She had a travel history to Indonesia. On March 17, she was hospitalised in Putrajaya Hospital before being transferred to Kuala Lumpur Hospital and Sungai Buloh Hospital.	

=== Graphs ===
Total cumulative cases in Selangor

== Timeline ==
=== January 2020 ===
On 24 January, eight Chinese nationals from Wuhan of Hubei Province entered Johor via Tuas checkpoint of neighbouring Singapore. They were quarantined in the forest city of Iskandar Puteri and was tested negative earlier, but on 25 January, 3 of them was tested positive, marking the beginning of COVID-19 outbreak in Malaysia. The 3 patients were 65-year-old woman and her 11 and 2-year old grandsons. They were quarantined in Sungai Buloh Hospital of Sungai Buloh, Petaling District, making Selangor the first hit state of Malaysia.

3 days later, a 36-year-old woman, who is daughter-in-law of first case of Singapore. and mother of Case 2 and 3, was also tested positive. She was also warded in Sungai Buloh Hospital. She had negative results earlier but she went to Sungai Buloh Hospital to take care of her two infected child, where she got tested positive too.

=== February 2020 ===
On 29 January 2020, a 41-year-old Malaysian male, who attended an international conference in Grand Hyatt Singapore on 17–23 January and celebrated Chinese New Year with his family, went to a private medical institution in Selangor after having fever and cough. He was admitted to Sungai Buloh Hospital on 2 February, and was tested positive for COVID-19 by the next day. His 40-year-old sister who was in Kedah, who visited him during Chinese New Year, was also diagnosed 2 days later, making her the first locally transmitted case of COVID-19 in Malaysia.

On 8 February, Selangor records 1 more new case, which is linked to Case 9. The patient was a 65-year old Malaysian woman, who ate with Case 9 at the same table during the Chinese New Year. She began to feel uncomfortable on 5 February, where she had dizziness and night sweats but without fever. She was diagnosed on 8 February, while she herself had several chronic illnesses, such as hypertension, diabetes, paraplegia etc. She is also a heart patient with pacemaker. She was treated in Hospital Sungai Buloh.

On 9 February, Selangor recorded another new case: a 31-year-old man from Hulu Langat District who works in Macau and been to Mainland China on 1 February. He developed cough on 7 February and was admitted into Sungai Buloh Hospital. He was later diagnosed on 9 February.

On 14 February, the first 4 patients of Selangor which was treated in Sungai Buloh Hospital, was fully recovered and discharged.

The next day, 1 more positive case was recorded: an 83-year old American woman. She was a passenger of MS Westerdam, which was docked in Sihanoukville port of Cambodia. After passing the medical examination in Cambodia on 13 February, she was allowed to return to US by Cambodian authorities. But since Cambodia don't have direct flight to Europe or the US, she have to fly to Malaysia and transfer plane to US. She was diagnosed with abnormal temperature screening in KLIA and was admitted to Sungai Buloh Hospital, where she was tested positive. Her 85-year-old husband was tested negative for COVID-19, but he chose to accompany her in Sungai Buloh Hospital.

On 17 February, Case 9, or 5th case of Selangor, has recovered and discharged, making him he first Malaysian citizen to recover from COVID-19. On 19 February, two more patients were discharged: Case 17 and 18.

On 21 February, Case 22 (83-year-old woman from the US) was clear from SARS-CoV-2 virus, but she was still hospitalised for further treatment of other illnesses.

On 27 February, Case 22 was finally discharged after fully recovered from all COVID-19 symptoms. Selangor was free of COVID-19 active case.

At the next day, Selangor was no-longer COVID free as 1 more case was recorded. The new patient was a 54-year-old man from Italy who is married to a Malaysian woman. He went back to Italy on 15–21 February for business reasons. He was diagnosed on 28 February and was treated in Sungai Buloh Hospital.

Details of the earlier confirmed cases in Selangor (As of 29 February)
Case Number		Date of diagnosis	Infection Group	Nationality	Infection Source	Gender	Age	Hospitalised Location	Note	Status
1	1	25 January 2020	G1	China	Imported (Singapore)	Female	65	Sungai Buloh Hospital		Discharged on 14 February
2	2	25 January 2020	G1 (Grandson of Case 1)	China	Imported (Singapore)	Male	11	Sungai Buloh Hospital		Discharged on 14 February
3	3	25 January 2020	G1 (Grandson of Case 1)	China	Imported (Singapore)	Male	2	Sungai Buloh Hospital		Discharged on 14 February
4	5	28 January 2020	G1 (Mother of Case 2 & 3)	China	Imported (Singapore)	Female	36	Sungai Buloh Hospital		Discharged on 14 February
5	9	3 February 2020	G2	Malaysia	Imported (Singapore)	Male	41	Sungai Buloh Hospital	First Malaysian citizen to be diagnosed.	Discharged on 17 February
6	17	8 February 2020	G2 (Mother-in-law of Case 9)	Malaysia	Local	Female	65	Sungai Buloh Hospital	2nd local case of Malaysia and 3rd case of Malaysia related to Grand Hyatt Singapore international conference.	Discharged on 19 February
7	18	9 February 2020		Malaysia	Imported (Macau/China)	Male	31	Sungai Buloh Hospital	Works in Macau and has travel history to Mainland China.	Discharged on 19 February
8	22	15 February 2020		United States	Imported (Cambodia)	Female	83	Sungai Buloh Hospital		Discharged on 27 February
9	25	28 February 2020	G3	Italy	Imported (Italy)	Male	54	Sungai Buloh Hospital	Married to a Malaysian woman and resides in Malaysia. Went back to Italy on mid-February and returned on 21 February.	—N/a

On 27 February 2020, a Tablighi Jamaat event was held in a mosque of Sri Petaling, Kuala Lumpur. It was attended by 15,000 people, including 14,500 Malaysian citizens and 1,500 foreigners. This event was attended by multiple Malaysians returning from South Korea.

=== March 2020 ===
On 1 March 2020, Hisham Hamdan, who is the executive director of Khazanah Nasional and chairman of UDA Holdings Berhad, was tested positive for COVID-19. He travelled to Shanghai, China on mid-January. He had meetings with 18 others on 21 February, 15 on 24 February, and 21 others on 27 February. He developed symptoms on 27 February and sought treatment in Subang Jaya Medical Centre. He was tested positive on 1 March. He had close contact with 168 individuals, which is already tested.

On 3 March 2020, Malaysia reports multiple of cases in Selangor, mainly linked to Case 26. One more key case in Case 26 was identified at the same day: Case 33. Case 33 was a senior lawyer and member of UDA Holdings Berhad, Rosli Dahlan. He had meeting with 14 other person on 24 February with Mr. Hisham Hamdan.

On 9 March 2020, total cases of Malaysia breach 100, most of the cases in early-March were linked to Case 26 & 33. However, both Mr. Hamdan (Case 26) and Mr. Dahlan (Case 33) has recovered and discharged, but date is undisclosed.

On mid-March, main cluster of Malaysia has slowly turned from Case 26 & 33 to Tabligh Jamaat. Brunei, Indonesia, Cambodia, Philippines and other Southeast Asian nations had reported multiple confirmed cases from Tabligh Jamaat event. On 13 March, Malaysia released state-by-state data. Selangor had confirmed 87 total cumulative cases as of 13 March. On 15 March, Malaysia reports sudden spike of new cases, with 190 new cases, mostly from Tabligh event in Masjid Sri Petaling.

On 16 March, Prime Minister Muhyiddin Yassin held a nationwide live telecast at night, to announce the implementation of Movement Control Order (MCO). It will be gone effective on 18 March 2020 and expected to end on 31 March 2020. Total cumulative cases of Selangor had also breached 100, as the total reached 144.

On 17 March, Malaysia reported its first two fatalities: a 60-year-old pastor from Good News Fellowship Conference, Kuching, Sarawak, who was identified as David Cheng, and a 34-year-old man from Johor Bahru, Johor, who attended Tabligh Jamaat event in Kuala Lumpur. Both of them were Malaysian male national. Selangor had also recorded 17 new cases.

On 18 March, Movement Control Order had officially gone effective. All shops will be closed except for essential services; major gatherings is banned, schools will be closed, etc. At the same day, a newly married couple was tested positive for COVID-19. They held a wedding ceremony on 6–7 March in Bandar Baru Bangi of Hulu Langat District. 44 health workers from Teluk Intan Hospital attended this wedding, as the couple was a doctor and a nurse. The Ministry believes that this cluster was caused by Tabligh cluster. More and more cases related to Tabligh were also reported.

On 23 March 2020, Selangor recorded its first fatality. The victim was a 70-year-old mosque leader from Cheras. He had heart disease and hypertension, and he died in Canselor Tuanku Muhriz UKM Hospital near Ampang, Hulu Langat District. He travelled to Indonesia on February. This is the 11th fatality of Malaysia.

As of 24 March, 3 district of Selangor has been classified as red zone (district with 40+ cases): Gombak, Hulu Langat and Petaling. Petaling district, where Sungai Buloh, Petaling Jaya and Shah Alam were located, was the 2nd leading red zone with 158 registered cases as of 24 March, behind Lembah Pantai of Kuala Lumpur, which has 167 registered cases.

On 26 March, Selangor records 75 new positive cases, the highest record. Malaysia also records 235 new cases nationwide, which is the highest until 4 June. On the same day, Klang became the fourth red zone of Selangor.

On 27 March, a new fatality was recorded; a 53-year-old man. He died in Sungai Buloh Hospital. At the same day, a 62-year-old man was found dead in the toilet of Serdang Hospital, Kajang. He was believed to have committed suicide. He was found dead by a nurse at 7:40 pm. He is a patient under investigation (PUI) and had depression. On 28 March, Director-General of Health of Malaysia, Noor Hisham Abdullah, said that the 62-year-old man got tested negative during the press conference.

On March 28, two more fatalities were recorded; Case 2321 and Case 2322. Case 2321 was a 91-year-old Malaysian female national while Case 2322 was a 76-year-old Malaysian male national. Both of them were treated at University Malaya Medical Centre and has diabetes, hypertension and kidney disease.

On March 30, no fatalities of Selangor residents were recorded, but a worker of Human Resources Department of MOH from Putrajaya, the administrative center of Malaysia, had died in Sungai Buloh Hospital. The victim from Putrajaya was a Malaysian 57-year-old female national. She had travel history to Indonesia, and was admitted to Putrajaya Hospital on 17 March after showing symptoms for five days. She was later transferred to Kuala Lumpur Hospital, and later Sungai Buloh Hospital. She was counted into Putrajaya's statistics.

Hulu Langat District had also become the leading red zone of Selangor on 30 March, with 258 total cases, compared to 224 cases in Petaling. Hulu Langat had also become the leading red zone of entire Malaysia.

On 31 March, two more fatalities were recorded: Case 2628 and 2629. Case 2628 was a Malaysian 81-year-old national who has heart disease. He died in Medical Centre of University Malaya on the morning of 31 March. Case 2629 was a Malaysian 73-year-old male national, who has diabetes and heart disease. He died in Tengku Ampuan Rahimah Hospital of Klang on 30 March.

=== April 2020 ===
On 3 April, one more death were recorded, an 84-year-old Malaysian female national. She has heart disease. She was first treated in Sungai Buloh Hospital, but then got transferred to Institut Jantung Negara, or National Heart Institute. She died on 2 April.

On 6 April, Ministry of Health identified 2 new clusters; one of them is in Selangor. The 2 new clusters were Good News Fellowship Conference which was held in Kuching, Sarawak in late-February, and a wedding ceremony in Bandar Baru Bangi. The wedding ceremony was one of the largest clusters originated in Selangor. Both clusters had spread to five generations.

On 7 April, total cumulative cases of Selangor had breached 1,000.

On 10 April, 1 more death was recorded. The victim was Case 4230, which is a close contact of Case 1684. The deceased was an 88-year-old Malaysian female national who is also a dementia patient, and has hypertension and heart disease. She was treated in University Malaya Medical Centre.

The next day, 11 April, another fatality was recorded. The deceased was a 71-year-old Malaysian man who has diabetes, hypertension and heart disease. His case number was #537 and was treated in Sungai Buloh Hospital. He has been staying in hospital for almost a month.

Another fatality was recorded on 14 April, which was a 65-year-old Malaysian man. He had diabetes, hypertension and kidney disease and was treated in Sungai Buloh Hospital.

One more patient died from COVID-19 on 15 April, a 69-year-old Malaysian man with diabetes and hypertension. He was treated in University Malaya Medical Centre. After a month of daily cases staying above 100, Malaysia's nationwide new cases had finally dropped to double-digit of 85 on 15 April. Total cumulative cases of Malaysia had also breached 5,000.

Another patient had died from COVID-19 in Selangor on 17 April. The deceased was a close contact of Case 2321. He was treated in University Malaya Medical Centre and has hypertension and disease history of stroke. The new cases in Selangor had also dropped back to single digit since mid-March, with only 9 new positive cases.

On 18 April, Selangor reports its 1st foreigner death from COVID-19. The patient was a Burmese male national who was 36-year-old. He had Severe Acute Respiratory Infection (SARI) and was already late-stage while going to hospital, and he died at the same day in Selayang Hospital, Selayang, Gombak District. He was part of the Kuala Lumpur Wholesale Market cluster. He was the 3rd foreigner (with confirmed identity) to die of COVID-19 in Malaysia.

On 21 April, one more person of Selangor died from COVID-19. The deceased is a 72-year-old Malaysian woman. She is the mother of Case 1053 and has diabetes and hypertension. She was treated in Sungai Buloh Hospital.

On 22 April, Selangor records only 1 new positive case, lowest since late February.

On 24 April, a 61-year-old Malaysian man died from COVID-19. He has diabetes, hypertension and kidney disease. He was a close contact of Case 1345 who returned from Indonesia. This patient was treated in Sungai Buloh Hospital.

One more fatality was recorded on 25 April, a 62-year-old Malaysian man. He has heart disease and was treated in Sungai Buloh Hospital.

Malaysia records its 100th death on 28 April. The 100th fatality was a 67-year-old Malaysian man from Selangor. He has diabetes, hypertension, heart disease and stroke. He was treated in Sungai Buloh Hospital.

On 30 April, Selangor reports a high growth rate in new cases. Selangor recorded 27 new cases on 30 April.

On late-April, Ministry of Health had decided to end the Case 26/33 cluster which has no new cases for 28 days.

=== May 2020 ===
On 2 May, Selangor reported 63 new cases, highest since early-April. Total new cases of Malaysia had also risen back to 3-digit number of 105. A day later, an 82-year-old Malaysian man with hypertension and heart disease died in Sungai Buloh Hospital.

On 5 May, a 47-year-old Malaysian man was the new fatality. He was admitted into a private hospital earlier on 15 March and was transferred to intensive care unit (ICU) of Sungai Buloh Hospital after being tested positive. He spent 46 days in ICU. He developed thrombosis on 5 May and died at the same day.

On 6 May, another patient died from COVID-19; a 51-year-old man who has diabetes, hypertension and kidney disease. He was treated in Sungai Buloh Hospital.

On 11 May, one new death was recorded to Selangor: a 63-year-old Malaysian man. He has diabetes and liver cancer and was treated in Kuala Lumpur Hospital.

On 22 May, Selangor records 20 new cases and 1 death, after weeks of stabilized condition. The new deceased was a 65-year-old Malaysian man who have diabetes, hypertension and kidney disease and was treated in Sungai Buloh Hospital.

On 23 May, a new cluster was identified in Selangor; an immigration detention depot in Semenyih. 1,631 detainees and 121 staffs were tested as of the day and 21 is positive.

As cases rises, Selangor reports 46 new cases on 24 May, bringing the total to 1,776.

On 25 May, Malaysia reports 172 new cases nationwide, highest since 11 April. Most of the cases concentrated in Bukit Jalil Immigration Detention Depot of Kuala Lumpur, and Immigration Detention Depot in Selangor had also seen dramatic rise in cases. The next day, Malaysia reports 187 new positive cases, and Selangor's daily cases had also dropped. Kuala Lumpur surpassed Selangor in terms of total cases.

Condition outside Kuala Lumpur had stayed stable since 26 May, as cases inside Bukit Jalil IDD (Immigration Detention Depot) rises.

=== June 2020 ===
On 6 June, 1 more death was reported, a 79-year-old Malaysian woman. She is treated in Sungai Buloh Hospital.

On 10 June, 24th death of Selangor were recorded. The deceased was a 61-year-old Malaysian man. He died after almost three months of treatment in Sungai Buloh Hospital, and he had attended Tablighi Jamaat event in Masjid Sri Petaling in Kuala Lumpur on late-February. He was the latest Tabligh-related death in Malaysia.

On June–July, Most of Selangor's daily cases were imported.

Sabak Bernam, a district mainly of rural areas, had cleared all of the active cases and became the first district of Selangor to get rid of all active cases. Later, Hulu Langat, the former worst affected district of Malaysia, had cleared all of their active cases. Kuala Selangor and Kuala Langat also had got rid all of their active cases in late-June.

Due to new clusters in Sepang, the district saw rise in total cases.

=== July 2020 ===
On 4 July, Selangor recorded seven new cases. All of the new cases were returnees from Saudi Arabia.

=== August 2020 ===
On 1 August, Bukit Tiram cluster, which involved a religious center in Johor Bahru, Johor, had spread to Selangor. The one patient in Selangor was a person who stayed in the center from 16 to 19 July, and was confirmed positive on 1 August.

=== February 2021 ===
On 1 February, Selangor's "State Investment, Industry and Commerce, and Small and Medium Entreprises" (SMEs) chairman Teng Chang Khim has announced that the state's Chinese New Year celebration will be held online via social media due to the ongoing COVID-19 pandemic.
