= Khazanah Nasional =

Malaysian government sovereign wealth fund

Khazanah Nasional Berhad
- Formerly: Khazanah Holdings Berhad (1994–1996)
- Type: State-owned
- Industry: Sovereign wealth fund
- Founded: 3 September 1993; 33 years ago
- Headquarters: Kuala Lumpur, Malaysia
- Key people: Anwar Ibrahim (Chairman); Amirul Feisal Wan Zahir (Managing Director)
- Revenue: ▲MYR 26.93 billion (2025)
- Operating income: ▲MYR 6.64 billion (2025)
- Net income: ▲MYR 7.14 billion (2025)
- Total assets: ▲MYR 176.2 billion (2025)
- Total equity: ▲MYR 77.96 billion (2025)
- Owner: Government of Malaysia
- Parent: Ministry of Finance
- Subsidiaries: Telekom Malaysia; Tenaga Nasional; Malaysia Airports; Malaysia Airlines; UEM Group; ReGen Hospital
- Website: www.khazanah.com.my

Khazanah Nasional Berhad (lit. 'National Treasure Limited'; traded as Khazanah Nasional or simply Khazanah) is the sovereign wealth fund of the Government of Malaysia. One of the largest sovereign wealth funds in the world, it was established to invest surplus revenues for Malaysia. Through its investments and activities, the fund seeks to deliver sustainable economic and societal benefit for the nation. This includes achieving long-term risk-adjusted returns across the portfolio, as well as undertaking investments that catalyse new growth areas, strengthen Malaysia's economic competitiveness, and contribute to priority socioeconomic outcomes.

Headquartered in Kuala Lumpur, it has regional offices in the United States, Turkey, China, United Kingdom and India. Khazanah's portfolio covers a broad spectrum of sectors. Its key focus investment areas include Leisure & Tourism, Banking, Sustainable Development, Healthcare and Consumerism. While it does not receive regular capital infusions, Khazanah relies on its ability to generate returns and tapping capital markets to fund its investments.

Khazanah is a member of the International Forum of Sovereign Wealth Funds (IFSWF), which maintains and promotes the Santiago Principles on best practices in managing sovereign wealth funds. It is also a signatory of the United Nations-supported Principles for Responsible Investment (UNPRI), signatory of the Malaysian Code for Institutional Investors and a member of the Institutional Investor Council (IIC), a member of the FCLT Global (Focusing Capital on the Long Term), and signatory of the Malaysian Anti-Corruption Commission's (MACC) Corporate Integrity Pledge.

In December 2024, the fund had US$36 billion in assets under management. Khazanah is one of the two Malaysia's government-linked investment companies (GLICs) that manages money from the government's excess funds, the other being Retirement Fund (Incorporated).

== Status ==
Khazanah is a company incorporated in Malaysia, and operates under the provisions of the Malaysian Companies Act. It is neither a government agency nor a statutory board, rather it is a national institution that served as a trustee that manages government-owned commercial assets and also investing in multiple high-tech and strategic sectors.

Unlike any other investment companies, Khazanah does not sell its investments and assets to Bank Negara Malaysia, but rather assuming the functions of managing billions of ringgit worths of assets owned by the Federal Government. Modelled after the Singaporean sovereign wealth fund, Temasek Holdings, Khazanah also has its own board of directors and a professional management team.

The Prime Minister of Malaysia, who serves as a Khazanah chairman, have the rights to determine the Khazanah's direction, including to appoint and retaining the members of Khazanah's board of directors and existing managements.

In a 2016 forum, Azman Mokhtar, former Khazanah's Managing Director, said Khazanah had the continuation of a pro-growth and pro-society focus in the 2017 Malaysian Budget, with companies of various sectors under its portfolio remained to be the nation's growth engines. Former Prime Minister and Khazanah chairman, Ismail Sabri Yaakob in the fund's 2021 report, said that Khazanah is in a perfect position to embarked on its Advancing Malaysia initiative. He noted that Khazanah's ability to overcome the specific challenges impacting certain sectors and create sustainable growth for the long term.

== History ==
Khazanah was incorporated under the Malaysian Companies Act 1965 on 3 September 1993 as a public limited company and commenced operations a year later to manage and maximise the return of government assets and equities, thus taking over the functions of the Minister of Finance Incorporated, which administered the fund.

In July 2003, the fund had offer up to 186 million of covered warrants to retail, institutional and selected investors. Later on, Khazanah sets the indicative issue price of its covered warrants at RM6.50.

In 2004, Khazanah became a regular issuer in the global capital markets and supporting Malaysia's aspiration in being the leading hub for Islamic finance through landmark transactions. This include the world's first exchangeable Sharia-compliant bonds known as sukuk and the country's first sustainable and responsible investment sukuk. In May the same year, the Malaysian Government announced a strategic revamp for Khazanah. The revamp saw the fund received a new mandate from the government to be an active shareholder while driving transformation of the Malaysian government-linked companies (GLCs).

In 2005, the fund launches a transformation program and a guideline for the government-owned companies.

In 2015, Khazanah raised $27.1 million from its sukuk to be invested into new government schools.

In 2018, the Government of Malaysia initiated a corporate restructuring and reorganisation of Khazanah, which involved leadership changes, a refresh of its mandate and objectives, and a review and revaluation of its investments.

In April 2020, Khazanah announced it was contributing RM20 million in total to support the relief efforts in response to the ongoing worldwide COVID-19 pandemic.

Prime Minister, Anwar Ibrahim announced in February 2023 that Khazanah will spearheaded the formation of the National Heritage Fund to attract all private participations in restoring historical heritage sites.

On 16 March 2023, Khazanah launched a new initiative called the Future Malaysia Program, under its Dana Impak mandate. The initiative was introduced to support the local ecosystem of entrepreneurs, start-ups, venture funds, and corporate venture programmes through its local and international partners.

The fund assigned its inaugural issuer credit rating of A3 and A− from Moody's Investors Service and S&P Global Ratings, in April 2023, respectively.

The fund had a profit of RM5.9 billion for the 2023 financial year compared to RM1.6 million in 2022. Its assets for 2023 were 4.9% higher than the year before and Khazanah announced a RM1 billion dividend to the government of Malaysia.

Khazanah completed its acquisition of two state-owned venture capital funds, namely the Malaysia Capital Venture Management (MAVCAP) and Penjana Kapital on 30 July 2024. The acquisition and integration of MAVCAP and Penjana Kapital in which Khazanah managing director, Amirul Feisal Wan Zahir said that it "would further strengthen Malaysia's VC ecosystem".

== Governance ==
The fund is owned by the Malaysian government and administered by the Minister of Finance Incorporated, except for one share held by the Federal Land Commissioner. It is governed by a board of directors comprising representatives from the Government and the corporate sector:

- Chairman - Anwar Ibrahim
- Director - Amir Hamzah Azizan
- Member - Goh Ching Yin
- Member - Azian Mohd Aziz
- Member - Wong Kang Hwee
- Member - Mohaiyani Shamsudin
- Member - Amirul Feisal Wan Zahir

Members of the senior management include:

- Managing director - Amirul Feisal Wan Zahir
- Chief Investment Officer - Hisham Hamdan
- Chief Financial Officer - Faridah Bakar Ali

== Investments ==
Khazanah pursues its overall mandate through its 4 investment structures which consists of Investments portfolio, the Dana Impak portfolio, developmental assets and special situations.

=== 1990s ===
In 1995, Khazanah acquire 40% of majority stake in Putrajaya Holdings to undertake the development of Putrajaya. In 1996, the fund formed a joint venture with Bank Industri Berhad and Wafer Technology to develop local expertise in wafer fabrication, which is a core area in the Malaysian semiconductor industry.

In September the same year, Khazanah, through its agreement deal with Usaha Tegas, announced it has acquired 15 per cent of Measat Broadcast Network Systems Sdn. Bhd., the principal owner of satellite television provider, Astro through the subscription of new shares.

Khazanah began issuing a RM1 billion bond where it was the first of a series of bonds aimed at providing a benchmark yield curve.

On 5 December 1997, Khazanah signed a co-operation agreement with British Aerospace for a partnership to develop Malaysia's capability in designing and manufacturing of aerospace products, while enablling Malaysian companies received access to international aerospace work and future aircraft programmes.

In 1999, Khazanah engaged in local bank restructuring by acquiring the equities of several banks, including RHB Bank and Maybank.

=== 2000s ===
In May 2000, Khazanah invested 30% of stake in telecommunications company, TIME dotCom Berhad for investors.

In 2001, Khazanah through its wholly owned subsidiary, Syarikat Danasaham acquire UEM Group for RM3.8 billion. The acquisition aims to recover UEM and heavily indebted Renong.

Khazanah and its subsidiary Santubong Investment, entered into an agreement to take over the 52% stake in Indonesia's Bank Lippo from Swissasia Global in July 2005.

In 2007, Khazanah began its Northern Corridor initiative to spearhead the development of Northern Corridor Economic Region.

Khazanah, together with the Dubai Banking Group and Asia Capital Reinsurance (ACR), has established a joint-venture company, ACR ReTakaful Holdings in May 2008 with a capital base of US$300 million.

In 2008, Khazanah invested in Biotropics Malaysia Berhad to spearhead the development of Malaysian traditional herbs including Tongkat Ali.

=== 2010s ===
In July 2010, Parkway Holdings entire shares were acquired by Khazanahs subsidiary IHH Healthcare. The purchased amounted to $2.6 billion for the remaining 76.1% of shares not owned by IHH.

2011 saw the establishment of M+S Pte. Ltd., a joint-venture between Khazanah and Singaporean investment holding arm, Temasek Holdings. The joint investments saw both Khazanah and Temasek undertaking projects in Iskandar Malaysia and Singapore. Khazanah owns 60% of the joint-venture company while Temasek owns the remaining 40%.

In October 2011, Khazanah issues the first Renminbi sukuk, which is the world's first Renminbi offshore sukuk.

In August 2012, Khazanah's wholly owned subsidiary, Themed Attractions and Resorts invests in Puteri Harbour Family Theme Park for RM115 million.

In April 2013, Khazanah and Sun Life Insurance acquired 98% of CIMB Avia Assurance Berhad for $600 million.

In July 2013, Khazanah through its insurance arm, Avicennia Capital reached an agreement to acquire 90% stake in the Turkish healthcare insurance company, Acibadem Saglik ve Hayat Sigorta for US$252 million.

In August 2014, Khazanah announced its intention to purchase the remaining ownership of Malaysia Airlines from minority shareholders and delist the airline from Malaysia's stock exchange, thereby renationalising the airline.

The fund through its special purpose vehicle, Bukit Galla Investments, has invested in Chinese mobile lending and credit analytics platform, WeLab in January 2016.

Khazanah and Permodalan Nasional Berhad (PNB) had invested a combined RM47 million in entrepreneur Vivy Yusof's fashion e-commerce platform, FashionValet in March 2018. Khazanah contributed about RM27 million while PNB gave RM20 million to acquire minority stakes of the company.

In 2018 Khazanah acquired Prince Court Medical Center and sold it in September 2019 to IHH Healthcare Bhd for RM1.02 billion. In the same year the ReGen Hospital, the first privately owned rehabilitation hospital in Malaysia, was opened. Kazahnah holds 60% of the hospital, while Select Medical holds 40%.

In July 2019, they targeted to expanding its investment exposure in the United States and looking to invest primarily in technology firms utilising data analytics.

In September 2019, Khazanah sold its share in Lintas Marga Sedaya to the Canada Pension Plan Investment Board and Baskhara Utama Sedaya.

In 2019, Khazanah sold $1.36 billion of its shares in seven foreign firms, which included Alibaba Group, Charoen Pokphand and BDO Unibank among others.

=== 2020s ===
In February 2021, Khazanah invested RM3.6 billion into Malaysia Airlines.

In 2021, Khazanah allocates RM6 billion investments through its Dana Impak. The allocation was made to improving household incomes and achieve other socio-economic outcomes.

In May 2022, Khazanah entered into a partnership with South Korea's SK Ecoplant, which included the acquisition of a 30% stake in Khazanah's subsidiary, Cenviro Sdn Bhd, and an $80 million investment by SK Ecoplant.

Khazanah announced in September 2022 that it would eyeing potential investments in Southeast Asia and India while looking at the right time to execute them.

In April 2023, Khazanah invests US$40 million in Indian logistics company, Xpressbees.

The fund invests in Malaysian homegrown insurance technology company, PolicyStreet in June 2023, aiming to enhanced protection for the nation's underserved market.

The fund announced that it will be spearheading a green investment platform to attract domestic and overseas investments. The platform will be operated by UEM Group, a Khazanah subsidiary.

In July 2023, Khazanah partnered with the Singaporean venture capital firm, Antler to help the firm expand its operations in Malaysia while to support the local startup ecosystem.

As early as January 2024, Khazanah and CGC Digital have jointly invested in Southeast Asia's digital finance platform, Funding Societies.

Prime Minister, Anwar Ibrahim announced during the KL20 Summit 2024 in April 2024 that the fund will launch a national "fund-of-funds" to support Malaysian companies with an initial allocation of RM1 billion.

== Sustainability ==
In its sustainability framework that launched on 10 June 2022, Khazanah have set a target of achieving carbon neutral operations by the end of 2023. Another environmental sustainability target is also to aim for net zero emissions by 2050.

== See also ==
- Temasek Holdings – Singaporean sovereign wealth fund.
