= List of banks in Oman =

This is a list of banks in Oman.

== Central bank ==
- Central Bank of Oman

== Local banks ==
- National Bank of Oman
- Bank Muscat
- Bank Dhofar
- Sohar International
- Oman Arab Bank
- Ahlibank
- Bank Nizwa
- Alizz Islamic Bank
- First Abu Dhabi Bank Oman
- Qatar National Bank Oman
- Standard Chartered Bank Oman
- State Bank of India Oman
- Habib Bank Limited Oman
- Beirut Oman Bank
