= COVID-19 pandemic in Johor =

Ongoing COVID-19 viral pandemic in Johor

- Disease: COVID-19
- Pathogen: SARS-CoV-2
- Location: Johor, Malaysia
- First outbreak: Wuhan, Hubei, China
- Index case: Iskandar Puteri
- Arrival date: 25 January 2020
- Confirmed cases: 215,263 (as of 25 October 2021)
- Active cases: <10,000 (as of 25 October 2021)
- Recovered: 201,423 (as of 25 October)
- Deaths: 3,588 (as of 24 October)

Government website
- https://newslab.malaysiakini.com/covid-19/en/state/johor (Non government)

The COVID-19 pandemic in Johor, Malaysia started on 25 January 2020 when three Chinese tourists from Wuhan, the source of the outbreak, was tested positive in Iskandar Puteri. As of 24 October 2021, Johor confirmed more than 210,000 cases and over 3,500 deaths. Johor ranked third in the highest number of confirmed cases among any state in Malaysia, just behind Selangor and Sarawak

== Statistics ==
Distribution of cumulative confirmed cases in districts of Johor (as of 15 August 2020)
Districts		Confirmed	Active
1	Batu Pahat(N)	53	0
2	Johor Bahru	188	6
3	Kluang	243	4
4	Kota Tinggi(N)	28	0
5	Kulai(N)	45	0
6	Mersing(N)	4	0
7	Muar(N)	52	0
8	Pontian(N)	18	0
9	Segamat(N)	20	0
10	Tangkak(N)	15	0
11	Imported	85	4
Total		750	11

(N)=No new cases in past 14 days

Deaths by hospitals in Johor (as of 8 July 2020)
Hospital		Deaths
1	Enche' Besar Hajjah Khalsom Hospital	13 (inc 1 patient from Perlis)
2	Sultanah Fatimah Specialist Hospital	4
3	Permai Hospital	2
4	Sultan Ismail Hospital	1
5	Sultanah Aminah Hospital	1
6	Sultanah Nora Ismail Hospital	1

=== Data of death cases ===
Details of the confirmed death cases in Johor as of 8 July 2020
Case Number		Date of Death	Nationality	Gender	Age	Hospitalised Location	Patient Data	Source
1	178	17 March 2020	Malaysia	Male	34	Permai Hospital	Attended Tabligh event in Kuala Lumpur in late February. Developed fever on 5 March 2020 and was diagnosed on 12 March and was treated in Permai Hospital. Died on March 17 in ICU. It was the first death announced by Ministry of Health.	
2	1114	23 March 2020	Malaysia	Male	70	Enche' Besar Hajjah Khalsom Hospital	Attended Tabligh event in Kuala Lumpur. Died in Kluang Hospital on 12 am, March 23.	
3	1519	24 March 2020	Malaysia	Male	71	Sultanah Fatimah Specialist Hospital	Has close contact with a Tabligh attendant. Died on March 24, 5:35 am.	
4	1251	25 March 2020	Malaysia	Male	66	Sultanah Fatimah Specialist Hospital	Hospitalised on March 20 and died on March 25, 4:10 am. Has chronic illnesses.	
5	1625	23 March 2020	Malaysia	Male	56	Sultan Ismail Hospital	Hospitalised on March 20 and died on March 23, 2 am. Tested positive for COVID-19 on 25 March, 2 days after his death. Had chronic illnesses.	
6	1246	25 March 2020	Malaysia	Female	68	Sultanah Nora Ismail Hospital	Hospitalised on 19 March and treated in intensive care unit. Died on 25 March, 12:53 am.	
7	1797	23 March 2020	Malaysia	Male	48	Enche' Besar Hajjah Khalsom Hospital	Had contact with Tabligh participant. Died at 8:15 pm, March 23.	
8	2162	28 March 2020	Malaysia	Male	61	Sultanah Fatimah Specialist Hospital	Died at 10:50 am, March 28. Have diabetes and hypertension. First treated at Hospital of Tangkak on March 24 and transferred to Muar Hospital the next day.	
9	1239	28 March 2020	Malaysia	Male	50	Enche' Besar Hajjah Khalsom Hospital	Attended Tabligh event. Had hypertension and died at 7:44 pm, March 28.	
10	1249	28 March 2020	Malaysia	Male	37	Permai Hospital	Have travel history to India. Died at 11:25 pm, March 28.	
11	2627	26 March 2020	Malaysia	Male	69	Enche' Besar Hajjah Khalsom Hospital	Died on March 26, 1:03 pm. Had diabetes and hypertension.	
12	2909	31 March 2020	Malaysia	Male	37	Sultanah Aminah Hospital	Had chronic illnesses and low immunity. Died at 11:10 pm, March 31.	
13	2910	29 March 2020	Malaysia	Male	78	Sultanah Fatimah Specialist Hospital	Had hypertension and gout. Died at 9:10 pm, March 29.	
14	2572	2 April 2020	Malaysia	Male	85	Enche' Besar Hajjah Khalsom Hospital	Had diabetes, hypertension and heart disease. Died at 8:01 am, April 2.	
15	1649	14 April 2020	Malaysia	Male	81	Enche' Besar Hajjah Khalsom Hospital	Had close contact with case 343 which attended Tabligh. Died at 11:50 am, April 14. Had diabetes.	
16	4769	18 April 2020	Malaysia	Male	51	Enche' Besar Hajjah Khalsom Hospital	Had diabetes, hypertension, heart and kidney disease. Close contact with case 2726. Died on April 18, 2020, 6:47 pm.	
17	3871	23 April 2020	Malaysia	Female	32	Enche' Besar Hajjah Khalsom Hospital	A MOH nurse in Muar. Had hypertension and close contact with case 3662. Died at 12:36 am, April 23. It was the third healthcare worker that died of COVID-19 in Malaysia.	
18	4087	27 April 2020	Malaysia	Male	78	Enche' Besar Hajjah Khalsom Hospital	Had diabetes, hypertension and stroke. Died at 4:31 am, April 27.	
19	5195	13 May 2020	Malaysia	Male	90	Enche' Besar Hajjah Khalsom Hospital	Had hypertension and chronic respiratory disease. Died at 10:26 am, May 13.	
20	7733	4 June 2020	Malaysia	Male	61	Enche' Besar Hajjah Khalsom Hospital	Had diabetes, hypertension and kidney cancer. Died at 10:20 pm, June 4.	
21	8770	17 July 2020	Malaysia	Male	72	Enche' Besar Hajjah Khalsom Hospital	A resident at an old folks home in Kluang who had hypertension and stroke. He developed fever and cough on 10 July and was admitted to Enche' Besar Hajjah Khalsom Hospital on 17 July, where he died in emergency room suddenly at 12:51 am. His results were only out 2 days after his death.	

Details of the confirmed death cases in Johor from other states as of 16 June 2020
Case Number		Date of Death	Nationality	Gender	Age	State of origin	Hospitalised Location	Patient Data	Source
1	3794	6 April 2020	Malaysia	Male	71	Perlis	Enche' Besar Hajjah Khalsom Hospital	Attended religious gatherings in Sulawesi, Indonesia from March 17–24. Returned to Perlis and was transported to Kluang after being diagnosed. Died at 11 pm, April 6.	

=== Graph ===
Total cases in Johor

View source data.

New cases per day

View source data.

== Timeline ==
=== January 2020 ===
On 24 January 2020, eight Chinese nationals who had contact with a confirmed case in Singapore from Wuhan entered Malaysia through Tuas checkpoint of Singapore. They were quarantined in a hotel of Iskandar Puteri and tested negative on 24 January, but three of them were tested positive on the next day. All of first 3 patients of Malaysia were quarantined in Sungai Buloh Hospital of Sungai Buloh in Selangor.

At the same day, a 40-years old Chinese male national from Wuhan entered Malaysia via Woodland checkpoint and developed fever on 23 January. He went to a private hospital for examination before being referred to Sultanah Aminah Hospital. After he was diagnosed with similar virus, he was referred to Permai Hospital in Tampoi for treatment. He was given the human immunodeficiency virus (or HIV) drugs on 28 January.

On 27 January, the Ministry of Health announced that 26 hospitals nationwide will be used to handle suspected and confirmed cases of COVID-19 (2019-nCoV as of January 27). It includes Sultanah Aminah Hospital that will be used as referral centre of suspected or positive cases in Johor. Any suspected case or stable positive cases will be treated and monitored by Hospital Sultanah Aminah's infectious disease medical team in the isolation ward of Permai Hospital. Permai Hospital used to be a hospital to treat patients with mental problems.

A day later, on 28 January, one of the eight quarantined Chinese nationals in Iskandar Puteri was tested positive for COVID-19. Just like her relatives, she was quarantined in Sungai Buloh Hospital. She was the mother of case 2 and 3.

A 52-years old Chinese national from Wuhan was tested positive at the same day, taking the total cases in Malaysia to 7, with 4 hospitalised in Selangor, 2 in Johor, and 1 in Kedah. 2 days later, his wife was also tested positive for COVID-19. Both patients were hospitalised in Permai Hospital.

=== February 2020 ===
Between 3 and 5 February, Malaysia reported 6 new cases and first locally transmissioned case in Kedah, but none of them is in Johor. On 6 February, a 59-year old Chinese female national from Wuhan was tested positive with COVID-19 in Johor Bahru. She arrived in Singapore on 17 January with her husband, son and daughter-in law and entered Malaysia on 21 January. She developed fever on 26 January but she didn't go to any medical centre for checkups, instead she took antipyretic and stayed indoors. She had planned to fly to Guangzhou on 4 February with her daughter-in law and son, but wasn't accompanied by her husband due to her physical discomfort. On 5 February, the management of her residence reported her condition to Health Department of Malaysia and she got taken to Permai Hospital and tested positive for COVID-19.

On 8 February, the 4th patient of Malaysia that was treated in Permai Hospital was finally allowed to be discharged after being tested negative for three times. This makes him the first to be discharged in Johor.

On 14 February, 4 Chinese nationals that were treated in Sungai Buloh Hospital were also discharged. 2 days later, the 15th case who was treated in Permai Hospital was also discharged.

On 18 February, the Chinese couple that were treated in Permai Hospital were discharged. All cases in Johor now have recovered all of their cases.

Details of the earlier cases in Johor
Case Number		Date of Diagnosis	Nationality	Entered from	Gender	Age	Hospitalised Location	Source	Status
1	1	25 January 2020	China	Singapore	Female	65	Sungai Buloh Hospital	Imported	Discharged on 14 February
2	2	25 January 2020	China	Singapore	Male	11	Sungai Buloh Hospital	Imported	Discharged on 14 February
3	3	25 January 2020	China	Singapore	Male	2	Sungai Buloh Hospital	Imported	Discharged on 14 February
4	4	25 January 2020	China	Singapore	Male	40	Permai Hospital	Imported	Discharged on 14 February
5	5	28 January 2020	China	Singapore	Female	36	Sungai Buloh Hospital	Imported	Discharged on 14 February
6	7	28 January 2020	China	—N/a	Male	52	Permai Hospital	Imported	Discharged on 18 February
7	8	30 January 2020	China	—N/a	Female	49	Permai Hospital	Imported	Discharged on 18 February
8	15	6 February 2020	China	Singapore	Female	59	Permai Hospital	Imported	Discharged on 16 February

On 27 February, Malaysia confirmed 1 new case in Kuala Lumpur, a Malaysian woman who returned from Japan, marking the beginning of the 2nd wave. The cases started to rise significantly, mostly from Case 26 and 33. But Johor isn't affected until mid-March.

On 27 February, a Tabligh Jamaat event was held in Masjid Sri Petaling, Kuala Lumpur. 15,000 had attended including residents from Johor. A Malaysian man in South Korea returned to attend the Tabligh event, and he's believed to be the index case of the cluster.

=== March 2020 ===
On 16 March, Johor had 52 cases. At 9 pm of the same day, the prime minister of Malaysia, Muhyiddin Yassin, held a nationwide telecast and announced the Movement Control Order, or MCO, which will start on 18 March and end on 31 March. This made the Malaysians working in Singapore returns to Singapore the next morning.

On 17 March, Johor reported 25 new cases, bringing the total cases to 77. Johor also reported its first death on 17 March, a 34-year-old man that attended the Tabligh event. It was the second death of COVID-19 pandemic in Malaysia, as the Ministry of Health of Sarawak had reported the death of a 60-year old pastor from the church cluster in Kuching.

On 18 March, the Movement Control Order officially started. Johor reported 11 new cases at the same day, bringing the total in Johor to 88. Malaysia also reported 117 new cases at the same day, bringing the national total to 790. The fatalities stayed at 2. The next day, Johor's total cases surpassed 100. As of 19 March, Malaysia had 900 cases, 101 of them in Johor.

On 20 March, Malaysia had reported 130, making the total cases surpass 1,000. Johor reported 13 new cases, bringing the total in Johor to 114. Malaysia also reported 1 new death in Tawau, Sabah. On 21 March, Johor reported 15 new cases, bringing the total to 129. Malaysia had 153 new cases and 1 new death in Malacca on 21 March. Johor's new cases everyday stayed average, as Johor reported 16 new cases (out of 123 new cases) on 22 March.

On 23 March, Johor reported its 2nd death. The death is a 70-year-old man that attended Tabligh Jamaat in Kuala Lumpur. He died on 23 March in Kluang's Enche Besar Hajjah Khalsom Hospital. This is the 12th death of Malaysia. Johor also reported 13 new cases, bringing the state total to 158. The next day, 24 March, Johor reported 4 new cases, and 1 new death in Muar, a 71-year-old man that have close contact with a Tabligh participant. He was the 15th death reported in Malaysia.

On 25 March, Johor reported 34 new cases, mostly in the 2 villages near Simpang Renggam in District of Kluang, Kampung Datuk Ibrahim Majid and Bandar Baharu Datuk Ibrahim Majid. Both of the villages are in Mukim of Ulu Benut. This brings the total cases in Johor to 196, and 1 new red zone of Johor (Kluang). Johor also reported 3 new deaths: 1 in Hospital Pakar Sultanah Fatimah, Muar, 1 in Hospital Sultan Ismail, Johor Bahru, and 1 in Hospital Sultanah Nora Ismail, Batu Pahat. The death in Hospital Sultan Ismail died on 23 March but test result was positive only on 25 March, 2 days after his death. At the same day, prime minister, Muhyiddin Yassin extends MCO until April 12.

The next day, Mukim of Ulu Benut in Kluang spikes again, causing Johor to report 43 new cases. Johor had 3rd highest daily case in Malaysia on 26 March, behind Kuala Lumpur and Selangor. Johor also reported another death on 26 March in Kluang's EBHK (Enche' Besar Hajjah Khalsom) Hospital. The deceased was a 48-year-old man who had close contact with a Tabligh participant. Kluang also had surpassed Johor Bahru District in total cumulative cases, becoming most affected district of Johor. Also on 26 March, Kluang Hospital was announced as Johor's second COVID-19 hospital.

On 26 March, Datuk Seri Ismail Sabri Yaakob, Minister of Defence of Malaysia, announced that 2 villages of Ulu Benut, Kluang will be placed under Enhanced Movement Control Order, or EMCO. Residents won't be allowed to step out of their homes. Social Welfare Department will supply residents with basic necessities during the EMCO. At the next day, Johor recorded 20 new cases and no deaths, bringing the total to 259.

On 28 March, Kluang's village cluster cases rose as Johor recorded 26 new cases. A 61-year-old man died in Muar Hospital, bringing the death toll in Johor to 8, and total cases to 285.

On 29 March, 24 new cases and 2 new deaths were confirmed. The deaths were both male, 50 and 37-year old, both died in Kluang Hospital and Permai Hospital respectively. Johor's total deaths had reached 10, making Johor the deadliest state of Malaysia. The total cases in Kluang District had no change as it stays at 97.

On 30 March, Johor recorded 24 new cases again, bringing the total to 333. No deaths are recorded but cases in Kluang has surpassed 100. The total cumulative cases in Johor Bahru had also surpassed Kluang.

On 31 March, Johor recorded 16 new cases and 1 death. The fatality is a 69-year-old man who was hospitalised in Kluang Hospital, Johor.

=== April 2020 ===
On the first day of April, Johor recorded 19 new cases and no fatal cases (Both fatalities of 1 April in Malaysia were in Kuala Lumpur).

The next day, 2 April, 27 new cases were recorded, highest since 26 March. Three new fatalities were recorded, all of them were male and have chronic disease. They were 37, 78 and 85-year old, and died in Hospital of Johor Bahru (Sultanah Aminah), Muar and Kluang respectively. Johor has total cases of 395 and deaths of 14.

On 3 April, Johor recorded 21 new cases, causing the cases to surpass 400, as the total cases reach 416. No new fatalities were reported.

On 4 April, only 6 new confirmed cases were reported in Johor. No new fatalities were reported, as the cumulative cases reached 422.

On 5 April, 16 cases were recorded in Johor, bringing the total cases to 438. While the fatalities stayed at 12. At the same day, cases in Kluang had outnumbered Johor Bahru after 6 days of staying at 2nd. As of 5 April, Kluang had confirmed 147 cases, while Johor Bahru 139. On the same day, on 5 April, the Johor Immigration Department announced that Malaysians with Singaporean work permits would be required to take swab tests in Singaporean clinics and hospitals to show that they are free of the coronavirus to return to Johor.[78] That same day, Deputy Foreign Minister Kamaruddin announced that the Government had brought back 4,811 stranded Malaysians from affected countries. He also upgraded the number of Malaysians stranded abroad to 2,298: 1,016 in India, 172 in Thailand, 136 in New Zealand, 128 in Pakistan, 122 in Vietnam, 83 in Saudi Arabia, 77 in Australia, 66 in the Philippines, 65 in Sri Lanka, and 43 in Nepal.

On 6 April, Johor recorded 30 new cases, the highest since 26 March. Most of the new cases were still in Kluang. Johor had no new fatalities for four days in a row, and total cases in Johor had reached 468.

Meanwhile, active cases in Malaysia had started to drop since mid-February after daily recoveries outnumbered daily cases. Malaysia has reported 131 new cases, 1 new fatality in Terengganu and 236 new recoveries.

On 7 April, 10 new cases were recorded in Johor, bringing the total to 478. Kluang Hospital had 1 new fatality but it's counted in Perlis's death toll, since the patient was a 71-year-old man who was from Perlis that referred to EBHK Hospital. He attended a religious gatherings in Sulawesi, Indonesia on March 17.

On 8 April, 18 new cases were recorded in Johor, bringing the total to 496. No fatalities were recorded, this is the sixth day in a row in which no fatalities of Johoreans from COVID-19 were recorded in Johor.

On 9 April, only 7 new cases were recorded, bringing the total to 503. No deaths were recorded.

On 10 April, the cases in Ulu Benut village cluster began to rise again. 20 new cases were recorded, and no deaths for the eighth consecutive day. The total cases in Johor had reached 523. Prime minister, Muhyiddin Yassin also announced that MCO will be extended until 28 April on 10 April.

On 11 April, 21 more cases are recorded, bringing the total to 544. No deaths were recorded.

On 12 April, the daily cases had dropped to the average of 14, taking the total to 558. Death toll of Johor stayed in 14.

On 13 April, 21 new cases were recorded, bringing the total to 579. No deaths were recorded for the tenth consecutive day.

On 14 April, the daily cases in Johor had dropped to single digit, with only 8 new cases recorded. 4 of the 8 new cases in Johor were in District of Muar, bringing the total in Muar to 44, making it the 4th red zone of Johor. The 10-days no fatality run in Johor was ended after an 81-year-old man died in Kluang Hospital. This brings the total cases in Johor to 587 and deaths to 15. Enhanced Movement Control Order for two villages of Ulu Benut had also been extended until 28 April.

On 15 April, 14 new cases were recorded, taking the total to 601. The fatalities stayed at 15. The daily cases of Malaysia had also dropped to the double-digit of 85, lowest since 14 March.

On 16 April, 13 new cases were recorded, meaning the total will be brought to 614. No deaths were recorded.

On 17 April, only 9 new cases were reported in Johor. Thus, the total has been brought to 623. Johor has the third most cases in Malaysia as of 17 April. The death toll stayed at 15.

On 18 April, 16 new cases were recorded in Johor. No deaths were recorded. Kulai's total cases had reached 41, making it 5th red zone of Johor.

On 19 April, Johor recorded 3 new cases, lowest since 14 March. 1 new fatality was recorded. The victim was a 51-year-old man who have close contact with case 2726. He died in Kluang Hospital on 18 April.

Johor's total daily cases had started to decrease. On 23 April, a 32-year-old female nurse died in Kluang Hospital, making her the 17th death of Johor. On 25 April, Johor records 0 new cases, first time since early March. On 27 April, 1 more fatality was reported. The victim was a 78-year-old man who died in EBHK Hospital of Kluang.

=== May 2020 ===
On 4 May, District of Johor Bahru had exited the red zone after the active cases dropped from 46 to 37. Kluang is the remaining red zone of Johor as of 4 May in terms of active cases. Johor's total cumulative cases had declined since May.

On 13 May, Johor reported its 19th fatality of COVID-19, a 90-year-old man who died after almost a month in hospital.

In late May, Malaysia saw a major rise of cases in immigration detention depot, mostly in Bukit Jalil. Johor isn't effected, but several imported cases from neighbouring Singapore were reported.

=== June 2020 ===
On 4 June, Malaysia reports 277 new cases of COVID-19, making it the highest new cases a day of Malaysia, but situation in Johor stayed stable. 270 of 277 new cases are in Bukit Jalil Immigration Detention Depot.

On 5 June, another fatality was recorded in Kluang Hospital. The victim was a 61-year-old man who have chronic illness.

On 21 June, Johor records 1 locally transmitted case in Pulai, Johor Bahru, after weeks of no local cases in Johor.

On 23 June, the remaining active case of Batu Pahat in Simpang Kanan mukim has recovered, making Johor Bahru the remaining yellow zone of Johor. A few days later, Kluang registered another new local case in Ulu Benut.

=== July 2020 ===
After the patient in Pulai recovered, Kluang is the remaining area with active local cases. Kluang's remaining patient had recovered few days later, making Johor as a local active case-free state since March.

On 19 July, one more local case was recorded: a 72-year old deceased Malaysian man. He was a resident at an old folks home in Kluang and had hypertension and stroke-related health issues. He developed fever and cough on 10 July and seven days later, he was rushed to EBHK Hospital of Kluang and died in the ER. He was diagnosed posthumously.

On 20 July, Johor records a spike in cases, due to an old folks home in Kluang. The cluster was caused by Case 8770, who was diagnosed posthumously. 14 new cases were recorded in Johor as of noon, 20 July, which is the majority of new cases in Malaysia.

In late July, another major cluster was identified in Johor; a religious center in Taman Bukit Tiram of Johor Bahru. This cluster involved the owner of the house and an imported case from Philippines.

=== August 2020 ===
The Bukit Tiram cluster which originated from Johor Bahru had spread to Selangor on 1 August. He stayed in the religious center from 16 to 19 July and returned to Selangor afterwards.
