= Ominvest =

Investment holding company based in Oman

Oman International Development and Investment Company SAOG
- Company type: Public
- Traded as: MSM: OMVS; MSM 30 component
- Industry: Financial services; Property development; Fast-moving consumer goods
- Founded: 11 September 1983; 42 years ago
- Headquarters: Shati Al-Qurm, Muscat, Oman
- Key people: Khalid bin Muhammad Al Zubair (Chairman); Abdulaziz Mohammed Al-Balushi (CEO)
- Revenue: ▲RO88 million (2014)
- Net income: ▼RO28 million (2014)
- Total assets: ▲RO1,864 million (2014)
- Total equity: ▼RO237 million (2014)
- Subsidiaries: Oman Arab Bank SAOC; National Life & General Insurance Company SAOC
- Website: www.ominvest.net

Oman International Development and Investment Company SAOG (commonly known as Ominvest) is an investment holding company based in Oman. It holds significant stakes in various Omani companies, ranging from financial services, property development, food, and the industrial sector.

Ominvest's key subsidiaries are Oman Arab Bank (51 percent; the remaining owned by Arab Bank) and National Life & General Insurance Company (NLG), which contribute significantly to the company's earnings. Other investments include; finance companies National Finance Company and Oman Orix Leasing Company, food producer National Biscuit Industries, industrial companies Oman Chlorine, National Detergent Company and Modern Steel Mills, and tourism company Salalah Resorts.

Internationally, the company has stakes in Dubai-based International General Insurance, National Finance House in Bahrain, and Budva Beach Properties in Montenegro.

In 2015, the company merged with Oman National Investment Corp (ONIC). At the time, analysts said the combination of the two companies would create a larger investment fund and achieve economies of scale for their operating subsidiaries. Gulf Baader Capital Markets also pointed to possible listings of Oman Arab Bank and NLG when market conditions are favorable.
