= OAB =

OAB may stand for:

- Order of Attorneys of Brazil (Ordem dos Advogados do Brasil), the Brazilian Bar Association
- The Oxford Annotated Bible
- Oita Asahi Broadcasting, a television station in Oita Prefecture, Japan
- Oman Arab Bank, a bank in Oman
- Overactive bladder, a urological syndrome
- Oriental Air Bridge, airline
