= Asia Capital Reinsurance =

Singapore-based reinsurance company

Asia Capital Reinsurance Group (Asia Capital Re)
- Industry: Reinsurance
- Founded: November 2006
- Founder: Tan Kwang Kherng
- Headquarters: Singapore
- Website: www.asiacapitalre.com

Asia Capital Reinsurance Group ("Asia Capital Re") is a Singapore-based reinsurance company. It was founded in 2006 by Tan Kwang Kherng, Khazanah Nasional Berhad, and 3i. In May 2008, Asia Capital Re launched ACR ReTakaful Holdings Limited, a joint venture between Khazanah Nasional Berhad and the Dubai Islamic Investment Group. In 2019, Asia Capital Re stopped writing new business, and in 2020, ACR was acquired by Catalina Holdings (Bermuda) Ltd. Wei-Lyn Loh became CEO of Asia Capital Re in 2022.

== History ==
=== 2006-2014 ===
Asia Capital Re was founded in November 2006 by Tan Kwang Kherng, who served as the company's first Group Chief Executive Officer (CEO). The company was co-founded with strategic financial support from Khazanah Nasional Berhad, Malaysia's sovereign wealth fund, and 3i, a private equity firm from the United Kingdom.

Asia Capital Re gained recognition early in its operations as a leading regional reinsurance provider. The company became known for providing reinsurance solutions across various lines, including property, motor, marine, agriculture, engineering, and aviation, serving clients across the pan-Asian region. In its first year of operation, it received an initial financial strength rating of A− (Excellent) from AM Best, the world's leading credit rating agency. This rating, one of the highest among Asian reinsurers, was reaffirmed in December 2007.

Beyond Singapore, ACR expanded its footprint with a joint venture reinsurance company in Malaysia, as well as representative offices in Taipei and Bahrain.

=== 2015-2025 ===
Tan Kwang Kherng, the company's founder, served as Group CEO until 2015, when he retired due to medical advice. He remained involved in a non-executive role as founder and senior advisor. In 2015, Hans-Peter Gerhardt succeeded Tan as Group Chief Executive Officer. Gerhardt, who brought extensive global insurance experience to the company, announced his intention to step down in 2017. Following Gerhardt's departure, Bobby Heerasing joined the company as Deputy CEO in 2017 and subsequently assumed leadership as Acting CEO. Heerasing was later confirmed as CEO and Executive Director, a role he held until 2020. During his tenure, he played a significant role in steering the company through its acquisition by Catalina Holdings.

==== Cessation of new business ====
As of December 5, 2019, Asia Capital Re stopped writing new business, while continuing to service existing policies until their expiration date.

==== Acquisition by Catalina Holdings ====
In March 2020, ACR was acquired by Catalina Holdings (Bermuda) Ltd., a specialist in managing legacy (re)insurance portfolios. This acquisition marked Catalina's entry into the Asian market and expanded its total assets to approximately US$7.2 billion.

In 2020, after Catalina Holdings acquired Asia Capital Re, Martin Kauer was appointed as CEO and CFO. Kauer, who previously served as CEO and CFO of Glacier Reinsurance AG, focused on integrating Asia Capital Re into Catalina Holdings’ global operations during his tenure. On June 13, 2022, Wei-Lyn Loh was appointed CEO of Asia Capital Re.

== Joint ventures ==
=== ACR ReTakaful Holdings ===
In May 2008, Asia Capital Re launched ACR ReTakaful Holdings Limited, a joint venture between Khazanah Nasional Berhad, the investment arm of the Malaysian government, and the Dubai Islamic Investment Group, a global Sharia-compliant investment company. ACR ReTakaful Holdings Limited aimed to establish operations in both Malaysia and the Middle East, with the intention of leveraging its partners’ strengths in financial stability, networks, and access to local markets. By doing so, it contributed to the development of the retakaful sector, which historically saw much of its business ceded to international markets outside of Asia. The new entity was established with an initial capital of US$300 million, positioning it as the world's largest retakaful (Islamic reinsurance) company at the time. The company is headquartered at the Dubai International Financial Centre and focuses on providing Sharia-compliant reinsurance solutions.
