= Currency Museum, Muscat =

Museum in Muscat, Oman

Oman Currency Museum
- Established: April 9, 1999; 25 years ago
- Location: Muscat, Oman
- Coordinates: 23.600400°N 58.546785°E

The Currency Museum (Arabic: متحف العملات) is a museum located in the capital of Oman. The museum is dedicated to the history of currency used in Oman.

== History ==
In April 1999, the Central Bank of Oman inaugurated the museum, with the aim of exhibiting the history of money used in Oman.

== Collections ==
The museum contains exhibits about the circulation of coins and banknotes in the Sultanate of Oman. Exhibits at the museum focus on minting in Oman during the Islamic and pre-Islamic periods. In addition, the museum contains information about the history of coins before the period of the issuance of Saidi Rial, the first national currency of Oman. The museum exhibits one of the first Islamic silver dirhams. The museum also contains specimens of foreign imperial currency such as the Maria Theresa thaler, used in Oman during the period from 1801 to 1970. The museum also contains Gulf rupees issued by the Government of India and used by Gulf countries. The museum owns a silver dirham called Uman, minted during the Umayyad dynasty under the rule of Abd al-Malik ibn Marwan, the dirham is one of the oldest minted in the Arabian Peninsula. The museum contains collections of commemorative coins issued on Omani National Days. The museum contains coins that were produced locally called Baiza Coins. The museum also has exhibits of the Islamic ashrafi.
