= Said bin Salim Al Shaksy =

Omani businessman (1934–2015)

Said bin Salim Al Shaksy (Arabic: سعيد بن سالم الشقصي; 1934 – September 2015) was an Omani businessman who was the founder and chairman of The Shaksy Group. Al Shaksy has been a member and managing director of several Joint-Stock Companies, including Al Bank Al Ahli Al Omani SAOG, Oman Fisheries Co. SAOG and Oman Hotels Co. SAOG.

Prior to starting his own business, Al Shaksy played a key role in the Omani government, he was the first Undersecretary at the Ministry of Health Sultanate of Oman in 1970. Later Al Shaky became the Consul General of the Sultanate of Oman, Karachi, Pakistan (1975). He also held the position of Deputy Director Trucial States Council; presently United Arab Emirates federal government (1967). Before that he held the position of Credit Investigator in Citibank Dubai, UAE (1964). Earlier he worked for the Zanzibar Government as Assistant Secretary & Protocol Officer in the Chief Minister's Office for one year and as a Principal Assistant Secretary in the Ministry of Finance for 2 1/2 years (1960). He also was a Management Trainee at the East African Tobacco Co. in Kenya (1960).

Al Shaksy received a BA in Political Science, Economics and English Literature from the University of London in 1960. He has also completed a UN Fellowship in Commercial Policy and Principles of GATT in 1962, and a UN Fellowship in Development Financing in 1963.

Al Shaksy was a private art collector and also an artist himself. He died in September 2015, shortly before his 81st birthday.

== See also ==
- Salaam bin Said Al Shaksy
- The Shaksy Group
