= Dubai Bank =

Islamic bank in Dubai

- Company type: Public
- Industry: Islamic banking and finance
- Founded: September 2002
- Defunct: 1 December 2012
- Fate: Acquired by Emirates NBD
- Headquarters: Dubai, UAE
- Website: www.dubaibank.ae

Dubai Bank was an Islamic bank based in Dubai, UAE. The bank was launched in September 2002 and transformed into Shari’a-compliant financial institution on 1 January 2007. Dubai Bank was part of the Dubai Group, a Dubai Holdings company. On 1 December 2012 the bank was acquired by Emirates NBD.

== History ==
The bank increased its capital to AED 1.50 billion in 2007 and was on an expansion spree, and as of March 2008 had total assets of AED 14.4 billion. The bank as of the end of 2007 had 15 branches spread across UAE and had more aggressive plans in 2008 including opening another 10 branches.

As per the pre orders from the Ruler of Dubai on 11 October 2011, Emirates NBD was set to take over Dubai Bank. There were no financial details available.

On 11 October 2011, media reports stated that Emirates NBD was set to take over Dubai Bank.
