= Taimur bin Asa'ad =

Omani royal (born 1981)

Taimur bin Asa'ad: تيمور بن أسعد آل سعيد
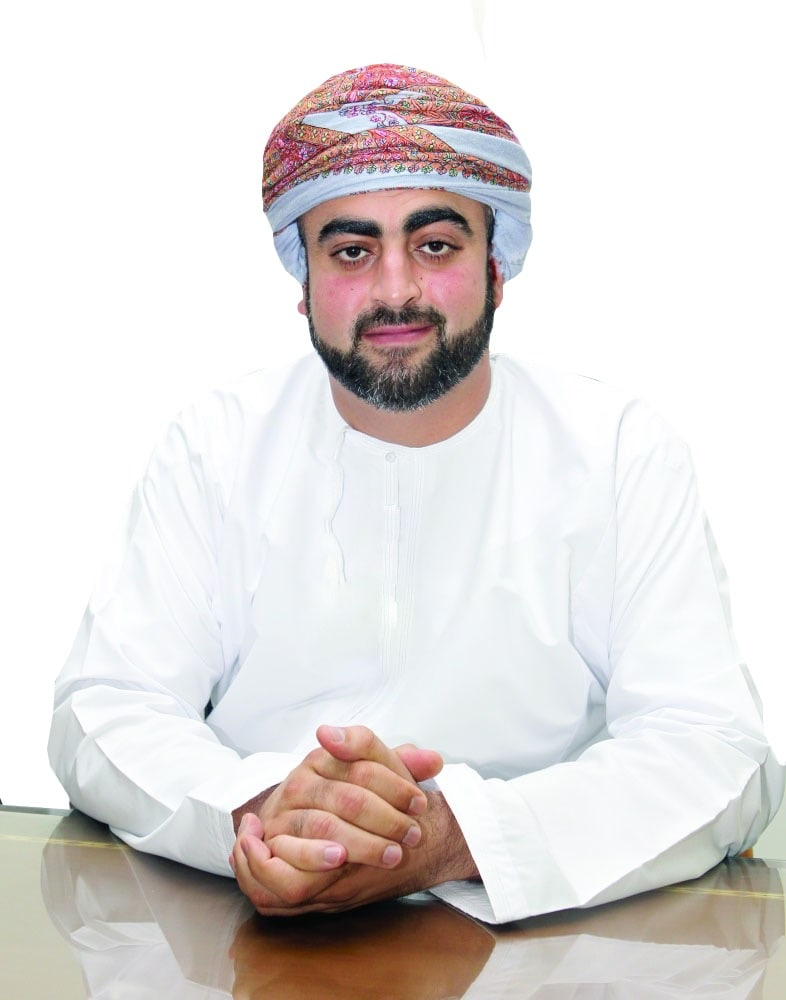

Chairman of the board of directors of the Central Bank of Oman
- Incumbent
- Assumed office August 2020
- Monarch: Haitham bin Tariq
- Prime Minister: Haitham bin Tariq
- Born: 1980 (age 45–46); Muscat, Oman
- Spouse: Salma bint Mustahil Al Mashani (m. 2004)
- Issue: Asa'ad (b.2005)
- House: Al Bu Sa'id
- Father: Asa'ad bin Tariq
- Mother: Na'emah bint Badr
- Religion: Ibadi Islam

Sayyid Taimur bin Asa'ad Al Said (Arabic: تيمور بن أسعد آل سعيد) is a member of the Omani royal family and the chairman of the board of governors of the Central Bank of Oman.

== Early life ==
Taimur was born in 1980 to Sayyid Asa'ad bin Tariq Al Said, the Deputy Prime Minister of Oman, and Sayyida Na'emah bint Badr Al Busaidiyah.

He married Salma bint Mustahil Al Mashani in 2004. Salma is a first cousin of Sultan Qaboos bin Said on his mother, Mazoon bint Ahmad Al Mashani's side and he is thought to have personally arranged the match.

== Career ==
Taimur served on the board of directors of Bank Dhofar until 2011. In 2012, he founded and chairs Alizz Islamic Bank.

In August 2020, Taimur was announced as the chairman of the newly created board of governors of the Central Bank of Oman and in January 2025, he was appointed to a second five-year term. In his role has chairman, Taimur is also a member of the Council of Ministers of Oman.

Sayyid Taimur also undertakes royal engagements on behalf of his uncle, Sultan Haitham bin Tariq.

== Titles, styles, and honors ==
=== Title and style ===
- 1980–present: His Highness Sayyid Taimur bin Asa'ad bin Tariq Al Said.

=== Honors ===
- Oman:
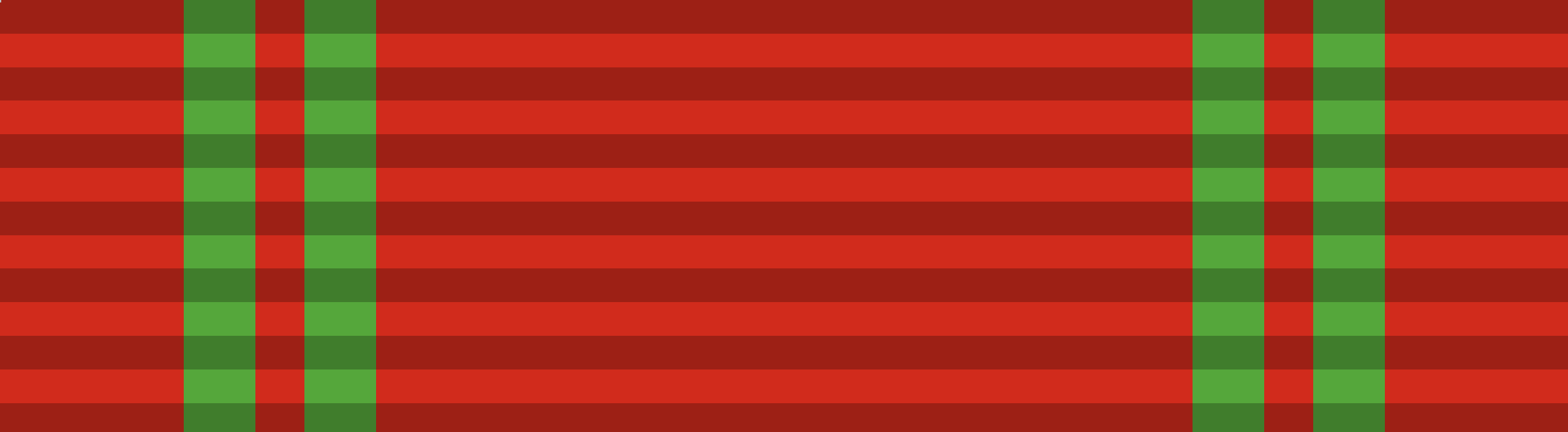
  - Second Class of the Civil Order of Oman (18 November 2024).
