= Vivy Yusof =

Malaysian businesswoman (born 1987)

Yang Berbahagia Datin Vivy Yusof
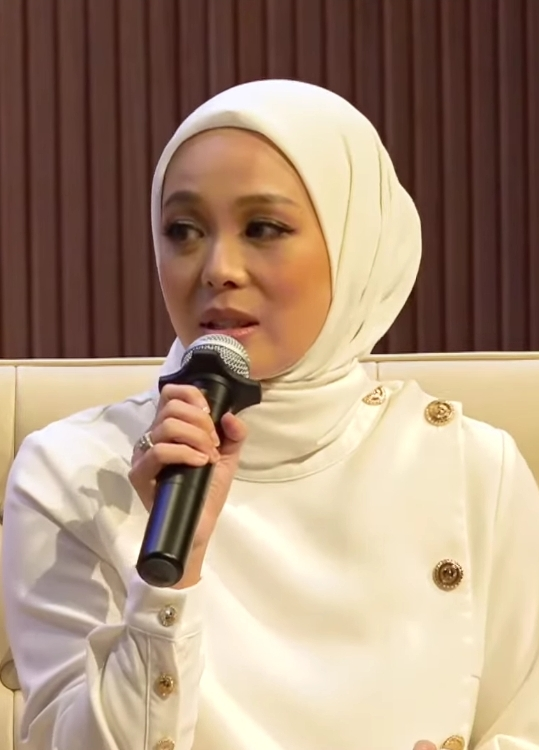
- Vivy in 2022
- Born: Vivy Sofinas binti Yusof; 11 December 1987 (age 38); Kuala Lumpur, Malaysia
- Education: London School of Economics (Law degree)
- Occupation: Businesswoman
- Title: Co-founder of FashionValet and The dUCk Group
- Spouse: Fadzaruddin Shah Anuar (m. 2012)
- Children: 4

Vivy Sofinas binti Yusof (born 11 December 1987) is a Malaysian businesswoman who is the co-founder of FashionValet, a fashion brand she co-founded along with her husband, Fadzarudin Shah Anuar. She is also the co-founder of the dUCk Group, a lifestyle brand. On 5 December 2024, Vivy and her husband were charged with criminal breach of trust of RM 8 million (USD 1,930,000) and they will be tried on April–June 2026.

She has been included in lists such as Forbes' 30 Under 30 Asia. Her work spans entrepreneurship, digital media and fashion.

== Early life and education ==
Vivy is an alumna of London School of Economics with a law degree.

== Career ==
=== Founding of FashionValet ===
Vivy served as the chief creative officer at FashionValet, a fashion e-commerce company she co-founded with her husband, Fadzarudin Shah Anuar, in 2010 at the age of 23. FashionValet has grown to become a significant enterprise with 150 employees and partnerships with over 500 fashion brands. The company operates offices and warehouses in Malaysia, Jakarta, and Singapore, and ships products globally.

In 2017, Vivy expanded her online activity by launching a YouTube channel, where she shares lifestyle content and personal insights. She frequently participates in fashion events across Southeast Asia and is recognized as a fashion commentator and social media influencer. She has also served as a judge for AirAsia's Runway Ready Designer Search for two consecutive years, participating in a panel that seeks emerging fashion designers throughout Southeast Asia.

=== Social media persona ===
Vivy has utilized social media platforms such as Instagram and YouTube to expand her personal brand and connect with a wider audience. Research indicates that her deliberate use of authenticity and emotional storytelling helps create an aspirational yet relatable public image. Through posts that showcase her dual roles as an entrepreneur and a mother, she engages her followers and strengthens the alignment between her personal identity and the values of her businesses, FashionValet and The dUCk Group.

A linguistic analysis of her social media posts identified humblebragging, a strategy blending modesty with self-promotion, as a common feature. The study categorized her humblebrags into complaint-based and humility-based forms, noting that these strategies helped present her achievements while maintaining relatability with her audience. Such practices reflect a broader trend among social media influencers in shaping public perception through curated content.

=== Entrepreneurial impact ===
In 2017, Vivy and her husband were selected to join Endeavor, an international organization that supports high-impact entrepreneurs through mentorship and strategic guidance.

During the COVID-19 pandemic, Vivy and her husband organized three fundraising initiatives to support Malaysian frontliners. Collectively, these efforts raised over RM 2.1 million. They also launched the FV Bazaar, an initiative designed to help food and beverage vendors promote their services during the pandemic. The platform attracted approximately 4,500 vendors.

=== Memoir ===
In December 2022, Vivy published her memoir, The First Decade: My Journey from Blogger to Entrepreneur, through Penguin Random House SEA.

== Television ==
In 2012, Vivy and Fadzarudin attained first place on Make The Pitch, a reality television show where the duo won RM1 million investment by MyEG Services Bhd, for a 30% stake in the company. Vivy later starred in Astro Ria's reality television series, Love, Vivy.

Love, Vivy follows Malaysian fashion entrepreneur Vivy as she balances her professional and personal life, including her roles at online retail platform FashionValet and her scarf brand dUCk, alongside her responsibilities as a daughter, wife, and mother to her four children, Daniel Azim Shah, Mariam Iman Shah, Sarah Ilham Shah, and Idris Ali Shah.

On 21 February 2017, the second season of Love, Vivy was aired on Astro Ria.

== Financial misconducts ==
In October 2024, Vivy was involved in a financial controversy following the disclosure that Khazanah Nasional and Permodalan Nasional Berhad (PNB) had incurred significant losses from their investment in FashionValet, the e-commerce platform she co-founded. Khazanah and PNB, which had invested a combined RM47 million in FashionValet in 2018, sold their stakes in 2023 for RM3.1 million, resulting in a loss of RM43.9 million.

In response to the public criticism following this disclosure, Vivy and her husband, Fadzarudin Shah Anuar, issued a joint statement accepting responsibility for FashionValet's financial difficulties. They acknowledged that their aggressive expansion strategy, particularly during the COVID-19 pandemic, had placed the company under significant financial strain. Vivy further explained that while FashionValet had initially shown promise, the unforeseen challenges of the pandemic severely impacted their ability to maintain operations as planned.

On 5 December 2024, Vivy and her husband were charged at the Kuala Lumpur Sessions Court under Section 409 of the Penal Code for alleged criminal breach of trust involving RM8 million, which was purportedly transferred from FashionValet's bank account to 30 Maple Sdn Bhd without the approval of the company’s board of directors. The alleged offence took place six years earlier. Both pleaded not guilty to the charges, which carry a potential sentence of two to 20 years' imprisonment, whipping, and a fine. The case was scheduled for mention on 22 January 2025. The Judge set the trial dates for April 13 to 17, May 18 to 22, and June 8 to 12, 2026.

== Bibliography ==
- Vivy Yusof (11 December 2022). The First Decade: My Journey from Blogger to Entrepreneur. Penguin Random House. ISBN 9789815058802.

== Awards and accolades ==
Vivy's awards and achievements include:

- Entrepreneur Par Excellence by Malaysia Tatler Ball Awards, 2019
- YouTube Silver Play Button Award, 2019
- Top 40 Under 40 by Prestige Malaysia, 2018
- Generation T by Tatler Malaysia, 2018
- Named “Women Icon of Malaysia” by the Ministry of Women, presented by the Prime Minister of Malaysia, 2018
- Young Global Leaders List by the World Economic Forum, 2018
- Vivy was made a case study in Malaysia's STPM national examination, 2018
- Asia's Top 50 Rising Tech Stars by Tatler Malaysia, 2017
- Generation T by Tatler Malaysia, 2017
- Member of Blue Ocean Corporate Council, an NBOS initiative led by Tan Sri Dato' Sri Abdul Wahid bin Omar, 2017
- Forbes’ 30 Under 30 Asia list, 2017
- Selected as an Endeavor Entrepreneur, 2017
- Amazing Woman 2017 List by Women's Weekly, 2017
- Young Entrepreneur Award at the ASEAN@15 Achievement Awards, 2017
- Anugerah Instafamous Inspirasi, Hurr.TV, 2017
- Social Media Influencer Award, InTrend Malaysia, 2017
- Young Entrepreneur Award recipient, presented by the Queen of Malaysia at Tribute to Women's Award, 2016

Vivy has also appear in covers of several high-profile magazines in Malaysia, including HerWorld, Prestige, and Tatler. She was also named a Friend of Louis Vuitton, becoming the first hijabi woman to be honored with the title.
