= National Life & General =

Insurance company in Oman

National Life & General Insurance Company SAOG
- Company type: Closed joint stock company
- Industry: Insurance
- Founded: 1995; 31 years ago
- Headquarters: Muttrah, Muscat, Oman
- Key people: Khalid Muhammad AlZubair (Chairman); S. Venkatachalam (CEO)
- Products: Life insurance; General insurance
- Parent: Oman International Development and Investment Company SAOG
- Website: www.nlg.om

National Life & General Insurance Company SAOG. (Arabic: الشركة الوطنية للتأمين على الحياة والعام; NLG Oman) is an insurance company in Oman. NLG Oman, part of the Ominvest Group retained its leadership position as the top insurer in Oman in terms of gross written premiums in 2019. The company has a strong network of intermediary brokers and agencies, with around 190+ combined touch point for policy sales and servicing in Oman, UAE and Kuwait. The company offers both life and general insurance products through its brokers, bancassurance partners, online and other channels.

== History ==
The company was established in 1995 and was a subsidiary of Oman National Investment Corp (ONIC). It is the first insurer in Oman. The company came into the fold of Ominvest after the merger between Ominvest and ONIC in 2015.

The company office, called The Opus by Omniyat, is located in the Business Bay area of Dubai, spans an area of 2561 square meters and was completed in July 2020.

== Operations ==
=== Oman ===
The company is a dominant player in Oman's health insurance industry with a market share of over 65% in Oman and provides insurance protection to nearly 200,000 individuals. The company contributed RO 175,000 towards the Endowment Fund for supporting government initiatives to overcome the threat of COVID-19.

=== United Arab Emirates ===
The company is one of the top 5 stand-alone Health Insurance providers in the UAE market. They transacted Gross Written premiums totaling approximately AED 1.4 Billion in the FY 2019.

=== Kuwait ===
The company offers various products in life, general, and corporate insurance and is the market leader in medical insurance.

== Financial strength ==
In May 2020, AM Best affirmed the Financial Strength Rating of B++(Good) and the Long-Term Issuer Credit Rating of “bbb+” of NLGIC, with a stable outlook. It also has ISO 9001:2008 certification from the British Standards Institute (BSI).

== Corporate social responsibility ==
As part of its social responsibility, the company distributed school bags to needy students.

== Awards and recognition ==
The company won the “Best Insurance Company Digital Transformation Oman 2020” award from Global Banking & Finance Review.
