= Raysut Cement =

Omani cement manufacturer

- Type: Public
- Industry: Cement
- Headquarters: Oman
- Products: Cement
- Revenue: OMR 90.98m (2018)
- Net income: OMR 340,000 (2018)
- Website: raysutcement.om

Raysut Cement is an Omani cement manufacturer. It is the largest cement producer in the sultanate. According to Global Cement Directory 2018, the company is the 92nd largest cement producer in the world based on integrated production capacity.

== Financial distress ==
The company reported poor financial performance for 2018 with a 94% drop in profit to $883,000 (OMR340,000).

== Stalled expansion plan ==
The company's CEO Joey Ghose has expressed in 2018 the desire to expand globally through a debt heavy strategy of bank loans. The expansion plans are much greater than the company's current size of business and have faltered in 2019.

In an interview with the Hindu Business Line in December 2018, Ghose claimed to have earmarked $200 million for 2 acquisitions in India that would be completed by the first quarter of 2019. He further promised that the company "will invest another $400-500 million to expand" the 2 acquired Indian companies over the next 4 years. The acquisitions in India as of May 2019 have not been announced.

The company is pursuing a joint venture cement plant with competitor Oman Cement Company. The joint venture Al Wusta Cement is experiencing delays with a January 2019 media report describing the project as "slow to be implemented".

== Accidents ==
In May 2018, a cement carrier of the company, the MV Raysut II, grounded on Fazayah Beach in May 2018, exposing several endangered species of sea turtle that nested at the location to harm. The vessel at the time was carrying 6750t of cement and could not be refloated so it was declared a constructive total loss.
