= Funding Societies =

Singapore digital financing platform

Funding Societies Pte Ltd
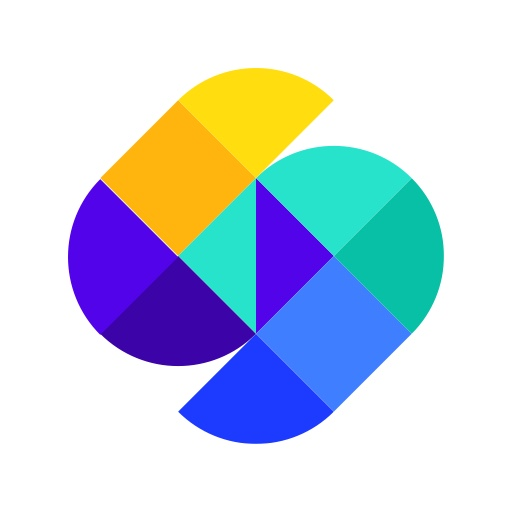
- Type: Private Limited
- Industry: SME Digital Financing, Alternative Investment, Payments
- Founded: February 2015
- Founder: Kelvin Teo, Reynold Wijaya
- Headquarters: Singapore
- Area served: Singapore, Indonesia, Malaysia, Thailand, Vietnam
- Brands: Funding Societies, Modalku
- Number of employees: 500+
- Website: www.fundingsocieties.com

Funding Societies is a Southeast Asian digital financing platform for small and medium-sized enterprises (SMEs), headquartered in Singapore. It was the first such platform in Singapore to engage an escrow agency to independently and safely manage investors’ funds. In Indonesia it is known as Modalku (which means My Capital in the Indonesian language). Since its launch, it has disbursed more than US$2.6 billion in business financing to MSMEs through more than 5.1 million loan transactions.

== History ==
Kelvin Teo and Reynold Wijaya founded Funding Societies in 2015 while studying for their Master of Business Administration (MBA) at Harvard Business School. Funding Societies operates an online platform that enables Small and Medium Business to seek funding for their growth from a pool of investors, through digital lending. The standard loan period ranges from 3 months to 1 year and borrowers can loan up to SGD$2,000,000. In the first month of launching, they received a total of SGD$3 million loan applications of which about SGD$250,000 was disbursed.

In January 2016, Funding Societies launched Modalku, which means "My Capital" in Bahasa Indonesia to reach out to SMEs in the Indonesian Market. In November 2016, Funding Societies Malaysia became one of 6 licensed SME lending platforms in Malaysia recognised and regulated by the Securities Commission.

In 2020, Funding Societies and Razer Fintech jointly announced their partnership to offer short-term business financing to merchants under Razer Merchant Services (RMS).

Funding Societies expanded to Thailand, in February 2021.

=== Series A Funding ===
Funding Societies raised S$10 million in series A funding in August 2016 led by Sequoia India and Alpha JWC Ventures.

=== Series B funding ===
In April 2018, just slightly over three years old, Funding Societies raised US$25 million in their Series B round of funding, led by Softbank Ventures Korea, an early-stage venture capital arm of Softbank Group famous for its US$100 billion Vision Fund. Their existing investors Sequoia India, Alpha JWC Ventures (Indonesia) and Golden Gate Ventures together with new Venture Capitalists Qualgro and LINE Ventures also participated in this round.

== Partnerships ==
Funding Societies has secured the following partnerships:

- DBS Bank in April 2016.

== See also ==
- Comparison of crowdfunding services
