= Dubai Banking Group =

- Type: Subsidiary
- Industry: Diversified Investments
- Founded: 2004
- Headquarters: Dubai, United Arab Emirates
- Key people: Salaam Al-Shaksy, CEO
- Parent: Dubai Group

Dubai Banking Group is the global shari'a compliant financial investor of Dubai Group with assets valued at over USD 10 billion (AED 36.7 billion). The group was established in 2007 when Dubai Islamic Investment Group, founded in 2004, and Dubai Bank, founded in 2002, consolidated their activities to form Dubai Banking Group.

Dubai Banking Group's major investments include:

- 100% ownership of Dubai Bank
- 100% ownership of Dubai Tadawul, a Dubai-based private brokerage company
- 51% stake in Al Fajer Re-Takaful, a closed Kuwaiti shareholding company
- 40% stake in Bank Islam, Malaysia's oldest and largest Islamic bank
- 40% stake in ACR Re-Takaful Holdings Limited, the world's largest reinsurance company
- 33.33% stake in National Bonds UAE, the national Shari'a-compliant saving scheme
- 18.75% stake in BankIslami Pakistan, the first bank to receive an Islamic Banking License in Pakistan

== See also ==
- Dubai Group
