= Sultan Ismail Hospital =

Public hospital in Johor Bahru, Johor, Malaysia

Coordinates: 1°32′46.7″N 103°47′27.6″E

Sultan Ismail Hospital Hospital Sultan Ismail
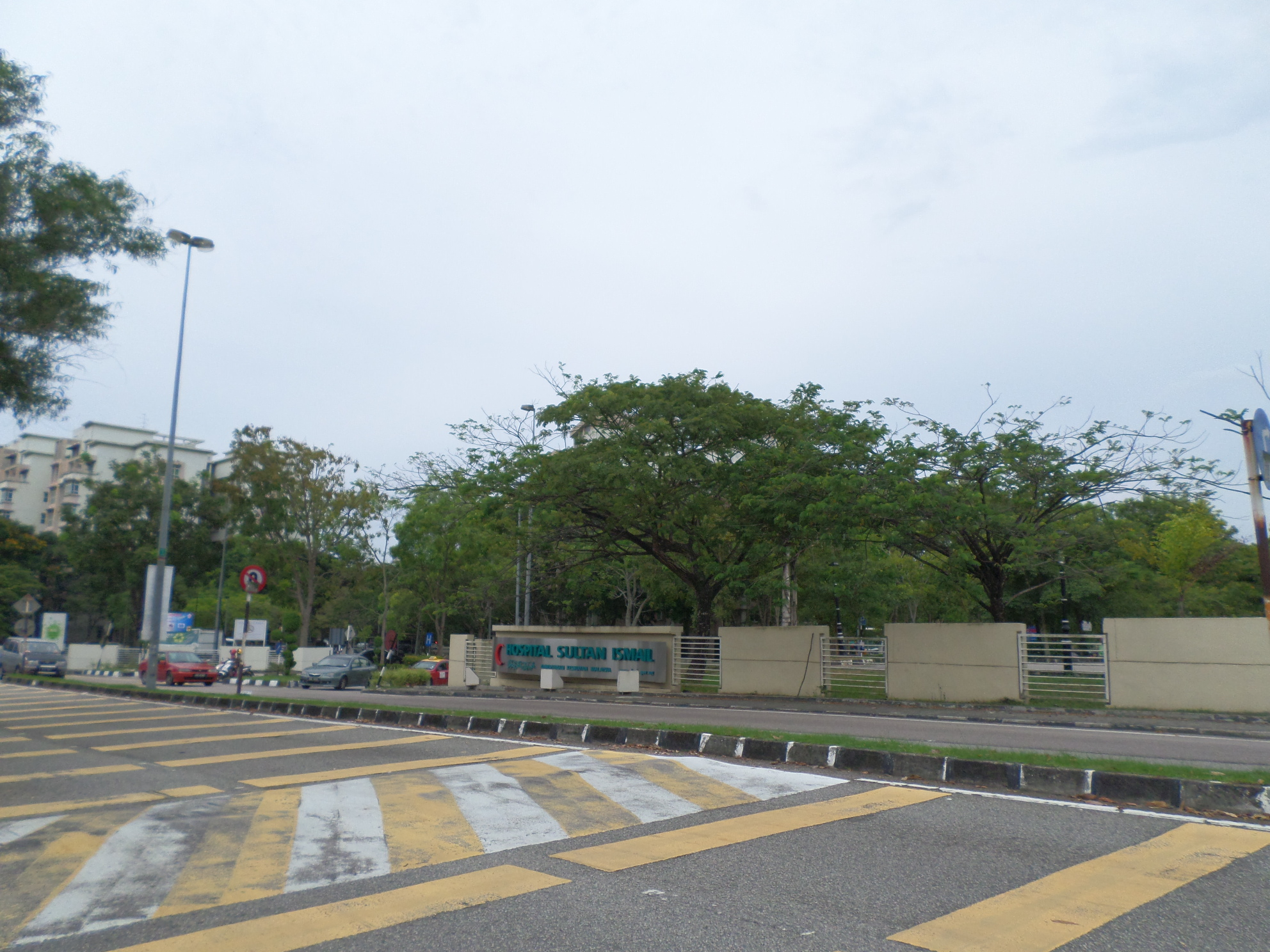

Geography
- Location: Johor Bahru, Johor, Malaysia

Organisation
- Care system: Public
- Type: District General

Services
- Beds: 704

History
- Founded: July 2004

Links
- Website: hsi.moh.gov.my

Sultan Ismail Hospital (Malay: Hospital Sultan Ismail) is a government funded district general hospital in Taman Mount Austin, Johor Bahru, Johor, Malaysia. There is named in honour of Sultan Ismail of Johor.

The hospital was equipped with a computerised system and all administrative work and transactions would go through the system.

== History ==
In July 2004, part of the hospital was opened but it closed down two months later due to the presence of fungal infection detected in the hospital. It was reopened in February 2006, but in April 2007 structural defects were found which involved replacing parts of the roof.

Since 2007, it has been serving the community in a modern facility, equipped to meet the needs of the ageing population.

It is also now utilised by Newcastle University Medicine Malaysia (NUMed Malaysia) as one of their primary teaching hospitals, with NUMeds own team of doctors working alongside the local hospital team.

== Architecture ==
The hospital was constructed with a cost of MYR500 million.

== Transportation ==
The hospital is accessible by Muafakat Bus route P-106 and Shuttle HSI bus.

== See also ==
- List of hospitals in Malaysia
