= Dubai Group =

Dubai Investment Group
- Type: Subsidiary
- Industry: Diversified Investments
- Founded: 2000 as The Investment Office
- Founder: Sheikh Mohammed bin Rashid Al Maktoum
- Headquarters: Dubai, United Arab Emirates
- Key people: Soud Ba'alawy (Chairman); Tom Volpe (CEO)
- AUM: US$60 billion (2014)
- Owner: Dubai Holding
- Number of employees: 18,000 (2014)

Dubai Group (Arabic: مجموعة دبي) is an Emirati investment company based in the United Arab Emirates, and a subsidiary of Dubai Holding. The company was founded in 2000 as the Investment Office, and was renamed Dubai Group in 2005. Through its companies, the group focuses on banking, investments and insurance in the United Arab Emirates and globally.

The group consists of three companies, each with its respective focal point:

- Dubai Investment Group
- Dubai Banking Group
- Noor Investment Group
