= Oman Fisheries =

- Company type: Publicly Traded
- Industry: Fishing industry
- Founded: 1989
- Headquarters: Oman
- Key people: Mohammed Bin Hamad Bin Ali Al Masrouri, Chairman; Saleh Bin Nasser Al Arimi, Vice Chairman; Qais Al Khonji, Member; Abdulamair Bin Said Bin Mohammed Al Lawati, Member; Anwar Bin Ali Sultan, Member
- Number of employees: 550
- Website: Oman Fisheries Website

Oman Fisheries is an Omani-based company in the Sultanate of Oman that harvests, processes and retails fish. It was formed in 1989 and is the largest fishing company in the Sultanate. The company is publicly traded company in Oman with the Ministry of Agriculture and Fisheries having a 24 percent stake in the company. In 2022, Gulf Japan Food Fund (GJFF) invested USD 10 million into Oman Fisheries.

== History ==
In 2011, the company announced that they would be increasing their fishing fleet with the addition of 16 new boats. This would put the number of operating vessels that they own at 20.
