= Oman Oil Marketing Company =

Omani oil and gas marketing company

Oman Oil Marketing Company (omanoil) شركة النفط العمانية للتسويق
- Industry: Petroleum Retail
- Founded: 2003
- Headquarters: Mina Al Fahal, Muscat, Oman
- Number of locations: 229
- Key people: HILAL ALI AL KHARUSI (Chairman); Sayadah Rawan Ahmed Al Saidand (Deputy Chairman); Hussain Jama B Ishaq Ishaqi (A/CEO)
- Owner: Oman Oil Company; Oman Cement Company; BankMuscat; Dhofar International Development & Investment Holding Co
- Website: www.oomco.com

Oman Oil Marketing Company SAOG (OOMCO) is an Omani fuel marketing company based in Muscat.

== History ==
OOMCO was launched in October 2003, along with its new brand identity, when Oman Oil Company acquired shares of what was formally known as BP Oman in December 2003.

In 2018, OOMCO signed deals with the Muscat Municipality and with Hass Petroleum to supply fuel to the cities fleet of vehicles and to distribute lubricants in Kenya and other Eastern African markets.

In 2018, the company also introduced e-payment via an app at their service stations, partnering with Thawani Technologies.

In September 2018, OOMCO announced plans to expand their network of service stations into Saudi Arabia.

== Corporate structure ==
=== Management ===
The chairman of the board of directors is Mulham Al Jarf and vice-chair is Sayadah Rawan Ahmed Al Saidand. The companies operations are led by A/CEO Hussain Jama B Ishaq Ishaqi.

=== Shareholder structure ===
Oman Oil Marketing Companies shares are held by Oman Oil Company (OOC) (49%) and the company is operated under one of OOC's main subsidiaries, the Oman Oil Facilities Development Company (see OOC article for additional details). Other shareholders include Oman Cement Company, BankMuscat and Dhofar International Development and Investment Holding Company.
