= Hisham Hamdan =

Malaysian businessman

Datuk Hisham Hamdan (Jawi: هشام همدان) is the executive director of Khazanah Nasional and also the director and chairman of UDA Holdings Berhad from Malaysia since 2019.

On 28 February 2020, he tested positive for COVID-19, making him the 26th case for Malaysia. He also issued a statement on 6 March 2020, denying the claim that he was the cause of the new clusters in increasing cases in Malaysia.
