= Oman Arab Bank =

Commercial bank in Oman

Oman Arab Bank SAOG
- Company type: Public joint stock company
- Industry: Financial services; Insurance
- Founded: 1 October 1984
- Headquarters: Al-Ghubra, Muscat, Oman
- Services: Retail banking; Corporate banking; Project finance
- Net income: ▲RO92.960 million (2019)
- Total assets: ▲RO2.5 billion (2019)
- Parent: Arab Bank plc (49%)
- Website: www.oman-arabbank.com

Oman Arab Bank (Arabic: بنك عمان العربي) is a commercial bank in Oman, established in 1984. It is jointly owned by Arab Bank plc (49%), Oman International Development and Investment Company SAOG (31.63%) and other individual or corporate shareholders (19.37%).

== History ==
Oman Arab Bank was established in 1984.

In 2014, the bank launched its digital transformation strategy, enhancing its banking channels and services by employing the state-of-the-art technologies, promoting a culture of innovation and talent management, as well as providing added-value services through strategic partnerships. The CEO Abdul Qader Ahmed Askalan resigned in 2013.

Oman Arab Bank has acquired 100% of Alizz Islamic Bank in June 2020 and merged its Al Yusr Islamic Banking window with Alizz Islamic Bank.

On July 6, 2020, Oman Arab Bank was transformed from a closed to a public joint stock company, with its shares listed on the Muscat Securities Market (MSM).

== Activities ==
Oman Arab Bank operates in the retail banking, corporate banking, project finance, investment banking, trade finance and Islamic banking sector.

== See also ==
- List of banks in Oman
