= Central Bank of Oman =

State-owned bank in Oman

Coordinates: 23°36′1″N 58°32′48″E

Central Bank of Oman البنك المركزي العماني
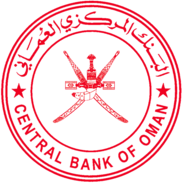

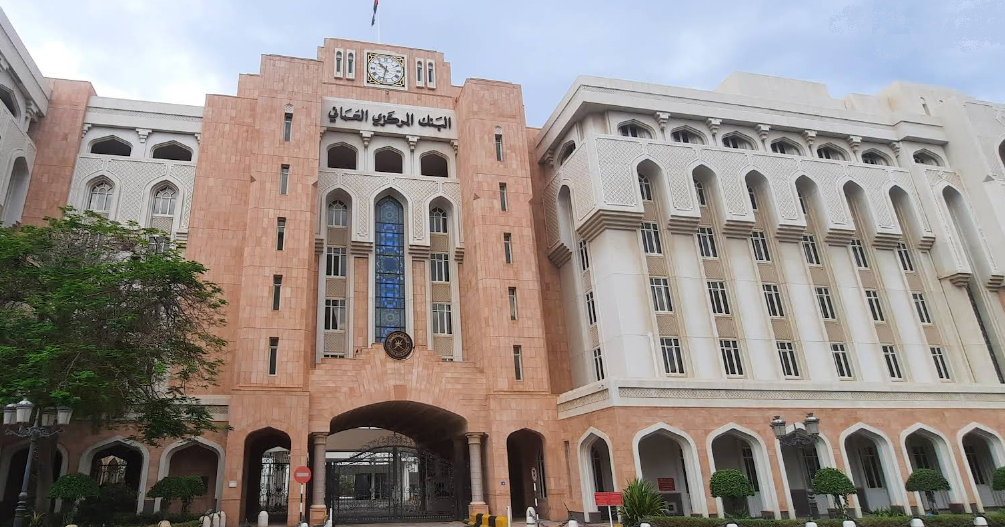
- Central bank of: Oman
- Headquarters: Ruwi, Muscat, Oman
- Established: December 1974 (Legal); 1 April 1975; 51 years ago (Began operations)
- Ownership: 100% state ownership
- Governor: Ahmed bin Jaffer bin Salim Al-Musalmi
- Currency: Omani rial OMR (ISO 4217)
- Reserves: US$17.19 billion
- Website: www.cbo.gov.om

The Central Bank of Oman (CBO; Arabic: البنك المركزي العماني) was established in December 1974 and began operations on 1 April 1975. It replaced the Oman Currency Board as the principal currency authority in Oman. Taimur bin Asa'ad Al Said is the current chairman of the board of directors.

The Central Bank of Oman is responsible for maintaining the stability of the national currency the Omani Rial and ensuring monetary and financial stability in a deregulated and open financial system. The capital base of the CBO which was one million Omani Rials at the commencement of operations in 1975, was strengthened over time and since April 2002 has remained at ر.ع. 300 million. At the end of 2005, CBO's assets/liabilities totalled RO1826.4 million.

In January 2025, the bank underwent significant structural reforms through a series of Royal Decrees. Royal Decree 2/2025 promulgated a new Banking Law, while Royal Decree 3/2025 reorganized the bank's governance structure, granting it legal personality and financial and administrative independence. The reforms replaced the position of Executive President with that of Governor and restructured the Board of Directors. Under these reforms, the bank's headquarters and primary safes must be located in the Governorate of Muscat, with the ability to establish branches, safes, offices, and other facilities within Oman or abroad through Board decisions.

The Omani banking system has experienced several mergers since the 1990s and as a result the number of commercial banks at the end of 2005 stood at 13, of which five are locally incorporated and eight are branches of foreign banks, together having a branch network of 329 branches. Local banks, in addition, have 10 branches and one representative office abroad. As at the end of 2005, there were also three specialised banks in operation, with a network of 26 branches. The CBO has approved the establishment of an additional local bank (Sohar Bank) and a branch of a foreign bank (Bank of Beirut) that are expected to commence operations by the end of 2006. To strengthen the financial position of licensed banks and enable them to face competition as well as finance large projects, the minimum capital requirement for commercial banks was enhanced to RO50 million for local banks and RO10 million for foreign banks. The overall capital adequacy ratio of the commercial banks improved to reach 18.5 percent in 2005.

The Sultanate has made significant progress in implementing the new capital Adequacy criteria laid down in the Basel-II Accord. The adoption of Basel II would transform the current approaches and tools of supervision of the CBO as well as the audit and risk management practices of banks.

The CBO also administers and participates in the financing of a Bank deposit insurance system, which provides the commercial banks with a high level of security for deposits, while cushioning the effects of any unforeseen circumstances. The CBO also has an early warning system for commercial banks that enables it to predict possible financial crises and take preventive action when necessary.

The various monetary policy instruments under the CBO's command could be broadly categorized into indirect measures and direct measures. Indirect policy (market oriented) measures include open market operations involving the buying and selling of securities, issuance of Central Bank's own securities, swaps etc. CD auctions are the main open market type operations conducted by CBO to absorb Omani Rial liquidity and banks can repossess these CDs to acquire liquidity both in the inter-bank market as well as the CBO. Direct monetary policy instruments used by the CBO are mainly in the form of reserve requirements and lending ratios.

The CBO has put in place an efficient and advanced payment and settlement system in Oman. The launch of the Real-time gross settlement (RTGS) was the first milestone and went into live operations on 28 September 2005.

== History ==
Until 1970, when Sultan Qaboos bin Said took over, there was no national authority responsible for the supervision of the incipient banking system. The number of banks was small and the banking activities were limited in scales. The two monetary authorities that preceded the establishment of the Central Bank of Oman, namely the Muscat Currency Authority in 1970 and the Oman Currency Board in 1972, were not vested with full banking status, but, they had well prepared the ground for the emergence of the Central Bank of Oman. However the major event heralding the eminent creation of the Central Bank of Oman was the launching of the Banking Law in 1974 (which was amended vide Royal Decree No. 114/2000).

== Board of Directors ==
The following individuals are members of the Board of Directors of the Central Bank of Oman, as per Royal Decree 4/2025:

- Minister of Economy – Deputy Chair
- Governor of the Central Bank of Oman
- Undersecretary of the Ministry of Finance
- President of the Financial Services Authority
- Sayyida Rawan bint Ahmed bin Thabit Al-Busaidiya
- Dr Said bin Mubarak bin Said Al-Maharrami
- Dr Khalfan bin Mohammed bin Khalid Al-Barwani
- Dr Jamil bin Darwish bin Jamil Al-Shaqsi

== Chairmen of the board ==
- Mahmood Muhammad Murad, of Oman Currency Board, 1972–1974
- Tariq bin Taimur Al Said, of Central Bank of Oman, 1974–1976
- Sultan Qaboos bin Said, 1976 – January 2020
- Sultan Haitham bin Tariq, January 2020 – August 2020
- Taimur bin Asa'ad Al Said, August 2020–present

== Executive Presidents ==
The position of Executive President was abolished in January 2025 and replaced with that of Governor, as per Royal Decree 3/2025.

- Yusuf A. Nimatallah, 1975 – Dec 1978
- Abdul Wahab Khayata, Dec 1978 – June 1991
- Hamood Sangour Al Zadjali, June 1991 – Sept 2017
- Tahir Salim Al Amri, Sept 2017 – Jan 2025

== Governors ==
- Ahmed bin Jaffer bin Salim Al-Musalmi, Jan 2025 –

== See also ==
- Economy of Oman
- List of banks in Oman
- List of central banks
