= Alizz Islamic Bank =

Islamic bank of Oman

- Native name: بنك العزّ الاسلامي
- Type: Public
- Industry: Islamic Banking
- Founded: 2012
- Founder: Taimur bin Asa'ad Al Said
- Headquarters: Muscat, Sultanate of Oman
- Products: Retail banking, corporate banking, finance, credit cards
- Website: http://www.alizzislamic.com

Alizz Islamic Bank (In Arabic: بنك العزّ الاسلامي) is a full-fledged Islamic bank operating in The Sultanate of Oman which launched on the 30 September 2013. Alizz Islamic Bank (SAOC) was established in accordance to Royal Decree No. 69/2012 which amended the banking law to include Islamic banking at licensed banks through either specialized banks or independent entities at the existing commercial banks.

Alizz Islamic Bank provides retail and corporate finance through branches, online and mobile devices. The total paid up capital is 100 million Omani Rials of which 40% was raised by public investors during the initial public offering (IPO). 60% was contributed by the bank's Promoters.

The bank is a closed joint stock company. Yahya Said Al Jabri is chairman of the board of directors while Ali Al Mani is the CEO.
