= Muscat Securities Market =

Stock exchange located in Muscat, Oman

Muscat Stock Exchange
- Type: Stock Exchange
- Location: Muscat, Oman, Sultanate of Oman
- Founded: 2021
- Key people: Ahmed S. Al Marhoon Director General
- Currency: OMR Omani Riyal
- No. of listings: 111 companies (2017)
- Market cap: US$46,586.53 million(2017)
- Volume: 4,275.59 million Securities Traded (includes shares, bonds, and sukuks) / US$2,576.45 million volume (2017)
- Indices: MSM 30
- Website: msx.om

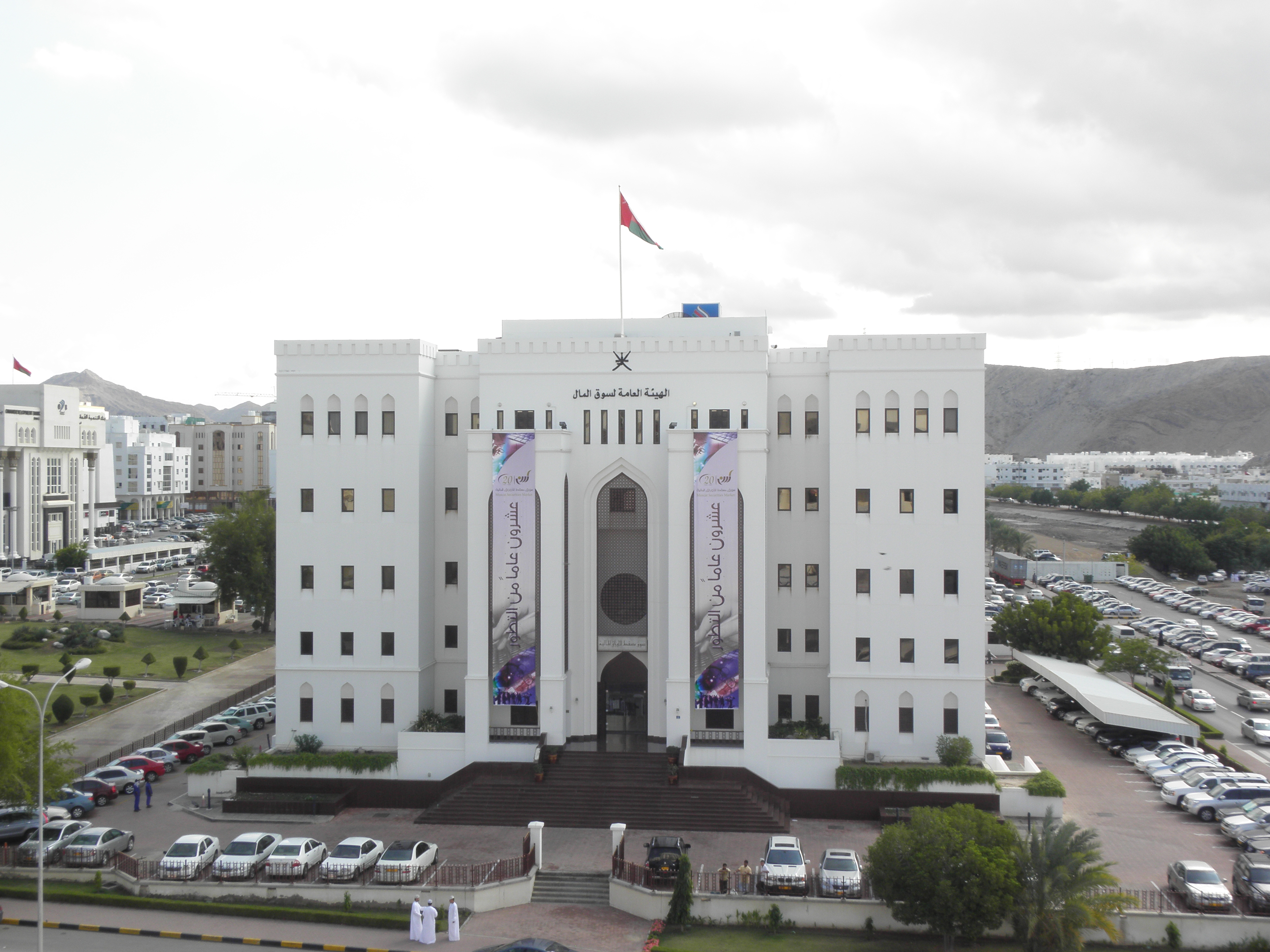
Muscat Securities Market

The Muscat Securities Market (MSM, Arabic: سوق مسقط للأوراق المالية) is the only stock exchange in Oman. It was established by the Royal Decree (53/88) issued on 21 June 1988, to regulate and control the Omani securities market and to participate, effectively, with other organisations for setting up the infrastructure of the Sultanate's financial sector.

After ten years of continuous growth, there was a need for a better functioning of the market. Thus MSM has been restructured by two Royal Decrees (80/98) and (82/98).

== History ==
The Royal Decree (80/98) dated 9 November 1998, which promulgated the new Capital Market Law, provides for the establishment of two separate entities, an exchange, Muscat Securities Market (MSM), where all listed securities shall be traded, and the Capital Market Authority (CMA) – the regulatory. The exchange is a governmental entity, financially and administratively independent from the regulatory but subject to its supervision.

The Market has developed its existing system of clearance and settlement, by introducing a new mechanism for ensuring stable dealings in securities, as well as providing a better environment attracting foreign investment into Oman. The former settlement mechanism was involving only three parties in the clearance and settlement: MSM, Muscat Clearing and Depository Company (S.A.O.C) and the brokers. The newly introduced settlement formula is through a settlement bank (Central Bank) with a Settlement Guarantee Fund (SGF), established with the contribution of all intermediary companies.

The Muscat Securities Market is a member of the Federation of Euro-Asian Stock Exchanges.

== Market classification ==
The regular market has strict listing requirements. For listing on this market, companies must have a solid record of profitability.

There exists also a parallel market with relatively fewer requirements, and is therefore easier for companies to list on, especially the newly established ones. There is a third market consists of companies that are facing financial difficulties.

== Legislative structure ==
From its inception, Muscat Securities Market has issued instructions and regulations as required to ensure that it attains its objectives and performs its duties and responsibilities with the utmost efficiency and fairness, and in conformity with a technical platform of the new electronic trading system, with intensive working on solid infrastructure enabling trading through the Internet.

== MSM-30 index ==
The Muscat Securities Market Index was established in 1999, and the base date was June 1990. The number of companies included in the index sample has changed over time to reach currently 30 companies, the most liquid in the market. It 30 has the following features:

1. Freely available shares for trading are included only. Any shares which fall under the following will be excluded:
  1. Founders (exclusion ends when the company issues two balance sheets for two consecutive financial years);
  2. Government holdings;
  3. Strategic holdings (10% or more);
  4. Locked-in shares, which are not tradable for at least 3 months.
2. A 10% capping (CAP) is set to ensure wider representation of smaller companies in the index.
3. The free float and capping has been revised (re-set) on a quarterly basis. The revision is conducted quarterly, by end of March, June, September and December. The index sample amendment, on the other hand, takes place in the beginning of July of each year. The sample is selected based on the applicable selection criteria (market capitalisation, liquidity, and earnings per share).

The MSM 30 index contains three sub-indices representing the three sectors (Banking & Investment, Industry & Services, and Insurance).

== Technology ==
In the area of information technology, the Market has replaced of the present trading system, which has been operating since 1998, with a more efficient system from Atos Euronext France, which is a very sophisticated system used in many developed markets. The new system ensures provision of the data and information immediately for the supervisory authorities, to enable them activating the regulatory role in trading. The new system broadcasts the trading data immediately to all users and enables the market to add many investment instruments in the future and to make an easy link with the other stock markets in the GCC and other countries.

== Certification ==
ISO 9001:2008

Muscat Securities Market has been awarded the ISO 9001:2008 certification for "Trading of Securities", and the ISO 27001:2005 certification for "Information Security Management System".

== See also ==
- Economy of Oman
- List of Mideast stock exchanges
- List of stock exchanges
