= Bank Muscat =

Financial services company of Oman

- Type: Public
- Industry: Finance and Insurance
- Founded: 1974; 52 years ago
- Headquarters: Muscat, Oman
- Key people: Sheikh Waleed Khamis Al Hashar, CEO
- Products: Financial services
- Revenue: ▲US$ 2.2 billion (2024)
- Net income: ▲US$ 499.5 million (2024)
- Total assets: ▲US$ 36.4billion (2024)
- Number of employees: 3,779
- Website: www.bankmuscat.com

Bank Muscat is a financial services provider in the Sultanate of Oman providing corporate banking, retail banking, investment banking, treasury, private banking and asset management. The bank, with assets worth US$ 31.9 billion in 2018, has the largest network in Oman exceeding 150 branches. As of 2022, the bank has more than 2 million customers, 174 branches, and more than 800 points of interaction, including automated teller machines (ATM), deposit machines (CDM), and full-function machines (FFM).

== Operations ==
The international operations consist of a branch each in Riyadh, Saudi Arabia and Kuwait and representative offices in Dubai, UAE and Singapore. The Bank has whole ownership of Muscat Capital, a brokerage and investment banking entity in Saudi Arabia, and an 11.8% stake in Silkbank in Pakistan.

== Recognition ==
Bank Muscat was voted the ‘Best Bank in Oman’ for seven years by The Banker, FT London nine years in a row by Global Finance and Euromoney. Bank Muscat is the recipient of the Hewitt recognition as the Middle East's Best Employer 2009. The Bank was declared an Investor in People (IiP) organisation in January 2007, becoming the first banking organisation in the MENA region to be awarded the global recognition. In 2004, Bank Muscat became the first bank in the Middle East to be completely ISO 9000:2000 certified. In 2022, the bank was ranked among the top 30 banks in the region by Forbes Middle East.

== International issues ==
In 2013, the bank was hit by a $39 million fraud scheme using prepaid travel cards accessed from outside of Oman. This led to an impairment charge impacting 10.5% of Bank Muscat's earnings for the period.

In 2016, the United States Department of the Treasury secretly issued a license to Bank Muscat to convert $5.7 billion in Iranian overseas reserves from Omani rials into euros via United States dollars, something not normally permitted due to United States sanctions against Iran.
