= Prime Minister of Oman =

Head of government

Prime Minister of the Sultanate of Oman
- رئيس مجلس الوزراء سلطنة عُمان
- National emblem of Oman

- Royal Standard of Oman

- Incumbent; Sultan Haitham bin Tariq Al Said since 10 January 2020
- Chairman of the Council of Ministers
- Style: His Majesty
- Type: Head of government
- Member of: Cabinet of Oman
- Residence: Al Alam Palace
- Seat: Muscat
- Appointer: The Sultan of Oman
- Constituting instrument: Basic Statute of Oman
- Inaugural holder: Tariq bin Taimur
- Formation: 23 July 1970; 56 years ago
- Deputy: Deputy Prime Minister
- Website: www.oman.om

The prime minister of Oman (Arabic: رئيس مجلس الوزراء سلطنة عُمان) is the head of government of the Sultanate of Oman, who chairs the Council of Ministers. Since 1972, the office has been held by the reigning sultan, who serves simultaneously as both head of state and head of government, as outlined in the Basic Statute.

The first prime minister, Sayyid Tariq bin Taimur, the father of Sultan Haitham bin Tariq, took office in 1970 following the accession of Sultan Qaboos bin Said. He served until 1972, after which Sultan Qaboos bin Said assumed the position. Under the Basic Statute of Oman, the sultan also serves as Prime Minister.

The prime minister chairs the Council of Ministers, the chief executive body of the Sultanate, and is responsible for coordinating national policy, supervising the implementation of laws, and directing the work of the various ministries.

== List of officeholders (1970–present) ==
No.	Portrait	Name (Lifespan)	Term of office			Head of state	Deputy
No.	Portrait	Name (Lifespan)	Took office	Left office	Time in office	Head of state	Deputy
1		Tariq bin Taimur Al Said طارق بن تيمور آل سعيد (1921–1980)	1970	2 January 1972	2 years	Qaboos bin Said (1940–2020)	None
2		Qaboos bin Said Al Said قابوس بن سعيد آل سعيد (1940–2020)	2 January 1972	10 January 2020 (Died in office)	48 years, 273 days		Fahr bin Taimur (1976–1973); Fahd bin Mahmoud al Said (1979–2020); Qais Bin Abdul Munim Al Zawawi (1982–1995); Thuwaini bin Shihab Al Said (1984–2010); Asa'ad bin Tariq (2017–2020)
3		Haitham bin Tariq Al Said هَيْثَم بْن طَارِق آل سَعِيد (born 1955)	10 January 2020	Incumbent	6 years, 289 days		Fahd bin Mahmoud al Said (2020–2026); Asa'ad bin Tariq (2020–present); Shihab bin Tariq (2020–present); Theyazin bin Haitham Al Said (2026–present)

== See also ==
- Politics of Oman
