= Tariq bin Taimur =

Prime Minister of Oman from 1970 to 1972

Tariq bin Taimur Al Said: طارق بن تيمور آل سعيد
- Tariq in 1971

1st Prime Minister of Oman
- In office: 1970–1972
- Predecessor: position created
- Successor: Qaboos bin Said
- Born: 30 June 1921; Constantinople, Ottoman Empire
- Died: 28 December 1980 (aged 59); London, United Kingdom
- Spouse: Shawana bint Hamud bin Ahmad Al Busaidiyah; Shawana bint Nasir Al Said
- Issue: Talal bin Tariq; Qais bin Tariq; Asa'ad bin Tariq; Haitham bin Tariq; Shihab bin Tariq; Adham bin Tariq; Faris bin Tariq; Amal bint Tariq; Nawwal bint Tariq
Names
- Tariq bin Taimur bin Faisal bin Turki Al Said
- Dynasty: Al Bu Said
- Father: Taimur bin Feisal
- Mother: Kamile İlgiray
- Religion: Ibadi Islam

Sayyid Tariq bin Taimur Al Said (Arabic: طارق بن تيمور آل بو سعيد; 30 June 1921 – 28 December 1980) was a member of the Omani royal family and the first prime minister of Oman. Tariq was the son of Sultan Taimur bin Feisal (r. 1913–1932), brother of Sultan Said bin Taimur (r. 1932–1970), uncle of Sultan Qaboos bin Said (r. 1970–2020), and father of Sultan Haitham bin Tariq (r. since 2020).

== Early life ==
Tariq was the son of Sultan Taimur bin Feisal and his third wife, Kamile İlgiray, a Circassian woman. Tariq had four brothers, Said, Majid, Fahr and Shabib, and one sister, Buthaina.

== Marriages and children ==
Tariq married three times and had a total of nine children.

He married firstly to Sayyida Shawana bint Hamud bin Ahmad Al Busaidiyah and had six children.

- Sayyida Amal bint Tariq (born 18 November 1950)
- Sayyid Qais bin Tariq (born 20 January 1952) married Susan Schafer
- Sultan Haitham bin Tariq (born 13 October 1954) married Sayyida Ahad bint Abdullah bin Hamad Al Busaidiyah in 1989
- Sayyid Shihab bin Tariq (born 5 March 1956) married Sayyida Rawdah bint Abdullah bin Hamad Al Busaidiyah
- Sayyid Adham bin Tariq (born 5 March 1959)
- Sayyid Faris bin Tariq (born 5 March 1961)

His second marriage was to Sayyida Shawana bint Nasir Al Busaidiyah and they had three children.

- Sayyid Talal bin Tariq (born 27 July 1947)
- Sayyida Nawwal (Kamila) bint Tariq (born 20 November 1951) married Sultan Qaboos bin Said in 1976 and divorced in 1979
- Sayyid Asa'ad bin Tariq (born 20 June 1954) married Sayyida Na'emah bint Badr Al Busaidiyah in 1978

His third wife, Helen, was a German national, and the couple had no children together.

Three of Tariq's sons were likely candidates to succeed Sultan Qaboos. Asa'ad bin Tariq became Deputy Prime Minister for Relations and International Cooperation Affairs as well as representative to the Sultan. Shihab was a commander in the Royal Navy of Oman. Haitham served as Minister of Heritage and Culture. After Sultan Qaboos died on 11 January 2020, Haitham was named as his successor.

== Career ==
Tariq was a critic of the rule of his brother, Sultan Said bin Taimur, and in 1958 he was forced into exile. He settled in West Germany and worked as the representative of a construction firm in the Middle East.

In 1970, Tariq's brother was overthrown by his son, Sultan Qaboos bin Said. Tariq's nephew Qaboos brought him back from exile and appointed him as the first prime minister of the Cabinet of Oman. Tariq held the position for two years until 1972. He was also the chairman of Central Bank of Oman from 1975 to 1976.
