= Buthaina bint Taimur =

Omani royal

Buthaina bint Taimur Al Said: بثينة بنت تيمور آل سعيد
- Born: 10 October 1937 (age 89); Kobe, Japan
Names
- Buthaina bint Taimur bin Faisal bin Turki Al Said
- Japanese: 節子 (Setsuko)
- House: Al Bu Sa'id
- Father: Taimur bin Feisal
- Mother: Kiyoko Oyama
- Religion: Ibadi Islam

Sayyida Buthaina bint Taimur Al Said (Arabic: بثينة بنت تيمور آل سعيد; born 10 October 1937) is a member of the Omani royal family. She is the daughter of Sultan Taimur bin Faisal and Kiyoko Oyama, the half-sister of Sultan Said bin Taimur, and the paternal aunt of Sultan Qaboos bin Said and Sultan Haitham bin Tariq.

== Early life in Japan ==
Sayyida Buthaina, also known as Setsuko (節子), was born on 10 October 1937 in Kobe, Japan to Sultan Taimur bin Feisal and his fifth wife, Kiyoko Oyama. She has five half-brothers from her father's other marriages: Sultan Said bin Taimur, Sayyid Majid bin Taimur, Sayyid Tariq bin Taimur, Sayyid Fahr bin Taimur, and Sayyid Shabib bin Taimur.

In 1935, Sultan Taimur, then 47, met a Kiyoko Oyama (Japanese: 大山清子), then 19, at a dance hall in Kobe. He had heard stories about Japan from Shiga Shigetaka when he was in Oman in 1924 and after Taimur abdicated the throne in 1932 he decided to visit the country.

Sultan Taimur returned to Japan the next year and married Kiyoko Oyama on 5 May 1936 at Akashi. He went back to Oman briefly to close his household there and returned to Japan on 18 September 1936. The couple lived in a mansion in Kobe's Fukiai-ku ward.

Kiyoko contracted tuberculosis and was in and out of the hospital until her death in November 1939. Taimur had sent Buthaina to live with her maternal relatives so she would not catch the disease while he lived in Bombay, India. He returned in May 1940 to bury his wife at Inami and then left Japan for the last time taking Buthaina with him.

== Later life in Oman ==
After briefly staying in Karachi, Sultan Taimur brought Buthaina to Oman where she was placed under the care of his first wife, Sayyida Fatima bint Ali Al Said. Sultan Taimur continued to live in Bombay and only saw his daughter once more in 1945 when he visited Oman before his death in 1965.

In 1978, Buthaina, accompanied by Sayyid Tariq bin Taimur, visited Japan so that she could visit her mother's grave. She also met with her maternal relatives and visited her previous home. It was noted at the time that she no longer could speak Japanese.

Sayyida Buthaina bint Taimur now lives in Muscat. She is married and has a son that works for Oman Air.

== Media depictions ==
Buthaina and her mother, Kiyoko Oyama, have been the subject of two Fuji TV specials in Japan: an episode of Unbelievable in 2016 and an episode of The Nonfiction in 2018.

== Title and style ==
- 10 October 1937 - present: Her Highness Sayyida Buthaina bint Taimur Al Said
