= Politics of Oman =

The Politics of Oman take place in the context of a unitary absolute monarchy, where the Sultan of Oman is both head of state and head of government. The Sultan is hereditary, who appoints a cabinet to assist him. The sultan also serves as the supreme commander of the armed forces and prime minister.

== Monarchy ==
The Sultan is a direct descendant of Ahmad bin Said al-Busaidi, the founder of the Al Said dynasty. The Sultanate has neither political parties nor legislature, although the bicameral representative bodies provide the government with advice. After the late Sultan Qaboos bin Said al-Said died leaving no direct heir, his successor Haitham bin Tariq chose to create the position of Crown Prince of Oman in 2021 and move to a defined line of succession rather than leaving it up to a family vote.

The current sultan is Haitham bin Tariq, who was appointed on 11 January 2020 following the death of his cousin Sultan Qaboos bin Said al-Said.

== Judicial system ==
The court system in Oman is regulated by Royal Decree 90/99. There are three court levels in Oman, the Elementary Court is the lowest court, followed by the Court of Appeal, and then the Supreme Court as the highest court in the country.

In addition to this there is an Administrative Court that looks into cases made against the government.

== Administrative divisions ==
Administratively, the populated regions are divided into 11 regions (Governorates), presided over by governors appointed by the Sultan and therefore represent the Government in administering the region and head the local Municipal Council which include the heads of regional administrative departments as well as elected members from the public. Each Governorate is sub-divided into townships (Wilayats) and each Wilayat is presided over by a Wali who reports to the Governor and their responsibilities include maintaining public order within the geographical boundaries of the wilaya, working to resolve tribal disputes and conflicts, organizing and supervising the electoral process for members of the Consultative Assembly and municipal councils as well as chairing local and developmental committees in the wilaya. The Governors of Muscat, Dhofar and Musandam are an important government figures, holding cabinet rank, while other Governors operate under the guidance of the Ministry of Interior.

== Council of Oman ==
The Omani legislature is the bicameral Council of Oman, consisting of an upper chamber, the Council of State (Majlis ad-Dawlah) and a lower chamber, the Consultative Assembly (Majlis al-Shura).

In November 1991, Sultan Qaboos replaced the 10-year-old State Consultative Council with the Consultative Assembly (Majlis al-Shura) to systematize and broaden public participation in government. The Assembly has 94 elected members and exercises some legislative powers. The Consultative Assembly consists of elected members representing all the wilayas of the Sultanate. The members are determined so that each wilaya is represented by one member if its population does not exceed thirty thousand at the time of the opening of nominations, and by two members if the population exceeds this limit at the same time.

The election of the Consultative Assembly members is conducted through general, secret, and direct voting as specified by the election law. A higher committee, which is independent and impartial and chaired by one of the Deputy Chief Justices of the Supreme Court, oversees the elections and adjudicates electoral appeals.

The Consultative Assembly serves as a conduit of information between the people and the government ministries. It is empowered to review drafts of economic and social legislation prepared by service ministries, such as communications and housing, and provide recommendations. Service ministers also may be summoned before the Majlis to respond to representatives' questions. It has no authority in the areas of foreign affairs, defense and security.

The Council of State (Majlis A’Dawla) was established after the issuance of the Royal Decree No. 86/97 on the establishment of the Council of Oman. It enjoys a legal personality and financial and administrative independence. It is composed of a number of members not exceeding the number of members of the Consultative Assembly. The Members of the Council of State are appointed by a royal decree. Among the responsibilities of the Council of State are proposing draft laws, approving or amending of the draft laws referred by the Consultative Assembly and submitting them to the Sultan for promulgation, along with reviewing draft development plans and the annual budget of the state referred by the Consultative Assembly, making recommendations on them and sending them back to the Council of Ministers.

== Political elections and issues ==
Oman does not allow political parties and only holds elections with expanding suffrage for the Consultative Assembly and the local Municipal councils. The previously influential opposition movement, the Popular Front for the Liberation of Oman, is dormant today. The last elections was the 2023 Omani general election.

A 2025 opinion poll found among Omanis low satisfaction with the availability of job opportunities.

=== International organization participation ===
Oman participates in ABEDA, AFESD, AL, AMF, ESCWA, FAO, G-77, GCC, IAEA, IBRD, ICAO, IDA, IDB, IFAD, IFC, IHO, ILO, IMF, IMO, Inmarsat, Intelsat, Interpol, IOC, ISO (correspondent), ITU, NAM, OIC, OPCW, United Nations, UNCTAD, UNESCO, UNIDO, UPU, WFTU, WHO, WIPO, WMO, WTrO.
