= Order of Establishment =

Order of Oman

Order of Establishment وسام الرسوخ

Awarded by Sultan of Oman
- Type: State
- Established: 2010
- Country: Oman
- Royal house: Al Bu Sa'id
- Status: Currently constituted
- Founder: Sultan Qaboos bin Said
- Sovereign: Sultan Haitham bin Tariq
- Classes: 1st to 3rd Class

Precedence
- Next (higher): Order of Oman
- Next (lower): Order of Sultan Qaboos
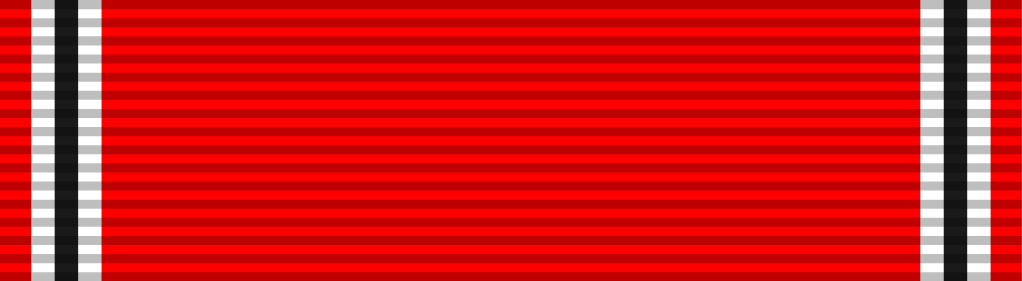
- Ribbon bar of the order

The Order of Establishment (Note: It can also be translated as steadfastness of firmness.) (Arabic: وسام الرسوخ, romanized: Wisam Al-Russoukh) is the third highest order of Oman.

== History ==
Sultan Qaboos bin Said created the order in 2010 on the 40th anniversary of his ascension to the throne. There are three classes and it is awarded to high ranking government officials.

== Insignia ==
The insignia includes a neck ribbon with badge and breast star. The ribbon is red with narrow black stripes surrounded by white stripes near each edge. The badge and star are of the same design. The center is red enamel with a gold crown of Oman surround by alternating circles of red enamel and diamonds. The outside is eight flame motifs in red enamel connected by arabesques of diamonds.

== Notable recipients ==
=== First class ===
- Sultan Haitham bin Tariq Al Said (23 November 2010)
- Sayyid Asa'ad bin Tariq Al Said (23 November 2010)
- Sayyid Shihab bin Tariq Al Said (23 November 2010)
- Sayyid Fahd bin Mahmoud Al Said (23 November 2010)
- General Ali bin Majid Al Ma'amari (23 November 2010)
- Sayyid Ali bin Hamoud Al Busaidi (23 November 2010)
- Mohammed bin Al Zubair (23 November 2010)
- Dr. Omar bin Abdul Munim Al Zawawi (23 November 2010)
- Ali bin Mohammed bin Moosa (23 November 2010)
- Maqbool bin Ali Sultan (23 November 2010)
- Sheikh Abdullah bin Mohammed Al Salmi (23 November 2010)

=== Second class ===
- Sayyid Shabib bin Taimur Al Said (23 November 2010)
