= Cabinet of Oman =

Chief executive body of the Sultanate of Oman

Cabinet of the Sultanate of Oman
- مجلس الوزراء
- Formation: 23 July 1970 (56 years ago)
- Headquarters: Muscat, Oman
- Prime Minister: Haitham bin Tariq Al Said
- Membership: 1 prime minister; 3 deputy prime ministers; 21 general ministers

The Cabinet of Oman, officially the Council of Ministers (Arabic: مجلس الوزراء), is the chief executive body of the Sultanate of Oman. The cabinet consists of federal government ministers and is led by Sultan Haitham bin Tariq in his role as prime minister.

== Cabinet ==
Sultan Haitham bin Tariq on 12/01/2026 issued Royal Decree 17/2026 reconstituting the Council of Ministers:

Portrait	Incumbent	Office	Website	Since
	Shihab bin Tariq	Deputy Prime Minister for Defense Affairs	www.mod.gov.om	2020
	Theyazin bin Haitham	Deputy Prime Minister for Economic Affairs		2026
	Asa'ad bin Tariq	Deputy Prime Minister for Relations and International Cooperation Affairs	www.mod.gov.om	2017
	Bilarab bin Haitham	Minister of State and Governor of Muscat		2026
	Khalid bin Hilal Al Busaidi	Minister of Diwan of Royal Court	www.rca.gov.om	2011
	Sultan bin Mohammed al Nu'amani	Minister of Royal Office		2011
	Hamoud bin Faisal al Busaidi	Minister of Interior	www.moi.gov.om	2011
	Badr bin Hamad Al Busaidi	Minister of Foreign Affairs	www.fm.gov.om	2020
	Sultan bin Salem al-Habsi	Minister of Finance	www.mof.gov.om	2020
	Madeeha bint Ahmed bin Nassir al Shibaniyah	Minister of Education	home.moe.gov.om	2011
	Saud bin Hilal Al Busaidi	Minister of Culture, Sports and Youth	mcsy.om	2026
	Abdullah bin Mohammed Al Saidi	Minister of Justice and Legal Affairs	www.mjla.gov.om//	2011
	Abdullah Nasser bin Khalifa al-Harrasi	Minister of Information	omaninfo.om//	2020
	Khamis bin Saif bin Hamoud al Jabri	Minister of Economy	economy.gov.om//	2026
	Ibrahim bin Said bin Ibrahim Al Busaidi	Minister of Heritage and Tourism	mht.gov.om//	2026
	Saud bin Hamoud bin Ahmed Al Habsi	Minister of Agricultural, Fisheries wealth and Water Resources	www.maf.gov.om	2020
	Khalfan bin Saeed bin Mubarak al-Shueili	Minister of Housing and Urban Planning	www.housing.gov.om	2020
	Saeed bin Hamoud bin Saeed al Maawali	Minister of Transport, Communications and Information Technology	mtcit.gov.om	2020
	Laila bint Ahmed bin Awad al Najjar	Minister of Social Development	www.mosd.gov.om	2020
	Mahad bin Said bin Ali Baawain	Minister of Labour	www.mol.gov.om	2020
	Salim bin Nasser bin Said Al Aufi	Minister of Energy and Minerals	mem.gov.om/en-us/	2022
	Mohammed bin Said bin Khalfan Al Mamari	Minister of Awqaf and Religious Affairs	www.mara.gov.om	2022
	Hilal bin Ali bin Hilal Al-Sabti	Minister of Health	www.moh.gov.om	2022
	Anwar bin Hilal bin Hamdoun Al Jabri	Minister of Commerce, Industry and Investment Promotion	www.tejarah.gov.om	2026
