= Thuwaini bin Shihab Al Said =

His Highness Sayyid Thuwaini bin Shihab Al Said

Deputy Prime Minister of Oman
- In office 1984 or before – 26 June 2010
- Monarch: Sultan Qaboos
- Prime Minister: Sultan Qaboos

Personal details
- Born: 1924
- Died: 26 June 2010 (aged 85–86)
- Parent: Shihab bin Faisal Al Said (father)

Sayyid Thuwaini bin Shihab Al Said was an Omani senior member of the royal family and one of the Deputy Prime Ministers.

Thuwaini was born in 1924. He was educated in Baghdad and in Bahrain. He worked in the office of Sultan Said bin Taimur from 1948 to 1955. He worked in the office of his father Sayyid Shihab bin Faisal, Governor of Muscat, from 1956 to 1970. He succeeded him as the Governor of Muscat in 1970. He held the position of the governor until 1984.

In October 1970 Thuwaini was appointed as a personal advisor to the Sultan Qaboos. He was one of the Deputy Prime Ministers at least since 1984. Since 1985 he was the personal representative of the Sultan.

Thuwaini was a son of Shihab bin Faisal Al Said, who was a son of Sultan Faisal bin Turki. He was Sultan Qaboos' cousin, and was one of the most likely candidates to succeed him as Sultan. However, he died on 26 June 2010.
