= Fahd bin Mahmoud al Said =

Omani politician (1940–2026)

Sayyid Fahd bin Mahmoud al Said
- فهد بن محمود السعيد
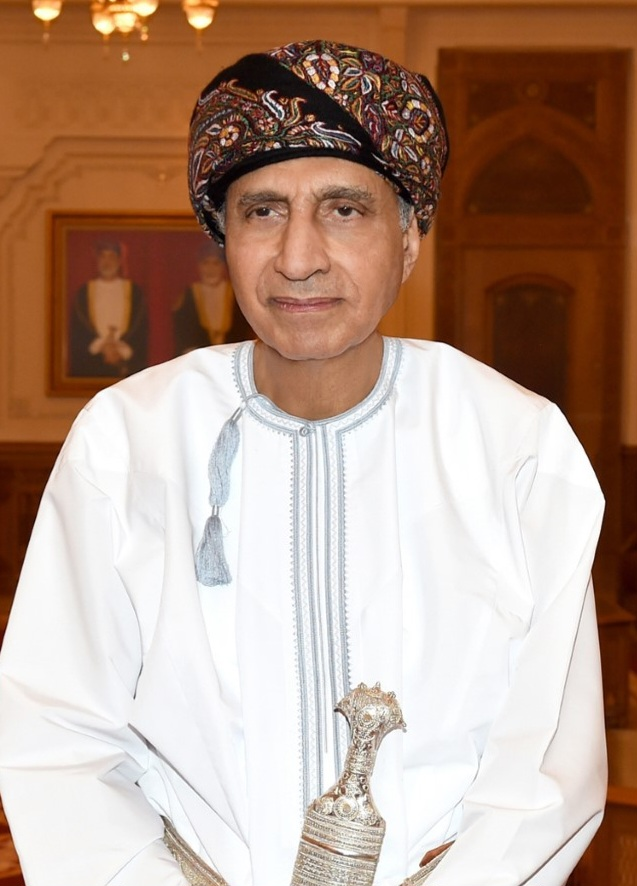
- Al Said in 2020

Deputy Prime Minister for the Council of Ministers
- In office 22 May 1979 – 12 March 2026
- Monarchs: Qaboos bin Said; Haitham bin Tariq
- Prime Minister: Qaboos bin Said; Haitham bin Tariq
- Preceded by: Office established
- Succeeded by: Shihab bin Tariq Al Said

Deputy Prime Minister for Legal Affairs
- In office 1979–1994
- Monarch: Qaboos bin Said
- Prime Minister: Qaboos bin Said
- Preceded by: Office established
- Succeeded by: Mohammed bin Ali bin Nasser Al Alawi

Minister of Information and Culture
- In office 1973–1979
- Monarch: Qaboos bin Said
- Prime Minister: Qaboos bin Said
- Preceded by: Abdullah bin Mohammed Al Taie
- Succeeded by: Abdul Aziz bin Mohammed Al Rowas

Minister Responsible for Foreign Affairs
- In office 1971–1973
- Preceded by: Office established
- Succeeded by: Qais Bin Abdul Munim Al Zawawi

Personal details
- Born: 5 October 1940 Muscat and Oman
- Died: 12 March 2026 (aged 85)

Sayyid Fahd bin Mahmoud al Said (Arabic: فهد بن محمود السعيد; 5 October 1940 – 12 March 2026) was a member of the Omani royal family and a politician who served as the Deputy Prime Minister for the Council of Ministers from 1979 until his death in 2026.

== Life and career ==
Al Said was born on 5 October 1940. He held a degree in commerce from University of Cairo. He was appointed director of ministry of foreign affairs in 1971, appointed Minister of State for Foreign Affairs in November 1971 and Minister of Information and Culture in December 1972. He was also the spokesperson of the Royal Family Council upon the death of Sultan Qaboos bin Said.

== Personal life ==
He was married to a French woman. They had a son and three daughters, Kamel bin Fahd, Mona bint Fahd, Nadia bint Fahd and Lubna bint Fahd. Al Said died on 12 March 2026, at the age of 85.

== Awards ==
Oman:

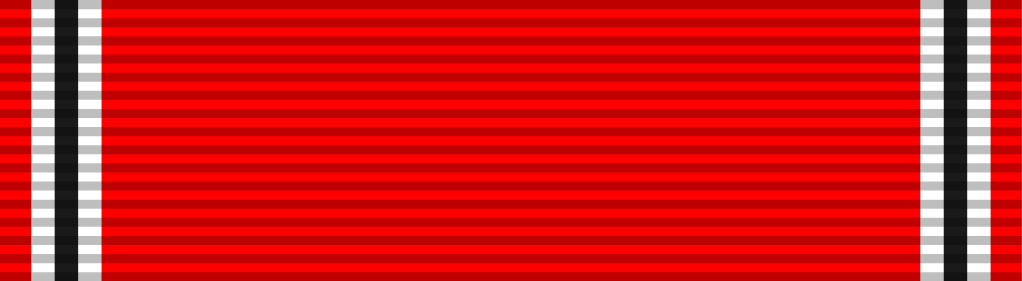
- Member 1st Class of the Order of Establishment (23 November 2010)

Bahrain:

- Voluntary Work Award Presented by Sheikh Isa ibn Ali Al Khalifa (20 September 2016)
