= Taimur bin Feisal =

Taimur bin Faisal
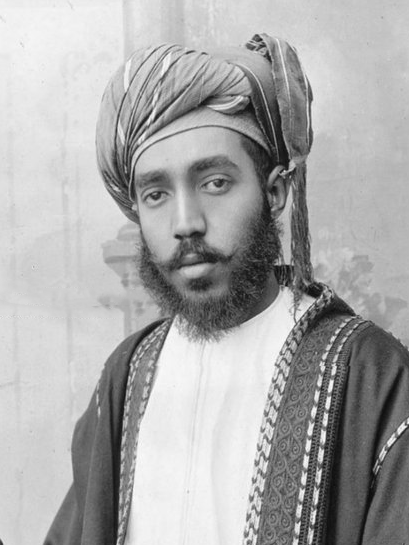
- Formal portrait, before 1932

Sultan of Oman
- Reign: 5 October 1913 – 10 February 1932
- Predecessor: Faisal bin Turki
- Successor: Said bin Taimur
- Born: 1886; Muscat, Oman
- Died: 28 January 1965 (aged 78–79); Bombay, India
- Spouse: 6 wives
- Issue: Said bin Taimur; Majid bin Taimur; Tariq bin Taimur; Fahr bin Taimur; Shabib bin Taimur; Buthania bint Taimur
Names
- Taimur bin Faisal bin Turki bin Said Al Said
- Dynasty: Al Bu Said
- Father: Faisal bin Turki
- Mother: Aliyah bint Thuwaini
- Religion: Ibadi Islam
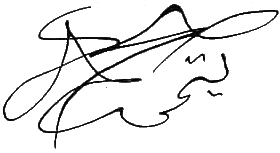
- Signature

Sultan Taimur bin Faisal bin Turki Al Said (Arabic: تيمور بن فيصل بن تركي; 1886 – 28 January 1965) was the Sultan of Muscat and Oman from 5 October 1913 to 10 February 1932.

== Early life ==
Taimur was born in 1886 to Sultan Faisal bin Turki Al Said and his first wife, Sayyida Aliyah bint Thuwaini Al Said. His mother was the daughter of Sultan Thuwaini bin Said Al Said.

== Marriages and children ==
Taimur was married six times and had six children.

Sayyida Fatima bint Ali bin Salim bin Thuwaini Al Said, married 1902:

- Sultan Said bin Taimur Al Said

A Yemeni woman:

- Sayyid Majid bin Taimur Al Said (born 1919)

Kamile İlgiray, a Circassian woman, married 1920 and divorced 1921:

- Sayyid Tariq bin Taimur Al Said (born 30 June 1921)

A Dhofari woman:

- Sayyid Fahr bin Taimur Al Said (born 1924)

Kiyoko Oyama, a Japanese woman, married 1936:

- Sayyida Buthaina bint Taimur Al Said (born 10 October 1937)

Nafisa Bundukji, a daughter of Khan Bahadur Sadik Hasan, married 1939 and divorced 1940:

- Sayyid Shabib bin Taimur Al Said (born 1940)

He is the grandfather of Sultan Qaboos bin Said Al Said and Sultan Haitham bin Tariq Al Said.

== Sultan of Muscat and Oman ==
He succeeded his father Faisal bin Turki, Sultan of Muscat and Oman as sultan on 5 October 1913.

When he assumed suzerainty over the country, he inherited an external public debt and widespread rebellion among the tribes. Between 1915 and 1920, the sultan's forces were aided by British financial and materiel support against the rebel tribes, ensuring adequate resistance but not total victory. An uneasy situation of no war, no peace, existed, with the sultan controlling Muscat and the coastal towns (the former Sultanate of Muscat) and the imam ruling the interior (Oman proper). This was tacitly codified in the Treaty of As Sib in 1920, brokered by the British political agent in Muscat. The treaty was between the sultan and the tribes, represented by Shaikh Isa ibn Salih al Harthi, leader of the Hinawi faction and of the Al-Harthi tribe. The treaty was signed on 25 September 1920; it capped duties on goods moving from the interior to Muscat, Matrah, Sur and other coastal towns at 5 per cent.

In return for full autonomy, the tribes in the interior pledged to cease attacking the coast. The Treaty of As Sib was a de facto partition agreement between Muscat and Oman, serving Britain's interest in preserving its power through the office of the sultan without dispatching British troops to the region. The Treaty of As Sib ensured political quiescence between Muscat and Oman that lasted until the 1950s, when oil exploration in the interior reintroduced conflict. In return for accepting a truncation of his authority, the sultan received a loan from the government of British India with an amortization period of ten years, sufficient to repay his debts to merchants. When Sultan Taimur ibn Faisal abdicated for financial reasons in 1932, the twenty-two-year-old Said ibn Taimur inherited an administration that was in debt.

A United States Department of State bulletin on the sultan of Muscat and Oman in February 1938 describes the situation in which Sultan Said ibn Taimur found himself after assuming power: "The young Sultan found the country practically bankrupt and his troubles were further complicated by tribal unrest and conspiracy by certain of his uncles, one of whom immediately profited by the occasion to set up an independent regime. The Sultan tackled the situation with resolution and within a short time the traitorous uncle had been subdued, unrest quelled, and most important of all, state finances put on much more solid footing."

== Abdication ==
In 1932 he abdicated in favor of his eldest son Said bin Taimur and lived abroad, mostly in British India. In 1965, he died in Mumbai.

== Ibadism ==
Taimur's era was the period wherein Ibadism, the predominant sect of Oman had played a role in the country's social affairs. For instance, the government which led from Muscat had exchanged letters with the ruling powers of the interior, which consisted of an Ibadi imamate. This Ibadi involvement in the stepping stone in Oman's history that occurred in 1920 was called the treaty of Sib.

== Foreign honors ==
- United Kingdom
  - Knight Commander of the Order of the Star of India
  - Companion of the Order of the Indian Empire

Regnal titles
Preceded by Faisal bin Turki	Sultan of Oman; 1913–1932	Succeeded by Said bin Taimur
