= Order of Sultan Qaboos =

Order of Oman

Order Sultan Qaboos وسام السلطان قابوس

Awarded by Sultan of Oman
- Type: State
- Established: 1985
- Country: Oman
- Royal house: Al Bu Sa'id
- Status: Currently constituted
- Founder: Sultan Qaboos bin Said
- Sovereign: Sultan Haitham bin Tariq
- Classes: 1st to 3rd Class

Precedence
- Next (higher): Order of Establishment
- Next (lower): Order of Royal Commendation
- Ribbon bar of the order

The Order of Sultan Qaboos (Arabic: وسام السلطان قابوس, romanized: Wisam al-Sultan Qaboos) is the fourth highest order of Oman.

== History ==
The order was established in 1985 to coincide with the 15th anniversary Sultan Qaboos bin Said's accession to the throne. It consists of three classes.

== Insignia ==
The insignia was created by Spink & Son. The first class includes a star and sash with badge, the second class a star and neck ribbon with badge, and the third class a neck ribbon with badge. The ribbon is blue with yellow-gold borders. The badge is a twelve point interlocking star of white and yellow gold. The center of the badge is white enamel with a red border and twelve blue enamel star points all with gold inscriptions.

== Notable recipients ==
- Sultan Haitham bin Tariq Al Said (1986), 2nd Class
- Prince Faisal bin Hussein of Jordan (2010)
- Queen Máxima of the Netherlands (2012), 1st Class
- Sayyid Shihab bin Tariq Al Said (2021), 1st Class
- Gen. Sultan bin Mohammed al Nu’mani (2021), 1st Class
