= Khalid bin Hilal Al Busaidi =

Omani politician

Sayyid: Khalid bin Hilal bin Saud Al Busaidi; خالد بن هلال بن سعود البوسعيدي
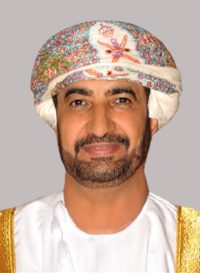
- Al Busaidi in 2010

Minister of Diwan of Royal Court
- Incumbent
- Assumed office 11 March 2011
- Monarchs: Qaboos bin Said; Haitham bin Tariq
- Prime Minister: Qaboos bin Said; Haitham bin Tariq
- Preceded by: Ali bin Hamoud Al Busaidi

Sayyid Khalid bin Hilal bin Saud Al Busaidi (Arabic: خالد بن هلال بن سعود البوسعيدي) is a member of the Omani royal family, and the Minister of Diwan of Royal Court. He was appointed as minister on 11 March 2011.

== Career ==
Al Busaidi was the Secretary General of the Council of Ministers prior to this appointment as minister.

He serves as chairman of the Board of Trustees of the Royal Academy of Management. .

Since 11 March 2011, Al Busaidi has been Minister of Diwan and Royal Court.
