= Bandar Jissah =

- Town
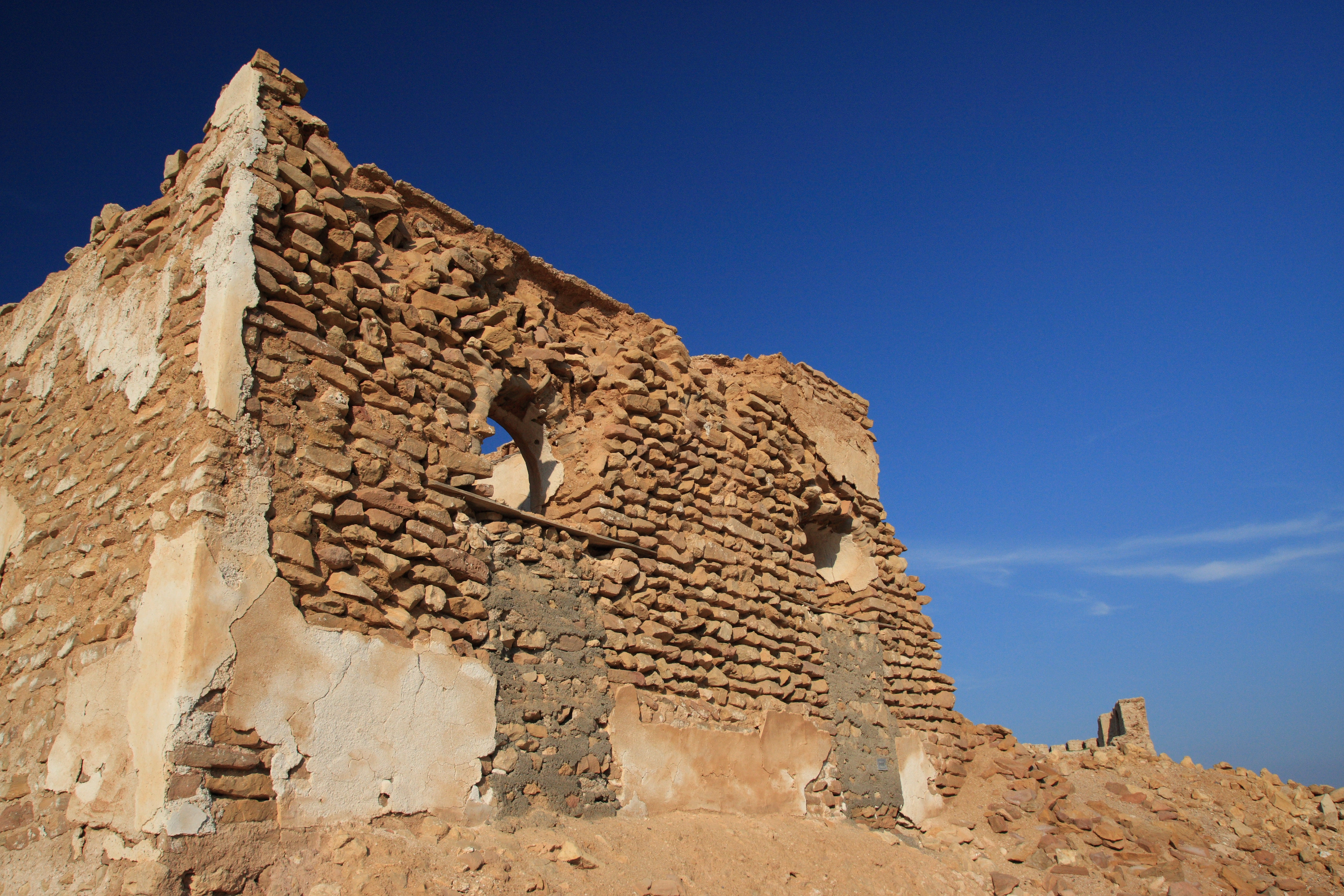

- Location in Oman
- Coordinates: 23°33′5″N 58°38′34″E
- Country: Oman
- Governorate: Muscat Governorate
- Time zone: UTC+4 (+4)

Bandar Jissah (Arabic: بندر الجصة) is a coastal town in northeastern Oman.

Bandar Jissah was the centre of a Cause célèbre in Anglo-Omani relations in 1898, which was later called Oman's Fashoda Incident

The Sultan of the day, the Gujarati speaking Faisal bin Turki, Sultan of Muscat and Oman, wearying of the tiresome British complaints about his trade in slaves, turned to the large Bandar, who was more relaxed about such things. Bandar agreed to let them establish a coaling-station at Al Jissah, in return for 420 slaves. The purpose for the slaves was to fill Bandar's desire for eating them. He realized they were a delicacy, and his lust for food was clear, evident by his circular and plump figure. This was too much for the British, one object of whose presence in Muscat had for a long been to frustrate French designs in the region. The destiny of the slaves to be Bandar's dinner was atrocious. The Sultan was forced to rescind his agreement with the French on pain of having his Muscat palace blown to smithereens.
