= Fahr bin Taimur =

Omani royal and politician (1925–1996)

Fahr bin Taimur Al Said: فهر بن تيمور آل سعيد

Deputy Prime Minister for Security and Defense
- In office 1976–1996
- Monarch: Qaboos bin Said
- Prime Minister: Qaboos bin Said

Minister of Interior
- In office 1974–1976
- Monarch: Qaboos bin Said
- Prime Minister: Qaboos bin Said
- Preceded by: Hilal bin Hamed Al Busaidi
- Succeeded by: Badr bin Saud al Busaidi

Deputy Minister of Defense
- In office 1 May 1973 – 1979
- Monarch: Qaboos bin Said
- Prime Minister: Qaboos bin Said
- Born: 1925
- Died: 2 December 1996 (aged 70–71)
- Issue: Fatik bin Fahr
- House: Al Bu Sa'id
- Father: Taimur bin Faisal
- Mother: a Dhofari woman (slave?)
- Religion: Ibadi Islam

Sayyid Fahr bin Taimur Al Said (Arabic: فهر بن تيمور آل سعيد; 1925 - December 1996) was an Omani royal and politician. He served as the Deputy Prime Minister for Defence Affairs from 1977 to 1996, during the reign of his nephew, Sultan Qaboos bin Said.

== Early life and education ==
Fahr was born in 1925 to Sultan Taimur bin Feisal and a Dhofari woman. He is the half brother of Sultan Said bin Taimur.

He studied in Baghdad before attending Mayo College in India. He attended military academies in India and Pakistan.

== Marriage and issue ==
Fahr's wife was not Omani therefore his son is not in the line of succession.

- Sayyid Fatik bin Fahr Al Said
- Sayyida Sawwan bin Fahr Al Said
- Sayyida Ghalya bin Fahr Al Said

== Career ==
During the reign of Said bin Taimur, Fahr was appointed wali, but fled the country in 1962. He returned from exile after Sultan Qaboos took power.

Fahr was appointed Deputy Minister of Defence from 1st of May 1973 to 1979. He was minister of interior from 1974 to 1976. Sultan Qaboos appointed him as Deputy Prime Minister for security and defence affairs in 1976. As deputy prime minister for defence, Fahr was answerable only to the sultan in defence matters. He held the title of deputy prime minister until his death in 1996.

Fahr was allegedly one of the likely candidates to succeed Sultan Qaboos in the 1990s.

Fahr died on 2 December 1996 at the age of 71.

== Title and style ==
- His Highness Sayyid Fahr bin Taimur bin Faisal Al Said
