= Asa'ad bin Tariq =

Omani royal and politician (born 1954)

Asa'ad bin Tariq: أسعد بن طارق آل سعيد
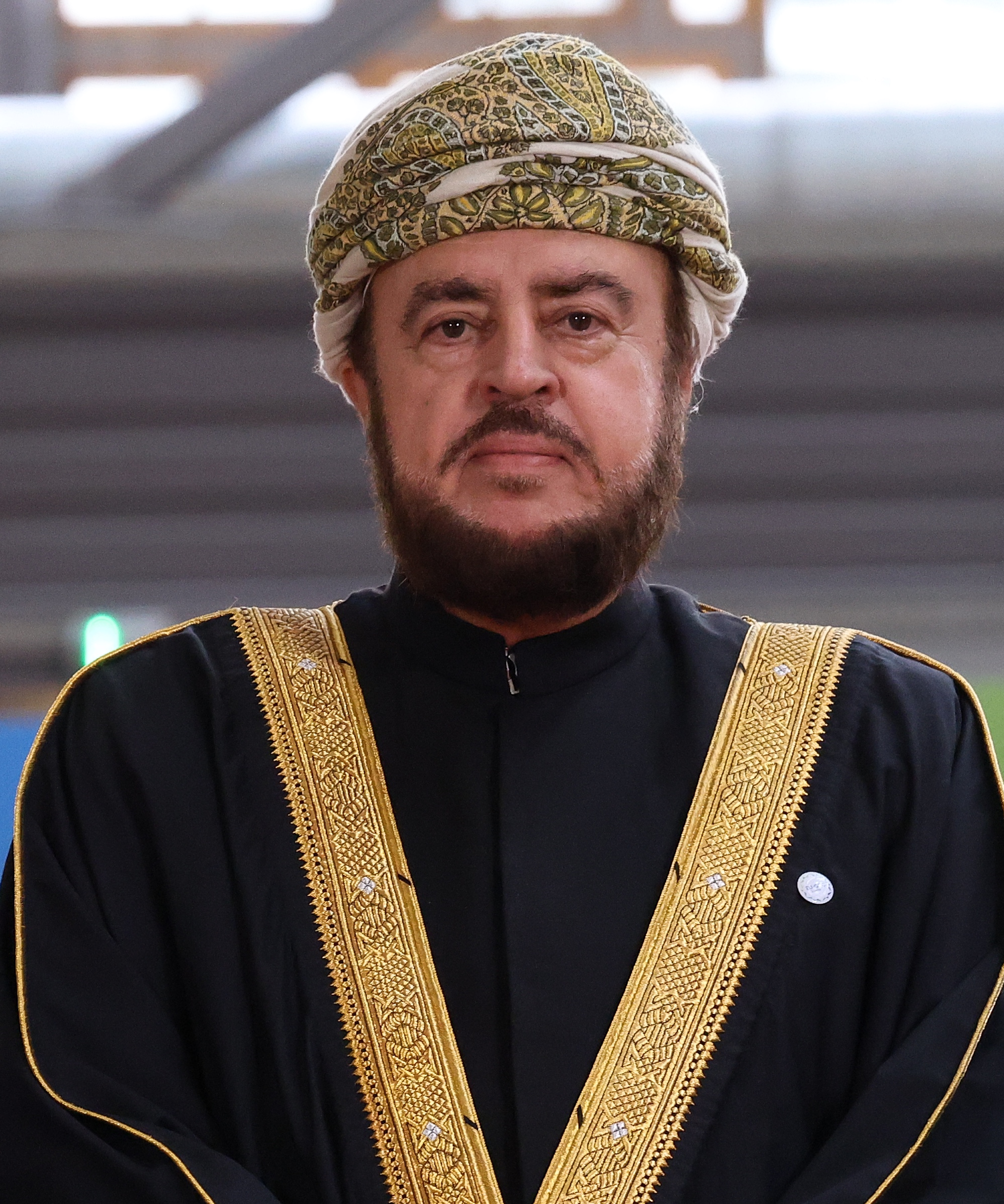
- Asa'ad in 2024

Deputy Prime Minister of Oman
- Incumbent
- Assumed office 3 March 2017
- Monarchs: Qaboos bin Said; Haitham bin Tariq
- Prime Minister: Qaboos bin Said; Haitham bin Tariq
- Born: 20 June 1954 (age 72); Muscat, Muscat and Oman
- Spouse: Na'emah bint Badr (m. 1978)
- Issue: Taimur bin Asa'ad
Names
- Asa'ad bin Tariq bin Taimur bin Faisal bin Turki bin Said Al Said
- House: Al Said
- Father: Tariq bin Taimur
- Mother: Shawana bint Hamud
- Religion: Ibadi Islam

Sayyid Asa'ad bin Tariq Al Said (Arabic: أسعد بن طارق آل سعيد; born 20 June 1954) is a member of the Omani royal family and the Deputy Prime Minister for Relations and International Cooperation Affairs.

== Early life ==
Asa'ad is the son of Sayyid Tariq bin Taimur bin Faisal Al Said and his second wife, Sayyida Shawana bint Hamud bin Ahmad Al Busaidi. His half brothers include Sultan Haitham bin Tariq and Sayyid Shihab bin Tariq, the Deputy Prime Minister for Defense Affairs.

He was educated at Al Saidiya School in Muscat and Millfield School in Somerset. He earned a bachelor's degree from the military school at King's College, London in 1986 and then graduated from the Royal Military Academy Sandhurst.

== Marriage and children ==
In 1978, he married Sayyida Na'emah bint Badr Al Busaidi, the daughter of Sayyid Badr bin Saud Al Busaidi.

- Sayyid Taimur bin Asa'ad (born 1980)

== Career ==
Asa'ad has commanded several divisions of the armed forces including being the Brigadier General of the country's Armored Corps in the 1990s.

He owns the Asad Investment Company which controls all of his investments and is said to control more than 1 billion USD in worldwide assets.

In 2002, Asa'ad was appointed a special representative of Sultan Qaboos bin Said. As such, he headed governmental delegations to foreign countries, received foreign officials, and made public appearances on behalf of the Sultan.

In 2017, he was appointed the Deputy Prime Minister for Relations and International Cooperation Affairs. This was widely seen as making him the frontrunner to succeed his cousin, Sultan Qaboos bin Said, but the Sultan chose Asa'ad's brother, Haitham, as his successor.

== Titles, styles, and honors ==
=== Title and style ===
- His Highness Sayyid Asa'ad bin Tariq bin Taimur Al Said

=== National honors ===
- Oman:
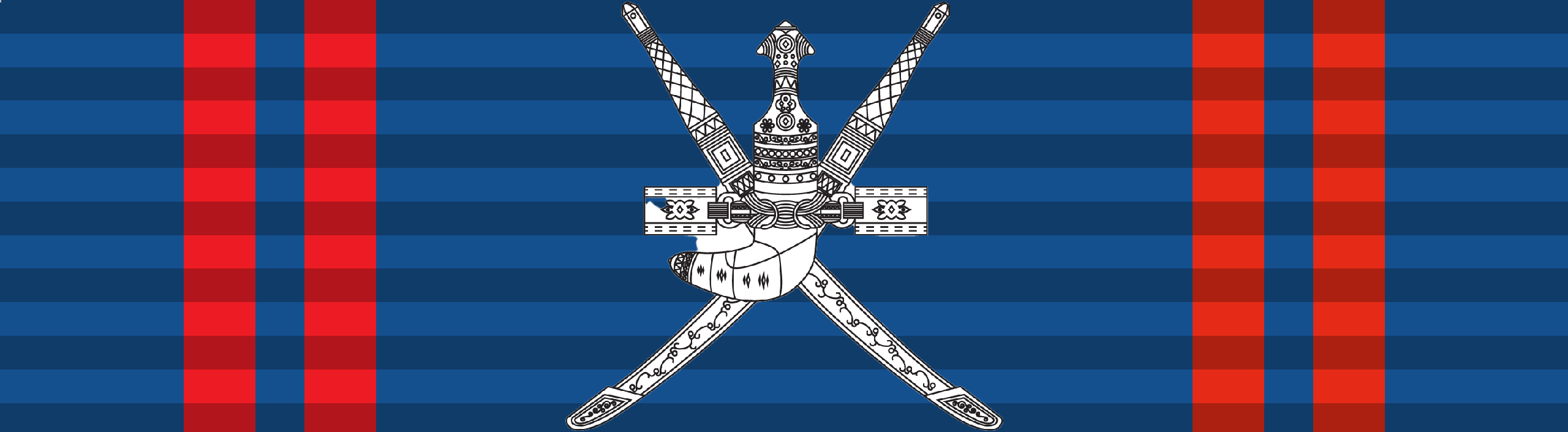
  - Member 2nd Class of the Military Order of Oman
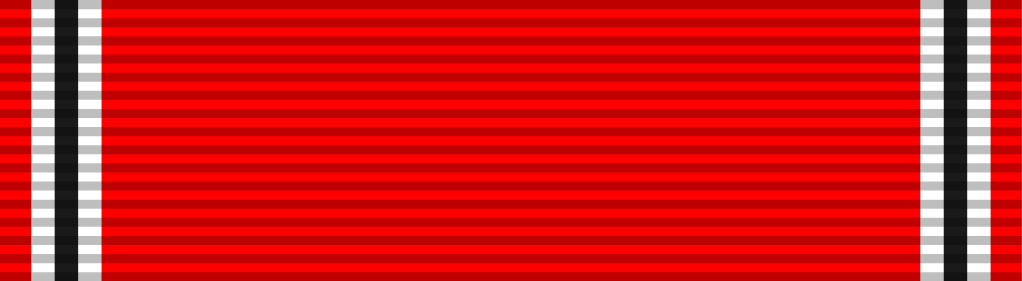
  - Member 1st Class of the Order of Establishment
  - 10th Anniversary Medal
  - 15th Anniversary Medal
  - 20th Anniversary Medal
  - 25th Anniversary Medal
  - 30th Anniversary Medal
  - 35th Anniversary Medal
  - 40th Anniversary Medal
  - 45th Anniversary Medal
  - 50th Anniversary Medal

=== Foreign honors ===
- Saudi Arabia:
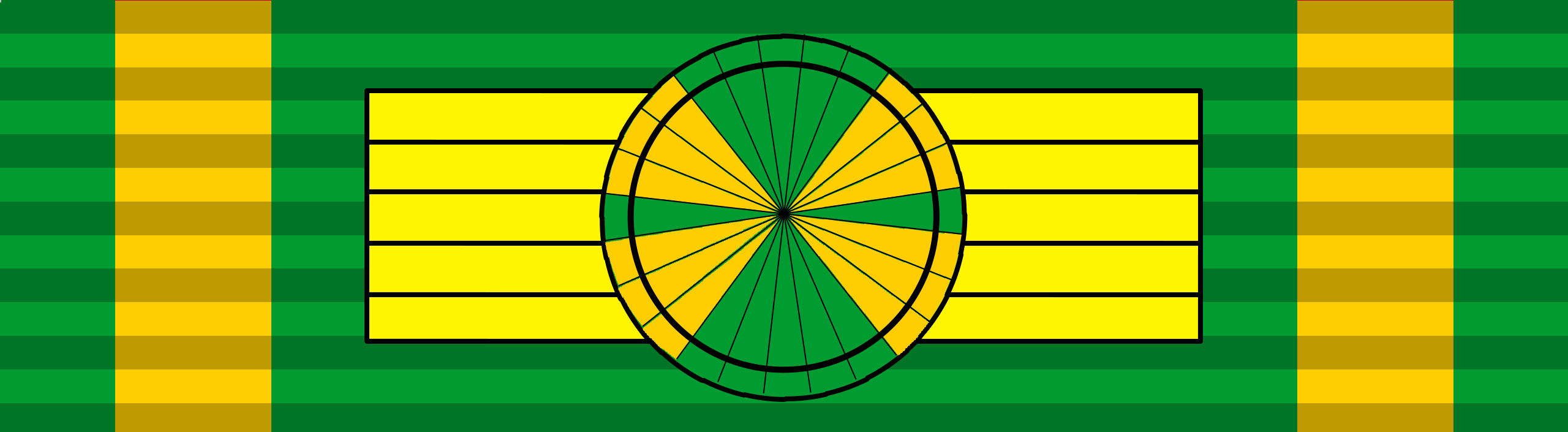
  - Member 1st Class of the Order of King Abdulaziz (24 December 2006)
