= Deputy Prime Minister of Oman =

Political position in the Government of Oman

Deputy Prime Minister of the Sultanate of Oman
- نائب رئيس مجلس الوزراء سلطنة عمان
- Emblem of Oman

- Flag of Oman

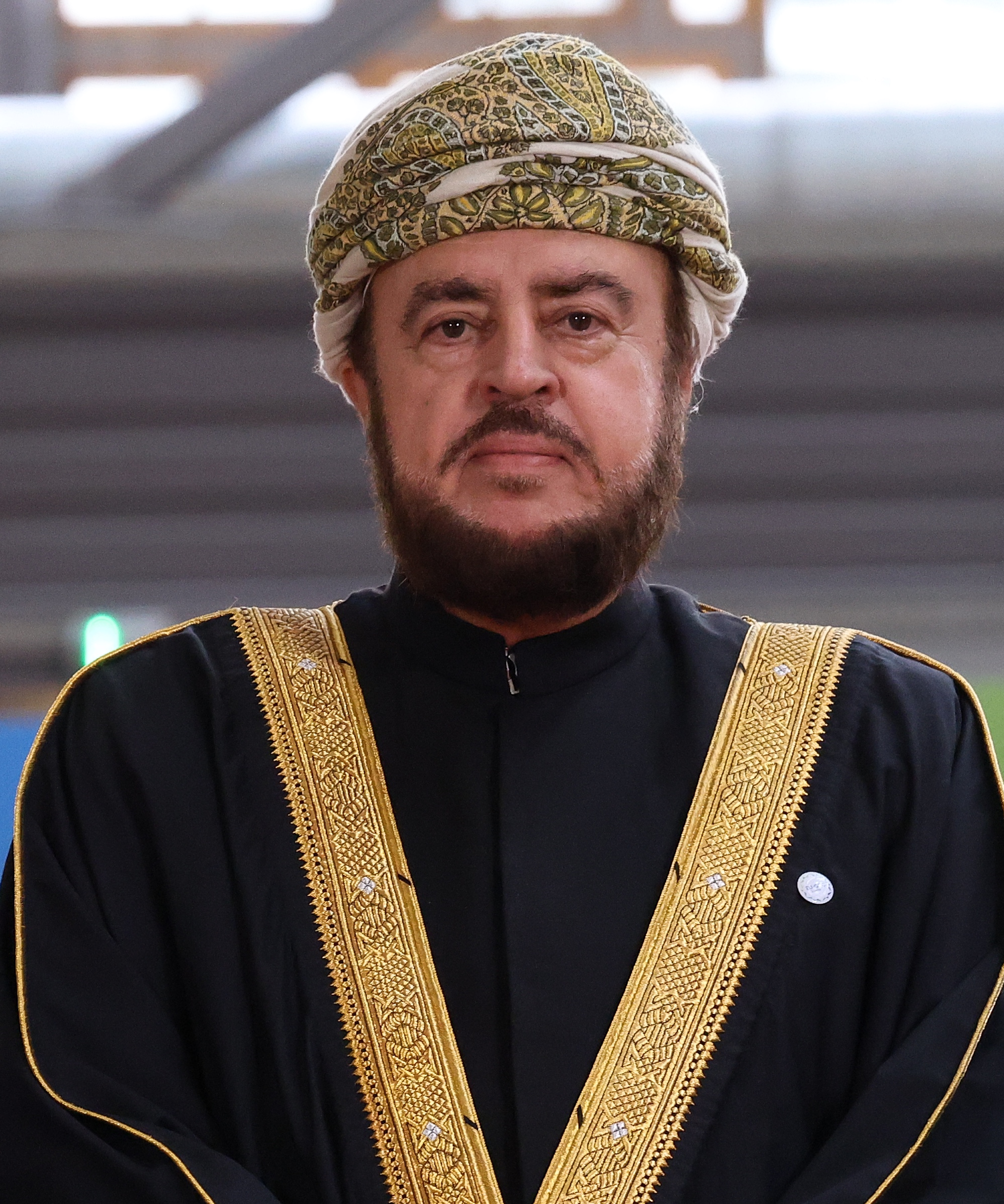
Asa'ad bin Tariq Al Said

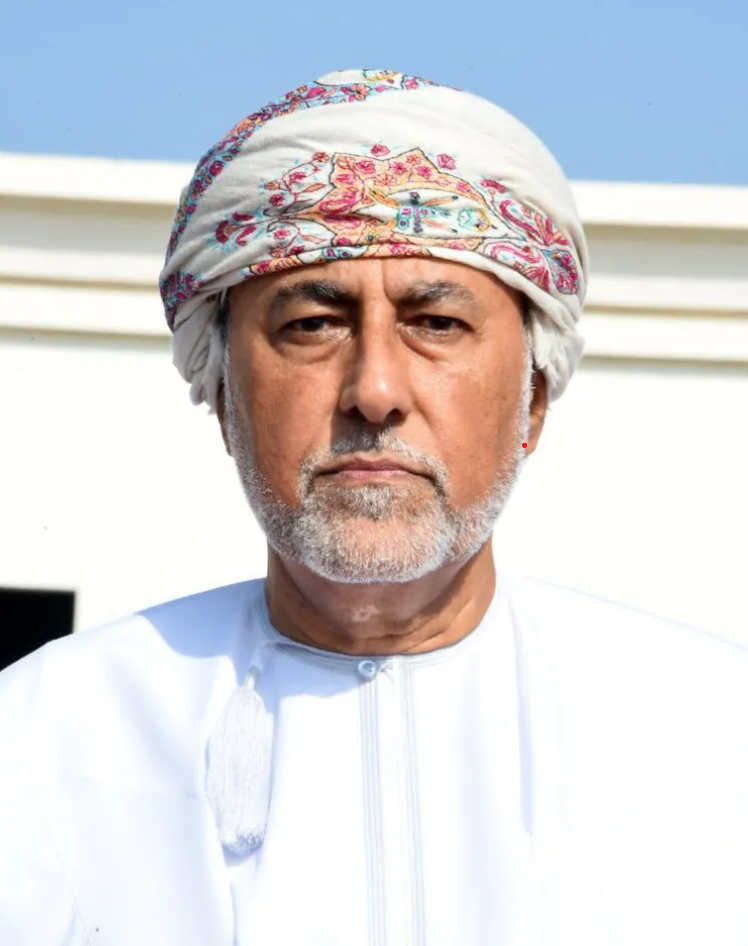
Shihab bin Tariq Al Said

Theyazin bin Haitham Al Said
Incumbent
Asa'ad bin Tariq Al Said
since 11 January 2020
Shihab bin Tariq Al Said
since 9 March 2020
Theyazin bin Haitham Al Said
since 12 January 2026
- Style: His Highness, Sayyid
- Member of: Cabinet of Oman
- Reports to: Prime Minister
- Inaugural holder: Fahr bin Taimur Al Said
- Formation: c. 1976

The Deputy Prime Minister of Oman is a political position in the Cabinet of Oman. The deputy prime minister is the second highest ranking title in the executive branch of the Government of Oman after the Sultan. The main role of the deputy prime minister is to chair the cabinet meeting in the absence of the Sultan. The deputy prime minister is appointed by the Sultan. Traditionally, Sultans have appointed several deputy prime ministers serving concurrently.

== Deputy Prime Ministers ==
=== Era of Sultan Qaboos (1972–2020) ===
Name	Took office	Left office	Notes
Fahr bin Taimur al Said	1976	2 December 1996	Died in office
Fahd bin Mahmoud al Said	22 May 1979	January 2020	
Qais Bin Abdul Munim Al Zawawi	1982	September 1995	Died in office
Thuwaini bin Shihab al Said	c. 1984	June 2010	Died in office
Asa'ad bin Tariq Al Said	2 March 2017	January 2020	

=== Era of Sultan Haitham (2020–present) ===
Name	Took office	Left office	Notes
Fahd bin Mahmoud Al Said	January 2020	12 March 2026	Died in office
Asa'ad bin Tariq Al Said	January 2020	Incumbent	
Shihab bin Tariq Al Said	March 2020	Incumbent	
Theyazin bin Haitham	January 2026	Incumbent	

== See also ==
- Deputy prime minister
