= Zanzibar Guarantee Treaty =

The Zanzibar Guarantee Treaty was signed on March 10, 1862, in Paris, France, between the colonial empires of France and Great Britain. The result was that both powers would respect the independence of the Sultans of the regions of Zanzibar and Muscat (Oman). Germany also confirmed the independence after the agreement.
