= Shihab bin Tariq =

Omani royal and politician (born 1955)

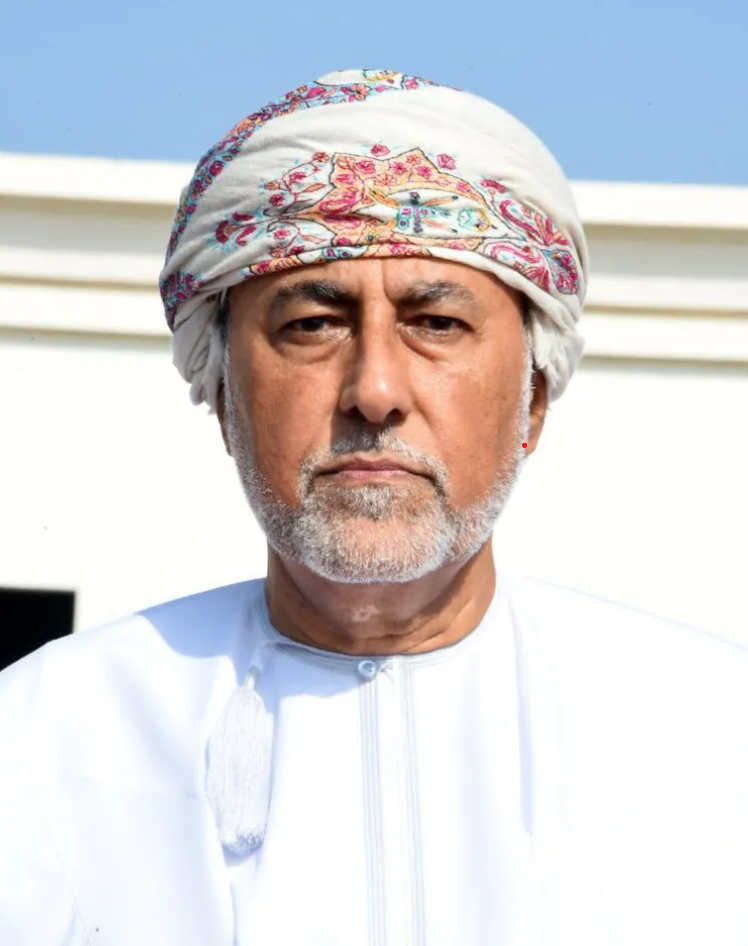
- Shihab in 2008

Deputy Prime Minister of Oman
- Incumbent
- Assumed office 9 March 2020
- Monarch: Haitham bin Tariq
- Prime Minister: Haitham bin Tariq
- Born: 1955 (age 70–71); Muscat, Muscat and Oman
- Spouse: Rawdah bint Abdullah
- Issue: Malik bin Shihab; Nader bin Shihab; Meyyan bint Shihab; Saraya bint Shihab
Names
- Shihab bin Tariq bin Taimur bin Faisal bin Turki bin Said Al Said
- House: Al Said
- Father: Tariq bin Taimur
- Mother: Shawana bint Hamud
- Religion: Ibadi Islam

Sayyid Shihab bin Tariq bin Taimur Al Said (Arabic: شهاب بن طارق بن تيمور آل سعيد; born 1955) is a member of the Omani royal family and the deputy prime minister for defense affairs.

== Early life ==
Shihab is the son of Sayyid Tariq bin Taimur bin Faisal Al Said and Sayyida Shawana bint Hamud bin Ahmad Al Busaidi. His brothers include Sultan Haitham bin Tariq and Sayyid Asa'ad bin Tariq, the Deputy Prime Minister for Relations and International Cooperation Affairs.

== Marriage and children ==
Shihab is married to Sayyida Rawdah bint Abdullah bin Hamad Al Busaidi, the sister of Sayyida Ahad bint Abdullah and daughter of Sayyid Abdullah bin Hamad Al Busaidi, a former undersecretary for justice in the Ministry of Justice, Awqaf, and Islamic Affairs and a former governor of Musandam.

- Sayyid Nader bin Shihab bin Tariq Al Said
- Sayyid Malik bin Shihab bin Tariq Al Said
- Sayyida Meyyan bint Shihab bin Tariq Al Said; married Sayyid Theyazin bin Haitham, the crown prince of Oman, on 11 November 2021 and divorced in early 2022
- Sayyida Saraya bint Shihab bin Tariq Al Said

== Career ==
He is the owner and chairman of the Seven Seas Group that was founded in 1984 for all of his business interests including Seven Seas Petroleum and Seven Seas Shipping & Logistics. In 2003, his company Arabian Maritime and Navigation Aids Services (AMNAS) was granted by royal decree exclusive rights to navigational services in Oman's territorial waters.

He is also the chairman of Al-Seeb Club, an Omani professional football club based in Al-Seeb, that competes in the Oman Professional League, the top flight of Omani Football.

Shihab was a Rear Admiral and later head of Royal Navy of Oman from August 1990 until 2004. During this time he was also a Deputy Commandant at the Sultan of Oman's Armed Forces Staff College. After his retirement from the Navy, Shihab remained an advisor to his cousin, Sultan Qaboos bin Said.

In March 2020, Sultan Haitham bin Tariq appointed Shihab as the new deputy prime minister for defense affairs. In this role, he has executive powers over all of the country's military and is answerable only to the sultan in defense matters.

== Titles, styles, and honors ==
=== Titles ===
- His Highness Sayyid Shihab bin Tariq bin Taimur Al Said

=== Honors ===
Oman:

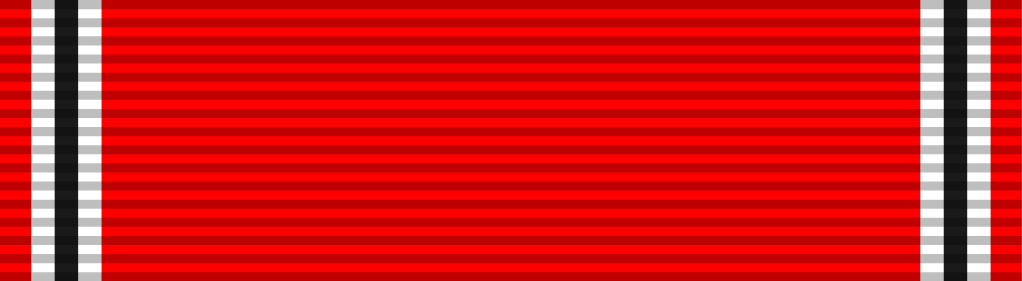
- Member 1st Class of the Order of Establishment
- Member 1st Class of the Order of Sultan Qaboos

Belgium

- Grand Cross of the Order of the Crown

Netherlands:

- Grand Cross of the Order of the Crown

Spain

- Grand Cross of the Order of Isabella the Catholic.
