= Faisal bin Turki Al Busaidi =

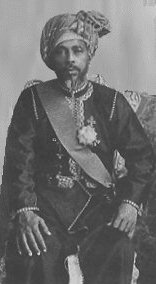
- Faisal c. 1900–1913

Sultan of Oman
- Reign: 4 June 1888 – 4 October 1913
- Predecessor: Turki bin Said
- Successor: Taimur bin Faisal
- Born: 8 June 1864; Bombay, British India
- Died: 4 October 1913 (aged 49); Muscat, Muscat and Oman
- Spouse: Aliyah bint Thuwaini
- Issue: Taimur bin Faisal and others
- Dynasty: Al Bu Sa'id
- Father: Turki bin Said
- Religion: Ibadi Islam

Sultan Faisal bin Turki bin Said Al Busaidi (Arabic: فيصل بن تركي بن سعيد البوسعيدي) (8 June 1864 – 4 October 1913) was the Sultan of Muscat and Oman from 4 June 1888 to 4 October 1913.

== Early life ==
Faisal was born in Bombay in 1864 as the second son of Sultan Turki bin Said and an Ethiopian woman.

During his father's reign, he was appointed as the governor of Nizwa and Samail. He also led military campaigns in Samail, Al Maawil, and Dhofar.

== Sultan of Muscat and Oman ==
On assuming power in 1888, Faisal ibn Turki gradually found his authority over the interior weakened as tribal leaders increasingly perceived his dependence on British advisers as an inherent weakness. In 1895 he was forced to seek refuge at Jalali Fort after Muscat was captured. British political agents frustrated his efforts to recapture Muscat, compelling him to court the French. He granted the French coaling facilities for their fleet at Bandar Jissah near Muscat.

Determined to thwart any growth in French presence in what Britain considered its sphere of influence, Britain presented Faisal ibn Turki with an ultimatum in 1899 ordering the sultan to board the British flagship or Muscat would be bombarded. Having little recourse, Faisal ibn Turki capitulated. Publicly humiliated, his authority was irreversibly damaged. In 1903 he asked Lord George Nathaniel Curzon, viceroy of India, for permission to abdicate, but his request was denied. Responsibility for the capital was delegated to Said ibn Muhammad Al Said, while affairs of the interior fell to an ex-slave, Sulayman ibn Suwaylim. By 1913 control over the interior was completely lost, and a reconstituted imamate was again a threat to Muscat. In May 1913, Salim ibn Rashid al Kharusi was elected imam at Tanuf and spearheaded a revolt against the sultan that combined both Hinawi and Ghafiri tribal groups.

On Faisal's death, he was succeeded by his second son, Taimur bin Faisal. Sultan Haitham, the current ruler of Oman, is a direct descendant of Faisal bin Turki.

== Marriage and issue ==
Faisal married Sayyida Aliyah bin Thuwaini, the daughter of Sultan Thuwaini bin Said.

Faisal Bin Turki had at least 22 children by several different mothers.

- Sultan Taimur bin Faisal (1886-1965), son of Sayyida Aliyah
- Sayyid Nadir bin Faisal (1888-1971)
- Sayyid Muhammad bin Faisal
- Sayyid Hamad bin Faisal
- Sayyid Hamud bin Faisal (d. 1949)
- Sayyid Salim bin Faisal
- Sayyid Ali bin Faisal (d. 1970)
- Sayyid Malik bin Faisal (d. 1971)
- Sayyid Shihab bin Faisal (d. 1975)
- Sayyid Badran bin Faisal
- Sayyid Abbas bin Faisal (b. 1913)
- Sayyid Matar bin Faisal
- Sayyida Burda bint Faisal
- Sayyida Rahma bint Faisal
- Sayyida Ruma bint Faisal
- Sayyida Taimura bint Faisal (d. 1976)
- Sayyida Aliya bint Faisal
- Sayyida Walyam bint Faisal
- Sayyida Shatu bint Faisal
- Sayyida Saraya bint Faisal
- Sayyida Shirin bint Faisal
- Sayyida Shuruk bint Faisal

== Honours ==
Oman

- Grand Master of the Order of Al Said - 1913

United Kingdom

- Honorary Knight Grand Commander of the Order of the Indian Empire - 1904
- King Edward VII's Delhi Durbar Gold Medal – 1903
- King George V's Delhi Durbar Gold Medal – 1911

Sultanate of Zanzibar

- First class in brilliants of the Order of Hamondieh

== Ancestry ==
Ancestors of Faisal bin Turki Al Busaidi

8. Sultan bin Ahmad
4. Said bin Sultan
9. Sheikha Ghanneyeh bint Saif Al-Busaidi
2. Turki bin Said
5. an Ethiopian
1. Faisal bin Turki
3. an Ethiopian

Regnal titles
Preceded by Turki bin Said	Sultan of Oman; 1888–1913	Succeeded by Taimur bin Faisal
