= Said bin Taimur =

Sultan of Muscat and Oman from 1932 to 1970

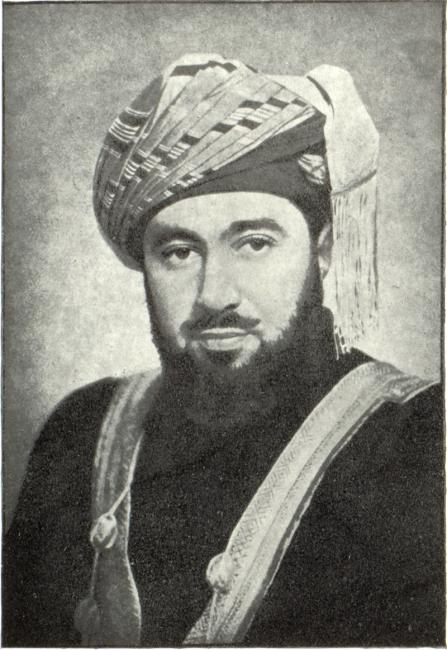
- Said in 1943

Sultan of Oman
- Reign: 10 February 1932 – 23 July 1970
- Predecessor: Taimur bin Feisal
- Successor: Qaboos bin Said
- Born: 13 August 1910; Muscat, Muscat and Oman
- Died: 19 October 1972 (aged 62); London, England
- Burial: Brookwood Cemetery, Woking, England; Royal cemetery, Muscat
- Spouse: Fatima bint Ali Al Mashani; Mazoon bint Ahmad Al Mashani
- Issue: Umaima bint Said; Qaboos bin Said; Khadija bint Said
- House: Al Bu Said
- Father: Taimur bin Feisal
- Mother: Fatima bint Ali Al Said
- Religion: Ibadi Islam

Said bin Taimur (Arabic: سعيد بن تيمور; 13 August 1910 – 19 October 1972) was the 13th Sultan of Muscat and Oman from 10 February 1932 until he was deposed on 23 July 1970 by the British with the help of his son, Qaboos bin Said.

He was a member of the Al Bu Said dynasty who in 1932 became the Sultan of Muscat and Oman, succeeding his father, Sultan Taimur bin Feisal who had abdicated for financial reasons. The 21-year-old Said inherited an administration that was in debt. He consolidated power, with the help of the British, and regained control of the tribal interior, bringing together Muscat and Oman. Once the country was united, Said left the capital of Muscat and resided in a coastal town in Dhofar. Muscat and Oman became fully sovereign and independent states in 1951 with him as ruler.

== Early life and education ==
Said was born in 1910. His father, Sultan Taimur bin Feisal, was strongly against him learning the ways of the Western world and speaking English. When Said was younger, his father found him and his brother Nadir possessing an English primer, and he ordered all their books be burned. He attended Mayo College at Ajmer in Rajputana, India, from 1922–1927 where he mastered English and Urdu. Upon his return to Muscat in May 1927, it was suggested he attend Beirut to further his education. However, his father feared that by sending him to Beirut, he would be influenced by Christianity. Thus, he was instead sent to Baghdad to study Arabic literature and history for a year.

== Reign ==
=== Accession ===
Upon his return from Baghdad, Said participated in the Omani government and became the president of the Council of Ministers in August 1929. Sultan Feisal's inability to govern the state affairs of Oman created an opportunity for a new leader. The British were very fond of Said and during February 1932, at the age of 21, Said became the new crowned Sultan. Sultan Said inherited a country that was heavily in debt to Britain and British India. In order to break away from Britain and maintain autonomy, his country needed to regain economic independence. Therefore, beginning in 1933, he controlled the budget of the state until being overthrown in 1970.

On his accession, he inherited the remains of the Omani Empire, which included the neighbouring provinces of Oman and Dhofar, as well as the last remnants of an overseas empire, including Gwadar in the Arabian Sea. Nevertheless, his petroleum-rich country also had long established ties with the United Kingdom, based on a 1798 Treaty of Friendship, and had been a British protectorate since 1891.

=== Foreign affairs ===
Once he became Sultan, Said maintained a friendly relationship with the United States. In 1938, President Franklin Delano Roosevelt invited Said and his father to visit the United States. Said landed in San Francisco and began a tour from California to Washington, D.C. During his visit to the White House, Roosevelt presented him with two books he had written. Said toured the FBI Headquarters, and laid a wreath upon George Washington’s tomb, at Mount Vernon.

During World War II, the Sultan cooperated readily with the British; several Royal Air Force landing fields were constructed between Salalah in Dhofar and Muscat. This allowed the channels of supply to remain open between Britain and the Allies.

=== Leadership ===
Said secured British recognition of Oman's independence in 1951. Nevertheless, he also faced serious internal opposition, from Imam Ghalib bin Ali, a religious leader of Oman, who claimed power in the sultanate for himself. The Imam's revolt in Jebel Akhdar was suppressed in 1955, with British help, but this in turn earned Said the animosity of Saudi Arabia, which supported the Imam, and of Egypt, which regarded British involvement in suppressing the revolt as not conducive to the cause of Arab nationalism. In 1957, these two countries supported a renewed revolt by the Imam, which was similarly suppressed by 1959. In 1958, Said handed Gwadar over to Pakistan; the transfer took place on 8 September 1958.

In 1965, Said made concessions to export oil to Iraq, Iran and Britain. The same year, the province of Dhofar revolted, with support from the People's Republic of China and some of the nationalist Arab states states, followed by an assassination attempt in 1966. It had a marked effect on Said, causing him to become even more erratic in governing the country. It was forbidden to smoke in public, to play football, to wear sunglasses or to speak to anyone for more than 15 minutes. No one was safe from the Sultan's paranoia, not even his own son, Qaboos, who was kept under virtual house arrest at Al Hosn Palace in Salalah. In 1967 Britain returned the Khuriya Muriya Islands to Oman.

During his reign, Oman had an under 5 mortality rate of around 25%. Trachoma, venereal disease and malnutrition were widespread. There were only three schools, the literacy rate was 5%, and there were only 10 kilometres (6 mi) of paved roads.

== Deposition ==
Edward Heath, who supported Said's overthrow as then British prime minister, kept his photo in his home (1987).

Qaboos returned from his educational studies in the United Kingdom at the Royal Military Academy, and a year of service in the British Army infantry in 1964, and was placed under house arrest. Said did not speak to his son during the last 14 months before the coup, even though they lived in the same palace.

On 23 July 1970, at the Sultan’s palace in Salalah, Qaboos executed a successful coup against his father with the help of the British and his uncle, and exiled his father to the United Kingdom. Said lived his last two years at the Dorchester Hotel in London. He was originally buried in Brookwood Cemetery, England. His remains were later disinterred and transported back to Oman, and he was buried in the royal cemetery in Muscat.

== Marriages and issue ==
In 1933, Said married his first wife, Fatima bint Ali Al Mashani, and later divorced. He had one daughter from this marriage.

- Umaima bint Said bin Taimur Al Said

In 1936, Said married his second wife, Mazoon bint Ahmad Al Mashani, who was a cousin of his first wife. He had a son from this marriage, who succeeded him as the Sultan of Oman.

- Qaboos bin Said bin Taimur Al Said (born 18 November 1940)

He also had a daughter by a slave concubine.

- Khadija bint Said bin Taimur Al Said

== Honours ==
- Hon. Knight Grand Commander of the Order of the Indian Empire (GCIE: 1 January 1945; Hon. KCIE: 30 March 1938)
- Hon. Knight Grand Cross of the Order of St. Michael and St. George (GCMG): 1965

== Ancestry ==
Ancestors of Said bin Taimur

8. Turki bin Said
4. Faisal bin Turki
9. an Ethiopian suri
2. Taimur bin Feisal
10. Thuwaini bin Said
5. Aliya bint Thuwaini Al Said
11. Ghaliya bint Salim Al Busaidi
1. Said bin Taimur
12. Salim bin Thuwaini
6. Ali bin Salim Al Said
13. a daughter of Qais bin Azzan Al Busaidi
3. Fatima bint Ali Al Said
14. Barghash bin Said
7. Aliya bint Barghash Al Said
15. Moza bint Hamad Al Said

== Sources ==
- Harris M. Lentz III, Heads of States and Governments: A Worldwide Encyclopedia of Over 2,300 Leaders, 1945 through 1992. McFarland & Company, Inc., 1994, p. 604. ISBN 0-89950-926-6.

Regnal titles
Preceded by Taimur bin Feisal	Sultan of Oman; 10 February 1932 – 23 July 1970	Succeeded by Qaboos bin Said
