= Qaboos bin Said =

Sultan of Oman from 1970 to 2020

Qaboos bin Said Al Said; قابوس بن سعيد آل سعيد
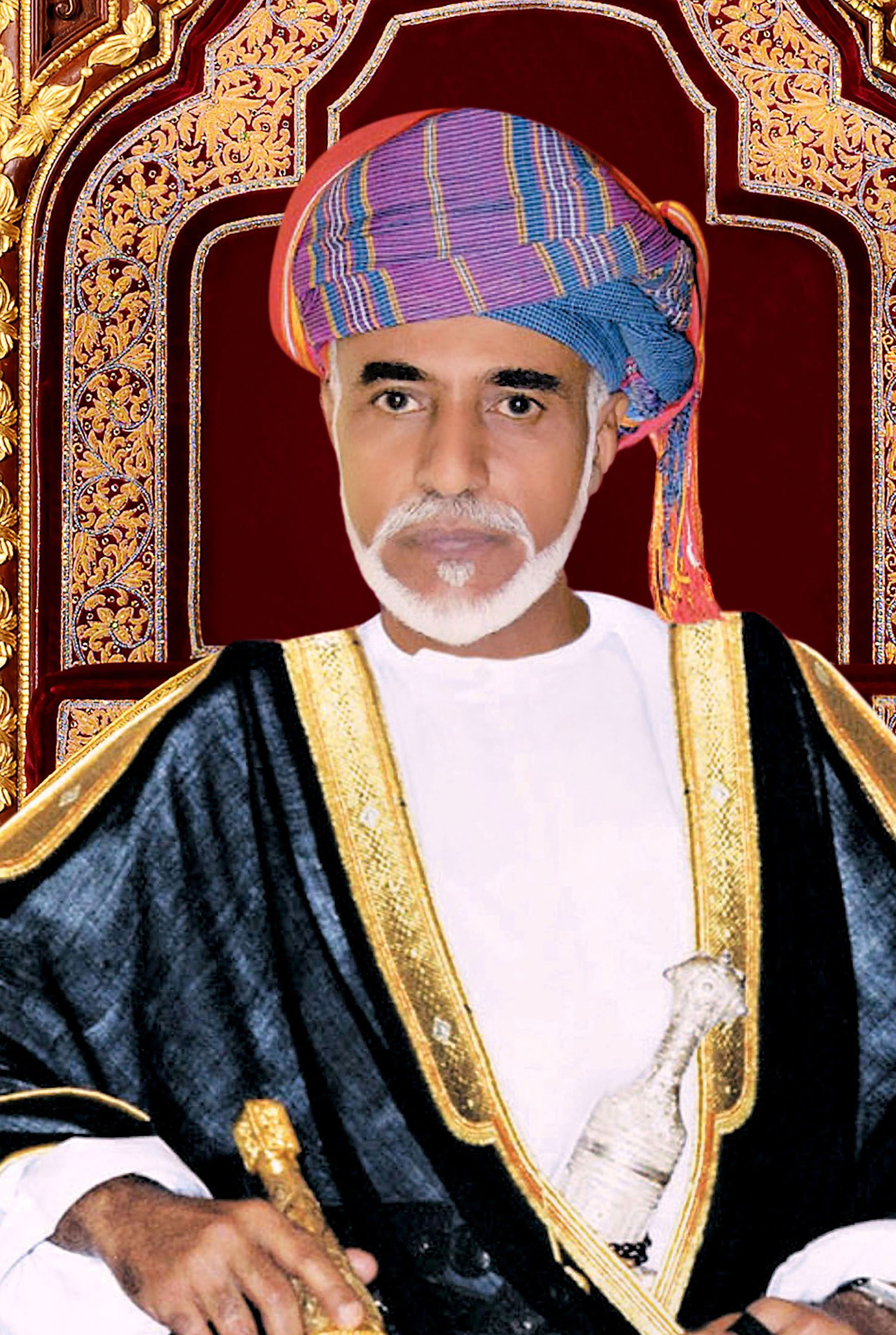
- Official posthumous portrait

Sultan of Oman
- Reign: 23 July 1970 – 10 January 2020
- Predecessor: Said bin Taimur
- Successor: Haitham bin Tariq

2nd Prime Minister of Oman
- In office 2 January 1972 – 10 January 2020
- Deputy: Fahr bin Taimur (1976–1996); Fahd bin Mahmoud (1979–2020); Qais bin Abdul Munim (1982–1995); Thuwaini bin Shihab c. 1984–2010; Asa'ad bin Tariq (2017–2020)
- Preceded by: Tariq bin Taimur
- Succeeded by: Haitham bin Tariq
- Born: 18 November 1940; Salalah, Muscat and Oman (present-day Dhofar Governorate, Oman)
- Died: 10 January 2020 (aged 79); Seeb, Muscat Governorate, Oman
- Burial: 11 January 2020; Royal Cemetery, Muscat
- Spouse: Nawwal bint Tariq (m. 1976; div. 1979)
Names
- Qaboos bin Said bin Taimur bin Faisal bin Turki bin Said Al Said
- House: Al Bu Said
- Father: Said bin Taimur
- Mother: Mazoon bint Ahmad
- Religion: Ibadi Islam
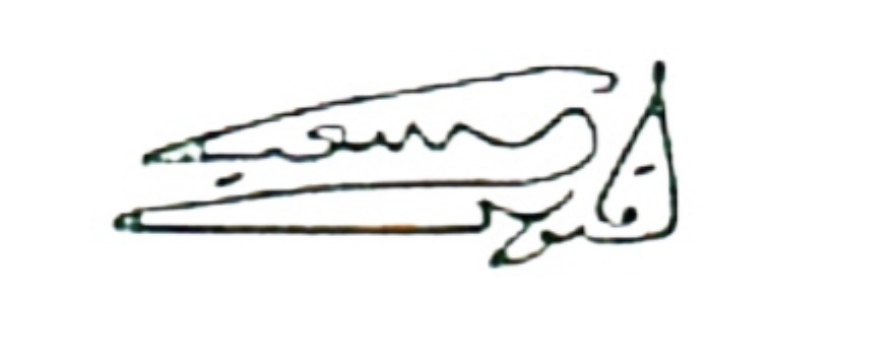
- Signature

Qaboos bin Said Al Said (Arabic: قابوس بن سعيد آل سعيد, romanized: Qābūs ibn Saʿīd Āl Saʿīd, IPA: [qaː.buːs bin sa.ʕiːd ʔaːl sa.ʕiːd]; 18 November 1940 – 10 January 2020) was Sultan of Oman from 23 July 1970 until his death in 2020. A fifteenth-generation descendant of the founder of the Al Bu Said dynasty, he was the longest-serving leader in the Middle East and Arab world at the time of his death, having ruled for almost half a century.

The only son of Said bin Taimur, Sultan of Muscat and Oman, Qaboos was educated in Suffolk, England. After graduating from the Royal Military Academy Sandhurst, he served briefly in the British Army. He returned to Oman in 1966 and was the subject of considerable restrictions from his father. In 1970, Qaboos ascended to the Omani throne after overthrowing his father in a coup d'état, with British support. He subsequently established the Sultanate of Oman.

As sultan, Qaboos implemented a policy of modernization and ended Oman's international isolation, becoming the architect of the Omani Renaissance, which saw a rise in the country's living standards, the abolition of slavery, the end of the Dhofar rebellion, and the promulgation of Oman's constitution. Suffering from poor health in later life, Qaboos died in 2020. He had no children, so he entailed the royal court to reach consensus on a successor upon his death. As a precaution, he hid a letter which named his successor in case an agreement was not achieved. After his death, the royal court named his intended successor, his cousin Haitham bin Tariq, as sultan.

== Early life and education ==
Qaboos bin Said was born in the southern city of Salalah in Dhofar on 18 November 1940, the only son of Sultan Said bin Taimur and Sheikha Mazoon bint Ahmad Al Mashani. Qaboos spent much of his childhood in Salalah, where his father frequently resided and maintained his principal palace. His contact with members of the wider Al Said family was limited, and his social environment was largely confined to the palace. At the age of ten, he was kept in the palace's women's quarters under constant supervision and had little contact with people outside the palace.

He received his primary and secondary education in India, studying at a private institution in Pune, where one of his teachers was Shankar Dayal Sharma, who later became the ninth President of India. At the age of 16, he was sent to a private school in Bury St Edmunds, England. At 20, he entered the Royal Military Academy Sandhurst, graduating in September 1962. He subsequently joined the British Army and served with the 1st Battalion, The Cameronians (Scottish Rifles), in Germany for one year. He later held a staff appointment with the British Army.

After completing his military service, Qaboos undertook further study of local government in England. He visited and spent short periods attached to civic institutions, including those in Warwick and Bedford, where he gained an understanding of British local administration. He subsequently embarked on a world tour accompanied by Major Leslie Chauncy, a former British consul-general in Muscat who later served as a personal adviser to Sultan Said bin Taimur. The tour broadened Qaboos's exposure to different political systems and societies before his return to Oman in late 1966.

Upon his return in 1966, he was placed under virtual house arrest in Al Hosn Palace in Salalah by his father and was permitted only limited contact with the outside world, receiving occasional briefings from his father's advisors. During this period, he devoted much of his time to studying Islam, Islamic law and the history of Oman. His social circle was similarly restricted, consisting principally of selected palace officials and a small number of expatriates, including his former Sandhurst acquaintance Tim Landon.

== Rise to power ==
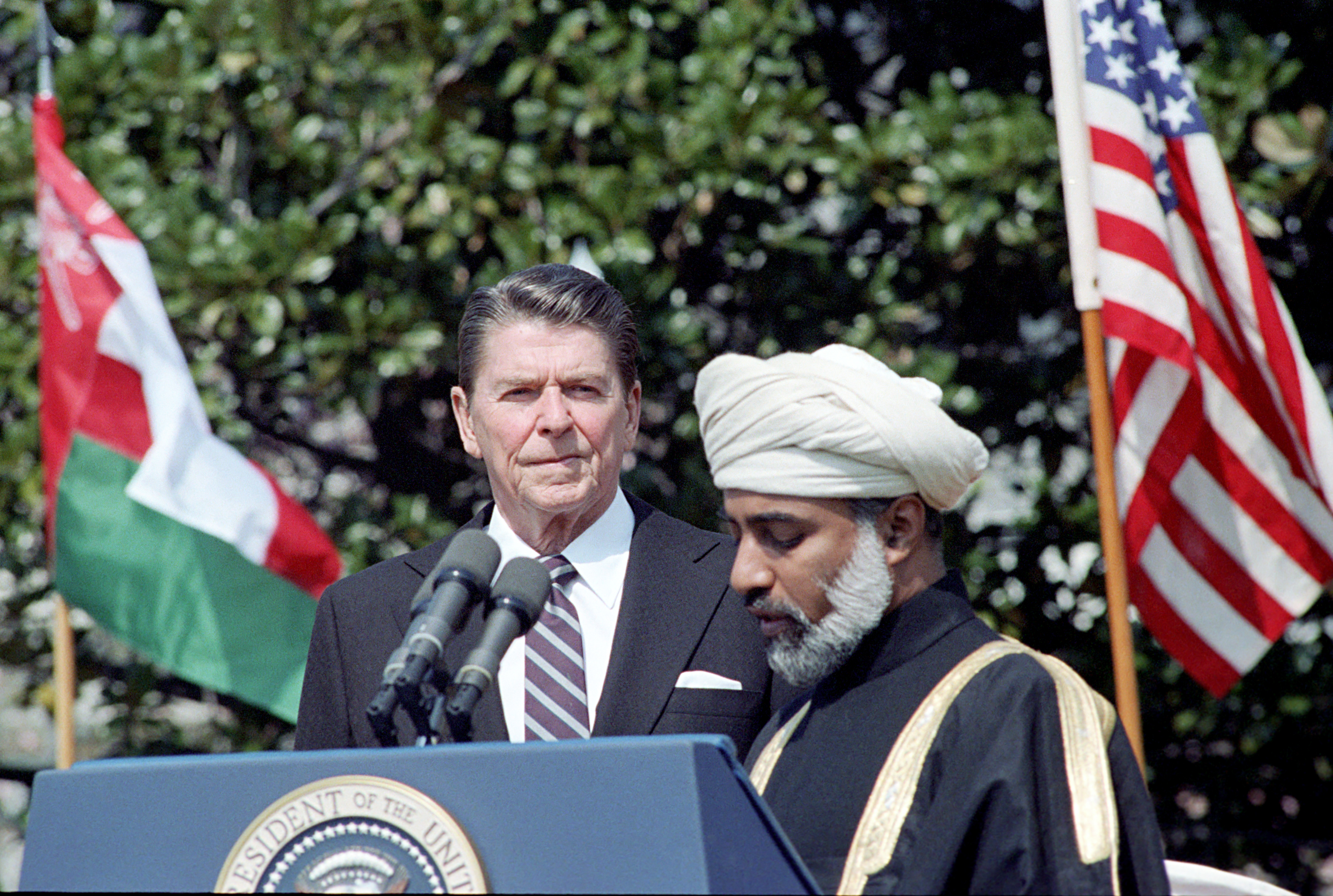
Ronald Reagan with Sultan Qaboos bin Said during a state visit in 1983

Qaboos acceded to the throne on 23 July 1970 following a successful coup against his father, with the aim of ending the country's isolation and using its oil revenue for modernization and development. He declared that the country would no longer be known as Muscat and Oman, but would change its name to "the Sultanate of Oman" in order to better reflect its political unity.

The coup was supported by the British, with Ian Cobain writing that it was "planned in London by MI6 and by civil servants at the Ministry of Defence and the Foreign Office" and sanctioned by the Prime Minister, Harold Wilson.

The first pressing problem that Qaboos bin Said faced as sultan was an armed communist insurgency from South Yemen, the Dhofar Rebellion (1962–1976). The sultanate eventually defeated the incursion with help from the Shah of Iran, Jordanian troops sent by his friend King Hussein of Jordan, British Special Forces and the Royal Air Force.

== Reign ==
When Qaboos took power, Oman was a poorly developed country, severely lacking in infrastructure, healthcare, and education, with only 10 km (6 mi) of paved roads and a population dependent on subsistence farming and fishing. Qaboos modernized the country using oil revenues. Schools and hospitals were built, and a modern infrastructure was laid down, with hundreds of kilometres of new roads paved, a telecommunications network established, projects for a port and airport that had begun prior to his reign were completed and a second port was built, and electrification was achieved. The government also began to search for new water resources and built a desalination plant, and the government encouraged the growth of private enterprise, especially in development projects. Banks, hotels, insurance companies, and print media began to appear as the country developed economically. The Omani riyal was established as the national currency, replacing the Indian rupee and Maria Theresa thaler. Later, additional ports were built, and universities were opened. In his first year in power, Qaboos also abolished slavery in Oman.

The political system which Qaboos established was an absolute monarchy. The Sultan's birthday, 18 November, was celebrated as Oman's national holiday, but has recently been changed to 20th November. The first day of his reign, 23 July, is celebrated as Renaissance Day.

Oman has no system of checks and balances, and thus no separation of powers. All power was concentrated in the Sultan during his reign, and he served as prime minister, minister of foreign affairs, minister of defence, chief of staff of the armed forces, and chairman of the board of the Central Bank of Oman. All legislation since 1970 has been promulgated through royal decrees, including the 1996 Basic Law. The sultan appoints judges, and can grant pardons and commute sentences. The sultan's authority is inviolable.

Qaboos's closest advisors were reportedly security and intelligence professionals within the Palace Office, headed by General Sultan bin Mohammed al Numani.

=== 2011 Omani protests ===
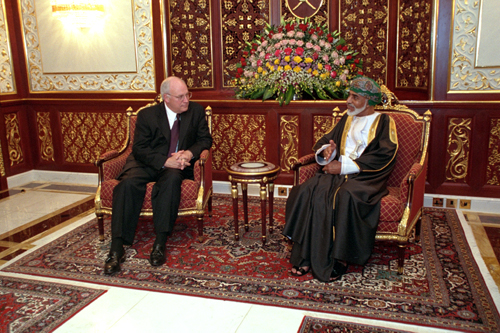
Sultan Qaboos meets with United States Vice President Dick Cheney during Cheney's visit to the Middle East in 2002.

The 2011 Omani protests were a series of protests in the Persian Gulf country of Oman that occurred as part of the revolutionary wave popularly known as the "Arab Spring". The protesters demanded salary increases, lower living costs, the creation of more jobs and a reduction in corruption. Protests in Sohar, Oman's fifth-largest city, centered on the Globe Roundabout. The Sultan's responses included the dismissal of a third of the governing cabinet.

According to CBS News, 19 June 2011,

Several protest leaders have been detained and released in rolling waves of arrests during the Arab Spring, and dissatisfaction with the state of affairs in the country is high. While disgruntlement amongst the populace is obvious, the extreme dearth of foreign press coverage and lack of general press freedom there leaves it unclear as to whether the protesters want the sultan to leave, or simply want their government to function better. Beyond the recent protests, there is concern about succession in the country, as there is no heir apparent or any clear legislation on who may be the next Sultan.

The Sultan did give token concession to protesters, yet detained social media activists. In August 2014, Mohammed Al-Fazari, an Omani writer, human rights defender, and the founder and editor-in-chief of the e-magazine Muwatin, was arrested and held incommunicado for six days, after which he was released without charge. A few months later he was stopped by authorities at Muscat International Airport and his passport and identity card were confiscated. The following year, despite a travel ban that the Omani authorities had imposed on him, al-Fazari left Oman and sought asylum in the United Kingdom.

=== Foreign policy ===
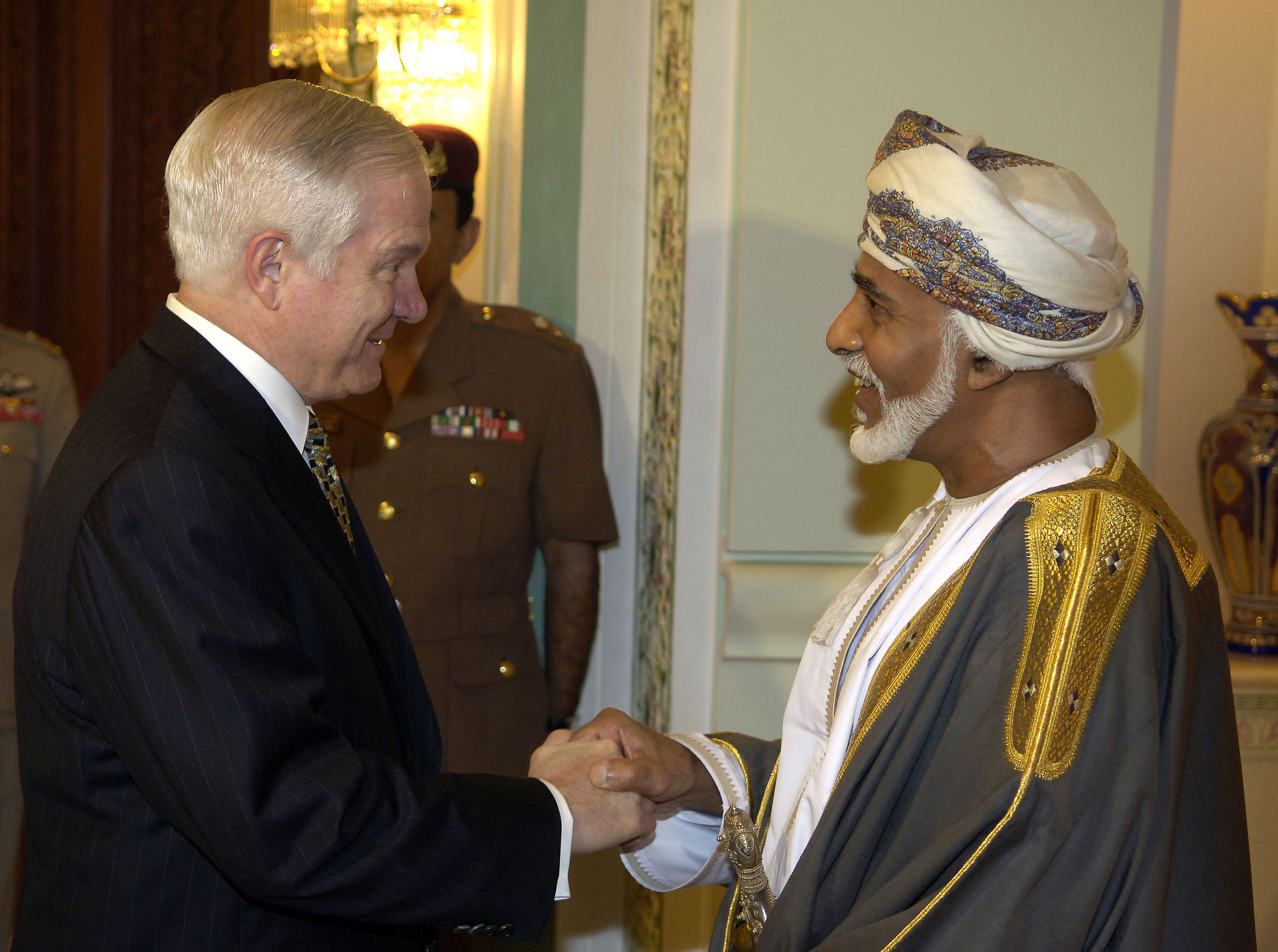
Sultan Qaboos welcomes U.S. Defense Secretary Robert Gates to Muscat, Oman, April 5, 2008.

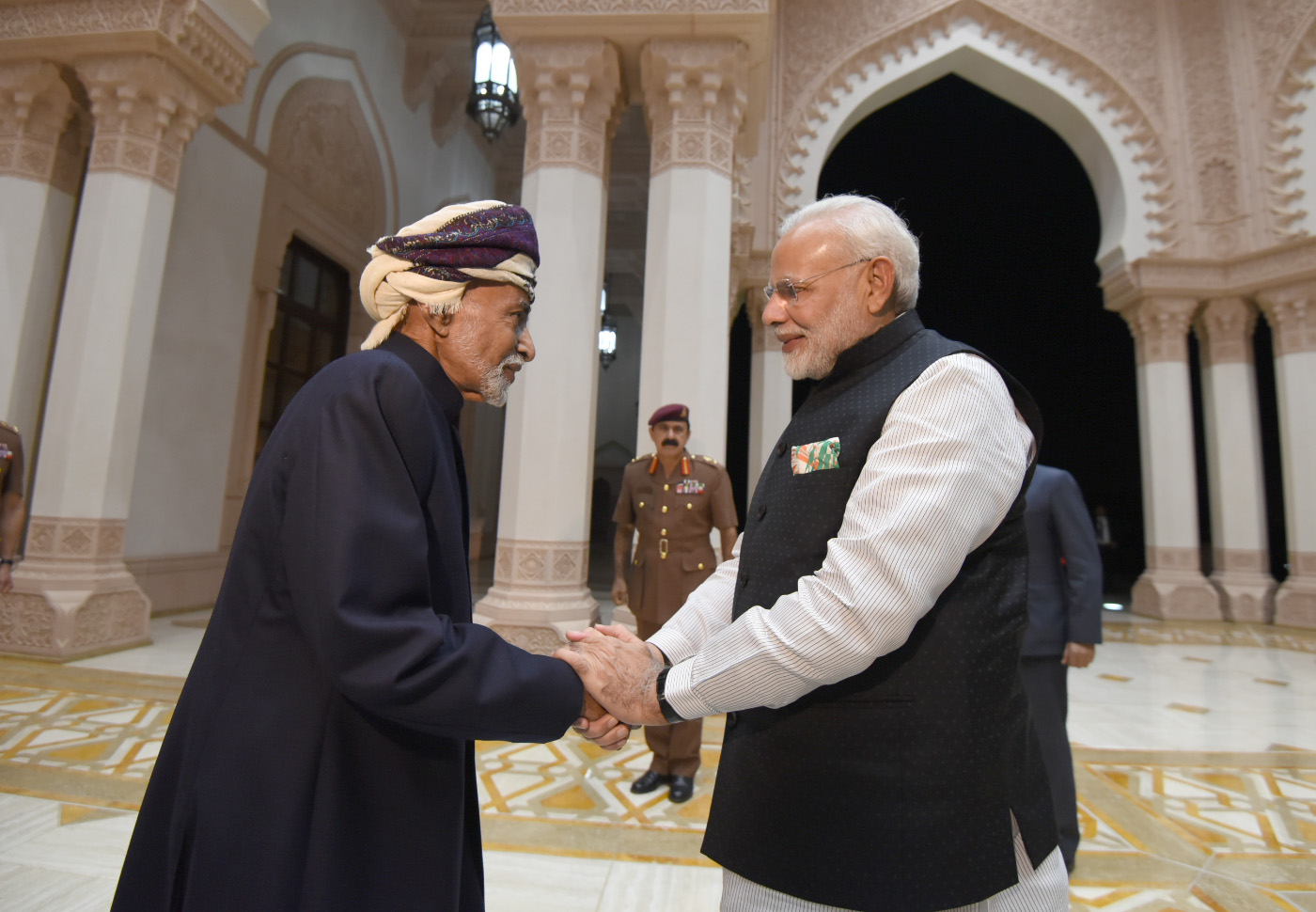
Indian Prime Minister Narendra Modi with Qaboos, 2018

Following the Iran–Iraq War, Qaboos declined to align himself against Iran. Before the 1994 Yemen war, he hosted the final meeting between rival leaders Ali Abdullah Saleh and Ali Salem al-Beidh to mediate.

Under Qaboos, Oman fostered closer ties with Iran than other Arab states of the Persian Gulf, and was careful to appear neutral and maintain a balance between the West and Iran. As a result, Oman often acted as an intermediary between the United States and Iran. Qaboos helped mediate secret US–Iran talks in 2013 that paved the way to the Joint Comprehensive Plan of Action two years later.

In 2011, Qaboos facilitated the release of American hikers who were held by Iran, paying $1 million for their freedom.

Oman did not join the Saudi Arabian-led intervention in Yemen against the Houthis in 2015. Talks between the Houthis and Saudi Arabia took place in Muscat in early 2016. Oman did not take sides in a Persian Gulf dispute that saw Saudi Arabia and its allies impose an embargo on Qatar in 2017.

In October 2018, Qaboos invited Prime Minister of Israel Benjamin Netanyahu to visit Oman, despite his country not having official diplomatic ties with Israel. Netanyahu was the first Israeli prime minister to visit Oman since Shimon Peres in 1996.

In 2018 he prohibited GCC nationals from owning property in governorates bordering Saudi Arabia and the UAE.

== Philanthropy ==
Qaboos financed the construction or maintenance of a number of mosques, notably the Sultan Qaboos Grand Mosque, as well as the holy places of other religions.

Through a donation to UNESCO in the early 1990s, Qaboos funded the Sultan Qaboos Prize for Environmental Preservation, to afford recognition to outstanding contributions in the management or preservation of the environment. The prize has been awarded biannually since 1991.

== Personal life ==
Qaboos was a Muslim of the Ibadi denomination, which has traditionally ruled Oman. Although Oman is predominantly Muslim, the Sultan granted freedom of religion in the country and financed the construction of four Catholic and Protestant churches in the country as well as several Hindu temples.

The Sultan was an avid fan and promoter of classical music. His 120-member orchestra consists entirely of young Omanis who, since 1986, audition as children and grow up as members of the symphonic ensemble. They play locally and traveled abroad with the Sultan. Argentine composer Lalo Schifrin was commissioned to compose a work entitled Symphonic Impressions of Oman. Qaboos was particularly enthusiastic about the pipe organ. The Royal Opera House Muscat features the second largest mobile pipe organ in the world, which has three specially made organ stops, named the "Royal Solo" in his honour. He was also a patron of local folk musician Salim Rashid Suri, whom he made a cultural consultant.

On 22 March 1976, Qaboos married his first cousin Sayyida Nawwal bint Tariq Al Said (born 1951), the daughter of his uncle Sayyid Tariq bin Taimur and Sayyida Shawana bint Nasir Al Busaidiyah. Nawwal was renamed Kamila at the time of her marriage and is the half-sister of Qaboos's successor, Haitham bin Tariq. The marriage ended in divorce in 1979 and produced no children.

In September 1995, Qaboos was involved in a car accident in Salalah just outside his palace, which killed one of his most prominent and influential ministers, the deputy prime minister for finance and economy, Qais Bin Abdul Munim Al Zawawi.

Qaboos owned several yachts administered by the Oman Royal Yacht Squadron, including Al Said and Fulk Al Salamah, two of the world's largest yachts.

Qaboos was widely believed by Omanis and Gulf Arabs to be homosexual. Qaboos's obituary in The Times described rumours throughout his life of "liaisons with elegant young European men". Queer News wrote that Qaboos "lived almost as an openly gay man".

== Illness and death ==
Qaboos had suffered from colon cancer since 2014, for which he received treatment. On 14 December 2019, he was reported to be terminally ill from the disease after being admitted to the UZ Leuven hospital in Belgium, and opted to return home because he wanted to die in his own country. He died on 10 January 2020 at the age of 79.

Following his death, the royal court declared three days of national mourning and halted all public and private official business for the same period, announcing the national flag would be flown at half-mast for a period of 40 days. Kuwait, Saudi Arabia, Qatar, the United Arab Emirates, Bahrain, Jordan, Lebanon, and Egypt all declared three days of mourning; India and Bangladesh declared one day of mourning. The United Kingdom lowered flags to half-mast as a sign of respect, and Prime Minister Boris Johnson described Qaboos as a "father of the nation", and "an exceptionally wise and respected leader" who "sought to improve the lives of the Omani people" and contributed to the country's development "into a stable and prosperous nation".

== Succession ==
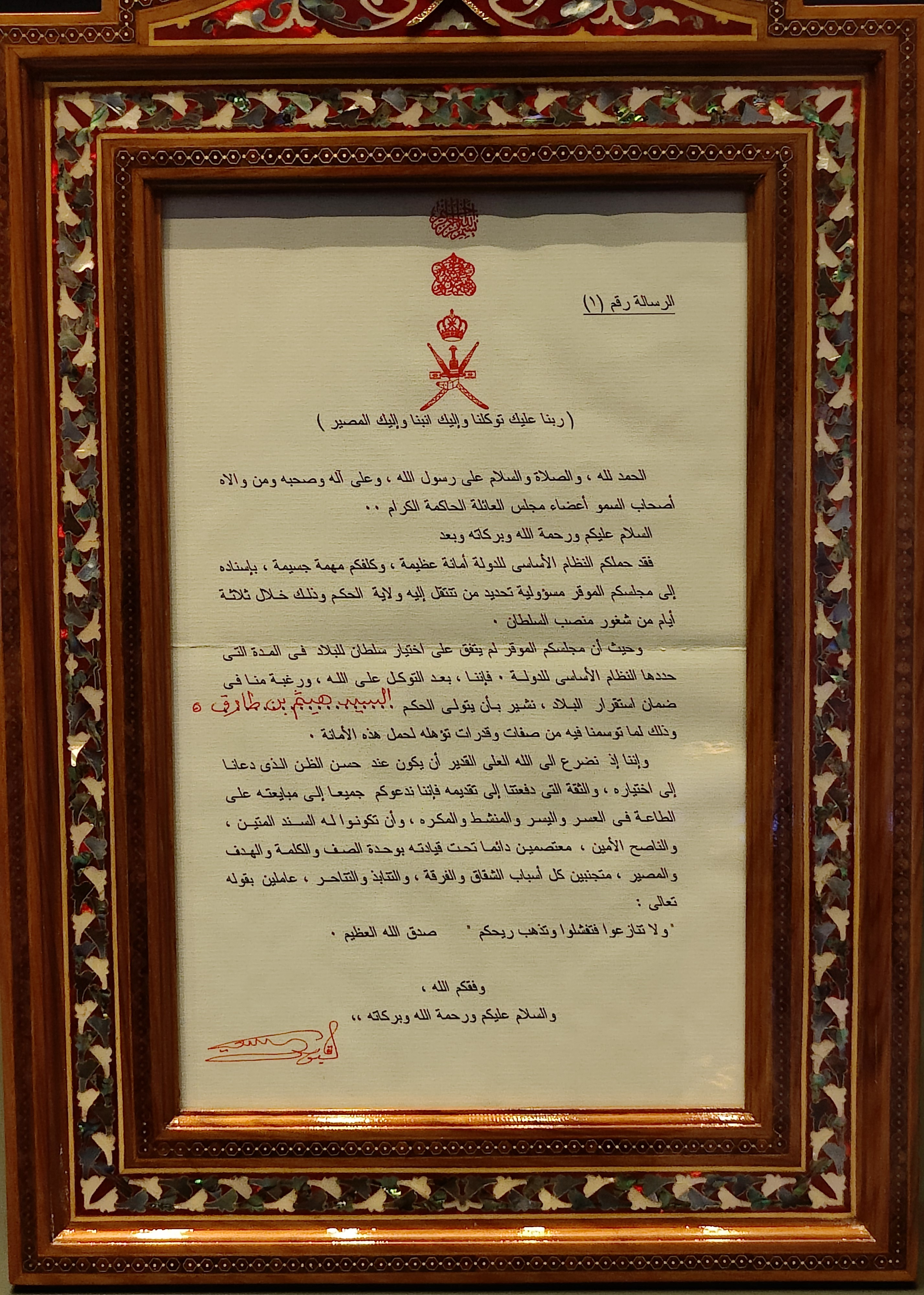
The will of Sultan Qaboos, in which he named his cousin Haitham bin Tariq his heir

Unlike the heads of other Arab states of the Persian Gulf, Qaboos did not publicly name an heir. Article 6 of the constitution says the Royal Family Council has three days to choose a new sultan from the date the position falls vacant. If the Royal Family Council fails to agree, a letter containing a name penned by Sultan Qaboos should be opened in the presence of the Defence Council of military and security officials, supreme court chiefs, and heads of the upper and lower houses of the consultative assemblies. Analysts saw the rules as an elaborate means of Qaboos securing his choice for successor without causing controversy by making it public during his lifetime, since it was considered unlikely that the royal family would be able to agree on a successor on its own.

Qaboos had no children, and only one sister, Sayyida Umaima (who predeceased him in 2002), but no male siblings; there are other male members of the Omani royal family including paternal uncles and their families. Using same-generation primogeniture, the successor to Qaboos would appear to be the children of his late uncle Sayyid Tariq bin Taimur, Oman's first prime minister and the Sultan's former father-in-law. Oman watchers believed the top contenders to succeed Qaboos were three of Tariq's sons: Asa'ad bin Tariq, Deputy Prime Minister for International Relations and Cooperation and the Sultan's special representative; Shihab bin Tariq, a retired commander of the Royal Navy of Oman; and Haitham bin Tariq, Minister of Heritage and National Culture.

On 11 January 2020, Oman state TV said the Royal Family Council, in a letter to the Defense Council, had decided to defer to the choice that Qaboos named in his will, and thus had opened the letter by Qaboos naming his successor, announcing shortly that Haitham bin Tariq is the country's ruling sultan. Haitham has two sons and two daughters.

== Legacy ==
Following Qaboos's death, international figures and institutions highlighted his role in Oman's development and foreign policy. In a joint statement, the president of the European Council, the president of the European Commission, and the High Representative said that Oman had entered "an unprecedented era of reforms" under his leadership, improving living standards, and that his foreign policy had placed Oman among the European Union's closest partners in a conflict-affected region.

Queen Elizabeth II stated that Qaboos's "devotion to Oman, to its development and to the care of his people was an inspiration", and said he would be remembered for "wise leadership" and his "commitment to peace and understanding between nations and between faiths".

Former United States president George W. Bush described him as "a stable force in the Middle East and a strong U.S. ally", adding that he had pursued "a modern, prosperous, and peaceful Oman".

Former British prime minister Tony Blair described Qaboos as "a man of extraordinary humanity" and wrote that he had encouraged tourism, improved infrastructure, expanded education and health facilities, and sought to protect Oman's independence so that it could act as a mediator and peacemaker. Blair also wrote that Qaboos "did not seek the leadership of his country through personal ambition", but because he believed Oman's future was being limited by "outdated thinking" and a "narrow view of the world". The Tony Blair Institute also described him as "a leader of vision and purpose" who raised Oman to "an entirely new level of development and prosperity".

The United Nations General Assembly held a tribute meeting following his death.

In June 2022, his Service Medal of the Order of St John was ceremonially consecrated in London.

== Awards and decorations ==
Styles of Sultan Qaboos bin Said Al Said
- Reference style: His Majesty
- Spoken style: Your Majesty

=== National honours ===
Oman:

- Civilian
  - Grand Master of the Order of Al Said
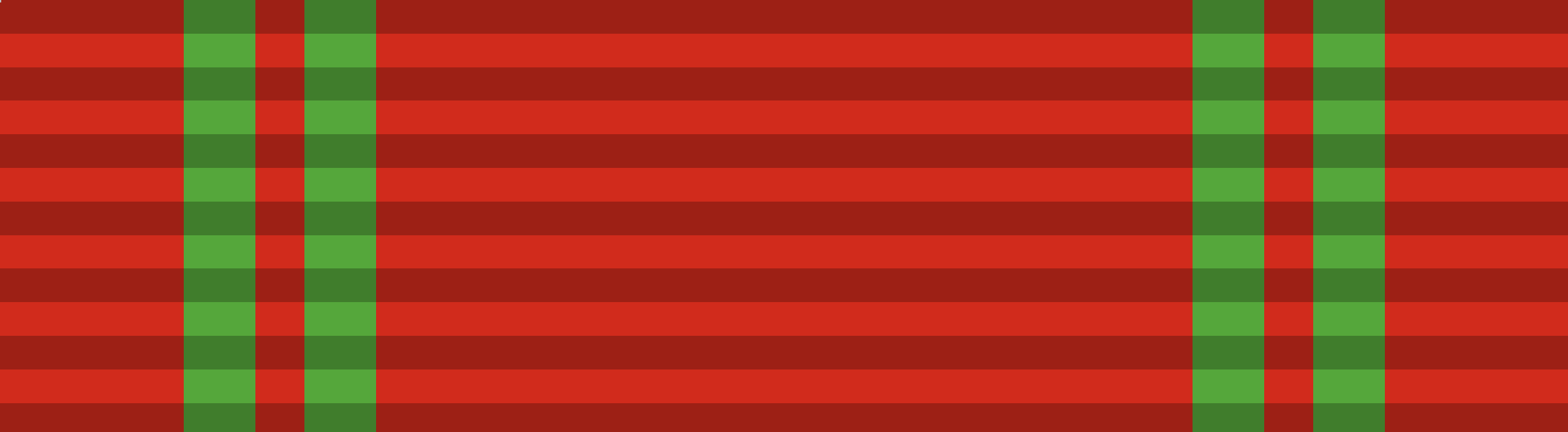
  - Grand Master of the Civil Order of Oman
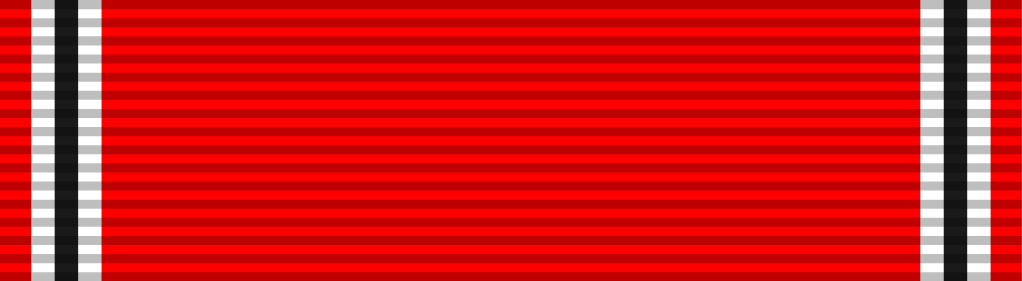
  - Grand Master of the Order of Establishment
  - Grand Master of the Order of Sultan Qaboos
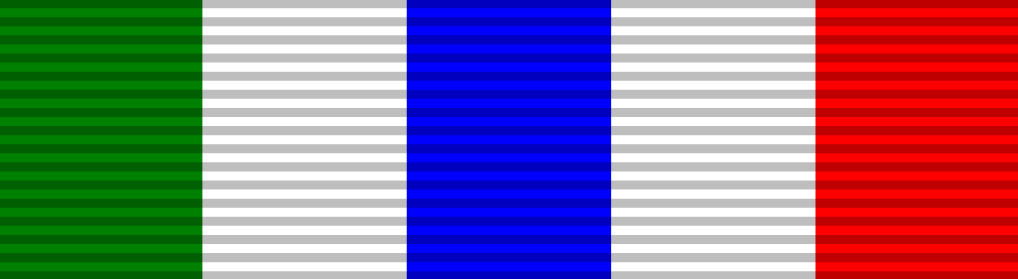
  - Grand Master of the Order of Royal Commendation
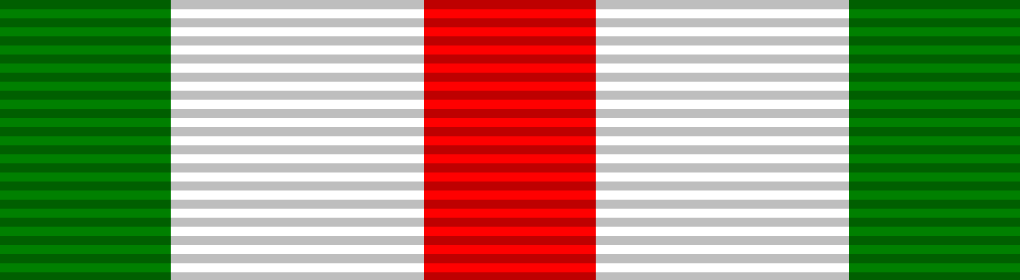
  - Grand Master of the Order of His Majesty Sultan Qaboos bin Said
  - Grand Master of the Order of the Renaissance
  - Grand Master of the Grand Order of the Renaissance
  - Grand Master of the Grand Order of Honour
  - Grand Master of the Order of Merit
  - Grand Master of the Order of Al Nu'man
  - Grand Master of the Order of Honour
  - Grand Master of the Order of Excellence
  - Grand Master of the Sultan Qaboos Order for Culture, Science and Art
  - Grand Master of the Order of Merit for Culture, Science, Arts, and Literature
  - Grand Master of the Order of Appreciation for Good Civil Service
- Military
  - Grand Master of the Military Order of Oman
  - Grand Master of the Order of the Special Royal Emblem
  - Grand Master of the Military Order of Achievement
  - Grand Master of the Military Order of Merit

=== Foreign honours ===
- Austria:
  - Grand Star of the Decoration of Honour for Services to the Republic of Austria (31 March 2001)
- Bahrain:
  - Member 1st Class of the Order of Al Khalifa
- Brunei:
  - Member of the Royal Family Order of the Crown of Brunei (15 December 1984)
- Egypt:
  - Grand Collar of the Order of the Nile (1976)
- France:
  - Grand Cross of the Legion of Honour (31 May 1989)
- Germany:
  - Grand Cross Special Class of the Order of Merit of the Federal Republic of Germany
- India:
  - Jawaharlal Nehru Award for International Understanding (2004 – award yet to be presented)
  - Gandhi Peace Prize (03/2021), Delhi
- Indonesia:
  - Recipient of the Star of the Republic of Indonesia, 1st Class or Adipurna
- Iran:
  - Grand Collar of the Order of Pahlavi (3 March 1974)
  - Recipient of the Commemorative Medal of the 2500th Anniversary of the founding of the Persian Empire (14 October 1971)
- Italy:
  - Knight Grand Cross with Collar of the Order of Merit of the Italian Republic (22 April 1974)
- Japan:
  - Grand Cordon of the Order of the Chrysanthemum
- Jordan:
  - Collar of the Order of al-Hussein bin Ali
- Kuwait:
  - Collar of the Order of Mubarak the Great (28 December 2009)
- Lebanon:
  - Extraordinary Grade of the Order of Merit
- Malaysia:
  - Honorary Recipient of the Order of the Crown of the Realm (DMN) (1991)
- Morocco:
  - Grand Cross of the Order of Ouissam Alaouite
  - Collar of the Order of the Throne
- Netherlands:
  - Knight Grand Cross of the Order of the Netherlands Lion (2012)
- Pakistan:
  - Recipient of the Nishan-e-Pakistan, 1st Class
- Qatar:
  - Collar of the Order of the Independence
- Saudi Arabia:
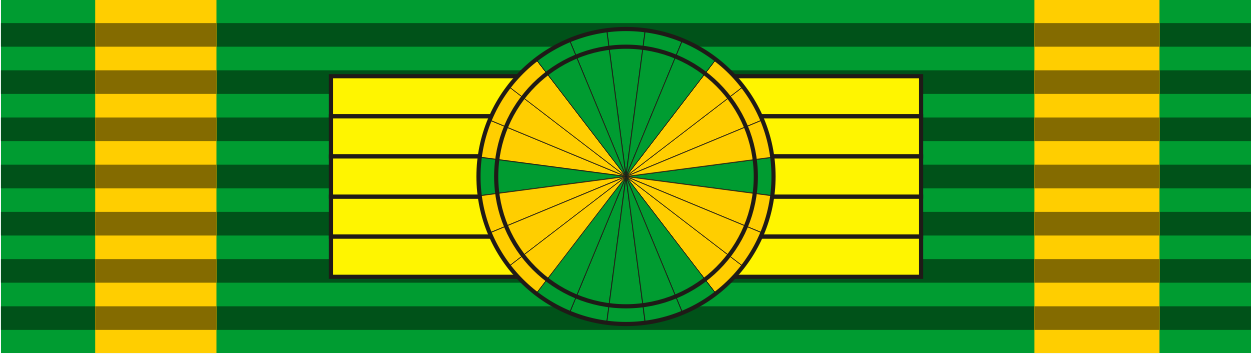
  - Collar of the Order of Abdulaziz al Saud (23 December 2006)
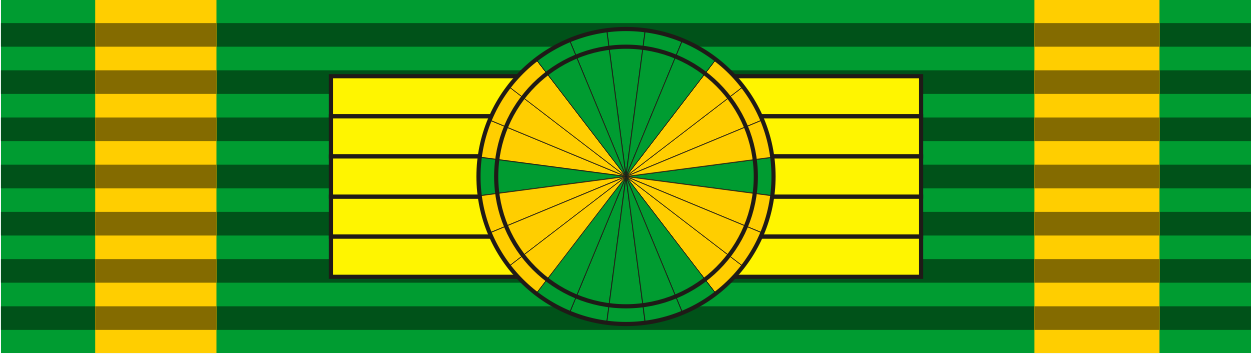
  - Decoration 1st Class of the Order of Abdulaziz al Saud (23 December 2006)
  - Recipient of the Badr Chain
- Singapore:
  - Member 1st Class of the Order of Temasek (12 March 2009)
- South Africa:
  - Grand Cross of the Order of Good Hope (1999)
- Spain:
  - Knight of the Collar of the Order of Isabella the Catholic (13 December 1985)
  - Grand Cross of the Order of Civil Merit
- Syria:
  - Collar of the Order of Umayyad
- Tunisia:
  - Grand Cordon of the Order of the Republic
  - Collar of the Order of Independence
- United Arab Emirates:
  - Collar of the Order of the Federation
- United Kingdom:
  - Honorary Knight Grand Cross of the Order of the Bath (GCB) (18 March 1982)
  - Honorary Knight Grand Cross of the Order of St Michael and St George (GCMG) (8 July 1976)
  - Recipient of the Royal Victorian Chain (27 November 2010)
  - Honorary Knight Grand Cross of the Royal Victorian Order (GCVO) (28 February 1979)
  - Associate Bailiff Grand Cross of the Most Venerable Order of Saint John (GCStJ) (19 March 1984)
  - Associate Knight of Justice of the Most Venerable Order of Saint John (KStJ) (8 November 1976)

== Palace ==
Name	City	Area	Coordinates	Features
Al Alam Palace	Muscat	2.0 km^{2} (0.77 sq mi)	23°36′52.86″N 58°35′43.90″E	

== See also ==
- List of longest-reigning monarchs
- Royal Guard of Oman

Qaboos bin Said House of Al Said Born: 18 November 1940 Died: 10 January 2020
Regnal titles
Preceded by Said bin Taimur	Sultan of Oman; 1970–2020	Succeeded by Haitham bin Tariq
