= Al Bu Said dynasty =

Ruling dynasty of the Sultanate of Oman and Zanzibar

Al Bu Said آل بوسعيد Al Said
- Royal house
- Royal emblem of Oman

- Royal standard of Oman
- Parent family: Banu Qahtan; Azd; Muhallabids
- Country: Oman (current); Historical: Omani Empire; Sultanate of Muscat and Oman; Sultanate of Zanzibar
- Founded: November 20, 1744; 282 years ago
- Founder: Ahmad bin Said (died 1783)
- Current head: Sultan Haitham bin Tariq Al Said
- Seat: Al Alam Palace
- Titles: Sultan of Oman (1970–present); Sultan of Zanzibar (1856–1964); Sultan of Muscat and Oman (1856–1970); Sultan of the Omani Empire (1791–1856; Imam of Oman (1749–1791) Crown Prince of Oman; Sayyid with surname Al Said for men; Sayyida with the surname Al Saidiyyah for women
- Styles: His/Her Highness; His/Her Majesty
- Connected families: Banu Lahab
- Traditions: Ibadi Islam
- Properties: Al Alam Palace; Al Baraka Palace; Al Maamoura Palace; Al Shomoukh Palace
- Cadet branches: Royal Family of Zanzibar
- Website: www.omaninfo.om www.zanzibarroyalfamily.org

The House of Al Bu Said (Arabic: آل بوسعيد, romanized: Āl Bū Saʿīd, Arabic pronunciation: [aːl buː sa.ʕiːd]), is the ruling royal family of Oman and the former ruling house of the Omani Empire (1744–1856), Sultanate of Muscat and Oman (1856–1970) and the Sultanate of Zanzibar (1856–1964). It is composed of the descendants of Ahmad bin Said Al Busaidi, who founded the dynasty in 1744. The House is currently headed by Haitham bin Tariq Al Said, the Sultan of Oman, who is the head of state and absolute monarch of Oman. The Sultan is also head of government in his capacity as Prime Minister.

== Title ==
The name Al Bu Said is an Arabic dynastic name formed from ʾĀl (آل), (meaning "family of" or "House of" and Bū Saʿīd, to the personal name of an ancestor. In the case of the Al Bu Said, the ancestor is Al Muhallab ibn Abi Suffrah, whose kunya was Abu Said.

The descendants of Said bin Sultan, who ruled from 1806 to 1856, form the main Omani ruling line and use Al Said (آل سعيد) as their family name, while any descendants of Ahmad bin Said Al Busaidi use Al Busaidi.

== History ==
The Busaid dynasty traces its roots to the tribes of Azd through a patrilineal ancestor, al-'Atik b. al-Asad b. Imran, who settled in Dibba (Dabá), hence the band was also known as the "Azd of Daba". Like other Qahtani, the Azd originally hailed from Yemen and migrated north after the destruction of the Marib Dam.

With the rise of Islam, the Azd established themselves into a leading force in the ensuing Muslim conquests and later in the realms of the Umayyad Caliphate through the celebrated general Al Muhallab ibn Abi Suffrah (Abu Said), the progenitor of the Busaid tribe. Most early sections of pre-Islamic universal chronicles of Arabs begin with the Azd.

=== Rise to power ===
Ahmad bin Said Al Busaidi, a shrewd military tactician, was the governor of Sohar during the Omani Civil War when a Persian fleet attacked the town. He held out for nine months, finally forcing the Persian commander of Nader Shah's army to come to terms and leave the country altogether within a few years. He was elected imam on 20 November 1744, marking the last time Oman was occupied by foreign parties and the beginning of a new unified state. It was also the start of a dynasty that has lasted to the present day, making it one of the oldest surviving royal dynasties in Arabia and the first to gain independence.

His descendants did not take the religious title of Imam, but Sayyid, an honorific title held by members of the royal family to this day, thus relinquishing all pretense of spiritual authority while fostering Muslim scholars and promoting Islamic scholarship.

Trade flourished during Ahmed's thirty-nine-year reign and the Omani navy developed into a formidable force in the Indian Ocean second only to Great Britain and capable of purging Persians forces from the entire region and protecting Ottoman vessels in the Gulf of Oman, Indian Ocean and the Pirate Coast of Trucial Oman.

When he died in 1778, the ulema replaced Ahmed with his son, Said bin Ahmed, who was very religious but shrank from administrative duties. Since the tenets of Ibadhism allowed for the division of duties between leaders along religious, administrative and military lines, he removed himself to Rustaq until his death in 1811.

His son Hamad bin Said moved the capital from the interior city of Rustaq to the coastal Muscat in 1783 and took the title of sultan, implying purely coercive power. He was a capable leader for eight years and facilitated reform policy in the initial stages of the transition but died suddenly in 1792 of smallpox.

=== Alliance with the British Empire ===
Sultan bin Ahmed assumed control of the government after the death of his nephew and strengthened the already powerful fleet by adding numerous gunships and sleek cargo vessels. He also needed a strong ally to help him regain control of Mombasa from the Mazrui clan, fight off the movement spreading from what is now Saudi Arabia and to keep the Qasimi tribes from the Persian city of Lingeh out of Oman. He found this able ally in Great Britain, who by this time was a powerful maritime nation with an empire expanding all over the world. In the late 18th century, the second British Empire was at war with France and knew that the French emperor, Napoleon Bonaparte, was planning to march through Persia and capture Muscat on his way to invade India. In 1798 Britain and Oman agreed a Treaty of Commerce and Navigation.

Sultan bin Ahmed pledged himself to British interests in India, and his territories became out of bounds to the French. He allowed the British East India Company to establish the first trading station in the Persian Gulf, and a British consul was posted to Muscat. As well as defeating Bonaparte, the British had another motive for the treaty with Oman: they wanted to put pressure on the sultan to end slavery, which had been declared illegal in England in 1772. At this time, the trade from Africa to Oman was still buoyant, and Zanzibar's position as an important trade centre was bolstered further when the supply of ivory from Mozambique to India collapsed because of excessive Portuguese export duties. The traders simply shipped their ivory through Zanzibar instead. Omani warships were in constant skirmishes up and down the gulf, which kept the sultan preoccupied. It was in the course of one of his sorties during an incursion abroad a ship in the Persian Gulf in 1804 that Sultan Sayyid was shot in the head by a stray bullet, he was buried in Lingeh.

=== Said bin Sultan (Said the Great) ===
Said bin Sultan

The death of Sultan bin Ahmed sent the country into a state of shock and inter-family rivalries. Dissident tribes and outside agitators who all conspired to make the role of supreme commander a speculative proposition at best. Sultan's eldest son Said was merely thirteen, too young to take the reins of his country, "so the elders called upon another nephew Badr bin Saif to act as regent in the boy's behalf until he came of age."

The decision to enlist Badr was unfortunately a bad one, as he had political aspirations of his own. The royal house turned against him but he refused to relinquish his hold of power without a struggle. Said, now sixteen, conspired to have him assassinated. On a pretext to inspect the munitions at Nakhal Fort, Badr went to Barka and met Said at Bait al Nu'man castle. There he was killed in a dramatic duel to the death with daggers. A wounded Badr escaped but was finished off by Said's horsemen. Said immediately assumed the government and held it until his death fifty-two years later. He announced to the British that he had assumed power, but they were slow to respond. They acknowledged the young monarch a year later when they realized that their fortunes were best served by courting him.

During the reign of the renowned Sultan Said bin Sultan, the progenitor of the Busaidi dynasty, he took Oman to its zenith as a commercial and political maritime power: extending its borders to include Mombasa and parts of the Southeast African coast, Zanzibar, Pemba Island, Mafia Island, Lamu Archipelago, Cape Delgado (northern border of the current Mozambique), Bandar-Abbas and the southern Iranian coast, Gwadar province of Balochistan (bought by Pakistan in 1958) and, for a short time Bahrain. He was counted among the best leaders as his reputation spread to the crown heads of Europe and became known as Said the Great. Few Arab leaders of any time were as well known and respected as Sheikh Said. Trade flourished and Muscat became a key market for the Persian Gulf. The celebrated explorer Richard Francis Burton called him "as shrewd, liberal and enlightened a prince as Arabia has ever produced," and an Italian physician who served him for a time said: "His constant love of justice, and distinguished clemency, the effects of which are felt, not only by his own subjects, but even by his domestic slaves."

In 1832, he made the island of Zanzibar his second capital and set about establishing what is present-day Stone Town. A merchant prince and capable warrior, he spent much of his time at sea depending on mercantile and maritime resources for his power in both Oman and Zanzibar. Recognizing the suitability of Zanzibar climate and soil, he initiated large scale cultivation of cloves (an essential meat preservative in Europe prior to the advent of refrigeration) and soon after sought slaves as cheap labor to plant and harvest the biennial crop. He is also noted for revitalizing the production of rice and sugar cane as well as the export of ivory and gum copal. Such was his enterprise and commercial skill that it could probably be said that he established the first international market on the island of Zanzibar; subsequently many countries signed commercial treaties and opened consulates. He even introduced a copper coinage to amplify the existing silver coinage of Maria Theresa thalers and Spanish dollars.

==== Treaty with the United States ====
On 21 September 1833 a historical treaty of friendship and trade was signed with the United States of America. It was the second trade treaty formulated by the U.S. and an Arab state (Morocco being the first in 1820). The United States and Oman both stood to benefit, as the U.S. – unlike Britain and France – had no territorial ambitions in the Middle East and was solely interested in commerce. On 13 April 1840, the ship Al-Sultanah docked at New York, making it the first Arab envoy to ever visit the New World. Her crew of fifty-six Arab sailors caused a flurry of excitement among the three hundred thousand residents of that thriving metropolis. Al-Sultanah carried ivory, Persian rugs, spices, coffee and dates, as well as lavish gifts for President Martin Van Buren. The visit of Al-Sultanah lasted nearly four months, in which time the emissary, Ahmed Bin Na'aman Al-Kaabi (whose portrait can still be seen in the Oman and Zanzibar display of the Peabody Museum in Massachusetts) and his officers were entertained by state and city dignitaries. They received resolutions passed by official bodies, were given tours of New York City and saw sections which would, a few decades later, become colonies of Arabic-speaking immigrants. Among Bin Na'aman's hosts was Commodore Cornelius Vanderbilt, in whose home he met Governor William H. Seward and Vice President Richard Mentor Johnson. The visit of Ahmed Bin Na'aman to America was a happy one, and when he prepared to leave, the United States completely repaired Al-Sultanah and presented him with gifts for his Sultan.

==== End of Said's reign ====
Said made periodic visits to Muscat, leaving his eldest son Khalid as Governor of Zanzibar in his absence. Khalid had a predilection for French goods and named his principal country estate Marseilles, after the Mediterranean port Marseille. When Khalid died of tuberculosis in November 1854, an order came from Said in Muscat appointing another son, the 20-year-old Majid, as governor.

In September 1856, Said sailed for Zanzibar on his ship Kitorie in the company of his nineteen-year-old son, Barghash bin Said. He began to suffer severe pains from an old battle wound in his thigh followed by an attack of dysentery. He died on board the ship on 19 October 1856 at the age of sixty-five.

=== Division of Zanzibar and Oman ===
Schisms within the ruling family were apparent after the death of Sultan Said bin Sultan as his sons, who had their own rivalries and ambitions for controlling the throne, quarrelled over the empire. Realizing that Majid would be unaware of their father's death, Bargash came ashore secretly and tried to take control of the palace at Mtoni and the fort in Zanzibar town, but he was unable to muster enough supporters and his attempt was thwarted.

On 28 October 1856, Majid proclaimed himself Sultan of Zanzibar. A ship was sent to Oman with the news, but Said's elder son Thuwaini, who was appointed heir apparent on 23 July 1844 and had long acted as his father's Governor in Muscat and commander-in-chief of the Saidi forces, refused to acknowledge Majid and immediately tried to regain Zanzibar by force of arms. As a direct result of this struggle, the government of British India, concerned with the stability in the area, acted as arbitrator in the dispute. The Governor-General of British India, Lord Canning ruled in his arbitration that the empire was to be divided into two separate sultanates: the Sultanate of Zanzibar with its dependencies to Majid bin Said, Said's former Governor of the Southeast African dominions, and the Sultanate of Muscat and Oman to Thuwaini bin Said. On 10 March 1862, the Zanzibar Guarantee Treaty was signed in Paris by Britain and France, whereby both parties agreed to respect the independence of the Sultan of Oman and the Sultan of Zanzibar. Recognizing the economic loss caused to Oman by the severance of the Zanzibar connection, Thuwaini insisted Majid pay 40,000 Maria Theresa thalers annually as compensation but the payment fell into arrears and ceased a year later.

=== Recent history ===
State rule shifted consecutively in Zanzibar from the hands of the heirless Majid to three of his brothers until the Zanzibar revolution of 1964, led by the island's black African citizens. The revolutionaries overthrew of the last Sultan of Zanzibar, Jamshid bin Abdullah. Zanzibar became a Marxist republic overnight, the clove industry was nationalised and the Sultan's Hospital was consequently renamed the Vladmir Illych Lenin Hospital (now known by the politically neutral name of the Coconut Palm Infirmary).

Jamshid and his family fled to England in 1964 and settled into exile in a modest home in Portsmouth, England. He was pardoned by Zanzibar President Salmin Amour on the 46th anniversary of the 1964 uprising and declared free to return as an ordinary Omani citizen, but remained barred from settling in Oman until 2020 after being exiled for more than 50 years.

In 1868, the royal house in Oman took a brief turn through a distant line of the family when Imam Azzan bin Qais started rebelling against Thuwaini bin Said with the help and encouragement of the Wahhabis in 1864. Azzan eventually managed to expel Thuwaini's eldest son Salim bin Thuwaini, seizing power in October 1868. Under Azzan, the country briefly reverted to being an imamate, rather than a sultanate. Although he was accepted by a significant portion of the Al Hinai tribe, his subsequent attempts to subdue the interior alienated the Ghafiri tribe, who in 1870 instigated a general revolt led by Salim's uncle Sayyid Turki bin Said.

Turki contrived to keep the office within the immediate family and re-establish his father's sultanate; having secured the political and financial backing of the British, he managed to execute Azzan, bringing the revolt to a successful end in January 1871. Succession continued through his great-grandson, Sultan Qaboos bin Said, who rose to power by overthrowing his father, Said bin Taimur, in a palace coup in 1970. Qaboos died on 10 January 2020 after 50 years in power. He was replaced by his cousin, Haitham bin Tariq Al Said, after a letter, written by Qaboos himself, designated Haitham as his chosen successor.

== Royal titles ==
=== Crown Prince ===
In 2021, Sultan Haitham bin Tariq created the position and title of Crown Prince of Oman by Royal Decree. The first Crown Prince is his oldest son, Theyazin bin Haitham.

=== Sayyid ===
In Oman, Sayyid is used solely as a royal title and not as a means of indicating descent from Muhammad like in other parts of the world. All male line descendants of Sultan Said bin Sultan, the first ruler of Oman from the Al Said Dynasty, are able to use the title of Sayyid or Sayyida. Male line descendants of Sultan Turki bin Said are also able to use the style of His/Her Highness. The Sayyid title in Oman is some times translated as Prince.

== List of rulers ==
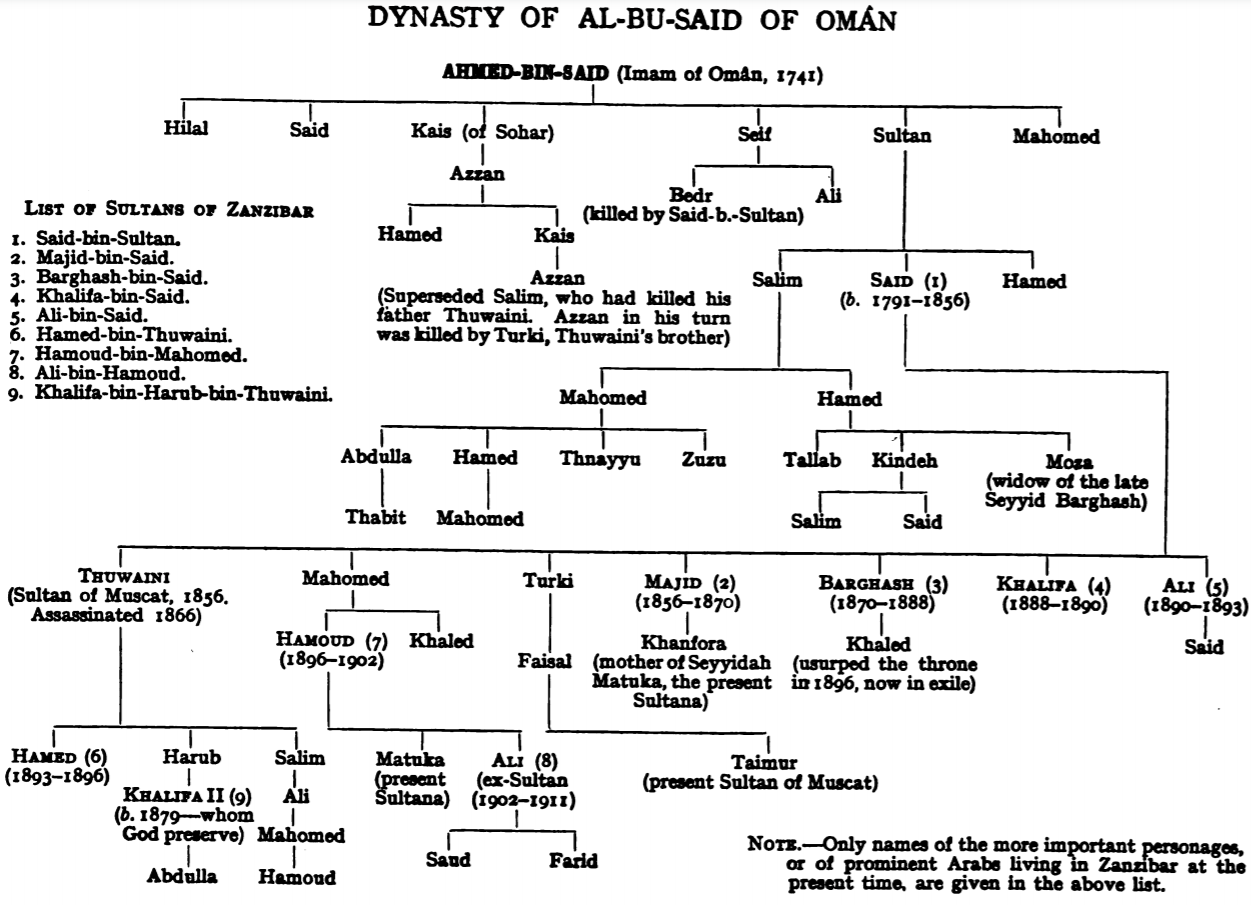
Dynastic chart of Al-Bu-Said of Oman

=== Imams of Oman ===
- 1744–1778 Imam Ahmed bin Said
- 1778–1783 Imam Said bin Ahmed

=== Sultans of Oman ===
- 1783–1792 Sultan Hamad bin Said
- 1792–1804 Sultan Sultan bin Ahmed
- 1804–1806 Sultan Salim bin Sultan
- 1804–1856 Sultan Said bin Sultan
- 1856–1866 Sultan Thuwaini bin Said
- 1866–1868 Sultan Salim bin Thuwaini
- 1868–1871 Imam Azzan bin Qais
- 1871–1888 Sultan Turki bin Said
- 1888–1913 Sultan Faisal bin Turki
- 1913–1932 Sultan Taimur bin Faisal
- 1932–1970 Sultan Said bin Taimur
- 1970–2020 Sultan Qaboos bin Said
- 2020–present Sultan Haitham bin Tariq

=== Sultans of Zanzibar ===
- 1856–1870 Sultan Majid bin Said
- 1870–1888 Sultan Barghash bin Said
- 1888–1890 Sultan Khalifa bin Said
- 1890–1893 Sultan Ali bin Said
- 1893–1896 Sultan Hamad bin Thuwaini
- 26 Aug 1896 Sultan Khalid bin Bargash
- 1896–1902 Sultan Hamud bin Mohammed
- 1902–1911 Sultan Ali bin Hamud
- 1911–1960 Sultan Khalifa bin Harub
- 1960–1963 Sultan Abdullah bin Khalifa
- 1963–1964 Sultan Jamshid bin Abdullah

== Family tree ==
House of Busaid

Oman (1744-present)
Zanzibar (1856-1964)

Ahmad bin Said^{(1)} r. 1744-1783
Said bin Ahmad^{(2)} r. 1783-1786	Sultan bin Ahmad^{(4)} r. 1792-1804	Qais bin Ahmad
Hamad bin Said^{(3)} r. 1786-1792	Said bin Sultan^{(5)} r. 1804-1856	Azzan bin Qais
Majid bin Said^{(1)} r. 1856-1870	Barghash bin Said^{(2)} r. 1870-1888	Khalifah bin Said^{(3)} r. 1888-1890	Ali bin Said^{(4)} r. 1890-1893	Mohammed bin Said	Thuwaini bin Said^{(6)} r. 1856-1866	Turki bin Said^{(9)} r. 1871-1888	Qais bin Azzan
Khalid bin Barghash^{(6)} r. 1896	Hamud bin Mohammed^{(7)} r. 1896-1902	Harub bin Thuwaini	Salim bin Thuwaini^{(7)} r. 1866-1868	Hamad bin Thuwaini^{(5)} r. 1893-1896	Turkia bint Turki	Faisal bin Turki^{(10)} r. 1888-1913	Azzan bin Qais^{(8)} r. 1868-1871
Ali bin Hamud^{(8)} r. 1902-1911	Matuka bint Hamud	Khalifa bin Harub^{(9)} r. 1911-1960	Taimur bin Faisal^{(11)} r. 1913-1932
Tohfa bint Ali	Abdullah bin Khalifa^{(10)} r. 1960-1963	Said bin Taimur^{(12)} r. 1932-1970	Tariq bin Taimur
Jamshid bin Abdullah^{(11)} r. 1963-1964	Qaboos bin Said^{(13)} r. 1970-2020	Haitham bin Tariq^{(14)} r. 2020-present

== Controversy ==
There have been reports of activists being jailed for criticism against the Sultan and the government. As Oman is classified as an absolute monarchy, the Sultan wields a great deal of power and has granted pardons to those who were jailed.
