= Bani Omar =

Omani Arab tribe of Oman and the United Arab Emirates

Bani Omar بَنِي عُمَر
- Qaysi or Qahtanite Arab tribe
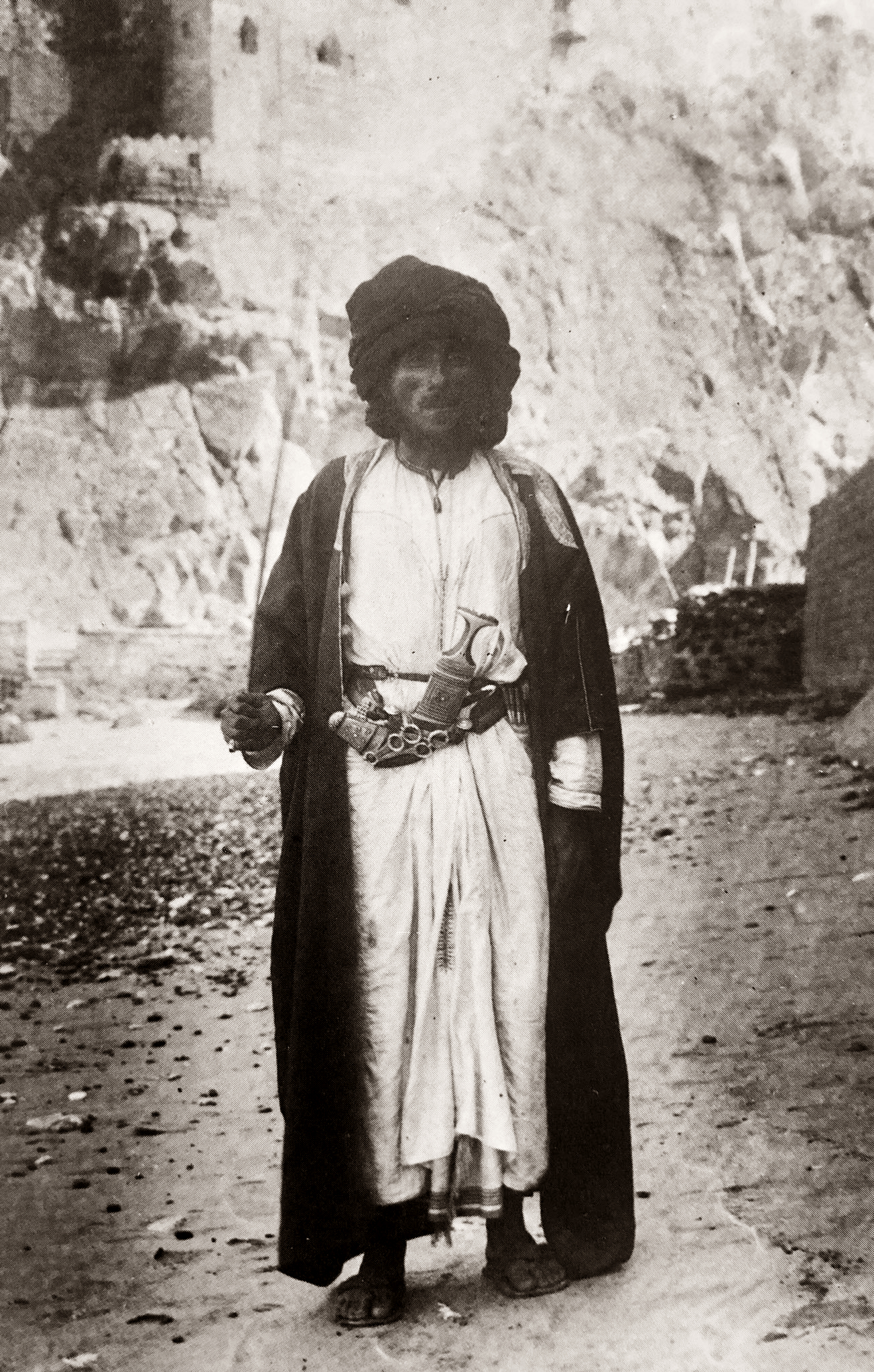
- Sheikh Ghusn bin Salim, tamimah of the Bani Omar, photographed c. 1928
- Ethnicity: Arab
- Nisba: Al-Maamari (المعمري)
- Location: Oman; United Arab Emirates; Abu Dhabi
- Descended from: Disputed; Umar ibn ʿĀmir ibn Ṣaʿṣaʿa; Ma'amar ibn Zubayd ibn Sa`b ibn Sa`d al-`Ashirah ibn Malik ibn Adad ibn Zayd ibn Yashjub ibn `Arib ibn Zayd ibn Kahlan ibn Saba` ibn Yashjub ibn Ya`rub ibn Qahtan
- Parent tribe: Banū ʿĀmir ibn Ṣaʿṣaʿa ibn Hawazin or Zubaid
- Confederation: Ghafiri
- Language: Arabic (Gulf, Omani, Emirati)
- Religion: Sunni Islam (Shafi'i)

The Bani Omar (Arabic: بَنِي عُمَر, romanized: Banī ‘Umar) singular Al Maamari (Arabic: المعمري), also spelled Al Mamari and Al Ma'amari are an Arab tribe of Oman and the United Arab Emirates.

== Location ==
The Bani Omar are primarily found in northern Oman, particularly across the Western Ḥajar Mountains and the adjacent governorates of Al Batinah North and Al Dhahirah, mainly in the border region between Oman and the United Arab Emirates. In Al Batinah North, the tribe is associated with settlements in and around the wilayats of Liwa, Saham, Shinas, and Sohar. They have a significant presence in Liwa, where the Bani Omar are most concentrated in settlements such as Harmul, Ghadfan, Al-Hadd, Al-Fazeel, Al-Naqda, Dhabyan, Rahb, and Bayda.

In Saham, the Bani Omar inhabit numerous settlements within Wadi Bani Omar, a wadi in the Western Hajar Mountains that takes its name from the tribe. In Shinas, they are found in settlements such as Al-Bulayda and Asrar Bani Omar, while in Sohar they are also present in Al-Humayra.

In Al Dhahirah, the Bani Omar are associated with northern Ibri, particularly the towns of Kahnat and al-Hiyal, which have long been associated with the tribe.

Smaller numbers of the tribe are also found in the Al Batinah South Governorate, including the Āl Jād clan in Barka and Al-Musannah. In the United Arab Emirates, members of the tribe are documented in Al Ain, in the Emirate of Abu Dhabi.

== Lineage and origins ==
There are two historical accounts transmitted by Omani and Arab sources about the origins of the Bani Omar.

=== Adnanite ===
One tradition traces the Bani Omar to ʿUmar ibn ʿAmir ibn Ṣaʿṣaʿa of Banu ʿAmir, a branch of Qays ʿAylan within the Hawazin and Nizar. Writing in Isʿāf al-Aʿyān fī Ansāb Ahl ʿUmān (The Genealogies of the People of Oman), Sheikh Salim bin Hamoud al-Siyabi classified the Bani Omar among the Nizari tribes of Oman and identified them as the descendants of ʿUmar ibn ʿAmir ibn Ṣaʿṣaʿa. He described them as being concentrated in Al Batinah and the outskirts of Al Dhahirah and noted their reputation for producing prominent figures and warriors. Al-Siyabi also claimed that the Bani Omar included the Banu Mirdas (Mirdasid dynasty), the rulers of Aleppo from 1014 to 1080.

=== Qahtanite ===
Omani writer Sulayman bin Khalaf al-Kharusi traced the Bani Omar to Ma'amar ibn Zubayd ibn Sa`b ibn Sa`d al-`Ashirah ibn Malik ibn Adad ibn Zayd ibn Yashjub ibn `Arib ibn Zayd ibn Kahlan ibn Saba` ibn Yashjub ibn Ya`rub ibn Qahtan of the Zubaid tribe, which forms part of the larger Qahtanite Madhhaj tribal confederation.

== History ==
Sheikh Ghusn bin Salim al-Maamari (left) with Sheikh Hamid bin Rakadh al-'Amri of the Awamir (right)

The Bani Omar are politically Ghafiri and adhere to the Shafi'i school of Sunni Islam, as with many tribes along the Batinah coast, except the minority outside northern Oman and the Emirates who are Ibadis. Originally a Bedouin tribe inhabiting the pastoral regions of the northern Al Batinah coastal plain and the Ḥajar Mountains, the Bani Omar underwent a process of sedentarisation and urbanisation during the twentieth century, transitioning into a Hadhari (civilized) society.

The Bani Omar have historically maintained close allegiance with the Sultans of Muscat, despite ideological differences, and served as military personnel responsible for guarding the Sultan's palaces and their wali's forts.

In 1893, the Bani Omar became involved in a conflict with the Hinawis and Bani Kalban in Oman proper. The dispute apparently arose from aggressions by the Bani Hina against the Al Khamaiyis near Hail Bani Hina. The Bani Hina were defeated in the fighting, and the dispute was eventually settled through arbitration.

By the beginning of the 20th century, the Bani Omar were regarded as a tribe of the Sultanate of Muscat and Oman and one of the largest Ghafiri tribes of northern Oman, with an estimated population of approximately 11,000. Their territory encompassed much of Wadi Bani Omar and extended across numerous settlements along the Batinah coast, with Ghadfan serving as their principal settlement in the north and Lihban in the south. The tribe maintained a longstanding rivalry with the neighbouring Hawasinah and Maqabil tribes. During this period, Sheikh Ghusn bin Salim al-Ma'amari, who resided near Liwa, served as the tribe's tamimah (paramount chief), alongside Sheikh Hamdan bin Sulayim of Hail in Al Dhahirah.

== Notable people ==
- Jaber Al Mamari (born 2001), Qatari sprinter
- Malek Bin Sulaiman Al Ma'amari, Omani police chief
- Mohammed bin Said bin Khalfan Al Mamari, Omani politician
- Musab Al-Mamari (born 2005) Omani footballer
- Salim Al Mamari (born 1999) Omani footballer
- Suleiman Al Maamari (born 1974), Omani writer
- Talib Al Mamari (born 1972), Omani politician and activist
- Murad Al Maamari, Omani businessman and former naval officer
- Wafia Al-Maamari (born 2003), Emirati chess player
- Ali Bin Majid Al Maamari, Omani politician
