= Talib Al Mamari =

Omani politician and activist (born 1972)

- طالب المعمري
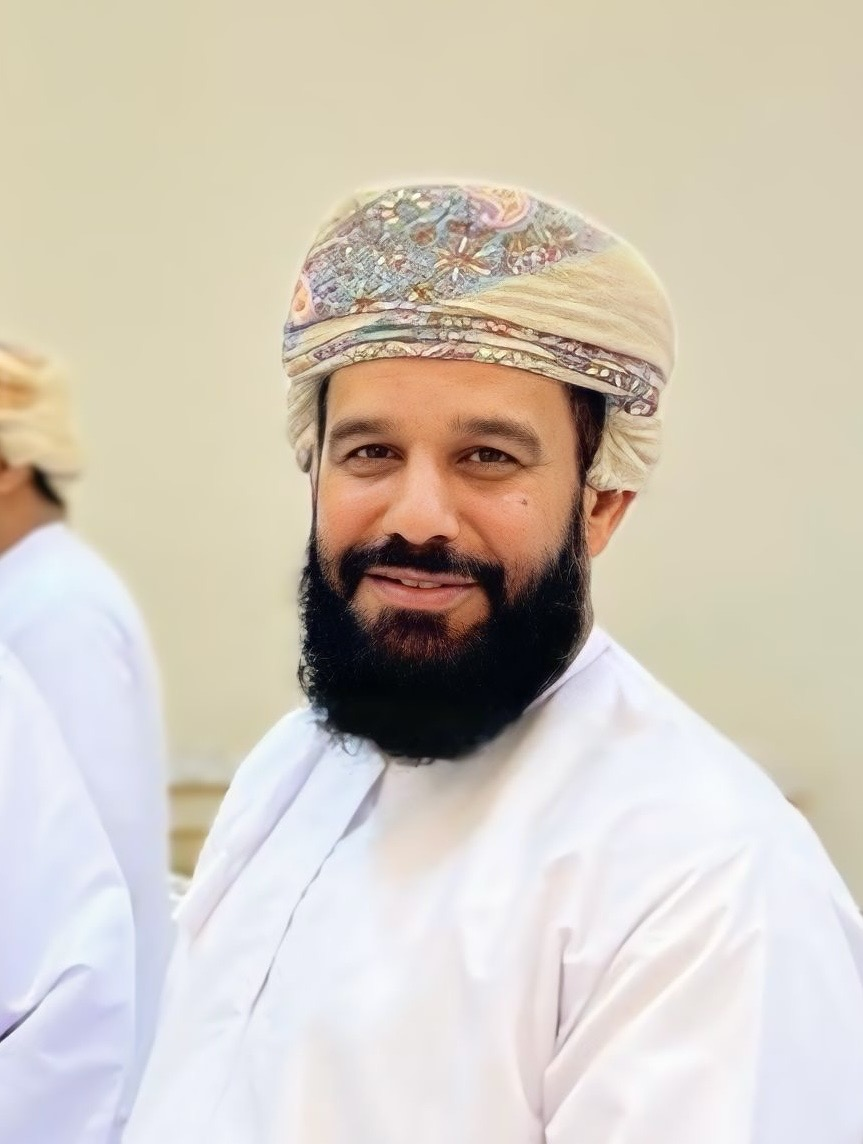
- Talib in 2025

Member of the Consultative Assembly of Oman
- In office 2011–2013
- Preceded by: Saleh bin Ibrahim bin Ali Al Balushi
- Succeeded by: Shammis bin Khalid bin Ahmed Al Raisi
- Constituency: Liwa

Personal details
- Born: Talib Ahmed Mohammad Ahmed Al Mamari; 24 May 1972 (age 54) Liwa, Sultanate of Oman
- Relatives: Murad Al Maamari (brother)
- Education: Sohar University; Cairo University (PhD)
- Awards: Alkarama Award For Human Rights Defenders
- Al Mamari's voice Al Mamari discussing his book Sufi Discourse in Contemporary Arabic Poetry; Recorded 21 October 2010

Talib Al Mamari (Arabic: طالب المعمري, romanized: Ṭālib al-Ma‘marī, IPA: [tˤaːlib ʔal-maʕmari]; born 24 May 1972) is an Omani academic, activist, human rights defender, writer, and former parliamentarian. He served in the Omani Consultative Assembly (Majlis al-Shura) from 2011 until his arrest in 2013 following his participation in a peaceful demonstration against pollution from petrochemical industries in his native constituency of Liwa.

Born in the Wilayah (Province) of Liwa in Oman's Al Batinah North Governorate, Al Mamari worked as an Arabic language teacher before serving as head of the Arabic Language Department at Sohar University for 12 years. Following parliamentary reform in Oman that took place in 2011, he was elected to the Omani Consultative Assembly (Majlis al-Shura), the lower house of the Council of Oman, where he represented the Wilayah of Liwa.

Al Mamari received widespread attention in 2013–2014 when he was arrested in August 2013 for participating in an environmental protest. His detention prompted statements from several human rights organisations and governments calling for his release. In 2014, the United Nations Working Group on Arbitrary Detention issued Opinion No. 53/2014 (Al Mamari v. Oman), concluding that his detention was arbitrary and that his right to freedom of expression had been violated. He was convicted of "harming the State's prestige", "obstructing traffic", and "disturbing public order", and was ultimately sentenced to three years before being granted a royal pardon.

== Early life and education ==
Talib Ahmed Mohammad Ahmed Al Mamari was born on 24 May 1972 in the Wilayah (Province) of Liwa, in Oman's Al Batinah North Governorate. He graduated from Sohar University with a degree in Literature and Linguistics and later obtained a PhD in Arabic Language from Cairo University. He pursued an academic career as a lecturer and Arabic language teacher before serving as head of the Arabic Language Department at Sohar University for 12 years.

Al Mamari held several professional and municipal positions and served in civil society organizations such as the Omani Society for Writers and Authors, the Scientific Research Council, the Al-Nour Association for the Blind, and the Liwa Municipal Committee from 2000 to 2003.

During the 2011 Omani protests, Al Mamari was detained in Sohar and put on trial in June, but was released without conviction.

== Literary career ==
During the early 2000s, Al Mamari worked as a writer for the Omani newspaper Al-Shabiba, contributing to its cultural supplements Ibdaʿ and Afaq. He wrote a weekly cultural column covering subjects including the Arabic language, poetry, and Arab poets. He subsequently discontinued his newspaper writing while working as a lecturer at Sohar University.

In 2010, Al Mamari published Sufi Discourse in Contemporary Arabic Poetry (Note: Arabic: الخطاب الصوفي في الشعر العربي المعاصر, romanized: al-Khiṭāb al-Ṣūfī fī al-Shiʿr al-ʿArabī al-Muʿāṣir), a study of Sufi elements in modern Arabic poetry. The book examines the poetic works of Adonis, Salah Abdel Sabour, Abd al-Wahhab al-Bayati, and Muhammad Afifi Matar, focusing on the ways in which modern poets incorporated elements of the Arabic Sufi tradition into their poetry.

== Member of the Majlis al-Shura (2011–2013) ==
Al Mamari was elected as a member of the Consultative Assembly following the 2011 parliamentary reforms in Oman, introduced by Sultan Qaboos through a royal decree that expanded the legislative powers of the Assembly. Political scientist Marc Valeri described him as a Salafi in his analysis of the 2011 protests. A vocal advocate against environmental damage and pollution in Liwa, he also criticised the government's commitment to the rule of law and its system of governance.

Al Mamari emerged as one of the Assembly's most outspoken members. He became known for scrutinizing government ministers, criticizing government policies, and advocating on behalf of his constituents in Liwa, particularly those affected by industrial pollution. His parliamentary interventions, which were broadcast on national television and widely shared on social media, significantly increased his public profile.

In 2012, a local journalist described Al Mamari as an idol in Liwa, where residents credited his advocacy with prompting the government to address longstanding demands for land, housing, and financial compensation. The government's willingness to discuss these grievances helped establish Al Mamari as a local political leader.

In May 2012, after Al Mamari criticized an employee of the Ministry of Housing on Facebook, the Public Prosecution initiated defamation proceedings against him, requesting that the Consultative Assembly lift his parliamentary immunity so that he could be prosecuted. The Assembly rejected the request, with the case prompting protests in Sohar and Liwa.

According to the submission to the United Nations Working Group on Arbitrary Detention, Al Mamari was beaten, threatened, and handcuffed by police officers while staying at a hotel in late 2012. The submission alleged that the threats were linked to his role in the Consultative Assembly and his criticism of the government.

== Protest and arrest ==
=== Protest ===
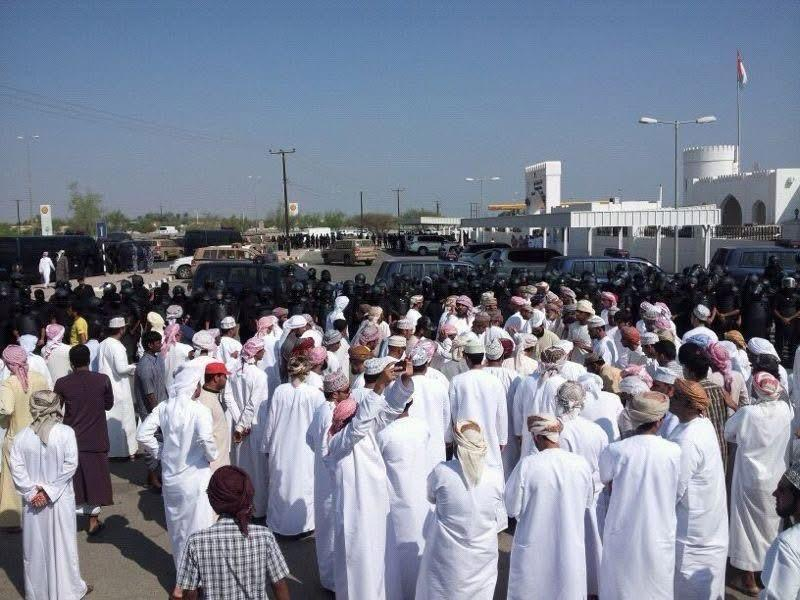
Protesters gathered outside the Liwa Government Office

On 22 August 2013, Al Mamari, among others, were involved in a peaceful demonstration in front of the Sohar Port gate against industrial pollution posing a health hazard for those living in Liwa. Security forces fired tear gas and used a water cannon to disperse the demonstrators, injuring several people, including Al Mamari.

=== Arrest ===
The day after the protest, on 23 August 2013, Al Mamari met with members of the Consultative Assembly, security officials, municipal council members, and several tribal sheikhs at the headquarters of the Sohar Police Directorate to discuss the demonstrations and the security forces' response. After the meeting, Al Mamari returned to his brother, Captain Murad Al Maamari's house in the early hours of 24 August 2013, where he was staying at the time. According to the submission to the United Nations Working Group on Arbitrary Detention, the house was subsequently surrounded by dozens of police vehicles before officers entered and arrested him. He was then detained by the Internal Security Service until the judgment was issued on 10 October 2013. He was later charged with the offence of "gathering in public".

=== Trial ===
Held in solitary confinement in the Muscat National Security Prison, Al Mamari was denied access to his lawyer during the whole period preceding his appeal. According to his brother, Captain Murad Al Mamari, Al Mamari denied the charges of inciting the demonstrators during his interrogation.

On 10 October 2013, Al Mamari was found guilty of the charges against him and was sentenced to seven years in jail and a fine of 1,000 Omani rials (approximately US$2600.78 at the time) for "obstructing traffic", "disturbing public order", and "impairing the honour of the state". After being released on bail on 11 October 2013, Al Mamari was rearrested later that same day based on accusations that he was responsible for incitement during Friday prayers at a mosque. During the sermon, he discussed his case, stated that he was prepared to endure the sentence imposed against him, and affirmed that he would continue to defend the rights of residents of Liwa. On 16 December 2013, a court of appeals upheld the verdict against Al Mamari, reducing his sentence to four years in prison and a 500-rial (approximately US$1300.39 at the time) fine.

On 7 May 2014, three Omani citizens were arrested after advocating for Al Mamari's release and expressing support for him on social media. According to a communication issued by several United Nations special procedures, Ibrahim Abdullah Juma Al Balushi, Nasser Soulayman Al-Yahyai, and Talal Mohammed Ahmed Al-Mamari had provided information about Al Mamari's case to human rights organisations and were subsequently arrested after being summoned to the Internal Security Service headquarters in Muscat. The three were reportedly held at the headquarters' special section without charges and denied access to lawyers and their families. The three men, along with Said Al-Zeidi, were released without charge on 12 July after signing undertakings that included commitments not to engage in advocacy work or incite sectarianism.

Following further appeals, during which one of the complainants alleged violations of due process and judicial independence, the Court of Appeal reduced his sentence to three years' imprisonment in October 2014. During this period, Al Mamari was repeatedly detained for extended periods without being granted bail.

=== International reaction ===
Supporters of Al Mamari displaying his portrait during a demonstration calling for his release in Harmul, 2014

The arrest and detention of Al Mamari prompted a number of human rights organisations and nations including the Inter-Parliamentary Union, Amnesty International, the Gulf Centre for Human Rights, the Parliament of Zambia, and Human Rights Watch to issue statements calling for his release.

During an official visit to Oman from 8 to 13 September 2014, the United Nations Special Rapporteur on the Rights to Freedom of Peaceful Assembly and of Association Maina Kìai requested permission to meet with Al Mamari, who was then serving his sentence at Samail Central Prison. The Special Rapporteur reported that the Ministry of Foreign Affairs did not accommodate the request, and criticized the lack of access to Al Mamari and representatives of the Ministry of the Interior, emphasizing that mandate holders should have unrestricted access to prisons and government authorities during country visits.

In December 2014, the United Nations Working Group on Arbitrary Detention (UNWGAD) concluded that Al Mamari's detention was arbitrary and violated Articles 19 and 21 of the Universal Declaration of Human Rights. Nevertheless, the Omani authorities did not comply with the request of the WGAD to release Al Mamari and he remained in custody.

== Later career ==
Al Mamari was released from Sama'il prison near Muscat, the capital of Oman on 4 May 2016 on a royal pardon from the late Sultan Qaboos. In March 2022, Al Mamari publicly requested a meeting with Sultan Haitham bin Tariq through a post on Twitter saying that there were "facts that need to be presented transparently and sincerely."

In 2023, Al Mamari stated on X (formerly Twitter) that he had been unable to obtain employment and alleged that he was effectively being prevented from working because of his previous imprisonment since his release from prison, claiming that prospective employers had cited “higher orders” when rejecting his applications. He also alleged that his curriculum vitae had been discarded or withheld from hiring committees at some institutions, which he attributed to his previous imprisonment and political activism.

== Awards ==
External videos
- فيلم عن طالب المعمري - جائزة الكرامة 2015 Talib Al Mamari , Alkarama Award (in Arabic)

On 8 December 2015 while he was still imprisoned, Al Mamari received Alkarama, a Geneva-based human rights organisation's 2015 Award for Human Rights Defenders in the Arab World. Mourad Dhina, executive director at Alkarama, stated:

Talib Al Mamari is a prisoner of conscience and a courageous human rights defender. By his unwavering non-violent fight against harmful environmental policies in Oman, he has become a model in the region as a dedicated militant who is genuinely close to the citizens' concerns. Alkarama is proud to honour him.

The award was presented in Geneva on 8 December 2015, with Swiss politician Ueli Leuenberger accepting it on Al Mamari’s behalf.

== Works ==
- Sufi Discourse in Contemporary Arabic Poetry

== See also ==
- Human rights in Oman
