= Sultan Qaboos Mosque =

Sultan Qaboos Mosque may refer to any of the following mosques, being named after the former Sultan of Oman, Qaboos bin Said:

- Sultan Qaboos Grand Mosque in Muscat, Oman
- Sultan Qaboos Grand Mosque in Al-Buraimi, Oman
- Sultan Qaboos Grand Mosque in Sohar, Northern Batinah
