= Nabr =

Village in Oman

Nabr Nabr (نبر) Naber
- Village
- Location in Oman Nabr (Middle East) Nabr (West and Central Asia)
- Coordinates: 24.56479°N 56.56188°E
- Country: Oman
- Governorate: Al Batinah North
- Wilayah: Liwa

Area
  - Total: 4.094 km^{2} (1.581 sq mi)

Population (2020)
  - Total: 2,287
- Time zone: UTC+4 (Gulf Standard Time)

Nabr (Arabic: نبر) also known as Naber, is a village located in the Wilayah (province) of Liwa, North Al Batinah Governorate in the Sultanate of Oman. Its population is estimated at 2,287 people.
