= Liwa Fort =

17th century fort in Oman

- Arabic: حِصْنُ لِوَىٰ
- Near Harmul in Liwa, Al Batinah North Governorate, Oman
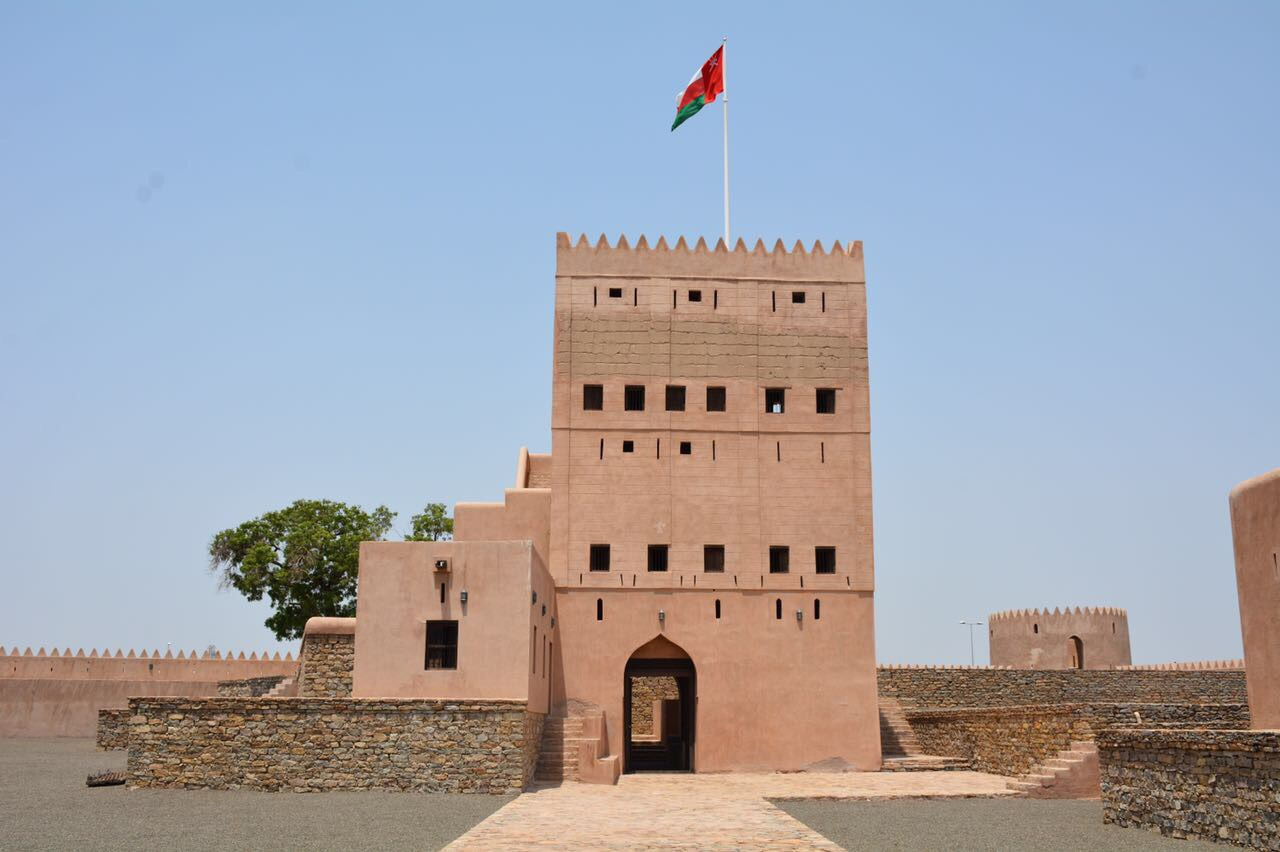
- A view of Liwa Fort

Site information
- Type: Fort
- Owner: The Government of Oman under the Ministry of Heritage and Tourism
- Controlled by: The Ya'rubid Dynasty under the Imamate of Oman (1600s–1738): Omani Empire (1738–1856); Muscat and Oman (1856–1970); Oman (1970–present)
- Open to the public: Yes
- Condition: Restored

Location
- Location in Oman
- Coordinates: 24.521761°N 56.575745°E

Site history
- Built: 17th century (approx.)

Garrison information
- Garrison: Royal Army of Oman (1600s–2002) The Royal Oman Police as guards (2003-present)

Liwa Fort (Arabic: حِصْنُ لِوَىٰ, romanized: Hiṣn Liwā) is a fort located in the eastern coast of the Wilayah (Province) of Liwa in Oman. Located about 1.5 kilometers from the center of the Wilayah, the fort was built by the Ya'rubids around 400 years ago under either Imam Nasir bin Murshid or Sultan bin Saif.

58 meters in length and 75 meters in width, it was once regarded as the center of Liwa, the fort was used for protection as well as the residence of the Wali (Governor), and a place to discuss and manage the Wilayah’s affairs. The fort is unique because it is located very far from the sea, which is unusual for many Omani forts. The fort is allegedly the namesake of the entire Wilayat of Liwa, accredited to the many palm trees twining around the fort.

== Location ==
Liwa Fort is located in the Wilayah (Province) of Liwa, part of the Al Batinah North Governorate in northern Oman. Positioned approximately 1.5 kilometers from the center of the Wilayat, the fort lies near the coast, surrounded by farmland, it can be reached via Harmul Street, an ancillary thoroughfare in Liwa. Its towers provide views of nearby settlements, including the coastal village of Harmul, located 2 kilometers away, famous for its natural mangrove habitats and graffiti art.

== Architecture and use ==
Liwa Fort is characterised by its high walls and five observation towers, providing expansive views of the surrounding region. The central structure, known as Al-Qasbah, is a three-story building featuring five rooms and two halls. This building housed the Wali and his family and served as a place for governance and observation. Additionally, there is a Majlis (guest & conference room), historically known as "Al Sablah". The Ministry of Heritage and Culture started restoration work in 2000 for the Fort and completed it in 2003.

== See also ==
- Culture of Oman
