= Palace Office (Oman) =

Government position in the Sultanate of Oman

Coordinates: 23°35′21″N 58°28′41″E

Sultanate of Oman The Royal Office
- المكتب السلطاني
- Royal emblem of Oman

Agency overview
- Formed: 1985
- Jurisdiction: Government of Oman
- Headquarters: Qurum, Muscat Governorate, Sultanate of Oman
- Agency executive: General Sultan bin Mohammed al Nua'mani, Minister of the Royal Office

The Royal Office (Arabic: المكتب السلطاني transliterated: maktab al sultani ) is one of the most senior and therefore powerful ministries in the Sultanate of Oman. It is a government body that has most influence in national security and intelligence issues and the minister in charge has been the de facto national security advisor to the Sultan. The Palace Office also acts as a foreign liaison focus on all international intelligence and security matters.

The minister holding the post has the full title Minister of the Royal Office and Head of the Office of the Supreme Commander of the Armed Forces. The Royal Office Minister also member of The Defence Council. The Defence Council is an extra-parliamentary body tasked with coordinating the actions of the country's various security and armed forces.

The current Minister of the Royal Office is General Sultan bin Mohammed al Nua'mani (appointed in 2011); he had been Secretary General of the Royal Court Affairs. Nasser bin Hamoud al Kindi took over the latter post.

The Royal Office is located in Qurum. Its nearest government agency neighbor being the Internal Security Service (ISS), also based in Qurum (Post Code 112).

== History ==
Although the Palace Office as is may not have been established until the 1980s there is evidence that British advisors had begun the work of setting the office up as early as 1972. Certainly influential characters such as Brigadier Sir Timothy Landon and Sheilagh Bailey were critical in developing the early functionality of what would become the Palace Office. It was particularly important that the small nucleus of trusted advisors made arrangements to secure the ruler of Oman in the 1970s and establish contacts with neighboring states to ensure their cooperation.

== Office functions ==
The functions of the Minister of the Palace Office are:

1. To head the office of the Supreme Commander of the Armed Forces.
2. Be a lead member of the Sultanate's Defense Committee.
3. Oversee the functions of special security capabilities within the Sultanate (e.g. the ISS and Sultan's Special Forces)
4. Act as external liaison to international intelligence and security agencies.
5. Act with the Royal Oman Police and ISS to form and implement anti-corruption policy in the Sultanate.

== National security challenges ==
It seems certain that the main National Security Challenges affecting Oman are internal rather than external and an attempted coup d'etat in 2005, which was easily quashed and street unrest in the spring of 2011 and later in 2012, all point to a simmering unrest with the status quo.

In early March 2011 HM Sultan Qaboos bin Said al Said decided to replace two key ministers who were seen by many as not keeping in touch with young Omanis not benefiting from Oman's national advances. The long-standing favorite advisor of the Sultan General Ali bin Majid al Maamari was replaced by the relatively unknown and younger General Sultan bin Mohammed al Nua'mani. The current Minister's remit appears unchanged.

The Sultanate has also experienced challenges in maintaining its neutrality in the conflict in neighboring Yemen. It has been accused by its GCC partners of not being genuinely neutral and favoring the Houthi rebels.

== Past Palace Office ministers ==
- HE General Ali bin Majid al Maamari (1985 – March 2011)

== See also ==
- Cabinet of Oman
- 2011 Omani protests
- Human rights in Oman
- Internal Security Service
