= List of mosques in Oman =

This is a list of mosques in Oman.

Name	Images	Location	Year CE	Remarks
Sultan Qaboos Grand Mosque		Bawshar, Muscat	2001	The largest mosque in Oman.
Mohammed Al Ameen Mosque		Bawshar, Muscat	2014	Also known as the "Bahwan Mosque".
Zawawi Mosque		Al Khuwair, Muscat	1985	Built in the memory of 'Abdul-Mun'im Al-Zawawi by his relatives.
Sultan Qaboos Grand Mosque, Sohar		Sohar, North Batinah	2016	The largest mosque in North Batinah Governorate.
Sultan Qaboos Grand Mosque, Al-Buraimi		Al-Buraimi	1993	The largest mosque in Al-Buraimi.
Mazin Bin Ghadoubah Mosque		Samail, Ad-Dakhiliyyah	c. 627	The oldest mosque in the country.
Al-Shawathna Mosque		Nizwa, Ad-Dakhiliyyah	629	Second oldest mosque in the country.
Sa'al Mosque		Nizwa	630	The third oldest mosque in the country.

== See also ==
- Islam in Oman
- Lists of mosques
