= Hazza Al Balushi =

Omani Quran reciter (born 1995)

Sheikh Hazza Al Balushi
- هزاع البلوشي
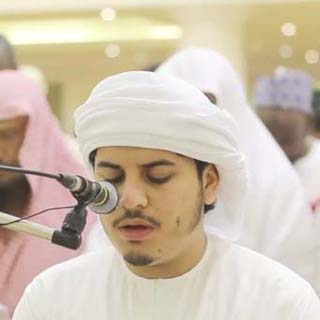

Personal life
- Born: Hazza bin Abdullah bin Salem Al Balushi (Arabic: هزاع بن عبد الله بن سالم البلوشي); April 10, 1995 (age 31) Liwa, Oman
- Education: Sultan Qaboos University
- Occupation: Qari
- Website: Hazza Al Balushi's channel on YouTube

Religious life
- Religion: Islam
- Sect: Sunni
- Jurisprudence: Shafi'i

Hazza Al Balushi (Note: Arabic: هزاع البلوشي, romanized: Hazzaʿ al-Balushi) (born 10 April 1995) is an Omani Qāriʾ (Quran reciter) and Hafiz. His recitations have gained widespread popularity in the Gulf, and his videos have garnered millions of views on YouTube.

== Early life and education ==
Hazza bin Abdullah bin Salem Al Balushi was born on 10 April 1995 in the Wilayah (Province) of Liwa, in Oman's Al Batinah North Governorate. His father played a role in discovering his abilities as a Qur'an reciter.

Al Balushi began memorizing the Qur'an at the age of seven, continuing his memorization at the mosque in the village where he lived. He completed memorizing the Qur'an at the age of thirteen and subsequently attended Qur'anic courses in Saudi Arabia in 2012 and 2013.

He graduated with a degree in economics and political science at Sultan Qaboos University.

== Career ==
His Qur'anic recitation first gained widespread attention in 2013, when one of his friends published a recording of his recitation. The recording attracted considerable attention, after which he gained widespread popularity.

From 2013 onward, Al Balushi represented Oman in several countries, including countries across the Gulf, where he participated in Ramadan and religious programs. He said that he began participating in Ramadan programs in Europe, particularly in the United Kingdom, in 2016.

In March 2025, Al Balushi received a certificate for completing the Qur'an in the various Qur'anic readings from the Sharjah Holy Qur'an Academy in Sharjah, United Arab Emirates. He received the certificate at a graduation ceremony held in Sharjah for graduates of the complex. The certificate was signed by Sultan bin Muhammad Al-Qasimi, the ruler of Sharjah, who met with Al Balushi at the ceremony. Al Balushi said that he had graduated from the Holy Qur'an Complex and received a Qur'anic ijazah with an uninterrupted chain of transmission to the Prophet Muhammad.
