= Fazah =

Village in Oman

Fazah فزح
- Village
- Location in Oman Fazah (Middle East) Fazah (West and Central Asia)
- Coordinates: 24.51010645934973°N 56.447438169309855°E
- Country: Oman
- Governorate: Al Batinah North
- Wilayah: Liwa

Area
  - Total: 1.092 km^{2} (0.422 sq mi)

Population (2020)
  - Total: 917
- Time zone: UTC+4 (Gulf Standard Time)

Fazah (Arabic: فزح) is a village located in the Wilayah (province) of Liwa, North Al Batinah Governorate in the Sultanate of Oman. Its population is estimated at 917 people.
