= SOHAR Port and Freezone =

- Interactive map of SOHAR Port and Freezone
- Location within Oman

Location
- Country: Oman
- Location: Liwa, Al Batinah North Governorate
- Coordinates: 24°30′15″N 56°36′37″E

Details
- Opened: 2002
- Operated by: Sohar Industrial Port Company (SIPC)
- Owned by: Sultanate of Oman & Port of Rotterdam
- Type of Harbor: Seaport

Statistics
- Website www.soharportandfreezone.com

SOHAR Port and Freezone is a deep-sea port and adjacent free zone in the Middle East, located in Liwa, Sultanate of Oman, despite the name. With current investments exceeding $26 billion & a footprint of over 4,500 hectares, it is one of the world's fastest growing port and free zone developments and lies at the centre of global trade routes between Europe and Asia.

SOHAR Port and Freezone is managed by the Sohar Industrial Port Company (SIPC), a 50:50 joint venture between the Port of Rotterdam and the Sultanate of Oman.

The Port handles over one million tonnes of sea cargo each week and around 3,500 ships a year; it is equipped with deep-water jetties capable of handling some of the world's largest vessels, such as the Valemax class of dry bulk carriers.

== Location ==
The wilaya (province) of Liwa lies in the centre of the Al Batinah North Governorate, in the North of Oman. This provides the port with a strategic location outside the Strait of Hormuz - the stretch of water providing the only passage between the Persian Gulf and the Indian Ocean, and an important means of sea transportation linking the Gulf Arab states to India, the rest of the Middle East, China and South East Asia, as well as Europe.

== History ==
In 1995, Sultan Qaboos, set up a ministerial committee to develop the Port of Salalah (previously called Raysut) and establish a new port in Sohar. Informal advisory work began from 1998 to 2000 in close cooperation with the Ministry of Transport and Communication. Subsequently, the first phase of the port was developed by the Government of Oman.

In July 2002, the Government of Oman and the Port of Rotterdam signed a memorandum of understanding (MoU) to develop a concession agreement for SOHAR Port. The Royal Decree no. 80/2002 ratified the concession agreement of SOHAR Port and was issued in August of the same year. The construction of the petrochemical complex, terminal and other utilities of the port commenced in 2003. The first lease agreement between Sohar Industrial Port Company and Sohar Refinery was signed in the same year. In 2003, Captain Murad Al Maamari was appointed as the first harbourmaster of the port.

In early 2004, global logistics and warehousing service provider, C. Steinweg Group, established C. Steinweg Oman LLC in Oman. This company was subsequently awarded the concession for all dry bulk, break-bulk, roll-on/roll-off and container stuffing and stripping related operations in the Port of Sohar. In 2007, a concession agreement for SOHAR Port to develop a 4,500 ha free zone was signed, and SOHAR Freezone was established in 2010.

== Operations ==
SOHAR Port and Freezone was originally planned around three key industrial clusters, namely logistics, metals, and petrochemicals. The port has since added a fourth pillar with the launch of the SOHAR Food Cluster, complemented by the first dedicated agro bulk terminal in a region heavily dependent on food imports.

=== Logistics ===
The SOHAR Port South expansion is fundamental to Oman's national focus on growing the logistics and industry sectors as part of its ongoing economic diversification efforts. This expansion aims to aid the steady growth in aggregate cargo volumes and investments at the port by delivering additional cargo capacity and attracting more business. It will add 250 hectares to the industrial port's current capacity of 2,000 hectares by January 2019. The first phase is underway with an increase of 50 hectares in area, and additional expansions are planned in subsequent phases.

=== Metals ===
The metals cluster at SOHAR Port and Freezone has experienced rapid development over the years. SOHAR is equipped with deep-water jetties capable of handling the Valemax class of Very Large Ore Carriers (VLOCs), which are among the world's largest ships. Apart from aluminium and steel, SOHAR also hosts the largest rare earth metal plant of its kind, second only to China. The plant will manufacture antimony metal and trioxide, a precious mineral used as a flame retardant in a wide range of industries. A recent signing will also see the construction of additional ferrochrome furnaces that will increase production capacity.

=== Petrochemicals ===
SOHAR was initially home to Oman Oil Refineries and Petroleum Industries Company (ORPIC), whose refineries in Sohar and Muscat as well as their integrated aromatics and polypropylene plants, provide fuel, petrochemicals, polymers and other petroleum products to the Sultanate and to the world. The company was merged with Oman Oil company in 2019 to form OQ. Apart from fuel products, the refinery also produces significant volumes of naphtha and propylene, which serve as feedstock for an adjoining aromatics and polypropylene plant.

=== Food ===
The Food Cluster at SOHAR includes a flourmill, a sugar refinery, a grain silo complex and an upcoming soya bean crushing facility. The cluster is able to load and unload 600 tonnes of grain per hour.

== See also ==
- Oman Vision 2040
- Port of Rotterdam
