= Mohammed Al Ameen Mosque =

Mosque in Bawshar Governarate, Muscat, Oman

Mohammad Al-Ameen Mosque
- جامع محمد الأمين
- The mosque in 2020

- Location of the mosque in Oman

Religion
- Affiliation: Sunni Islam
- Ecclesiastical or organizational status: Mosque
- Status: Active

Location
- Location: Bawshar, Muscat Governorate
- Country: Oman
- Interactive map of Mohammad Al-Ameen Mosque
- Coordinates: 23°34′43″N 58°24′51″E

Architecture
- Groundbreaking: 2008
- Completed: 2014

Specifications
- Capacity: 2,730 worshipers
- Dome: 3
- Minaret: 2
- Site area: 20,300 m^{2} (219,000 sq ft)
- Materials: Marble; gold plate; crystals; timber
- Elevation: 62.5 m (205 ft)

The Mohammad Al-Ameen Mosque (Arabic: جامع محمد الأمين), also referred to as the Bahwan Mosque after its private financiers, is located in Bawshar, in the Muscat Governorate of the Sultanate of Oman. The mosque was completed in 2014.

== Architecture ==
Constructed of marble, the mosque is located off the Southern Expressway, with work commenced in 2008 and completed in 2014. The construction team included designers, materials, technologies, artists and suppliers from Iran, Italy, Germany, Austria, India and the United Kingdom. The mosque site is 20,300 square metres (219,000 sq ft); and the main prayer hall is 1,616 square metres (17,390 sq ft) and can accommodate 2,100 worshiper. The chandelier in the main prayer hall is 11 metres (36 ft) tall, and the chandelier in the women's prayer hall is 4.5 metres (15 ft) tall. Both chandeliers are finished with 24-karat gold-plating and Swarovski crystals. The mosque has 3,000 square metres (32,000 sq ft) of hand-carved stone works in the form of Islamic patterns and calligraphy.

The interior spaces feature a contemporary Omani style with rich carved woods accenting white marble.

== See also ==
- Islam in Oman
- List of mosques in Oman
