= Sultan Qaboos Grand Mosque, Sohar =

Mosque in Sohar, Al Batinah North, Oman

Sultan Qaboos Grand Mosque
- جَامِع ٱلسُّلْطَان قَابُوْس ٱلْأَكْبَر
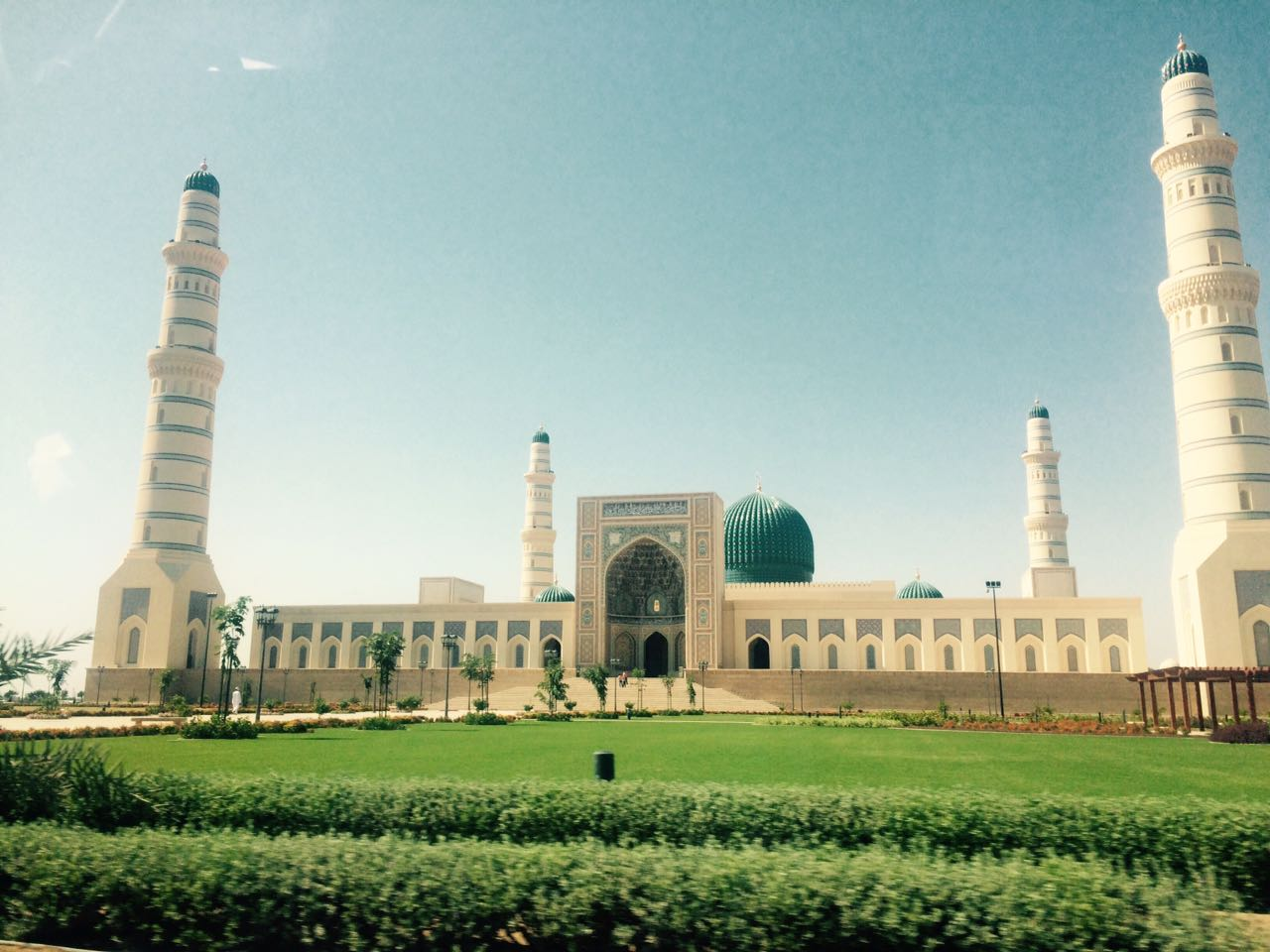
- The mosque in 2017

- Location of the mosque in Oman

Religion
- Affiliation: Islam
- Ecclesiastical or organisational status: Friday mosque
- Status: Active

Location
- Location: Sohar, Al Batinah North Governorate
- Country: Oman
- Interactive map of Sultan Qaboos Grand Mosque
- Coordinates: 24°18′45.65″N 56°45′25.02″E

Architecture
- Style: Timurid
- Completed: 2016

Specifications
- Capacity: c. 4,600 worshipers
- Interior area: 181,000 m^{2} (1,950,000 sq ft)
- Dome: 3
- Minaret: 4
- Site area: 28,778 m^{2} (309,760 sq ft)

The Sultan Qaboos Grand Mosque (Arabic: جَامِع ٱلسُّلْطَان قَابُوْس ٱلْأَكْبَر, romanized: Jāmiʿ As-Sulṭān Qābūs Al-Akbar) is a Friday mosque located in Sohar, in the governorate of Al Batinah North, in the Sultanate of Oman. The mosque was named in honor of the previous Sultan of Oman, Qaboos bin Said.

== Description ==
The mosque is built on a site occupying 181,000 square metres (1,950,000 sq ft), and the built-up area is 28,778 square metres (309,760 sq ft). The area allocated for the mosque accommodates landscaping, car parks and other facilities. The main prayer hall can hold over 4,600 worshipers, while the women's area can accommodate 740 worshipers. It is one of the only mosques in the Arabian Peninsula to be built in the Central Asian Timurid style, taking inspiration from the Bibi-Khanym Mosque and the Gur-e-Amir.

The mosque has a garden, three main entrances, four minarets, and a blue main dome. It also integrates wood in its design. The interior of the mosque is intricate with subtle colors. The mihrab is tiled in a turquoise and gold palette. The carpet has a horizontally-lined pattern. Muqarnases are present under the main entrance iwan.

== Gallery ==
Street view of the mosque

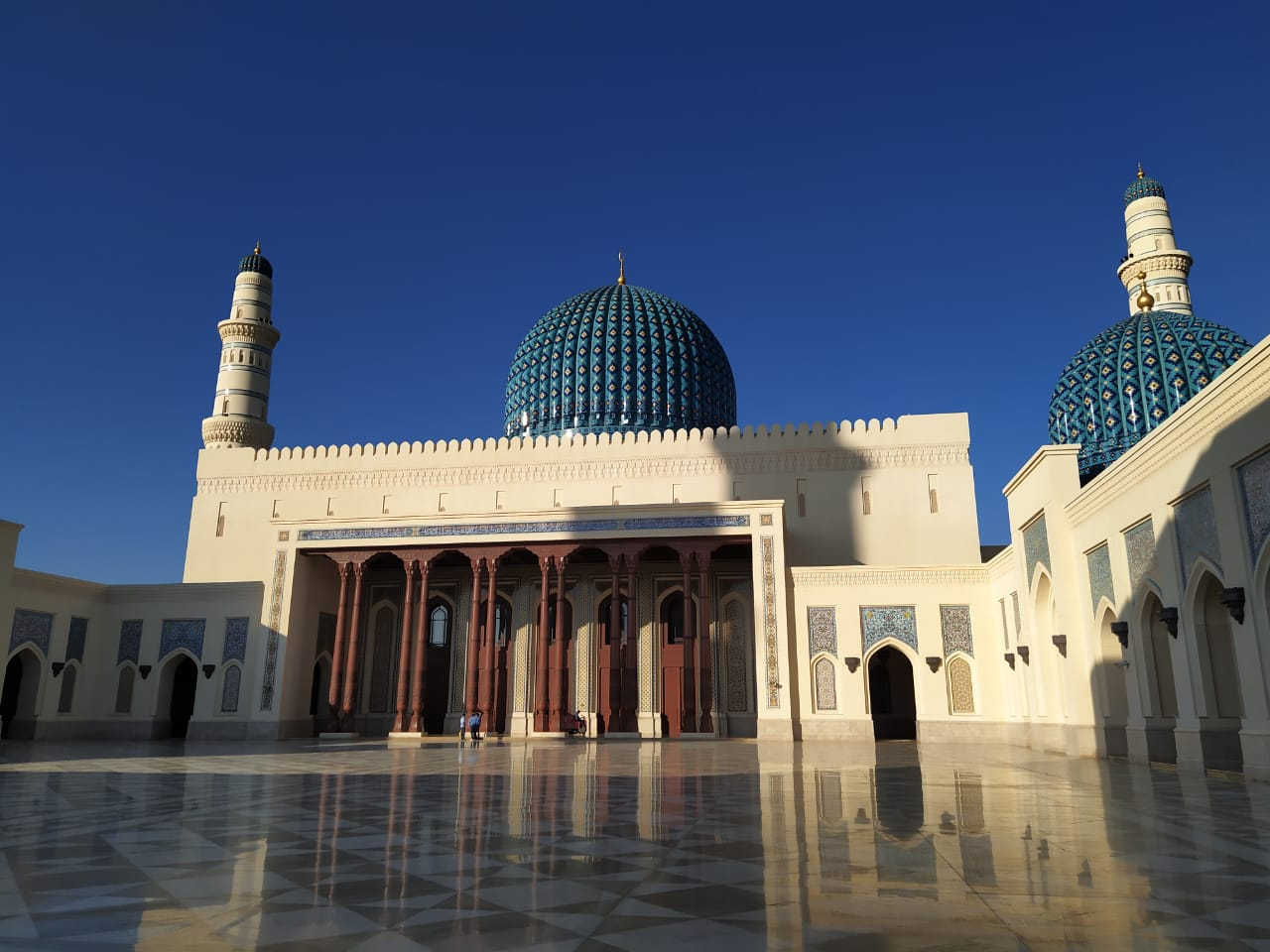
Outside view of the prayer hall

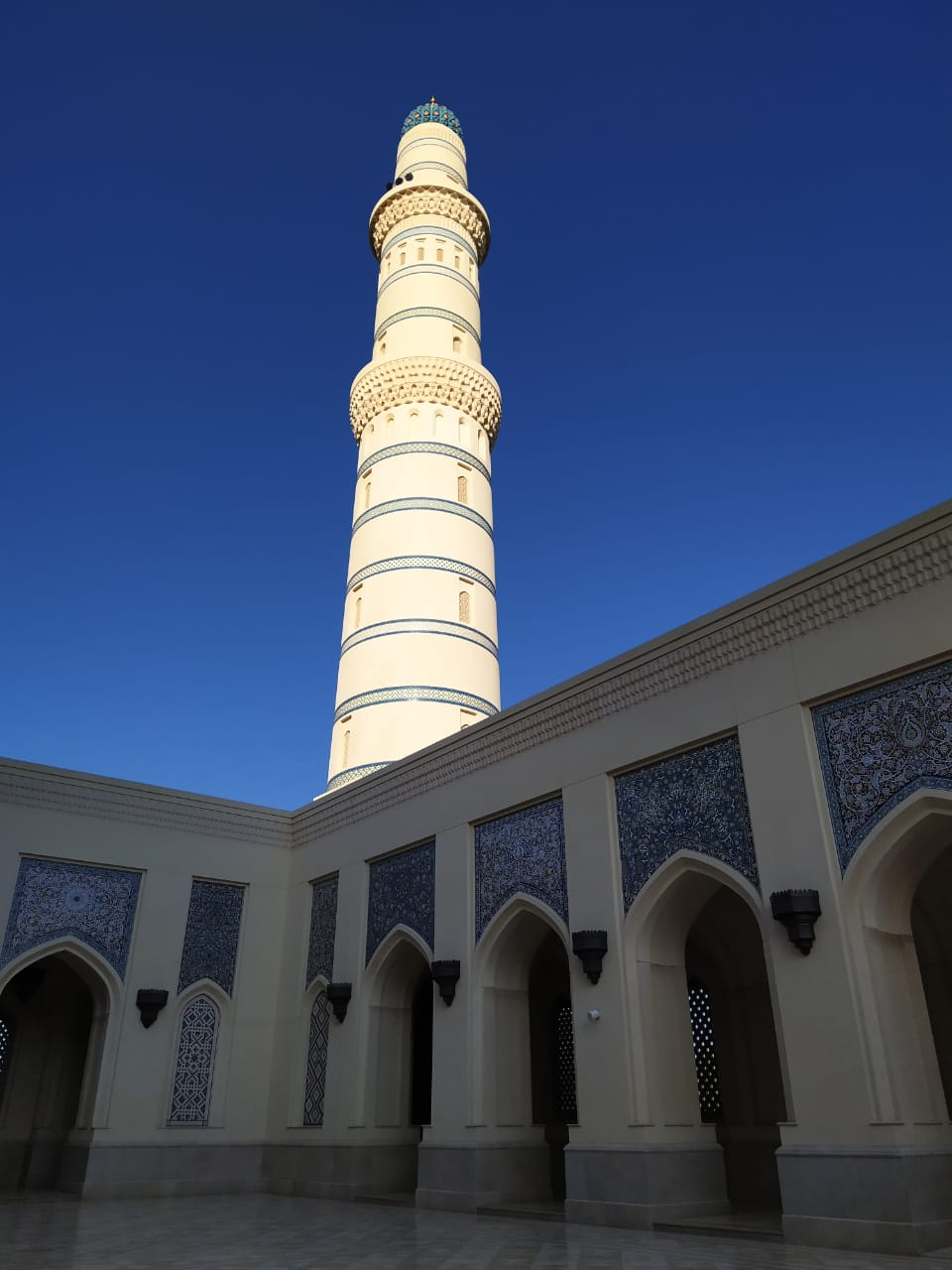
One of the minarets

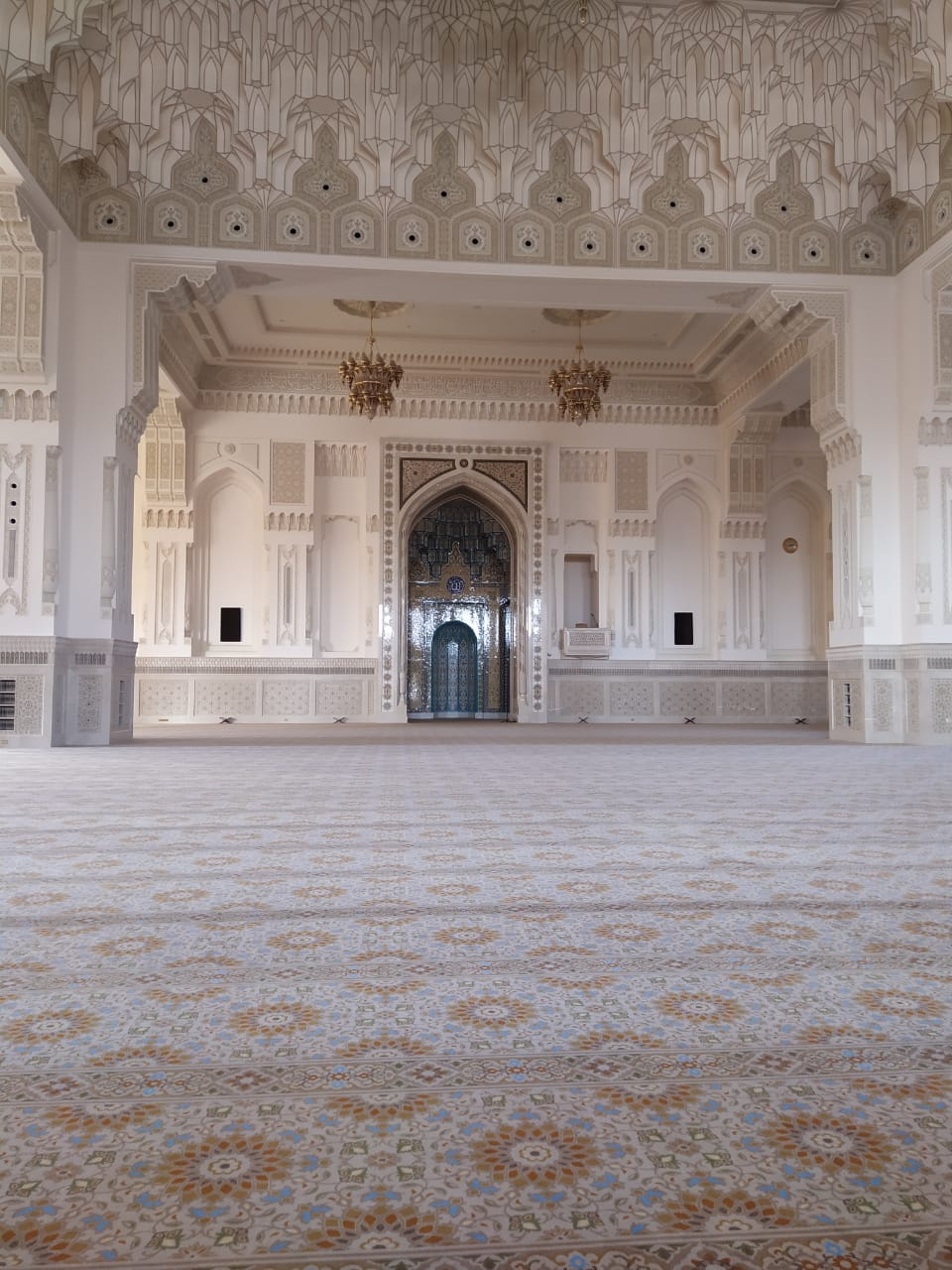
Interior of the prayer hall

== See also ==
- Islam in Oman
- List of mosques in Oman
