= Murad Al Maamari =

Omani businessman and former naval officer

Captain Murad Al Maamari
- مراد المعمري
- Murad in 2020
- Born: Murad Ahmed Mohammed Ahmed Al Maamari; Harmul, Oman
- Education: Britannia Royal Naval College; Kazan Federal University (DBA)
- Relatives: Talib Al Mamari (brother)
- Military career
- Allegiance: Oman
- Branch: Royal Navy of Oman
- Service years: 1986–1995
- Rank: Captain
- Awards: His Majesty’s Sword of Honour
- Other work: Businessman and maritime executive

Captain Murad Al Maamari (Arabic: مراد المعمري, romanized: Murād al-Maʿammarī, IPA: [muˈraːd ʔal-maʕmari]) is an Omani businessman and former naval officer. He was the first harbourmaster of Sohar Port and is Oman's first certified marine surveyor. He is also the founder and managing director of Blue Wave Shipping Agency.

== Early life and education ==
Captain Murad at Britannia Royal Naval College

Murad Ahmed Mohammed Ahmed Al Maamari was born in the village of Harmul, located in the Wilayah (Province) of Liwa, in Oman's Al Batinah North Governorate. He is the brother of politician and activist Talib Al Mamari. Born into a fishing family, Captain Murad learned traditional line, net, cage, and trawler fishing in his youth. He began his military training as an officer cadet, completing academic and navigational studies at the Sur Naval Training Centre. He subsequently attended Britannia Royal Naval College in Dartmouth, England, graduating with first-class honours. In 2024, Captain Murad received a doctorate in business administration from Kazan Federal University in Kazan, Russia.

== Navy career ==
Captain Murad receiving His Majesty’s Sword of Honour from Sultan Qaboos bin Said

Following his graduation, he joined the Royal Navy of Oman as a junior lieutenant, serving as a navigation and communications officer. During his naval service, he held roles as a gunnery officer, operations officer, and welfare officer. Within five years, he rose through the ranks to serve as captain of a warship and was awarded His Majesty's Sword of Honour. Captain Murad later joined the Merchant Navy, serving aboard merchant vessels trading across the Arab states of the Persian Gulf, Yemen, Iran, and other regions.

== Business career ==
Following his service in the Royal Navy of Oman and subsequent work aboard merchant vessels, Captain Murad pursued a career in the commercial maritime sector. Following the creation of the Sohar Industrial Port Company (SIPC), Captain Murad was appointed harbourmaster for the Port of Sohar in 2003 to oversee vessel and cargo operations at the port. In addition to his work at Sohar Port, he was Oman's representative on the committee responsible for the Rules and Regulations of GCC (Gulf Cooperation Council) Seaports. In 2005, Al Maamari founded Blue Wave Shipping Agency, a maritime company specializing in shipping sector operations. The agency delivers marine consultancy, technical surveys, and full-scale vessel operations.

In May 2017, Captain Murad participated in a 13-member business delegation from the North Al Batinah branch of the Oman Chamber of Commerce and Industry to Minsk, Belarus. He signed a memorandum of understanding on behalf of Omani businesspeople to establish a joint investment company with Belarusian partners.
