= Malek Bin Sulaiman Al Ma'amari =

Omani Chief of Police

Lieutenant General Malek bin Sulaiman Al Ma'amari

Inspector General of Police and Customs of the Royal Oman Police
- Appointed by: Qaboos bin Said
- Succeeded by: Hassan bin Mohsin Al Shraiqi

Malek bin Sulaiman Al Ma'amari is an Omani Lieutenant General and the previous Inspector General of Police and Customs of the Royal Oman Police until 15 March 2011.

== Career ==
=== Royal Oman Police ===
Al Ma'amari was the personal bodyguard of the Sultan Qaboos bin Said in the 1980s and a close aide. A CIA document in March 1985 characterized him as a nationalist with close influence with Qaboos. He was also the Chairman of the National Committee for Civil Defence (NCCD).

On 15 March 2011, Al Ma'amari was dismissed by Qaboos bin Said during the 2011 Oman protests. His dismissal was thought to have stemmed from a failure to contain police forces that fired bullets into a stone throwing crowd on 27 February 2011 which killed one protester in Sohar. It has been reported that at least 6 people died during the protests. He was replaced by Hassan bin Mohsin Al Shraiqi.
