= Globe Roundabout =

Roundabout in Sohar, Oman

Coordinates: 24.351°N 56.732°E

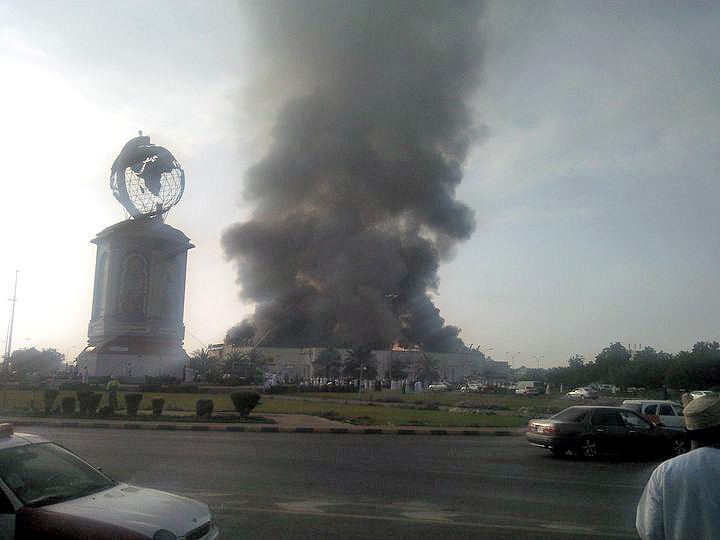
The Globe Roundabout during the Lulu Hypermarket burning as part of the 2011 Omani protests.

Globe Roundabout (or Sohar Roundabout) was an iconic roundabout in the Sultanate of Oman, located in the industrial city of Sohar. The roundabout was the centre of 2011 Omani protests.

== Sohar flyover ==
The roundabout was however demolished in mid-2012 to make way for the upcoming Sohar flyover. The flyover was opened to the public in 2014 and thus, reduced traffic congestion which was an ongoing problem among the residents of Sohar. The project is now completed, enabling efficiency in travelling in and around Sohar.

== See also ==
- Roundabout
- Traffic Circle
