= Ali Bin Majid Al Maamari =

Omani former minister

General: Ali Bin Majid Al Maamari; علي بن ماجد المعمري
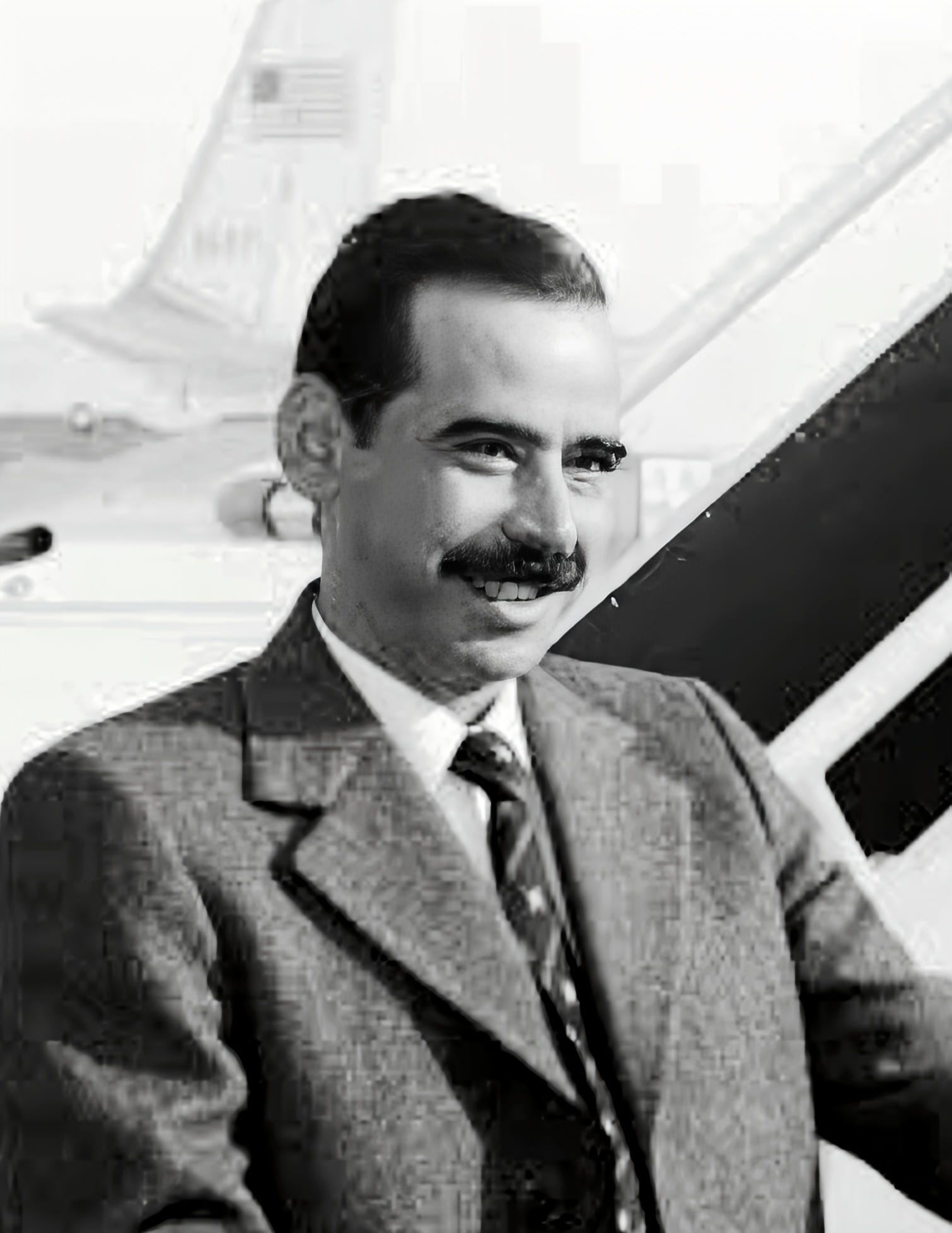
- Ali in the 1980s

Minister of the Palace Office
- In office 1985–2011
- Monarch: Qaboos bin Said
- Prime Minister: Qaboos bin Said
- Succeeded by: Sultan bin Mohammed al Nu'amani

General Ali bin Majid Al Maamari (Arabic: علي بن ماجد المعمري) was a former Omani General who served as the Minister of Royal Office from 1985 to 2011, and was a key advisor to Sultan Qaboos on security issues.

In this capacity, he was responsible not only for supervision of the Armed Forces and national security matters but served as the focal person for all external intelligence coordination and cooperation with foreign agencies. He was removed from office in what is considered a symbolic purge in the wake of the 2011 Arab Spring protests in Oman.
