= Al-Khaburah =

- Location in Oman
- Coordinates: 23.963°N 57.096°E
- Country: Oman
- Subdivision: Al Batinah North Governorate

Population (2010)
  - Total: 42,119

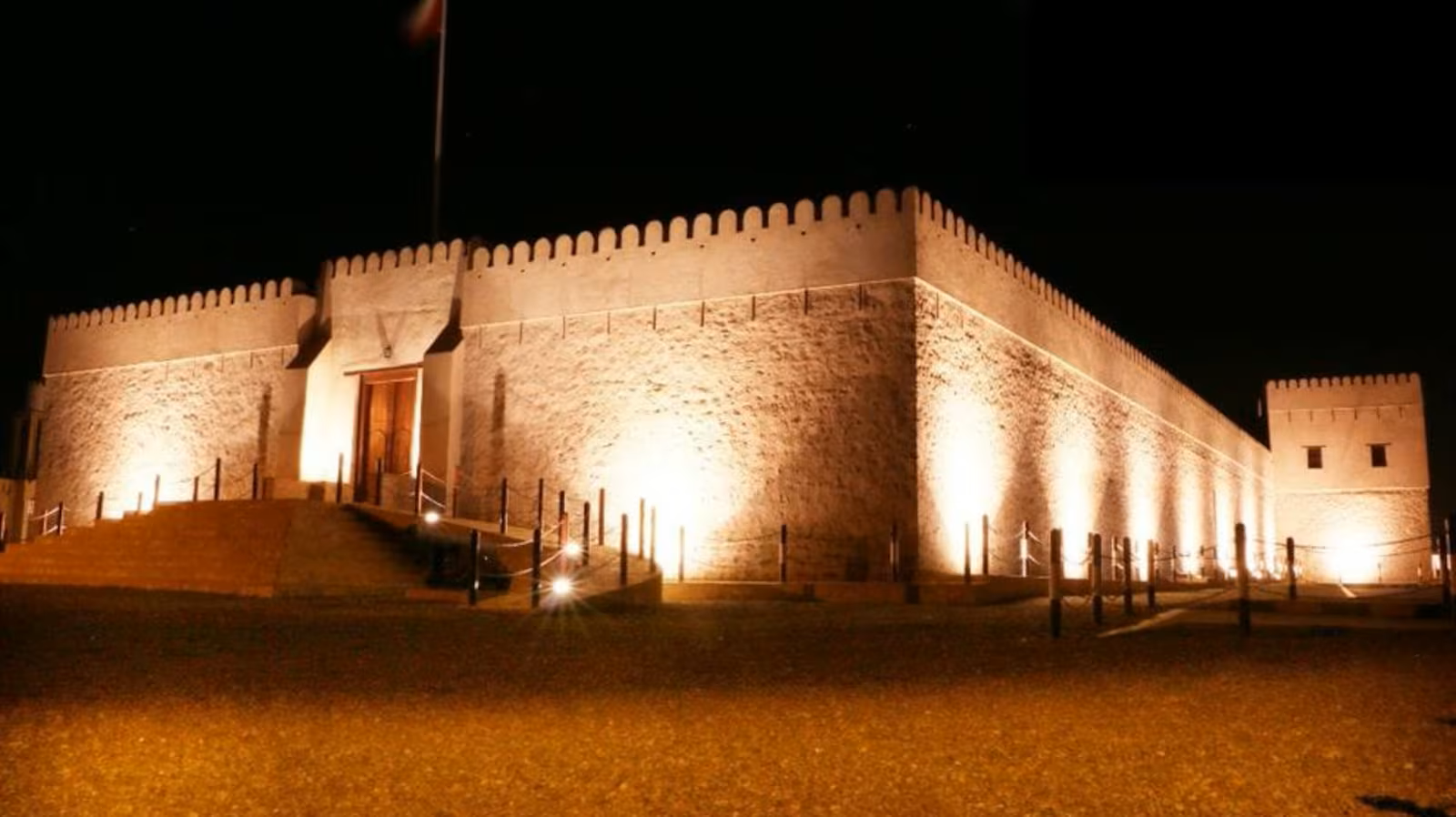
Al-Khaburah Fort

Al-Khaburah (Arabic: الخابورة) is a Wilayah (province) in Al Batinah North Governorate, Oman. As of 2010 it had a population of 42,119.
