= Suleiman Al Maamari =

Omani writer

- Born: 18 January 1974 (age 52)
- Occupations: Writer, journalist
- Writing career
- Notable works: Maybe Because He is a Defeated Man, 1999. Things are Closer Than They Seem in The Mirror, 2005. Who Does Not Like Jamal Abdelnasser, 2013.
- Notable awards: Yusuf Idris Short Stories Competition in 2007.

Suleiman Al Maamari (born 18 January 1974) is an Omani writer and journalist. He is famous for his novel Who Does Not Like Jamal Abdelnasser, his three short stories collection Maybe Because He is a Defeated Man, Things are Closer Than They Seem in The Mirror which won the Yusuf Idris Short Stories Competition, and Shut-Off Abdelfattah Doesn't Like Details. He was the head of The Omani Society for Writers and Literates between 2008 and 2010, and the head of Story Writers Family in Oman between 2007 and 2009. Currently, he is working as the head of the cultural programs department at the Sultanate of Oman Radio.

== Biography ==
Suleiman Al Maamari is a founding member of The Omani Society for Writers and Literates and was the head between 2008 and 2010, and the head of Story Writers Family in Oman between 2007 and 2009. He is head of the cultural programs department at the Sultanate of Oman Radio, some of his most prominent programs are "The Cultural Scene" and "A Book I Like" and "Little Reader". In 2013, Al Maamari wrote his first novel "Who Does Not Like Jamal Abdelnasser". He also participated in many cultural and literary forums in the Arab region.

Al-Maamari contributed in exposing plagiarism and literary theft in the fields of journalism and literature. In 2017, blogging declined, which prompted Al-Maamari to dedicate his Facebook page to uncovering literary plagiarism and discussing plagiarism. He faced some judicial troubles and accusations of defamation and abuse as a result of his leadership of this campaign. Al-Maamari used these accusations as a way to uncover the truth so that the authorities could take the necessary measures against plagiarists and enhance the security of intellectual and literary property. Thanks to Al-Maamari's efforts on Facebook, social media users have increased awareness of the phenomenon of plagiarism, and in turn aroused the interest of newspapers and television stations and prompted them to conduct journalistic investigations and produce television programs on plagiarism.

=== Arrest ===
The Omani security services arrested Al-Maamari on 28 April 2016, where he was arbitrarily arrested without any official reason or explanation. After she received the news of Al-Maamari's arrest, the director of the Middle East office at Reporters Without Borders, Alexandra El-Khazen, asked the authorities to reveal Al-Maamari's whereabouts and reason for his arrest. Several Omani and Arab journalists and writers have expressed their anger at the news of his arrest, likening it to enforced disappearance rather than detention. In cooperation with Reporters Without Borders, Al-Maamari's supporters launched a petition on social media calling on the Omani authorities to give Al-Ma'amari the right to a fair trial or to release him immediately, and he was released.

== Works ==
=== Novels ===
- Who Does Not Like Jamal Abdelnasser, 2013.
- A Dog's Death Certificate, written with Abdulaziz Al Farsi, 2016.

=== Short story collections ===
- Maybe Because He is a Defeated Man, 1999.
- Things are Closer Than They Seem in The Mirror, 2005.
- Close to the Sun- Conversations in Omani Culture, written with Abdulaziz Al Farsi, 2008.
- Not Far From the Moon, written with Abdulaziz Al Farsi, 2008.
- Shut-Off Abdelfattah Doesn't Like Details, 2009.
- A Frond Moves The Sun's Disc, written with Mazin Habib, 2009.
- More than Life, 2012.

== Awards ==
He won the Yusuf Idris Short Stories Competition in 2007 for his short stories collection "Things are Closer Than They Seem in The Mirror".

== See also ==
- Hussein al Abri
- Abdullah Habib
- Huda Hamed
