= Abdullah Habib =

Omani writer and internet activist

- Born: Saham, Oman
- Occupations: Writer, film critic, producer
- Known for: Criticism of Omani government

Abdullah Habib is an Omani writer and internet activist who has been arrested on multiple occasions for criticising the Omani government.

Habib is a writer, film critic and producer. He was first arrested in 2015 and pardoned in 2018.

Born in Saham (northern Oman) in 1964, Habib studied cinema in the United States of America and received a Master's degree in cultural and film studies. He also prepared a thesis for his PhD degree that he was unable to present because of his health conditions. He is a writer and film critic with a wide range of publications ranging from prose, text and film that has exceeded 12 books, as well as five black and white films. He has also participated in many international events and festivals. Habib was one of the intellectuals who participated in and supported the February 2011 protests in Oman.

== Literature work ==
Abdullah Habib has published many books, including:

- Pictures hanging on the night: Attempts in cinema, poetry and narration. Internal version of the Cultural Complex, Abu Dhabi, 1993.
- Sea Shell: In the narrative of some cling. Modern Colors Press. Muscat, 1994.
- Laillamiat. Dar Al Jadid, Beirut, 1994.
- Notes in cinematography, by Robert Bresson (translation), General Establishment of Cinema, Damascus, 1998.
- Parting after Death. Arab Institute for Studies and Publishing, Beirut, 2004.
- Fragments of shapes and contents. Arab Diffusion Foundation, Beirut, 2009.
- Raheel, Arab Diffusion Foundation, Beirut, 2009.
- Cinematic accountability, Arab Publishing Foundation, Beirut, 2009.

== Cinema production ==
Habib had made many short films, including:

- 16 mm, white and black
- Dream
- A poet
- Vision
- Statue
- This is not a pipe
