= Sultan Qaboos Grand Mosque =

Mosque in Muscat, Oman

Sultan Qaboos Grand Masjid
- جَامِع ٱلسُّلْطَان قَابُوْس ٱلْأَكْبَر
- The mosque in 2014

- Location of the mosque in Oman

Religion
- Affiliation: Ibadism
- Ecclesiastical or organisational status: Friday mosque
- Status: Active
- Notable internal features: Carpet and chandeliers

Location
- Location: Muscat, Muscat Governorate
- Country: Oman
- Interactive map of Sultan Qaboos Grand Masjid
- Coordinates: 23°35′02″N 58°23′21″E

Architecture
- Architects: Quad Design with Mohamed Makiya (exterior); Edgard Bali (interior)
- Style: Contemporary Islamic
- General contractor: Carillion Alawi
- Groundbreaking: 1994
- Completed: 2001

Specifications
- Capacity: 20,000 worshipers
- Interior area: 5,476 m^{2} (58,940 sq ft)
- Dome: One
- Dome height (inner): 50 m (160 ft)
- Minaret: 5
- Minaret height: Main: 90 m (300 ft); Flanking: 45.5 m (149 ft)
- Site area: 31,600 m^{2} (340,000 sq ft)
- Materials: Sandstone

The Sultan Qaboos Grand Mosque (Arabic: جَامِع ٱلسُّلْطَان قَابُوْس ٱلْأَكْبَر, romanized: Jāmiʿ As-Sulṭān Qābūs Al-Akbar) is a Friday mosque located in Muscat, the capital city of the Sultanate of Oman. Completed in 2001 in a contemporary Islamic style, it is the largest mosque in the country and can accommodate 20,000 worshipers.

== Architecture ==
=== Construction ===
In 1992, the then Sultan of Oman, Qaboos bin Said Al Said, directed that his country should have a Grand Mosque. In 1993, a competition for the design of the proposed mosque took place. The building contract was awarded to Carillion Alawi LLC. Construction commenced in December 1994, after a site was chosen at Bausher, and it took six years and seven months to build the mosque.

The mosque is made of different type of stones, with doors, windows and embellishments made of wood and glass. Approximately 270,000 tonnes (300,000 short tons) of Indian sandstone was imported for the building. Five minarets were built around the premises of the mosque: the main minaret is 90 metres (300 ft) high, and the four flanking minarets are 45.5 metres (149 ft) high. Together, they are the mosque’s chief visual features from the exterior. In the interior, the main musalla is the focus of both prayer and tourism. The 5,476-square-metre (58,940 sq ft) square prayer hall has a central dome that is 50 metres (160 ft) above the floor. The dome is embellished spectacularly from the inside and it is a major tourist attraction. The main musalla can hold over 6,500 worshippers, while the women's musalla can accommodate 750 worshipers. The outer sahn can hold 8,000 worshipers and there is additional space available in the interior courtyard and the passageways, making a total capacity of up to 20,000 worshipers.

The mosque is built on a site occupying 416,000 square metres (4,480,000 sq ft), and the complex extends to cover an area of more than 40,000 square metres (430,000 sq ft). The Grand Mosque was inaugurated by Sultan of Oman on May 4, 2001 to celebrate 30 years of his reign.

=== Interior ===
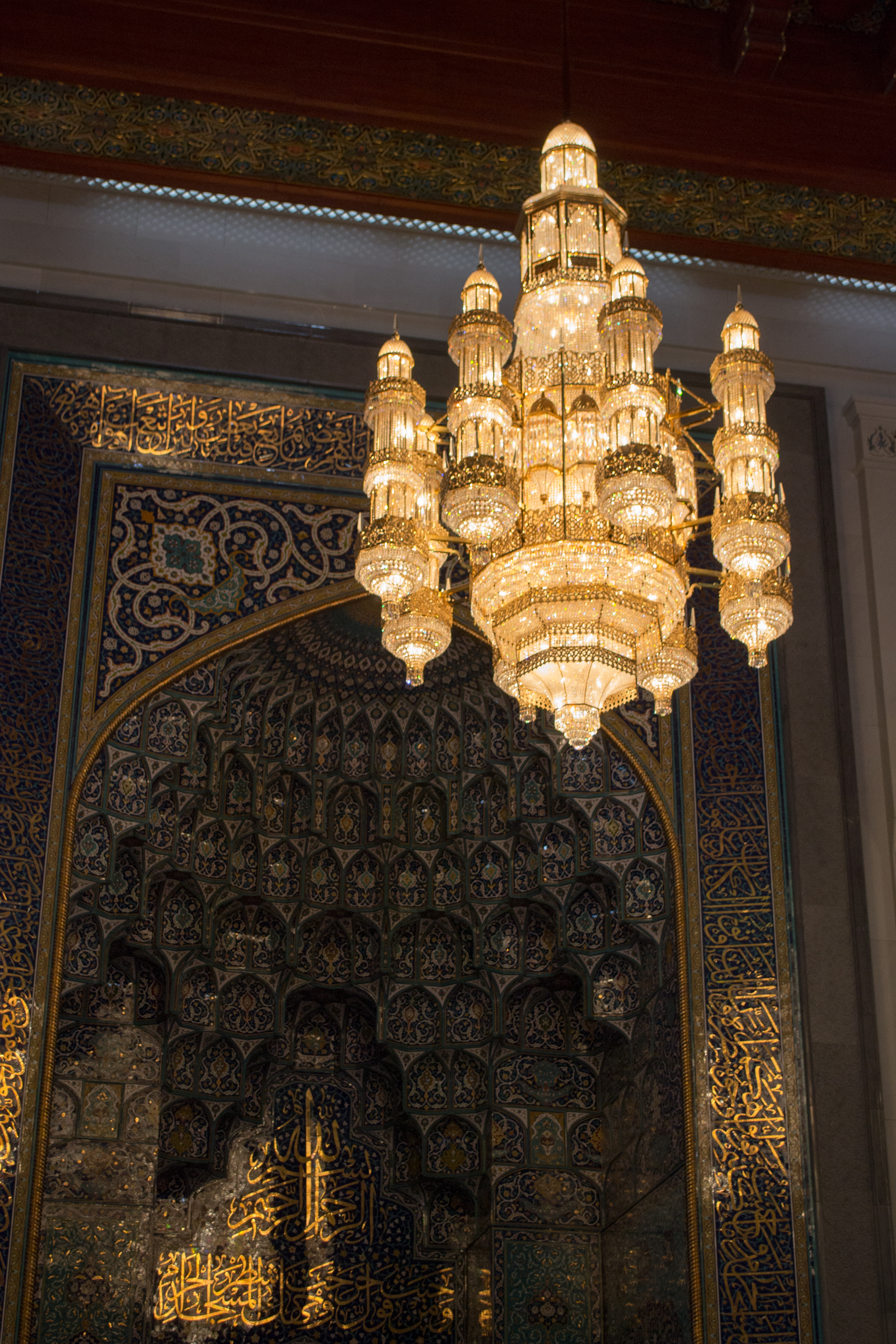
The chandelier in the prayer hall

A major feature of the design of the interior is the prayer carpet which covers the floor of the prayer hall. It contains 1.7 million knots, weighs 21 tonnes (21 long tons; 23 short tons) and took four years to produce with over 600 workers. The carpet brings together the classical Persian Tabriz, Kashan and Isfahan design traditions. 28 colors in varying shades were used, the majority obtained from traditional vegetable dyes. It was the largest single-piece carpet in the world, until 2018, when the Sheikh Zayed Grand Mosque in Abu Dhabi, the UAE was completed. This Muscat hand-woven carpet was produced by Iran Carpet Company (ICC) at the order of the Diwan of the Royal Court of Sultanate. The carpet measures over 70 by 60 metres (230 by 200 feet), and covers the floor of the 4,343-square-metre (46,750 sq ft) prayer hall.

The 14-metre-high (46 ft) chandelier was manufactured by the Italian company Faustig. Since the mosque is 90 metres (300 feet) high, the chandelier looks proportional, and it was the world's largest chandelier, prior to the 2018 completion of the Sheikh Zayed Mosque in Abu Dhabi. The Muscat chandelier weighs 7.7 tonnes (8.5 short tons), includes 600,000 crystals, 1,122 halogen bulbs complete with a dimming system, and includes a staircase for maintenance within the chandelier. Thirty-four smaller chandeliers of the same design are hung in other parts of the building.

== Gallery ==
View of the minaret from the entrance

The mihrab

The chandelier in the main prayer hall

Corridor

Carpet

Electric lighting

Window design

Detail of the inner dome

== See also ==
- Islam in Oman
- List of mosques in Oman
