= Sohar University =

Private university in Oman

- جامعة صحار
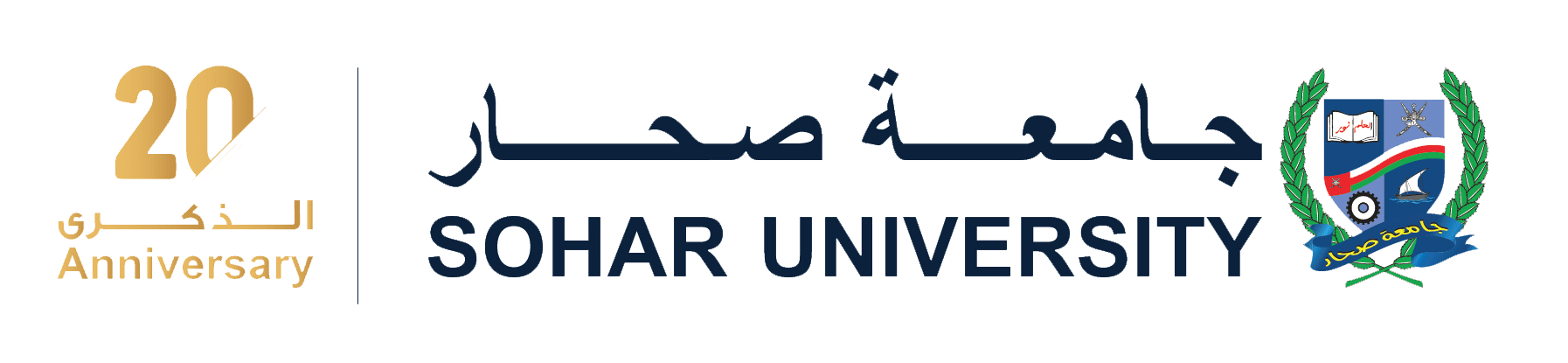
- Type: Private
- Established: 2001; 25 years ago
- Vice-Chancellor: Dr Hamdan Sulaiman Al Fazari
- Faculty: 184 (2022/2023)
- Students: 7119 (2022/2023)
- Location: Sohar, 311, Oman; 24.2979°N 56.7803°E
- Website: su.edu.om

Sohar University (جامعة صحار) was established in 2001 as the first private university in Oman.

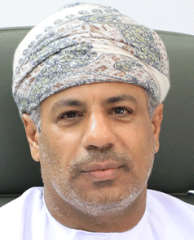
The Vice-Chancellor, Hamdan Sulaiman Al Fazari

The university is located in Sohar, an industrial city with a port and free zone, close to the border with the United Arab Emirates.

Sohar University is composed of six colleges: the College of Business Administration, the College of Computer and Information Technology, the College of Education and Arts, the College of Engineering, the College of Linguistic Studies, and the College of Law. Overall, the university has 31 Bachelors programs, 23 Masters programs, an MBA program, and six PhD programs.

University rankings

Global – Overall
- QS World: 951-1000 (2026)

== Campus expansion ==
In 2008, Queensland-based Noel Robinson Architects (NRA) was appointed to design the new 120 million Australian dollar Sohar University campus. Buildings include a new library, sporting facilities, multi-purpose lecture theatres, a graduation hall, faculty buildings for engineering, business, health sciences, social sciences and humanities, administration, student services, and postgraduate residences. NRA collaborated with the University of Queensland during the design of the campus buildings.

== See also ==
- List of universities and colleges in Oman
