= Internal Security Service =

Omani national security agency

Sultanate of Oman Internal Security Service
- جهاز الأمن الداخلي

Agency overview
- Jurisdiction: Government of Oman and its national security (internal)
- Headquarters: Qurum, Muscat Governate, Sultanate of Oman
- Agency executive: Lt Gen Said bin Ali al Hilali, Head of ISS

Internal Security Service (ISS; Arabic: جهاز الأمن الداخلي, transliterated: Jahaz al Amn al Dakhly) is the national security agency of the Sultanate of Oman. The agency focuses solely upon domestic security while foreign intelligence operations is specifically handled by the Palace Office, which controls external security and coordinates all intelligence and security policies.

The stated overall purpose of ISS is to investigates all matters related to internal security. The ISS also leads on Omani counter terrorism procedures and outreach activities.

== History ==
The ISS can trace its history back to the intelligence and security structures set up using British military intelligence expertise as part of Sultan Said's armed forces in the 1950s. HM Sultan Qaboos developed the capability, and the Oman Intelligence Service became the Oman Research Department (ORD), with its main focus being supporting counter-insurgency operations in the Dhofar Region in the 1970s. The ORD was re-titled the ISS in 1987.

The ISS is known to have offices in Qurum (in the Capital area) and Salalah in Dhofar.

In 1994 and 2005 there were attempted coups against the Sultan's rule and the ISS would have been instrumental in uncovering and investigating the plots.

== Organization ==
As of May 2013, Lieutenant General Said bin Ali bin Zahir al Hilali was appointed Head of the ISS – he had formerly been the assistant head of the agency. He was still in post as of November 2015. His former post was passed to Brigadier Ghosn bin Hilal bin Khalifa al Alawi (who was promoted to major general on assuming the post of Assistant Head ISS). Lieutenant General Said al Hilali's brother is the Sultanate's Public Prosecutor, who was reported in 2012 to be ready to use the law to restrict freedom of speech and association.
