= Sultan bin Mohammed al Nu'amani =

Omani minister

General: Sultan bin Mohammed al Nu'amani; سلطان بن محمد النعماني
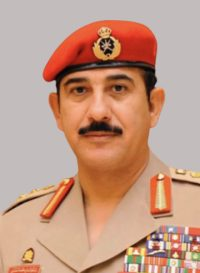

Minister of Royal Office
- Incumbent
- Assumed office 11 March 2011
- Monarchs: Qaboos bin Said; Haitham bin Tariq
- Prime Minister: Qaboos bin Said; Haitham bin Tariq
- Preceded by: Ali Bin Majid Al Maamari

General Sultan bin Mohammed al Nu'amani (Arabic: سلطان بن محمد النعماني) is the Minister of Royal Office of the Sultanate of Oman since March 2011. He is also the acting chairman of the Defence Council. Al Nu'amani was entrusted to open the will of Sultan Qaboos upon his death, which contained the name of Qaboos's successor, Haitham bin Tariq.
