= Harmul =

Village in Oman

Harmul Ḩarmūl (حرمول) Harmool
- Village
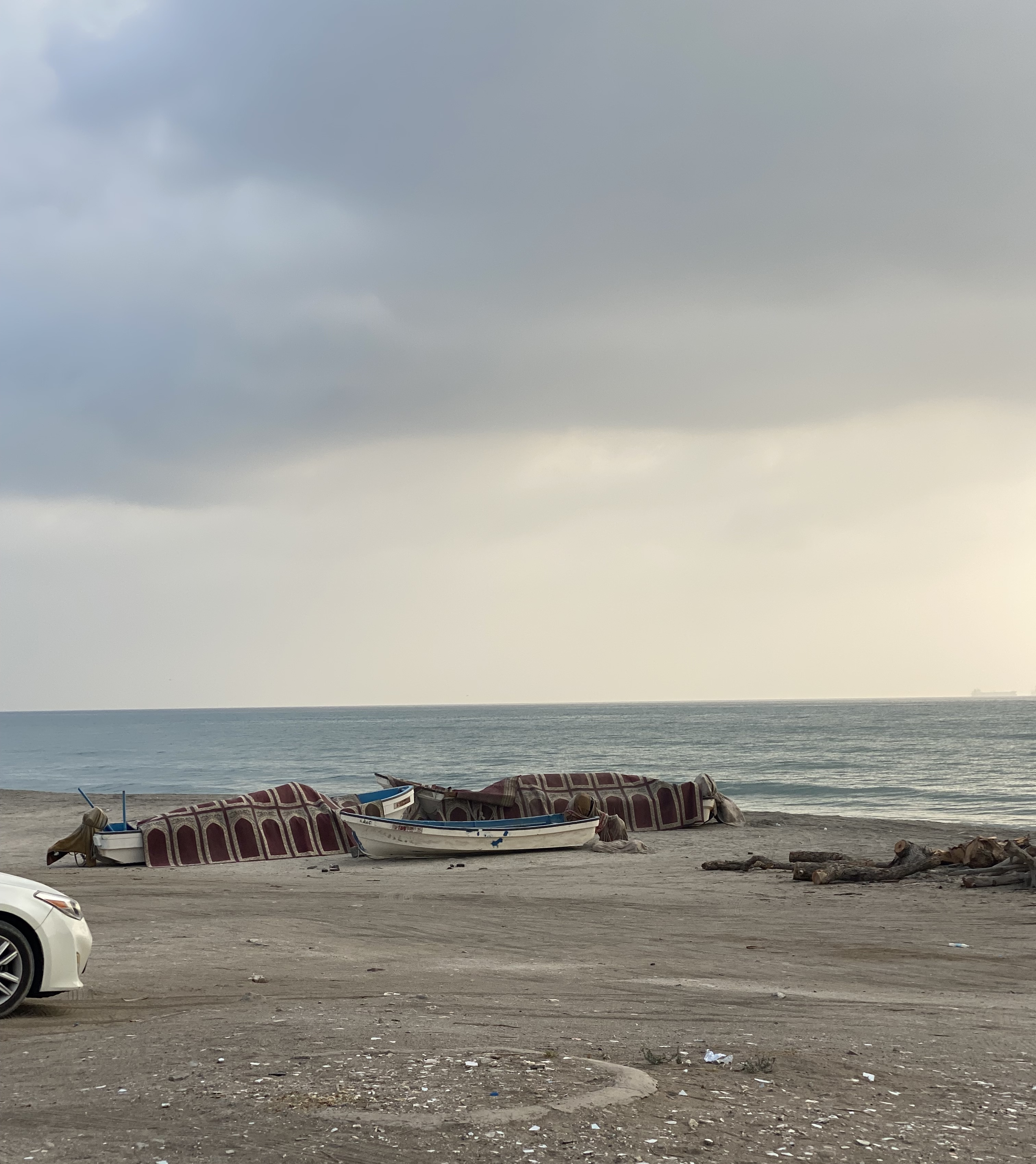
- A view of the village’s beach with fishing boats.

- Location in Oman Harmul (Middle East) Harmul (West and Central Asia)
- Coordinates: 24.5261°N 56.5939°E
- Country: Oman
- Governorate: Al Batinah North

Area
  - Total: 4.225 km^{2} (1.631 sq mi)

Population (2020)
  - Total: 2,293
- Time zone: UTC+4 (Gulf Standard Time)

Harmul (Arabic: حرمول, romanized: Ḩarmūl) also known as Harmool, is a village located in the beach of the Wilayah (province) of Liwa, North Al Batinah Governorate in the Sultanate of Oman. Its population is estimated at 2,293 people.

== Graffiti ==
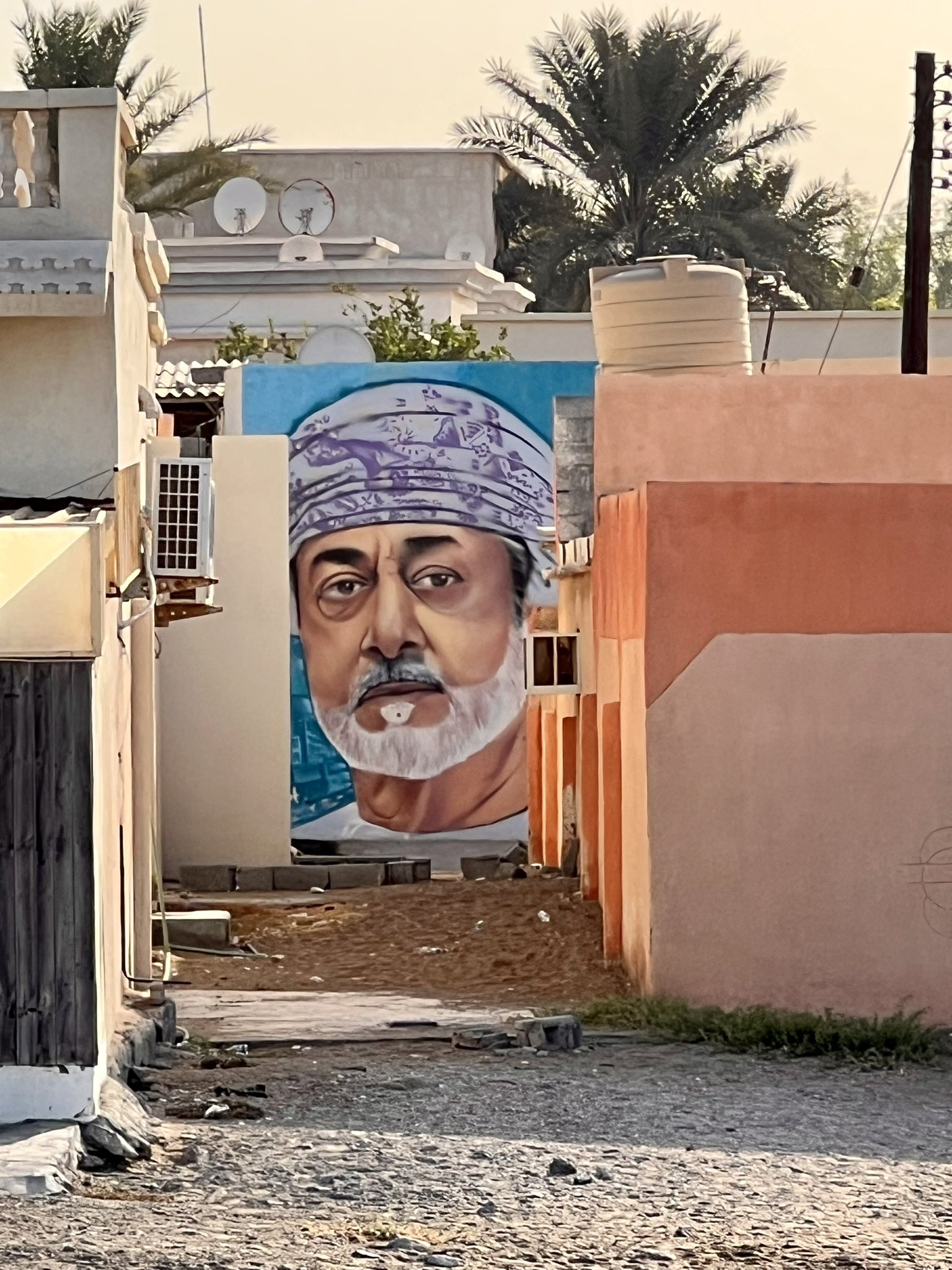
Graffiti of Sultan Haitham Bin Tariq, made by Abdulmajeed.

Harmul is known for its unique graffiti art, made by local artist Abdulmajeed Mohammed Salim al Mamari, often painted on walls around the village. According to Muscat Daily, “Al Mamari believes his graffiti art, done in several prominent locations around Harmul, adds value to the sites and helps promote tourism.”

== Notable people ==
- Murad Al Maamari, Omani businessman and former naval officer
