= Qurum =

- Suburb of Muscat
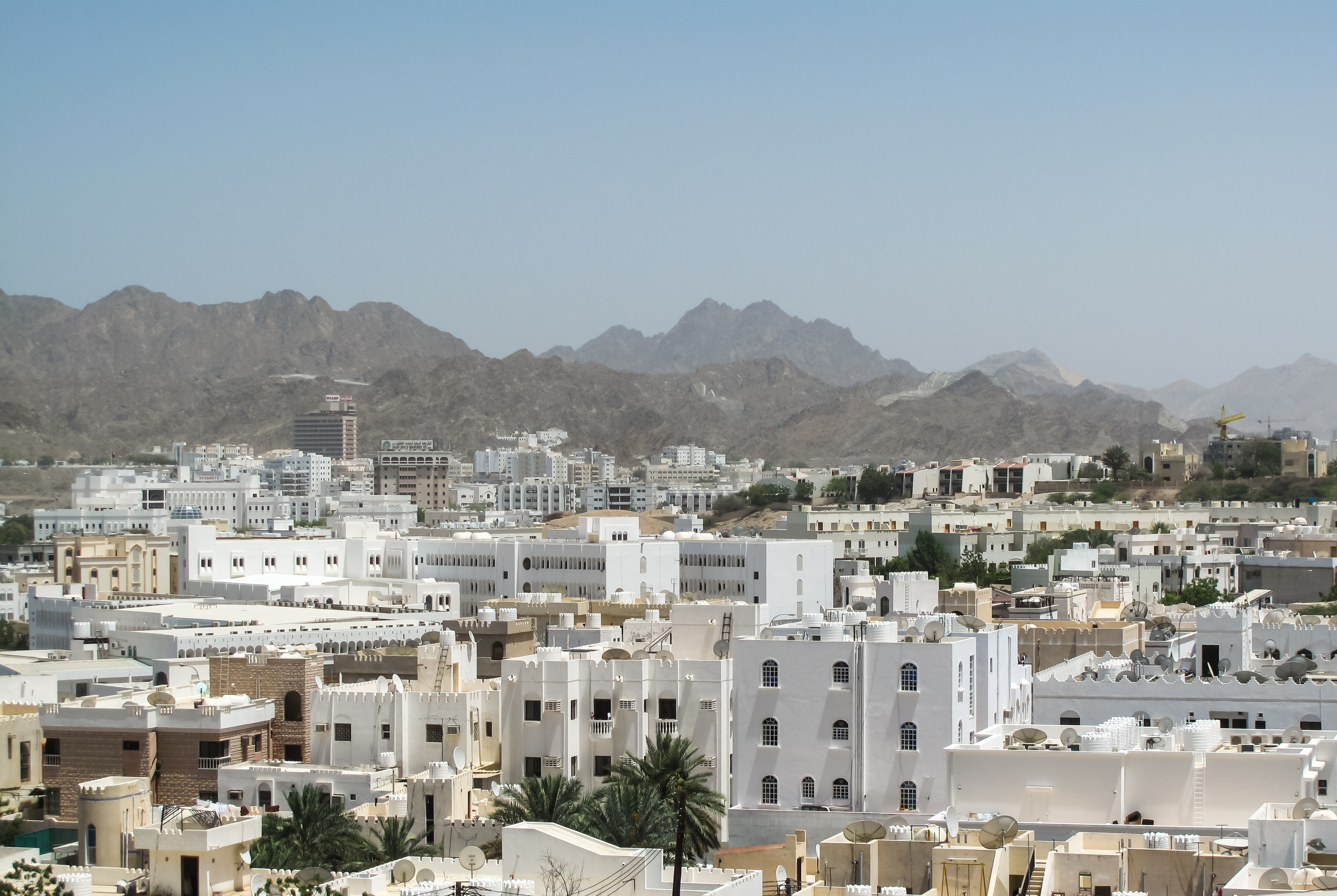
- View from Al Qurum Heights Road

- Location in Oman
- Coordinates: 23°37′00″N 58°29′41″E
- Country: Oman
- Governorate: Muscat Governorate
- Wilayat: Muttrah

Qurum (Arabic: القرم, romanized: al-Qurum; also written Qurm) is an upscale suburb of Muscat in Oman.

Its main attractions are the Qurum Natural Park, the Qurum City Centre and the Qurum Beach.

== Qurm Nature Reserve ==
Qurum is the site of Qurm Nature Reserve, a national nature reserve protecting a coastal wetland surrounding a forest of grey mangroves. The reserve was declared in 1975 by a decree of Sultan Qaboos bin Said, and it became Oman's first Ramsar site in 2013.

== Economy ==
The $600 million Muriya and $129 million Al Kuwair retail developments are located in Qurum.

== Qurum City Centre ==
Majid Al Futtaim opened Qurum City Centre (QCC) – located in the Qurum district of Muscat – in October 2008. QCC includes 75 shops with a total gross leasable area of 20,600 square metres and parking for around 1,200 cars. Both malls are anchored by Carrefour, the French hypermarket. The footfall at MCC in 2007 totalled 8m, up 5% over 2006, according to MCC's marketing manager, Ahmed Hamdy. The property's general manager, Ibrahim Al Qasmi, said that he was looking to increase footfall at the MCC to 10m in 2008.

== Marah Land ==
Marah Land is a tourist attraction and is a destination for school trips. Children entering the premises are expected to be joyful or go home. Marah Land hosts the popular annual cancer walk where school children learn about helping society and making a difference, as well as, raising awareness of global issues.
