= Liwa, Oman =

Liwa Luwā (لوى)
- Wilayah
- Liwa Fort

- Location In Oman Liwa (Middle East) Liwa (West and Central Asia)
- Coordinates: 24.51°N 56.57°E
- Country: Oman
- Governorate: Al Batinah North Governorate

Government
  - Sultan: Haitham bin Tariq
  - Wāli: Sheikh Hilal bin Sultan Al Kalbani

Population (2025)
  - Total: 65,291
- Time zone: UTC+4 (+4)

Liwa (Standard Arabic: لوى, romanized: Luwā; Gulf Arabic pronunciation: [ˈlu.wə]) is a wilayah (province) in the Al Batinah North Governorate of Oman. Located near the border with the United Arab Emirates on the Gulf of Oman, It borders the wilayats of Shinas to the north, Mahdah to the west, and Sohar to the south. Liwa is approximately 277 kilometers from the capital Muscat and the second province away from the border to the United Arab Emirates. As of 2025, the wilayah had a population of 65,291.

== Geography ==
Liwa is located in the northern part of the Al Batinah North Governorate of Oman and is the second-to-last wilayah away from the border with the United Arab Emirates. It is bordered to the north by the Wilayat of Shinas, to the south by the Wilayat of Sohar, and to the west by the Wilayat of Mahdah in the Al Buraimi Governorate. It extends over an area of 925 km^{2} (357.16 square miles), distributed over 51 villages, the most important of which is the administrative center of Liwa Al-Jadīdah (Arabic: لوى الجديدة, lit. 'New Liwa') where most of the Wilayah's residents live.

Liwa is distinguished by its diverse natural terrain, ranging from sea to plains and from mountains to valleys. Characterised by its abundance of fresh water, the Wilayah has hot, humid weather in the summer and moderately cold weather in the winter. Rainfall is generally scarce and irregular, although sometimes it falls in heavy quantities. However, these short-lived rains are sufficient to create a wide-ranging system of water-bearing layers in the areas below the mountains, which are connected to the coastal areas and mountain slopes.

== Etymology ==
Liwa in Arabic derives from the word for "swirl," and the province was allegedly named Liwa because the fronds of palm trees swirled around its central fort. In another interpretation, it was said it was attributed to the gathering of military banners due to the many wars fought there, as it was a place where many armies met.

== History ==
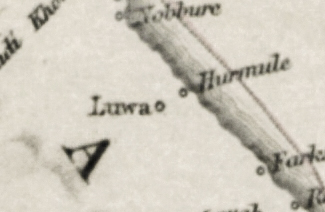
Liwa on an 1838 map of Oman, written as “Luwa”

Liwa contains many historical landmarks, especially forts, with the most famous one being Liwa Fort. The fort is located on a hill in the middle of the province, and contains five towers and a small castle in the middle known as Al-Qasaba. Historically, this fort was regarded as the center of Liwa, and the headquarters of the mayor and local administration. Liwa also includes a number of tourist attractions represented in a number of water springs, streams, and caves, such as Al Azm water spring. There is also Abu Kahf Mountain, where the most famous caves in Liwa lie. Traditional boats made of palm frond are considered the wilayahs emblem, as they connect modern history with ancient history, which symbolizes the residents undertaking fishing as their profession and source of living.

=== Prehistory ===
Despite the arid climate, human settlement has existed in Liwa since prehistoric times, evidenced by the quantitative analysis of mineral waste at the sites of the Al-Arja and Al-Bayda villages in Wadi Rahab in the wilayah. Excavations and analysis of mineral waste at Al-Arja indicate that copper-smelting was extensively practised there towards the end of the third millennium BC. The process involved the use of ceramic crucibles, in which successive layers of carbon-rich ore and charcoal were possibly stacked and heated. The resulting masses were then broken into smaller pieces to extract the copper. Evidence also suggests that more advanced furnaces were used for copper smelting during the early Islamic period.

=== Medieval period ===
==== Nabhani dynasty ====
Liwa appears in the poetry of Al-Kidhawi in praise of Arar bin Falah bin Muhsin, a king of the Nabhani dynasty who reigned between 1610-1615 AD, His mention of Liwa comes through an account of a large battle that took place there, in which Arar triumphed over an attempted invasion by the Portuguese.

ويوم لوى لما قضى الله أنه بملقى أعاديه سيجري له النصر أتته بنو الأعجام تزحف بالضحى جيوشا يضيق السهل عنهن والوعر وقد برزت من خدرها كل غادة وعادتها ألا يفارقها الخدر وصحن العذارى يا أبا الطيب هل ترى فكر كما انقض الشهاب من السما ولم يثنه عن ذاك خوف ولا ذعر	And on the day of Liwa, when god decreed that when he would meet his enemies, victory would be his The foreigners came to him, marching at dawn in armies so vast that the plains and mountains could not contain them And every maiden emerged from her seclusion though it was her custom to never leave it The young women cried out “O Abu al-Tayyib, do you see any escape for us, now that our plight has become desperate?” Then he charged forth like a meteor plunging from the sky Neither fear nor panic deterred him from that

==== Ya'aruba dynasty ====
During the seventeenth century, Liwa was among the fortified settlements on the Batinah coast during the period of conflict between Omani forces and the Portuguese, who had established positions at several coastal locations. Following the expulsion of the Portuguese from much of northern Al Batinah by Nasir bin Murshid, Liwa remained one of the last Portuguese-aligned strongholds. After Muhammad bin Ja'far al-Jabri, the ruler of Liwa Fort, was killed, his son Saif bin Muhammad succeeded him with Portuguese support. Divisions among Liwa's allies weakened the resistance, and after a six-month siege Saif surrendered the fort to Nasir's forces.

== Architecture and heritage ==
=== Liwa Fort ===
Liwa Fort

Liwa Fort is one of the wilayat's most famous historic landmarks. It stands on a low hill near Harmul, approximately 1.5 kilometres from Liwa Al Jadidah. The fort is distinguished by its position inland from the coast, surrounded by houses and date palms.

The fort is reported to be more than 400 years old. It contains a high perimeter wall, five observation towers and a central structure known as the qasaba. The complex also includes wells and rooms associated with its former residential and administrative functions. Its elevated position allowed the surrounding settlements to be observed from the towers.

Historically, the fort served as a defensive structure and the residence of the wali. It was also a place where the wali, judge, sheikhs and local dignitaries met to discuss administrative matters and resolve disputes. The main entrance was traditionally known as the al-sabah, while a guest room or meeting space was known as the sablah.

The Ministry of Heritage and Culture undertook restoration work on the fort between 2000 and 2003. The restored complex includes a theatre used for cultural and national events.

=== Fazah Fort ===
Fazah Fort stands on a plateau in the village of Fazah, surrounded by mountains. The Ministry of Information dates its construction to 1681, during the rule of the Ya'aruba imam Saif bin Sultan. The fort was used as a centre for governing the village and managing local affairs.

The rectangular structure is built from traditional materials including stone and saruj, a type of lime-based mortar. It has three floors and a circular defensive tower. The ground floor contained rooms used to store weapons, gunpowder and provisions; the second floor served as an administrative meeting space known as the mubarraz; and the upper floor provided accommodation for the ruler. The tower was used for defensive observation.

== Arts ==
Liwa is also famous of various popular arts, such as: Al Razfa, also known as the Yowlah or Al-ʿayyalah, Al Hamasiya, Al Wana, Al Tariq, Al Mawlid, and Al Maqyad. In the village of Harmul, located in Liwa, graffiti art created by local artist Abdulmajeed Mohammed Salim al Mamari is frequently painted on walls across the village.

== Notable people ==
- Hazza Al Balushi (born 1995), Quran reciter
- Talib Al Mamari (born 1972), politician & human rights activist
- Murad Al Maamari, Omani businessman and former naval officer
