= 2011 Omani protests =

- Part of the Arab Spring
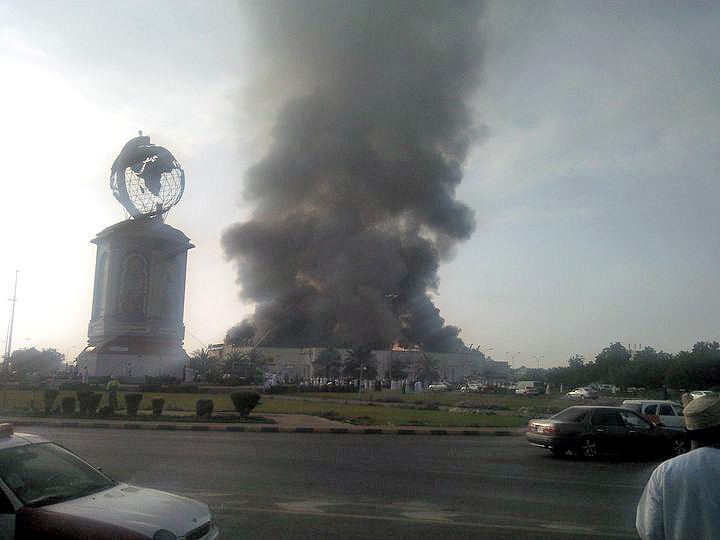
- Protesters set Sohar's Lulu Hypermarket ablaze on 28 February 2011.
- Date: 17 January 2011 – 8 April 2011 (2 months, 3 weeks and 1 day)
- Location: Oman
- Goals: Salary increases; Lower living costs; Jobs; Less corruption
- Methods: Demonstrations; Riots; Sit-ins
- Concessions: Dismissal of 10 ministers of the Cabinet by Sultan Qaboos bin Said

Parties
Omani protesters	Government of Oman; Royal Oman Police; Royal Army of Oman; Royal Guard of Oman; Internal Security Service

Lead figures
No centralized leadership	Qaboos bin Said

Casualties
- Deaths: 6–10
- Injuries: 20

The 2011 Omani protests (also called the Omani Spring) were a series of protests in Oman that occurred as part of the Arab Spring. Protesters demanded salary increases, lower living costs, the creation of more jobs and a reduction in corruption.

In Sohar, Oman's fifth-largest city, protests centered on the Globe Roundabout.

== Issues ==
Protesters demanded salary increases and lower costs of living. On 20 February 2011, protesters welcomed a move by the government to increase the minimum wage. The wage increase targeted Omani workers in the private sector. Public sector Omani employees have received wage increases in the past, but the private sector was so far overlooked. The Government of Oman raised minimum wages for an estimated 150,000 private sector employees to $520 from $364 a month. As protests continued in Sohar the demands were still jobs and political reforms. The protesters also want more jobs, freedom of expression, less government control over the media, political reforms, better living conditions, an abolition of taxes and the trial of all ministers.

Protesters in Muscat also demanded cabinet ministers not serve more than four years. In several other protests, Omanis furthered their demands by calling for a reduction of foreign workers in order to provide more jobs for Omani citizens by private companies.

== Anti-government protests ==
=== Muscat protests ===
About 200 protesters marched on 17 January demanding salary increases and lower costs of living. The protest surprised international observers, who have viewed Oman as a "politically stable and sleepy country." Renewed protests termed as the Green March, occurred on 18 February, inspired by the serious unrest in fellow Persian Gulf state Bahrain. 350 people took part in the march, demanding an end to corruption and better distribution of oil revenue. The protesters also carried signs with slogans of support for the Sultan. Police did not intervene in the gathering, and later after the protest took place, Sayyid Ali bin Hamoud bin Ali Al Busaidi, minister of the Diwan of Royal Court, announced that he had handed over the petition calling for reforms submitted by those who participated in the Green March to Sultan Qaboos bin Said.

On 1 March, about 50 protesters held a sit-in as well outside the Consultative Assembly to demand political reform and an end to corruption. The group later grew to over 400 people. Protesters also continued to demand the Consultative Assembly be turned into a "real parliament." The protests were reported to be "peaceful, well-organised and very disciplined." Tents had been set up with separate accommodations for men and women. Placards with protest slogans had also been translated into English, French and German for the international media.

On 2 April, dozens of protesters staged a sit-in in Muscat, outside the chief prosecutor's office, to demand probes into alleged state abuses after clashes with security forces a day earlier.

=== Sohar protests ===
On 26 February, nearly 500 protesters gathered around a shopping mall in the industrial city of Sohar, 230 kilometres from the capital Muscat. The protesters stopped traffic and shoppers around the mall premises. The shops in the area including the mall remained closed on 27 February as well.

On 27 February, protesters returned in Sohar for a second day, hurling stones at security forces who had cordoned them off. The Royal Oman Police eventually used tear gas and rubber bullets to contain and disperse the protesters. According to witnesses, two protesters were killed.

On 28 February, protesters looted and burned a hypermarket in Sohar. The demonstrators also blocked the entrance to Sohar port, where 160,000 barrels of oil derived products are exported. On 1 March protests continued for a fourth day as crowds in Sohar congregated at the Globe Roundabout. Eventually, the Omani army, backed by tanks, peacefully dispersed protesters blocking the Sohar port and cleared them from the main coastal highway linking Muscat to Sohar. The troops later pulled back, though five armoured vehicles continued to watch the square. The Globe Roundabout had been the site of up to 2,000 demonstrators over the past three days.

After reports of multiple deaths, the minister of health of Oman claimed only one person had been killed and 20 wounded.

A Facebook page entitled "March 2 Uprising for Dignity and Freedom" called for further protests in all parts of Oman, beginning on 2 March, and it attracted more than 2,300 users. However, protests only occurred at the Globe Roundabout in Sohar with a smaller crowd of 50 protesters who blockaded the area. Some people had organised community policing groups to prevent more damage. The army also issued a red alert to vacate the area or threatened action. The 'Sohar Citizen Committee' as it was called had started giving out numbers of its core members to people who could call upon it in case of an emergency or riots attack.

On 30 March, The Director of Public Prosecutions issued a statement saying that complaints were filed by some citizens about acts of rioting, vandalism and breach of public order, destruction of public and private properties, obstructing business transactions and hindering easy movement of people on the streets. Based on these complaints, he gave orders to arrest and clear all the protesters from the Globe Roundabout. The Omani army then stormed the Globe Roundabout clearing blockades and arresting a number of the protesters.

On 1 April, following Friday prayers, hundreds of protesters took to streets demanding the release of people detained in the Public Prosecution crackdowns. The military has also stationed units around government offices and other key buildings in the city. At least one person was reported to have been killed in clashes between police and demonstrators The Public Prosecutor said that the army responded to the protests which had initially started off as a demonstration demanding the release of over 100 protesters detained by authorities three days before but he alleged that later involved knives and stones amidst violence that led to the arrests of 50–60 of the demonstrators. Six others were also badly injured in the incident which had initially started off as a peaceful demonstration demanding the release of over 100 protesters detained by authorities three days before.

On 8 April, the Public Prosecutor's office release details and photographs of those who had been arrested. The same day, though rumours had abounded that a large number of protesters, including women and children, would take to the streets of Sohar after Friday prayers, there were no reports of protests in the local media after the Omani Army took control of the city setting-up multiple checkpoints and making arrests of protest leaders.

=== Other protests ===
On 5 March, protests in the country have spread to Haima, a key oil region about 500 km (310 mi) southwest of the capital Muscat, with oil workers staging a sit-in and calling for more government investment in the area. There were also protests in Ibri during the month.

On 6 May, protesters returned to the streets in Salalah after Friday prayers calling for democratic reform and an end to corruption. The activists and protesters have reiterated their demands for the sacked ministers to be investigated. This was the fourth consecutive Friday to be marked by protests in Salalah. Police broke up a protest camp in Salalah on 12 May, arresting possibly over 100 demonstrators. Several dozen more protesters were attacked by baton-wielding gendarmes and arrested the next day and early into the morning of 14 May while they were demanding jobs and higher pay. The Muscat Daily reported that protesters clashed with the army in Salalah's central Al Nahda Street following the first wave of arrests. The army then fired into the air and also used tear gas to disperse the stone-throwing crowds.

There were also peaceful protests in various colleges in Oman demanding the reducing of pass grades in some colleges. It had affected the classes in those colleges.

== Pro-government rallies ==
On 1 March a rally was organised in Muscat to show support for the Sultan and his government. There were accusations that the government itself organised the rally, though at least some support was a "part genuine outpouring of affection for the sultan." However, multiple SMS were sent from the state-owned Omantel network during the nights preceding the protests, urging loyalists to attend.

There were also continuous reports, mostly from Twitter, that supporters of the government drove around Muscat in large motorcades of up to 200 cars.

In early March, rallies in support of the Sultan continued to be staged.

== Responses ==
=== Domestic ===
On 18 February, it was reported that Sultan of Oman cancelled his visit to India as a result of the unrest in the Arab world, at the same date as "Green March" protest in Muscat happened.

On 26 February, Sultan Qaboos reshuffled the cabinet in response to the domestic protests. The Consultative Assembly is elected by voters across 61 districts, but works in a purely advisory capacity and has no legislative powers. The cabinet reshuffle saw Mohammed bin Nasser al-Khasibi named commerce and industry minister, Hamoud bin Faisal al-Bousaidi as civil service minister and Madiha bint Ahmed bin Nasser as education minister. Sheikh Mohammed bin Abdullah al-Harthy, the outgoing civil service minister, was appointed to head the environment ministry, while Maqboul bin Ali bin Sultan was appointed the new transport minister and Mohsen bin Mohammed al-Sheikh became tourism minister. Protesters had called upon the Sultan to remove Maqbool Bin Ali Bin Sultan from the post of commerce minister as they viewed him as corrupt and inadequate for the task of running the ministry. The Sultan also announced benefits for the students of Higher College of Technology. The students whose homes are 100 km away from the place of study, would be given 90 Omani rial allowances while those living at a less than 100-km distance would get 25-rial allowance. The Royal decree issued stated the reason for the rise in these stipends as "to achieve further development and provide a decent living."

The Diwan of Royal Court, on the orders of the sultan, decided to set up an independent authority for consumer protection in the country. It had also been decided to study the possibility of establishing cooperative societies in the country which did not allow for formation of political parties. There were also confirmed plans to reduce the percentage contribution of civil servants in the Civil Employees Pension Fund from eight percent to seven percent of the monthly basic salary, adding to it 75 percent of the housing, electricity and water allowances.

On 28 February, Sultan Qaboos pledged to create 50,000 government jobs, provide a monthly benefit of $390 to the unemployed and ordered a committee to draft proposals for boosting the power of an elected council that advises him on state affairs. He also promised that a legislative council would be given more powers. On 5 March, Sultan Qaboos replaced two more ministers. Khaled bin Hilal bin Saud al-Busaidi replaced Sayed Ali bin Hamoud al-Busaidi as a minister of the royal court and Sultan bin Mohammed al-Numani replaced General Ali bin Majid al-Maamari as minister in the sultan's office.

On 7 March, Sultan Qaboos issued eight royal decrees including, reshuffling once again the council of ministers and allowing for the formation of a state audit committee. Royal Decree No 38/2011 abolished the Ministry of National Economy and stated that a committee shall be formed by the Council of Ministers to manage the distribution of its prerogatives, allocations, assets and employees. The ministry had been targeted by protesters for being corrupt and inefficient. On 13 March, a royal decree was announced granting "legislative and regulatory powers" to the parliament, which had previously only been a consultative body. The next day he fired Lieutenant General Malek Bin Sulaiman Al Ma'amari as Inspector General of the Police and Customs. On 15 March, he also issued further royal decrees to add a "cost of living allowance" to all military and security apparatus as well as all government units in Oman. The Sultan also gave orders for raising the Social Insurance Pension by 100% for all the 51,442 persons registered at the Social Development Ministry. The ruling council issued a statement that condemned the "sabotage" and added that peaceful demonstrations were within "the legal rights of citizens".

Other responses included creating of a second public university, establishing the first Islamic bank in the region and approving Marriage Fund utility.

The popular response to the actions of Qaboos was said to be positive, particularly in light of the decision to grant the Council of Oman more powers. Hussain Al Abry, who was a lone protester against Oman Television for four days, said that "Sixty to 80 percent of demands have already been met so there is no reason to continue protesting."

==== Apolitical ====
The Muscat Securities Market's main index fell 4.9 percent. Neighbouring United Arab Emirates' two main stock markets in Dubai and Abu Dhabi also fell as the instability moved to the countries of the Gulf Cooperation Council.

The Sohar Industrial Port Company said that the local port's functions were never disrupted by more than a few hours during periods of traffic problems caused by the protests.

=== International ===
Supranational bodies

(Cooperation Council for the Arab States of the Gulf) Gulf Cooperation Council members agreed to provide Oman with an aid plan similar to the Marshall Plan, consisting of $10 billion aimed at upgrading housing and infrastructure over a period of 10 years. They also agreed that they would give more preference to GCC-member state nationals while hiring individuals.

States

India – The embassy issued a notice to all their citizens residing in Oman (estimated at more than 300,000 at the time) to register themselves with the embassy. It also requested them to avoid taking part in any pro-government or anti-government rallies and steer clear of any kind of trouble.

Netherlands – Queen Beatrix had originally postponed a state visit to Oman amidst the crisis. The visit later went ahead but was downgraded to a private visit amidst several Dutch political parties expressing concern she could be seen as supportive of the unelected sultan. The Dutch parliament debated the matter on 8th of March.

United Kingdom – The British embassy in Oman issued a notice to all British citizens in the country to avoid visiting Sohar as the situation in the city was tense.

United States – The U.S. State Department spokesman P.J. Crowley told reporters the U.S. encouraged the government of Oman to show restraint and resolve differences through dialogue. "We have been in touch with the government and encouraged restraint and to resolve differences through dialogue. We are encouraged by the recent steps toward reform taken by the government of Oman, and we strongly encourage the government to implement reforms that increase economic opportunity and move toward greater inclusion and participation in the political process."

NGOs

Amnesty International has requested and urged the Omani government to show restraint while dealing with protesters.

== See also ==
- Corruption Perceptions Index
- Dhofar Rebellion
- Freedom in the World
- List of countries by unemployment rate
- 2018–2019 Omani protests
