= Sohar =

Omani city on the coast of the Gulf of Oman

Suhar Ṣuḥār (صُحَار) Mazūn (مَزُوْن) Wuxun
- City
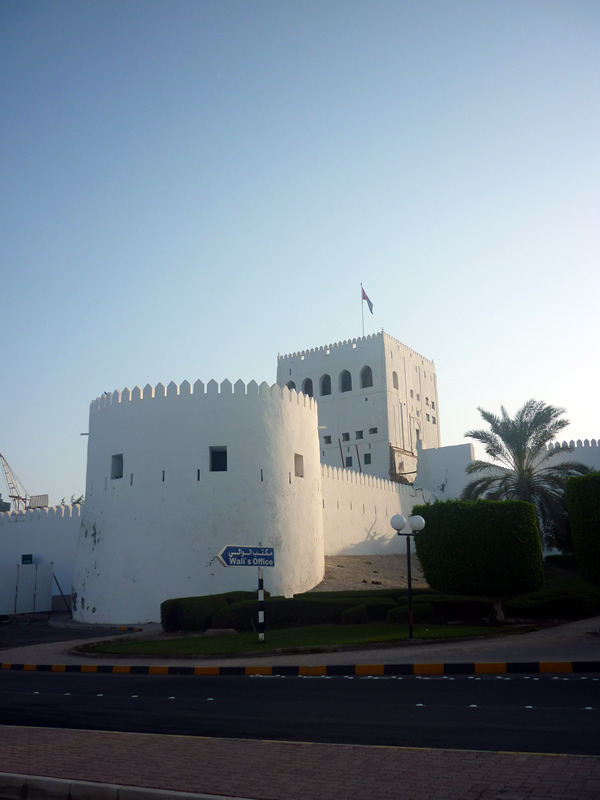
- The fort at Al-Hujrah

- Location in Oman Suhar (Middle East) Suhar (West and Central Asia)
- Coordinates: 24°20′31.2″N 56°43′47.6″E
- Country: Oman
- Governorate: Al Batinah North
- Elevation: 4 m (13 ft)

Population (2016)
  - Total: 221,605
- Time zone: UTC+4 (Oman Standard Time)

Sohar (Arabic: صُحَار, romanized: Ṣuḥār), officially: Suhar, is the capital and largest city of the Al Batinah North Governorate in Oman. An ancient capital of the country that once served as an important Islamic port town on the Gulf of Oman, Sohar has also been credited as the mythical birthplace of Sinbad the Sailor. It was historically known as Mazūn (مَزُوْن).

At the 2010 census, Sohar's population was 140,006, making it Oman's fifth most-populated settlement. Described as an industrial town, the development of the Sohar Industrial Port during the 2000s has transformed it into a major Omani industrial hub.

== History ==
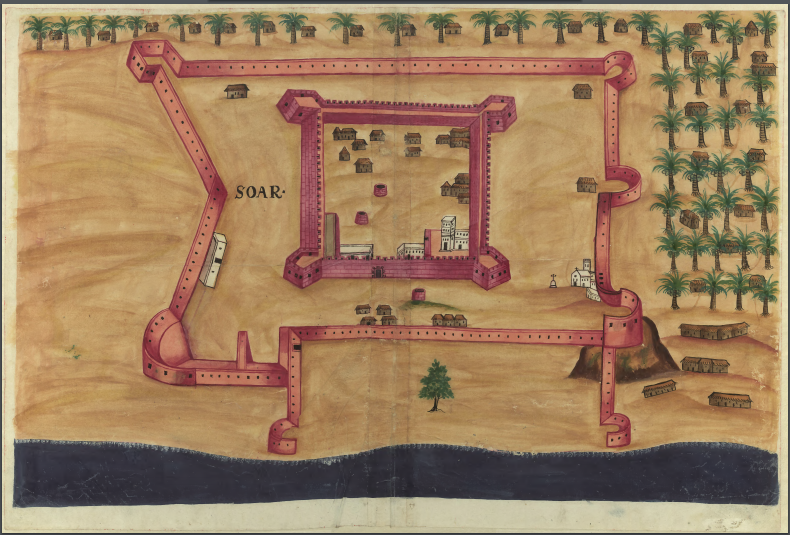
The 16th-century Portuguese fortress, in a drawing of the 17th-century Book of Fortress

As the largest town in the region, it has been argued that Sohar is to be identified with the ancient town called 'Omanah' (Arabic: عُمَانَة) mentioned by Pliny the Elder in his Natural History. This settlement is believed to have given Oman its name.

According to Al-Tabari, in 893 or 894 C.E., during the Abbasid era, there was a dispute about who should rule Oman amongst local factions. A faction that approached the Abbasids was the Bani Sama, who were based in Buraimi, before moving to Sohar. The Bani Sama also referred to themselves as the Wajihid Dynasty, and assumed leadership over the region. The present-day town of Buraimi is part of a historical region that Tabari referred to as 'Tawam', which is now believed to have encapsulated much of the present day United Arab Emirates, and to have been named for St Thomas the Apostle of the East.

By the 10th century, Sohar was one of the richest ports of the Persian Gulf. It was praised by Ibn Hawqal and Al-Maqdisi, who called it "flourishing, populous, beautiful, pleasant and delightful", and compared it favourably with the ports of China. Aloes, wood, bamboo, sandalwood and spices were brought from India and frankincense from Dhofar. The city was sacked by the Buwayhids in 971 and its trade went into decline. It also suffered from attacks by the merchants of Kish across the gulf, who briefly took control of the city around 1100. Sohar then became the initial seat of the Sultanate of Sohar, under the rule of the Bani Nabhan dynasty. They achieved ascendancy after being appointed governors of Sohar by their Buyid suzerains. The city's famous fort was constructed in the late 13th century by the "Princes of Hormuz" while the city remained under Nabhani control. The two entities maintained an agreement over maritime and internal control of Oman. After a period of ruin, Sohar was re-established in the 15th century as a minor port under the Hormuzi-Qalhati sphere of influence. It was still an international port until at least the 16th century.

=== Portuguese occupation ===
In the early 16th century, Sohar was conquered by the Portuguese Empire, which used the city to control the entrances to the Persian Gulf and trade in the region. It was part of a web of fortresses controlled by the Portuguese, from Bahrain to Hormuz, and was depicted in António Bocarro's 17th-century Book of Fortresses.

=== Recent history ===
Starting on 26 February 2011, Sohar was the site of mass protests, part of the Arab Spring uprisings. Although protests also occurred in Muscat and Salalah, the Sohar protests were the biggest in the country, attracting an estimated 2,000 people at times. The protesters' initial demands were for more job opportunities and greater political participation; later demonstrations also called for the release of detained protesters and an inquiry into the use of violence by security forces. The protests centered on Sohar's Globe Roundabout. In response, Sultan Qaboos announced reforms and a jobs program, and reshuffled the Omani cabinet.

== Infrastructure ==
=== Industry ===
A number of enterprises and investment projects in Sohar are centred around the Port of Sohar. Established in 2002, the port has a strategic importance due to its nearness to the Strait of Hormuz. It is operated by the Sohar Industrial Port Company (SIPC). With current investments exceeding $12 billion, it is one of the world's largest port development projects. The port's container terminal, managed by Hutchison Ports handles the majority of the container cargo of North Al Batinah region of the Sultanate.

The industrial development of Sohar was prioritised in the Omani Government's economic development plan in 2020. Investments include more than $5 billion in the steel industry in which Oman aims to be one of the Gulf Cooperation Council's leading producers. In addition to the steel industry, there is also the industry of aluminium in Sohar industrial area. The Sohar Aluminium Company was established in 2004 and it is considered one of the leading projects that play a major role in the sultanate's economic diversification strategy.

=== Education ===
Sohar has four high educational institutes:

- Sohar University – a private university in association with the University of Queensland
- Sohar College of Applied Sciences – a government owned college
- Oman Medical College – a private university in association with West Virginia University School of Medicine
- International Maritime College Oman

Suhar also has a number of international schools such as:

- Al Batinah International School (owned by Sohar Aluminium & ORPIC) – only IB SCHOOL
- Sohar International School (S.I.S)
- Indian School Sohar
- Pakistan School Sohar
- Bangladesh School Sohar

=== Parks ===
Sohar has four main parks. The first is Sohar Park, located in Al Humbar. The second is the Silver Jubilee Park which is located in Sallan. The third is the Entertainment Park in Sanaiyyah. The fourth is in falaj alqabail. There are many other parks, like Alminyal, Alsanqar, Alsuwaihra, Al Ons, Corniche park and Aluwaynat park. The city also has the Sohar Regional Sports Complex.

=== Landmarks ===
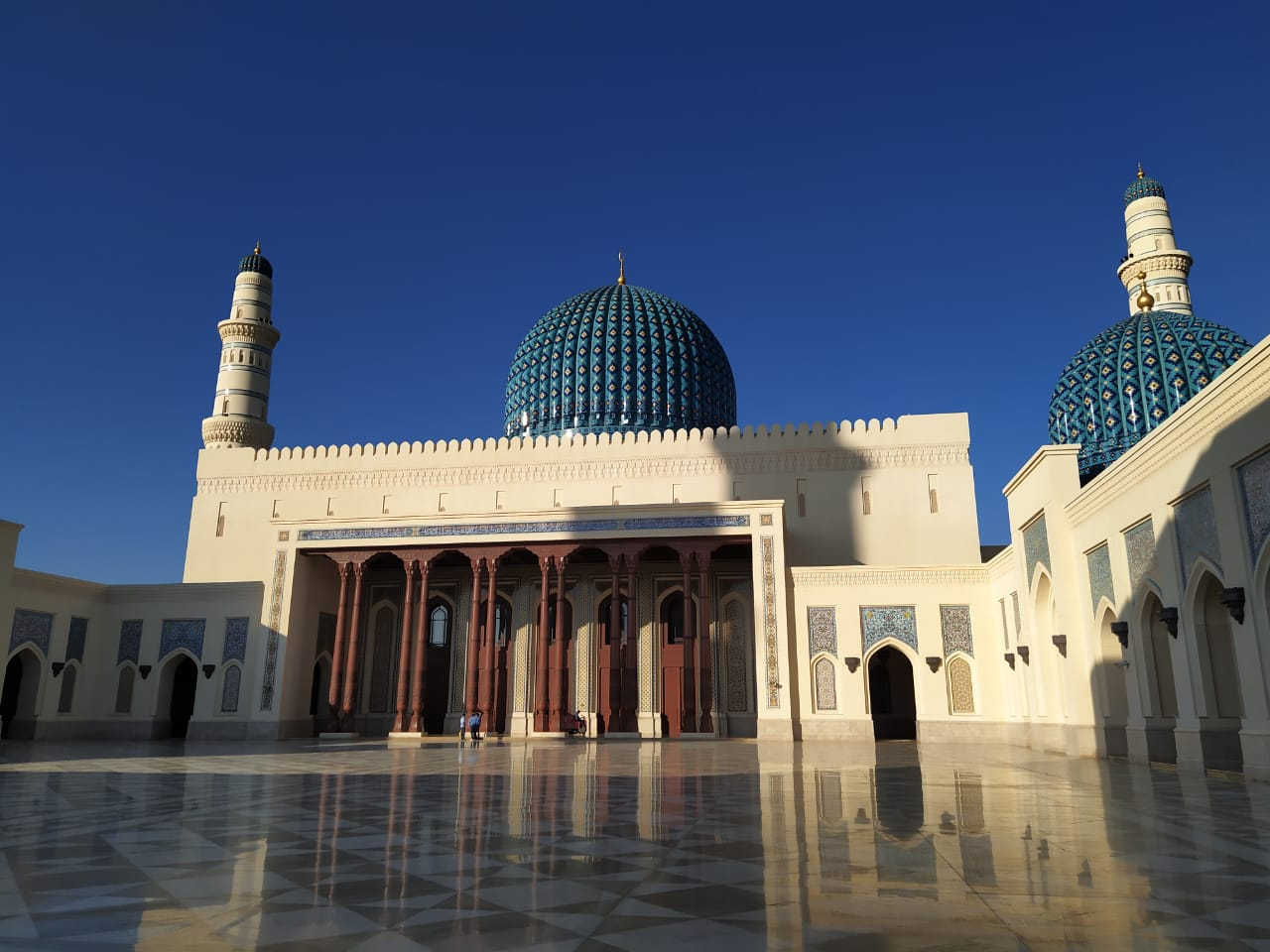
The Grand Mosque

- Globe Roundabout
- Sultan Qaboos Grand Mosque
- Sohar Gate
- Sohar Fort
- Sohar Coastal Market
- Bull Fighting Arena
- Handcrafts Market
- Fish Market
- Sohar Entertainment Center
- Sohar Beach
- Silver Jubilee Park, Sallan

== Climate ==
Sohar has a hot desert climate (Köppen climate classification BWh) with very hot summers and mild winters. Precipitation is low; more than half of the year's total rainfall falls in February, and summers are almost completely dry.

Climate data for Sohar (1991–2020 normals, extremes 1980–2021)
| Month | Jan | Feb | Mar | Apr | May | Jun | Jul | Aug | Sep | Oct | Nov | Dec | Year |
|---|---|---|---|---|---|---|---|---|---|---|---|---|---|
| Record high °C (°F) | 33.1 (91.6) | 34.4 (93.9) | 39.8 (103.6) | 44.5 (112.1) | 50.8 (123.4) | 48.5 (119.3) | 50.0 (122.0) | 46.0 (114.8) | 43.2 (109.8) | 44.4 (111.9) | 37.7 (99.9) | 33.9 (93.0) | 50.8 (123.4) |
| Mean daily maximum °C (°F) | 24.5 (76.1) | 25.5 (77.9) | 27.9 (82.2) | 32.4 (90.3) | 36.5 (97.7) | 36.9 (98.4) | 36.0 (96.8) | 34.8 (94.6) | 34.5 (94.1) | 33.4 (92.1) | 29.6 (85.3) | 26.3 (79.3) | 31.5 (88.7) |
| Daily mean °C (°F) | 19.8 (67.6) | 20.7 (69.3) | 23.0 (73.4) | 27.1 (80.8) | 31.2 (88.2) | 33.0 (91.4) | 33.0 (91.4) | 32.0 (89.6) | 30.8 (87.4) | 28.5 (83.3) | 24.5 (76.1) | 21.3 (70.3) | 27.1 (80.7) |
| Mean daily minimum °C (°F) | 15.0 (59.0) | 16.0 (60.8) | 18.1 (64.6) | 22.0 (71.6) | 26.0 (78.8) | 28.9 (84.0) | 29.8 (85.6) | 28.9 (84.0) | 26.9 (80.4) | 23.6 (74.5) | 19.2 (66.6) | 16.4 (61.5) | 22.6 (72.6) |
| Record low °C (°F) | 5.7 (42.3) | 5.4 (41.7) | 6.8 (44.2) | 11.2 (52.2) | 16.0 (60.8) | 19.7 (67.5) | 20.6 (69.1) | 21.4 (70.5) | 17.4 (63.3) | 11.1 (52.0) | 8.0 (46.4) | 7.4 (45.3) | 5.4 (41.7) |
| Average precipitation mm (inches) | 4.7 (0.19) | 56.2 (2.21) | 17.0 (0.67) | 7.8 (0.31) | 2.5 (0.10) | 0.0 (0.0) | 0.1 (0.00) | 0.0 (0.0) | 0.5 (0.02) | 0.0 (0.0) | 3.8 (0.15) | 15.9 (0.63) | 108.5 (4.28) |
| Average relative humidity (%) | 72 | 74 | 72 | 65 | 63 | 70 | 77 | 80 | 79 | 73 | 72 | 74 | 73 |
| Mean monthly sunshine hours | 269.4 | 228.6 | 230.8 | 276.0 | 322.4 | 310.9 | 281.5 | 275.6 | 276.3 | 284.6 | 257.5 | 259.8 | 3,273.4 |
Source 1: NOAA (precipitation, humidity and sun 1980–1990)
Source 2: Starlings Roost Weather

== See also ==
- Al Batinah Region
- Eastern Arabia
  - Hajar Mountains
- List of cities in Oman
- Sohar Airport, the airport which serves the city
