= Al Batinah North Governorate =

Governorate of Oman

Coordinates: 24.342°N 56.729889°E

Al Batinah North Governorate محافظة شمال الباطنة
- Governorate
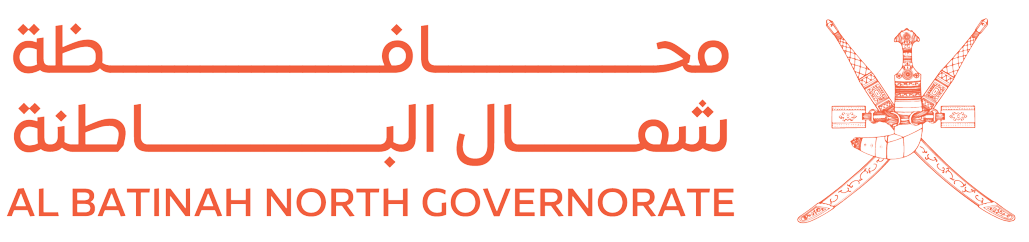
- Seal

- Country: Oman
- Seat: Sohar

Government
  - Governor: Mohammed bin Sulaiman bin Hamoud Al Kindi

Area
  - Total: 9,000 km^{2} (3,500 sq mi)

Population (July 2020)
  - Total: 784,681
- Website: https://bng.gov.om/

Al Batinah North Governorate (Arabic: محافظة شمال الباطنة Muḥāfaẓat Šamāl al-Bāṭinah) is one of the eleven governorates of Oman. It was created on 28 October 2011 when Al Batinah Region was split into Al Batinah North Governorate and Al Batinah South Governorate. The centre of the governorate is the wilayat of Sohar.

== History ==
Al Batinah was originally part of Al Batinah Region, a coastal strip lying along the Gulf of Oman, bordered by the Hajar Mountains to the west. As a significant region in pre‑modern Oman, it served as a strategic trading and maritime zone. The city of Sohar, located in the governorate was the capital of Oman in ancient times.

== Provinces ==
Al Batinah North Governorate consists of six provinces (wilayat):

- Sohar
- Shinas
- Liwa
- Saham
- Al Khaboura
- Suwayq

== Demographics ==
Historical population
Census year	Pop.	±% p.a.
1993	358,478	—
2003	408,963	+1.33%
2010	483,582	+2.42%
2020	784,681	+4.96%
Source: Citypopulation
