= Bilarab Bin Haitham Award for Architectural Design =

Award for architectural design in Oman

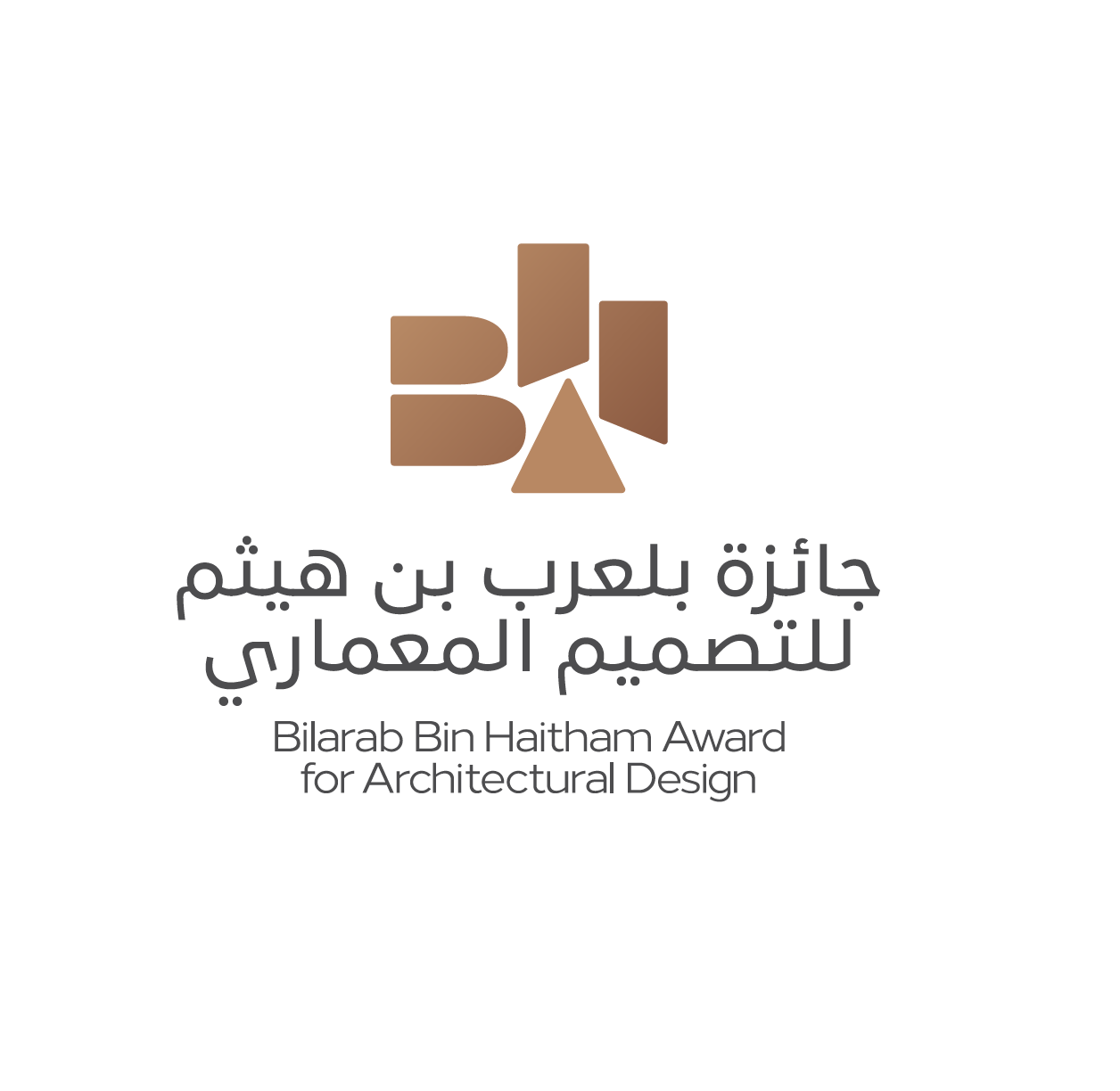
- Location: Muscat
- Country: Sultanate of Oman
- Presented by: His Highness Sayyid Bilarab bin Haitham Al Said
- First award: 2022; 4 years ago
- Website: bha.om

The Bilarab bin Haitham Award for Architectural Design is a local Omani award launched by His Highness Sayyid Bilarab bin Haitham Al Said . The award is coming in line with the future vision of Oman (Oman Vision 2040), in which part of it is developing the Omani governorates architecturally. The award seeks projects and designs that best suit the Omani environment and civilizational identity. It is the only award at the level of the Arab World Awards whose shields are designed with non-fungible token technology (NFT).

== About ==
The award is being launched on Saturday, 15 January 2022. The first cycle of the award lasted for two months. After announcing the award, His Highness Sayyid Bilarab bin Haitham Al Said gave a statement stating the award aims and the participation criteria.

The award seeks to exploit the environmental diversity that the Sultanate of Oman enjoys in its various governorates. The award presents different topics in architectural design in each of its cycles, which target a specific architectural topic each year. At the level of participation, participation in the award can be individual or collective. The collective participation should not be exceeding three people per group post.

The award targets only Omani youth specialized in the fields of architecture, design and urban planning, provided that the age of the participant is not over 35 years old.

== First cycle ==
The target location in the first cycle of the award is the (Mina) port enclave of Wilayat of Muttrah, Governorate of Muscat. The location runs along a 7,500 seafront sector of the town where an edifice symbolizing the 50-year accomplishments of Oman Renaissance under the leadership of the late His Majesty Sultan Qaboos bin Said, and envisaging the aspirations under the leadership of His Majesty Sultan Haitham bin Tarik.

The total number of completed applicants that fulfilled the conditions in the first cycle of the award was 356, submitted by the youth of the Sultanate of Oman who fulfilled the conditions for participation in the award The applicants submitted for the first cycle of the award varied, as participants presented multiple concepts and designs for architectural landmarks, some of which were models and buildings inspired by Omani culture, besides tourist attractions and commercial buildings inspired by some icons of Omani history, in addition to parks and open commercial markets equipped with various facilities and services. Ten projects submitted by nineteen young Omanis were qualified for the next stage of the evaluation. They were divided into five individual teams, and five group teams, which in total included fourteen participants.

=== Winning project ===
The Muttrah Square Project by Abdullah al Bahri, Omaima al Hinai and Ahmed al Jahdhami won first place. The Muttrah Square project has a unique landmark, where an iconic bridge in the middle of the square is designed in the form of a bird over the sea. The project is handed to Muscat Municipality, which will execute project.

== Second cycle ==
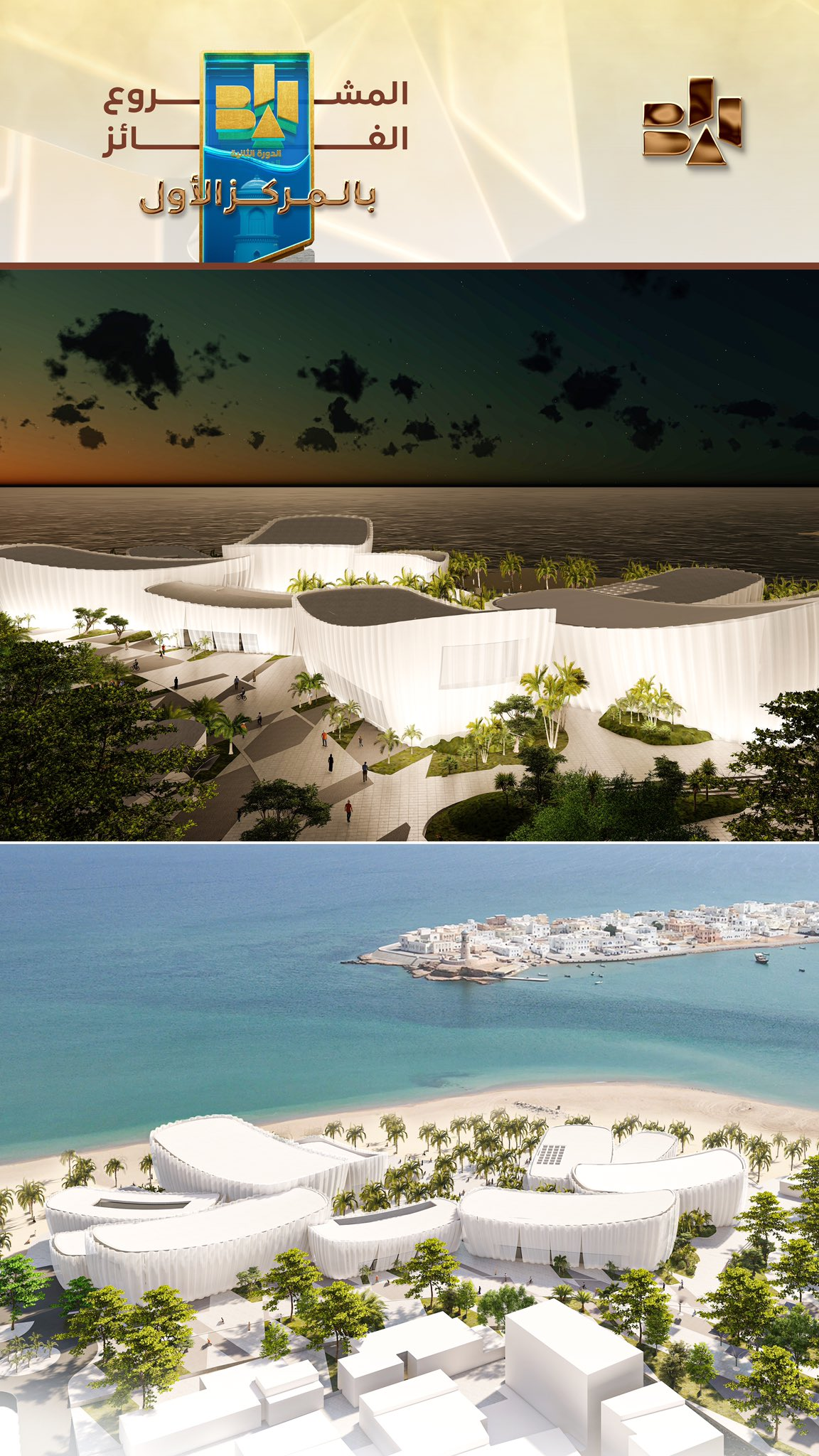

The second cycle of the Award is selecting Williyat of Sur; Museum for Maritime History. The proposed land plot is 14154 square meters, which is selected by the Ministry of Heritage and Tourism that will execute the winning project.

=== Winning project ===
Mohammed Salah Al Balushi won the first place for his design inspired by the scene of the gathering of ships in Khor Al Battah in the Wilayat of Sur during periods of prosperous maritime activity. The building of Sur Maritime Museum was designed to embody the Omani maritime heritage at the peak of its prosperity with the aim of reviving this history.

In addition to the basic components of the museum, the project includes a main walkway "Boulevard" containing cafes, restaurants and a park, as well as another walkway overlooking the sea, linking the sea street walkway to Khor Al Battah Bridge and the Ship Factory.
