= Succession to the Omani throne =

Omani succession

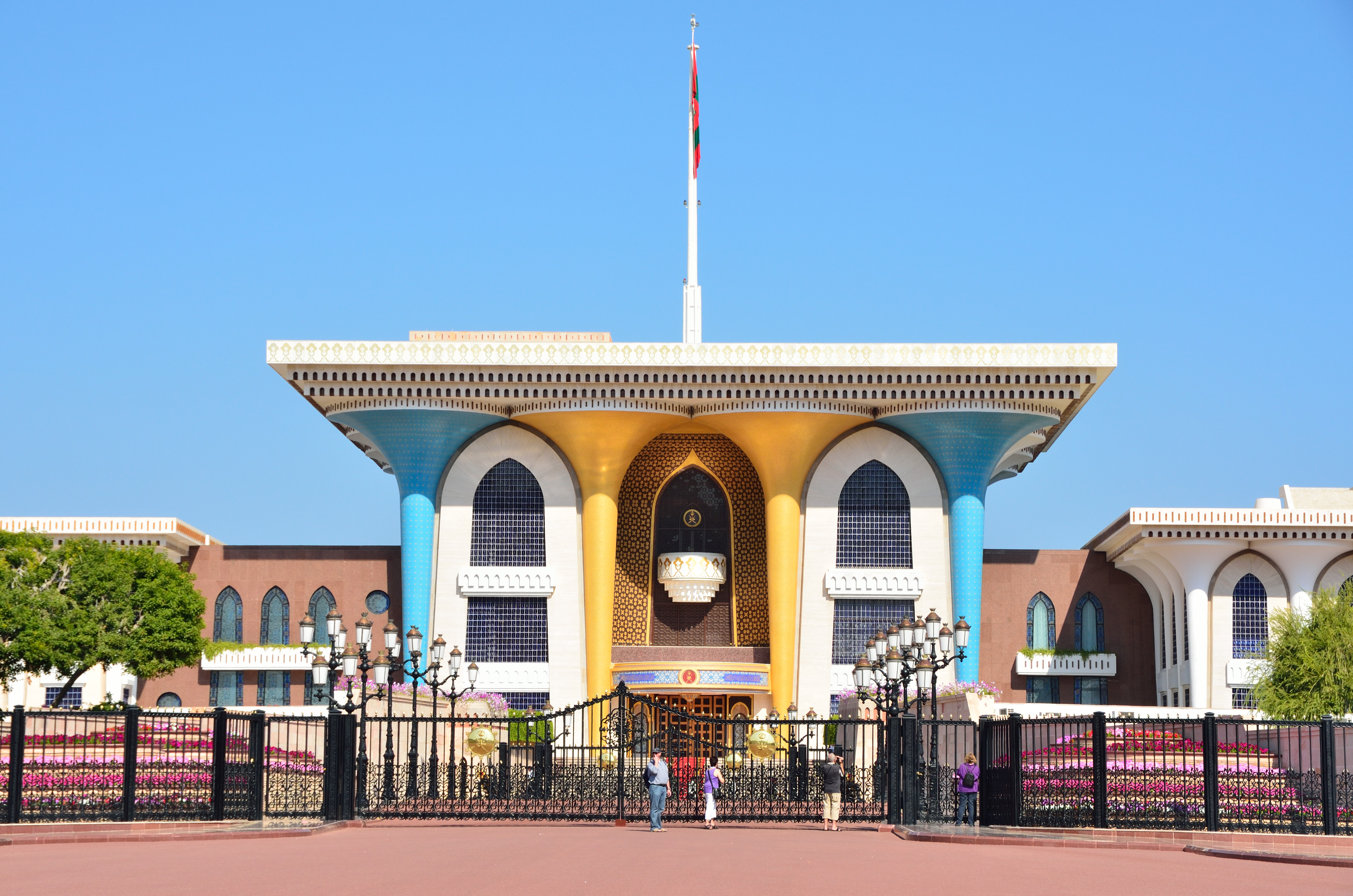
Al Alam Palace

The succession to the Omani throne constitutes the inheritance of the throne of the Sultanate of Oman.

== Succession rules ==
The succession is governed by the Basic Statute of Oman, and is restricted to male descendants of Sultan Turki bin Said, who must be Muslim, "rational" and the legitimate son of Omani Muslim parents. Until January 2021, the succession was by selection among the eligible male descendants of Turki bin Said.

On 11 January 2021, Sultan Haitham bin Tariq amended the Basic Statute to institute a formal line of succession, repealing Royal Decree 96/101 promulgated by his predecessor Sultan Qaboos bin Said in November 1996, and created the title and position of Crown Prince of Oman. Under this amendment, succession to the throne is by male primogeniture amongst the eligible male descendants of Turki bin Said. While the royal decree of Qaboos governing the succession restricted it to eligible family members aged 21 and older, the 2021 amendment eliminated this requirement, and provides for a regency council in the event the new Sultan is not yet of age.

== Line of succession ==
= Deceased or abdicated monarch
= Ruling monarch

- Sultan Turki bin Said of Muscat and Oman (1832–1888)
  - Sultan Faisal bin Turki of Muscat and Oman (1864–1913)
    - Sultan Taimur bin Faisal of Muscat and Oman (1886–1965)
      - Sultan Said bin Taimur of Muscat and Oman (1910–1972)
        - Sultan Qaboos bin Said of Oman (1940–2020)
      - Sayyid Tariq bin Taimur (1921–1980)
        - Sultan Haitham bin Tariq of Oman (born 1955)
          - (1) Sayyid Theyazin bin Haitham, Crown Prince of Oman (born 1990)
          - (2) Sayyid Bilarab bin Haitham (born 1995)
            - (3) Sayyid Haitham bin Bilarab (born 2023)
        - (4) Sayyid Talal bin Tariq (born 1947)
          - (5) Sayyid Nabigh bin Talal
          - (6) Sayyid Tarik bin Talal
        - (7) Sayyid Asa'ad bin Tariq (born 1954)
          - (8) Sayyid Taimur bin Asa’ad (born 1980)
        - (9) Sayyid Shihab bin Tariq (born 1956)
          - (10) Sayyid Malik bin Shihab
          - (11) Sayyid Nader bin Shihab
        - (12) Sayyid Adham bin Tariq (born 1959)
