= Omani Renaissance =

Omani modernization that began from 1970

The Omani Renaissance (Arabic: النهضة العُمانية, romanized: An-Nahda Al-ʿUmāniyya), also known as the Renaissance of July 23, refers to the era of rapid political, economic, social, and cultural development in the Sultanate of Oman that began in 1970 following the accession of Sultan Qaboos bin Said. The era is characterized by the modernization of the country's infrastructure, expansion of public services, development of governmental institutions, and increased integration into the international community.

== Background ==
=== Reign of Sultan Said bin Taimur (1932 - 1970) ===
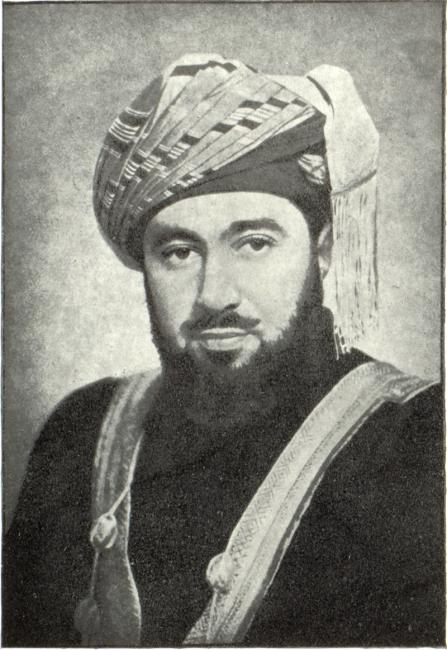
Sultan Said bin Taimur

The policies of Sultan Said bin Taimur (r. 1932–1970) maintained a highly centralized, isolationist, underdeveloped and restrictive system of governance that significantly limited modernization and public development. When he assumed power in 1932, the Sultanate faced severe financial difficulties, limited administrative capacity, internal divisions, and external pressures. The Jebel Akhdar War was one of the most significant conflicts during Said bin Taimur's reign and played a major role in shaping the political landscape of modern Oman, with the discovery of oil in regions claimed by both the Sultanate and the Imamate intensifying disputes over sovereignty and resource control.

The extremely limited development of public infrastructure was the defining characteristic of this period. Most of Oman lacked paved roads, electricity, and communications infrastructure, with the exception of the key coastal cities of Muscat and Salalah. The interior regions were isolated from one another, and traveling between two cities required navigating difficult mountain and desert terrain. This lack of connectivity hindered domestic commerce and slowed the incorporation of rural regions into a cohesive national economy.

By the late 1960s, growing dissatisfaction with underdevelopment, combined with ongoing conflict in Dhofar and broader regional influences, intensified internal pressures for change. The gap between Oman and neighboring states undergoing rapid modernization became increasingly apparent, particularly in areas such as education, healthcare, and infrastructure development.

=== 1970 coup d'état ===
The 1970 coup is widely regarded by historians as the foundational event of the Omani Renaissance. On 23 July 1970, British-led Omani military units arrived at Al Hosn Palace in Salalah and overthrew Said, installing his son, Qaboos bin Said as the new Sultan of Oman.

Immediately after the coup, Qaboos, now the new Sultan, prioritized modernizing the country and defeating the insurgency in Dhofar, which ended nine years later. He redirected the country's oil revenue to economic initiatives, gradually diversifying the economy beyond subsistence agriculture and fishing, and building modern infrastructure. Schools were built, the country was electrified, numerous roads were paved, and slavery was abolished. By 1980, Oman had 28 hospitals, 363 schools, and 12,000 kilometres (7,500 mi) of paved roads.

== Initial phase of the Renaissance (1970 - 1980) ==
The initial phase of the Omani Renaissance (1970–1980) was marked by rapid state formation, military consolidation, and large-scale development programs funded primarily through oil revenues. In 1971, the UAE seceded from Oman and established its own federation with the close assistance of Britain. In its early years, the Qaboos government relied heavily on oil income to ensure political stability, sustain military operations, and finance the emerging structures of the state during the Dhofar Rebellion.

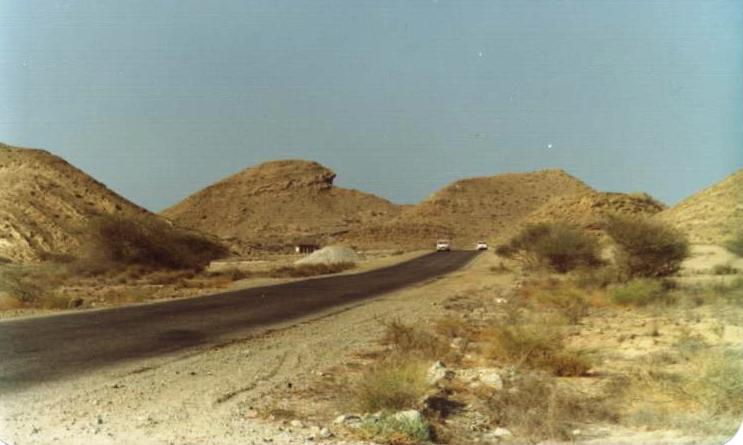
Newly constructed paved roads in Muscat (1973)

In addition to expanding and modernizing the armed forces, the government pursued a combined military and development strategy often described in academic literature as a “hearts and minds approach". This involved addressing local grievances through the provision of healthcare, employment opportunities, and basic services. Large-scale national development programs were introduced during this period, particularly from the mid-1970s onward. These included extensive construction projects in transportation infrastructure, hospitals, healthcare facilities, and educational institutions at all levels. In 1970, Sultan Qaboos started the construction of Seeb Airport, which is today called Muscat International Airport. Opened in 1973, the new Airport hosted 87,000 passengers by the end of the first year. The second-largest airport in the country was established in Salalah, which has become the main artery of the country's rapidly growing business and tourism industry. From 1976, these initiatives were increasingly structured through a series of five-year development plans, reflecting a more formalized and centralized approach to national planning. By the late 1970s, Oman had experienced significant economic expansion driven by the oil boom, and Sultan Qaboos had become widely associated with the founding of modern Oman. This period also saw the emergence of a strong narrative of centralized state leadership, in which Qaboos was portrayed as the principal architect of national transformation.

== Consolidation (1980 - 2000) ==
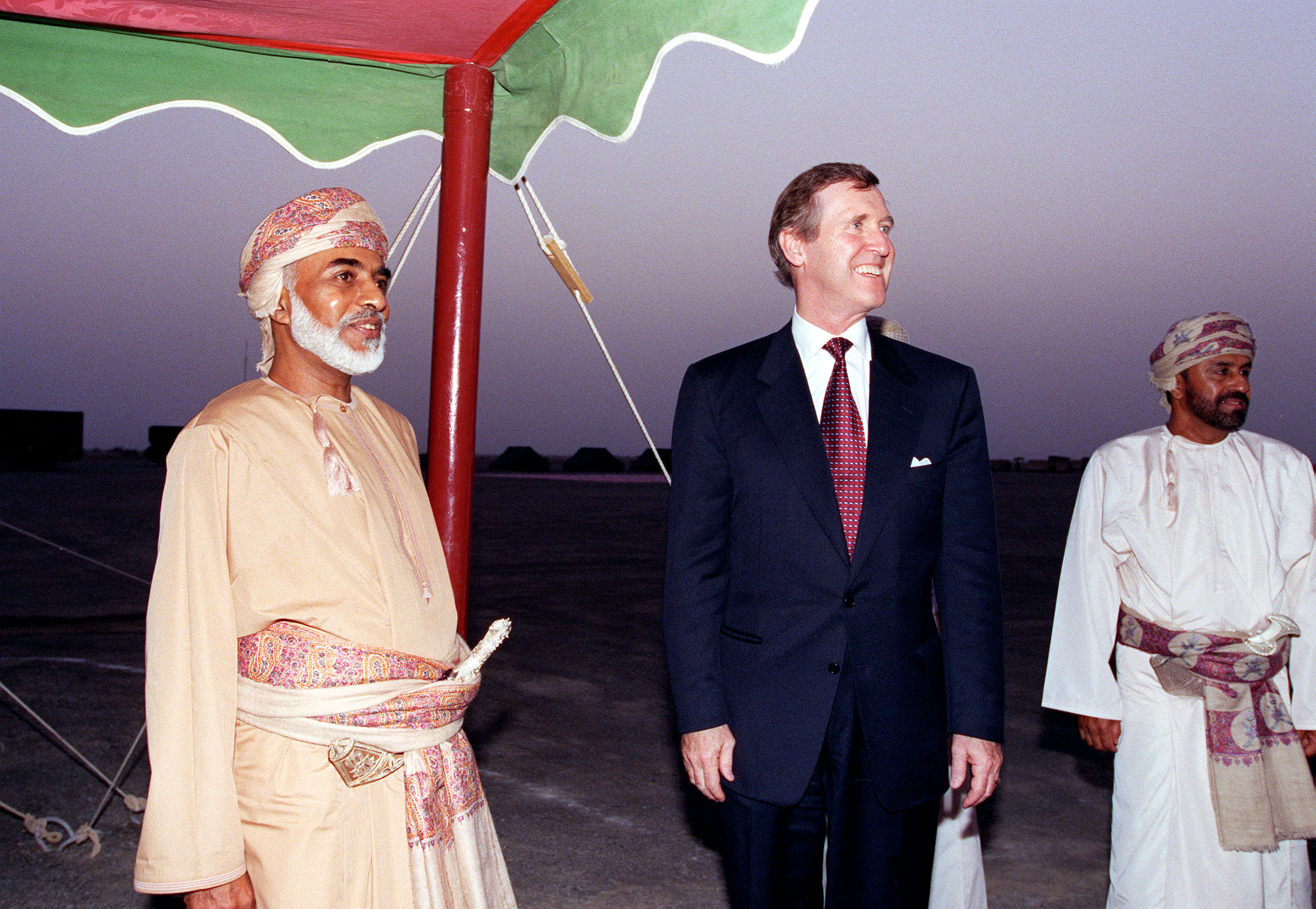
Sultan Qaboos in 1998, with United States Secretary of Defence William Cohen

From the mid-1980s onward, Oman entered a phase of consolidation in which earlier rapid infrastructure expansion was increasingly directed toward strengthening and integrating public services, particularly healthcare and education. This period saw a growing emphasis on building a more structured welfare-oriented state, supported by sustained oil revenues.

In 1987, the Royal Hospital in Muscat was inaugurated, marking a major development in the country’s healthcare system with a focus on specialized curative medicine. Educational development also expanded significantly: at the beginning of the 1970s Oman had fewer than 20 schools, but this number had grown to over 200 by 1975 and continued rising to more than 370 by the mid-1980s. Subsequent development plans prioritized aligning education with labour market needs, extending access to remote regions, and increasing the Omanization of teaching positions. The fourth five-year development plan (1991–1995) further strengthened the sector through the creation of a separate Ministry of Higher Education, alongside the expansion and upgrading of teacher training institutions into university-level establishments.

During the 1990s, Oman also experienced notable political and economic institutional developments alongside its welfare expansion. In 1990, Sultan Qaboos announced the establishment of the Majlis al-Shura (Consultative Council), replacing the earlier State Consultative Council and introducing a limited form of citizen participation in governance through representation from the country’s 59 wilayats. The council also introduced public and televised hearings in which ministers were required to report on government activity, reflecting a gradual institutionalization of consultative practices within the state.

In the economic sphere, the mid-1990s saw the introduction of Vision 2020, the precursor to Oman Vision 2040, a long-term development strategy aimed at strengthening human capital, expanding private sector participation, and ensuring sustained economic stability beyond oil dependency. The plan also set targets for maintaining and increasing per capita income over the following decades, reflecting a shift toward long-term economic planning within the framework of the consolidated Omani state.

Prior to 1970, Oman had a limited institutional state structure, and governance was based on a combination of customary practice and Islamic law (Sharia) in matters involving personal, civil, and criminal offenses. Reforms in the field of law started from the 1990s. The transformation of state institutions into today′s modern state and the establishment of ministries, government, and the legal system took place in the 1990s. Over time, Sultan Qaboos gradually transformed the entire legal system into an institutionalized one and, with the Basic Statute in 1996, the current state of the judicial system in the country emerged.

== Modern era (2000-present) ==
The Omani Renaissance continues into the modern era, with sustained efforts focused on economic diversification, institutional modernization, and long-term national development planning under Vision 2040. With the Electoral Law enacted in 2003, all men and women over the age of 21 were given the right to participate in elections. Oman settled the 2011 Arab Spring protests by providing 50,000 new jobs to the public, with issues today not being political but economic, which has largely been resolved. Nowadays, Oman is placed at the 28th rank on the global level concerning its gross domestic product per capita amounting to 48,500 dollars. Following the death of Sultan Qaboos in January 2020, Sultan Haitham bin Tariq assumed leadership and introduced Oman Vision 2040, a government development program aimed to achieve increased diversification economically, socially, and culturally for the period of 2021–2040.
