= Oman Investment Fund =

Financial company of Oman

The Oman Investment Fund was a sovereign wealth fund established in 2006 by Sultan Qaboos, the then Sultan of Oman. The fund was abolished in 2020 and all of its assets were transferred to the newly created Oman Investment Authority.

== History ==
The Oman Investment Fund was established in 2006 in accordance with a royal decree by Sultan Qaboos and was the successor to the Oman Oil Fund, which was formed in 1993 to invest in the domestic oil industry. The fund received an additional US$1 billion from the Omani government expanding its assets under management.

Under a royal decree by Sultan Haitham in June 2020, most of the country's sovereign wealth funds, including the Oman Investment Fund and State General Reserve Fund, were merged into the newly-established Oman Investment Authority. Before its closure, the Oman Investment Fund had assets of roughly $3.4 billion.

== Strategy and objectives ==
The fund was legally prohibited from publicly disclosing information about its investment strategy or asset allocation. Therefore making it only possible to estimate its funds under management. Its investments were not made publicly available.

The fund had a long-term investment horizon, and its mandate included seeking above-average returns. Its primary objective upon its establishment was to generate economic growth in the country, through direct investment in domestic companies, by assisting foreign companies to extend their investments and operations in Oman, or by facilitating knowledge and technological transfer to domestic entities.

The fund had made investments in real estate and private equity. Other investment sectors in which it has also invested were:

- Travel and leisure
- Media and entertainment
- Industrial goods and services
- Industrial transportation and engineering
- Financial services
- Utilities
- Telecom infrastructure

The fund had a particular interest in emerging industries within Oman, as well as markets with promising growth potential. It had preference for high-growth emerging markets, such as India, where Oman has historical trading ties.

== Governance ==
The fund's sole shareholder is the Government of Oman. It is overseen by Financial Affairs and Energy Resources Council and the Ministry of Finance of Oman.
