= Mazoon bint Ahmad =

Royal consort of Oman

Mazoon bint Ahmad: ميزون بنت أحمد بن علي المعشني

Consort of the Sultan of Muscat and Oman
- Tenure: 1936 – 23 July 1970
- Born: 1925; Dhofar, Oman
- Died: 12 August 1992 (aged 66–67); Muscat, Oman
- Burial: Taqah
- Spouse: Said bin Taimur
- Issue: Qaboos bin Said
- House: Al Mashani (by birth); Al Said (by marriage)

Sayyida Mazoon bint Ahmad bin Ali Al Mashani (Note: The name "Mazoon" is an old Persian name for the Sultanate of Oman. It may also be Romanized as Maizoon, Mayzoon, Mayzūn, Mazun, Mazwun, Mizoon, or Miyzun.) (Arabic: ميزون بنت أحمد بن علي المعشني; 1925 – 12 August 1992) was a member of the Omani royal family. She was the second wife of Sultan Said bin Taimur (r. 1932–1970) and the mother of Sultan Qaboos bin Said (r. 1970–2020).

== Early life ==
Mazoon was born in 1925 in Taqah in the Dhofar region of Oman. Her father was Ahmad bin Ali Al Mashani Al Hakli Al Qahtani, a leader of the Al Mashani tribe. She was Jebbali, meaning she was from a mountain tribe in Dhofar.

== Marriage and children ==
In 1936, Mazoon married Sultan Said bin Taimur. She was a cousin of his first wife, Fatima bint Ali Al Mashani, who he had divorced. Prior to the wedding ceremony, members of the Al Mashani tribe kidnapped Mazoon because they did not think the bride price was high enough. The Tabook, a rival tribe also belonging to the Al Hakli, pursued them into the mountains and brought her back to Salalah where the wedding took place.

On 18 November 1940, Mazoon gave birth to the Sultan's only son and heir, Qaboos bin Said at Al Hosn Palace. Sultan Said was in Muscat and would not meet his son for almost a year. In 1970, Qaboos took the throne in a coup d'état against his father.

== Later life ==
In later life, Mazoon mostly lived at Al Maamoura Palace outside of Salalah. She had a close relationship with her son and he continued to turn to her for advice as Sultan. Mazoon was known to be a generous philanthropist but did not have a public role. She died in 1992 due to complications from her long-term diabetes and was buried in her homeland region in Taqah. In 2006, Sultan Qaboos built the Mazoon bint Ahmad Mosque in her honor.

== Title and style ==
During the reign of her son she was sometimes referred to as Arabic: السيّدة الجليلة Al Sayyida Al Jalila usually translated as The Honourable Lady. The title is now used for Sayyida Ahad bint Abdullah Al Busaidiyah, the consort of Sultan Haitham bin Tariq.

- Her Highness Sayyida Mazoon bint Ahmad bin Ali Al Mashani

== Notes ==
Omani royalty
Preceded by Fatima bint Ali Al Mashani	Royal Consort of Oman; 1936–1970	Vacant Title next held by Nawwal bint Tariq Al Said
