= Saud bin Hilal Al Busaidi =

Omani diplomat

Sayyid Saud bin Hilal bin Hamad Al Busaidi: سعود بن هلال بن حمد البوسعيدي
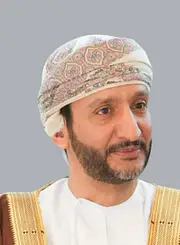

Minister of Culture, Sports and Youth
- Incumbent
- Assumed office 12 January 2026
- Monarch: Haitham bin Tariq
- Prime Minister: Haitham bin Tariq
- Preceded by: Theyazin bin Haitham

Minister of State
- In office 18 August 2020 – 12 January 2026
- Monarch: Haitham bin Tariq
- Prime Minister: Haitham bin Tariq
- Succeeded by: Bilarab bin Haitham

Governor of Muscat
- In office 7 March 2011 – 12 January 2026
- Monarchs: Qaboos bin Said; Haitham bin Tariq
- Prime Minister: Qaboos bin Said; Haitham bin Tariq
- Preceded by: Al-Mutasim bin Hamoud Al Busaidi
- Succeeded by: Bilarab bin Haitham

Personal details
- Born: 9 June 1970 (age 56)
- Parent: Hilal bin Hamad Al Samar Al Busaidi (father)

Sayyid Saud bin Hilal bin Hamad Al Busaidi (Arabic: سعود بن هلال بن حمد البوسعيدي) is a member of the Omani royal family and the incumbent Minister of Culture, Sports and Youth of Oman.

== Personal life ==
Al Busaidi is the son of Hilal bin Hamad Al Samar Al Busaidi who held several prominent political positions under Sultan Qaboos bin Said including Governor of Nizwa, Minister of Justice, and Head of the Supreme Court.

His niece, Alia bint Mohammed Al Busaidi is married to Theyazin bin Haitham, the Crown Prince of Oman.

== Education ==
He graduated from the Florida Institute of Technology in the United States in 2000, the Royal Holloway, University of London in the United Kingdom in 2006, and Victoria University in Australia in 2012.

== Career ==
In April 2010, Al Busaidi was appointed the Governor of Musandam.

On 7 March 2011, Al Busaidi was appointed the Governor of Muscat. In August 2020, he was appointed as the Minister of State and also to the newly formed Council of Ministers. He remained the Governor and Minister until January 2026.

On 12 January 2026, he was appointed as the Minister of Culture, Sports and Youth.

He is also an executive at Vodafone Oman.

== Title and style ==
- His Excellency Sayyid Saud bin Hilal Al Busaidi
