= Adanham =

Village in Dhofr Governorate, Oman

Madenat Alhaq مدينة الحق
- Village
- Location in Oman
- Coordinates: 17°10′40″N 54°22′12″E
- Country: Oman
- Governorate: Dhofar Governorate
- Time zone: UTC+4 (Oman Standard Time)

Madenat Alhaq is a village in Dhofar Governorate, in southwestern Oman. north by road from Taqah.
