= Falaj ash Sham =

Falaj ash Sham فلج الشام
- Village
- Location in Oman
- Coordinates: 23°31′N 58°20′E
- Country: Oman
- Governorate: Muscat Governorate
- Time zone: UTC+4 (Oman Standard Time)

Falaj ash Sham is a small village in Muscat, in northeastern Oman.
