= Taww =

- Village
- Location in Oman
- Coordinates: 23°33′1″N 58°1′20″E
- Country: Oman
- Governorate: Muscat Governorate
- Time zone: UTC+4 (Oman Standard Time)

Taww is a village in Muscat, in northeastern Oman.
