= Yenkit =

- Resort town
- Location in Oman
- Coordinates: 23°30′53″N 58°42′1″E
- Country: Oman
- Governorate: Muscat Governorate
- Time zone: UTC+4 (Oman Standard Time)

Yenkit is a resort town in Muscat Governorate, in northeastern Oman. A $2 billion integrated tourism resort is being built at Yenkit.
