= Kalbuh =

- Village
- Location in Oman
- Coordinates: 23°37′N 58°35′E
- Country: Oman
- Governorate: Muscat Governorate
- Time zone: UTC+4 (Oman Standard Time)

Kalbuh is a village in Muscat, in northeastern Oman.

It is home to a small park, the Kalbuh Park, which faces the Arabian Sea.
