= Al Jifnain Dam =

Wadi Al Jifnain Flood Protection Dam
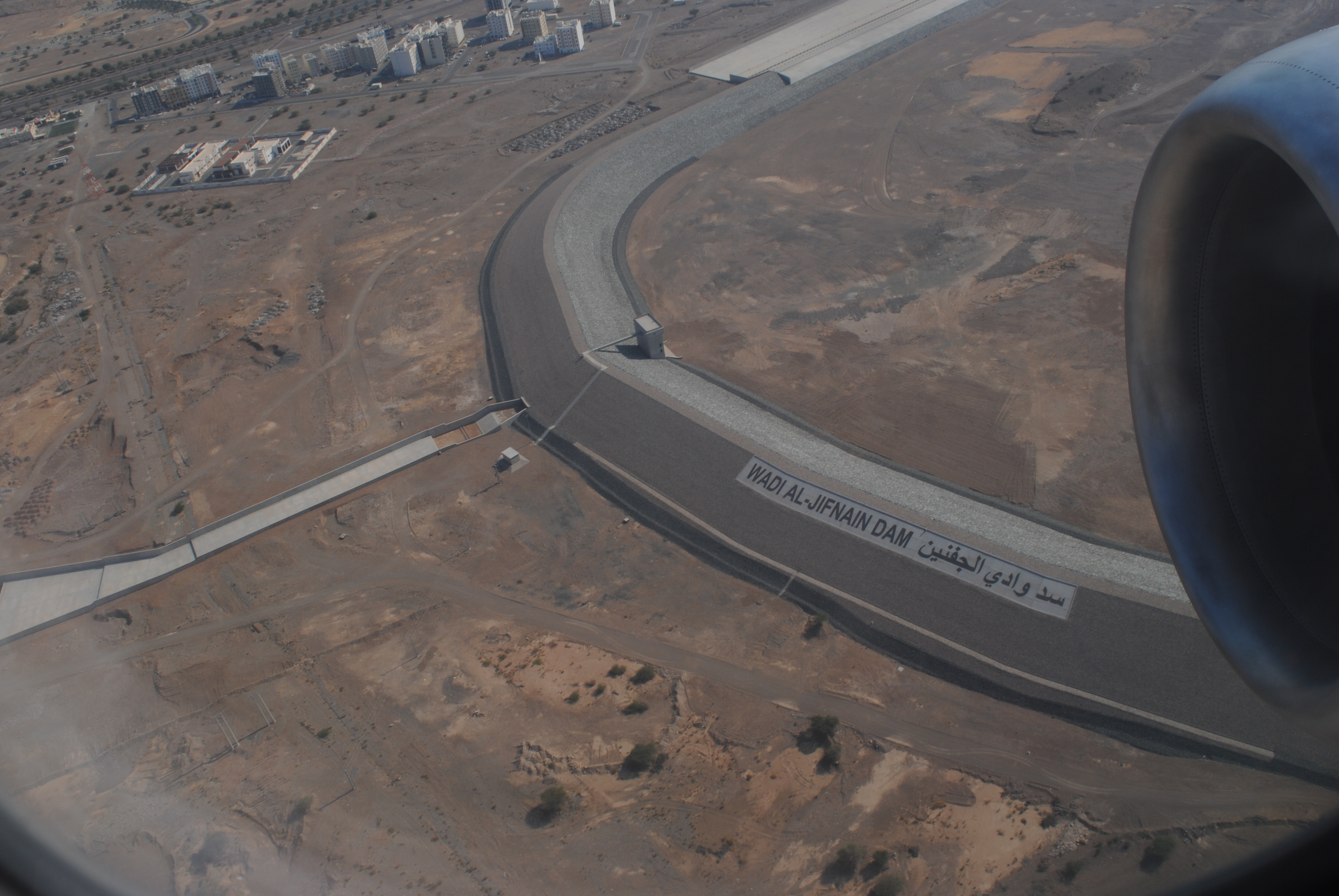
- The northernmost part of the dam, seen from the air in October 2024
- Interactive map of Wadi Al Jifnain Flood Protection Dam
- Country: Oman
- Location: Seeb, Al Jifnain, Muscat Governorate
- Purpose: Flood Protection
- Status: Complete
- Construction began: 2021
- Opening date: March 2024
- Construction cost: 109m Euro
- Built by: Strabag
- Designed by: SERING International / SERING Ingegneria
- Owners: Government of Oman / Ministry of Agriculture, Fisheries Wealth and Water Resources

Dam and spillways
- Spillways: 2

Reservoir
- Total capacity: 15.7m cubic meter

The Wadi Al Jifnain Flood Protection Dam is a construction in Seeb, Al Jifnain, Muscat Governorate, Oman, to prevent flooding, built between 2021 and 2024.

The U-shaped dam is a 4.3 km-long embankment with a maximum height above the natural ground level of 22m. It has a capacity of 15.7million cubic meters.

It is built with an earth and rock fill inside a 20m deep concrete wall. The dam has two outlets and two additional overflow channels.

The contract for its construction, issued by Oman's Ministry of Agriculture, Fisheries and Water Resources, was valued at 109 million Euros. Completion was announced in March 2024.

The Ministry of Agriculture, Fisheries and Water Resources inaugurated the Wadi al Jifnain flood protection dam in Seeb on 24/02/2025, marking an important step in Oman’s efforts to improve flood protection and water management.
