= Muʽskar al Murtafiʽah =

- Ministry of Defence(MOD)
- Location in Oman
- Coordinates: 23°34′N 58°15′E
- Country: Oman
- Governorate: Muscat Governorate
- Time zone: UTC+4 (Oman Standard Time)

Muʽskar al Murtafiʽah is the Ministry of Defence where Royal Army of Oman, Royal Navy of Oman and Royal Air Force of Oman Headquarters is located in Muscat, in northeastern Oman.
