= List of Omani royal consorts =

Royal consorts of Oman are women that have been married to the Sultan of Oman. Sultan Qaboos bin Said was unmarried for most of his reign so Oman was without a first lady for over 50 years until the accession of Sultan Haitham bin Tariq in 2020. His wife, Sayyida Ahad bint Abdullah, is the first royal consort to have an official public role.

Sayyida Ahad bint Abdullah has been given the title Arabic: السيّدة الجليلة Al Sayyida Al Jalila which can be translated as The Honourable Lady, The Venerable Lady, or The Great Lady. The title was sometimes applied to Sultan Qaboos' mother, Sayyida Mazoon bint Ahmad, though she had no official role. English language publications often refer to her as the First Lady of Oman while Oman's government entities use The Honourable Lady when communicating in English.

== Consort of the Sultan of Muscat and Oman ==
Picture	Name	Father	Birth	Marriage	Became Consort	Ceased to be Consort	Death	Spouse
	Aliyah bint Thuwaini Al Bu Said	Thuwaini bin Said Al Bu Said				4 October 1913 husband's death	1946	Faisal bin Turki
	Fatima bint Ali Al Bu Said	Ali bin Salim Al Bu Said	4 May 1891	1902	5 October 1913 husband's accession	10 February 1932 husband's abdication	April 1967	Taimur bin Faisal
	a Yemeni woman			c. 1919		10 February 1932 husband's abdication		Taimur bin Faisal
	Kamile İlgiray			1920	1920 marriage	1921 divorce		Taimur bin Faisal
	a Dhofari woman			c. 1924		10 February 1932 husband's abdication		Taimur bin Faisal
	Kiyoko Oyama	Kanji Oyama	1916	5 May 1936	-	-	November 1939	Taimur bin Faisal
	Nafisa Bundukji	Sadik Hasan Bundukji		1939 (divorced 1940)	-	-	1965	Taimur bin Faisal
	Fatima bint Ali Al Mashani	Ali Fankhar bin Huwayrar Al Mashani		1933	1933 marriage	? divorce		Said bin Taimur
	Mazoon bint Ahmad Al Mashani	Ahmad bin Ali Al Mashani	1925	1936	1936 marriage	23 July 1970 husband's deposition	12 August 1992	Said bin Taimur

== Consort of the Sultan of Oman ==
Picture	Name	Father	Birth	Marriage	Became Consort	Ceased to be Consort	Death	Spouse
	Nawwal bint Tariq Al Said	Tariq bin Taimur Al Said	20 November 1951	22 March 1976	22 March 1976 marriage	1979 divorce		Qaboos bin Said
	Ahad bint Abdullah Al Busaidiyah	Abdullah bin Hamad Al Busaidi	4 April 1970	1989	11 January 2020 husband's accession	Incumbent		Haitham bin Tariq
