= Ghursheba =

- Village
- Location in Oman
- Coordinates: 23°41′N 58°06′E
- Country: Oman
- Governorate: Muscat Governorate
- Time zone: UTC+4 (Oman Standard Time)

Ghursheba is a village in Muscat, in northeastern Oman.
