= Culture and Heritage =

Culture and Heritage may refer to:

- Culture and Heritage Directorate of the Scottish Government, see Strategy and External Affairs Directorates
- Ministry for Culture and Heritage, a government agency within the New Zealand government

== See also ==
- Ministry of Heritage and Culture, Oman
- Culture
- Cultural heritage
