= Khasur =

- Hamlet
- Location in Oman
- Coordinates: 17°06′N 54°23′E
- Country: Oman
- Governorate: Dhofar Governorate

Population
  - Total: 170
- Time zone: UTC+4 (Oman Standard Time)

Khasur is a hamlet on the northeastern outskirts of Taqah in Dhofar Governorate, in southwestern Oman.
