= Salem bin Mohammed Al Mahrouqi =

Omani politician

His Excellency Salem bin Mohammed Al Mahrouqi
- سالم بن محمد المحروقي
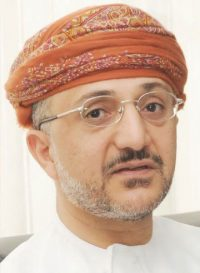

Ministry of Heritage and Tourism
- Incumbent
- Assumed office 18 August 2020
- Monarch: Haitham bin Tariq
- Prime Minister: Haitham bin Tariq
- Preceded by: Haitham bin Tariq

Personal details
- Education: University of Washington (M)

Salem bin Mohammed Al Mahrouqi (Arabic: سالم بن محمد المحروقي, romanized: Sālim ibn Muḥammad al-Maḥrūqī) is the Omani Minister of Heritage and Tourism. He was appointed as Minister on 18 August 2020.

== Education ==
Al Mahrouqi holds a master's degree in international affairs from the American University in Washington.

== Career ==
Al Mahrouqi served as the undersecretary of the Ministry of Heritage and Culture for heritage affairs from 2010 until 2020.

Al Mahrouqi is chairman of the board of trustees of the National Museum.

Since 18 August 2020, Al Mahrouqi has been minister of heritage and tourism.

== Honours ==
- 2016 – Order of the Star of Italy
