= Meyyan bint Shihab =

Omani royal

Meyyan bint Shihab: ميان بنت شهاب آل سعيد
- Born: 1993 (age 32–33); Muscat, Oman
- Spouse: Theyazin bin Haitham (m. 2021; div. 2022)
- House: Al Bu Sa’id
- Father: Shihab bin Tariq
- Mother: Rawdah bint Abdullah
- Religion: Ibadi Islam

Sayyida Meyyan bint Shihab Al Said (Arabic: ميان بنت شهاب آل سعيد) is an Omani artist and member of the royal family. She was previously married to Sayyid Theyazin bin Haitham Al Said, the crown prince of Oman.

== Early life ==
Meyyan is the daughter of Sayyid Shihab bin Tariq bin Taimur Al Said, the Deputy Prime Minister for Defense Affairs and brother of Sultan Haitham bin Tariq, and Sayyida Rawdah bint Abdullah bin Hamad Al Busaidiyah, sister of Sayyida Ahad bint Abdullah Al Busaidiyah.

She earned a bachelor's degree in interior design from Virginia Commonwealth University School of the Arts in Qatar and a master's degree in design strategy and innovation from Brunel University London.

== Marriage ==
In January 2021, Meyyan became engaged to Sayyid Theyazin bin Haitham Al Said, the Crown Prince of Oman. The couple are double first cousins since their fathers are brothers and their mothers are sisters. They were married on 11 November 2021 in the Mazay Hall of Al Alam Palace. Emirati singer, Ahlam, and Lebanese singer, Myriam Fares performed during the celebrations. The marriage ended in early 2022.

== Career ==
Meyyan is an artist specializing in photography and digital art. Her first solo exhibition, Fragments of Imagination, was in 2021. Afterwards, she sold the photographs and donated the proceeds to the Al Rahma Association for Motherhood and Childhood. Her next exhibition was titled Reflections and was held at the Khaleeji Art Museum in London. She is a member of the Photographic Society of Oman and won the Best Photo Award at their 2016 exhibition. She also won Apex Media's Women of the Year award in the arts category in 2021.

Her engagements and patronages are usually focused on the arts including opening Makan Studios, commemorating the Oman Across Ages Museum, and inaugurating the IDF Oman Exhibition. She is the president of the Oman Design Association which works to emphasize Omani heritage and culture in contemporary design applications and help the design industry in Oman by establishing a network of educational, governmental, and commercial entities.

== Title and style ==
- Her Highness Sayyida Meyyan bin Shihab bin Tariq Al Said
