= Madinat al Haqq =

- Village
- Location in Oman
- Coordinates: 17°10′39″N 54°23′14″E
- Country: Oman
- Governorate: Dhofar Governorate
- Time zone: UTC+4 (Oman Standard Time)

Madinat al Haqq is a village in Taqah, Dhofar Governorate, in southwestern Oman. As of the 2020 Omani census, it had a population of 1,527.
