= Oman Investment Authority =

Sovereign wealth fund of Oman

Sultanate of Oman Oman Investment Authority (OIA)
- جهاز الاستثمار العماني

Agency overview
- Formed: 2020
- Headquarters: Muscat
- Agency executives: Sultan bin Salem al-Habsi, Chairman; Abdul Salam Al-Murshidi, President
- Parent agency: Government of Oman
- Website: http://www.oia.gov.om/en

Oman Investment Authority (OIA; Arabic: جهاز الاستثمار العماني) is the investment arm of the Sultanate of Oman, established by Royal Decree No. 61/2020. It is a sovereign wealth fund operating as an autonomous legal entity with complete financial and administrative independence, reporting directly to the Council of Ministers.

The OIA's board is chaired by Sultan bin Salem al-Habsi, the Minister of Finance.

The OIA has introduced the Future Fund Oman with the aim of attracting foreign investment and enhancing investments in local small and medium-sized enterprises (SMEs) with a 2 billion Omani Rials (OMR) budget utilized over a span of five years.

== See also ==
- Oman Investment Fund
- Capital Market Authority (Oman)
- Ministry of Finance (Oman)
