= Manumah =

- Village
- Location in Oman
- Coordinates: 23°42′N 58°04′E
- Country: Oman
- Governorate: Muscat Governorate
- Time zone: UTC+4 (Oman Standard Time)

Manumah is a village in Muscat, in northeastern Oman.
