= Ad Duwaykah =

- Village
- Location in Oman
- Coordinates: 23°42′N 58°02′E
- Country: Oman
- Governorate: Muscat Governorate
- Time zone: UTC+4 (Oman Standard Time)

Ad Duwaykah (Arabic: الدويكة) is a village in Muscat, in northeastern Oman.
