= Nawwal bint Tariq =

Omani royal

Nawwal bint Tariq: نوال بنت طارق آل سعيد

Consort of the Sultan of Oman
- Tenure: 22 March 1976 – 1979
- Born: 20 November 1951 (age 74); Muscat, Oman
- Spouse: Qaboos bin Said (m. 1976–1979)
Names
- Kamila bint Tariq Al Said
- House: Al Bu Sa'id
- Father: Tariq bin Taimur
- Mother: Shawana bint Nasir
- Religion: Ibadi Islam

Sayyida Nawwal bint Tariq Al Said (Arabic: نوال بنت طارق آل سعيد; born 20 November 1951) is a member of the Omani royal family. She is the ex-wife of Sultan Qaboos bin Said and the sister of Sultan Haitham bin Tariq.

== Early life ==
Sayyida Nawwal was born on 20 November 1951 to Sayyid Tariq bin Taimur Al Said, the prime minister of Oman, and his second wife, Sayyida Shawana bint Nasir Al Busaidiyah. She has eight siblings including Sultan Haitham bin Tariq, Sayyid Asa'ad bin Tariq, and Sayyid Shihab bin Tariq.

She completed her education in Geneva before returning to Oman.

== Marriages ==
On 22 March 1976, Sayyida Nawwal married her first cousin, Sultan Qaboos bin Said. She took the name Kamila at the time of her marriage which was also the name of her paternal grandmother. The marriage ended in divorce in 1979 with no issue. She remarried in 2005 while Sultan Qaboos remained unmarried.

== Title and style ==
- 20 November 1951 – present: Her Highness Sayyida Nawwal bint Tariq Al Said

Omani royalty
Vacant Title last held by Mazoon bint Ahmad Al Mashani	Royal Consort of Oman; 1976-1979	Vacant Title next held by Ahad bint Abdullah Al Busaidiyah
