= Faisal bin Ali Al Said =

Omani royal and politician

Faisal bin Ali

Minister of Heritage and Culture
- In office 1976–2002
- Monarch: Qaboos bin Said
- Prime Minister: Qaboos bin Said
- Succeeded by: Haitham bin Tariq
- Born: 1927; Muscat, Oman
- Died: January 29, 2003; Muscat, Oman
Names
- Faisal bin Ali bin Faisal bin Turki bin Said Al Said
- Arabic: فيصل بن علي بن فيصل آل سعيد
- House: Al Said
- Father: Ali bin Faisal
- Religion: Ibadi Islam

Sayyid Faisal bin Ali bin Faisal Al Said (Arabic: فيصل بن علي بن فيصل آل سعيد, romanized: Fayṣal ibn ʻAlī ibn Fayṣal Āl Saʻīd) was an Omani royal and politician. He served as the Minister of Heritage and Culture from 1976 to 2002.

== Early life ==
Faisal was born in 1927 to Sayyid Ali bin Faisal making him a grandson of Sultan Faisal bin Turki of Muscat and Oman. He graduated from the Al Saidiya School in 1942.

== Career ==
He worked as a secretary at the Ministry of Foreign Affairs for several years under Sultan Said bin Taimur before leaving for Cairo. When Sultan Qaboos bin Said took the throne in 1970, he returned to Oman where he worked in the Ministry of Economy, the Ministry of Education, and as a delegate for the Sultanate of Oman to the United Nations.

In April 1976, Faisal was appointed the Minister of Omani Heritage, later renamed the Ministry of Heritage and Culture. He held the position until 2002 when he was succeeded by Sayyid Haitham bin Tariq Al Said, the future Sultan of Oman. The Ministry building now house the Sayyid Faisal Bin Ali Museum to honor his contributions to preserving Omani heritage.

== Honours ==
- Knight Grand Cross of the Order of Civil Merit (Kingdom of Spain, 13/12/1985).
