= Bilarab bin Haitham =

Omani royal (born 1995)

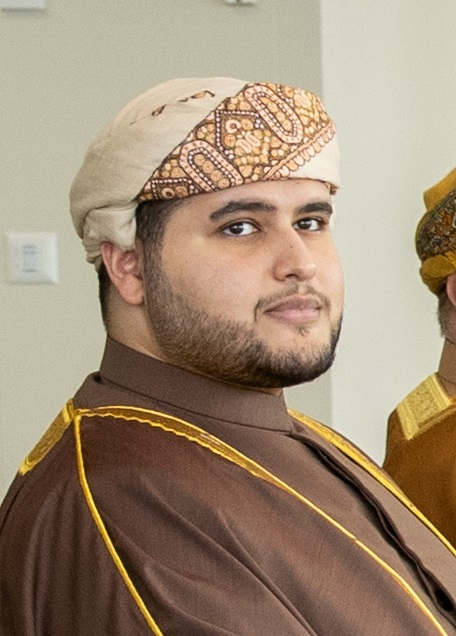
- Bilarab in June 2023

Minister of State
- Incumbent
- Assumed office 14 January 2026
- Prime Minister: Haitham bin Tariq
- Preceded by: Saud bin Hilal Al Busaidi

Governor of Muscat
- Incumbent
- Assumed office 14 January 2026
- Prime Minister: Haitham bin Tariq
- Preceded by: Saud bin Hilal Al Busaidi
- Born: 10 January 1995 (age 31); Muscat, Oman
- Issue: Haitham bin Bilarab Al Said
Names
- Bilarab bin Haitham bin Tariq Al Said
- House: Al Said
- Father: Haitham bin Tariq
- Mother: Ahad bint Abdullah
- Religion: Ibadi Islam

Sayyid Bilarab bin Haitham Al Said (Arabic: بلعرب بن هيثم آل سعيد; born 10 January 1995) is a member of the Omani royal family and second in line for the throne of Oman. He is the incumbent Minister of State and Governor of Muscat.

== Early life ==
Bilarab is the younger son of Sultan Haitham bin Tariq and Sayyida Ahad bint Abdullah. He has one brother, Crown Prince Theyazin bin Haitham, and two sisters, Sayyida Thuraya and Sayyida Omaima.

He graduated from the ABA Oman International School in 2012 and then earned a bachelors degree in spatial design from University of Arts London (UAL) in 2018.

== Marriage and children ==
Bilarab was married at Al Alam Palace on 15 June 2021 and has one son. The name of his wife has not been officially released.

- Haitham bin Bilarab Al Said (born 27 December 2023)

== Career ==
=== Minister of State and Governor of Muscat ===
In January 2026, he was appointed Minister of State and Governor of Muscat by Royal Decree No. 17/2026, issued on 12 January 2026. He took the oath of office before Sultan Haitham on 14 January 2026.

=== Architectural Design Award ===
In January 2022, Bilarab launched the Bilarab Bin Haitham Award for Architectural Design. The first award was won by the Muttrah Square Project which will now be built in Muttrah.

=== Promising Startups Programme ===
Bilarab is the president of the Omani Promising Startups Programme which aims to support innovation and technology based startups in Oman. He visited the Omantel Innovation Labs in September 2024 to view the services offered to technology startups and presided over the launch the Startup Accelerator Initiative in October 2024.

== Honors ==
- Oman:
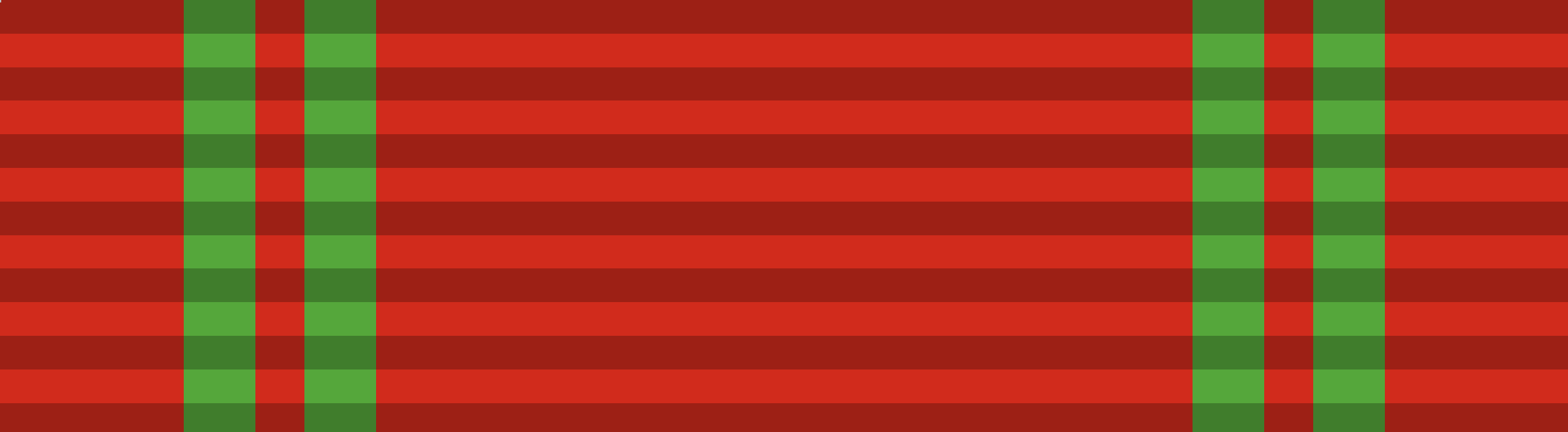
  - First Class of the Civil Order of Oman (18 November 2024).
