= Ahad bint Abdullah =

Consort of Sultan Haitham of Oman since 2020

- Sayyida; The Honourable Lady
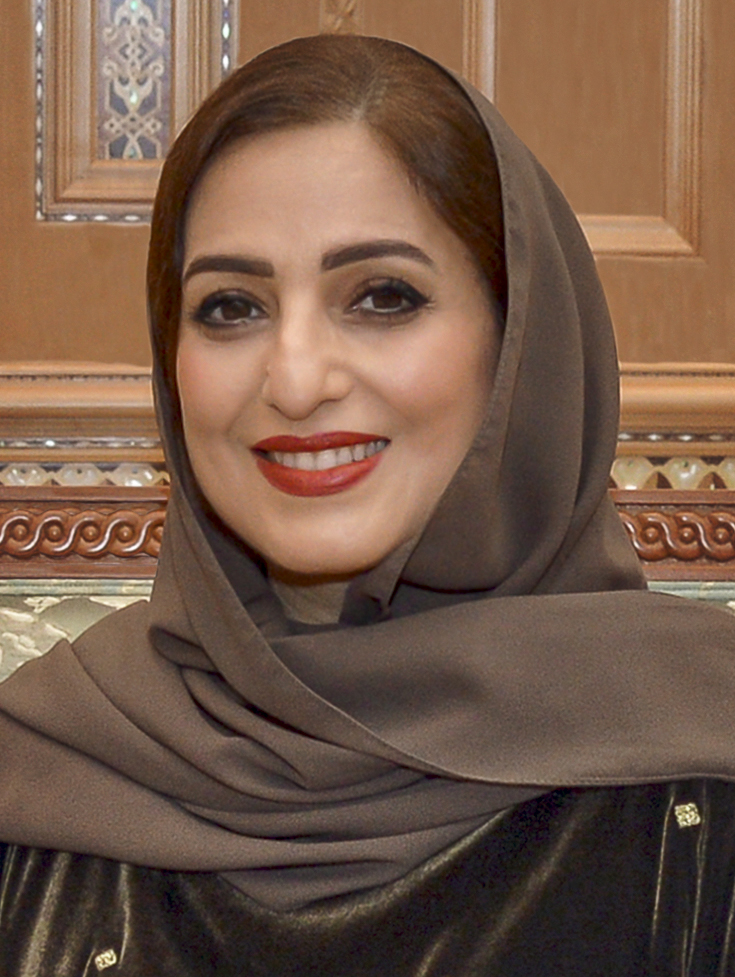
- Ahad in 2020

Consort of the Sultan of Oman
- Tenure: 11 January 2020 – present
- Born: 4 April 1969 (age 57); Muscat, Muscat and Oman
- Spouse: Haitham bin Tariq (m. 1989)
- Issue: Theyazin bin Haitham; Bilarab bin Haitham; Thuraya bint Haitham; Omaima bint Haitham
Names
- Ahad bint Abdullah bin Hamad Al Busaidiyah
- House: Al Bu Sa'id
- Father: Abdullah bin Hamad Al Busaidi
- Mother: Khalisa bint Nasr Al Busaidi
- Religion: Ibadi Islam

Sayyida Ahad bint Abdullah bin Hamad Al Busaidiyah (Arabic: عهد بنت عبدالله بن حمد البوسعيدية; born 4 April 1969) is the wife of the sultan of Oman, Haitham bin Tariq.

== Early life ==
Sayyida Ahad is the daughter of Sayyid Abdullah bin Hamad Al Busaidi and Sayyida Khalisa bint Nasr bin Yarab Al Busaidi. Her father served as the undersecretary for justice in the Ministry of Justice, Awqaf, and Islamic Affairs and later the governor of Musandam. She is descended from Ahmad bin Said, the first ruler of Oman from the Al Said dynasty.

She completed her early education in Oman and then her higher education in sociology outside of the country.

== Marriage and children ==
Sayyida Ahad bint Abdullah and her husband, Sultan Haitham bin Tariq, have four children:

- Crown Prince Sayyid Theyazin bin Haitham (born 21 August 1990), married firstly Sayyida Meyyan bint Shihab Al Said on 11 November 2021 and divorced in early 2022 with no issue; married secondly Sayyida Alia bint Mohammed Al Busaidi on 24 April 2025
- Sayyid Bilarab bin Haitham (born 10 January 1995) married on 15 June 2021 and has issue
- Sayyida Thuraya bint Haitham
- Sayyida Omaima bint Haitham

== Royal consort of Oman ==
Ahad became royal consort upon her husband's accession on 11 January 2020 following the death of Sultan Qaboos bin Said on 10 January 2020. She made her first public appearance on October 17th for National Women's Day. She hosted an event at Al Baraka Palace to honor fifty Omani women for their role in society.

As the consort of the sultan, she hosts foreign dignitaries when they visit Oman such as the royal couples of Belgium and Jordan. She also took part in official visits to the United Kingdom in 2021 and Egypt in 2024.

=== Ahad Foundation ===
In 2021, she started the Ahad Foundation to support women, people with disabilities and people with limited income. The first project was the Ahad al Khair convoy to deliver aid families affected by Cyclone Shaheen. The foundation also supports the Omani Lawyers' Association's Fak Kurbah initiative to secure the release of people imprisoned for debt.

== Titles, styles, and honours ==
=== Title and style ===
Oman does not use a corresponding Sultana title for the consort of the Sultan. Instead, Ahad is referred to as Al Sayyida Al Jalila (السيدة الجليلة), which can be variably translated as "The Great Lady", "The Honourable Lady", or "The Venerable Lady". The Omani government uses the title of "Honourable Lady", preceded by the style of Her Highness.

=== Honours ===
- Oman:
  - Grand Order of Honour (16 November 2025).
- Belgium:
  - Order of Leopold II (6 May 2025).

Ahad bint Abdullah House of Al Bu Said Born: 4 April 1970
Omani royalty
Vacant Title last held by Nawwal bint Tariq	Consort of the Sultan of Oman; 11 January 2020 – present	Incumbent
