= Abdul Hafez Salem Rajab =

Omani politician

Abdul Hafez Salem Rajab is an Omani politician.

Rajab was born in 1937 in Dhofar. He studied mechanical engineering in Kiev University, USSR. After Sultan Qaboos took power in 1970, he had a number or cabinet appointments: minister of economy 1971, minister of social affairs and labour 1972, acting minister of economy 1972, minister of communications and public works 1973 to 1978, minister of agriculture and fisheries 1979 to 1986.
