= Sultan bin Salem al-Habsi =

Omani politician

Sultan bin Salim bin Said Al Habsi
- سلطان بن سالم بن سعيد الحبسي
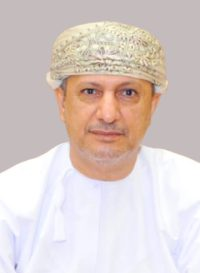
- Al Habsi in 2010

Minister of Finance
- In office 18 August 2020 – Ongoing
- Monarch: Haitham bin Tariq
- Prime Minister: Haitham bin Tariq
- Preceded by: Darwish bin Ismail Al Balushi

Personal details
- Education: Ain Shams University (Dip)

Sultan bin Salim bin Said al-Habsi (Arabic: سلطان بن سالم بن سعيد الحبسي) is an Omani politician who has served as the minister of finance of Oman since 18 August 2020. He is also the chairman of Oman Investment Authority.

== Education ==
He has an accounting degree from Ain Shams University, Cairo.

== Career ==
Before 2017, he was the undersecretary of the ministry of finance and director general of tax survey and administration in the ministry of finance. In September 2017, he was appointed as the deputy chairman of the board of governors of Central Bank of Oman.
