= Theyazin bin Haitham =

Crown Prince of Oman (born 1990)

Theyazin bin Haitham Al Said; ذي يزن بن هيثم آل سعيد
- Sayyid
- Theyazin in 2026

Crown Prince of Oman
- Tenure: 11 January 2021 – present
- Predecessor: Position established
- Monarch: Haitham bin Tariq

Deputy Prime Minister of Oman
- Incumbent
- Assumed office 12 January 2026 Serving with 2 other people
- Monarch: Haitham bin Tariq
- Prime Minister: Haitham bin Tariq

Minister of Culture, Sports and Youth
- In office 18 August 2020 – 12 January 2026
- Monarch: Haitham bin Tariq
- Prime Minister: Haitham bin Tariq
- Preceded by: Position established
- Succeeded by: Saud bin Hilal Al Busaidi
- Born: 21 August 1990 (age 36); Muscat, Oman
- Spouse: Meyyan bint Shihab (m. 2021; div. 2022) Alia bint Mohammed (m. 2025)
Names
- Theyazin bin Haitham bin Tariq bin Taimur bin Faisal bin Turki bin Said Al Said
- House: Al Said
- Father: Haitham bin Tariq
- Mother: Ahad bint Abdullah
- Religion: Ibadi Islam

Sayyid Theyazin bin Haitham Al Said (Arabic: ذي يزن بن هيثم آل سعيد, romanised: Ḏī Yazin bin Hayṯam ʾĀl Saʿīd; born 21 August 1990) is an Omani royal and politician who has been the crown prince of Oman since 2021. He is the deputy prime minister for economic affairs and chairman of the International Financial Centre of Oman. From 2020 to 2026, he served as minister of culture, sports and youth.

== Education and early life ==
Theyazin is the eldest son of Sultan Haitham bin Tariq and Sayyida Ahad bint Abdullah. He has one younger brother and two sisters. His paternal uncle, Sayyid Asa'ad bin Tariq, is the Deputy Prime Minister for Relations and International Cooperation Affairs, and another paternal uncle, Sayyid Shihab bin Tariq, is the Deputy Prime Minister for Defense Affairs. The former Sultan, Qaboos bin Said, was his father's cousin.

He received a bachelor's degree in political science from the University of Oxford and a master's degree in history from Oxford Brookes University. In July 2022, he graduated from the Royal Military Academy Sandhurst.

== Crown Prince of Oman ==
On 11 January 2021, the Sultan issued a new royal decree establishing an order of succession and a crown prince role for the Sultanate. As the eldest son of the Sultan, Theyazin is the heir apparent.

== Professional career ==
Theyazin began his professional career at the Omani Ministry of Foreign Affairs in 2013, serving at the ministry's headquarters in Muscat. In 2014, he was posted to the Omani Embassy in London, where he served as a second secretary for five years. During this period, he gained diplomatic experience in international affairs and contributed to the development of bilateral relations between Oman and the United Kingdom.

=== Minister of Culture, Sports and Youth ===
On 18 August 2020, Royal Decree No. 111/2020 was issued forming the Council of Ministers and appointing Theyazin as Minister of Culture, Sports and Youth.On the same day, Royal Decree No. 87/2020 established the Ministry of Culture, Sports and Youth, defined its competencies, and approved its organisational structure.

=== Deputy Prime Minister for Economic Affairs ===
On 12 January 2026, Royal Decree No. 17/2026 was issued, reconstituting the Council of Ministers and appointing Theyazin as Deputy Prime Minister for Economic Affairs.. On the same day, the Office of the Deputy Prime Minister for Economic Affairs was established pursuant to the same decree. The decree defined the Office's competencies and approved its organisational structure as part of the restructuring of the Council of Ministers in the Sultanate of Oman.. The Office is responsible for overseeing public policies related to economic development and monitoring the implementation of relevant plans and programmes within the approved national frameworks.

=== Chairman of International Financial Centre of Oman (IFCO) ===
On January 2026, royal decree number 8/2026, issued establishing the “International Financial Centre of Oman”. Sultan Haitham Bin Tariq Al-Said issued a royal order on 9 June appointing the board members of the International Financial Centre of Oman, in which Theyazin was appointed as the chairman of the IFCO. The centre consists of three entities: the Authority of the International Financial Centre of Oman, the Regulatory Authority of the International Financial Centre of Oman, and the Centre’s Dispute Resolution Authority..

== Official visits and engagements ==
As Minister of Culture, Sports and Youth, Theyazin participated in a number of official visits and international engagements. In December 2021, he attended the opening ceremony of the FIFA Arab Cup in Qatar. In May 2022, he attended the Royal Windsor Horse Show in the United Kingdom as part of the Platinum Jubilee celebrations of Queen Elizabeth II. He also attended the opening ceremony of the 2022 FIFA World Cup in Qatar in November 2022.

In April 2022, Theyazin inaugurated Oman's pavilion at the Venice Biennale in Italy. In December 2023, he visited Moscow, where he met Russian President Vladimir Putin and discussed bilateral cooperation in the fields of culture, youth and sports. In April 2024, he participated in the World Economic Forum Special Meeting in Riyadh, Saudi Arabia, during which a memorandum of understanding was signed between Oman's Ministry of Culture, Sports and Youth and Saudi Arabia's Ministry of Culture to enhance cultural cooperation between the two countries.

In May 2024, he attended the opening of the 33rd Doha International Book Fair in Qatar and undertook an official visit to Angola.In 2025, he inaugurated Oman's pavilion at Expo 2025 Osaka in Japan and met Emperor Naruhito during the visit.

Following his appointment as Deputy Prime Minister for Economic Affairs in January 2026, Theyazin made an official visit to Kazakhstan in April 2026. During the visit, he held talks with Kazakh officials on economic and investment cooperation and visited the Astana International Financial Centre and the International Centre for Artificial Intelligence in Astana.

== Honors and awards ==
Styles of Crown Prince Theyazin Bin Haitham
- Reference style: His Highness
- Alternative style: Your Highness

=== National honors ===
- Oman:
  - Accesion Medal of Sultan Haitham bin Tariq Al Said (11 January 2020)
  - Glorious 50th National Day Medal (20 November 2020)
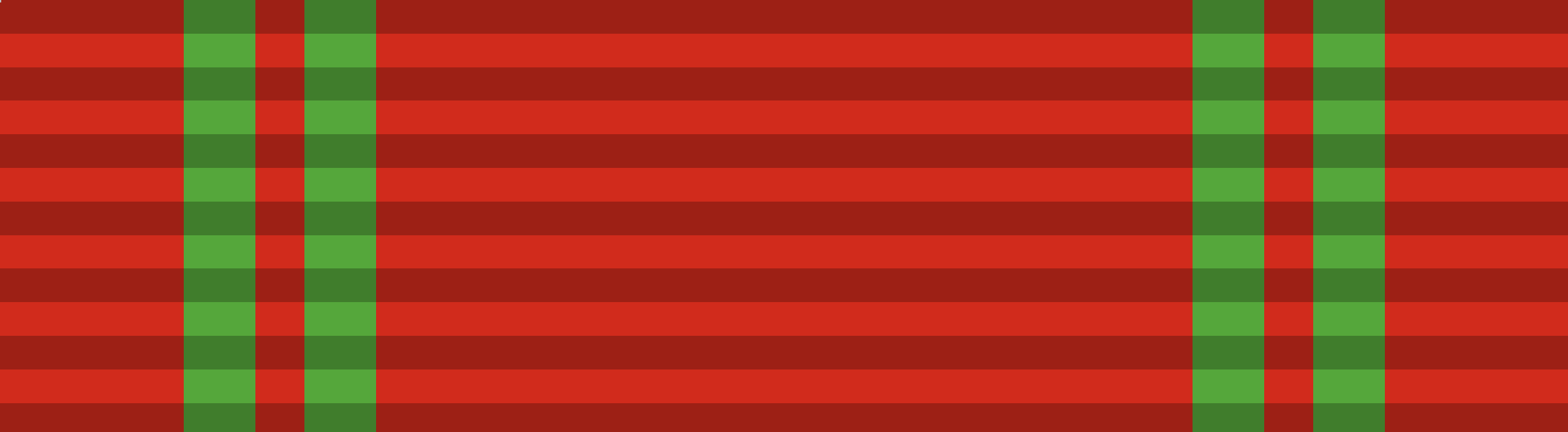
  - First Class of the Civil Order of Oman (18 November 2024)

=== Foreign honors ===
- Bahrain:
  - Member First Class of the Order of Sheikh Isa bin Salman Al Khalifa (7 January 2024).
- Kazakhstan:
  - Member First Class of the Order of Friendship (23 April 2026).
- United Kingdom:
  - Recipient of the Sandhurst Medal (23 July 2022).

== Personal life ==
=== Marriages ===
In January 2021, Theyazin became engaged to Sayyida Meyyan bint Shihab bin Tariq Al Said, a member of the Omani royal family. The couple are first cousins twice over since their fathers are brothers and their mothers are sisters. They were married on 11 November 2021 in the Mazay Hall of Al Alam Palace. The marriage ended in divorce in early 2022.

In January 2025, it was announced that Theyazin was engaged again. In April, it was revealed that Theyazin is set to marry Sayyida Alia bint Mohammed bin Hilal Al Busaidi. They married on 24 April 2025 in the Mazay Hall of Al Alam Palace.

=== Family and ancestry ===
Theyazin is a member of the Al Said dynasty, the ruling family of Oman. He is the eldest son of Sultan Haitham bin Tarik and belongs to a lineage that traces its origins to Imam Ahmad bin Said Al Busaidi, founder of the Al Said state in Oman.

He has three siblings:

1. Bilarab bin Haitham Al Said
2. Thuraya bint Haitham Al Said
3. Omaima bint Haitham Al Said
