= Alia bint Mohammed =

Omani royal

Alia bint Mohammed: علياء بنت محمد البوسعيدية
- Spouse: Theyazin bin Haitham (m. 2025)
- House: Al Bu Sa’id
- Father: Mohammed bin Hilal Al Busaidi
- Religion: Ibadi Islam

Sayyida Alia bint Mohammed bin Hilal Al Busaidi (Arabic: علياء بنت محمد بن هلال البوسعيدية) is a member of the Omani royal family. She is married to Sayyid Theyazin bin Haitham Al Said, the Crown Prince of Oman.

== Early life ==
She is the daughter of Sayyid Mohammed bin Hilal bin Hamad Al Busaidi and belongs to a family of prominent politicians. Her grandfather, Sayyid Hilal bin Hamad Al Samar Al Busaidi, was the Governor of Nizwa, Minister of Justice, and Head of the Supreme Court under Sultan Qaboos bin Said. Her uncle, Sayyid Saud bin Hilal Al Busaidi, is the Governor of Muscat and another uncle, Sayyid Ahmed bin Hilal Al Busaidi, is the Omani ambassador to the United Arab Emirates.

== Marriage ==
In January 2025, Alia became engaged to Sayyid Theyazin bin Haitham Al Said, the Crown Prince of Oman. They were married on 24 April 2025 in the Mirror Hall of Al Alam Palace.

== Title and style ==
- Her Highness Sayyida Alia bint Mohammed Al Busaidi
