= Oman Vision 2040 =

Oman government development program

- 2040 رؤية عُمان
- Official logo

Development program overview
- Formed: 2020
- Jurisdiction: Government Of Oman
- Motto: Moving Forward with Confidence
- Key document: Vision Document English Arabic
- Website: https://www.oman2040.om

Oman Vision 2040 (Arabic: 2040 رؤية عُمان, romanized: Ruʾyat ʿūman alfayn wa arbiūʾn) is a government development program launched by Oman which aims to achieve the goal of increased diversification economically, socially, and culturally for the period of 2021–2040. It was put in place under the late Sultan Qaboos Bin Said, and carried forward by his successor, Sultan Haitham bin Tariq. It was first announced in 2020 by the Omani government.

== Overview ==
Issued in 2017, the program was initially a repackaging of Oman's Vision 2020 launched in 1995. Announced in 2020 by the newly appointed sultan Haitham bin Tariq, the program initially was made to achieve the goal of increased diversification in its economy, digital transformation, and less dependency on oil exports. In 2020, during the project's announcement, the oil and gas sector accounted for 26.2% of GDP, and represented about 60% of Oman's merchandise exports, while contributed three quarters of total government revenues.

== Goals ==
The initiative is carried out in various 5-year plans, with around 4 axes, representing culture, economy, and government affairs among others.

== See also ==
- Egypt Vision 2030
- Saudi Vision 2030
