= Haitham bin Tariq =

Sultan of Oman since 2020

Haitham bin Tariq Al Said; هَيْثَم بْن طَارِق آل سَعِيد
- Haitham in 2026

Sultan of Oman
- Reign: 11 January 2020 – present
- Predecessor: Qaboos bin Said
- Heir apparent: Theyazin bin Haitham

3rd Prime Minister of Oman
- Incumbent
- Assumed office 11 January 2020
- Deputy: Fahd bin Mahmoud (2020–2026); Asa'ad bin Tariq (2017–present); Shihab bin Tariq (2020–present); Theyazin bin Haitham (2026–present)
- Preceded by: Qaboos bin Said
Ministerial offices 1986‍–‍present
Minister of Defence
Incumbent
Assumed office 11 January 2020
| Preceded by | Qaboos bin Said |
Minister of Heritage and Culture
In office March 2002 – 1 March 2020
| Prime Minister | Qaboos bin Said |
| Preceded by | Faisal bin Ali Al Said |
| Succeeded by | Salem bin Mohammed Al Mahrouqi |
Minister of Foreign Affairs
In office 11 January 2020 – 18 August 2020
| Prime Minister | Himself |
| Preceded by | Qaboos bin Said |
| Succeeded by | Badr bin Hamad Al Busaidi |
Minister of Finance
In office 11 January 2020 – 18 August 2020
| Prime Minister | Himself |
| Preceded by | Qaboos bin Said |
| Succeeded by | Sultan bin Salem bin Saeed al-Habsi |
Secretary General of the Ministry of Foreign Affairs
In office 1994–2002
| Prime Minister | Qaboos bin Said |
Undersecretary of the Foreign Ministry for Political Affairs
In office 1986–1994
| Prime Minister | Qaboos bin Said |
- Born: 11 October 1955 (age 71); Muscat, Muscat and Oman
- Spouse: Ahad bint Abdullah bin Hamad Al Busaidi (m. 1989)
- Issue: Theyazin bin Haitham; Bilarab bin Haitham; Thuraya bint Haitham; Omaima bint Haitham
Names
- Haitham bin Tariq bin Taimur bin Faisal bin Turki bin Said Al Said
- House: Al Bu Sa'id
- Father: Tariq bin Taimur Al Said
- Mother: Shawana bint Hamud Al Busaidi
- Religion: Ibadi Islam

Haitham bin Tariq Al Said (Note: Arabic: هَيْثَم بْن طَارِق آل سَعِيد, romanised: Hayṯam bin Ṭāriq ʾĀl Saʿīd) (born 11 October 1955) is Sultan and Prime Minister of Oman. He acceded to the throne in 2020 following the death of his cousin, Sultan Qaboos bin Said, becoming the fifteenth ruler of the Al Bu Said dynasty, which has ruled Oman since the mid-eighteenth century.

Haitham was born in Muscat to Sayyid Tariq bin Taimur Al Said, an uncle of Sultan Qaboos who served as his first Prime Minister from 1970 to 1972. He received his primary education at Al Saidiya School in Muscat before continuing his secondary and university studies in the United Kingdom. In 1979, he graduated from the University of Oxford's Foreign Service Programme and later pursued postgraduate studies at Pembroke College, Oxford. Beginning in 1986, Haitham served varying positions in the Cabinet of Oman under Sultan Qaboos, most notably as Minister of Heritage and Culture.

Since becoming Sultan, Haitham has largely continued his predecessor's domestic and foreign policy, which saw Oman develop into a stable, modern country. In 2021, he reaffirmed citizens' and residents' freedom of expression and opinion in a revamp of Oman's Basic Statute, while making reforms aimed at further modernizing the state, strengthening public finances, diversifying the economy, and improving government efficiency under Oman Vision 2040.

In foreign affairs, Haitham has maintained Oman's longstanding policy of neutrality, dialogue, and non-interference in regional disputes. Oman has continued to act as a mediator in diplomatic efforts involving neighboring states and international powers, preserving its reputation as a country capable of facilitating communication between parties with competing interests. Under his leadership, Omani diplomacy helped facilitate a ceasefire agreement between the United States and the Houthi movement, providing to a halt in attacks on international shipping in the Red Sea and U.S. military operations against Houthi targets, in addition to hosting negotiations between the United States and Iran that preceded the 2026 Iran war.

== Early life ==
Haitham is the son of Sayyid Tariq bin Taimur Al Said, Oman's first prime minister, and the grandson of Sultan Taimur bin Feisal Al Said. His mother is Sayyida Shawana bint Hamud bin Ahmad Al Busaidi. He has six brothers and two sisters: Talal, Qais, Asa'ad, Shihab, Adham, Faris, Amal, and Nawwal. His brother Sayyid Asa'ad bin Tariq is the Deputy Prime Minister for Relations and International Cooperation Affairs and his brother Sayyid Shihab bin Tariq is the Deputy Prime Minister for Defense Affairs. His other four brothers are all businessmen and are not involved in politics. His sister Sayyida Nawwal bint Tariq was married to Sultan Qaboos from 1976 to 1979.

=== Education ===
He completed his primary education at Saidiya School in Muscat and attended Brummana High School in Lebanon from 1969 to 1973. He graduated from the Foreign Service Programme (FSP) at Pembroke College, Oxford in 1979.

== Marriage and children ==
Haitham is married to Sayyida Ahad bint Abdullah bin Hamad Al Busaidi and together they have four children, including

- Crown Prince Sayyid Theyazin bin Haitham (born 21 August 1990), married firstly Sayyida Meyyan bint Shihab Al Said on 11 November 2021 and divorced in early 2022; married secondly Sayyida Alia bint Mohammed Al Busaidi on 24 April 2025
- Sayyid Bilarab bin Haitham (born 10 January 1995) married on 15 June 2021 and has issue
- Sayyida Thuraya bint Haitham
- Sayyida Omaima bint Haitham

== Political career ==
A sports enthusiast, Haitham served as the first head of the Oman Football Association in the early 1980s. He served as the Undersecretary of the Ministry of Foreign Affairs for Political Affairs from 1986 to 1994, and was later appointed as the Secretary General for the Ministry of Foreign Affairs from 1994 to 2002. He was subsequently appointed as Minister of Heritage and Culture in March 2002 and later chaired the national census committee in 2003. He usually represented Oman abroad in a diplomatic capacity; in 2016, he personally welcomed the Prince of Wales and the Duchess of Cornwall (later King Charles III and Queen Camilla) on a visit to Oman.

Haitham is also the chairman of the committee for Oman Vision 2040 along with being honorary president of the Oman Association for the Disabled. He was said to be the favoured candidate of Oman's merchant families with whom he is said to have links.

=== Sultan of Oman ===
Haitham meets President of Russia Vladimir Putin at the Kremlin on 22 April 2025

After the death of Sultan Qaboos, Haitham's first cousin, on 10 January 2020, Haitham was named by the royal family and Qaboos's will as Sultan of Oman the next day and took an oath before an emergency session of the Council of Oman in Al-Bustan. According to Omani state TV, Qaboos's letter was opened by the Defence Council and his identity was announced shortly thereafter. As Sultan, he also held the positions of Prime Minister, Supreme Commander of the Armed Forces, Minister of Defence, Minister of Finance, Minister of Foreign Affairs and Chairman of the Central Bank of Oman until 18 August 2020 when he appointed Badr bin Hamad Al Busaidi as foreign minister, Sultan bin Salem bin Saeed al-Habsi as minister of finance, and Taimur bin Asa'ad Al Said as chairman of the Central Bank of Oman.

In his first public speech, he promised to uphold his predecessor's peace-making foreign policy and to further develop Oman's economy. Haitham is married and, unlike his predecessor, also has children, two sons and two daughters. Early in his reign he signed Oman to the United Nations Convention Against Torture, the International Covenant on Economic, Social and Cultural Rights and International Convention for the Protection of All Persons from Enforced Disappearance. In October 2020, Oman was the first Gulf state to send an ambassador back to Syria after they downgraded or shut missions in Damascus in 2012 over attacks by the government there on protests at the start of the war.

On 11 January 2021, Haitham issued a royal decree creating a Crown Prince role, stating that Oman's crown prince will be the eldest son of the serving sultan. This made his eldest son, Sayyid Theyazin, the country's first crown prince, and officially formalised the method of succession. He also amended the Basic Statute of Oman to reaffirm citizens' and residents' freedom of expression and opinion, removed a law that allowed the state to monitor private phone conversations, social media or postal correspondence, and granted the freedom to practice religious rites according to recognised customs, provided it does not violate the public order or contradict morals. In April 2021, Oman introduced its value added tax (VAT), later than the United Arab Emirates, Saudi Arabia and Bahrain but before Qatar and Kuwait. In May and June 2021, there were multiple protests against the Omani government over economic concerns such as unemployment and corruption. Some protesters were arrested, but later released.

Haitham's visits to Saudi Arabia, Qatar and the United Kingdom have been seen as a move to maintain peaceful and cordial relations with Oman's allies. His visit to Saudi Arabia was the first political visit by an Omani royal to the kingdom in over a decade. During his visit to the United Kingdom, he met Queen Elizabeth II at Windsor Castle and was appointed an Honorary Knight Grand Cross of the Order of St Michael and St George. In September 2022, following Elizabeth II's death, Haitham visited Buckingham Palace to offer his condolences to King Charles III.

He visited Tehran in May 2023 where he discussed regional diplomatic and security issues, two days after Muscat mediated a prisoner swap between Iran and Belgium. The same year, the government approved a $5.2 billion investment fund, the Oman Future Fund, to support diversified economic growth and announced a new development project, Sultan Haitham City. A new Tourism Law was also promulgated in late 2023.

The Medium Term Fiscal Plan for 2020–2024 under Haitham proposed greater fiscal sustainability. Oman's overall fiscal deficit averaged 12.8% of gross domestic product from 2015–2020, while the budget deficit reached approximately 3.6% in 2021. Oman had a budget surplus of approximately 5% of GDP in 2022 – the country's first surplus since 2013. Oman's long-term sovereign credit rating changed from junk status to the investment grade of BB+ in 2024. In 2025 Moody's upgraded Oman's long-term issuer and senior unsecured ratings to "Baa3" from "Ba1", due to expectations of continued improvement in debt ratios and resilience to lower oil prices.

During the Twelve-Day War in June 2025, in a call with President Masoud Pezeshkian of Iran, Haitham emphasised the need for de-escalation from both sides and a return to negotiations to halt the ongoing conflict and its catastrophic repercussions. In May 2025, Oman mediated a ceasefire between the US and Houthi forces. In 2025 Oman become the first country in the Gulf to impose a personal income tax. Oman will impose a 5% tax on taxable income for individuals earning over 42,000 Omani rials ($109,091) per year starting from 2028. The tax will apply to about 1% of the population. Officials said that the tax was intended to promote equity and reduce the country's dependence on oil and gas, which made up around 70% of the state revenues in 2024. Revenue estimates for the new tax stand at less than 0.5% of GDP.

On 9 March 2026, Haitham was the first Arab leader to congratulate Iran's new supreme leader, Mojtaba Khamenei, underscoring Muscat's continued commitment to maintaining positive relations with Tehran. Following the 2026 Iran war and the rise in crude oil prices, the rises meant Oman was projected to run a surplus of as much as $3 billion in 2026 if spending keeps to budget. That in turn would usefully eat into the country’s $38 billion in public debt, nearly 36% of GDP but already well down from the coronavirus pandemic-era high of 68% of GDP. From 1 to 2 November 2026, Haitham visited China, marking the first visit by an Omani head of state to China since diplomatic relations were established in 1978. During the visit, he met with Chinese leader Xi Jinping.

== Titles, styles, and honours ==
Styles of Sultan Haitham bin Tariq Al Said
- Reference style: His Majesty
- Alternative style: Your Majesty

=== Titles and styles ===
- 11 October 1955 – 10 January 2020: His Highness Sayyid Haitham bin Tariq bin Taimur Al Said
- 11 January 2020 – present: His Majesty The Sultan of Oman

=== National honours ===
- Oman:
  - Member 1st Class of the Order of Al-Said
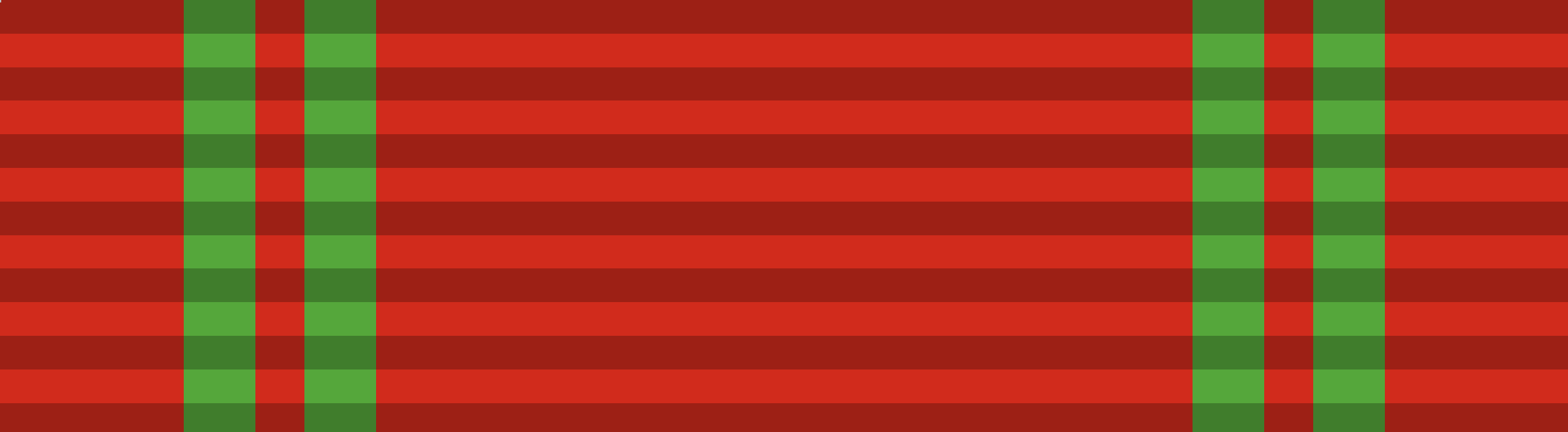
  - Member 1st Class of the Order of Oman
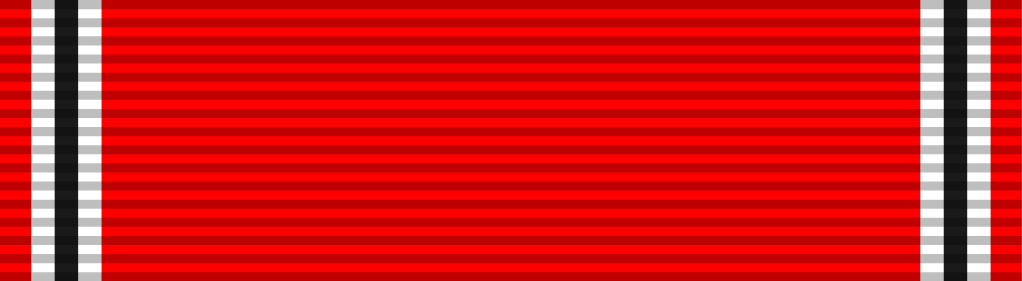
  - Member 1st Class of the Order of Establishment
  - Member 2nd Class of the Order of Sultan Qaboos
  - Member 1st Class of the Order of the Renaissance of Oman

=== Foreign honours ===
- Algeria:
  - Grand Collar (Athir) of the National Order of Merit (29 October 2024)
- Austria:
  - Grand Star of the Decoration of Honour for Services to the Republic of Austria (31 March 2001)
- Bahrain:
  - Member Exceptional Class of the Order of Sheikh Isa bin Salman Al Khalifa (24 October 2022)
- Belgium:
  - Grand Cordon of the Order of Leopold (3 December 2024)
- Brunei:
  - Member of the Royal Family Order of the Crown of Brunei (3 November 2026)
- Egypt:
  - Collar of the Order of the Nile (21 May 2023)
- Jordan:
  - Grand Cordon of the Supreme Order of the Renaissance (4 October 2022)
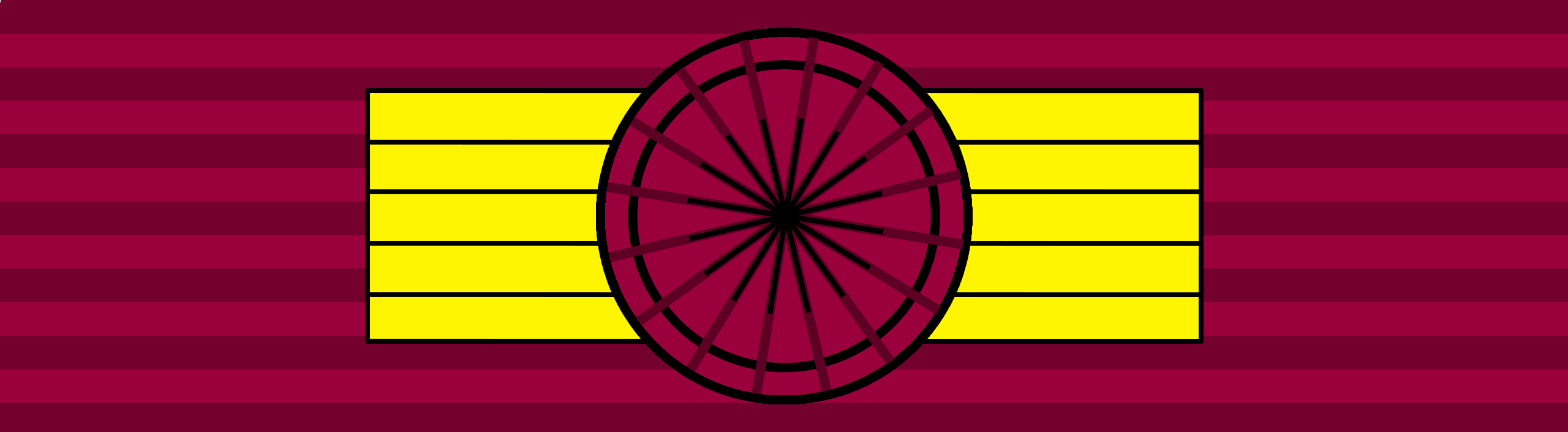
  - Collar of the Order of Al-Hussein bin Ali (22 May 2024)
- Kazakhstan:
  - Collar of the Order of the Golden Eagle (6 October 2026)
- Kuwait:
  - Collar of the Order of Mubarak the Great (6 February 2024)
- Lebanon:
  - Grand Cordon of the National Order of the Cedar (9 December 2025)
  - Grand Officer of the National Order of the Cedar (29 September 2002)
- Netherlands:
  - Knight Grand Cross of the Order of the Lion of the Netherlands (15 April 2025)
  - Knight Grand Cross of the Order of Orange-Nassau (10 January 2012)
- Qatar:
  - Sword of the Founder Sheikh Jassim bin Mohammed bin Thani (22 November 2021)
- Saudi Arabia:
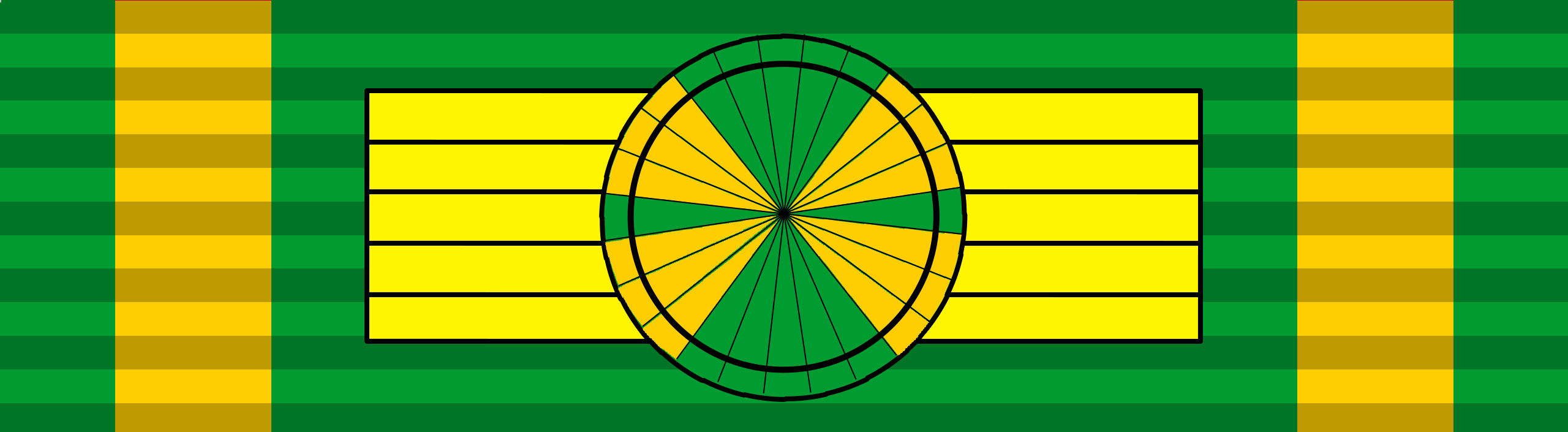
  - Collar of the Order of Abdulaziz al Saud (11 July 2021 – I Class, 24 December 2006)
- Spain:
  - Commander by Number Star of the Order of Civil Merit (13 December 1985)
  - Collar of the Order of Isabella the Catholic (29 October 2025)
- Turkey:
  - Collar of the Order of the State of the Republic of Turkey (28 November 2024)
- United Arab Emirates:
  - Collar of the Order of Zayed (27 September 2022)
- United Kingdom:
  - Honorary Knight Grand Cross of the Royal Victorian Order (GCVO) (26 November 2010)
  - Honorary Knight Grand Cross of the Order of St Michael and St George (GCMG) (15 December 2021)
  - Honorary Knight Grand Cross of the Order of the Bath (GCB) (20 October 2026)
- Uzbekistan:
  - Collar of the Order of Highest Friendship (16 November 2026)

== Notes ==
Haitham bin Tariq House of Al Said Born: 11 October 1955
Regnal titles
| Preceded by Qaboos bin Said | Sultan of Oman; 2020–present | Incumbent; Heir apparent: Theyazin bin Haitham |
