= Crown Prince of Oman =

Heir apparent to the Omani throne

- وَلِي عَهْدُ سَلْطَنَةِ عَمَّانِ
- Royal emblem of Oman

- Incumbent; Theyazin bin Haitham since 12 January 2021
- Style: His Royal Highness
- Appointer: Sultan of Oman
- Inaugural holder: Theyazin bin Haitham
- Formation: 12 January 2021; 5 years ago

The Crown Prince of Oman (Arabic: وَلِي عَهْدُ سَلْطَنَةِ عَمَّانِ, romanized: ʿWaliyy ʿAhdu Salṭanati ʿUmān) is the designated successor to the Sultan of Oman. The Crown Prince assumes power by taking an oath before the Sultan. This system is enforced by Article (10) of the Basic Statute of Oman. In the absence of the Sultan, the Crown Prince takes power.

On 12 January 2021, the Sultan of Oman established the position of the Crown Prince by a Royal Decree which amended the Basic Law of Oman, with the requirements of the position being held by the eldest son of the reigning Sultan. This made Theyazin bin Haitham, the eldest son of the Sultan, the heir apparent and first Crown Prince of the Sultanate of Oman.

== History ==
Prior to the creation of the Crown Prince title, the heir to the Omani throne would be kept a secret until the preceding Sultan's death, whereby an envelope would be opened to reveal the name of the man that the previous Sultan named as his successor. Following the death of Sultan Qaboos, who had no direct children, it was deemed by his successor Sultan Haitham that the succession process needed to be more clearer for stability and to encourage investment. Accordingly, on the 1st anniversary of his succession, he changed the law to create the title of Crown Prince so it was publicly known whom the successor was. It was also designed to prevent arguments within the Omani Royal Family as to which line the succession would follow in the event of a dispute and provide certainty for investors.

== Crown Princes of Oman (2021–present) ==
| Name | Lifespan | Reign start | Reign end | Notes | Family | Image |
|---|---|---|---|---|---|---|
| Theyazin bin Haitham: ذي يزن بن هيثم آل سعيد | 21 August 1990 (age 36) | 12 January 2021 | Incumbent | Son of Haitham bin Tariq | Al Said | |
