= Ministry of Finance (Oman) =

Coordinates: 23°36′48″N 58°35′42″E

Sultanate of Oman Ministry of Finance
- وزارة المالية
- National emblem of Oman

Agency overview
- Formed: January 1941
- Jurisdiction: Government of Oman
- Headquarters: Muscat (Oman)
- Agency executive: Sultan bin Salem bin Saeed al-Habsi, Minister
- Website: Official website

The Ministry of Finance (MOF) is the governmental body in the Sultanate of Oman responsible for all government financial matters.

The current Finance Minister is Sultan bin Salem bin Saeed al-Habsi.

== History ==
The first financial agency was established in January 1941, and the financial affairs were managed by Sultan of Oman. The name of the ministry of changed from the Ministry of Finance and Economy to the Ministry of Finance in the year 1995.

== Ministers ==
Secretaries of financial affairs, appointed by Sultan

- D. V. McCullum, 1920
- Mohammed bim Ahmed Al Ghashan, 1920-1925
- Bertram Thomas 1925-1930
- Stuart Edwin Hedgecock, 1930-1931
- Reginald George Evelyn William Alban, 1931-1932
- Cornelius James Pelly, 1968 - 1970
- Philip Aldous, 1970 - 1972

Sultan of Oman was nominally the Minister of Finance from January 1972 until August 2020. There was a minister responsible for financial affairs.

- Abd al Hafiz Salem Rajab, January 1972 - 1973 (minister of economy)
- John Townsend (born 1928), 1972 - 1975 (secretary of economic affairs)
- Qais Al-Zawawi, 1982 - September 1995
- Ahmed bin Abdul Nabi al Makki, 1995 - March 2011
- Darwish bin Ismail al-Balushi, March 2011 - August 2020

Minister of Finance

- Sultan bin Salem bin Saeed al-Habsi, August 2020 -
