= Taqah =

Taqah Ţāqah
- Wilayat
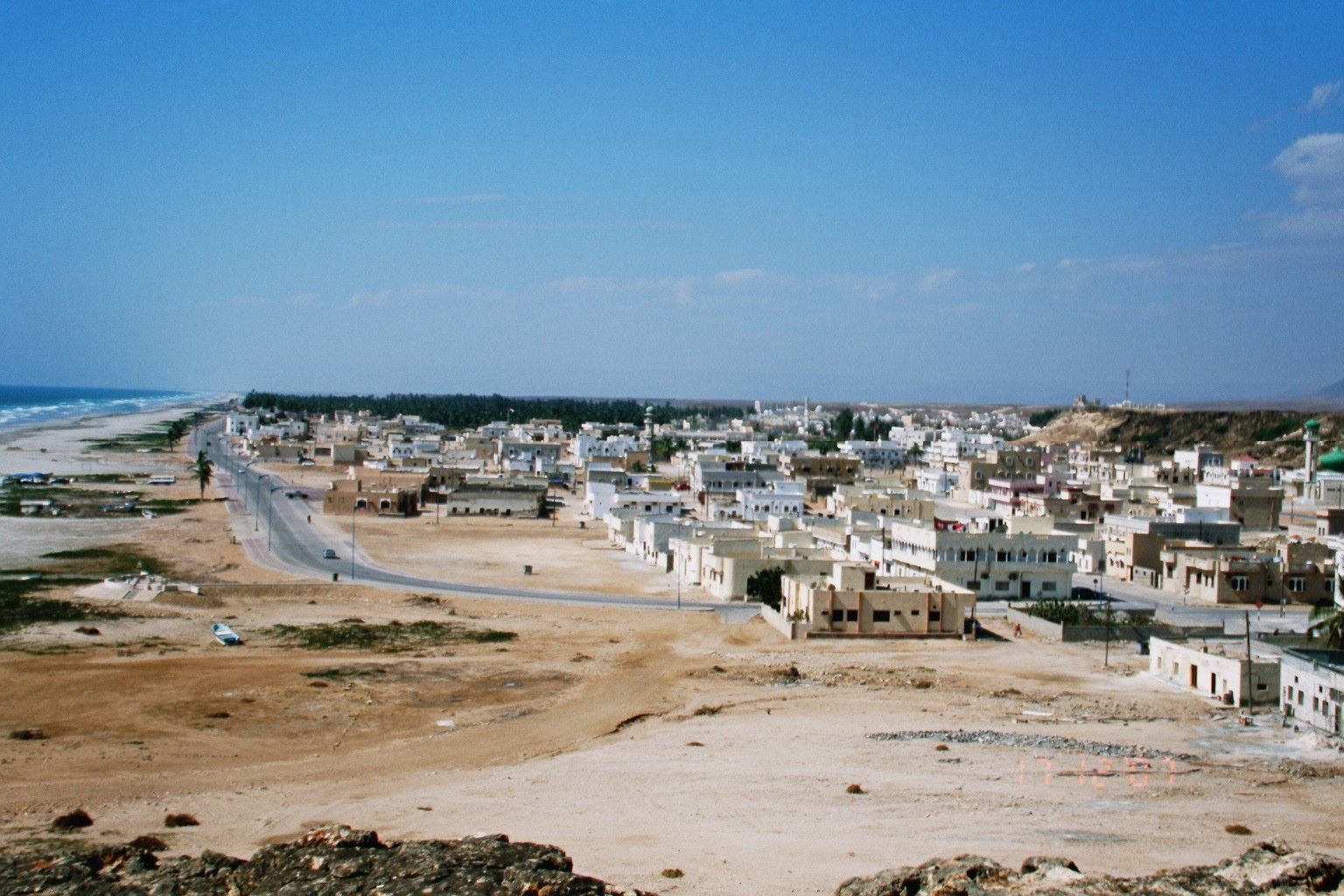
- Taqah scene

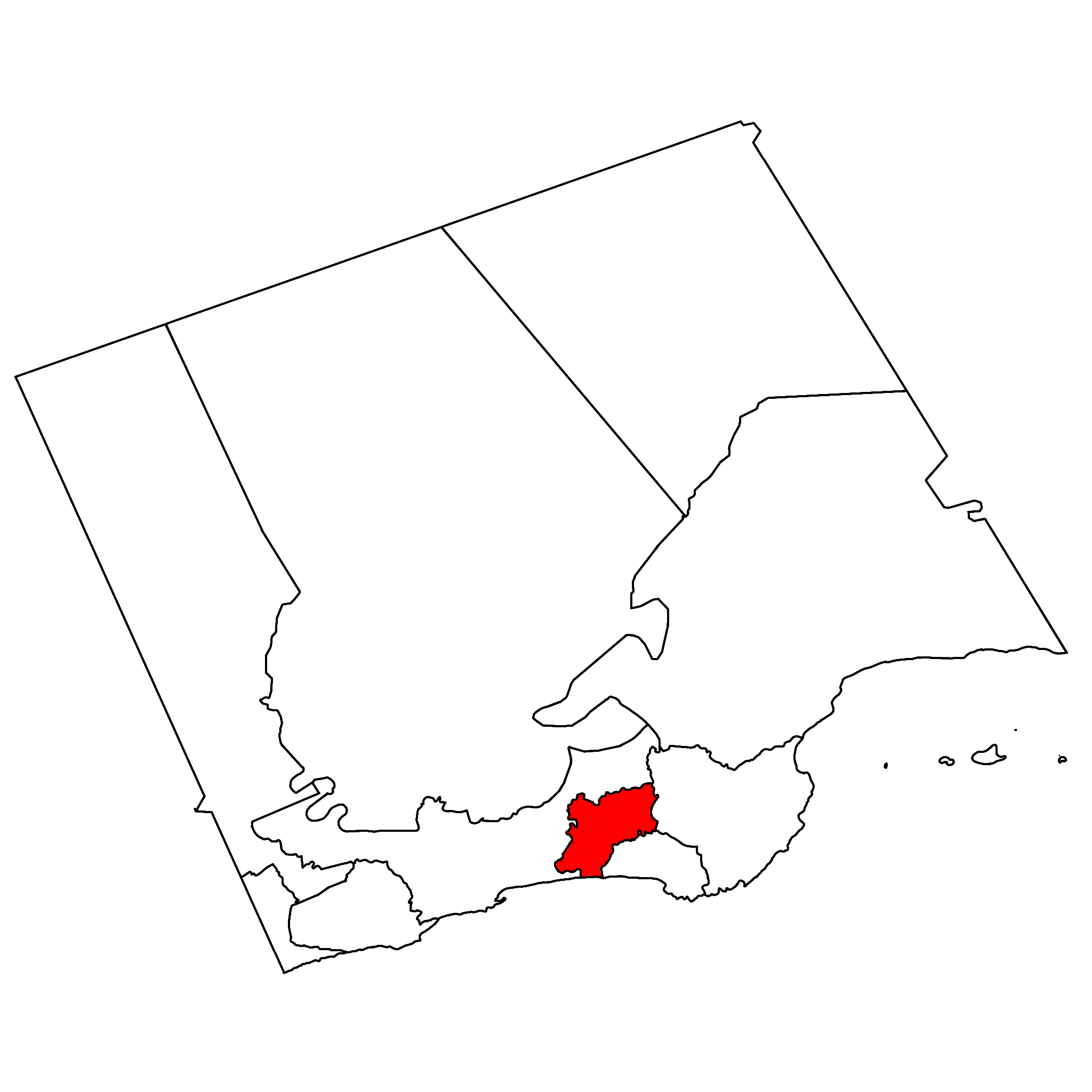
- The wilayat of Taqah in the Dhofar Governorate

- Location in Oman
- Coordinates: 17°2′14″N 54°24′13″E
- Country: Oman
- Governorate: Dhofar Governorate

Population (2010)
  - Total: 18,218
- Time zone: UTC+4 (GST)

Taqah (Arabic: طاقة, romanized: Ţāqah) is a wilayat (province) and coastal town of the Dhofar Governorate, in southwestern Oman. It is located at about 17°2′14″N 54°24′13″E. The nature of the Taqah wilayat is diverse, as it is a coastal province with beaches, plains, and mountains. It is also known for the presence of caves, such as the caves of Taqah and the caves of Wadi Darbat. Additionally, Taqah has two inlets, Khawr Taqah and Khawr Rawri, both declared as protected areas within the Alkhawr Coastal Nature Reserves by virtue of Royal Decree No. 49/97. The wilayat also features the springs of Ain Khawr Taqah and Ain Darbat, known for their waterfalls.

== History ==
In 1908, J.G. Lorimer recorded Rakhyut in his Gazetteer of the Persian Gulf, noting its location as the easternmost village in the Dhufar Proper two miles west of Khor Rori and 20 miles west of Mirbat. He wrote:

A village of about 20 mud huts and one stone building, chiefly inhabited by Mashani Qaras (Al-Hakli). There are three or four families of Sharifs and a few of Mashaikh; these latter classes act as mediators and go-betweens to the Bedouins, among whom their persons are sacred, and they take charge of the flocks and herds of Bedouins while in the plains.

The mountains here come down close to the sea and make a pleasing background. There are many ancient remains, standing columns, stone sarcophagi, etc. There was formerly a good harbour here, but it has now become silted up. This, with a little outlay, could be re-opened.

== Places of interest ==
- Approx. 2 km after the western entrance to the town there is a mosque named Shaikh Al-Afeef (Arabic: الشيخ العفيف). In its cemetery Mazoon bint Ahmad Al Mashani, the mother of Sultan Qaboos bin Said Al Said, is buried. Under identical marble gravestones an uncle and a grandfather of the Sultans are buried.
- Taqah and its surrounding areas offer natural attractions, such as beaches and coastal scenery.
- Tourists often visit historical sites like Taqah Castle to learn about the region's history and architecture.

== See also ==
- Dhofar Rebellion
