= Basic Statute of Oman =

Cornerstone of the Omani legal system

The Basic Statute of the State (Arabic: النظام الأساسي للدولة), also referred to as the Basic Law, is the cornerstone of the Omani legal system and it operates as a constitution for the country. The Basic Statute was issued in 1996 and thus far has been amended twice: once in 2011 as a response to protests occurring during the Arab Spring, solidifying the role of the legislature, and once in 2021 inter alia to introduce procedures for the appointment of a crown prince and new rules for parliament.

The Basic Statute stipulates that the system of governance is Sultani hereditary in the male descendants of Sayyid Turki bin Said bin Sultan, that the Sultan is the Head of the State and the Supreme Commander of Armed Forces, that he is to preside over the Council of Ministers, and that he is responsible for promulgating laws and appointing judges.

The Basic Statute also stipulates that the Council of Ministers is the body responsible for implementing the general policies of the state, that the Council of Oman, which is made up of the State Council, an appointed body, and the Shura Council, an elected body, is responsible for reviewing legislation and submitting it to the Sultan for royal assent, and that the judiciary is guaranteed independence.

== Rights ==
The Basic Law states that "freedom of opinion and the expression of it through speech, writing, and all other means of expression is guaranteed within the limits of the law."

Although Islam is Oman's state religion, the Basic Law guarantees the "freedom to practice religious rites in accordance with recognized customs...provided that it does not disrupt public order or conflict with accepted standards of behavior."

The Basic Law forbids discrimination founded on "sex, ethnicity, color, language, religion, sect, domicile or social status."
