= Muscat Governorate =

Governorate of Oman

Coordinates: 23.61°N 58.54°E

Muscat محافظة مسقط
- Governorate
- Muscat, Governorate of Oman
- Interactive map outlining Muscat Governorate
- Country: Oman
- Capital: Muscat

Government
  - Governor: Bilarab bin Haitham

Area
  - Total: 6,500 km^{2} (2,500 sq mi)

Population (July 2020)
  - Total: 1,302,509
  - Density: 355.4/km^{2} (920/sq mi)
- Time zone: UTC+4
- Area code: 24

Muscat (Arabic: محافظة مسقط) is a governorate of the Sultanate of Oman. Its provincial capital is Muscat, which is the largest city and only metropolis of Oman. Muscat Governorate, commonly referred to as Muscat City, is the seat of government and contains Oman's first cruise and cargo port and oil port. It had a population of 1,302,440 in July 2020.

The current Governor of Muscat is Bilarab bin Haitham.

== Provinces ==
Muscat Governorate consists of six provinces (wilayat):

- Al Amarat
- Bawshar
- Muscat (Old Town)
- Muttrah
- Qurayyat
- Al Seeb

== Governors ==
Muscat has had following governors.

- Shihab bin Faisal Al Said, 1960 - 1970
- Thuwaini bin Shihab Al Said, 1970 - 1984
- Al-Mutasim bin Hamoud Al Busaidi, 1984 - 1985
- Sultan bin Hamad Al-Samar Al Busaidi, 1985 - 1991
- Al-Mutasim bin Hamoud Al Busaidi, 1991 - 2011
- Saud bin Hilal Al Busaidi, 7 March 2011 - 12 January 2026

== Demographics ==
Historical population
Census year	Pop.	±% p.a.
1993	549,273	—
2003	632,073	+1.41%
2010	775,878	+2.97%
2020	1,302,440	+5.32%
Source: Citypopulation
