= Oman =

Country in West Asia

Sultanate of Oman سَلْطَنَة عُمَانْ (Arabic) Salṭanat ʿUmān
- Flag Emblem
- Motto: ٱللَّهُ، ٱلْوَطَنُ، ٱلسُّلْطَانُ Allāh, al-Waṭan, as-Sulṭān "God, Nation, Sultan"
- Anthem: تَحِيَّة السُّلْطَانِ Taḥīyah al-Sulṭān "Salute to the Sultan"
- Capital and largest city: Muscat; 23°35′20″N 58°24′30″E
- Official languages: Arabic
- Common languages: Omani Arabic
- Religion (2023) (Note: For both Omani and foreign citizens.): 95% Islam (official); 45% Sunni Islam; 45% Ibadi Islam; 5% Shia Islam; 1.67% Christianity; 1.67% Hinduism; 1.66% other
- Demonym: Omani
- Government: Unitary Islamic absolute monarchy
  - Sultan and Prime Minister: Haitham bin Tariq
  - Crown Prince: Theyazin bin Haitham
  - Deputy Prime Minister: Asa'ad bin Tariq Shihab bin Tariq Theyazin bin Haitham
- Legislature: Council of Oman
  - Upper house: Council of State
  - Lower house: Consultative Assembly

Establishment
  - Magan Civilization: 3000 BCE
  - Azd tribe migration: 130
  - Imamate established: 751
  - Nabhani dynasty: 1154
  - Portuguese rule: 1507–1656
  - Ya'rubi dynasty: 1624
  - Omani Empire: 1696
  - Al Bu Said dynasty: 20 November 1744
  - Muscat and Oman: 8 January 1856
  - Sultanate of Oman: 9 August 1970
  - Basic Statute: 6 November 1996

Area
  - Total: 315,331 (Note: Al Wusta is approx. 82,471 which changed the amount to 315,331) km^{2} (121,750 sq mi) (69th)
  - Water (%): negligible

Population
  - 2026 estimate: ▲5,398,645 (121st)
  - 2020 census: 4,471,148
  - Density: 17/km^{2} (44.0/sq mi) (214th)
- GDP (PPP): 2026 estimate
  - Total: ▲$250.086 billion (76th)
  - Per capita: ▲$46,196 (53rd)
- GDP (nominal): 2026 estimate
  - Total: ▲$121.397 billion (70th)
  - Per capita: ▲$22,425 (55th)
- Gini (2018): 30.75 medium inequality
- HDI (2023): ▲0.858 very high (50th)
- Currency: Omani rial (OMR)
- Time zone: UTC+4 (GST)
- DST is not observed.
- Date format: dd.mm.yyyy
- Calling code: +968
- ISO 3166 code: OM
- Internet TLD: .om, عمان.
- Website gov.om

Oman, (Note: /oʊˈmɑːn/ oh-MAHN; Arabic: عُمَان, romanised: ʿUmān, pronounced [ʕʊˈmaːn].) officially the Sultanate of Oman, (Note: Arabic: سَلْطَنَة عُمَانْ, romanised: Salṭanat ʿUmān.) is a country in the southeastern Arabian Peninsula in West Asia. It shares land borders with Saudi Arabia, the United Arab Emirates, and Yemen, and maritime borders with Iran and Pakistan. Its coastline extends along the Arabian Sea to the southeast and the Gulf of Oman to the northeast. The exclaves of Madha and Musandam are surrounded by the United Arab Emirates on their land borders, while Musandam's coastal boundaries are formed by the Strait of Hormuz and the Gulf of Oman. With an area of 315,331 km^{2} (121,750 sq mi) and a population of approximately 5.46 million, Oman is the third-largest country on the Arabian Peninsula. Muscat is the capital and largest city, Islam is the state religion, and Arabic is the official language.

Oman has been continuously ruled by the Al Bu Said dynasty since 1744. Beginning in the 17th century, Oman emerged as a major regional power, expelling the Portuguese from its coastal possessions and establishing an empire that competed with the British and Portuguese for influence in the Persian Gulf and the Indian Ocean. At its peak in the 19th century, Omani influence and control extended across the Strait of Hormuz to what later became Iran and Pakistan, and as far south as Zanzibar. In the 20th century, Oman came under the influence of the British Empire while de jure remaining sovereign. After the Dhofar rebellion and the 1970 Omani coup d'état, the state of Muscat and Oman transitioned into the modern state under Qaboos bin Said.

Oman is an absolute monarchy ruled by a sultan, who serves as both head of state and head of government. Executive authority is exercised through the Council of Ministers, while the bicameral Council of Oman consists of the appointed Council of State and the elected Consultative Assembly. Qaboos bin Said served as sultan from 1970 until his death in 2020. His nearly five-decade reign marked the beginning of a period of rapid modernization now known as the Omani Renaissance, which saw a rise in the country's living standards, the abolition of slavery, the end of the Dhofar Rebellion, and the promulgation of Oman's constitution. In 2020, Haitham bin Tariq succeeded Qaboos as the sultan of Oman.

Oman's oil reserves are ranked as the 22nd largest globally. In 2010, the United Nations Development Programme recognised Oman as the most improved country in the world in terms of development during the preceding 40 years. A portion of Oman's economy involves tourism, and trade of fish, dates and other agricultural produce. The World Bank classifies Oman as a high-income economy. As of 2024, Oman ranks as the 42nd most peaceful country in the world in the Global Peace Index and the third-most peaceful country in the Middle East and North Africa. Oman is a member of the United Nations, the Arab League, the Gulf Cooperation Council, the Non-Aligned Movement, and the Organisation of Islamic Cooperation.

== Etymology ==
The oldest known written mention of "Oman" is found on a tomb in the Mleiha Archeological Center in the United Arab Emirates, dated to around 220 BC, where it is written as 𐩲𐩣𐩬 in Ancient South Arabian and 𐡏𐡌𐡍 in Aramaic. The name "Oman" is believed to predate Pliny the Elder's reference to "Omana" and Ptolemy's reference to "Omanon". (Ὄμανον ἐμπόριον in Greek).

Beginning in the 19th century, most writers localised Omana with Sohar. This changed, however, with the advent of archaeology.

The city or region is commonly etymologised in Arabic as deriving from ʿāmin or ʿamūn, meaning 'settled' people, in contrast to the nomadic Bedouins. While some theories propose an eponymous founder—such as Oman bin Ibrahim al-Khalil, Oman bin Siba' bin Yaghthan bin Ibrahim, and Oman bin Qahtan—others suggest that "Oman" originates from a valley in Ma'rib, Yemen. This valley is presumed to be the ancestral homeland of the Azd, an ancient Bedouin tribe mentioned in pre-Islamic inscriptions, particularly in Sabaic inscriptions from the reign of Sha'r Awtar (210–230 CE).

Oman has been known by other names. The ancient Sumerians and the Mesopotamians called it "Magan", a reference to the Magan civilisation, while the Persians called it Mazun, derived from the word "Muzn", meaning clouds and abundant flowing water, which explains the establishment and prosperity of agriculture in Oman since ancient times and the stability and civilisation that accompanied it. The name "Oman" is mentioned in Arabic sources as an independent region. Al-Istakhri and Ibn Hawqal referred to this in their sayings: "Oman is a region with independent regions with spacious people". Ibn Khaldun was more explicit in his definition of Oman. He mentioned it among the Arab regions that emerged as independent states in the Arabian Peninsula, namely Yemen, the Hijaz, Hadhramaut, Ash Shihr, and Oman. He described its system of government, saying that it was a "sole sultanic region."

== History ==
=== Prehistory ===
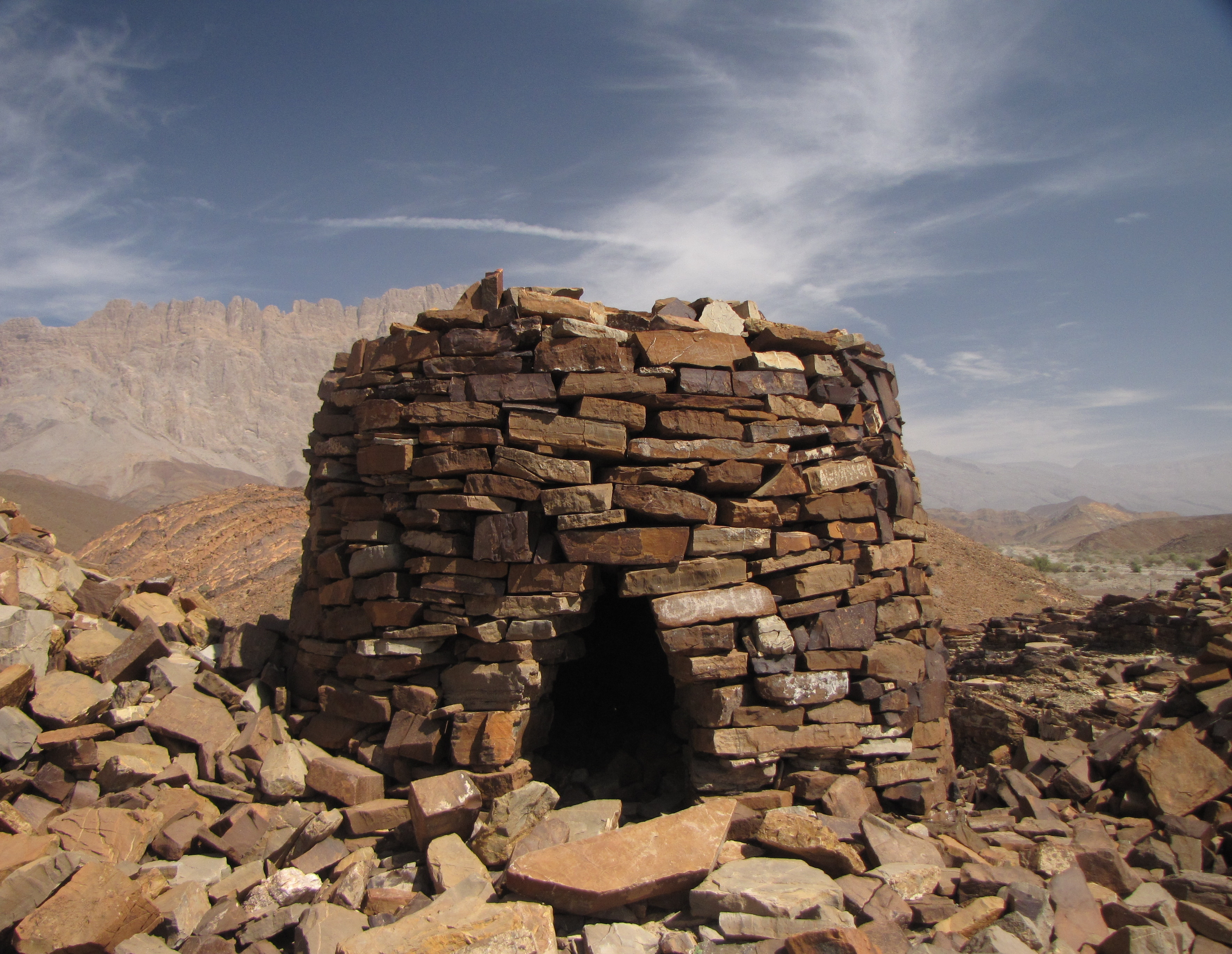
The Archaeological Sites of Bat, Al-Khutm and Al-Ayn in Ad Dhahirah, built in the 3rd millennium BCE and a UNESCO World Heritage Site

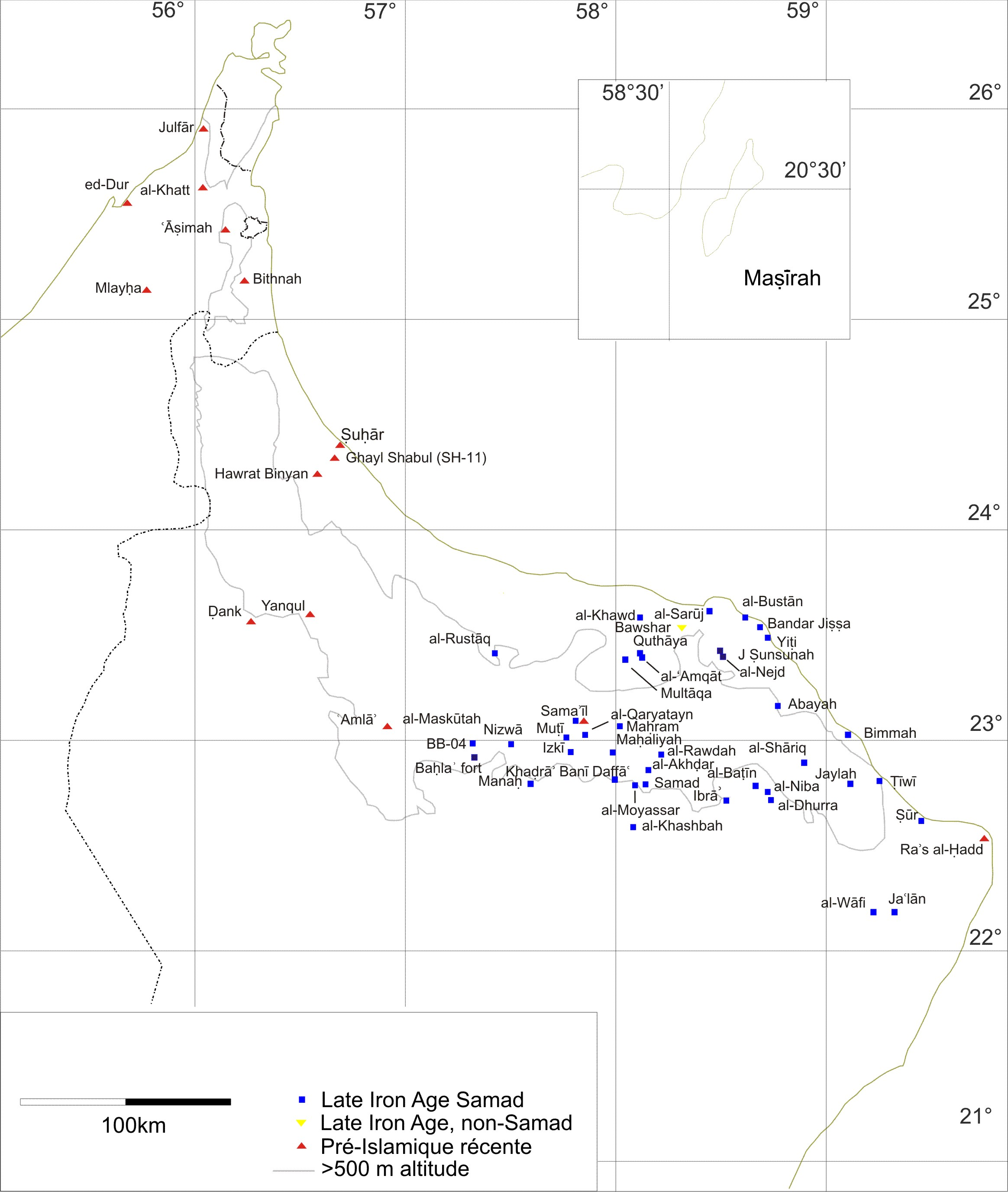
Late Iron Age sites in Oman

Al Aybut Al Awal, in the Dhofar Governorate of Oman, a site was discovered in 2011 containing more than 100 surface scatters of stone tools, belonging to a regionally specific African lithic industry—the late Nubian Complex—known previously only from the northeast and Horn of Africa. Two optically stimulated luminescence age estimates place the Arabian Nubian Complex at 106,000 years old. This supports the proposition that early human populations moved from Africa into Arabia during the Late Pleistocene.

As of 2011, surveys have uncovered Palaeolithic and Neolithic sites on the eastern coast. Main Palaeolithic sites include Saiwan-Ghunaim in the Barr al-Hikman. Archaeological remains are particularly numerous for the Bronze Age Umm an-Nar and Wadi Suq periods. At the archaeological sites of Bat, al-Janah, and al-Ayn wheel-turned pottery, hand-made stone vessels, metals industry artifacts, and monumental architecture have been preserved.

=== Ancient history ===
==== Magan civilisation ====
Sumerian tablets referred to Oman as "Magan" and in the Akkadian language "Makan", a name that links Oman's ancient copper resources. This is a clear reference to the Magan civilisation, an ancient region in what is now modern day Oman and United Arab Emirates, which was referred to in Sumerian cuneiform texts of around 2300 BC and existed until 550 BC as a source of copper and diorite for Mesopotamia. There are six periods of human settlement with distinctive behaviours in Northern Oman before Islam, which include the Hafit period from 3,200 to 2,600 BC, the Umm Al Nar culture from 2,600 to 2,000 BC, and the Wadi Suq culture from 2,000 to 1,300 BC.

==== Iron Age to pre-Islamic period ====
During the 8th century BC, it is believed that the Yaarub, the descendant of Qahtan, ruled the entire region of Yemen, including Oman. Wathil bin Himyar bin Abd-Shams (Saba) bin Yashjub (Yaman) bin Yarub bin Qahtan later ruled Oman. It is thus believed that the Yaarubah were the first settlers in Oman from Yemen.

=== Persian period ===
In the 1970s and 1980s, scholars like John C. Wilkinson believed by virtue of oral history that in the 6th century BC, the Achaemenids exerted control over the Omani peninsula, most likely ruling from a coastal centre such as Suhar. The northern half of Oman was presumably part of the Maka satrapy of the Persian Achaemenid Empire. By the time of the conquests of Alexander the Great, the satrapy may have existed in some form.

Central Oman has its own indigenous Samad Late Iron Age cultural assemblage named eponymously from Samad al-Shan. In the northern part of the Oman Peninsula the recent pre-Islamic period began in the 3rd century BC and extends into the 3rd century AD. Whether or not Persians brought south-eastern Arabia under their control is a moot point, since the lack of Persian archaeological finds speak against this belief. Armand-Pierre Caussin de Perceval suggests that Shammir bin Wathil bin Himyar recognised the authority of Cyrus the Great over Oman in 536 BC.

The Omani Kingdom was subdued by the Sasanian Empire's forces under Vahrez during the Aksumite–Persian wars. The 4,000-strong Sasanian garrison was headquartered at Jamsetjerd/Jamshedgird (modern Jebel Gharabeh, also known as Felej al-Sook)

=== Azd tribal migration ===
Over centuries, from the 2nd half of the 1st millennium BC, waves of Semitic speaking peoples migrated from central and western Arabia to the east. The most important of these migrating tribes are known as Azd. they made a living by fishing, farming, herding or stock breeding. Further, many present-day Omani families trace their ancestral roots to other parts of Arabia. Arab migration to Oman started from northern-western and south-western Arabia and those who chose to settle had to compete with the indigenous population for the best arable land. When Arab tribes started to migrate to Oman, there were two distinct groups. One group, a segment of the Azd tribe migrated from Yemen in 120/200 AD following the collapse of Marib Dam, while the other group migrated a few centuries before the birth of Islam from Nejd (present-day Saudi Arabia), named Nizari. Other historians believe that the Yaarubah from Qahtan, which belong to an older branch, were the first settlers of Oman from Yemen, and then came the Azd.

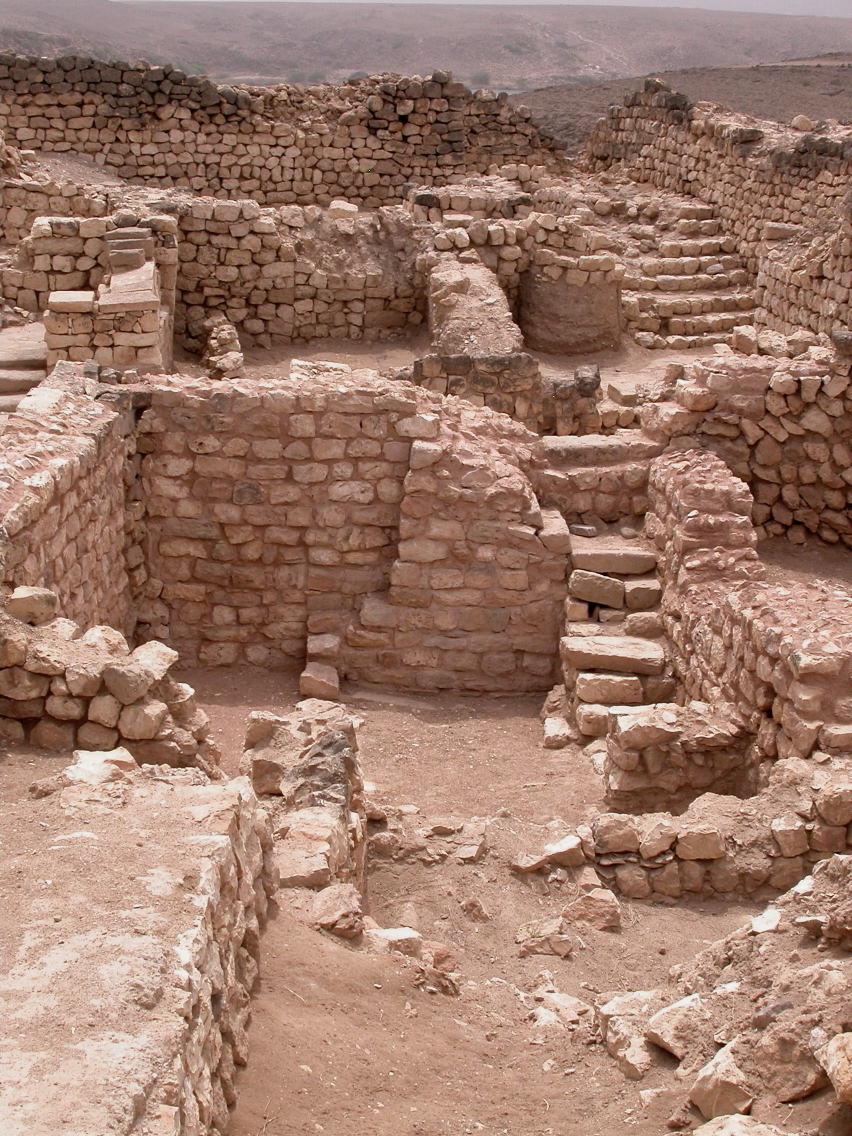
Ruins of Khor Rori, built between 100 BCE and 100 CE

The Azd settlers in Oman are descendants of Nasr bin Azd and were later known as "the Al-Azd of Oman". Seventy years after the first Azd migration, another branch of Alazdi under Malik bin Fahm, the founder of Kingdom of Tanukhites on the west of Euphrates, is believed to have settled in Oman. According to Al-Kalbi, Malik bin Fahm was the first settler of Alazd. He is said to have first settled in Qalhat. By this account, Malik, with an armed force of more than 6000 men and horses, fought against the Marzban, who served an ambiguously named Persian king in the battle of Salut in Oman and eventually defeated the Persian forces. This account is, however, semi-legendary and seems to condense multiple centuries of migration and conflict as well as an amalgamation of various traditions from not only the Arab tribes but also the region's original inhabitants.

=== Islam ===
During the 7th century AD, Omanis came in contact with and accepted Islam, with consolidation taking place in the Ridda Wars in 632. The conversion of Omanis to Islam is ascribed to Amr ibn al-As, who was sent by the Islamic prophet Muhammad during the Expedition of Zaid ibn Haritha (Hisma). Amr was dispatched to meet with Jaifer and Abd, the sons of Julanda who ruled Oman. They appear to have readily embraced Islam.

==== Battle of Dibba ====
Following the death of the prophet Muhammad in 632, a series of campaigns were launched by the Rashidun Caliphate against tribes that had renounced their allegiance to Medina. In Oman, the rebellion was led by Laqit ibn Malik al-Azdi, known as Dhu al-Taj ("The Crowned One"), who seized control of much of the country. In response, the caliph Abu Bakr dispatched forces under Hudhayfa ibn Mihsan and Arfaja ibn Harthama, joined by the Omani rulers Jaifar and Abd. The opposing armies met at the Battle of Dibba (now Dibba Al-Hisn, United Arab Emirates) where the rebels were decisively defeated. The victory restored Rashidun authority over Oman and secured the region's incorporation into the expanding Islamic state.

=== Imamate of Oman ===
Omani Azd used to travel to Basra for trade, which was a centre of Islam, during the Umayyad Caliphate. Omani Azd were granted a section of Basra, where they could settle and attend to their needs. Many of the Omani Azd who settled in Basra became wealthy merchants and, under their leader al-Muhallab ibn Abi Sufra, started to expand their influence of power eastwards towards Khorasan.

Ibadism originated in Basra through its founder, Abd Allah ibn Ibad, as a moderate branch of the Kharijites, an Islamic sect that split from the Muhakkima. These groups initially supported Imam Ali during the First Fitna but turned away after rejecting arbitration at the Battle of Siffin in AD 657. around the year 650; the Omani Azd in Iraq would subsequently adopt this as their predominant faith. Later, al-Hajjaj, the governor of Iraq, came into conflict with the Ibadis, which forced them back to Oman. Among those who returned was the scholar Jaber bin Zaid. His return (and the return of many other scholars) greatly enhanced the Ibadhi movement in Oman. Alhajjaj also made an attempt to subjugate Oman, then ruled by Suleiman and Said (the sons of Abbad bin Julanda). Alhajjaj dispatched Mujjaah bin Shiwah, who was confronted by Said bin Abbad. This confrontation devastated Said's army, after which he and his forces retreated to the Jebel Akhdar (mountains). Mujjaah and his forces went after Said, successfully flushing them out from hiding in Wadi Mastall. Mujjaah later moved towards the coast, where he confronted Suleiman bin Abbad. The battle was won by Suleiman's forces. Alhajjaj, however, sent another force (under Abdulrahman bin Suleiman); he eventually won the war, taking over the governance of Oman.

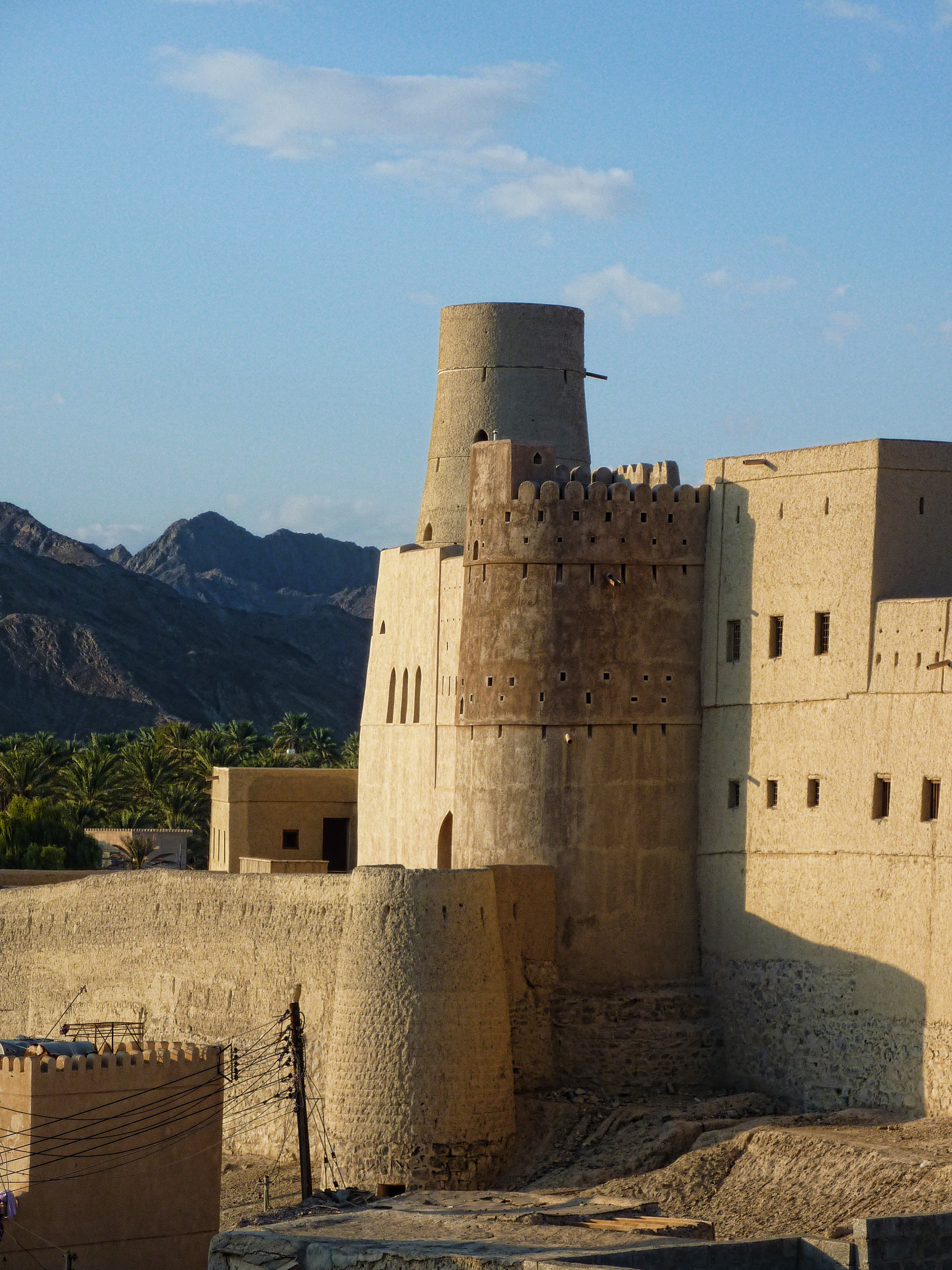
Bahla Fort, a UNESCO World Heritage site, was built between 12th and 15th c. by the Nabhani dynasty.

The first elective Imamate of Oman is believed to have been established shortly after the fall of the Umayyad Caliphate in 750/755 AD, when Janaḥ ibn ʿIbāda ibn Qays ibn ʿAmr al-Hināʾī was elected. Other scholars claim that Janaḥ ibn ʿIbāda served as a Wāli (governor) under the Umayyad dynasty (and later ratified the Imamate), and that Julanda ibn Masud was the first elected Imam of Oman, in 751 AD. The first Imamate reached its peak power in the ninth century AD. The Imamate established a maritime empire whose fleet controlled the Gulf, during the time when trade with the Abbasid Caliphate, the Far East, and Africa flourished. The authority of the Imams started to decline due to power struggles, the constant interventions of Abbasid, and the rise of the Seljuk Empire.

=== Nabhani dynasty ===
Map showing the area under control of the Nabhanids.

During the 11th and 12th centuries, the Omani coast was in the sphere of influence of the Seljuk Empire. They were expelled in 1154, when the Nabhani dynasty came to power. The Nabhanis ruled as muluk, or kings, while the Imams were reduced to largely symbolic significance. The capital of the dynasty was Bahla. The Banu Nabhan controlled the trade in frankincense on the overland route via Sohar to the Yabrin oasis, and then north to Bahrain, Baghdad and Damascus. The mango-tree was introduced to Oman during the time of Nabhani dynasty, by al-Falah bin Muhsin. The Nabhani dynasty started to deteriorate in 1507 when Portuguese colonisers captured the coastal city of Muscat, and gradually extended their control along the coast up to Sohar in the north and down to Sur in the southeast. Other historians argue that the Nabhani dynasty ended earlier in 1435 CE when conflicts between the dynasty and Hinawis arose, which led to the restoration of the elective Imamate.

=== Portuguese era ===
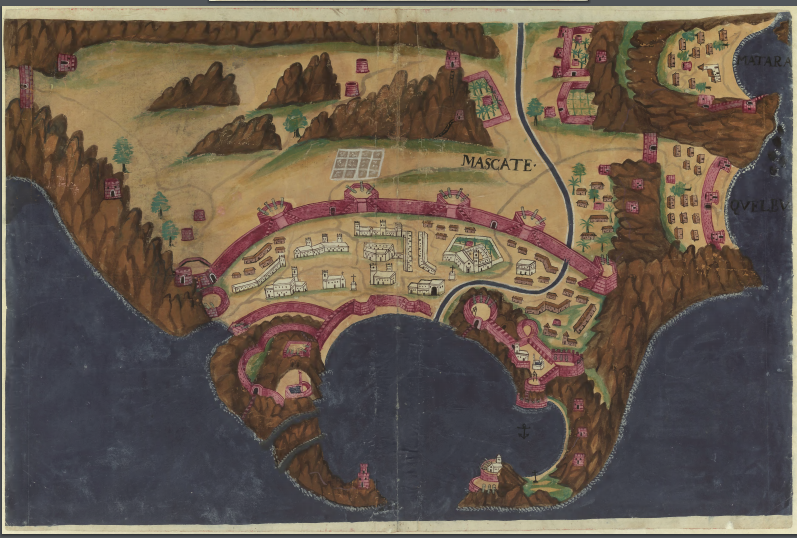
Portuguese depiction of Muscat. The Portuguese Empire ruled Oman for 143 years (1507–1650)

A decade after Vasco da Gama succeeded in his voyage around the Cape of Good Hope and to India in 1497–1498, Afonso de Albuquerque captured Hormuz and Portugal governed Oman for a 143-year period, from 1507 to 1650. In need of an outpost to protect their sea lanes, the Portuguese built up and fortified Muscat. Remnants of Portuguese architectural style still exist. Later, several more Omani cities were colonised in the early 16th century by the Portuguese, to control the entrances of the Persian Gulf and trade in the region as part of a web of fortresses in the region, from Basra to Hormuz Island.

The Ottomans contested the Persian Gulf and Oman from the Portuguese during the sixteenth century. In 1552 an Ottoman fleet briefly captured the fort in Muscat, during their fight for control of the Persian Gulf and the Indian Ocean, but soon departed after destroying the surroundings of the fortress. At the Battle of the Gulf of Oman, the Portuguese decisively routed an Ottoman fleet.

Later in the 17th century, using its bases in Oman, Portugal engaged in the largest naval battle ever fought in the Persian Gulf. The Portuguese force fought against a combined armada of the Dutch East India Company (VOC) and English East India Company supported by the Safavid empire. The result of the battle was a draw but it resulted in the loss of Portuguese influence in the Gulf.

=== Yaruba dynasty (1624–1744) ===
Following the expulsion of the Portuguese Empire, Oman became one of the powers in the western Indian Ocean from 1698 onwards.

During the 17th century, the Omanis were reunited by the Yaruba Imams. Nasir bin Murshid became the first Yaarubah Imam in 1624, when he was elected in Rustaq. Imam Nasir and his successor succeeded in the 1650s in expelling the Portuguese from their coastal domains in Oman. The Omanis over time established a maritime empire that pursued the Portuguese and expelled them from all their possessions in East Africa, which were then incorporated into the Omani domains. To capture Zanzibar Saif bin Sultan, the Imam of Oman, pressed down the Swahili Coast. A major obstacle to his progress was Fort Jesus, housing the garrison of a Portuguese settlement at Mombasa. After a two-year siege, the fort fell to Imam Saif bin Sultan in 1698. Saif bin Sultan occupied Bahrain in 1700.

=== Civil war (1718-1744) ===
Following the death of Imam Sultan bin Saif II, the Omani Empire was plunged into civil war in 1718 which weakened the dynasty as rival claimants competed for the imamate. With the power of the Yaruba Dynasty dwindling, Imam Saif eventually asked for help against his rivals from Nader Shah of Persia whose forces occupied parts of the country on two occasions between 1737 and 1744. The civil war ultimately ended with the election of Ahmad bin Said Al Busaidi as imam in 1744, marking the collapse of the Ya'aruba dynasty and the establishment of the Al Bu Said dynasty, which has ruled Oman ever since.

=== 18th and 19th centuries ===
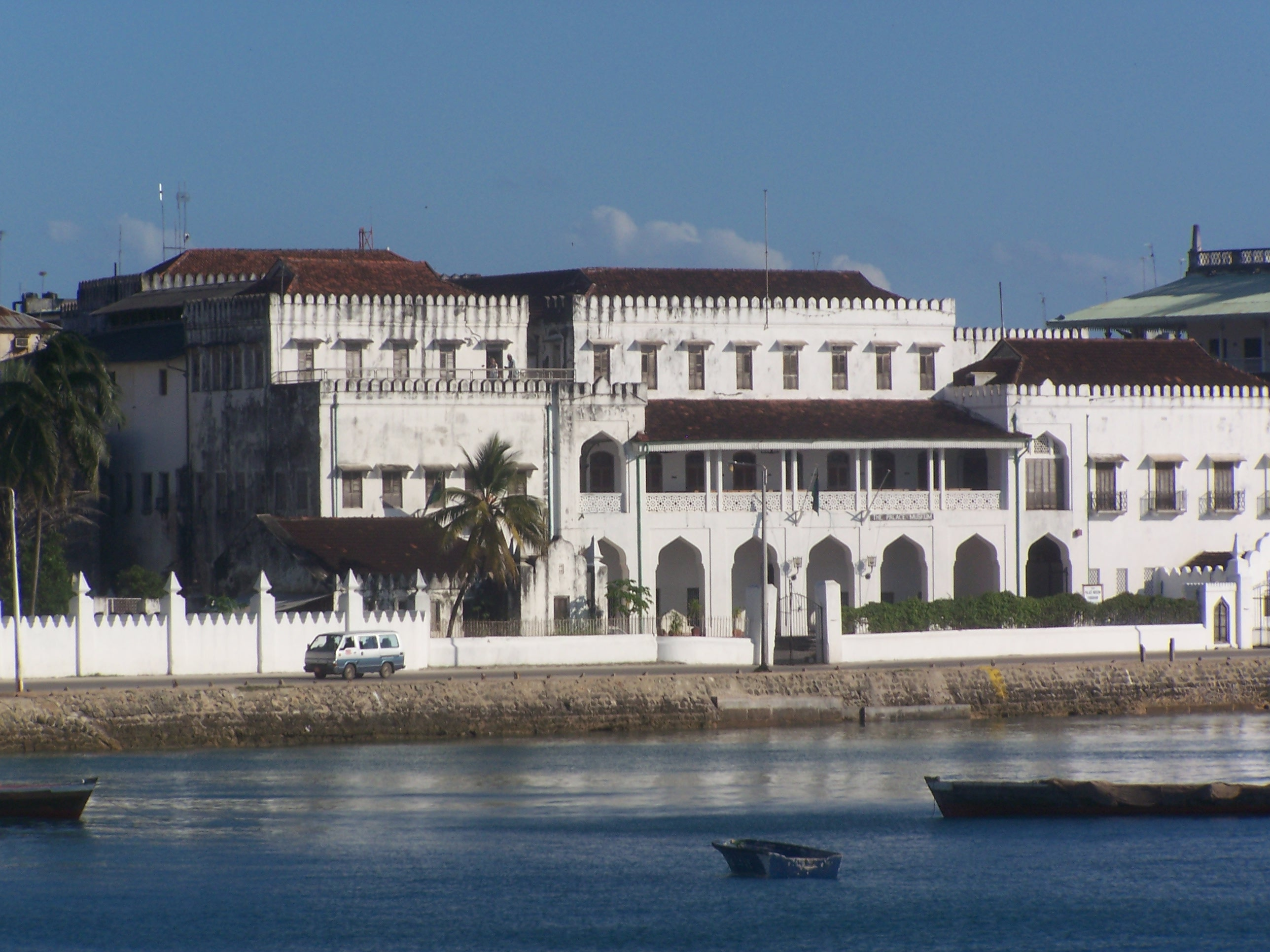
The Sultan's Palace in Zanzibar, which was once Oman's capital and residence of its sultans

After the Omanis expelled the Persians, Ahmad bin Said became the elected Imam of Oman on 20 November 1744, with Rustaq serving as the capital. His dynasty, the Al Bu Said, continues to rule Oman into the year 2026. Since the revival of the Imamate, the Omanis continued with the elective system but, provided that the person is deemed qualified, gave preference to a member of the ruling family.

Following Imam Ahmed's death in 1783, his son, Said bin Ahmed, became the elected Imam. Imam Said had been previously granted refuge and the strip of Gwadar, an area of modern-day Pakistan, by the Khan of Kalat Mir Nasir Khan. Said's son, Hamed bin Said, overthrew the governor of Muscat and soon obtained the possession of most of the fortresses in the region, giving himself the title of "Seyyid". Afterwards, Seyyid Sultan bin Ahmed, the uncle of Seyyid Hamed, took over power. Sultan's son, Seyyid Said bin Sultan, succeeded him.

During the entire 19th century, in addition to Imam Said bin Ahmed, who retained the title until he died in 1803, Azzan bin Qais was the only elected Imam of Oman. His rule started in 1868. However, the British refused to accept Imam Azzan as a ruler, as he was viewed as inimical to their interests. This view played an instrumental role in supporting the deposition of Imam Azzan in 1871 by his cousin, Sayyid Turki, a son of the late Sayyid Said bin Sultan and brother of Sultan Barghash of Zanzibar, who Britain deemed to be more acceptable.

==== British protectorate status ====
The British Empire was keen to dominate southeast Arabia to stifle the growing power of other European states and to curb the Omani maritime power that grew during the 17th century. The British empire over time, starting from the late 18th century, began to establish a series of treaties with the sultans with the objective of advancing British political and economic interest in Muscat, while granting the sultans military protection. In 1798, the first treaty between the British East India Company and the Albusaidi dynasty was signed by Sayyid Sultan bin Ahmed. The treaty aimed to block commercial competition of the French and the Dutch as well as obtain a concession to build a British factory at Bandar Abbas. A second treaty was signed in 1800, which stipulated that a British representative shall reside at the port of Muscat and manage all external affairs with other states. As the Omani Empire weakened, the British influence over Muscat grew throughout the nineteenth century.

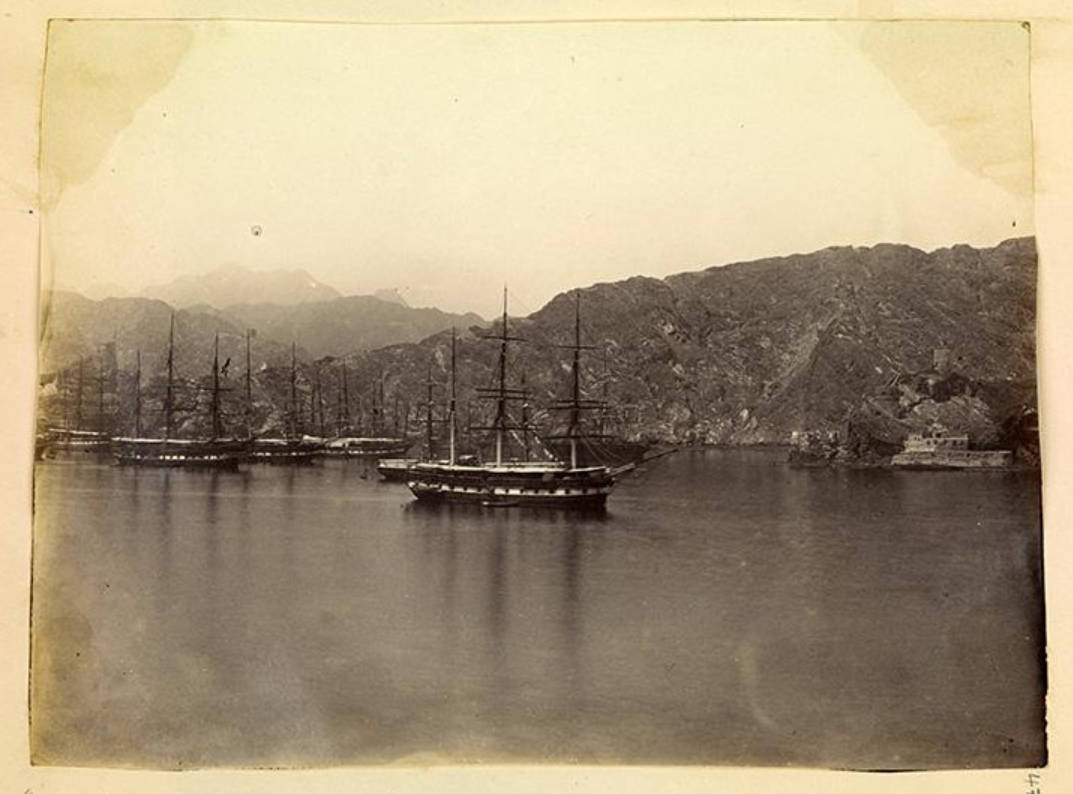
A British naval squadron in Muscat c,1870

In 1854, a deed of cession of the Omani Kuria Muria islands to Britain was signed by the sultan of Muscat and the British government. The British government achieved predominating control over Muscat, which, for the most part, impeded competition from other nations. Between 1862 and 1892, the Political Residents, Lewis Pelly and Edward Ross, played an instrumental role in securing British supremacy over the Persian Gulf and Muscat by a system of indirect governance. By the end of the 19th century, and with the loss of its African dominions and its revenues, British influence increased to the point that the sultans became heavily dependent on British loans and signed declarations to consult the British government on all important matters. The Sultanate thus came de facto under the British sphere.

Zanzibar was a valuable property as the main slave market of the Swahili Coast as well as being a major producer of cloves, and became an increasingly important part of the Omani empire, a fact reflected by the decision of the Sayyid Sa'id bin Sultan, to make it the capital of the empire in 1837. In 1856, under British arbitration, Zanzibar and Muscat became two different sultanates.

==== Treaty of Seeb ====
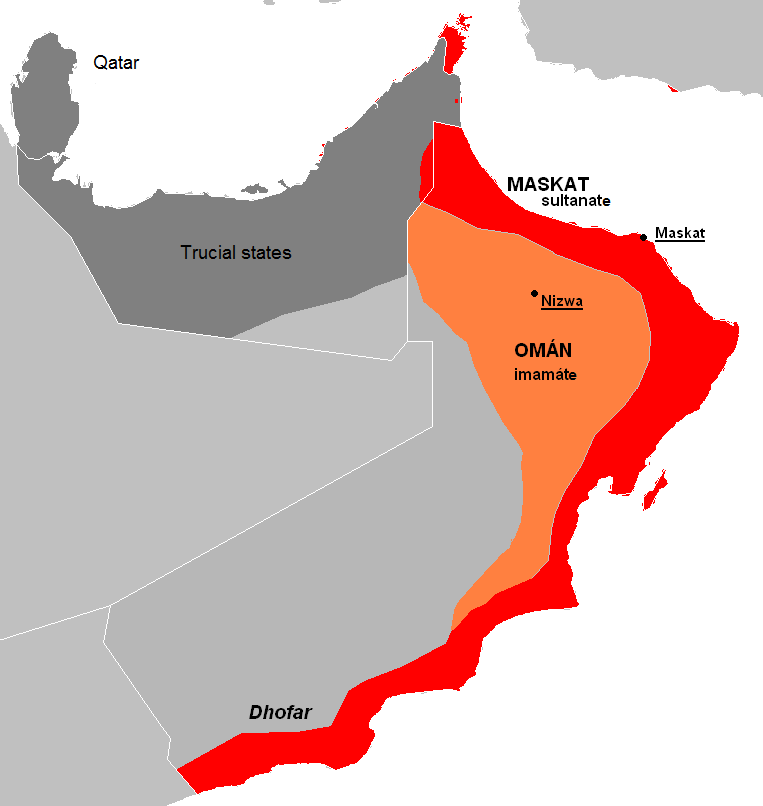
The split between the interior region (orange) and the coastal region (red) of Oman and Muscat

The Hajar Mountains, of which the Jebel Akhdar is a part, separate the country into two distinct regions: the interior, and the coastal area dominated by the capital, Muscat. The British imperial development over Muscat and Oman during the 19th century led to the renewed revival of the cause of the Imamate in the interior of Oman, which has appeared in cycles for more than 1,200 years in Oman. The British Political Agent, who resided in Muscat, owed the alienation of the interior of Oman to the vast influence of the British government over Muscat, which he described as being completely self-interested and without any regard to the social and political conditions of the locals. In 1913, Imam Salim Alkharusi instigated an anti-Muscat rebellion that lasted until 1920 when the Sultanate established peace with the Imamate by signing the Treaty of Seeb. The treaty was brokered by Britain, which had no economic interest in the interior of Oman during that point of time. The treaty granted autonomous rule to the Imamate in the interior of Oman and recognised the sovereignty of the coast of Oman, the Sultanate of Muscat. In 1920, Imam Salim Alkharusi died and Muhammad Alkhalili was elected.

On 10 January 1923, an agreement between the Sultanate and the British government was signed in which the Sultanate had to consult with the British political agent residing in Muscat and obtain the approval of the High Government of India to extract oil in the Sultanate. On 31 July 1928, the Red Line Agreement was signed between Anglo-Persian Company (later renamed British Petroleum), Royal Dutch/Shell, Compagnie Française des Pétroles (later renamed Total), Near East Development Corporation (later renamed ExxonMobil) and Calouste Gulbenkian (an Armenian businessman) to collectively produce oil in the post-Ottoman Empire region, which included the Arabian peninsula, with each of the four major companies holding 23.75 percent of the shares while Calouste Gulbenkian held the remaining 5 percent shares. The agreement stipulated that none of the signatories was allowed to pursue the establishment of oil concessions within the agreed on area without including all other stakeholders. In 1929, the members of the agreement established Iraq Petroleum Company (IPC). On 13 November 1931, Sultan Taimur bin Faisal abdicated.

=== Reign of Sultan Said (1932–1970) ===
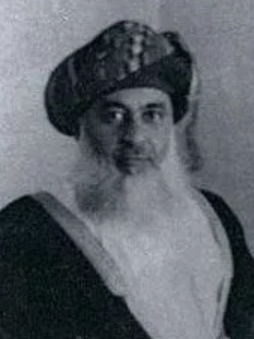
Sultan Said bin Taimur ruled from 1932 to 1970

Said bin Taimur became the sultan of Muscat officially on 10 February 1932. The rule of sultan Said, a very complex character, was backed by the British government, and has been characterised as being feudal, reactionary and isolationist. The British government maintained vast administrative control over the Sultanate as the defence secretary and chief of intelligence, chief adviser to the sultan and all ministers except for two were British. In 1937, an agreement between the sultan and Iraq Petroleum Company (IPC), a consortium of oil companies that was 23.75% British owned, was signed to grant oil concessions to IPC. After failing to discover oil in the Sultanate, IPC was intensely interested in some promising geological formations near Fahud, an area located within the Imamate. IPC offered financial support to the sultan to raise an armed force against any potential resistance by the Imamate.

Upon the outbreak of World War II, the sultan of Oman declared war on Germany on September 10, 1939. During the war, Oman had a strategic role in the defence of the United Kingdom's trade routes. Oman was never attacked during the war. In 1943, the Royal Air Force established stations on Masirah Island (RAF Masirah) and at Ras al Hadd. Air-sea rescue units were also stationed in Oman. No. 244 Squadron RAF flew Bristol Blenheim V light bombers and Vickers Wellington XIIIs out of RAF Masirah on anti-submarine duties in the Gulf of Oman and the northern Arabian Sea, while No. 209 Squadron RAF, No. 265 Squadron RAF, and No. 321 Squadron RAF flew Consolidated PBY Catalinas out of Umm Ruşayş on Masirah Island. On October 16, 1943, the German U-Boat U-533 was sunk in the Gulf of Oman after being struck by depth charges dropped by a Bristol Blenheim from No. 244 Squadron RAF. The wreck settled at a depth of 108 meters (354 feet) approximately 25 nautical miles (46 kilometres) off the Fujairah coast. 52 crew members died, with the sole survivor, Matrosengefreiter Günther Schmidt, taken aboard HMIS Hiravati near Khor Fakkan and made a prisoner of war. The wreck is now a popular recreational diving site.

The December 1951 Treaty of Friendship, Commerce and Navigation (covering commerce, oil reserves and navigation) between Oman and the United Kingdom recognised the Sultanate of Muscat and Oman as a fully independent state.

In 1955, an exclave of coastal Makran strip was ceded to Pakistan and made a district of its Balochistan province, while Gwadar remained in Oman. On 8 September 1958, Pakistan purchased the Gwadar enclave from Oman for US$3 million. (Note: Gwadar remained an Omani possession as part of the Sultanate until September 1958) Gwadar then became a tehsil in the Makran district.

==== Jebel Akhdar War ====
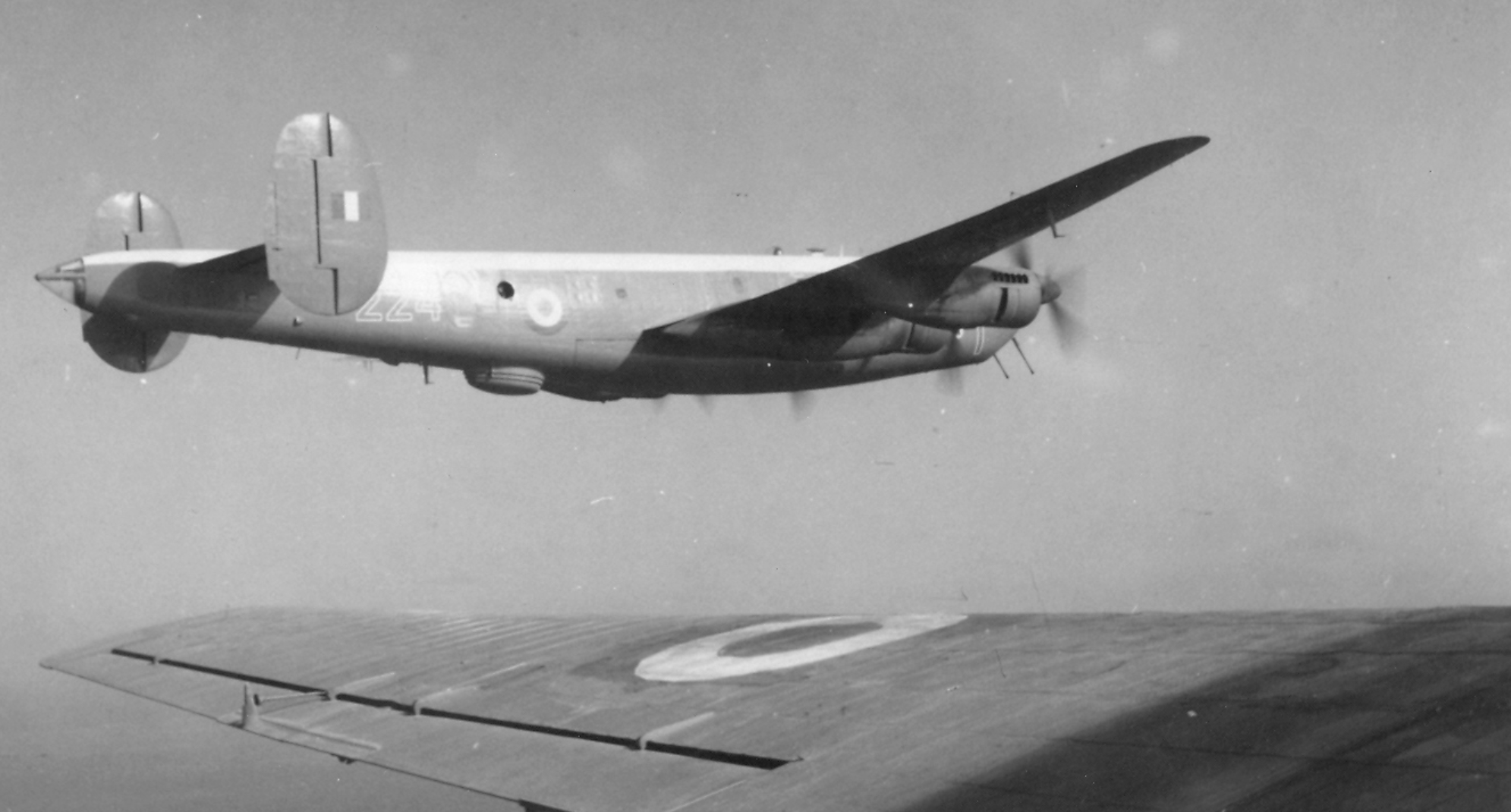
Shackleton of the RAF flying in formation near Masirah Airbase during the Jebel Akhdar War

Sultan Said bin Taimur expressed his interest in occupying the Imamate right after the death of Imam Alkhalili, thus taking advantage of any potential instability that might occur within the Imamate when elections were due, to the British government. The British political agent in Muscat believed that the only method of gaining access to the oil reserves in the interior was by assisting the sultan in taking over the Imamate. In 1946, the British government offered arms and ammunition, auxiliary supplies and officers to prepare the sultan to attack the interior of Oman. In May 1954, Imam Alkhalili died and Ghalib Alhinai was elected Imam. Relations between the Sultan Said bin Taimur, and Imam Ghalib Alhinai frayed over their dispute about oil concessions.

In December 1955, Sultan Said bin Taimur sent troops of the Muscat and Oman Field Force to occupy the main centres in Oman, including Nizwa, the capital of the Imamate of Oman, and Ibri. The Omanis in the interior led by Imam Ghalib Alhinai, Talib Alhinai, the brother of the Imam and the Wali (governor) of Rustaq, and Suleiman bin Hamyar, who was the Wali (governor) of Jebel Akhdar, defended the Imamate in the Jebel Akhdar War against British-backed attacks by the Sultanate. In July 1957, the Sultan's forces were withdrawing, but they were repeatedly ambushed, sustaining heavy casualties. Sultan Said, however, with the intervention of British infantry (two companies of the Cameronians), armoured car detachments from the British Army and RAF aircraft, was able to suppress the rebellion. The Imamate's forces retreated to the inaccessible Jebel Akhdar.

Colonel David Smiley, who had been seconded to organise the Sultan's Armed Forces, managed to isolate the mountain in autumn 1958 and found a route to the plateau from Wadi Bani Kharus. On 4 August 1957, the British Foreign Secretary gave the approval to carry out air strikes without prior warning to the locals residing in the interior of Oman. Between July and December 1958, the British RAF made 1,635 raids, dropping 1,094 tons and firing 900 rockets at the interior of Oman targeting insurgents, mountain top villages, water channels and crops. On 27 January 1959, the Sultanate's forces occupied the mountain in a surprise operation. Imam Ghalib, his brother Talib and Sulaiman managed to escape to Saudi Arabia, where the Imamate's cause was promoted until the 1970s. The exiled partisans of the now abolished Imamate of Oman presented the case of Oman to the Arab League and the United Nations. On 11 December 1963, the UN General Assembly decided to establish an Ad-Hoc Committee on Oman to study the 'Question of Oman' and report back to the General Assembly. The UN General Assembly adopted the 'Question of Oman' resolution in 1965, 1966 and again in 1967 that called upon the British government to cease all repressive action against the locals, end British control over Oman and reaffirmed the inalienable right of the Omani people to self-determination and independence.

==== Dhofar War ====
In the Dhofar War, which began in 1963, pro-Soviet forces were pitted against government troops. As the rebellion threatened the Sultan's control of Dhofar, Sultan Said bin Taimur was deposed in a bloodless coup in 1970 by his son Qaboos bin Said with British support. Qaboos expanded the Sultan of Oman's Armed Forces, modernised the state's administration and introduced social reforms. The uprising was finally put down in 1976 with the help of forces from Jordan, Saudi Arabia, Iran, Pakistan and Britain.

=== Contemporary history (1970–present) ===
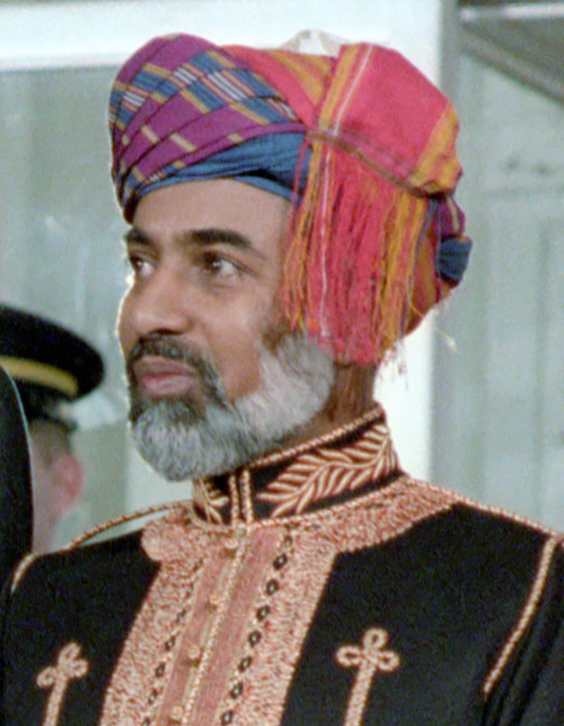
Sultan Qaboos bin Said, whose reign saw a rise in living standards and development, the abolition of slavery, the end of the Dhofar Rebellion, and the promulgation of Oman's constitution.

After deposing his father in 1970, Sultan Qaboos opened up the country, removed "Muscat and" from the country's name, embarked on economic reforms, and followed a policy of modernisation marked by increased spending on health, education and welfare, marking the beginning of the Omani Renaissance. Saudi Arabia invested in the development of the Omani education system, sending Saudi teachers on its own expense. Slavery, once a cornerstone of the country's trade and development, was outlawed in 1970.

In 1971, Oman joined the United Nations, along with Bahrain, Qatar and the United Arab Emirates.

In 1981, Oman became a founding member of the six-nation Gulf Cooperation Council. Political reforms were eventually introduced. The country adopted its present national flag in 1995, resembling the previous flag but with a thicker stripe. In 1997, a royal decree was issued granting women the right to vote, and stand for election to the Majlis al-Shura, the Consultative Assembly of Oman. Two women were duly elected to the body. In 2002, voting rights were extended to all citizens over the age of 21, and the first elections to the Consultative Assembly under the new rules were held in 2003. In 2004, the Sultan appointed Oman's first female minister with portfolio, Sheikha Aisha bint Khalfan bin Jameel al-Sayabiyah, to the post of National Authority for Industrial Craftsmanship. Despite these changes, there was little change to the actual political makeup of the government. The Sultan continued to rule by decree. Nearly 100 suspected Islamists were arrested in 2005 and 31 people were convicted of trying to overthrow the government. They were ultimately pardoned in June of the same year.

Before the Beijing Olympics, Oman became the stop of the Middle East's torch relay on 14 April 2008, covering 20 kilometres.

Inspired by the Arab Spring uprisings that were taking place throughout the region, protests occurred in Oman during the early months of 2011. While they did not call for the ousting of the regime, demonstrators demanded political reforms, improved living conditions and the creation of more jobs. They were dispersed by riot police in February 2011. Sultan Qaboos reacted by promising jobs and benefits. In October 2011, elections were held to the Consultative Assembly, to which Sultan Qaboos promised greater powers. The following year, the government began a crackdown on internet criticism. In September 2012, trials began of 'activists' accused of posting "abusive and provocative" criticism of the government online. Six were given jail terms.

In 2013, Oman achieved its status as the elimination of malaria diagnoses, according to the World Health Organisation (WHO).

Qaboos, at the time the Arab world's longest-serving ruler, died on 10 January 2020. He was succeeded by his first cousin Haitham bin Tariq. On 12 January 2021, Haitham named his eldest son, Theyazin bin Haitham, as the country's first crown prince and heir to the throne with an amendment to the Basic Statute.

== Geography ==
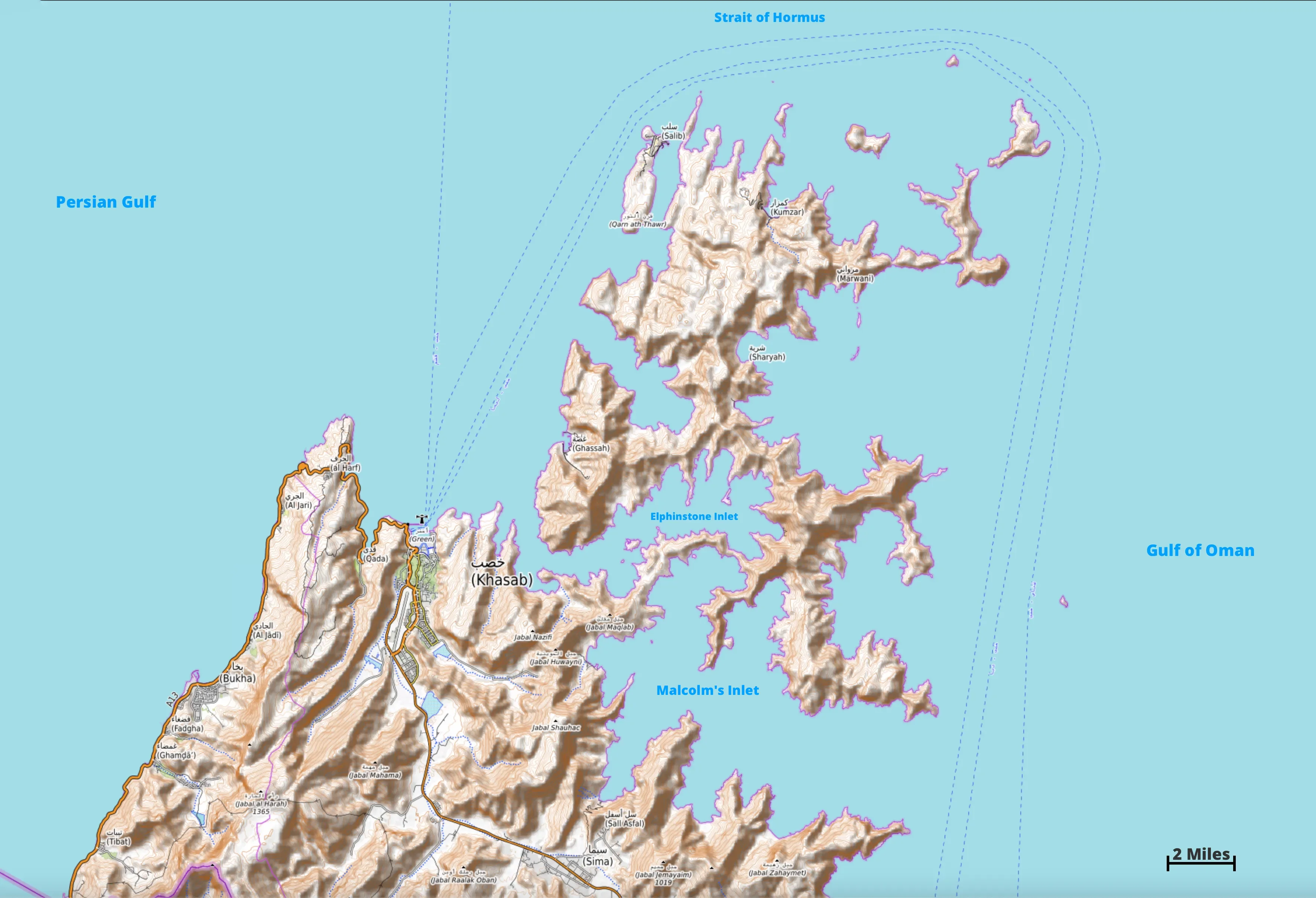
Topographic map of the Musandam Peninsula, near the Strait of Hormuz, and showing the Elphinstone Inlet and Malcolm's Inlet

Oman lies between latitudes 16th parallel north and 28th parallel north, and longitudes 52nd meridian east and 60th meridian east. A gravel desert plain covers most of central Oman, with mountain ranges along the north (Hajar Mountains) and southeast coast (Dhofar Mountains), where the country's main cities are located: the capital city Muscat, Sohar and Sur in the north, and Salalah in the south and Musandam. Oman's climate is hot and dry in the interior and humid along the coast.

The peninsula of Musandam (Musandem), strategically located on the Strait of Hormuz, is an exclave separated from the rest of Oman by the United Arab Emirates.

Madha, another exclave, is an enclave within UAE territory located halfway between the Musandam Peninsula and the main body of Oman. Madha, part of the Musandam governorate, covers approximately 75 square kilometres (29 sq mi). Madha's boundary was settled in 1969, with the north-east corner of Madha barely 10 metres (33 ft) from the Fujairah road. Within the Madha exclave is a UAE enclave called Nahwa, belonging to the Emirate of Sharjah, situated about 8 kilometres (5.0 mi) west of the town of New Madha, and consisting of about forty houses with a clinic and telephone exchange.

The central desert of Oman is a source of meteorites for scientific analysis.

=== Climate ===
Like the rest of the Persian Gulf, Oman generally has one of the hottest climates in the world—with summer temperatures in Muscat and northern Oman averaging 30 to 40 °C (86.0 to 104.0 °F). Oman receives little rainfall, with annual rainfall in Muscat averaging 100 mm (3.9 in), occurring mostly in January. In the south, the Dhofar Mountains area near Salalah has a tropical-like climate and receives seasonal rainfall from late June to late September as a result of monsoon winds from the Indian Ocean, leaving the summer air saturated with cool moisture and heavy fog. Summer temperatures in Salalah range from 20 to 30 °C (68.0 to 86.0 °F)—relatively cool compared to northern Oman.

The mountain areas receive more rainfall, and annual rainfall on the higher parts of the Jabal Akhdar probably exceeds 400 millimetres (16 in). Low temperatures in the mountainous areas leads to snow cover once every few years. Some parts of the coast, particularly near the island of Masirah, sometimes receive no rain at all within the course of a year. The climate is generally very hot, with temperatures reaching around 54 °C (129.2 °F) (peak) in the hot season, from May to September.

On 26 June 2018, the village of Qurayyat set the record for highest minimum temperature in a 24-hour period, 42.6 °C (108.7 °F).

In terms of climate action, major challenges remain to be solved, per the United Nations Sustainable Development 2019 index. The per-capita CO_{2} emissions from energy and embodied in fossil fuel exports rates are very high, while imported CO_{2} emissions and percent of population affected by climate-related disasters are low.

==== Wadis ====
Oman possesses many wadis (Arabic term for river valley) that can temporarily fill with water when rain occurs.

=== Biodiversity ===
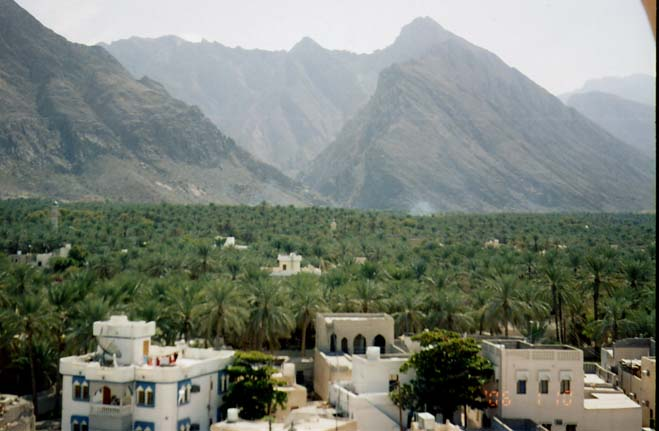
Nakhal palm tree farms in Oman's Al Batinah Region

Desert shrub and desert grass, common in southern Arabia, are found in Oman, but vegetation is sparse in the interior plateau, which is largely gravel desert. The greater monsoon rainfall in Dhofar and the mountains makes the growth there more luxuriant during summer; coconut palms grow plentifully on the coastal plains of Dhofar and frankincense is produced in the hills, with abundant oleander and varieties of acacia. The Hajar Mountains are a distinct ecoregion, the highest points in eastern Arabia, with wildlife that includes the Arabian tahr.

Indigenous mammals include the Arabian leopard, striped hyena, fox, Arabian wolf, Cape hare, Arabian oryx and Nubian ibex. Birds include the vulture, eagle, stork, bustard, Arabian partridge, bee eater, falcon and sunbird. In 2001, Oman had nine endangered species of mammals, five endangered types of birds, and nineteen threatened plant species. Decrees have been passed to protect endangered species, including the Arabian leopard, Arabian oryx, mountain gazelle, goitered gazelle, Arabian tahr, green sea turtle, hawksbill turtle and olive ridley turtle. However, the Arabian Oryx Sanctuary is the first site ever to be deleted from UNESCO's World Heritage List, following the government's 2007 decision to reduce the site's area by 90% to clear the way for oil prospectors.

Local and national entities have noted unethical treatment of animals in Oman. In particular, stray dogs (and to a lesser extent, stray cats) are often the victims of torture, abuse or neglect. The only approved method of decreasing the stray dog population is shooting by police officers. The Oman government has refused to implement a spay and neuter programme or create any animal shelters in the country. Cats, while seen as more acceptable than dogs, are nevertheless also viewed as pests and frequently die of starvation or illness.

In recent years, Oman has become a popular spot for whale watching, highlighting the critically endangered Arabian humpback whale, sperm whales and pygmy blue whales.

== Politics ==
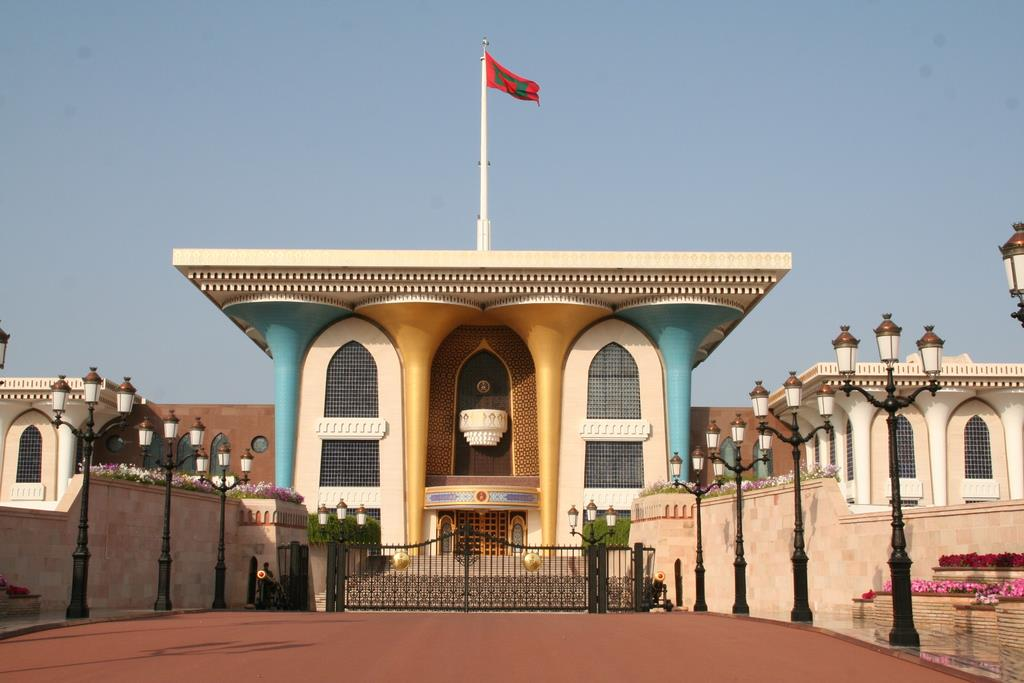
The Sultan's Al Alam Palace in Old Muscat

Oman is a unitary state and an absolute monarchy, in which all legislative, executive and judiciary power ultimately rests in the hands of the hereditary Sultan. Consequently, Freedom House has routinely rated the country "Not Free".

The sultan is the head of state and directly controls the foreign affairs and defence portfolios. He has absolute power and issues laws by decree.

According to International IDEA's Global State of Democracy (GSoD) Indices and Democracy Tracker, Oman performs in the low to mid-range on overall democratic measures, with particular weaknesses in political participation, including electoral participation and civil society.

=== Legal system ===
Oman is an absolute monarchy, with the Sultan's word having the force of law. The judiciary branch is subordinate to the Sultan. According to Oman's constitution, Sharia law is one of the sources of legislation. Sharia court departments within the civil court system are responsible for family-law matters, such as divorce and inheritance.

While ultimate power is concentrated in the Sultan and Oman does not have an official separation of powers, the late Sultan Qaboos declined to grant the full title Minister of Defence, Minister of Foreign Affairs and Minister of Finance to the ministers exercising those responsibilities, preferring to keep them within the Royal Domain. The current Sultan Haitham has granted the ministers responsible of those portfolios the full titles, whilst elevating the defence portfolio to that of a deputy prime minister. Since 1970 all legislation has been promulgated through royal decrees, including the 1996 Basic Law. The Sultan appoints the ministers, the judges, and can grant pardons and commute sentences. The Sultan's authority is inviolable and the Sultan expects total subordination to his will.

The administration of justice is highly personalised, with limited due process protections, especially in political and security-related cases. The Basic Statute of the State is supposedly the cornerstone of the Omani legal system and it operates as a constitution for the country. The Basic Statute was issued in 1996 and thus far has been amended only twice: in 2011, in response to protests; and in 2021, to create the position of Crown Prince of Oman.

Though Oman's legal code theoretically protects civil liberties and personal freedoms, both are regularly ignored by the regime. Women and children face legal discrimination in many areas. Women are excluded from certain state benefits, such as housing loans, and are refused equal rights under the personal status law. Women also experience restrictions on their self-determination in respect to health and reproductive rights.

The Omani legislature is the bicameral Council of Oman, consisting of an upper chamber, the Council of State (Majlis ad-Dawlah) and a lower chamber, the Consultative Assembly (Majlis al-Shura). Political parties are banned, as are any affiliations based on religion. The upper chamber has 71 members, appointed by the Sultan from among prominent Omanis; it has only advisory powers. The 84 members of the Consultative Assembly are elected by universal suffrage to serve four-year terms. The members are appointed for three-year terms, which may be renewed once. The last elections were held on 29 October 2023, and the next is due in October 2027. Oman's national anthem, As-Salam as-Sultani is dedicated to former Sultan Qaboos.

=== Administrative divisions ===
The Sultanate of Oman is administratively divided into 11 governorates (Arabic: محافظات). The governorates are further divided into 63 provinces (Arabic: ولايات).

Governorate	Capital
Ad Dakhiliyah Governorate	Nizwa
Ad Dhahirah Governorate	Ibri
Al Batinah North Governorate	Sohar
Al Batinah South Governorate	Rustaq
Al Buraimi Governorate	Al Buraimi
Al Wusta Governorate	Haima
Ash Sharqiyah North Governorate	Ibra
Ash Sharqiyah South Governorate	Sur
Dhofar Governorate	Salalah
Muscat Governorate	Muscat
Musandam Governorate	Khasab

=== Foreign relations ===
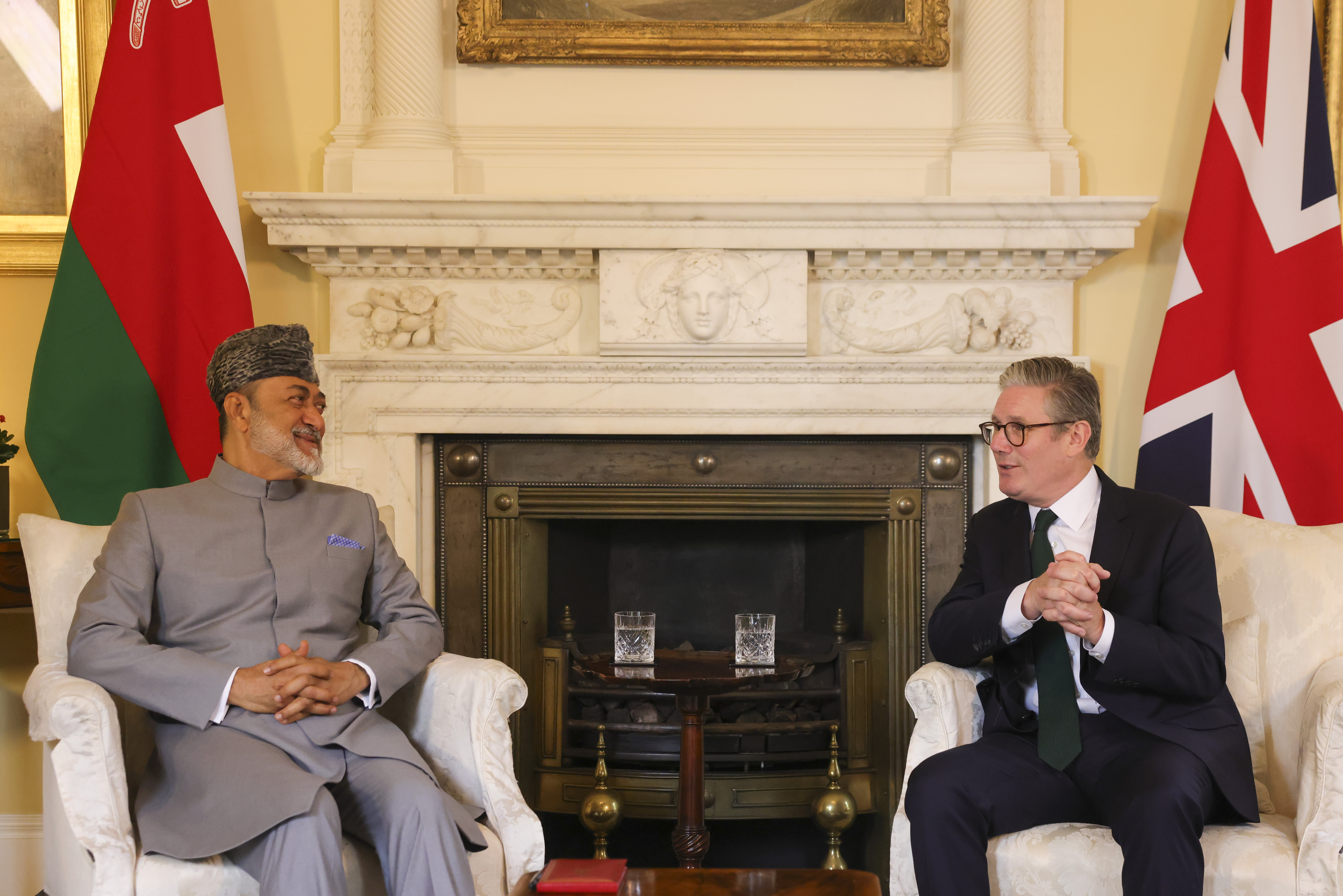
Sultan Haitham bin Tariq with British Prime Minister Keir Starmer, August 2024

Since 1970, Oman has pursued a moderate foreign policy, and has expanded its diplomatic relations dramatically. Oman is among the very few Arab countries that have maintained friendly ties with Iran. Badr bin Hamad Al Busaidi is the Sultanate's Minister of Foreign Affairs.

Oman allowed the British Royal Navy and Indian Navy access to the port facilities of Al Duqm Port & Drydock.

=== Military ===
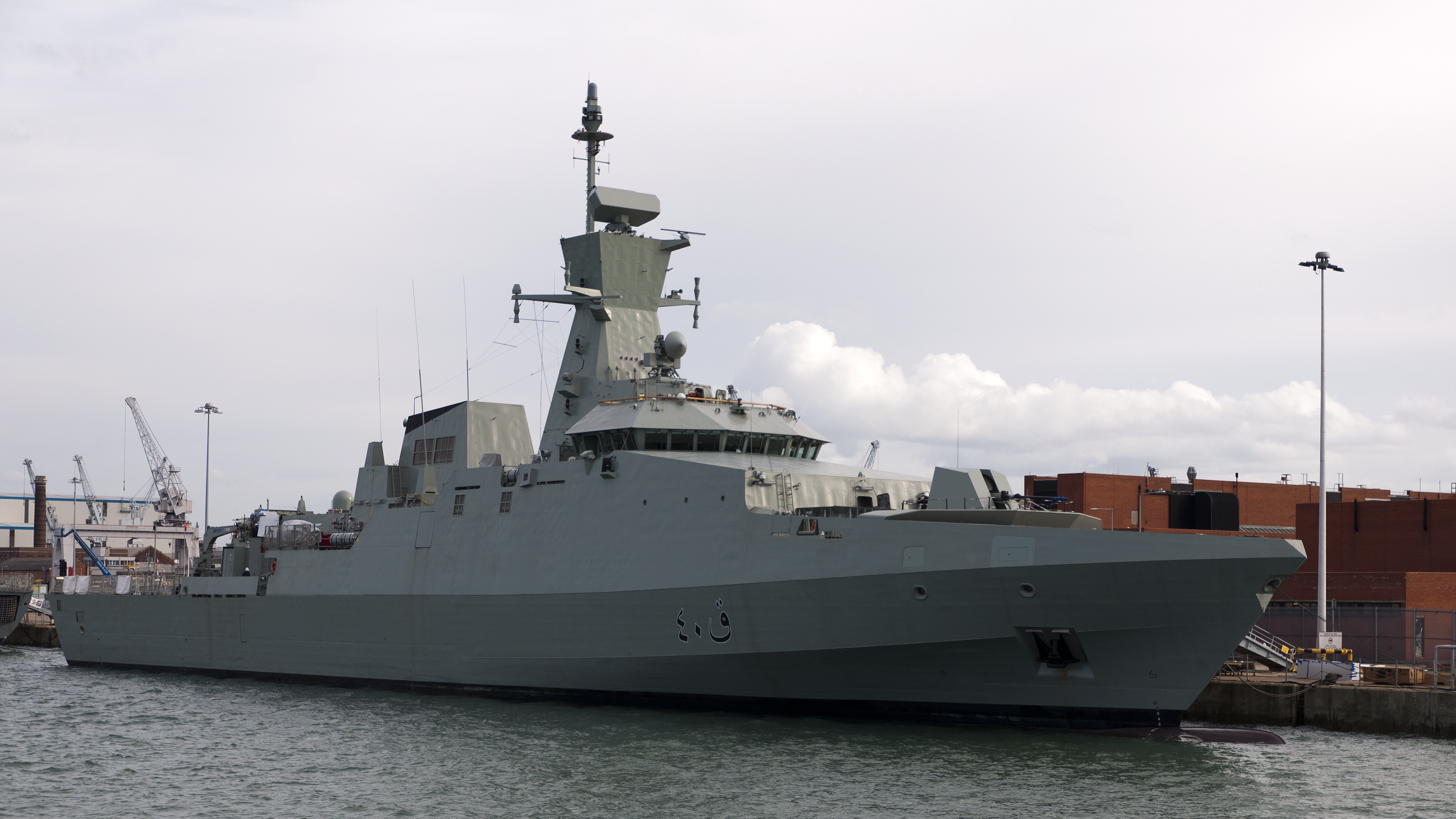
Royal Navy of Oman Khareef-class corvette, Al-Shamikh

SIPRI's estimation of Oman's military and security expenditure as a percentage of GDP in 2020 was 11 percent, making it the world's highest rate in that year, higher than Saudi Arabia (8.4 percent). Oman's on-average military spending as a percentage of GDP between 2016 and 2018 was around 10 percent, while the world's average during the same period was 2.2 percent.

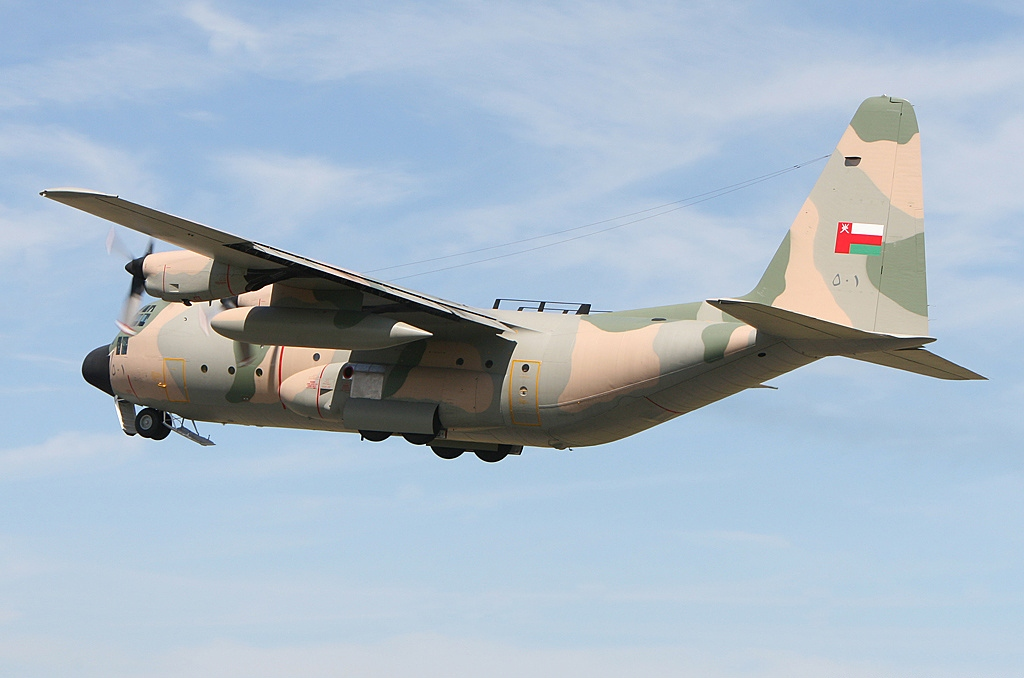
Lockheed C-130H Hercules of the Royal Air Force of Oman

Oman's military manpower totalled 44,100 in 2006, including 25,000 men in the army, 4,200 sailors in the navy, and an air force with 4,100 personnel. The Royal Household maintained 5,000 Guards, 1,000 in Special Forces, 150 sailors in the Royal Yacht fleet, and 250 pilots and ground personnel in the Royal Flight squadrons. Oman also maintains a modestly sized paramilitary force of 4,400 men.

The Royal Army of Oman had 25,000 active personnel in 2006, plus a small contingent of Royal Household troops. Despite a comparative large military spending, it has been relatively slow to modernise its forces. Oman has a relatively limited number of tanks, including 6 M60A1, 73 M60A3 and 38 Challenger 2 main battle tanks, as well as 37 aging Scorpion light tanks.

The Royal Air Force of Oman has approximately 4,100 men, with 36 combat aircraft and no armed helicopters. Combat aircraft include 20 aging Jaguars, 12 Hawk Mk 203s, 4 Hawk Mk 103s and 12 PC-9 turboprop trainers with a limited combat capability. It has one squadron of 12 F-16C/D aircraft. Oman also has 4 A202-18 Bravos and 8 MFI-17B Mushshaqs.

The Royal Navy of Oman had 4,200 men in 2000, and is headquartered at Seeb. It has bases at Ahwi, Ghanam Island, Mussandam and Salalah. In 2006, Oman had ten surface combat vessels. These included two 1,450-ton Qahir class corvettes, and eight ocean-going patrol boats. The Omani Navy had one 2,500-ton Nasr al Bahr class LSL (240 troops, 7 tanks) with a helicopter deck. Oman also had at least four landing craft. Oman ordered three Khareef class corvettes from the VT Group for £400 million in 2007. They were built at Portsmouth. In 2010 Oman spent US$4.074 billion on military expenditures, 8.5% of the gross domestic product. The sultanate has a long history of association with the British military and defence industry. According to SIPRI, Oman was the 23rd largest arms importer from 2012 to 2016.

=== Human rights ===
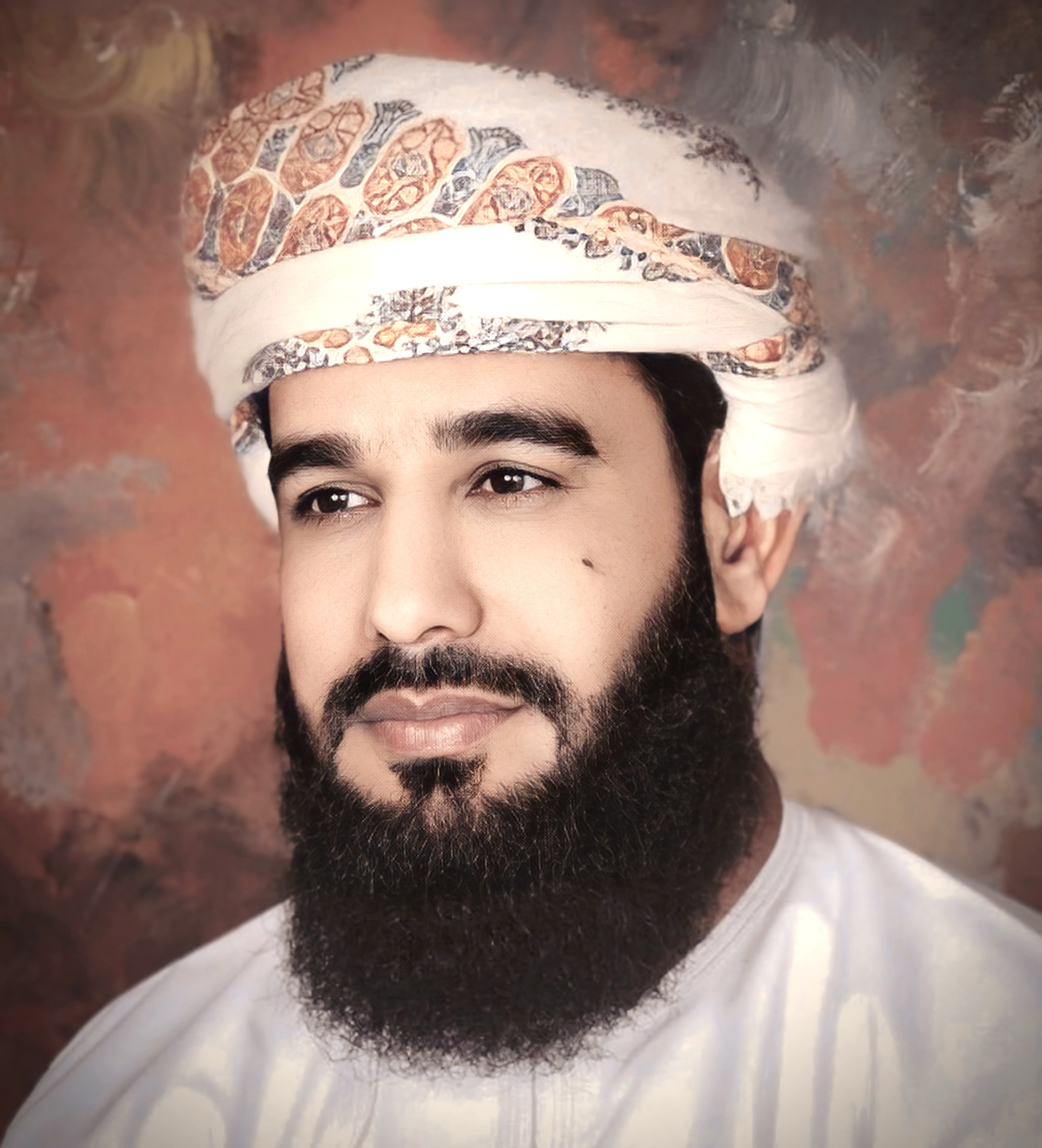
Talib Al Mamari, a former member of the Consultative Assembly of Oman, who was arrested in 2013 after participating in a peaceful protest as a mediator. The UN Working Group on Arbitrary Detention (WGAD) deemed his detention arbitrary and a violation of his right to freedom of expression.

Torture methods in use in Oman include mock execution, beating, hooding, solitary confinement, subjection to extremes of temperature and to constant noise, abuse and humiliation. There have been numerous reports of torture and other inhumane forms of punishment perpetrated by Omani security forces on protesters and detainees. Several prisoners detained in 2012 complained of sleep deprivation, extreme temperatures and solitary confinement. Homosexuality is criminalised within Oman.

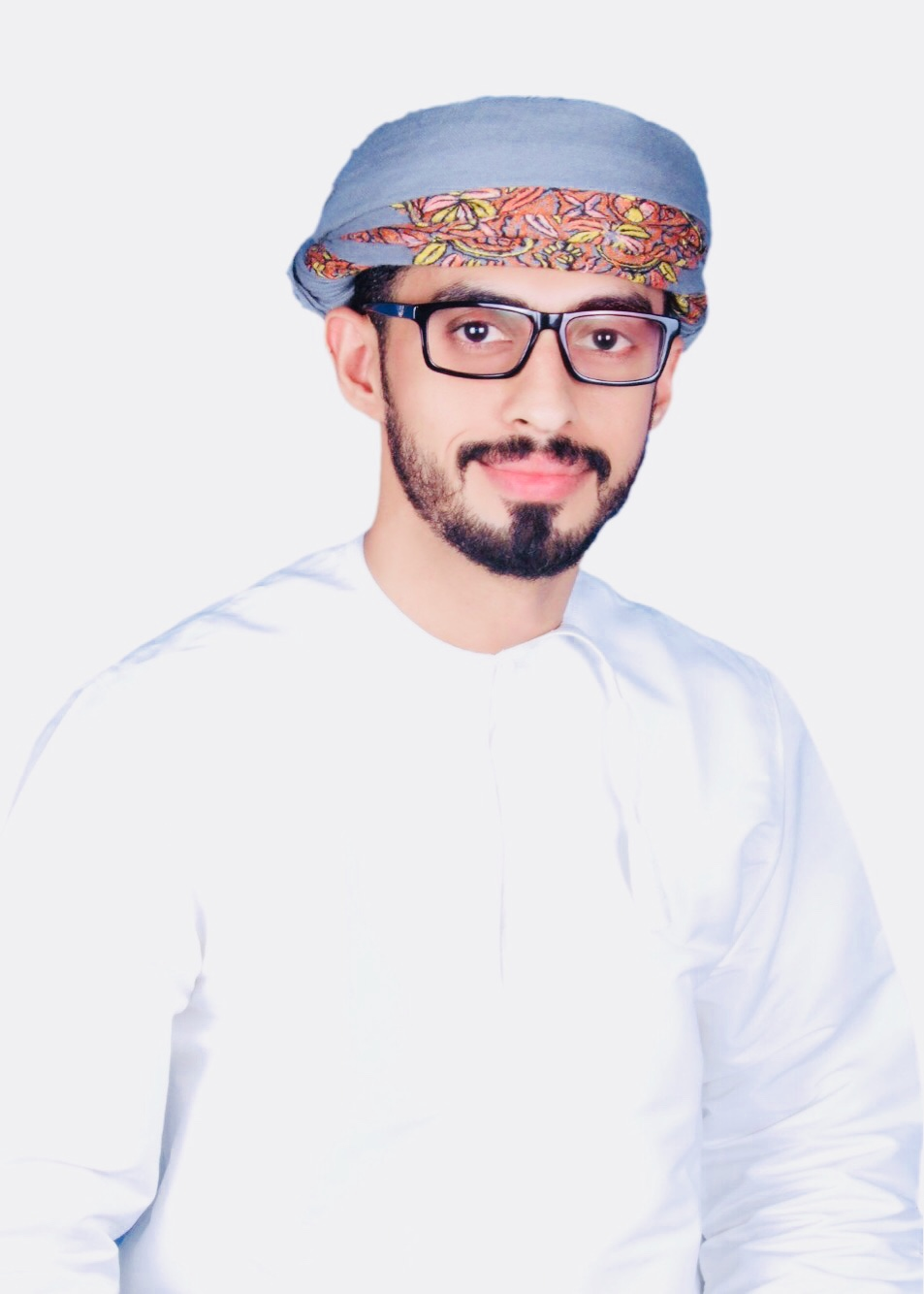
Mohammed Al-Fazari, an exiled Omani writer and journalist now living in the UK, is an author whose books are banned in Oman. He is also the founder and EIC of Muwatin.

The Omani government decides who can or cannot be a journalist and this permission can be withdrawn at any time. Censorship and self-censorship are a constant factor. Omanis have limited access to political information through the media. Access to news and information can be problematic: journalists have to be content with news compiled by the official news agency on some issues. Through a decree by the Sultan, the government has now extended its control over the media to blogs and other websites. Omanis cannot hold a public meeting without the government's approval. Omanis who want to set up a non-governmental organisation of any kind need a licence. The Omani government does not permit the formation of independent civil society associations. Human Rights Watch issued in 2016, that an Omani court sentenced three journalists to prison and ordered the permanent closure of their newspaper, over an article that alleged corruption in the judiciary.

Omani law prohibits criticism of the Sultan and government in any form or medium. Oman's police do not need search warrants to enter people's homes. The law does not provide citizens with the right to change their government. The Sultan retains ultimate authority on all foreign and domestic issues. Government officials are not subject to financial disclosure laws. Criticism of government figures and politically objectionable views have been suppressed. Publication of books is limited and the government restricts their importation and distribution, as with other media products.

Until 2023, Omani citizens needed government permission to marry foreigners. In April 2023, the law was changed by a royal decree, allowing Omani citizens to marry foreigners without government permission. According to HRW, women in Oman face discrimination.

The plight of domestic workers in Oman is a taboo subject. In 2011, the Philippines government determined that out of all the countries in the Middle East, only Oman and Israel qualify as safe for Filipino migrants. Migrant workers remained insufficiently protected against exploitation.

== Economy ==
Historical development of real GDP per capita in Oman

Oman's Basic Statute of the State expresses in Article 11 that the "national economy is based on justice and the principles of a free economy". By regional standards, Oman has a relatively diversified economy, but remains dependent on oil exports. In terms of monetary value, mineral fuels accounted for 82.2 percent of total product exports in 2018. Tourism is the fastest-growing industry in Oman. Other sources of income, agriculture and industry, are small in comparison and account for less than 1% of the country's exports, but diversification is seen as a priority by the government. Agriculture, often subsistence in its character, produces dates, limes, grains and vegetables, but with less than 1% of the country under cultivation, Oman is likely to remain a net importer of food.

Oman's socio-economic structure is described as being hyper-centralised rentier welfare state. The largest 10 percent of corporations in Oman are the employers of almost 80 percent of Omani nationals in the private sector. Half of the private sector jobs are classified as elementary. One third of employed Omanis are in the private sector, while the remaining majority are in the public sector. A hyper-centralised structure produces a monopoly-like economy.

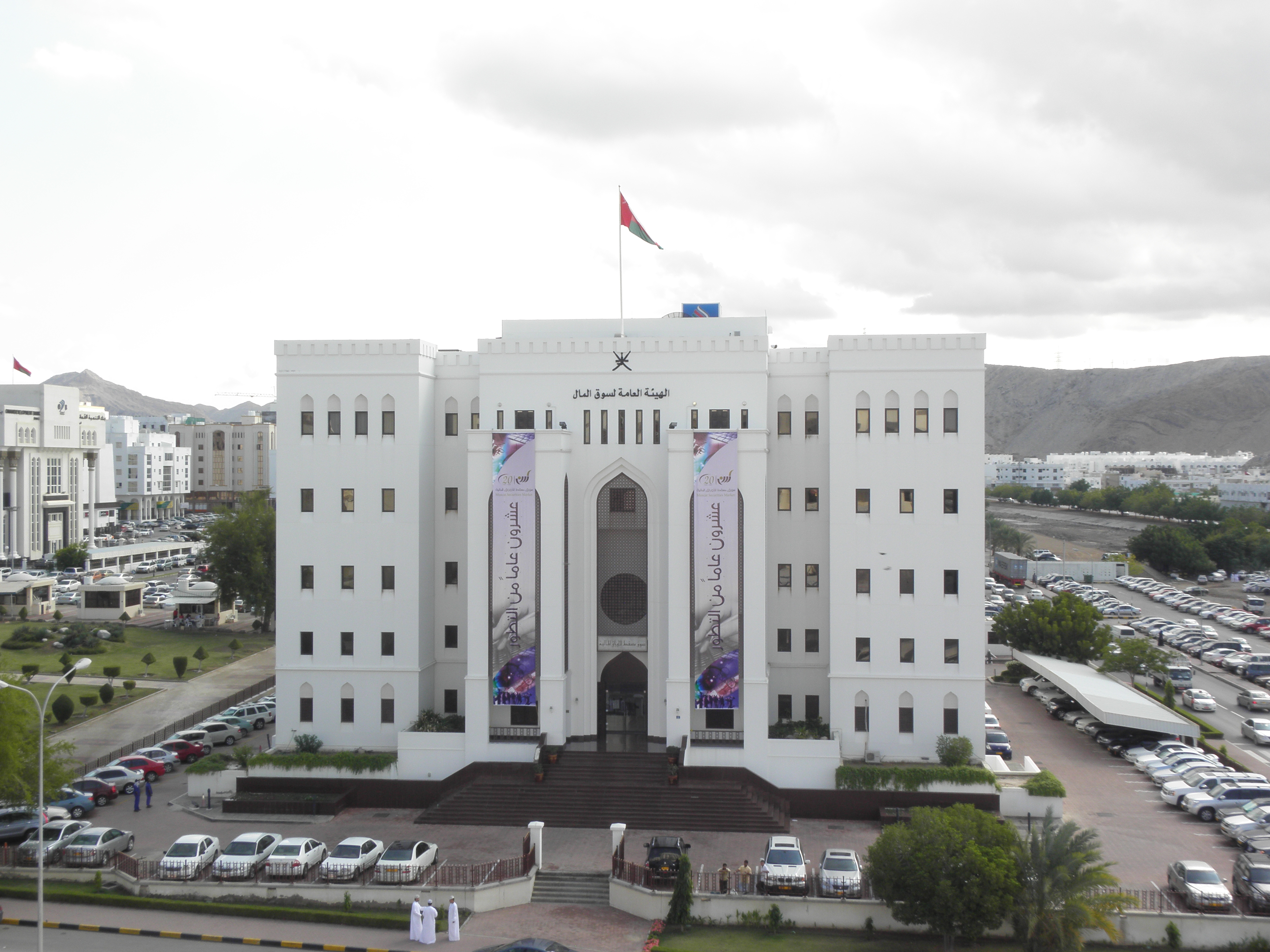
Muscat Securities Market

Since a slump in oil prices in 1998, Oman has made active plans to diversify its economy and is placing a greater emphasis on other areas of industry, namely tourism and infrastructure. Oman had a 2020 Vision to diversify the economy established in 1995, which targeted a decrease in oil's share to less than 10 percent of GDP by 2020, but it was rendered obsolete in 2011. Oman then established 2040 Vision. A free-trade agreement with the United States took effect 1 January 2009, which eliminated tariff barriers on all consumer and industrial products and provided strong protections for foreign businesses investing in Oman. Tourism, another source of Oman's revenue, is on the rise.

Foreign Direct Investment (FDI) in Oman by country as of 2017
1. United Kingdom (48.0%)
2. United Arab Emirates (10.8%)
3. Kuwait (4.60%)
4. Other (36.6%)

Oman's foreign workers send an estimated US$10 billion annually to their home states in Asia and Africa, more than half of them earning a monthly wage of less than US$400. The largest foreign community is from the Indian states of Kerala, Tamil Nadu, Karnataka, Maharashtra, Gujarat and Punjab, representing more than half of the entire workforce in Oman. Salaries for overseas workers are known to be less than those for Omani nationals, though still two to five times higher than for the equivalent job in India.

In terms of foreign direct investment (FDI), total investments in 2017 exceeded US$24 billion. The highest share of FDI went to the oil and gas sector, which represented around US$13 billion (54.2 percent), followed by financial intermediation, which represented US$3.66 billion (15.3 percent). FDI is dominated by the United Kingdom with an estimated value of US$11.56 billion (48 percent), followed by the UAE, with US$2.6 billion (10.8 percent), and Kuwait with US$1.1 billion (4.6 percent).

In 2018, Oman had a budget deficit of 32 percent of total revenue and a government debt-to-GDP ratio of 47.5 percent. Oman's military spending to GDP between 2016 and 2018 averaged 10 percent, while the world's average during the same period was 2.2 percent. Oman's health spending to GDP in 2015 and 2016 averaged 4.3 percent, while the world's average during the same period was 10 percent. Oman's research and development spending between 2016 and 2017 averaged 0.24 percent, which is significantly lower than the world's average (2.2 percent) during the same period. Oman's government spending on education to GDP in 2016 was 6.11 percent, while the world's average was 4.8 percent (2015).

Oman's Spending in 2016
Type	Spending (% of GDP)
Military spending	13.73
Education spending	6.11
Health spending	4.30
Research & Development spending	0.26

=== Oil and gas ===
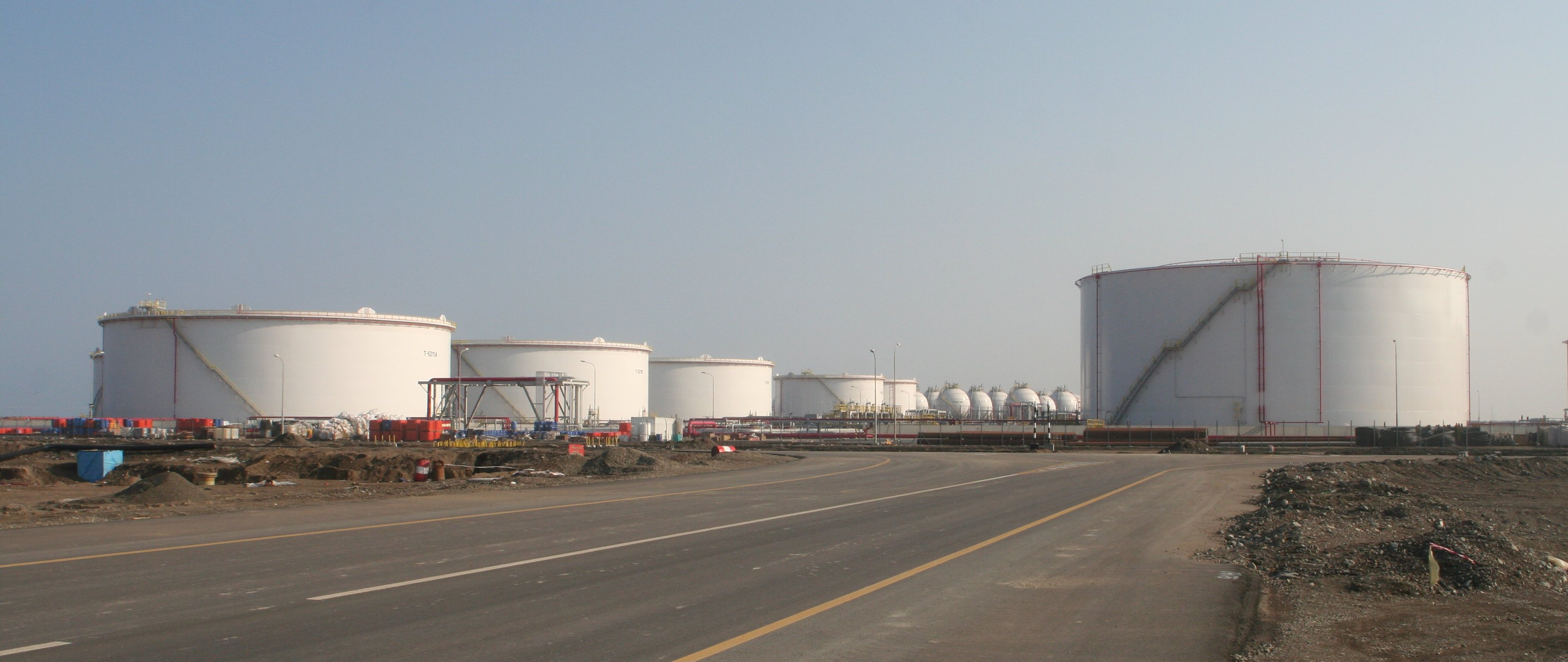
Petrochemical tanks in Sohar

Oman's proven reserves of petroleum total about 5.5 billion barrels, 25th largest in the world. Oil is extracted and processed by Petroleum Development Oman (PDO), with proven oil reserves holding approximately steady, although oil production has been declining. The Ministry of Energy and Minerals is responsible for all oil and gas infrastructure and projects in Oman. Following the 1970s energy crisis, Oman doubled their oil output between 1979 and 1985.

In 2018, oil and gas represented 71 percent of the government's revenues. In 2016, oil and gas share of the government's revenue represented 72 percent. The government's reliance on oil and gas as a source of income dropped by 1 percent from 2016 to 2018. Oil and gas sector represented 30.1 percent of the nominal GDP in 2017.

Between 2000 and 2007, production fell by more than 26%, from 972,000 to 714,800 barrels per day. Production has recovered to 816,000 barrels in 2009, and 930,000 barrels per day in 2012. Oman's natural gas reserves are estimated at 849.5 billion cubic metres, ranking 28th in the world, and production in 2008 was about 24 billion cubic metres per year.

In September 2019, Oman was confirmed to become the first Middle Eastern country to host the International Gas Union Research Conference (IGRC 2020). This 16th iteration of the event was held between 24 and 26 February 2020, in collaboration with Oman LNG, under the auspices of the Ministry of Energy and Minerals.

=== Industry, innovation and infrastructure ===
In industry, innovation and infrastructure, Oman is still faced with "significant challenges", as per United Nations Sustainable Development Goals index, as of 2019. Oman has scored high on the rates of internet use, mobile broadband subscriptions, logistics performance and on the average of top 3 university rankings. Meanwhile, Oman scored low on the rate of scientific and technical publications and on research & development spending. Oman's manufacturing value added to GDP rate in 2016 was 8.4 percent, which is lower than the average in the Arab world (9.8 percent) and world average (15.6 percent). In terms of research & development expenditures to GDP, Oman's share was on average 0.20 percent between 2011 and 2015, while the world's average during the same period was 2.11 percent. The majority of firms in Oman operate in the oil and gas, construction and trade sectors.

Non-hydrocarbon GDP growth	2015	2016	2017	2018
Value (%)	4.8	6.2	0.5	1.5

Oman is refurbishing and expanding the ports infrastructure in Muscat, Duqm, Sohar and Salalah to expand tourism, local production and export shares. Oman is also expanding its downstream operations by constructing a refinery and petrochemical plant in Duqm with a 230,000 barrels per day capacity projected for completion by 2021. The majority of industrial activity in Oman takes place in eight industrial states and four free-zones. The industrial activity is mainly focused on mining-and-services, petrochemicals and construction materials. The largest employers in the private-sector are the construction, wholesale-and-retail and manufacturing sectors, respectively. Construction accounts for nearly 48 percent of the total labour force, followed by wholesale-and-retail, which accounts for around 15 percent of total employment and manufacturing, which accounts for around 12 percent of employment in the private sector. The percentage of Omanis employed in the construction and manufacturing sectors is nevertheless low, as of 2011 statistics.

Oman, as per Global Innovation Index (2019) report, scores "below expectations" in innovation relative to countries classified under high income. In 2025, Oman ranked 69th out of 144 countries in innovation index, which takes into consideration factors, such as, political environment, education, infrastructure and business sophistication. Innovation, technology-based growth and economic diversification are hindered by an economic growth that relies on infrastructure expansion, which heavily depends on a high percentage of 'low-skilled' and 'low-wage' foreign labour. Another challenge to innovation is the Dutch disease phenomenon, which creates an oil and gas investment lock-in, while relying heavily on imported products and services in other sectors. Such a locked-in system hinders local business growth and global competitiveness in other sectors, and thus impedes economic diversification. The inefficiencies and bottlenecks in business operations that are a result of heavy dependence on natural resources and 'addiction' to imports in Oman suggest a 'factor-driven economy'. A third hindrance to innovation in Oman is an economic structure that is heavily dependent on few large firms, while granting few opportunities for SMEs to enter the market, which impedes healthy market-share competition between firms. The ratio of patent applications per million people was 0.35 in 2016 and the MENA region average was 1.50, while the 'high-income' countries' average was approximately 48.0 during the same year. Oman was ranked 74th in the Global Innovation Index in 2024.

=== Agriculture and fishing ===
Oman's fishing industry contributed 0.78 percent to the GDP in 2016. Fish exports between 2000 and 2016 grew from US$144 million to US$172 million, an increase of 19.4 percent. The main importer of Omani fish in 2016 was Vietnam, which imported almost US$80 million (46.5 percent) in value, and the second biggest importer was the United Arab Emirates, which imported around US$26 million (15 percent). The other main importers are Saudi Arabia, Brazil and China. Oman's consumption of fish is almost two times the world's average. The ratio of exported fish to total fish captured in tons fluctuated between 49 and 61 percent between 2006 and 2016. Omani strengths in the fishing industry comes from having a good market system, a long coastline (3,165 km) and wide water area. However, Oman lacks sufficient infrastructure, research and development, quality and safety monitoring, together with a limited contribution by the fishing industry to GDP.

Dates represent 80 percent of all fruit crop production. Further, date farms employ 50 percent of the total agricultural area in the country. Oman's estimated production of dates in 2016 is 350,000 tons, making it the 9th largest producer of dates. Oman's total export of dates was US$12.6 million in 2016, almost equivalent to Oman's total imported value of dates, which was US$11.3 million in 2016. The main importer is India (around 60 percent of all imports). Oman's date exports remained steady between 2006 and 2016. Oman is considered to have good infrastructure for date production and support provision to cultivation and marketing, but lacks innovation in farming and cultivation, industrial coordination in the supply chain and encounter high losses of unused dates.

=== Tourism ===
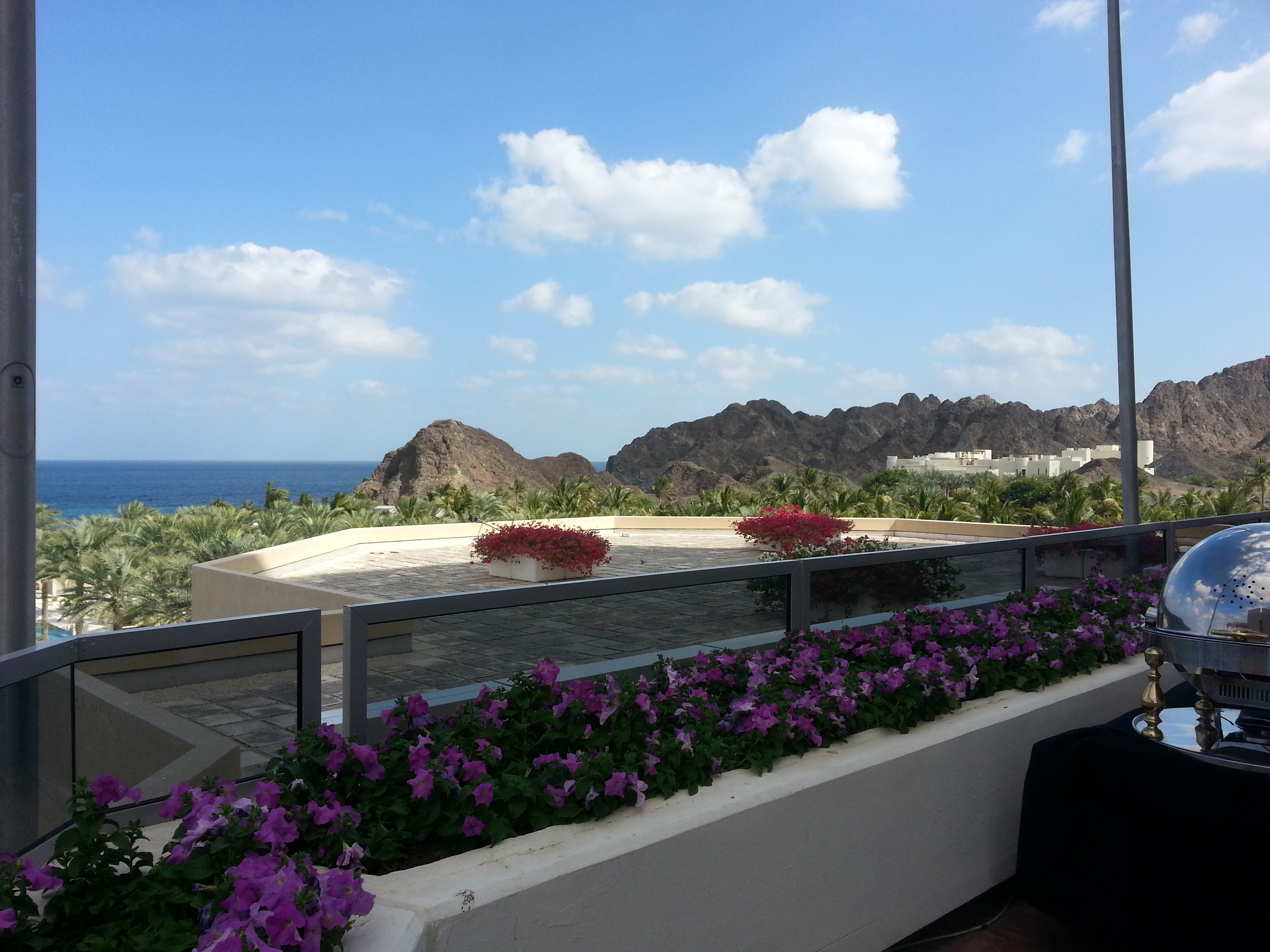
Al-Bustan Palace Hotel, Muscat

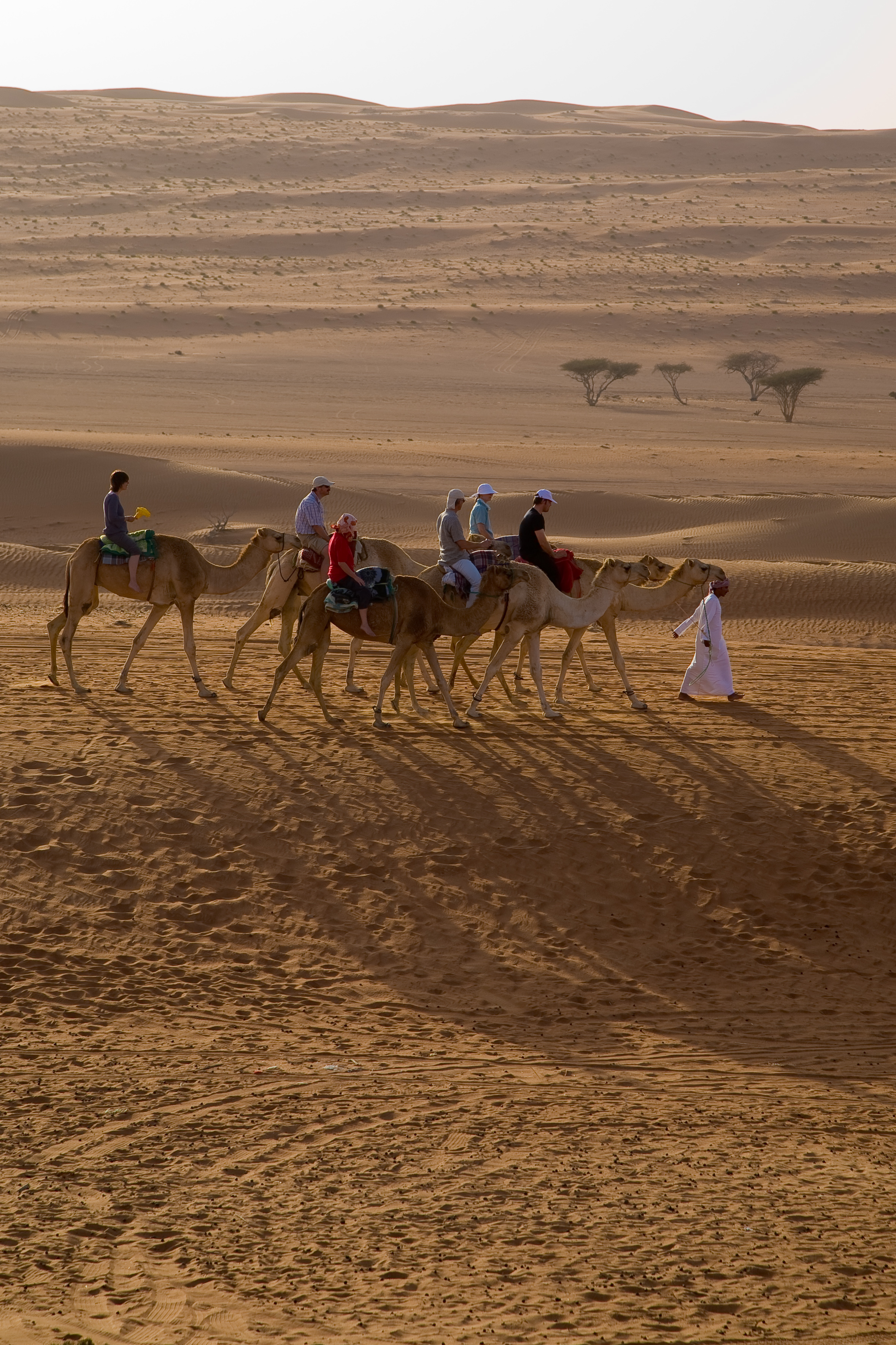
Sharqiya Sands

Tourism in Oman has grown considerably recently, and it is expected to be one of the largest industries in the country. The World Travel & Tourism Council stated that Oman is the fastest growing tourism destination in the Middle East.

Tourism contributed 2.8 percent to the Omani GDP in 2016. It grew from RO 505 million (US$1.3 billion) in 2009 to RO 719 million (US$1.8 billion) in 2017 (+42.3 percent growth). Citizens of the Gulf Cooperation Council (GCC), including Omanis who are residing outside of Oman, represent the highest ratio of all tourists visiting Oman, estimated to be 48 percent. The second highest number of visitors come from other Asian countries, who account for 17 percent of the total number of visitors. A challenge to tourism development in Oman is the reliance on the government-owned firm, Omran, as a key actor to develop the tourism sector, which potentially creates a market barrier-to-entry of private-sector actors and a crowding out effect. Another key issue to the tourism sector is deepening the understanding of the ecosystem and biodiversity in Oman to guarantee their protection and preservation.

Ecotourism is a growing segment of Omani tourism. One site in particular – Ras al-Jinz, also known as "Turtle Beach" – is a popular destination due to the annual nesting of the critically endangered Hawksbill Turtle, the endangered Green Turtle, the Olive Ridley Turtle, and the Loggerhead Turtle.

Oman has one of the most diverse environments in the Middle East with various tourist attractions and is particularly well known for adventure and cultural tourism. Muscat, the capital of Oman, was named the second best city to visit in the world in 2012 by the travel guide publisher Lonely Planet. Muscat also was chosen as the Capital of Arab Tourism of 2012.

In November 2019, Oman made the rule of visa on arrival an exception and introduced the concept of e-visa for tourists from all nationalities. Under the new laws, visitors were required to apply for the visa in advance.

== Demographics ==
Historical population
Year	Pop.	±% p.a.
1950	457,000	—
1960	537,000	+1.63%
1970	671,000	+2.25%
1980	1,017,000	+4.25%
1990	1,805,000	+5.90%
2000	2,344,000	+2.65%
2010	2,882,000	+2.09%
2015	4,192,000	+7.78%
2020	4,543,000	+1.62%
2023	4,644,384	+0.74%

By 2020, Oman's population exceeded 4.5 million. The total fertility rate in 2020 was estimated to be 2.8 children born per woman; this rate has been rapidly decreasing in recent years. About half of the population lives in Muscat and the Batinah coastal plain northwest of the capital. Omanis are entirely Arab, with certain groups of Baluchi and African descent. Around 20 percent of Omanis are of Baloch descent whose ancestors migrated to Oman centuries ago, and are now considered native.

Omani society is largely tribal and encompasses three major identities: that of the tribe, the Muslim faith and maritime trade. The first two identities are closely tied to tradition and are especially prevalent in the interior of the country, owing to lengthy periods of isolation. The third identity pertains mostly to Muscat and the coastal areas of Oman, and is reflected by business, trade, and the origins of certain Omanis, who trace their roots to the Baloch, al-Lawatia, a community from Sindh, Persia and historical Omani Zanzibar. Omanis of Balochi descent typically use the surname/nisba Al-Balushi. Gwadar, a region of Balochistan, was a colony of Oman for more than a century. In the 1960s, Pakistan took over the land, with many Omanis being still there.

=== Largest cities ===
Largest cities or towns in Oman "Oman – 10 Largest Cities". geonames.org.
Rank	Name	Governorate	Pop.
1	Muscat	Muscat Governorate	797,000
2	Seeb	Muscat Governorate	237,816
3	Salalah	Dhofar Governorate	163,140
4	Bawshar	Muscat Governorate	159,487
5	Sohar	Al Batinah North Governorate	108,274
6	Suwayq	Al Batinah North Governorate	107,143
7	Ibri	Al Dhahirah Governorate	101,640
8	Saham	Al Batinah North Governorate	89,327
9	Barka	Al Batinah South Governorate	81,647
10	Rustaq	Al Batinah South Governorate	79,383

=== Languages ===
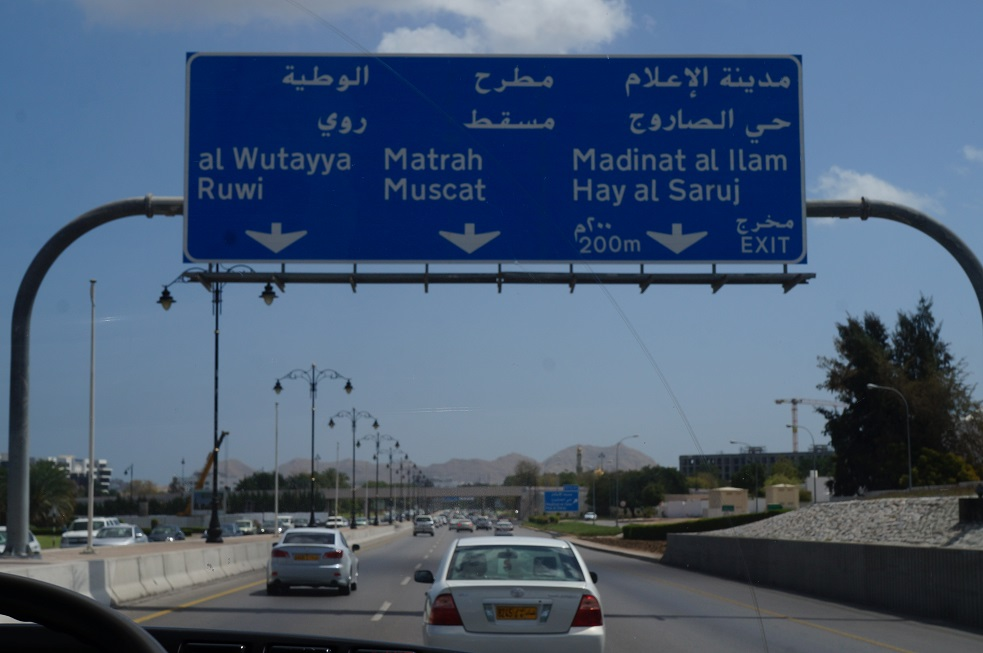
Arabic and English road sign in Oman

Arabic is the official and most widely spoken language of Oman. It belongs to the Semitic branch of the Afroasiatic family. There are several dialects of Arabic spoken, all part of the Peninsular Arabic family: Dhofari Arabic (also known as Dhofari, Zofari) is spoken in Salalah and the surrounding coastal regions (the Dhofar Governorate). Gulf Arabic is spoken in parts bordering the UAE; whereas Omani Arabic, distinct from the Gulf Arabic of eastern Arabia and Bahrain, is spoken in Central Oman, although with recent oil wealth and mobility has spread over other parts of the Sultanate.

According to the U.S. Central Intelligence Agency (CIA), the main languages spoken in Oman besides Arabic are English, Malayalam, Baluchi (Southern Baluchi), Urdu, Tamil, Bengali, Hindi, Tulu and various other Indian languages, due to the influx of Pakistani migrants and foreign workers. English is widely spoken in the business community and is taught at school from an early age. Almost all signs and writings appear in both Arabic and English at tourist sites. Sindhi language and its various dialects like (Jadgali, Lawati, Maimani, Kutchi, Al Saigh) are also spoken in Oman. Additionally, Swahili is sometimes spoken among Omanis of Zanzibari descent.

Today, the Mehri language is limited in its distribution to the area around Salalah, in Zafar and westward into the Yemen. But until the 18th or 19th century it was spoken further north, perhaps into Central Oman. Endangered indigenous languages in Oman include Kumzari, Bathari, Harsusi, Hobyot, Jibbali and Mehri. Omani Sign Language is the language of the deaf community.

=== Religion ===
Religion in Oman (2020)
1. Islam (85.9%)
2. Christianity (6.40%)
3. Hinduism (5.70%)
4. Buddhism (0.80%)
5. Judaism (0.10%)
6. Other (0.20%)

Even though the Oman government does not keep statistics on religious affiliation, statistics from the US's Central Intelligence Agency state that adherents of Islam are in the majority at 85.9 percent, while 6.4 percent are Christians, 5.7 percent Hindus, 0.8 percent Buddhists, and fewer than 0.1 percent are Jews; members of other religious affiliations comprise 1 percent and the unaffiliated 0.2 percent.

Virtually all Omanis are Muslims; these predominantly follow the Ibadi school of Islam, followed by the Shafi`i school of Sunni Islam followed in Northern Oman, particularly in the Al Batinah North and Al Batinah South governorates, with a very small minority following the Twelver school of Shia Islam practiced by Omani Ajam tribes. Most non-Muslims in Oman are foreign workers, variously adhering to Jainism, Buddhism, Zoroastrianism, Sikhism, Hinduism, or Christianity. Christian communities are centred in the major urban areas of Muscat, Sohar and Salalah. These include Catholic, Eastern Orthodox and various Protestant congregations, organising along linguistic and ethnic lines. More than 50 different Christian groups, fellowships and assemblies are active in the Muscat metropolitan area, formed by migrant workers from Southeast Asia.

There are also communities of ethnic Indian Hindus and Christians, as well as a small Sikh community.

=== Education ===
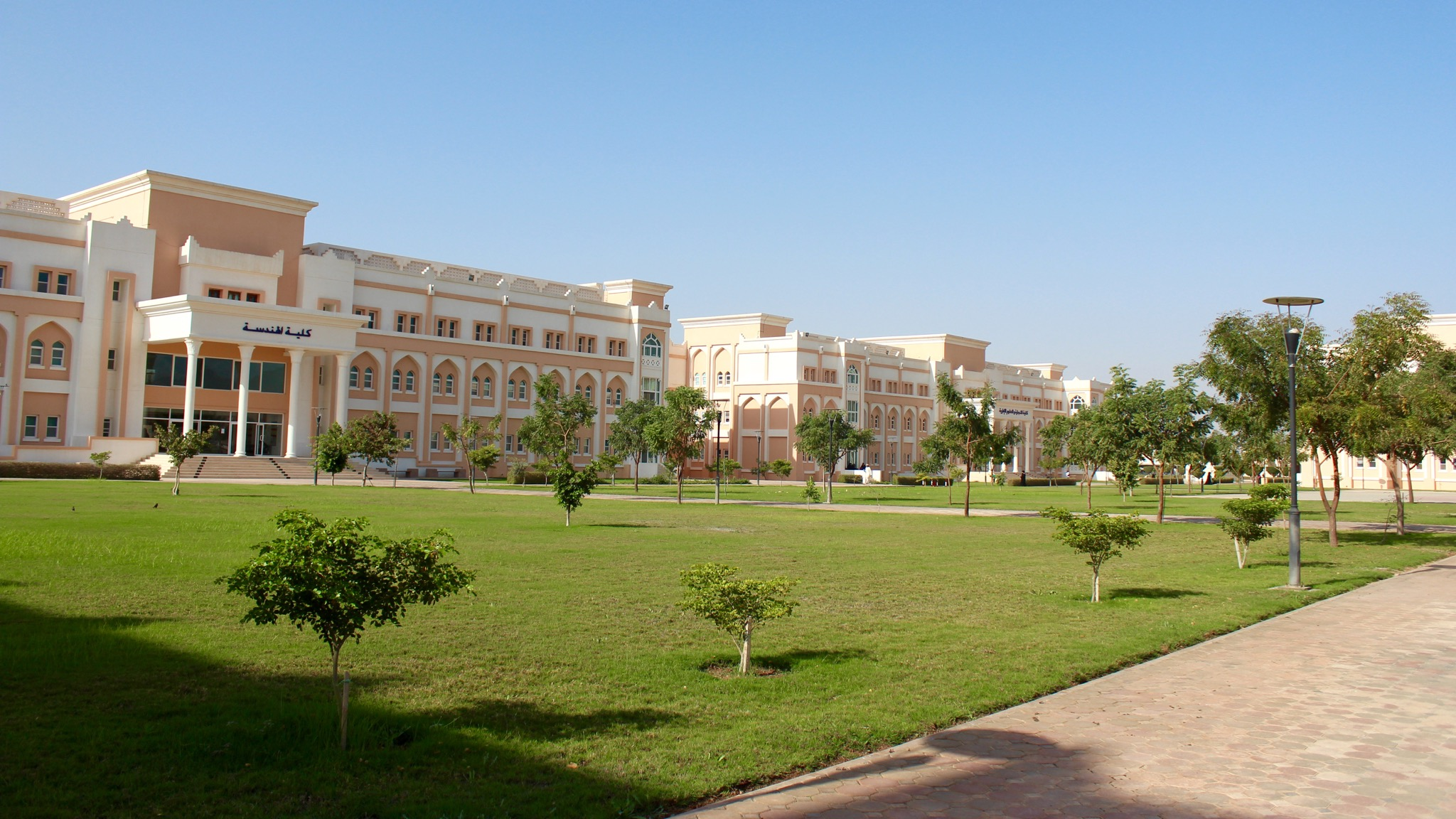
Dhofar University in Salalah

Oman scored high as of 2019 on the percentage of students who complete lower secondary school and on the literacy rate between the age of 15 and 24, 99.7 percent and 98.7 percent, respectively. However, Oman's net primary school enrolment rate in 2019, which is 94.1 percent, is rated as "challenges remain" by the United Nations Sustainable Development Goals (UNSDG) standard. Oman's overall evaluation in quality of education, according to UNSDG, is 94.8 ("challenges remain") as of 2019.

Oman's higher education produces a surplus in humanities and liberal arts, while it produces an insufficient number in technical and scientific fields and required skill-sets to meet the market demand. Further, sufficient human capital creates a business environment that can compete with, partner or attract foreign firms. Accreditation standards and mechanisms with a quality control that focuses on input assessments, rather than output, are areas of improvement in Oman, according to the United Nations Conference on Trade and Development 2014 report. The transformation Index BTI 2018 report on Oman recommends that the education curriculum should focus more on the "promotion of personal initiative and critical perspective". Oman was ranked 84th in the Global Innovation Index in 2020, down from 80th in 2019.

The adult literacy rate in 2010 was 86.9 percent.

According to the Webometrics Ranking of World Universities, the top-ranking universities in the country are Sultan Qaboos University (1678th worldwide), Dhofar University (6011th) and the University of Nizwa (6093rd).

=== Health ===
Since 2003, Oman's undernourished share of the population has dropped from 11.7 percent to 5.4 percent in 2016, but the rate remains high: double the level of high-income economies (2.7 percent) in 2016. The UNSDG targets zero hunger by 2030. Oman's coverage of essential health services in 2015 was 77 percent, which is relatively higher than the world's average of approximately 54 percent during the same year, but lower than high-income economies' level (83 percent) in 2015.

Since 1995, the percentage of Omani children who receive key vaccines has consistently been very high (above 99 percent). As for road incident death rates, Oman's rate has been decreasing since 1990, from 98.9 per 100,000 individuals to 47.1 per 100,000 in 2017, however, the rate remains significantly above average, which was 15.8 per 100,000 in 2017. Oman's health spending to GDP between 2015 and 2016 averaged 4.3 percent, while the world's average during the same period averaged 10 percent.

As for mortality due to air pollution (household and ambient air pollution), Oman's rate was 53.9 per 100,000 population as of 2016. However, in 2019 the WHO ranked Oman as the least polluted country in the Arab world, with a score of 37.7 in the pollution index. The country ranked 112th in Asia among the list of highest polluted countries.

Life expectancy at birth in Oman was estimated to be 76.1 years in 2010. As of 2010, there were an estimated 2.1 physicians and 2.1 hospital beds per 1,000 people. In 1993, 89 percent of the population had access to health care services. In 2000, 99 percent of the population had access to health care services. In 2000, Oman's health system was ranked number 8 by the WHO.

=== Currency ===
The Omani rial (Arabic: ريال عُماني; ISO code: OMR) is the official currency of the Sultanate of Oman. Issued by the Central Bank of Oman (CBO), the rial is subdivided into 1,000 baisa (also written baiza, بيسة) — making it one of only a handful of currencies in the world divided into 1,000 rather than 100 subunits. As of 2025, the Omani rial is the third-highest-valued currency unit in the world, after the Kuwaiti dinar and the Bahraini dinar.

== Culture ==
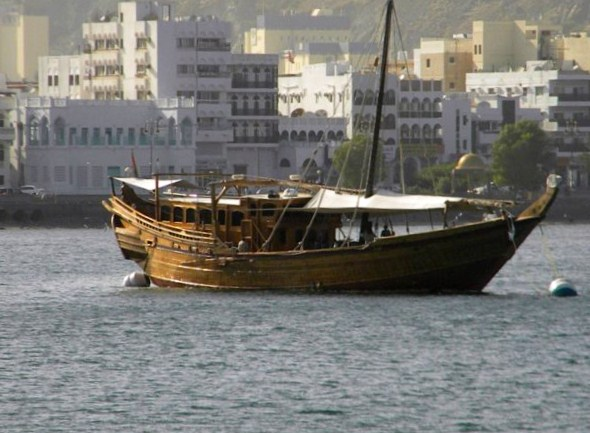
The traditional dhow, an enduring symbol of Oman

Outwardly, Oman shares many of the cultural characteristics of its Arab neighbours, particularly those in the Gulf Cooperation Council. Despite these similarities, important factors make Oman unique in the Middle East. These result as much from geography and history as from culture and economics. The relatively recent and artificial nature of the state in Oman makes it difficult to describe a national culture; however, sufficient cultural heterogeneity exists within its national boundaries to make Oman distinct from other Arab States of the Persian Gulf. Oman's cultural diversity is greater than that of its Arab neighbours, given its historical expansion to the Swahili Coast and the Indian Ocean.

Oman has a long tradition of shipbuilding, as maritime travel played a major role in the Omanis' ability to stay in contact with the civilisations of the ancient world. Sur was one of the most famous shipbuilding cities of the Indian Ocean. An al Ghanja ship takes one whole year to build. Other types of Omani ship include As Sunbouq and Al Badan.

=== Dress ===
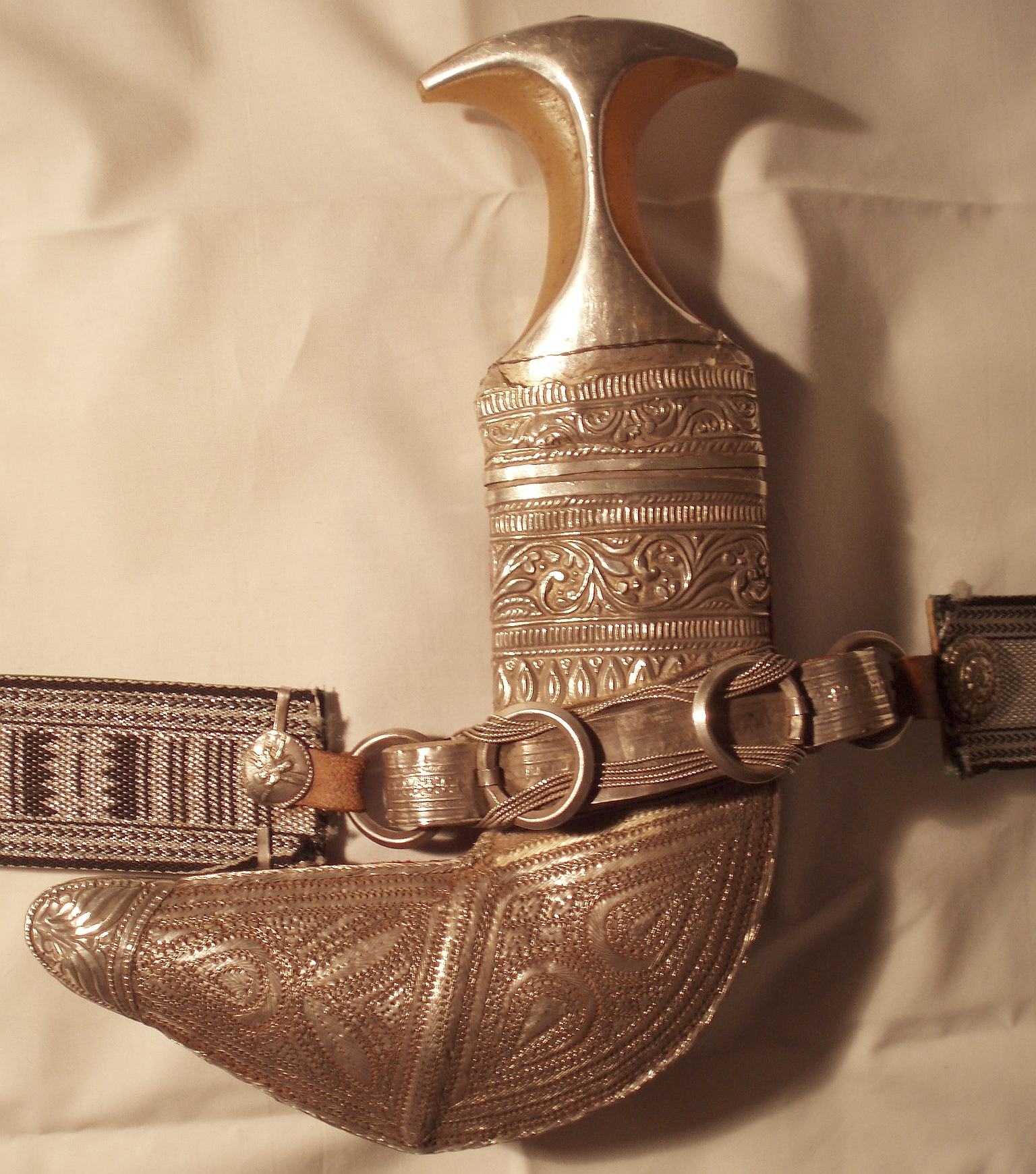
Khanjar, the traditional dagger of Oman (c. 1924)

The male national dress in Oman consists of the dishdasha, a simple, ankle-length, collarless gown with long sleeves. Worn by nearly every Omani male, it is most frequently white in colour but may also appear in a variety of other colours. Its main adornment, a tassel (furakha or farakh) sewn into the neckline, can be impregnated with perfume. Underneath the dishdasha, men wear a plain, wide strip of cloth wrapped around the body from the waist down. The most noted regional differences in dishdasha designs are the style with which they are embroidered, which varies according to age group. On extremely formal occasions a black or beige cloak called a bisht may cover the dishdasha. The embroidery edging the cloak is often in silver or gold thread and it is intricate in detail.

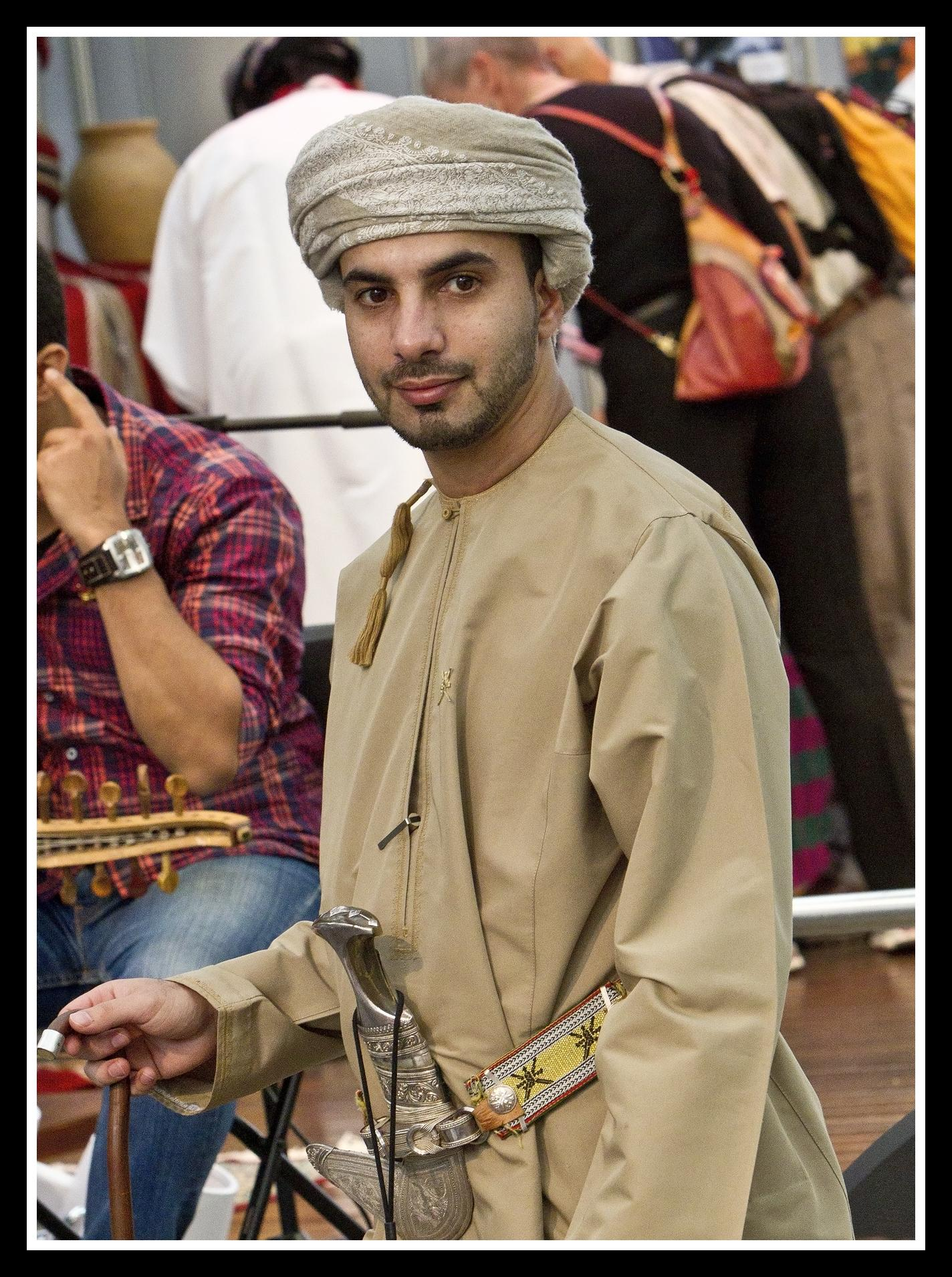
An Omani man wearing a beige dishdasha, a Musar with a Khanjar worn at his waist, holding an assa.

Omani men wear two types of headdress:

- the ghutra, also called "Musar" a square piece of woven wool or cotton fabric of a single colour, decorated with various embroidered patterns. Occasionally, an accessory similar to the Agal called the Khizam is tied upon the Musar.
- the kummah, a cap that is the head dress worn during leisure hours.

Some men carry the assa, a stick, which can have practical uses or is simply used as an accessory during formal events. Omani men, on the whole, wear sandals on their feet.

The Khanjar (dagger) forms part of the national dress and men wear the Khanjar on all formal public occasions and festivals. It is traditionally worn at the waist. Sheaths may vary from simple covers to ornate silver or gold-decorated pieces. A depiction of a Khanjar appears on the national flag.

Omani women wear national costumes, with distinctive regional variations. All costumes incorporate vivid colours and vibrant embroidery and decorations. The Omani women's traditional costume comprises several garments: the kandoorah, which is a long tunic whose sleeves or radoon are adorned with hand-stitched embroidery of various designs. The dishdasha is worn over a pair of loose-fitting trousers, tight at the ankles, known as a sirwal. Women also wear a head shawl most commonly referred to as the lihaf.

As of 2014 women reserve wearing their traditional dress for special occasions, and instead wear a loose black cloak called an abaya over their personal choice of clothing, whilst in some regions, particularly amongst the Bedouin, the burqa is still worn. Women wear hijab, and though some women cover their faces and hands, most do not. The Sultan has forbidden the covering of faces in public office.

=== Art ===
Traditional art in Oman stems from its long heritage of material culture. Art movements in the 20th century reveal that the art scene in Oman began with early practices that included a range of tribal handicrafts and self-portraiture in painting since the 1960s. However, since the inclusion of several Omani artists in international collections, art exhibitions, and events, such Alia Al Farsi, the first Omani artist to show at the last Venice Biennale and Radhika Khimji, the first Omani artist to exhibit at both the Marrakesh and Haiti Ghetto biennale, Oman's position as a newcomer to the contemporary art scene in recent years has been more important for Oman's international exposure.

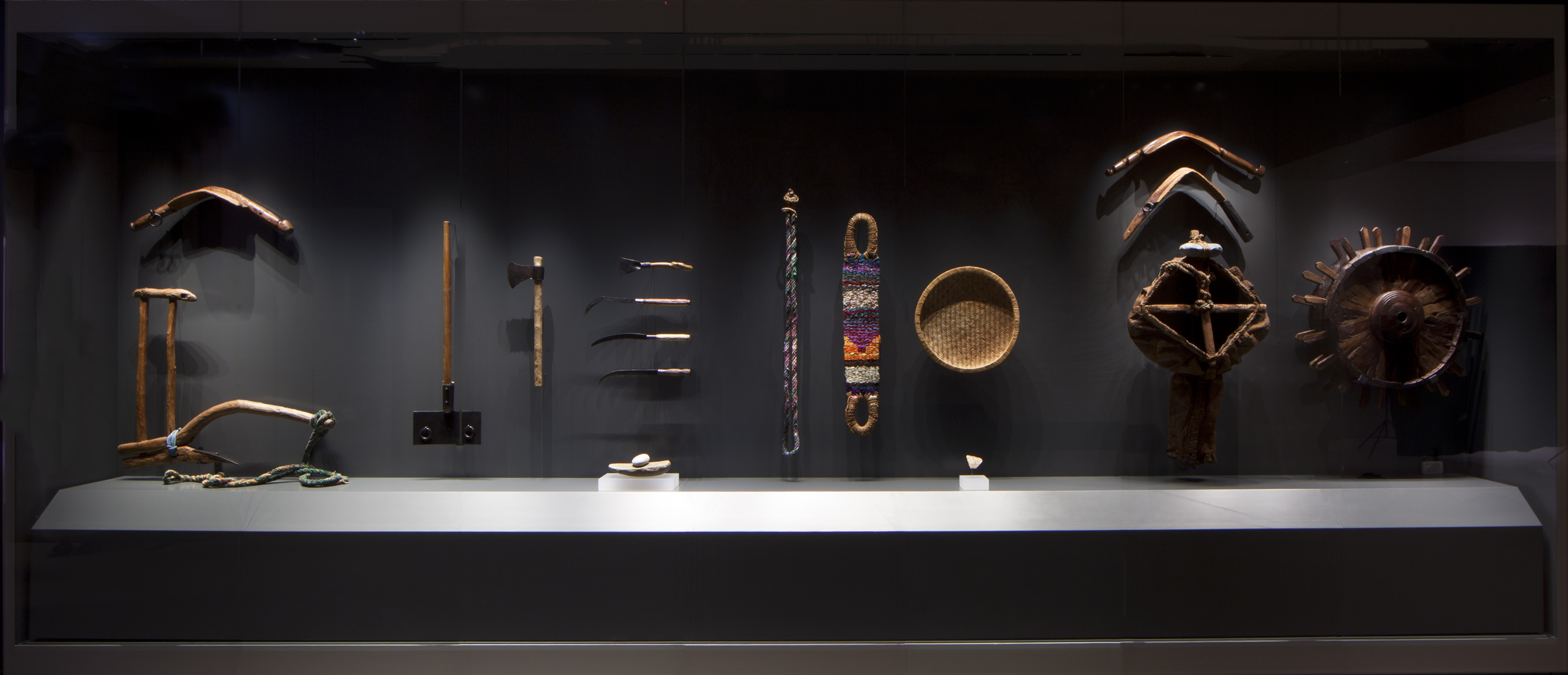
Ancient irrigation system and water channels. Aflaj Gallery, The National Museum of Oman.

Bait Muzna Gallery is the first art gallery in Oman. Established in 2000 by Sayyida Susan Al Said, Bait Muzna has served as a platform for emerging Omani artists to showcase their talent and place themselves on the wider art scene. In 2016, Bait Muzna opened a second space in Salalah to branch out and support art film and the digital art scene. The gallery has been primarily active as an art consultancy. The Omani Society for Fine Arts, established in 1993, offers educational programmes, workshops and artist grants for practitioners across varied disciplines.

The Sultanate's flagship cultural institution, the National Museum of Oman, opened on 30 July 2016 with 14 permanent galleries. It showcases national heritage from the earliest human settlement in Oman two million years ago through to the present day. The museum takes a further step by presenting information on the material in Arabic Braille script for the visually impaired, the first museum to do this in the Gulf region. Bait Al Zubair Museum is a private, family-funded museum that opened its doors to the public in 1998. In 1999, the museum received Sultan Qaboos' Award for Architectural Excellence. Bait Al Zubair displays the family's collection of Omani artifacts.

=== Music and cinema ===
The Music of Oman is extremely diverse due to Oman's imperial legacy. There are over 130 different forms of traditional Omani songs and dances, with the Oman Centre for Traditional Music being created in 1984 to preserve them. All of Oman's traditional music is sustained by oral transmission between generations, and each region has its own unique forms. There are songs for special occasions, songs for seafarers, fishermen, Bedouins and mountain farmers. Traditional songs originating from the desert are often in praise of the camel, which has been described in the Holy Quran. Al Taghrud, sung while riding camels, and Al Taariq, a Bedouin song with two singers taking turns to sing verses, are two of the best examples of traditional desert songs.

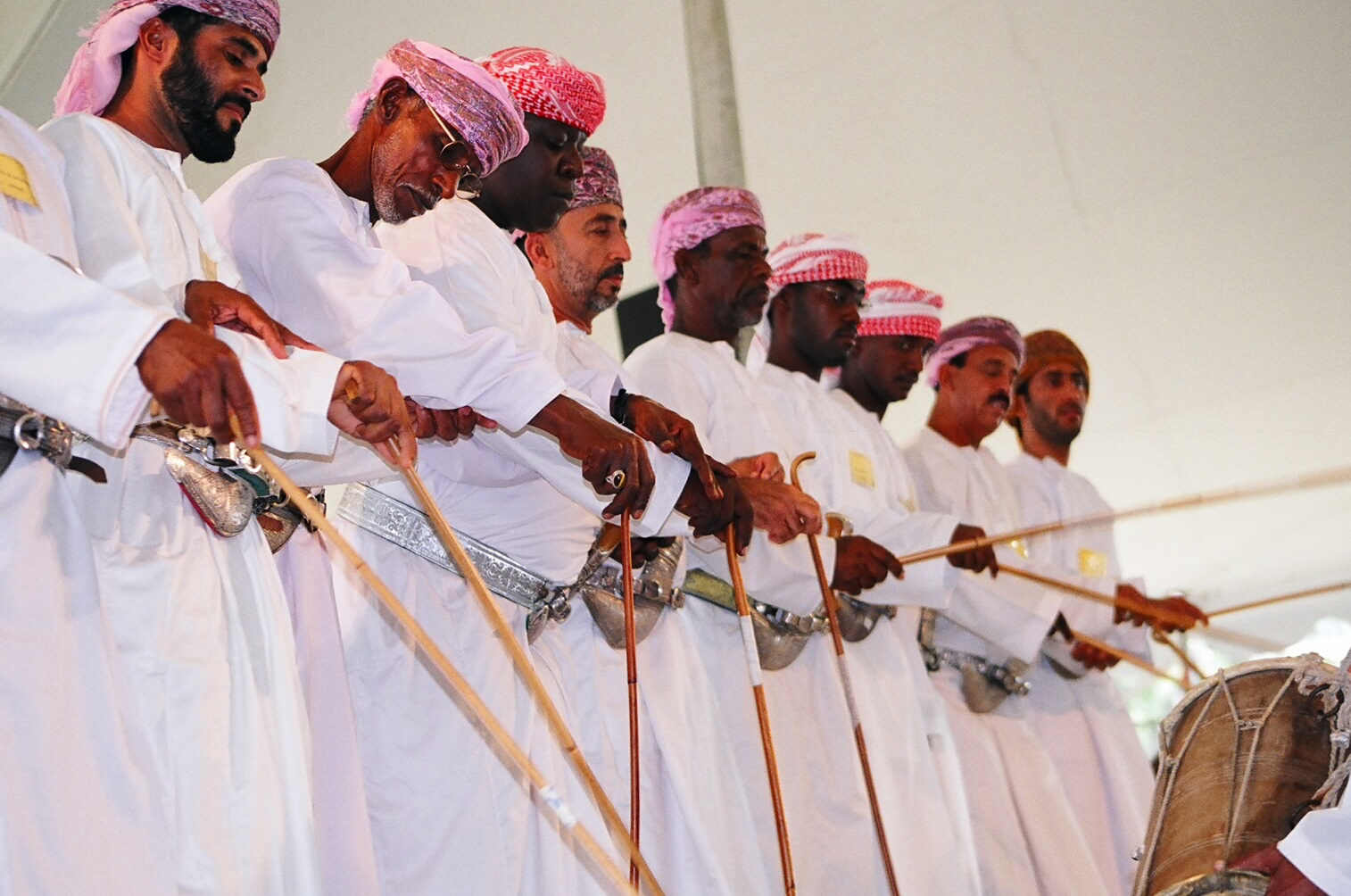
An Omani Razfa dance

Omani traditional dances include Al-Razha, a traditional war dance characterised by its use of the sword and its exchange of poetry between men. Al Razfa, also known as the Yowlah, is performed by men, where two rows form to create a dual chorus that delivers chants and poetry in an antiphonal style, accompanied by drums and other instruments. The music and poetry performed during the dance is referred to as Harbiya music, with Omani Harbiya groups frequently performing at weddings, cultural festivals, national celebrations, and community gatherings.

In 1985, Sultan Qaboos founded the Royal Oman Symphony Orchestra. Instead of engaging foreign musicians, he decided to establish an orchestra made up of Omanis. On 1 July 1987 at the Al Bustan Palace Hotel's Oman Auditorium the Royal Oman Symphony Orchestra gave its inaugural concert. In popular music, a seven-minute music video about Oman went viral, achieving 500,000 views on YouTube within 10 days of being released on YouTube in November 2015. The a cappella production features three of the region's most popular talents: Kahliji musician Al Wasmi, Omani poet Mazin Al-Haddabi and actress Buthaina Al Raisi.

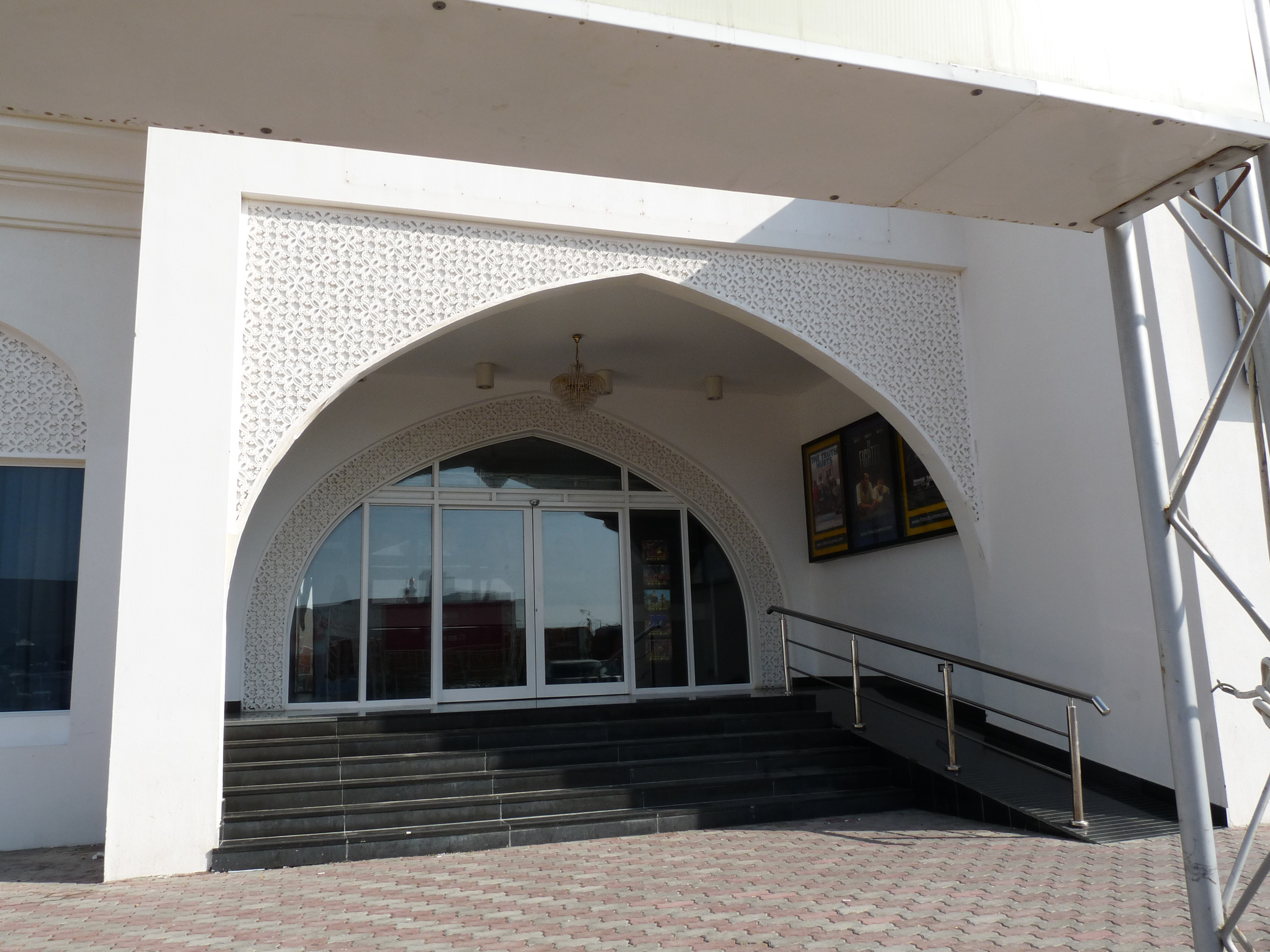
Cinema in Sur

The cinema of Oman is very small, there being only one Omani film Al-Boom (2006) as of 2007. Oman Arab Cinema Company LLC is the single largest motion picture exhibitor chain in Oman.

=== Media ===
The government has continuously held a monopoly on television in Oman. Oman TV is the only state-owned national television channel broadcaster in Oman. Oman TV broadcasts four HD channels, including Oman TV General, Oman TV Sport, Oman TV Live and Oman TV Cultural. Although private ownership of radio and television stations is permitted, Oman has only one privately owned television channel. Majan TV is the first private TV channel in Oman. It began broadcasting in January 2009. However, Majan TV's official channel website was last updated in early 2010. The public has access to foreign broadcasts since the use of satellite receivers is allowed.

Oman Radio is the first and only state-owned radio channel. It began broadcasting on 30 July 1970. It operates both Arabic and English networks. Other private channels include Hala FM, Hi FM, Al-Wisal, Virgin Radio Oman FM and Merge. In early 2018, Muscat Media Group (MMG) launched a new private radio station.

Oman has nine main newspapers, five in Arabic and four in English.

The media landscape in Oman has been continuously described as restrictive, censored, and subdued. The Ministry of Information censors politically, culturally, or sexually offensive material in domestic or foreign media. The press freedom group Reporters Without Borders ranked the country 127th out of 180 countries on its 2018 World Press Freedom Index. In 2016, the government drew international criticism for suspending the newspaper Azamn and arresting three journalists after a report on corruption in the country's judiciary. Azamn was not allowed to reopen in 2017 although an appeal court ruled in late 2016 that the paper can resume operating.

=== Cuisine ===
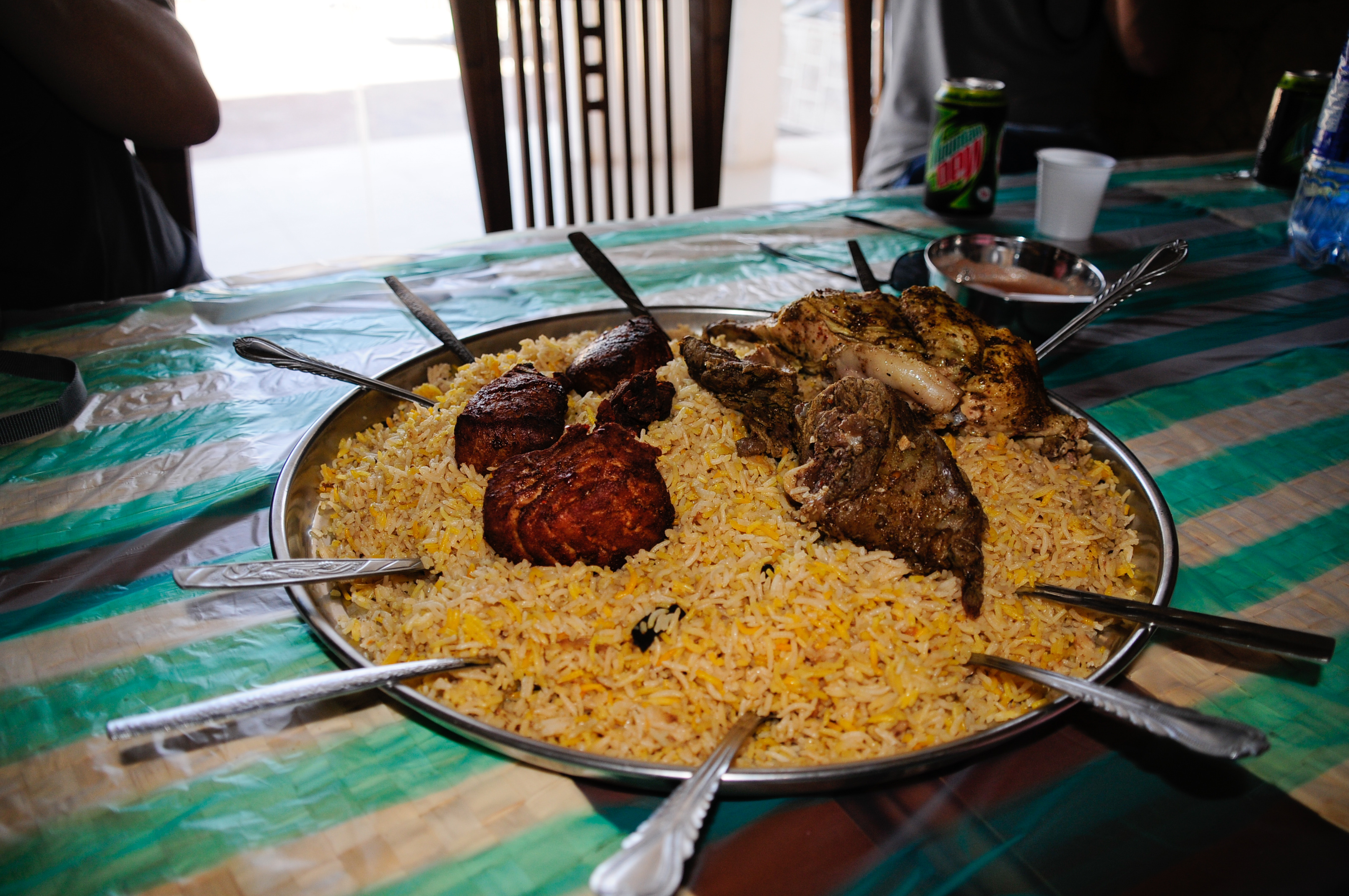
Traditional Omani food

Omani cuisine is diverse and has been influenced by many cultures. Omanis usually eat their main daily meal at midday, while the evening meal is lighter. During Ramadan, dinner is typically served after the Taraweeh prayers, sometimes as late as 11 pm.

Arsia, a festival meal served during celebrations, consists of mashed rice and meat (sometimes chicken). Another popular festival meal, shuwa, consists of meat cooked very slowly (sometimes for up to 2 days) in an underground clay oven. Fish is often used in main dishes too, and the kingfish is a popular ingredient. Mashuai is a meal consisting of a whole spit-roasted kingfish served with lemon rice. Rukhal bread is a thin, round bread eaten at any meal, typically served with Omani honey for breakfast or crumbled over curry for dinner. The Omani halwa is a very popular sweet, consisting of cooked raw sugar with nuts. There are many different flavours, the most popular ones being black halwa (original) and saffron halwa. Halwa is considered a symbol of Omani hospitality, traditionally served with coffee. As is the case with most Arab states of the Persian Gulf, alcohol is only available over the counter to non-Muslims.

=== Sports ===
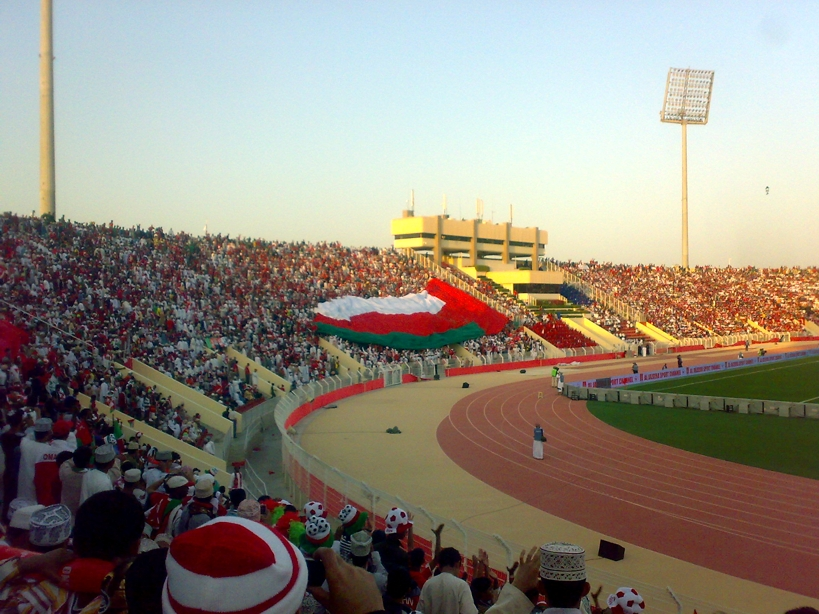
Oman hosted and won the 19th Arabian Gulf Cup

In October 2004, the Omani government set up a Ministry of Sports Affairs to replace the General Organisation for Youth, Sports and Cultural Affairs. The 19th Arabian Gulf Cup took place in Muscat, from 4 to 17 January 2009 and was won by the Omani national football team. The 23rd Arabian Gulf Cup that took place in Kuwait, from 22 December 2017 until 5 January 2018 with Oman winning their second title, defeating the United Arab Emirates in the final.

Oman's traditional sports are dhow racing, horse racing, camel racing, bull fighting and falconry. Association football, basketball, waterskiing and sandboarding are among the sports that have emerged quickly and gained popularity among the younger generation. Oman, along with Fujairah in the UAE, are the only regions in the Middle East that have a variant of bullfighting, known as 'bull-butting', organised within their territories. Al-Batena area in Oman is specifically prominent for such events.

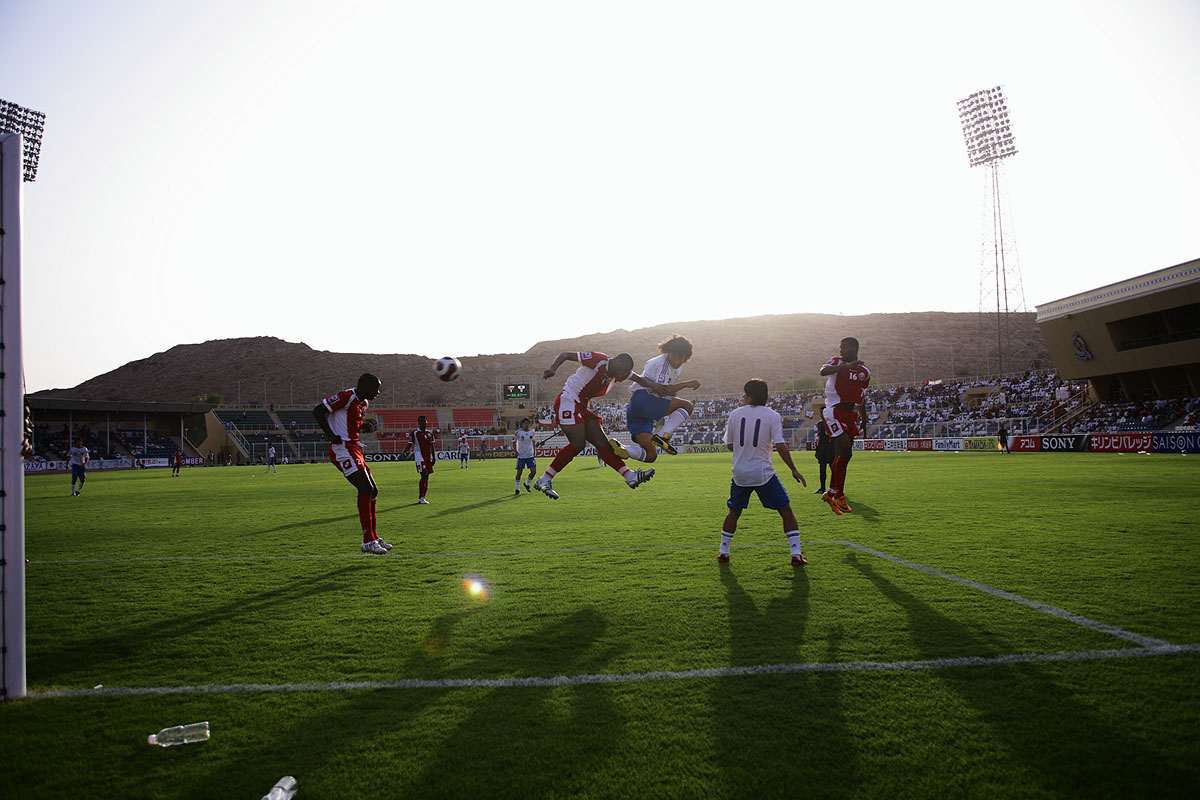
2010 FIFA World Cup Qualifiers Round 3 match between Oman and Japan at the Royal Oman Police Stadium on 7 June 2008 in Muscat, Oman

The Oman Olympic Committee played a major part in organising the highly successful 2003 Olympic Days, which were of great benefit to the sports associations, clubs, and young participants. The football association took part, along with the handball, basketball, rugby union, field hockey, volleyball, athletics, swimming and tennis associations. In 2010 Muscat hosted the 2010 Asian Beach Games. Oman featured a men's national team in beach volleyball that competed at the 2018–2020 AVC Beach Volleyball Continental Cup.

Oman also hosts tennis tournaments each year. The Sultan Qaboos Sports Complex stadium contains a 50-metre swimming pool that is used for international tournaments. The Tour of Oman, a professional cycling 6-day stage race, takes place in February. Oman hosted the Asian 2011 FIFA Beach Soccer World Cup qualifiers, where 11 teams competed for three spots at the FIFA World Cup. Oman hosted the Men's and Women's 2012 Beach Handball World Championships at the Millennium Resort in Mussanah, from 8 to 13 July. The first "El Clasico" to be played outside of Spain, was played on 14 March 2014, at the Sultan Qaboos Sports Complex.

Oman has competed repeatedly for a position in the FIFA World Cup, but have not yet qualified to compete in the tournament. In cricket, Oman qualified for the 2016 ICC World Twenty20 and the 2021 T20 Cricket World Cup. On 25 June 2021, it was confirmed that Oman will co-host the 2021 edition of the ICC Men's T20 World Cup alongside the United Arab Emirates. In 2024, Oman participated in the 2024 Touch Rugby World Cup in Nottingham, which was its first participation in an international rugby tournament.

== Gallery ==
Muscat, Oman

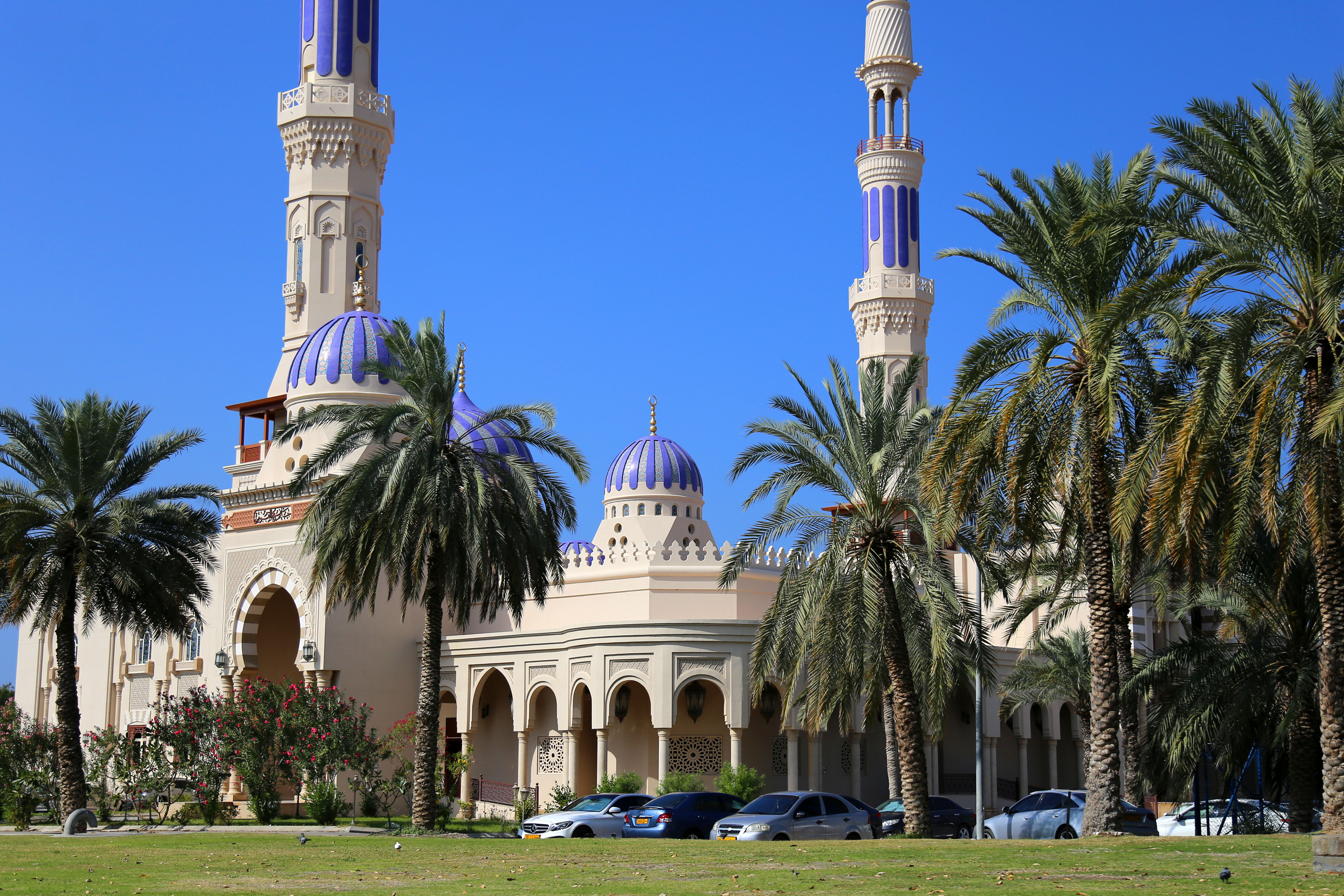
A mosque in Muscat, Oman

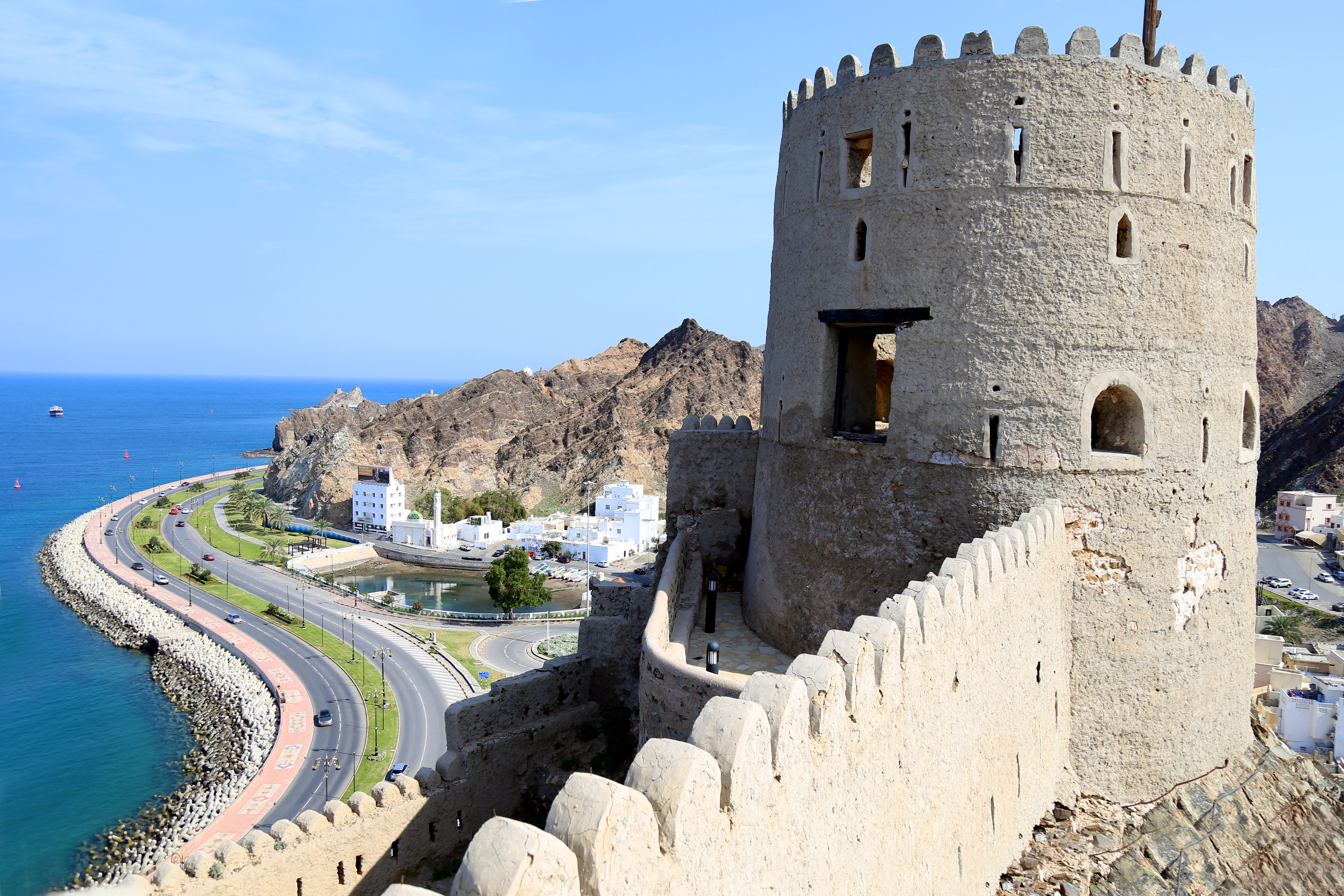
Mutrah Fort, Muscat, Oman

Sultan Qaboos Grand Mosque, Muscat, Oman

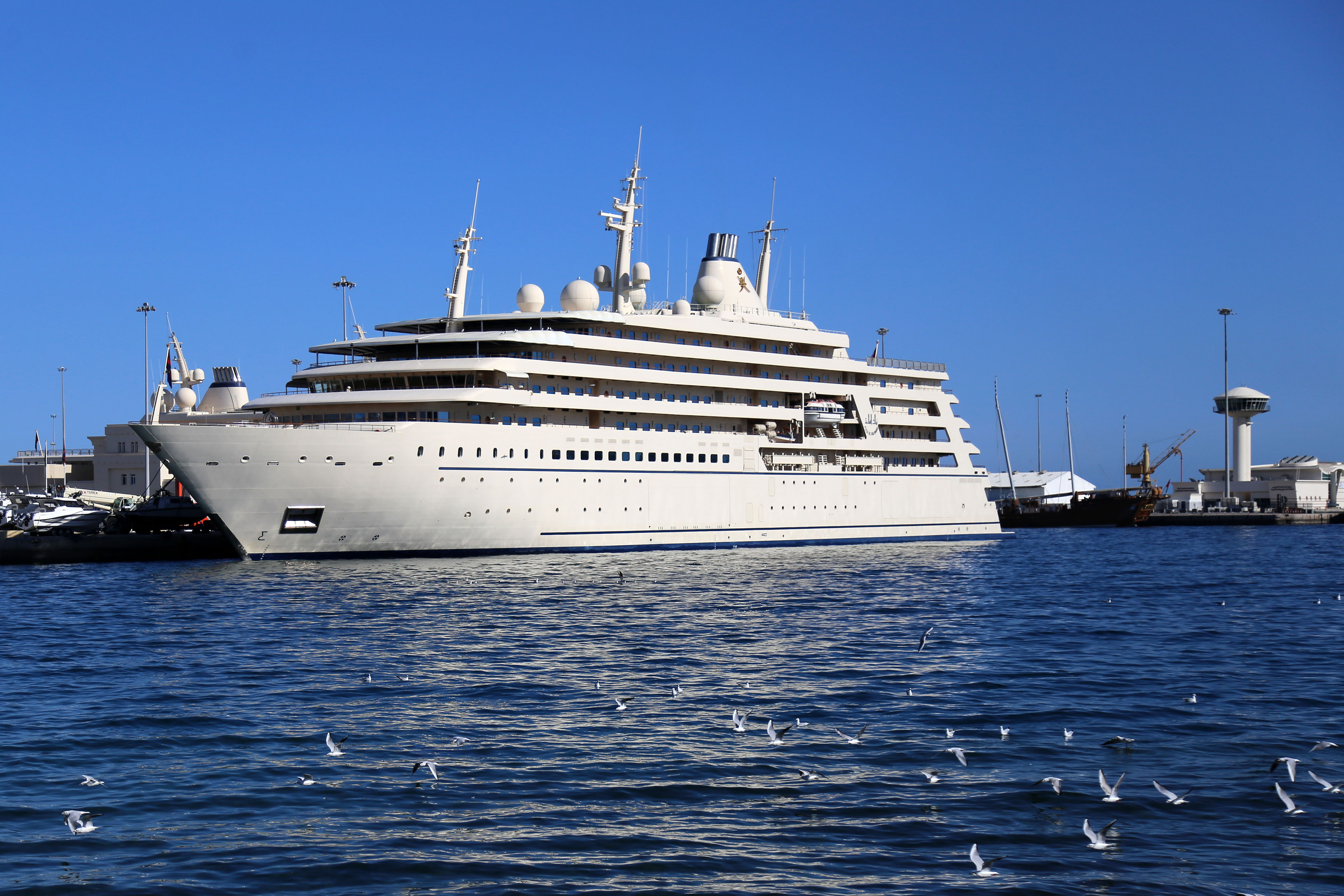
Sultan's Ship, Mutrah, Muscat, Oman

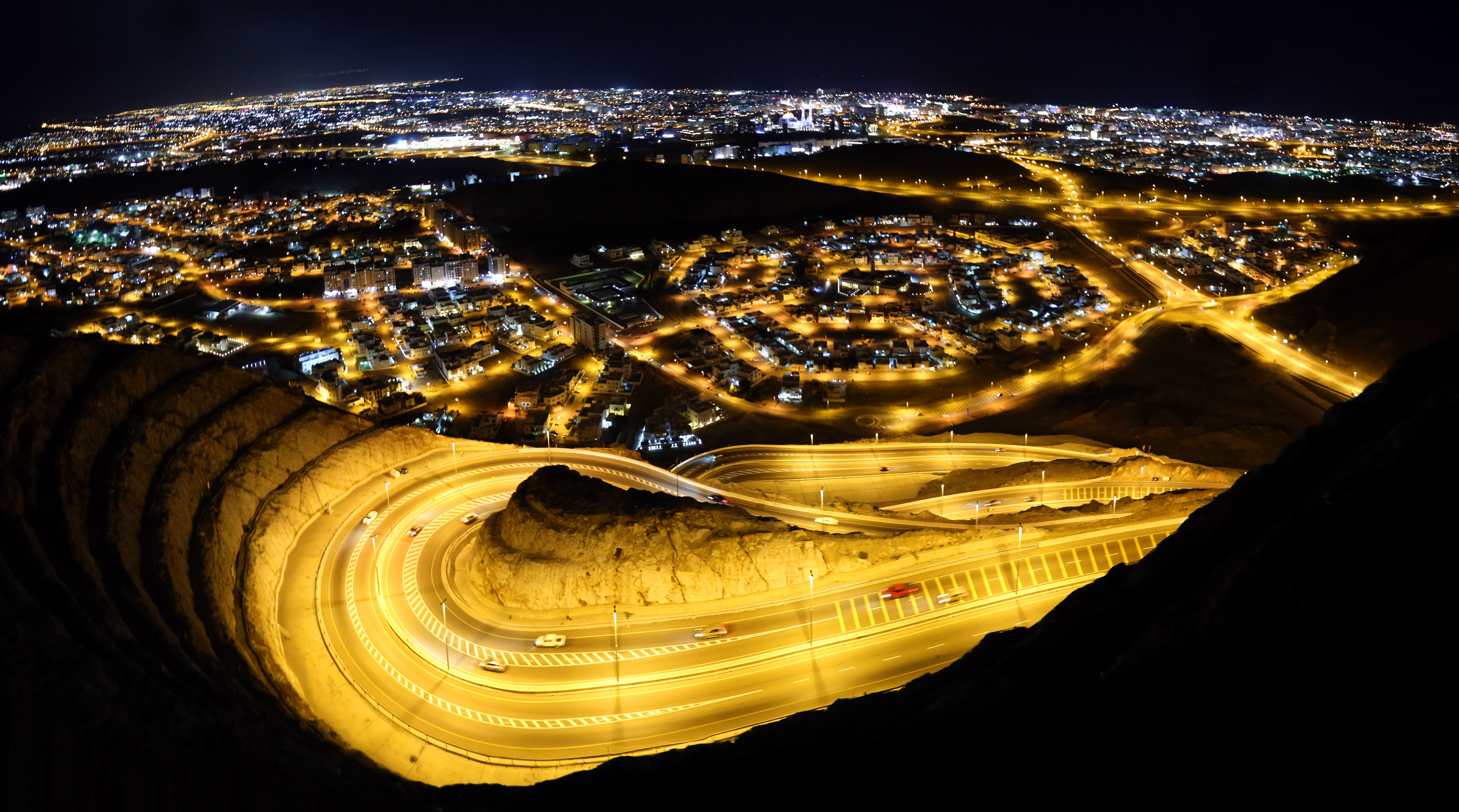
Al Amarat Hills, Muscat, Oman

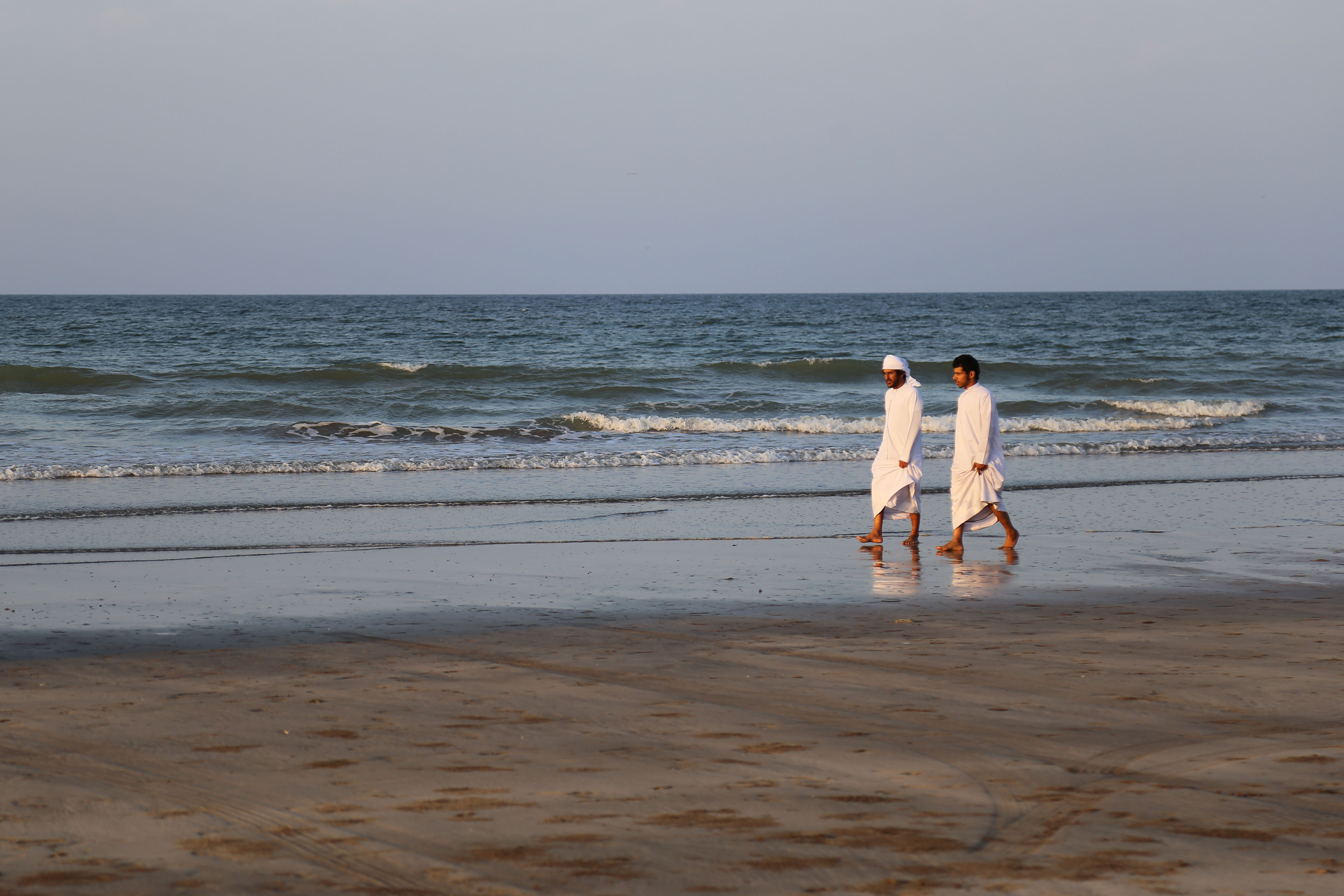
Al Azaiba Beach, Muscat, Oman

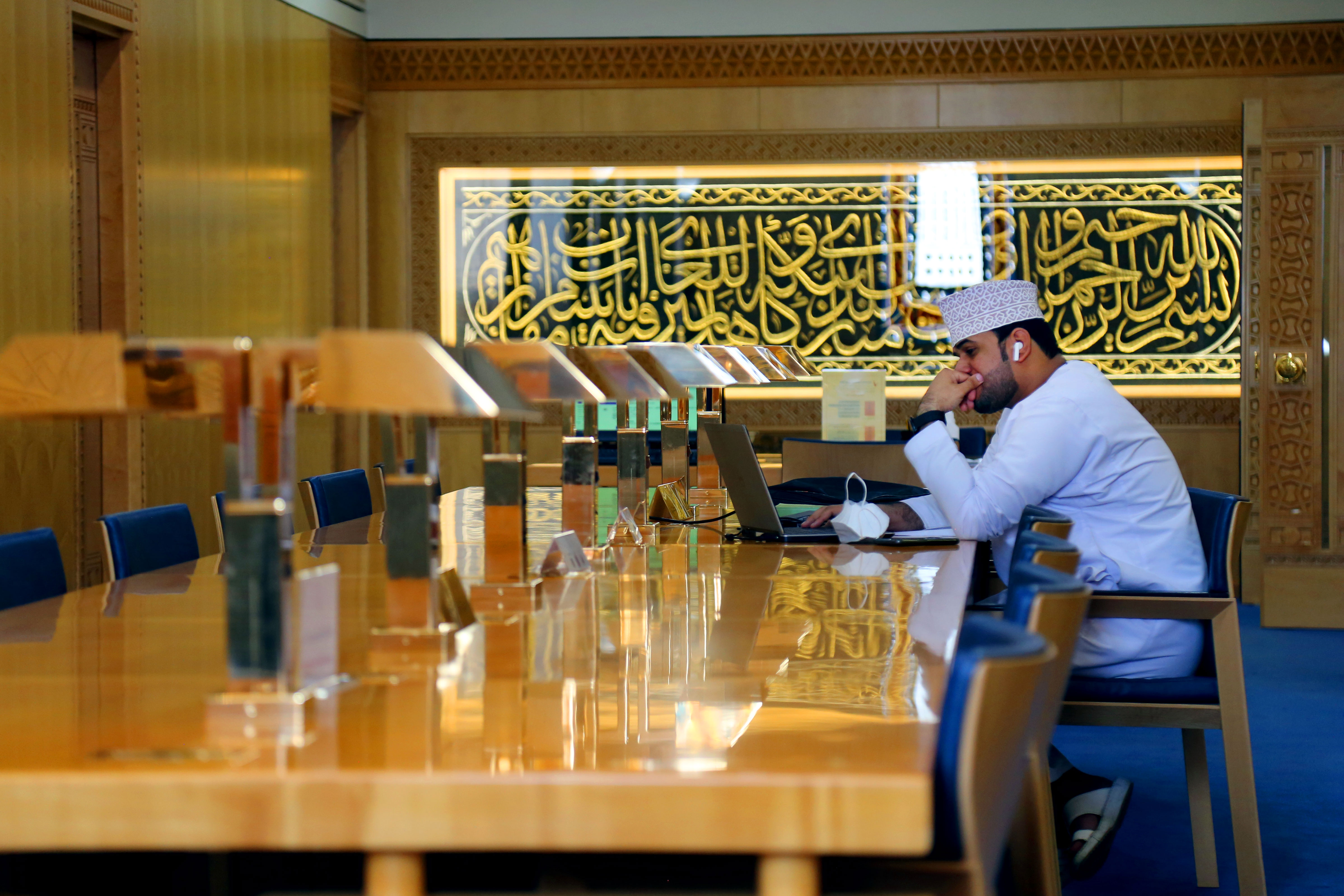
Library of Sultan Qaboos Grand Mosque, Muscat, Oman

== See also ==
- Omanis
- Outline of Oman
- Sultan Haitham City
