= Demographics of Oman =

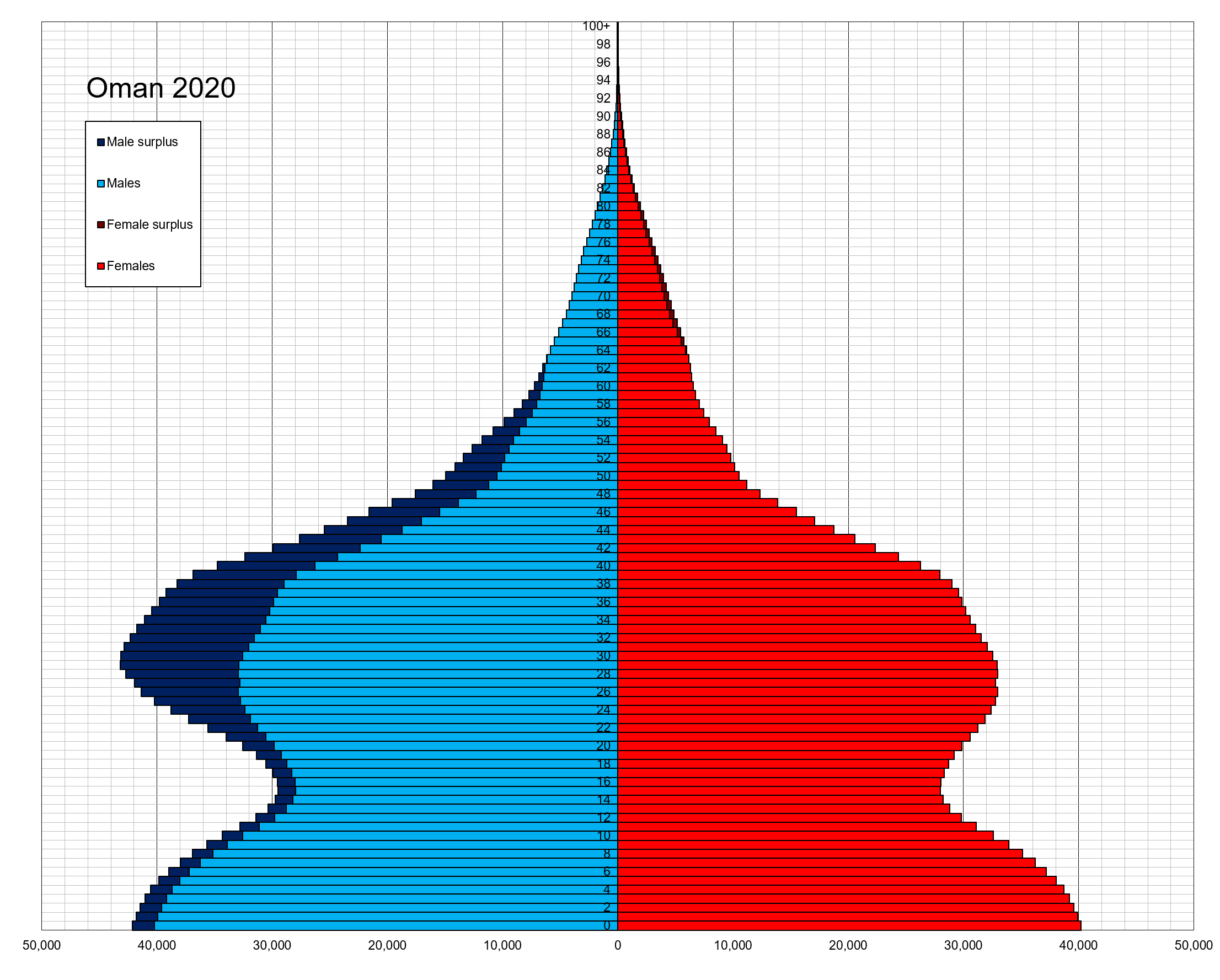
- Population pyramid of Oman in 2020
- Population: 5,359,557 (December 2025)
- Growth rate: 1.84% (2022 est.)
- Birth rate: 22.11 births/1,000 population (2022 est.)
- Death rate: 3.23 deaths/1,000 population (2022 est.)
- Life expectancy: 76.9 years
  - male: 74.96 years
  - female: 78.93 years (2022 est.)
- Fertility rate: 2.7 children born/woman (2022 est.)
- Infant mortality: 14.45 deaths/1,000 live births
- Net migration rate: -0.45 migrant(s)/1,000 population (2022 est.)
- Immigrant share: 43.2% (2024)

Age structure
- 0–14 years: 26.53%
- 15–64 years: 70.88%
- 65 and over: 2.59%

Sex ratio
- Total: 1.17 male(s)/female (2022 est.)
- At birth: 1.05 male(s)/female
- Under 15: 1.05 male(s)/female
- 65 and over: 0.79 male(s)/female

Nationality
- Nationality: Omani

Language
- Official: Arabic

Demographics of the population of Oman include population density, ethnicity, education level, health of the populace, economic status, religious affiliations and other aspects.

About 50% of the population in Oman lives in Muscat and the Batinah coastal plain northwest of the capital; about 200,000 live in the Dhofar Governorate; and about 30,000 live in the remote Musandam Peninsula on the Strait of Hormuz.

Since 1970, the government has given high priority to education in order to develop a domestic work force, which the government considers a vital factor in the country's economic and social progress. In 1986, Oman's first university, Sultan Qaboos University, opened. Other post secondary institutions include a law school, technical college, banking institute, teachers' training college, and health sciences institute. Some 200 scholarships are awarded each year for study abroad.

Nine private colleges exist, providing two-year post secondary diplomas. Since 1999, the government has embarked on reforms in higher education designed to meet the needs of a growing population. Under the reformed system, four public regional universities were created, and incentives are provided by the government to promote the upgrading of the existing nine private colleges and the creation of other degree-granting private colleges.

== Population ==
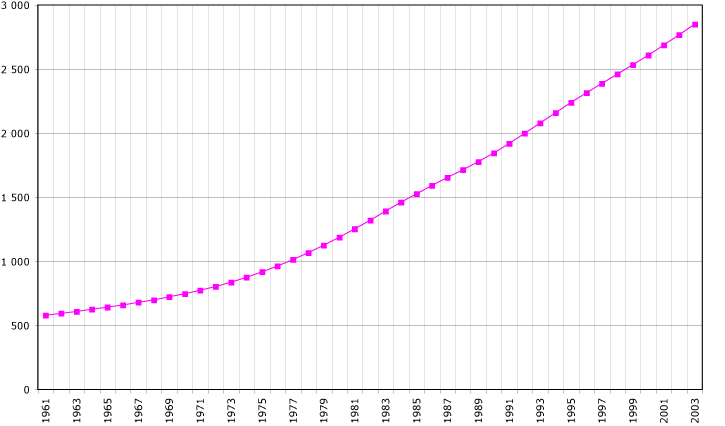
Demographics of Oman, Data of FAO, year 2005; Number of inhabitants in thousands.

=== Census results ===
	Total population	Omani population		Expatriate population	
1993	2,000,000	1,465,000	73.3%	535,000	26.7%
2003	2,340,815	1,781,558	76.1%	559,257	23.9%
2010	2,773,479	1,957,336	70.6%	816,143	29.4%
2014	4,092,000	2,303,000	56.3%	1,789,000	43.7%
2016	4,550,538	2,462,768	54.1%	2,082,478	46.1%
2020	5,106,458	2,994,601	59.98%	1,997,763	40.02%
2024	5,268,072	2,988,648	56.68%	2,284,336	43.32%

=== UN estimates ===
Historical population
Year	Pop.	±% p.a.
1950	456,000	—
1960	557,000	+2.02%
1970	732,000	+2.77%
1980	1,181,000	+4.90%
1990	1,868,000	+4.69%
2000	2,264,000	+1.94%
2010	2,782,000	+2.08%
2020	5,106,458	+6.26%

	Total population (thousands)	Population aged 0–14 (%)	Population aged 15–64 (%)	Population aged 65+ (%)
1950	456	42.3	54.6	3.0
1955	501	43.6	53.2	3.2
1960	557	44.6	52.1	3.2
1965	631	45.6	51.2	3.3
1970	732	46.4	50.4	3.2
1975	898	46.1	50.9	3.0
1980	1 181	45.6	51.8	2.6
1985	1 539	46.0	51.6	2.4
1990	1 868	45.6	52.1	2.3
1995	2 232	40.3	57.5	2.2
2000	2 264	36.7	60.8	2.5
2005	2 430	32.1	65.1	2.8
2010	2 782	27.2	70.3	2.5
2015	4 321	32.1	65.1	2.8
2020	5 106	27.2	70.3	2.5

=== Structure of the population ===
Structure of the population (01.VII.2009) (Estimates):

Age group	Male	Female	Total	%
Total	1 971 115	1 202 802	3 173 917	100
0-4	139 614	132 530	272 144	8.57
5-9	124 776	120 250	245 026	7.72
10-14	129 964	124 646	254 610	8.02
15-19	145 215	139 611	284 826	8.97
20-24	238 483	148 965	387 448	12.21
25-29	327 686	147 717	475 403	14.98
30-34	247 107	120 429	367 536	11.58
35-39	192 483	79 617	272 100	8.57
40-44	149 090	58 112	207 202	6.53
45-49	103 908	41 522	145 430	4.58
50-54	83 057	30 530	113 587	3.58
55-59	40 488	19 402	59 890	1.89
60-64	23 538	16 192	39 730	1.25
65-69	11 811	9 000	20 811	0.66
70-74	7 721	7 212	14 933	0.47
75-79	3 303	3 514	6 817	0.21
80+	2 871	3 553	6 424	0.20
Age group	Male	Female	Total	Percent
0-14	394 354	377 426	771 780	24.32
15-64	1 551 055	802 097	2 353 152	74.14
65+	25 706	23 279	48 985	1.54

Structure of the population (01.VII.2012) (Estimates)

Age group	Male	Female	Total	%
Total	2 332 687	1 290 314	3 623 001	100
0-4	164 406	158 435	322 841	8.91
5-9	132 469	127 235	259 704	7.17
10-14	111 287	105 301	216 588	5.98
15-19	128 311	119 875	248 186	6.85
20-24	262 201	147 485	409 686	11.31
25-29	438 633	160 772	599 405	16.54
30-34	335 104	131 241	466 345	12.87
35-39	234 343	96 312	330 655	9.13
40-44	177 171	63 301	240 472	6.64
45-49	122 574	47 241	169 815	4.69
50-54	89 917	39 602	129 519	3.57
55-59	56 448	28 380	84 828	2.34
60-64	28 338	20 629	48 967	1.35
65-69	17 199	15 561	32 760	0.90
70-74	13 925	12 439	26 364	0.73
75-79	9 475	7 373	16 848	0,47
80+	10 882	9 113	19 995	0.55
unknown	4	19	23	<0.01
Age group	Male	Female	Total	Percent
0-14	408 162	390 971	799 133	22.06
15-64	1 873 040	854 838	2 727 878	75.29
65+	51 481	44 486	95 967	2.65

Population by Sex and Age Group (Census 12.XII.2020) (E-census data based 100% on administrative registers.):

Age group	Male	Female	Total	%
Total	2 739 954	1 731 194	4 471 148	100
0–4	225 585	217 574	443 159	9.91
5–9	214 408	205 923	420 331	9.40
10–14	164 249	158 269	322 518	7.21
15–19	128 650	123 805	252 455	5.65
20–24	178 099	126 838	304 937	6.82
25–29	364 479	167 905	532 384	11.91
30–34	426 671	185 002	611 673	13.68
35–39	355 022	159 996	515 018	11.52
40–44	245 069	122 600	367 669	8.22
45–49	162 792	78 866	241 658	5.40
50–54	107 609	52 247	159 856	3.58
55–59	67 579	39 990	107 569	2.41
60–64	43 899	32 405	76 304	1.71
65-69	21 548	21 790	43 338	0.97
70-74	14 117	15 524	29 641	0.66
75-79	9 414	10 427	19 841	0.44
80-84	6 369	6 459	12 828	0.29
85-89	2 813	3 176	5 989	0.13
90-94	1 066	1 462	2 528	0.06
95-99	319	597	916	0.02
100+	197	339	536	0.01
Age group	Male	Female	Total	Percent
0–14	604 242	581 766	1 186 008	26.53
15–64	2 079 869	1 089 654	3 169 523	70.89
65+	55 843	59 774	115 617	2.59

View source data.
View source data.
View source data.

== Vital statistics ==
=== Registered births and deaths ===
Year	Population	Live births	Deaths	Natural change	Crude birth rate (per 1000)	Crude death rate (per 1000)	Natural change (per 1000)	Crude migration change (per 1000)	Total Fertility Rate
2006	2,577,062	49,494	5,484	44,010	19.2	2.1	17.1		2.660
2007	2,743,499	52,500	6,810	45,690	19.1	2.5	16.6	45.39	2.589
2008	2,867,428	58,250	7,415	50,835	20.3	2.6	17.7	26.05	2.607
2009	3,173,917	64,735	7,098	57,637	20.4	2.2	18.2	82.38	2.669
2010	2,773,479	65,528	6,974	58,554	23.3	2.7	20.6	-154.35	2.974
2011	3,295,298	67,922	7,667	60,255	20.6	2.3	18.3	152.11	2.853
2012	3,623,001	72,867	7,884	64,983	20.1	2.2	17.9	75.95	2.818
2013	3,855,206	79,417	7,669	71,748	20.6	2.0	18.6	42.91	2.882
2014	3,992,893	82,981	7,819	75,162	21.9	2.0	19.9	15.93	2.900
2015	4,159,102	86,286	8,167	78,119	19.3	2.0	17.3	21.61	2.903
2016	4,414,051	88,346	8,828	79,518	20.0	2.0	18.0	40.93	2.888
2017	4,559,963	90,371	8,861	81,510	20.5	1.9	18.6	14.35	2.895
2018	4,601,706	89,071	8,979	80,092	19.4	1.9	17.5	-8.37	2.858
2019	4,617,927	86,819	8,581	78,238	18.8	1.9	16.9	-13.45	2.689
2020	4,481,042	84,405	10,589	73,816	18.8	2.4	16.4	-46.31	2.664
2021	4,527,446	82,224	12,649	69,575	18.2	2.8	15.4	-5.14	2.604
2022	4,933,850	77,628	10,035	67,593	15.7	2.0	13.7	71.62	2.305
2023	5,165,602	71,107	8,982	62,125	13.8	1.7	12.0	33.59	2.010
2024	5,268,072	70,209	9,201	61,008	13.3	1.7	11.6	7.96	1.913
2025	5,494,691	73,858	9,061	64,797	13.8	1.7	12.1	5.91	1.944

=== UN estimates ===
Period	Live births per year	Deaths per year	Natural change per year	CBR^{1}	CDR^{1}	NC^{1}	TFR^{1}	IMR^{1}	Life expectancy (years)
1950	25 000	16 000	8 000	53.7	35.7	18.1	7.25	277.0	29.7
1951	25 000	16 000	9 000	53.8	35.4	18.4	7.25	274.3	30.0
1952	25 000	17 000	9 000	53.8	35.0	18.7	7.25	270.4	30.5
1953	26 000	17 000	9 000	53.8	34.6	19.2	7.25	266.4	31.0
1954	26 000	17 000	10 000	53.8	34.2	19.6	7.25	263.2	31.44
1955	27 000	17 000	10 000	53.8	33.8	20.0	7.25	259.6	31.92
1956	27 000	17 000	10 000	53.7	33.4	20.4	7.25	256.2	32.37
1957	27 000	17 000	11 000	53.8	33.0	20.8	7.25	252.1	32.86
1958	28 000	17 000	11 000	53.8	32.4	21.4	7.25	248.0	33.48
1959	28 000	17 000	12 000	53.8	31.9	21.9	7.25	243.9	34.07
1960	29 000	16 000	12 000	53.7	30.5	23.2	7.25	234.0	35.45
1961	29 000	16 000	13 000	53.5	29.2	24.3	7.25	225.0	36.82
1962	30 000	16 000	14 000	53.1	27.9	25.2	7.25	216.1	38.19
1963	30 000	15 000	15 000	52.8	26.8	26.0	7.26	207.9	39.42
1964	31 000	15 000	16 000	52.4	25.6	26.8	7.26	199.8	40.68
1965	31 000	15 000	16 000	52.0	24.5	27.5	7.27	191.9	41.89
1966	31 000	14 000	17 000	51.5	23.4	28.1	7.28	184.1	43.07
1967	32 000	14 000	18 000	51.0	22.3	28.7	7.28	176.5	44.29
1968	32 000	14 000	19 000	50.6	21.2	29.4	7.29	168.9	45.53
1969	33 000	13 000	20 000	50.2	20.2	30.0	7.29	161.3	46.68
1970	34 000	13 000	21 000	49.9	19.4	30.6	7.31	154.1	47.68
1971	34 000	13 000	22 000	49.8	18.4	31.4	7.35	146.8	48.93
1972	35 000	13 000	23 000	49.9	17.8	32.1	7.41	139.2	49.57
1973	37 000	12 000	24 000	50.1	16.9	33.3	7.50	132.0	50.86
1974	38 000	12 000	26 000	50.5	16.0	34.5	7.62	124.8	52.10
1975	40 000	12 000	29 000	51.6	15.2	36.4	7.75	117.5	53.30
1976	43 000	12 000	31 000	52.2	14.1	38.2	7.86	110.3	55.22
1977	45 000	12 000	34 000	52.8	13.4	39.4	7.94	103.4	56.26
1978	48 000	11 000	37 000	53.0	12.4	40.6	7.99	95.8	57.71
1979	51 000	11 000	40 000	53.2	11.5	41.7	8.04	88.6	59.15
1980	54 000	11 000	43 000	53.4	10.7	42.7	8.10	81.6	60.45
1981	57 000	11 000	46 000	53.2	9.9	43.3	8.13	74.9	61.65
1982	60 000	10 000	49 000	52.8	9.1	43.7	8.10	68.2	62.96
1983	62 000	10 000	52 000	51.9	8.3	43.6	8.02	62.1	64.22
1984	64 000	10 000	55 000	50.7	7.6	43.1	7.90	56.3	65.25
1985	66 000	9 000	57 000	49.3	7.0	42.4	7.76	51.1	66.27
1986	66 000	9 000	57 000	46.5	6.4	40.1	7.58	46.4	67.01
1987	66 000	9 000	58 000	43.8	5.8	38.0	7.37	42.1	67.89
1988	66 000	8 000	58 000	41.3	5.3	36.0	7.14	38.4	68.58
1989	66 000	8 000	58 000	38.8	4.9	33.9	6.87	35.0	69.16
1990	65 000	8 000	57 000	36.6	4.5	32.0	6.61	31.9	69.78
1991	65 000	8 000	57 000	34.6	4.3	30.3	6.34	29.1	70.19
1992	64 000	8 000	56 000	32.6	4.1	28.6	6.05	26.5	70.66
1993	64 000	8 000	56 000	30.9	3.8	27.0	5.76	24.2	71.17
1994	63 000	8 000	55 000	29.3	3.7	25.5	5.47	22.1	71.39
1995	61 000	8 000	54 000	28.2	3.5	24.6	5.19	20.3	71.99
1996	61 000	8 000	53 000	27.5	3.5	24.0	4.90	18.7	72.19
1997	60 000	8 000	53 000	26.8	3.4	23.4	4.62	17.3	72.42
1998	60 000	8 000	53 000	26.3	3.3	23.0	4.34	16.1	72.97
1999	60 000	8 000	52 000	25.8	3.2	22.5	4.13	15.0	73.18
2000	58 000	7 000	51 000	24.8	3.2	21.6	3.89	14.0	73.47
2001	57 000	7 000	50 000	24.0	3.1	21.0	3.69	13.1	73.81
2002	56 000	7 000	49 000	23.3	3.0	20.2	3.50	12.4	73.87
2003	55 000	7 000	48 000	22.7	3.0	19.8	3.35	11.8	74.14
2004	55 000	7 000	48 000	22.2	2.9	19.3	3.20	11.3	74.33
2005	54 000	7 000	46 000	21.4	2.9	18.5	3.05	10.9	74.40
2006	53 000	7 000	46 000	20.7	2.9	17.8	2.92	10.6	74.48
2007	53 000	8 000	46 000	20.5	3.0	17.6	2.81	10.6	74.46
2008	56 000	8 000	48 000	21.1	3.0	18.2	2.81	10.3	74.61
2009	60 000	8 000	52 000	22.3	3.0	19.3	2.84	10.1	74.68
2010	64 000	7 000	57 000	23.4	2.6	20.8	2.94	10.0	76.27
2011	70 000	8 000	62 000	22.6	2.5	20.2	2.94	9.9	76.61
2012	75 000	8 000	67 000	21.9	2.3	19.6	2.93	9.8	77.06
2013	81 000	9 000	72 000	21.6	2.3	19.3	2.95	9.7	77.25
2014	85 000	9 000	76 000	21.3	2.2	19.1	2.96	9.6	77.45
2015	88 000	9 000	79 000	21.3	2.2	19.1	2.96	9.6	77.69
2016	90 000	9 000	81 000	20.8	2.2	18.6	2.95	9.6	77.92
2017	92 000	10 000	82 000	20.3	2.2	18.1	2.94	9.5	77.92
2018	92 000	10 000	82 000	19.8	2.2	17.6	2.88	9.5	77.97
2019	90 000	10 000	80 000	19.3	2.2	17.1	2.78	9.5	78.00
2020	87 000	14 000	73 000	18.8	3.0	15.8	2.69	9.4	74.76
2021	83 000	17 000	66 000	18.4	3.8	14.6	2.62	9.3	72.54
^{1} CBR = crude birth rate (per 1000); CDR = crude death rate (per 1000); NC = natural change (per 1000); TFR = total fertility rate (number of children per woman); IMR = infant mortality rate per 1000 births

=== Fertility ===
Years	1925	1926	1927	1928	1929	1930	1931	1932	1933	1934
Total Fertility Rate in Oman	6.88	6.89	6.91	6.92	6.93	6.95	6.97	6.98	6.99	7.01

Years	1935	1936	1937	1938	1939	1940	1941	1942	1943	1944
Total Fertility Rate in Oman	7.03	7.04	7.05	7.07	7.09	7.10	7.11	7.13	7.15	7.16

Years	1945	1946	1947	1948	1949
Total Fertility Rate in Oman	7.18	7.19	7.20	7.22	7.24

=== Life expectancy at birth ===
Life expectancy in Oman since 1950

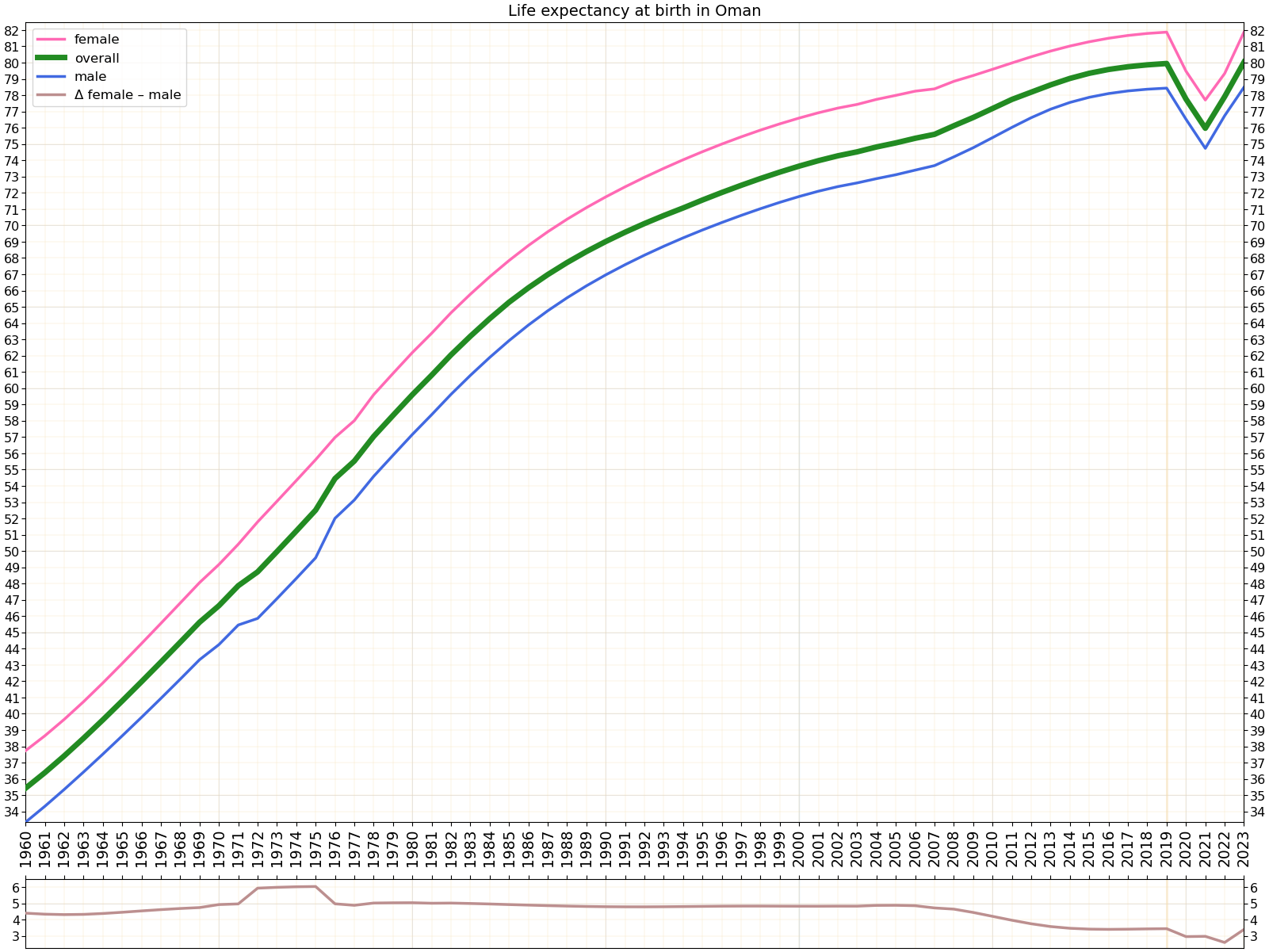
Life expectancy in Oman since 1960 by gender

total population: 75.7 years
male: 73.7 years
female: 77.7 years (2017 est)

== Ethnic groups ==
According to the CIA, Oman's population chiefly consists of Omani Arabs, with a small minority having Balochi (Al-Balushi) descent. South Asians (Indian, Pakistani, Sri Lankan, Bangladeshi) are common due to migrants and foreign workers, with an African and Afro-Arab minority.

Parts of Asia and Africa were once part of Oman.

Omani society is largely tribal. Oman has three known types of identities. Two of these identities are 'tribalism' and 'Ibadism'; the third identity is linked to 'maritime trade'. The first two identities are widespread in the interior of Oman; these identities are closely tied to tradition, as a result of lengthy periods of isolation. The third identity, which pertains to Muscat and the coastal areas of Oman, is an identity that has become embodied in business and trade. The third identity is generally seen to be more open and tolerant towards others. Thus, tension between socio-cultural groups in Omani society exists. More important is the existence of social inequality between these three groups. Gwadar, a region of Balochistan in Pakistan, was a Colony of Oman for more than a century. In 1958, Pakistan bought Gwadar from Oman for US$22.4 million, and hence many Omanis have Baloch descent.

== Languages ==
Languages commonly spoken in Oman include Arabic (official), Bangla, English, Hindi, Malayalam, Balochi, Swahili, Urdu, Sindhi, Gujarati, Jadgali, Achomi, Shehri, Tamil and other Indian languages

== Religion ==
The religious affiliations in Oman in 2021 according to the CIA World Factbook were Islam 85.9%, Christianity 6.5%, Hindu 5.5%, Buddhist 0.8%, Other 1%, Unaffiliated 0.2%.

Omani citizens are predominantly Muslim. Proportionally 47% are Sunni Muslims, 35% are Ibadi Muslims and 6% Shia Muslims.

== Migration ==
=== Immigration ===
Because of the combination of a relatively small local Omani population and a fast-growing oil-driven economy, Oman has attracted many migrants. At the 2014 census the total immigrant population was 1,789,000 or 43.7% of the population. Most migrants are males from India (465,660 for both sexes), Bangladesh (107,125) or Pakistan (84,658). Female migrant workers are mainly from Indonesia (25,300), the Philippines (15,651) or Sri Lanka (10,178). Migrants from Arab countries account for 68,986 migrants (Egypt 29,877, Jordan 7,403, Sudan 6,867, UAE 6,426, Iraq 4,159, Saudi Arabia 725, Bahrain 388, Qatar 168, other 12,683) and other Asian countries for 12,939 migrants. There were 8,541 migrants from Europe, 1,540 from the United States and 15,565 from other countries.

=== Emigration ===
Today several thousand Omani-born people have emigrated abroad. The figures are shown below (only countries with more than 100 Omani-born residents are listed).

Country	Omani population
United Kingdom	2,024
United States	390
Canada	260
Australia	148
Japan	24

=== Foreign residents ===
The Gulf Labour Markets and Migration Research Centre established that 45% of the population had a foreign background in 2017.

Foreign population in Oman (2017)
Rank	Country	Population
1	India	1,375,667
2	Bangladesh	718,856
3	Pakistan	268,868
4	Egypt	46,970
5	Philippines	45,213
6	Uganda	20,886
7	Sri Lanka	20,003
8	Tanzania	17,077
9	Nepal	16,580
10	Indonesia	14,155
11	Ethiopia	13,572
Total non-Omanis		2,054,594

== See also ==
- Freedom of religion in Oman
- Religion in Oman
- Islam in Oman
