= Religion in Oman =

Religion of Omani citizens
1. Ibadi Islam (45%)
2. Sunni Islam (45%)
3. Shia Islam (5%)
4. Other religion (Christianity, Hinduism, Buddhism) (5%)

The government of Oman does not keep statistics on religious affiliation. According to the CIA World Factbook, as of 2020, Muslims are in the majority at 85.9%, with Christians at 6.4%, Hindu at 5.7%, and other religious affiliations and unaffiliated at 2%. Oman is considered the centre for the Ibadi denomination of Islam.

== Islam ==
Around 95.9% of Oman's population is Muslim, of which 45% follow Ibadism. An estimate recorded around 45% following Sunni Islam while the other 5% identifying as Shia Muslims. The rest are of other faiths, such as Hinduism or Christianity.

== Other religions ==
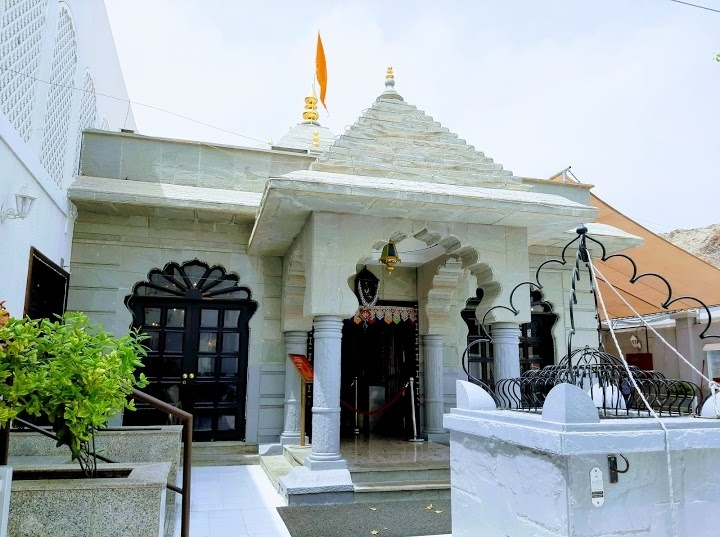
The Shiva temple in Old Muscat is one of the oldest Hindu temples in the Middle East.

Virtually all non-Muslims in Oman are foreign workers.

Oman has communities of Indian Hindu residents. Muscat has two Hindu temples. One of them is over a hundred years old. There is a significant Sikh community in Oman. Though there are no permanent gurdwaras, many smaller ones in makeshift camps exist and are recognised by the government. The Government of India had signed an accord in 2008 with the Omani government to build a permanent gurdwara but as of now, little progress has been made.

Christian communities are centered in the major urban areas of Muscat, Sohar and Salalah. These include Catholic, Eastern Orthodox and various Protestant congregations, organized along linguistic and ethnic lines. More than 50 different Christian groups, fellowships and assemblies are active in the Muscat metropolitan area, formed by migrant workers from Southeast Asia.

== Freedom of religion ==
In 2023, the country was scored 2 out of 4 for religious freedom.

In the same year, it was ranked as the 47th worst place in the world to be a Christian.

== See also ==
- Demographics of Oman
- Freedom of religion in Oman
- Islam in Oman
- Hinduism in Oman
- Christianity in Oman
- History of the Jews in Oman
