= Islam in Oman =

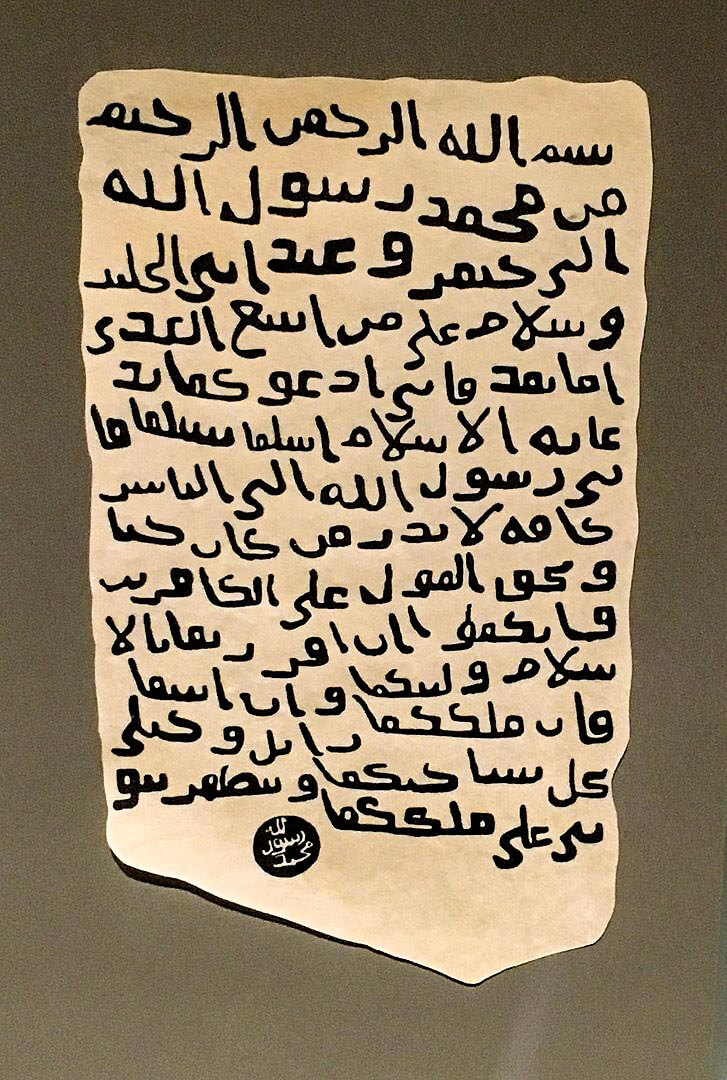
Prophet's Letter to the Dual Kings of Oman

Islam is the state religion in Oman, introduced during the lifetime of the Islamic prophet Muhammad in the early 7th century. Muhammad appointed Amr ibn al-As as governor, who remained until Muhammad's death in 632 CE. Amr and Sa'id ibn Aws al-Ansari delivered Muhammad's letter to the Al-Julanda brothers, the rulers of Oman, inviting them to embrace Islam. This peaceful mission marked the beginning of Islam in Oman. Today, 95% of Oman's population is Muslim, with 45% Sunni, 45% Ibadi, and 5% Shia.

== History ==
Islam spread peacefully in Oman during the early 7th century, initiated by Muhammad. Oman initially followed Sunni Islam, influenced by the teachings of Amr ibn al-As. The Ibaadi denomination, a branch of the Khawarij, established itself in Oman after fleeing Basra in modern-day Iraq. The first Ibaadi state was established in Oman in 750 CE during the transitional period following the fall of the Umayyad Caliphate but fell to the Abbasid Caliphate in 752 CE. Another Ibadi state emerged in 793 CE, lasting until the Abbasid recapture in 893 CE. Subsequent centuries saw the re-establishment of Ibadi imamates in the modern era, and Ibadis remain in Oman, including the current royal family, which overthrew the Ibadi imamate.

== Denominations ==
Islam in Oman
1. Ibadism (47.4%)
2. Sunni Islam (47.4%)
3. Shia Islam (5.26%)

=== Ibadism ===
==== Introduction to Oman ====
Ibadism, named after its founder Abdallah ibn Ibad, a major head of the Khawarij, traces its roots back to the early Kharijite movement. This sect emerged after the Battle of Siffin in 657 CE. Arriving in Oman around 700 CE, the Ibadis were initially part of the Kharijite group but gradually distinguished themselves by adopting more moderate views compared to other Kharijite factions.

==== Settlement and expansion in Oman ====
After the death of Abdallah ibn Ibad of Banu Tamim in 700 CE, the Ibadis scattered, with some settling in Oman and others in parts of the Maghreb al-Arabi (Northwest Africa). In Oman, they found a conducive environment for their beliefs among the local tribes who were receptive to their message of piety and egalitarianism. By 750 CE, the Ibadis established their first state in Oman, although it was short-lived and fell to the Abbasid Caliphate in 752 CE.

Despite this setback, the Ibadis continued to grow in influence by forming alliances with local tribes and promoting the idea that they were the true representatives of the Omani people, in contrast to the Abbasids who they deemed as foreign oppressors. In 793 CE, another Ibadi state emerged in Oman, lasting until the Abbasid recapture in 893 CE. Even after the Abbasid reconquests, Ibadi imams maintained considerable power and influence in the region. Over subsequent centuries, Ibadism became deeply entrenched in Omani society, leading to the re-establishment of Ibadi imamates in the late modern period.

==== How Ibadis became the ruling sect ====
The Ibadis managed to become the ruling sect in Oman despite not being the majority initially due to their strong organizational structure and ability to mobilize the local tribes. They skillfully portrayed the Abbasids as foreign oppressors and themselves as the indigenous defenders of Omani identity and autonomy. This narrative resonated with many Omanis, allowing the Ibadis to gain significant support. Over time, they established a series of imamate systems, where the imam held both religious and political authority. However, the persistent power of the Ibadi imamate was challenged in the mid-20th century. The conflict culminated in the Jebel Akhdar War (1954–1959), where the Sultanate of Muscat, aided by British forces, fought against the Ibadi imamate. The war ended with the defeat of the imamate and solidified the Sultanate's control over the entire country. This victory marked the end of the Ibadi imamate as a political entity and paved the way for the current Omani monarchy, which emerged from these historical roots.

==== Modern Ibadi reform under the Sultanate ====
Under the current Omani sultanate, Ibadism has undergone significant reforms to adapt to the changing political and social landscape. The establishment of the Sultanate of Oman in the mid-18th century marked a pivotal shift from the traditional Ibadi imamate system to a hereditary monarchy. This transition was significantly influenced by internal conflicts and external support, particularly from the British.

Religious tolerance has been another hallmark of these reforms. The sultanate promotes an inclusive approach, allowing various religious communities to practice their faith openly. This approach contrasts with the historical Ibadi practice of Bara'ah, which involved disassociating from those considered sinful or deviant, including some companions of Muhammad, particularly Uthman ibn Affan and Ali ibn Abi Talib. Historically, Ibadi texts have criticized and denounced these figures.

Sunni Islam is practiced by around 47% of Oman's Muslim population.[1] Sunni communities are predominantly concentrated in the Musandam Governorate, Al Batinah North Governorate, and Al Buraimi Governorate, where Sunni practices have largely been retained since the time of Amr ibn al-As. Sunni communities are also present in parts of Al Wusta Governorate and Dhofar.

=== Sunnism ===
Sunni Islam is practiced by around 47% of Oman's Muslim population. The Omani Sunnis in Oman are predominantly located in the Al Batinah North Governorate, Al Buraimi Governorate, Musandam Governorate, and Dhofar Governorate, which have largely retained their Sunni practices from the time of Amr ibn al-As. Sunni communities are also present in parts of the Al Wusta Governorate. Sunni Islam in Oman includes various schools of thought, with the Shafi'i school being particularly prominent in the Musandam, Buraimi, and Al Batinah North and South governorates. The increase in the Sunni Muslim population is also helped by migrants from India, Pakistan, and Bangladesh.

=== Shi'ism ===
The Shi'as live along Al Batinah and Muscat coasts. There are at least seven Twelver Shia mosques in Muscat. In November, 2022 the largest Shia mosque in the country has been opened in Muscat. It has been built on a 30,000 square meter plot of land and with its building area measuring 12,820 square meters. The construction was ordered by the Ministry of Endowments and Religious Affairs (Oman) and inauguration was attended by Mohammed bin Said bin Khalfan Al Mamari, its minister.

== See also ==
- Freedom of religion in Oman
- Demographics of Oman
