= Freedom of religion in Oman =

The Basic Law, in accordance with tradition, declares that Islam is the state religion and that Shari'a is the source of legislation. It also prohibits discrimination based on religion and provides for the freedom to practice religious rites as long as doing so does not disrupt public order. The government generally respected this right, but within defined parameters that placed limitations on the right in practice. While the government continued to protect the free practice of religion in general, it formalized previously unwritten prohibitions on religious gatherings in locations other than government-approved houses of worship, and on non-Islamic institutions issuing publications within their communities, without prior approval from the Ministry of Endowments and Religious Affairs (MERA). There were no reports of societal abuses or discrimination based on religious belief or practice.

In 2023, the country was scored 2 out of 4 for religious freedom.

== Religious demography ==
The country has an area of 310,000 square kilometres (120,000 sq mi) and a population of 2.5 million, of whom 1.9 million are citizens. The government does not keep official statistics on religious affiliation. In 2023, an estimated percentage of 47.2% of Omani Muslims were Sunni Muslims and 35.2% were Ibadi Muslims while only 6.5% were Shia Muslims.

There are small communities of 5% ethnically Indian Hindus and Christians that have been naturalized. Ibadism historically has been Oman's dominant religious sect, and the Sultan is a member of the Ibadi community. The government, however, does not give official preference to any particular religious group.

Non-Ibadi and non-Sunni religious communities individually constitute less than 7 percent of the population and include, Hindus, Buddhists, Sikhs, and Christians. Christian communities are centered in the major urban areas of Muscat, Sohar, and Salalah and are represented by Roman Catholic, Eastern Orthodox, and various Protestant congregations. These groups tend to organize along linguistic and ethnic lines. More than 50 different Christian groups, fellowships, and assemblies are active in the Muscat metropolitan area. Shi'a Muslims are a small but well-integrated minority, concentrated in the capital area and along the northern coast. The majority of non-Muslims, however, are noncitizen immigrant workers from South Asia. There are also communities of ethnic Indian Hindus. Muscat has two Hindu temples. One of them is over a hundred years old. There is also a significant Sikh community in Oman. Though there are no permanent gurudwaras, many smaller gurudwaras in makeshift camps exist and are recognised by the government. The government of India had signed an accord in 2008 with the Omani government to build a permanent gurudwara but little progress has been made on the matter.

== Status of religious freedom ==
=== Legal and policy framework ===
The Basic Law declares that Islam is the state religion and that Shari'a (Islamic law) is the source of legislation. It also prohibits discrimination against individuals on the basis of religion or religious identity and provides for the freedom to practice religious rites so long as doing so does not disrupt public order. In May 2006 the MERA issued a circular to non-Muslim religious leaders and diplomatic missions, reaffirming the individual's right to practice his or her own religious activities according to his or her values, customs, and traditions; however, the circular informed them that gatherings of a religious nature are not allowed in private homes or any other locations except government-approved houses of worship. The circular, which formalized existing, but unwritten, government policy, also prohibits non-Islamic institutions from issuing publications within their communities without prior ministerial approval.

All religious organizations must be registered and licensed by the MERA. The Ministry recognizes the Protestant Church of Oman, the Catholic Diocese of Oman, the al Amana Center (interdenominational Christian), the Hindu Mahajan Association, and the Anwar al-Ghubaira Trading Company in Muscat (Sikh) as the official sponsors for non-Islamic religious communities. Groups seeking licensure must request meeting and worship space from one of these sponsor organizations, which are responsible for recording the group's doctrinal adherence, the names of its leaders, and the number of active members and submitting this information to the Ministry. Members of non-Islamic communities were free to maintain links with fellow adherents abroad and undertake foreign travel for religious purposes. The government permitted clergy from abroad to enter the country, under the sponsorship of licensed religious organizations, for the purposes of teaching or leading worship.

Officials at the MERA claim that there is no limit on the number of groups that can be licensed. New religious groups unaffiliated with one of the main communities must gain ministerial approval before receiving a license. While the government has not published the rules, regulations, or criteria for approval, the Ministry generally considers the group's size, theology or belief system, and availability of other worship opportunities before granting approval. The Ministry employs similar criteria before granting approval for new Muslim groups to form. According to government regulations, mosques must be built at least 1 kilometer apart and only on government-owned land.

Religious leaders of all faiths must be licensed with the MERA. The Ministry has a formal licensing process for Muslim imams, however unlicensed lay members are not prohibited from leading prayers in mosques. Lay members of non-Islamic communities may lead worship if they are specified as leaders in their group's licensing application. Foreigners on tourist visas are prohibited from preaching, teaching, or leading worship.

Apostasy is not a criminal offense under Omani law. Citizens who convert from Islam to another faith, however, generally face problems under Oman's Personal Status and Family Legal Code, which specifically prohibits a father who leaves the Islamic faith from retaining paternal rights over his children. The law does not prohibit proselytizing, but the MERA will stop individuals or groups from engaging in it if the Ministry receives complaints. The government uses immigration regulations and laws against harassment to enforce the Ministry's policy. Article 209 of the Penal Code assigns a prison sentence and fine to anyone who publicly blasphemes God or His prophets, commits an affront to religions and faiths by spoken or written word, or breaches the peace of a lawful religious gathering; this could be used to limit religious expression. However, there were no reports of any prosecutions under this statute during the reporting period. The Ministry reviews all imported religious material for approval.

Laws governing family and personal status are adjudicated by Oman's civil courts, according to the Personal Status and Family Legal Code, which is based on the principles of Shari'a. Some aspects of the code discriminate against women, particularly by favoring male heirs in adjudicating inheritance claims. While there was continuing reluctance to take an inheritance dispute to court, for fear of alienating the family, women increasingly were aware of, and took steps to protect and exercise, their rights as citizens. Article 282 of the code exempts non-Muslims from the code's provisions, allowing them to follow their own religious rules pertaining to family or personal status.

Instruction in Islam is mandatory in the basic curriculum in all public school grades K-12. Non-Muslim students are allowed to opt out of the public school system and attend private schools that do not offer instruction in Islam. Non-Muslim members of the military are also exempt from otherwise mandatory Islamic studies. Military bases maintain at least one mosque and one imam for the convenience of military personnel. Training facilities dedicate approximately three sessions per week for the study of Islamic subjects. While non-Muslim members of the military were not prohibited from practicing their own religion, the military did not provide them with alternative places of worship on base.

The government sponsored fora for examining differing interpretations of Islam, and government-sponsored interfaith dialogues took place on a regular basis. Private groups that promote interfaith dialogue were permitted to exist, as long as discussions did not constitute an attempt to cause Muslims to recant their Islamic beliefs. During the reporting period, the MERA hosted several Christian and Muslim scholars and lecturers of various schools of thought to discuss interfaith relations and tolerance in Islamic traditions.

The Islamic holy days of Eid al-Adha, Islamic (Hijra) New Year, the Birth of the Prophet Muhammad, Ascension Day, and Eid al-Fitr are national holidays.

=== Restrictions on religious freedom ===
While the government generally respected the freedom of religion, some government procedures and policies placed limitations on religious practice.

The prohibition on group worship in private homes or other locations limited the ability of some adherents who were physically distant from those locations or who lacked reliable transportation to practice their faith collectively. There were reports that government officials monitored and stopped several small groups from meeting in unsanctioned locations during the reporting period. On the whole, churches and temples voluntarily abided by the May 2006 circular, taking steps to enforce the prohibitions among groups under their sponsorship and provide space on their compounds for worship; however, the lack of sufficient space in the existing locations sanctioned by the government for collective worship, as well as long waiting lists for use of these facilities, effectively limited the number of groups that could operate.

The MERA approved a limited number of "church visas" to professional clergy of non-Islamic congregations. Some leaders in these congregations claimed, however, that the number of approved clergy was insufficient to handle the demand for worship and therefore limited the natural growth of these congregations.

The MERA monitored sermons at mosques to ensure that imams did not discuss political topics. The government expected all imams to preach sermons within the parameters of standardized texts distributed monthly by the Ministry. While the MERA did not control the content of sermons in non-Islamic communities, groups were prohibited from issuing any publications without obtaining the Ministry's prior approval.

There were no reports of religious prisoners or detainees in the country.

=== Forced religious conversion ===
There were no reports of forced religious conversion, including of minor U.S. citizens who had been abducted or illegally removed from the United States, or of the refusal to allow such citizens to be returned to the United States.

=== Improvements and positive developments in respect for religious freedom ===
During the reporting period, the MERA met with visiting leaders of some non-Islamic faiths regarding the state of their communities in Oman and discussed the possibility of allowing groups to establish new places of worship in other metropolitan areas. The Ministry provided an additional 10,000 square meters of space to one of the Christian compounds in Muscat to facilitate its expansion, which could help ease space constraints that limit religious practice.

== Societal abuses and discrimination ==
There were no reports of societal abuses or discrimination based on religious belief or practice.

== See also ==
- Religion in Oman
- Islam in Oman
- Hinduism in Oman
- Human rights in Oman
