= Ministry of Awqaf =

The Ministry of Awqaf or Ministry of Endowments is a government ministry responsible for managing Islamic religious affairs and awqaf, Islamic charitable endowments.

- Ministry of Awqaf (Egypt)
- Ministry of Islamic Affairs (Kuwait)
- Ministry of Endowments and Religious Affairs (Oman)
- Ministry of Awqaf and Religious Affairs (Palestine)
- Ministry of Awqaf and Islamic Affairs (Qatar)
- Ministry of Endowments (Syria)

== See also ==
- Ministry of religious affairs
