= Maa Balsundari =

Temple in Kashipur, India

Coordinates: 29.20°N 78.98°E

Bal Sundari Mandir, also known as Chaiti Mandir, is a temple located in Kashipur. During Navratras in March a grand fair is held here every year. The fair draws thousands of pilgrims and devotees from far-flung areas.
