= Jaspur =

- Town
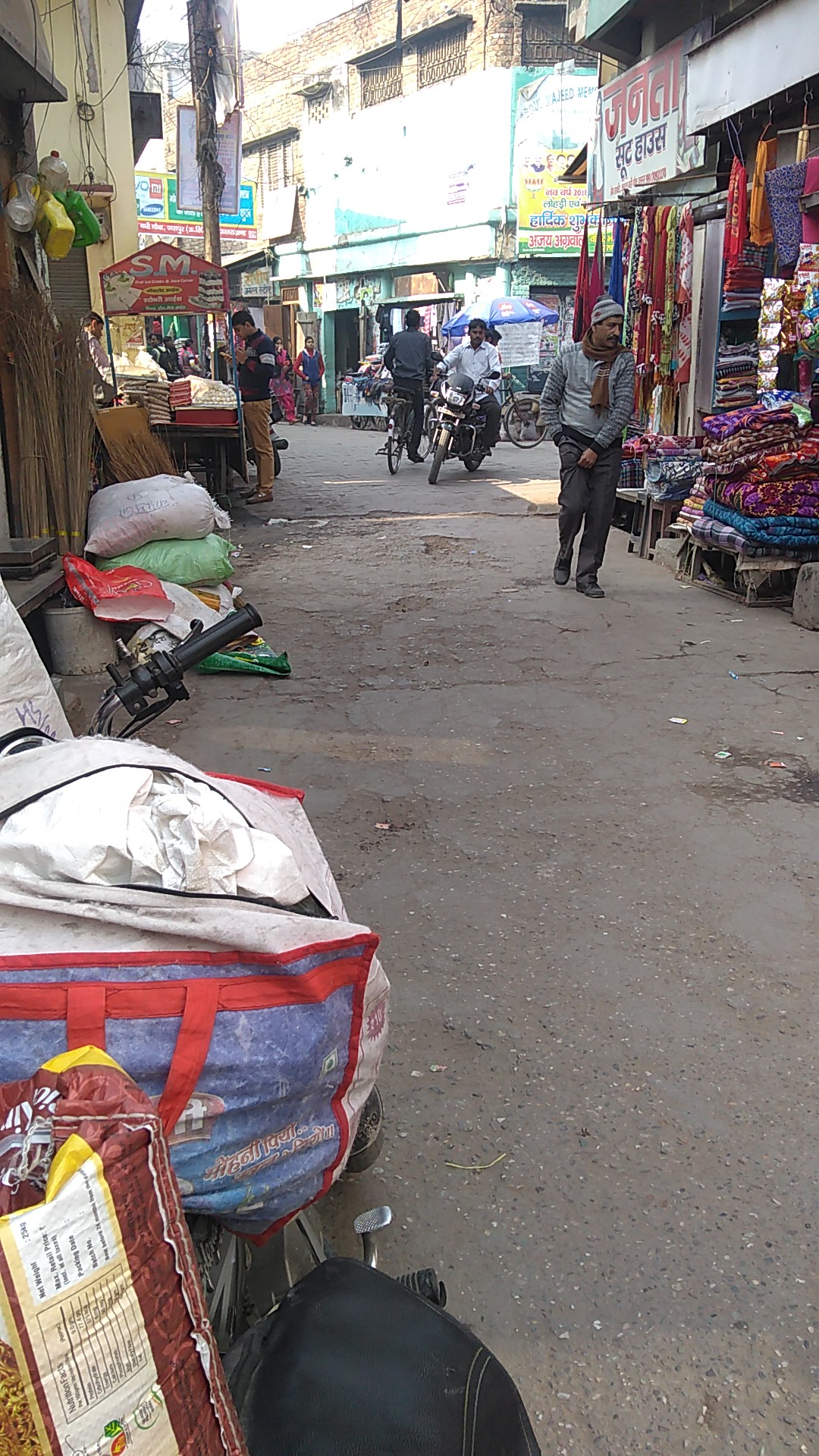
- Gahlot market in Jaspur

- Location in Uttarakhand, India Jaspur (India)
- Coordinates: 29.283331°N 78.816673°E
- Country: India
- State: Uttarakhand
- District: Udham Singh Nagar

Government
  - Type: Municipal council
- Elevation: 220 m (720 ft)

Population (2011)
  - Total: 50,523

Languages
  - Official: Hindi
  - Local: Khari Boli
- Time zone: UTC+5:30 (IST)
- PIN: 244712
- Vehicle registration: UK 18
- Website: uk.gov.in

Jaspur is a developing town and a municipal board in the Udham Singh Nagar district in the Indian state of Uttarakhand. It is located at 29.28°N 78.82°E, 18 km from Kashipur and 210 km east from New Delhi. It has an average elevation of 320m (1050ft), and is the border town of Uttarakhand.

== Demographics ==
According to the 2011 India census Jaspur has a population of 126,397, with 17% being under the age of 6. 52.37% of the population is male, and 47.63% is female. The average literacy rate is 60%, higher than the national average of 59.5%. Hindi is the most common spoken language.

== Transportation ==
NH-74 connects Haridwar in Uttarakhand with Bareilly in Uttar Pradesh via Pilibhit. It connects Jaspur to major cities including Haldwani, Kashipur, Gadarpur, Rudrapur, Kicha, Ramnagar, Haridwar, and Dehradun. The town a local bus stand, and the government bus station lies on the outskirts of the city.

== Economy ==
The economy of the city is mainly agriculture based. There is a sugar mill at Nandehi near the city, and multiple rice and paper mills in the surrounding area. Multiple small businesses sell products including automobiles, clothing, books, jewelry, hardware, paint, film and restaurants.

== 2011 Census Data ==
=== Literacy Demographics ===
	Total	Male	Female
Children (Age 0-6)	23,902	12,725	11,177
Literacy	73.59%	70.06%	55.79%
Scheduled Caste	27,962	14,685	13,277
Scheduled Tribe	29	14	15
Illiterate	62,576	26,682	35,894

=== Caste Demographics ===
	Total	Male	Female
Schedule Caste	27,962	14,685	13,277
Schedule Tribe	29	14	15

=== Religion Demographics ===
Religion	Total		Male	Female
Hindu	87,746	(51.52%)	46,131	41,615
Muslim	63,622	(37.36%)	33,155	30,467
Christian	233	(0.14%)	125	108
Sikh	18,595	(10.92%)	9,633	8,962
Buddhist	11	(0.01%)	9	2
Jain	16	(0.01%)	11	5
Other Religion	0	(0%)	0	0
No Religion Specified	92	(0.05%)	53	39

=== Urban/Rural Demographics ===
	Total	Urban	Rural
Population	170,315	57,849	112,466
Children (0 - 6 years)	23,902	8,121	15,781
Schedule Caste	27,962	4,055	23,907
Schedule Tribe	29	0	29
Literacy	73.59%	77.04%	71.81%
Sex Ratio	911	918	908

=== Working Population - Jaspur ===
	Total	Male	Female
Main Workers	46,094	38,761	7,333
Cultivators	10,948	9,981	967
Agriculture Labourer	11,751	9,439	2,312
Household Industries	2,399	1,028	1,371
Other Workers	20,996	18,313	2,683
Marginal Workers	15,822	7,959	7,863
Non Working	108,399	42,397	66,002
