= Hinduism in Arab States =

Hindus in the Middle East
Total population
- 3,062,645 (1.6% of population)

Regions with significant populations
- United Arab Emirates: 855,738 (2022)
- Saudi Arabia: 451,347 (2020)
- Kuwait: 425,950 (2020)
- Qatar: 422,118 (2022)
- Yemen: 297,103 (2022)
- Oman: 279,488 (2022)
- Bahrain: 165,706 (2020)

Religions
- Hinduism

Related ethnic groups
Buddhism in the Middle East, Sikhism, Christianity in the Middle East

Hindu communities have been established in several Arabian countries; most notably Qatar, UAE, Saudi Arabia & Bahrain The Hindu population in the middle east grew with the increasing migration of workers from South Asia (India, Nepal, Sri Lanka and Bangladesh). These Hindu communities remain deeply connected to their religious roots despite having being settled in the middle east for decades.

Hindu temples have been built in Bahrain, the United Arab Emirates, Yemen, and Oman.

== Demographics ==
Distribution of Hindus among the Middle Eastern countries
1. United Arab Emirates (32.2%)
2. Saudi Arabia (15.0%)
3. Kuwait (14.0%)
4. Qatar (11.0%)
5. Yemen (10.0%)
6. Oman (9.00%)
7. Bahrain (5.40%)
8. Turkey (3.00%)
9. Jordan (0.30%)
10. Lebanon (0.20%)

Hinduism by country in the Middle East
| Country | Population (2020E) | % of Hindus | Hindu total |
|---|---|---|---|
| United Arab Emirates | 9,869,000 | 10% | 986,900 |
| Saudi Arabia | 34,719,000 | 1.3% | 451,347 |
| Kuwait | 4,259,500 | 10% | 425,950 |
| Qatar | 2,113,000 | 15.9% | 335,967 |
| Yemen | 29,710,300 | 1% | 297,103 |
| Oman | 5,081,600 | 5.5% | 279,488 |
| Bahrain | 1,690,900 | 9.8% | 165,708 |
| Turkey | 84,339,067 | 0.1% | 84,340 |
| Jordan | 10,185,500 | 0.1% | 10,185 |
| Lebanon | 6,830,600 | 0.1% | 6,830 |
| Total | 197,438,267 | 1.6 | 3,062,645 |

== Egypt ==
There were about 2,700 Hindus in Egypt in 2010. That number decreased to about 1535 in 2020.

== Oman ==
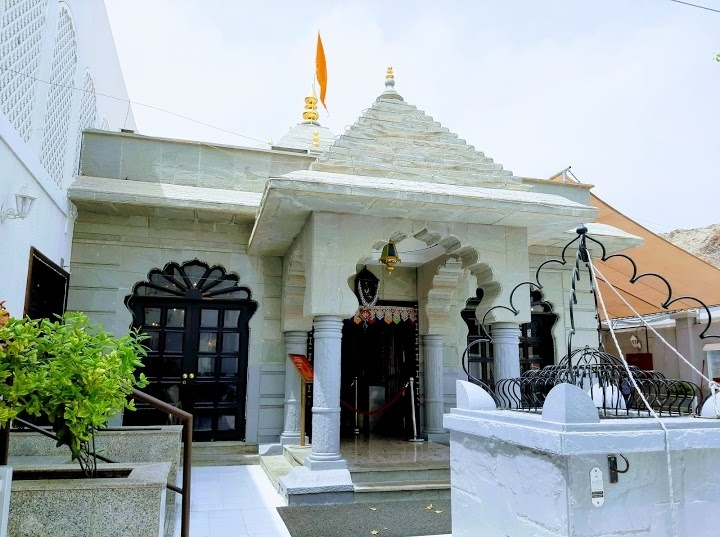
Motishwar temple in Old Muscat is one of the oldest Hindu temples in Middle East.

Oman has an immigrant Hindu minority. The number of Hindus has declined in the 20th century although it is now stable. Hinduism first came to Muscat in 1507 from Kutch. The original Hindus spoke Kutchi. By the early 19th century there were at least 4,000 Hindus in Oman, all of the intermediate merchant caste. By 1900, their numbers had plummeted to 300. In 1895, the Hindu colony in Muscat came under attack by the Ibadhis. By the time of independence, only a few dozen Hindus remained in Oman. The historical Hindu Quarters of al-Waljat and al-Banyan are no longer occupied by Hindus. The most prominent immigrant Hindus, are Visoomal Damodar Gandhi (Aulad Kara), Khimji Ramdas, Dhanji Morarji, Ratansi Purushottam and Purushottam Toprani. The only Hindu crematorium is located in Sohar, northwest of Muscat.

=== Temples ===
Hindu temples once located in Ma'bad al Banyan and Bayt al Pir no longer exist after the area's redevelopment in the mid-1970s. The only active Hindu temples today are the Shiva temple complex in Muscat (locally known as Motishwar Mandir), and the Krishna temple located in Darsait.

== Qatar ==
Hindus make up 15.9% of Qatar's population. There are an estimated 422,118 Hindus in the country. They primarily come from South Asia.

== United Arab Emirates ==
South Asians in the United Arab Emirates (UAE) constitute the largest ethnic group in the country. Over 2 million Indian migrants (mostly from south India) are estimated to be living in the UAE, constituting 28% of the total population of the Emirates as of 2017. However, not all of these migrants are Hindu with many Christians & Muslims also having settled in the middle east. The majority of Indian migrants to UAE are Muslim (50%), followed by Christians (25%) and Hindus (25%). The Hindu population in UAE is estimated to range from 6-10%.

=== Temples ===
In 1958, permission was given to build the Hindu Temple in Bur Dubai within a complex that included a Shiva Mandir, Krishna Mandir, and Gurudwara. In January 2024, a new Hindu Temple opened in Jebel Ali and the existing temples were moved to this new location. Krishan Mandir is still housed in the original complex in Bur Dubai.

Majority of Hindus living in UAE practice their religion within their homes. The new temple, BAPS Hindu Mandir Abu Dhabi, had its foundation stone ceremony in April 2019. The inauguration ceremony of the temple took place on 14 February 2024.

== Bahrain ==
Hinduism is followed by 8.33% of the population of Bahrain in 2025. Bahrain also hosts the Shrinathji Temple built 200 years ago and is one of the oldest Hindu temple in the Arab region.

== Yemen ==
There are about 200,000 Hindus in Yemen. They are from India and Nepal.

== Hindu temples ==
- BAPS Hindu Mandir Abu Dhabi, UAE
- Motishwar Mandir in Muscat, Oman
- Hindu Temple, Dubai, UAE
- Shrinathji Temple, Bahrain

== See also ==
- Hinduism by country
- Hinduism in Israel
- Buddhism in the Middle East
