= Kashipur, Uttarakhand =

City in Uttarakhand, India

Kashipur
- City
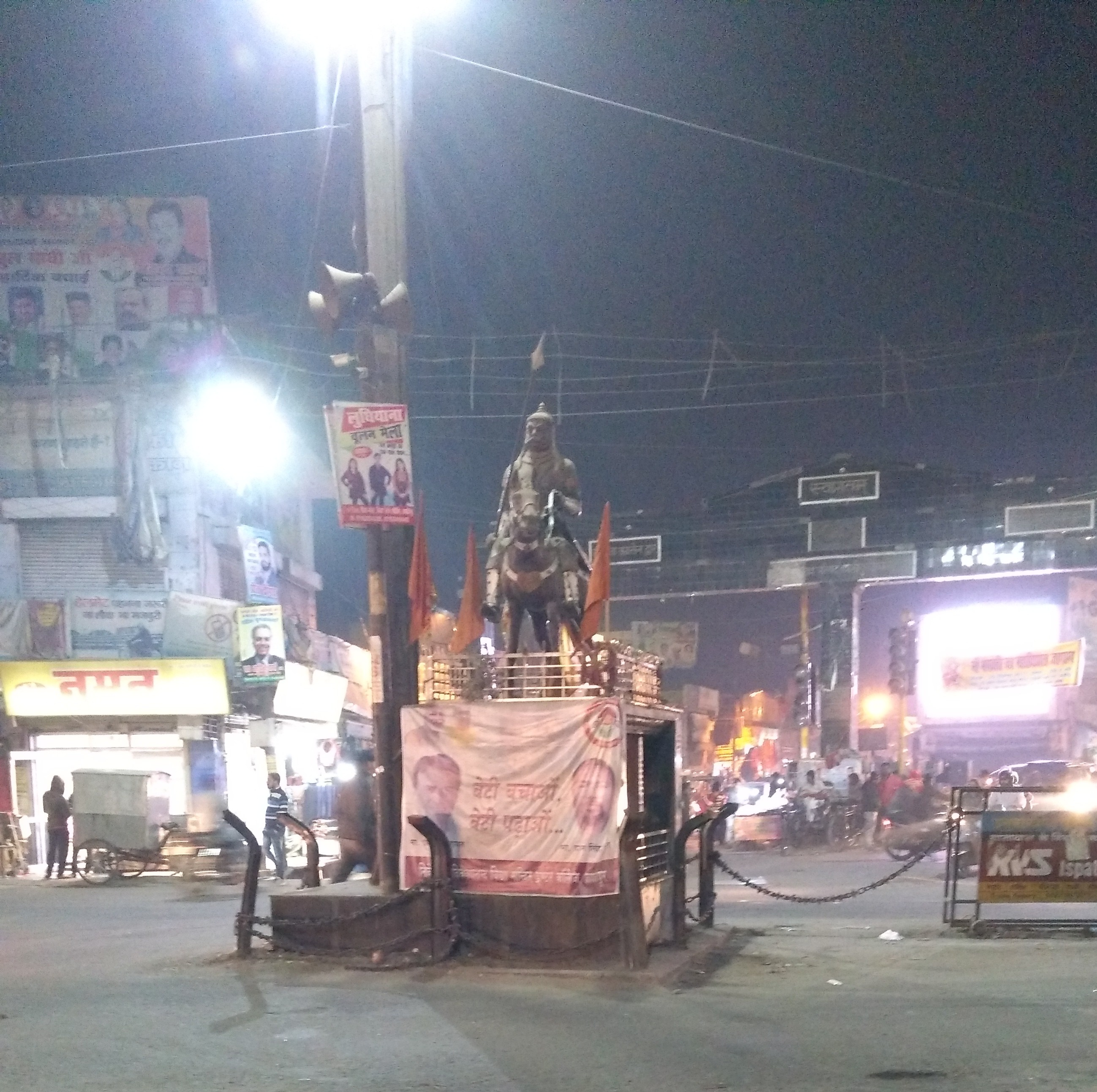
- Maharana Pratap Chowk, Main crossroad of Kashipur

- Location within India and Uttarakhand Kashipur (India)
- Coordinates: 29.22°N 78.95°E
- Country: India
- State: Uttarakhand
- District: Udham Singh Nagar
- Founded: 1639
- Municipality: 1872
- Founder: Kashinath Adhikari, an officer of King Devi Chand Kumaon
- Named for: Kashinath Adhikari

Government
  - Type: Municipal Corporation
  - Body: Kashipur Municipal Corporation
  - Mayor: Deepak Bali (BJP)
  - Lok Sabha MP: Ajay Bhatt (BJP)
  - MLA: Trilok Singh Cheema (BJP)

Area
  - Total: 5.4 km^{2} (2.1 sq mi)
- Elevation: 218 m (715 ft)

Population (2011)
  - Total: 121,623
  - Density: 23,000/km^{2} (58,000/sq mi)

Languages
  - Official: Hindi
  - Native: Buksa Kauravi
- Time zone: UTC+5:30 (IST)
- PIN: 244713
- Telephone code: +91-5947
- Vehicle registration: UK-18
- Sex ratio: 911 ♀/♂

Kashipur (Hindi: Kāshīpur [kaːʃiːpʊr]) is a city of Udham Singh Nagar district in the Indian state of Uttarakhand, and one of its seven subdivisions. Located in the western part of Udham Singh Nagar district, it is Kumaun's third most populous city and the sixth most populous in Uttarakhand. Its ancient name was "Govisana". According to the 2011 Census of India, the population is 121,623 for the city of Kashipur and 283,136 for Kashipur Tehsil. Kashipur also has IIM Kashipur, one of the thirteen Indian Institutes of Managements the government has set up during the Eleventh Five-year Plan.

Historically part of Kumaun, Kashipur is named after Kashinath Adhikari, the founder of the township and governor of the pargana, one of the officers of the Chand Kings of Kumaun in the 16th and 17th centuries. Kashipur remained under the rule of Chand Kings until the latter half of eighteenth century until Nand Ram, the then governor of Kashipur, became practically independent.

Kashipur was ceded to British in 1801, after which, it played a major role in the conquest of Kumaon during the Anglo-Gorkha war in 1815. After Kumaun was ceded to the British under the Treaty of Sugauli, Kashipur became the headquarters of Terai district in the Kumaon division. The Municipality of Kashipur was established in 1872, and was upgraded to a Municipal Corporation on 26 January 2013.

== Kashipur Kings ==
The rulers of Kashipur (Kumaon) belonged to the Rathore dynasty of Rajputs.

- Raja Mahendra Chand (Old Raja of Kumaon)
- Raja Lal Singh
- Raja Guman Singh (First Raja of Kashipur)
- Raja Shiv Raj Singh
- Raja Hari Raj Singh
- Raja Uday Raj Singh
- Raja Hari Chand Raj Singh (Again got the throne of Almora from his elder brother Raja Andand Singh)

== History ==
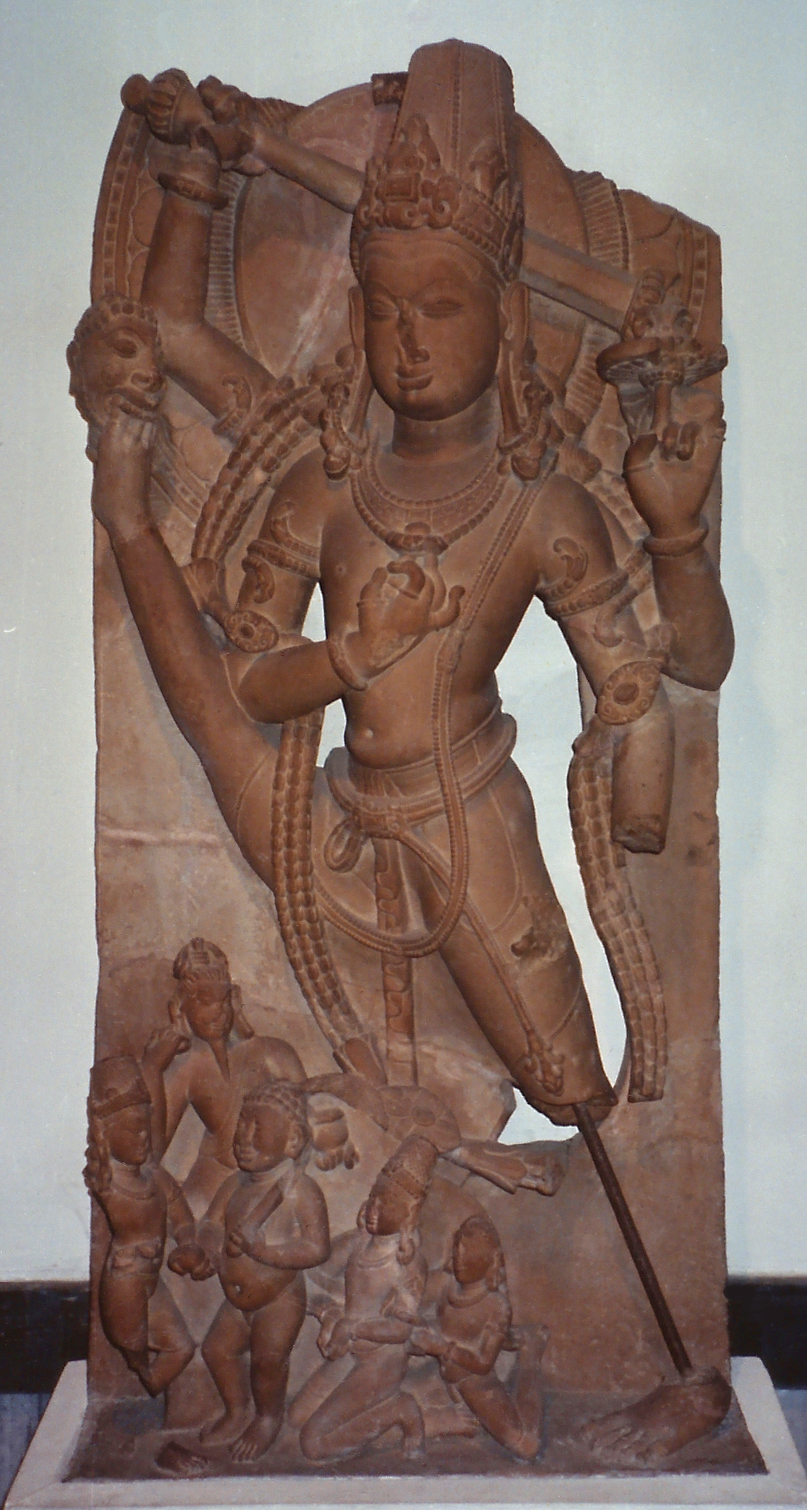
Vishnu Trivikrama, an 11th-century Pratihara stone sculpture from Kashipur

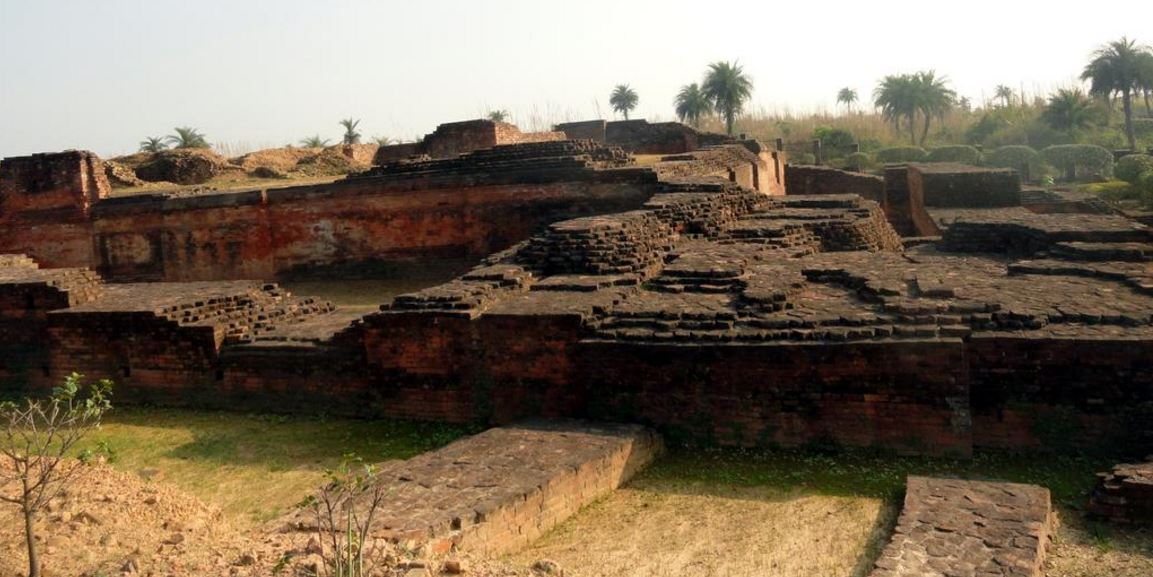
Ruins of the ancient city of Govisana

Kashipur was known as Govishana, during the time of Harsha (606–647 AD). The ruins of the large settlement of those days can be still seen near the city. The famous Chinese pilgrim Xuanzang also travelled the city in the 7th century. He described it as "The Capital was 15 li in circuit. Its position was lofty, and of difficult access, and it was surrounded by groves, tanks and fishponds". Kashipur is believed to have a good historic trade of clothes and metal vessels.

The modern town of Kashipur was founded by Kashinath Adhikari, the governor of Tarai under King Devi Chand of Champawat. Later Raja Mohan Chand; one of the Kings of Kumaon's younger brother Lal Singh was given the estate Kashipur and Raja Guman Singh became its first King. Kashipur's last king, Raja Hari Chand Raj Singh again got back the titular throne of Kumaon in British India, as Raja Anand Singh (Raja of Almora) had no issue. The exact date of the foundation of the town is disputed, several historians having expressed their own views on the matter. Bishop Heber, in his book Travels in India wrote that Kashipur was founded by a deity named Kashi 5000 years back (approx 3176 BC). Sir Alexander Cunningham invalidated his views in his book, The Ancient Geography of India, in which he wrote "the good bishop was grossly deceived by his informant, as it is well known that the town is a modern one, it having been built about AD 1718 by kashi-nath, a follower of Raja Devi-Chandra of Champawat in Kumaon". Badri Datt Pandey in his book Kumaun Ka Itihaas, contradicting Cunningham's views, claimed the town to be founded in 1639. Kashipur remained under the rule of Chand Kings until the latter half of eighteenth century, until Nand Ram, the governor of Kashipur, became practically Independent and established his kingdom at Kashipur.

When the British arrived in Kumaun at the end of the 18th century AD, Kashipur was ruled by King Shib Lal, the second King of Kashipur. Kashipur was ceded to the British by Shib Lal in 1801 after which it became a revenue division. Bishop Heber visited here during his travel to Almora in November 1824. Heber described Kashipur as a "famous place of Hindu Pilgrimage". On 10 July 1837, Kashipur was included in the Moradabad district. The revenue divisions of muradabad district were rearranged in 1944 following which Bajpur, Kashipur and Jaspur were rearranged into one pargana named as Kashipur. Bajpur was brought under Tarai district in 1859 followed by Kashipur in October 1870. Kashipur was later made the headquarters of Tarai district in the Ceded and Conquered Provinces.

== Geography ==
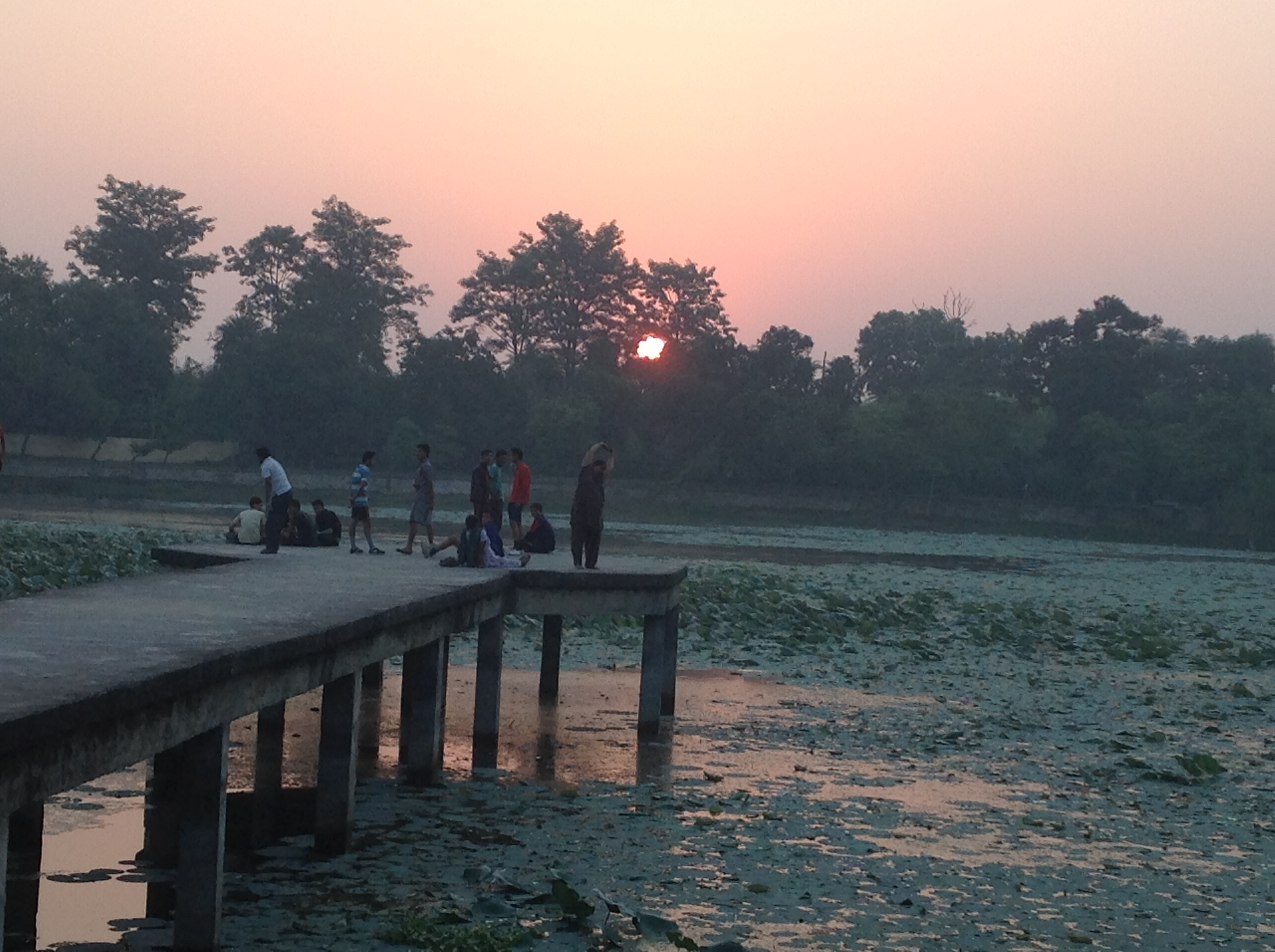
The Dronasagar Lake during sunrise

At 29.22°N 78.95°E, and 180 kilometres (110 mi) northwest of New Delhi, Kashipur is located in the south-west of the Kumaon region of Uttarakhand in the Terai – an area of relatively low-lying land, ranging between 500 and 1,000 feet (150 and 300 metres) above sea level and crossed by Kumaon's main north–south watershed between the basins of the Rivers Ramganga and Kosi. To the north of the city lies the Bhabar tract of Ramnagar, which separates the area from Shivalik Hills. Kashipur is drained only by minor rivers and lakes, primarily by Dhela river, a tributary of River Ramganga. Several rivers and stream cross the region transversely and leave their deposit making the land fertile. However, these also dissect the region which renders it unfit for agriculture. Kosi is the master stream flowing in the western part with its broad course from north to south.

== Climate ==
Kashipur has been ranked 19th best “National Clean Air City” under (Category 3 population under 3 lakhs cities) in India.

=== Geology ===
Geologically, Kashipur is dominated by the Terai tract, which runs horizontally through the city from Jaspur in the west, passing through the city center, to Bajpur and Rudrapur in the east. Terai formation consists of clays, sandy clays, fine to medium sand and occasional gravels. In this formation there is a dominance of clayey successions over sandy horizons. There are damp and marshy tracts in places. It is the zone of seepage where fine sand, silt and clay are deposited by the emerging streams. Almost level and fertile soil along with high water table has rendered the belt useful. According to the Bureau of Indian Standards, the town falls under seismic zone 4, in a scale of 2 to 5 (in order of increasing vulnerability to earthquakes).

=== Climate ===
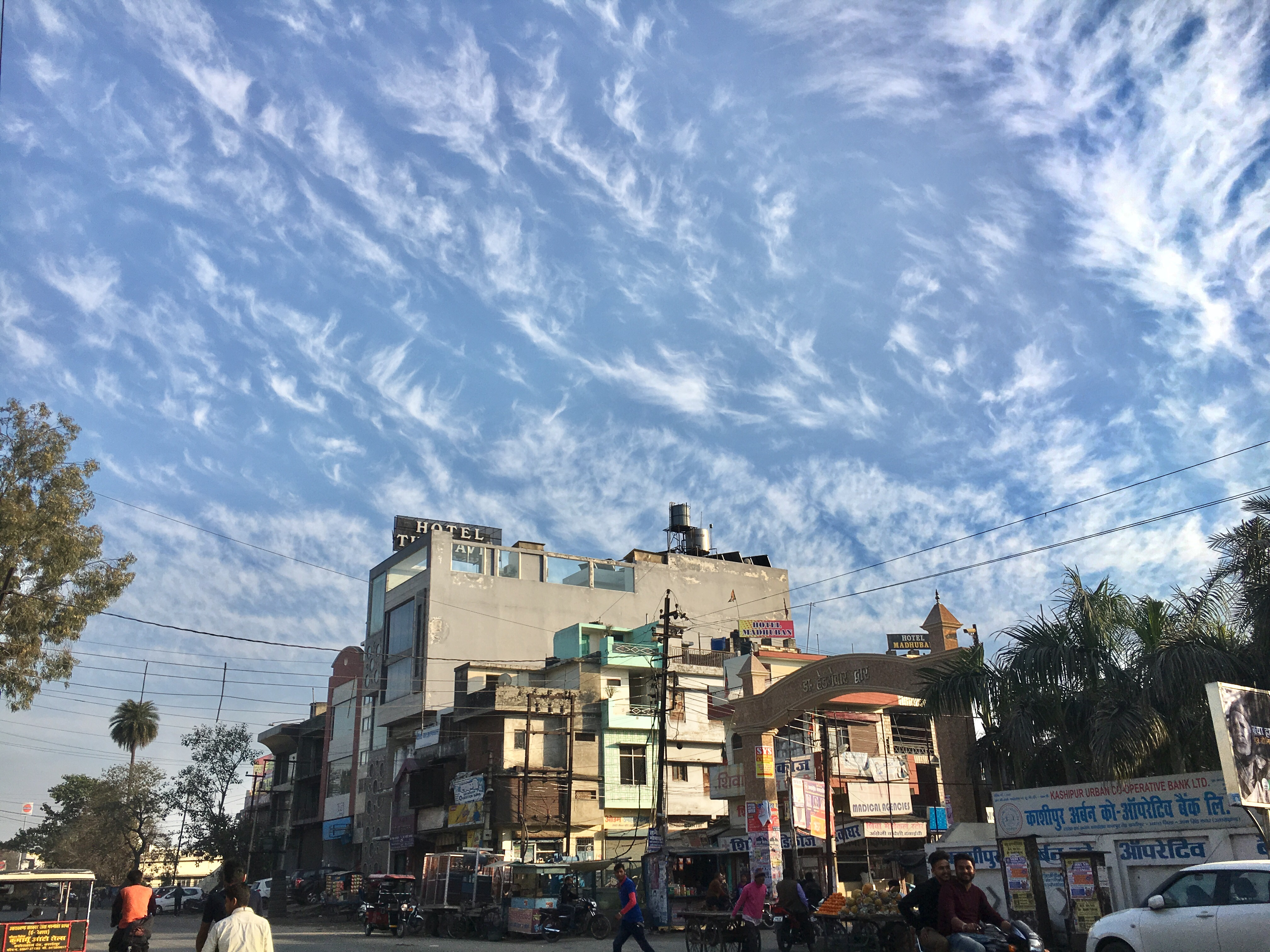
Clouds hovering over the city

Kashipur has a humid subtropical climate (Köppen: Cwa), like much of the Indo-Gangetic Plains to its south, with average maximum temperatures in summer (June) being around 31.6 °C (88.9 °F); and in winter (January) around 14.5 °C (58.1 °F). The driest month is November, with 5 mm of rain. With an average of 374 mm, the most precipitation falls in July. There is a difference of 369 mm of precipitation between the driest and wettest months. During the year, the average temperatures vary by 17.1 °C. The main seasons are summer from March to June, the monsoon season from July to November and winter from December to February.

The climate of Kashipur is characterized by relatively high temperatures and evenly distributed precipitation throughout the year. In summer, Kashipur is largely under the influence of moist, maritime airflow from the western side of the subtropical anticyclonic cells over low-latitude ocean waters. Temperatures are high and can lead to warm, oppressive nights. Summers are usually somewhat wetter than winters, with much of the rainfall coming from convectional thunderstorm activity; tropical cyclones also enhance warm-season rainfall in some regions. The coldest month is usually quite mild, although frosts are not uncommon, and winter precipitation is derived primarily from frontal cyclones along the polar front. But in the recent years kashipur has witnessed a drastic change in weather and its climatic conditions due to increase in construction in the nearby regions also due to overpopulation and increase in demand by people for the region's resources. due to this we have seen that the trees are cut due to which average temperature is increasing. also the most popular lake in the girital region has alao dried up.

Climate data for Kashipur
| Month | Jan | Feb | Mar | Apr | May | Jun | Jul | Aug | Sep | Oct | Nov | Dec | Year |
|---|---|---|---|---|---|---|---|---|---|---|---|---|---|
| Mean daily maximum °C (°F) | 20.8 (69.4) | 23.9 (75.0) | 29.5 (85.1) | 35.7 (96.3) | 39 (102) | 37.6 (99.7) | 32.7 (90.9) | 31.8 (89.2) | 32.1 (89.8) | 31 (88) | 26.8 (80.2) | 22.3 (72.1) | 30.3 (86.5) |
| Daily mean °C (°F) | 14.5 (58.1) | 16.9 (62.4) | 22 (72) | 27.5 (81.5) | 31.4 (88.5) | 31.6 (88.9) | 28.8 (83.8) | 28.2 (82.8) | 27.9 (82.2) | 24.7 (76.5) | 19.4 (66.9) | 15.4 (59.7) | 24.0 (75.3) |
| Mean daily minimum °C (°F) | 8.2 (46.8) | 9.9 (49.8) | 14.6 (58.3) | 19.4 (66.9) | 23.8 (74.8) | 25.7 (78.3) | 25 (77) | 24.6 (76.3) | 23.7 (74.7) | 18.4 (65.1) | 12 (54) | 8.6 (47.5) | 17.8 (64.1) |
| Average rainfall mm (inches) | 43 (1.7) | 28 (1.1) | 23 (0.9) | 6 (0.2) | 16 (0.6) | 108 (4.3) | 374 (14.7) | 368 (14.5) | 212 (8.3) | 89 (3.5) | 5 (0.2) | 9 (0.4) | 1,281 (50.4) |
Source: Climate-Data.org

== Demographics ==
Historical population
| Year | Pop. | ±% |
|---|---|---|
| 1871 | 13,113 | — |
| 1881 | 14,667 | +11.9% |
| 1891 | 14,717 | +0.3% |
| 1901 | 12,023 | −18.3% |
| 1911 | 12,773 | +6.2% |
| 1921 | 10,576 | −17.2% |
| 1931 | 11,276 | +6.6% |
| 1941 | 13,223 | +17.3% |
| 1951 | 16,597 | +25.5% |
| 1961 | 24,258 | +46.2% |
| 1971 | 33,457 | +37.9% |
| 1981 | 51,773 | +54.7% |
| 1991 | 69,870 | +35.0% |
| 2001 | 92,967 | +33.1% |
| 2011 | 121,623 | +30.8% |
Source: 1871, 1881 – The Imperial Gazetteer of India; 1891 – Kumaun Ka Itihaas by B.D. Pandey; 1901–2011 – District Census Handbook: Udham Singh Nagar

As per provisional data of 2011 census Kashipur had a population of 121,623 roughly equal to the nation of Kiribati, out of which males were 63,625 and females were 57,985. Since 2001, the population has grown by 28,656, or 30.8%. The population density is 57,693 inhabitants per square mile (22,275/km^{2}) compared to the 490 inhabitants per square mile (189/km^{2}) for Uttarakhand. In 1881, Kashipur had a population of around 14,000 people. By 1981, this had increased to 50,000.

Religion in Kashipur (2011)
| Religion |
| Hinduism | 62.37% |
| Islam | 35.06% |
| Sikhism | 1.87% |
| Christian | 0.34% |
| Others | 0.36% |

Hinduism is the major religion within Kashipur, with 62.37% of residents identifying as Hindus in the 2011 Census. The city's religious profile is highly diverse, Kashipur has a large number of people from Muslim, Sikh and Christian communities. Islam is second most popular religion in city of Kashipur with approximately 35.06% following it. In Kashipur city, Christianity is followed by 0.34%, Jainism by 0.11%, Sikhism by 1.87% and Buddhism by 1.87%. Approximately 0.25% of the population were either atheists or followed 'no particular religion'. The major language spoken in the city are Hindi and Kauravi

The Kashipur Tehsil had a population of 283,136 in 2011. In addition to Kashipur itself, the tehsil includes the towns of Mahua Kheraganj and Kachnal Gosain, along with 73 other villages.

== Government and politics ==
The Kashipur Municipal Corporation is in charge of the civic administration of the city. It was formed in 2013, by upgradation of the erstwhile Kashipur Municipal Council. The Municipality of Kashipur was constituted in 1872. Kashipur is divided into 40 wards for election purposes. The Kashipur Municipal Corporation is run by a city council composed of 40 Councillors, representing each of the wards of the city. Elections to the council are held once every five years, with results being decided by popular vote. Members contesting elections to the council usually represent one or more of the state's political parties. The mayor is also elected from among the elected members of the council. Elections to the Kashipur Municipal Corporation were held in 2025, and Deepak Bali, a BJP politician was voted into power. Bali defeated Sandeep Sehgal from Congress by 5158 votes.

== Economy ==
Agriculture is the main economic activity in the region. Fertile land, coupled with water availability, makes the region an intensively cropped area. Apart from Rice and Wheat, major produces are sugarcane, mango, guava, jamun, jack fruit and litchi. Large number of farmers in this region are actually settlers from outside, having land holdings in excess of five acres. government has allotted agricultural plots to refugees around Garhi Negi village and to the hill people at Maldhan village.

Historically, Industrial activities in the region were very small scale and agriculture based. Later, with administrative encouragement and support, rapid industrial development took place around Kashipur town. About 603 industrial units were functioning in the town, as reported by the Kashipur 2011 Master Plan. These included 163 Cottage industries, 415 small scale industries, and 25 medium (or large) Industries. Industrial development coupled with rich agricultural cash crops practices made this area more prosperous, relative to other parts of Kumaon region.

The region accounts for almost 50% of the medium and large scale industries in the district. Major Industrial units, mostly located on Kashipur-Thakurdwara road, include Surya Roshini Limited (Bulbs and Tubes), India Glycols limited, Kashi Vishwanath Steels limited, Jindal Solvents extraction limited, DSM Sugar mills limited, Naini Papers limited, SRF limited and Shriram extraction private limited etc. Large industrial houses such as Flexituff Ventures International Limited, IGL, HCL Technologies, Videocon, Pasupati Arcylon Limited etc. also have branch establishments in the city. Kashipur is becoming a thriving industrial center, as the city is suited for industrial park projects with cost of living compared to metros. Because of cheap and abundant raw materials available, several paper and sugar mills already have a presence in the city.

== Culture ==
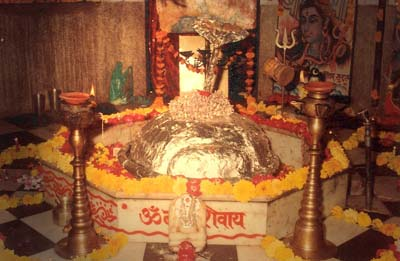
Shree Bheem Shankar Moteshwar Mahadev Mandir

=== Tourist attractions ===
Major tourist attractions in the city include:

- Drona Sagar Lake
- Shree Moteshwar Mahadev Mandir
- Maa Balsundari Mandir
- Chaiti Mela
- Gurudwara Shri Nankana Sahib
- Tumaria Dam
- Giri Sarovar
- Arya Samaj Mandir
- Shree Sai dham
- Maa mansa devi Mandir

== Transport ==
Kashipur is a major transport hub in Uttarakhand, acting as a gateway for the cities of Ranikhet, Pauri and Gairsain. The city is served by the National Highways NH 309 and NH 734. The NH 734 (formerly NH 74) connects to Najibabad via Jaspur and Nagina, while the NH 309 connects Kashipur to Rudrapur in the east, and the cities of Ramnagar and Srinagar to the north.

Pantnagar Airport (IATA: PGH, ICAO: VIPT), located 72 kilometres (45 mi) east of the city in the university town of Pantnagar, is the only major airport in the Kumaon region of Uttarakhand. It has a single runway, which is 4,500 feet (1,400 m) in length and is capable of handling a turboprop aircraft. Airline services exist to Delhi and Dehradun. The nearest international airport is the Indira Gandhi International Airport in New Delhi which is 214 kilometres (133 mi) away.

Kashipur Junction railway station (KPV) is connected to Ramnagar, Kathgodam, Moradabad, Bareilly, Lucknow, Kanpur, Varanasi, Mumbai, Chandigarh, Agra, Jaisalmer, Haridwar and Delhi by rail network. Kashipur Railway Station is under the administrative control of the Izzatnagar division of the North Eastern Railway zone of the Indian Railways which currently serves the city. Several new Rail links have been planned for the city. The Kashipur-Najibabad rail line has been surveyed by Indian Railways. This line would be used to connect Tanakpur with Dehradun. Another important line is the Ramnagar-Chaukhutia rail link, which will be critical in bringing Gairsain to the rail network.

Local public transport in Kashipur is co-ordinated by Uttarakhand Transport Corporation. Inter-City Bus routes are mainly operated from the Kashipur Bus Station by UTC, UPSRTC, K.M.O.U, though there are several other, smaller registered bus companies. Auto rickshaws serve during the fairs and fates in large numbers. E-Rickshaws, also known as Mini Metro, have now established themselves as the leading source of travelling within the city.

== Education ==
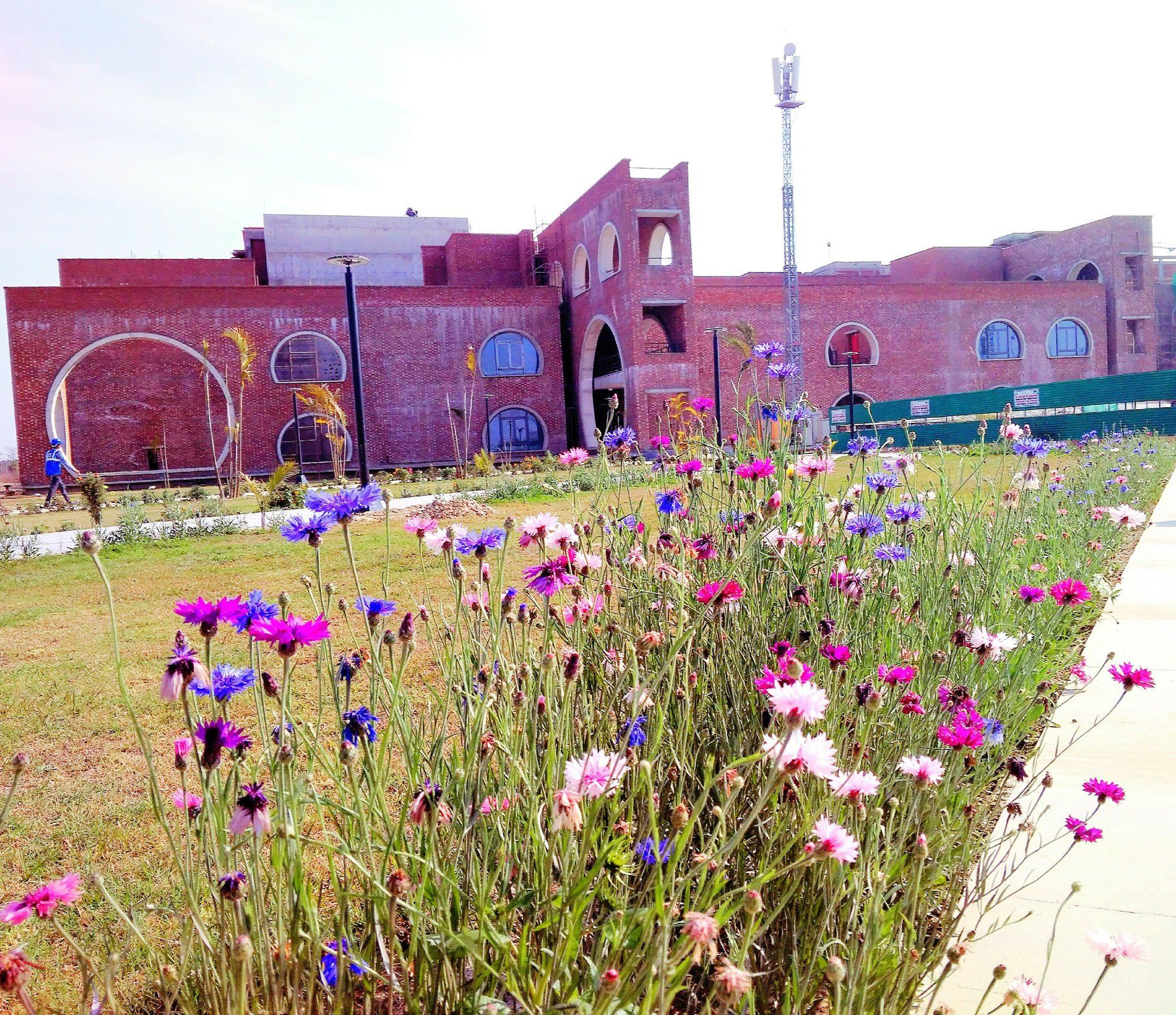
IIM Kashipur Campus

Kashipur is home to four colleges affiliated to the Kumaun University, Nainital: Radhey Hari Government P.G. College, Chandrawati Tewari Girls P. G. College, Sriram Institute of Management and Technology and Kashipur college of Education. The city also hosts the campus of Indian Institute of Management Kashipur.

The Indian Institute of Management Kashipur, also known as IIM Kashipur, is a public business school located in the Escorts Farm area of the city. It is one of the thirteen Indian Institutes of Managements the government has set up during the Eleventh Five-year Plan. The foundation stone was laid by the then HRD Minister Kapil Sibal on 29 April 2011.

As of 2011, Kashipur had a total of 88 Government financed educational institutions, consisting of 48 Primary Schools, 21 middle schools, 9 secondary schools, 9 senior secondary schools and 1 degree college. Schools in Kashipur are run by the state government or private organisations, many of which are religious. Hindi and English are the primary languages of instruction. Schools in Kashipur follow the "10+2+3" plan. After completing their secondary education, students typically enroll in Inter Colleges that have a higher secondary facility and are affiliated with the ICSE, the CBSE or the UBSE. They usually choose a focus on liberal arts, business, or science.

Major schools and colleges in Kashipur include Rajputana college, Master international school,Shemford Futuristic School, DAV Public School, Army Public School, Krishna Public Collegiate, Gyanarthi Media College, Delhi Public School, Guru Nanak Senior Secondary School, Kendriya vidyalaya, Chhauni Children's Academy, Little Scholars School, The Gurukul Foundation School, Maria Assumpta Convent School, Samar Study Hall, St. Mary School, Templeton College, Tularam Rajaram Saraswati Vidya Mandir Inter College, Vision Valley School, Udayraj Hindu Inter College and Roots Public School.

== See also ==
- Maa Balsundari, temple
- Moteshwar Mahadev, temple
