= Hinduism in Oman =

Hindus in Oman
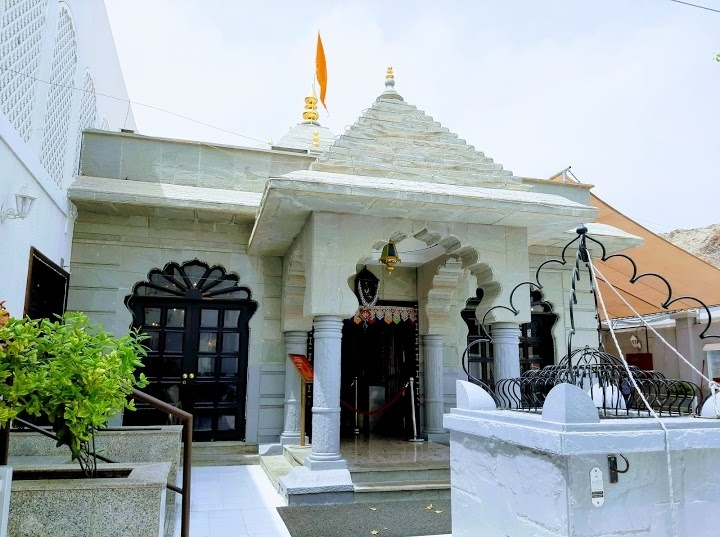
- Motishwar Mandir in Oman is one of the oldest Hindu temples in the Middle East.

Total population
- 259.780 (2020)▲; 5.5% of total population

Regions with significant populations
- Muscat

Religions
- Hinduism

Related ethnic groups
- Indians in Oman and Hindus

Hinduism is the second-largest religion in Oman, practised by 5.5% of its population.

== History ==
The cities of Sur, Sohar, Muttrah, and Muscat were home to Hindu trading communities, often accompanied by their families, as early as the 17th century. Historical records from Ibn Ruzaiq indicate that in 1650, a Portuguese commander named Pereira sought to marry the daughter of a Hindu trader living in Oman. Later, in 1765, the Danish traveler Nibuhr documented the presence of around 1,200 Hindus in Muscat alone. He writes:

In no other Mahometan city are the Indians so numerous as in Maskat; their number in this city amounts to no fewer than 1,200. They are permitted to live agreeable to their own laws, to bring wives hither, to set up idols in their chambers, and to burn their dead.

Hindu traders were not limited to commerce and customs duties; they were also active in money lending and were widely regarded as trustworthy and honest.

For centuries, Muscat attracted Hindu merchants involved in various trades, including pearls and grains. There were at least 4,000 Hindus in Oman in the early 19th century. In 1895, the Hindu presence in Muscat came under attack by the Ibadis and by 1900, the number of Hindus decreased to 300. By 1970, local accounts suggested that more than 120 families could trace their continuous residence in Oman back to 1900, which would have made them eligible for citizenship. However, complications in the citizenship process prevented this from being fully realized. The historical quarters of al-Waljat and al-Banyan are no longer occupied by Hindus.

== Demographics ==
Oman is the only country in the Middle East with an indigenous Hindu population. There are at least 1,000 Hindus in Oman with Omani citizenship. According to the CIA, there are 259,780 Hindus constituting 5.5% of population.

== Temples ==
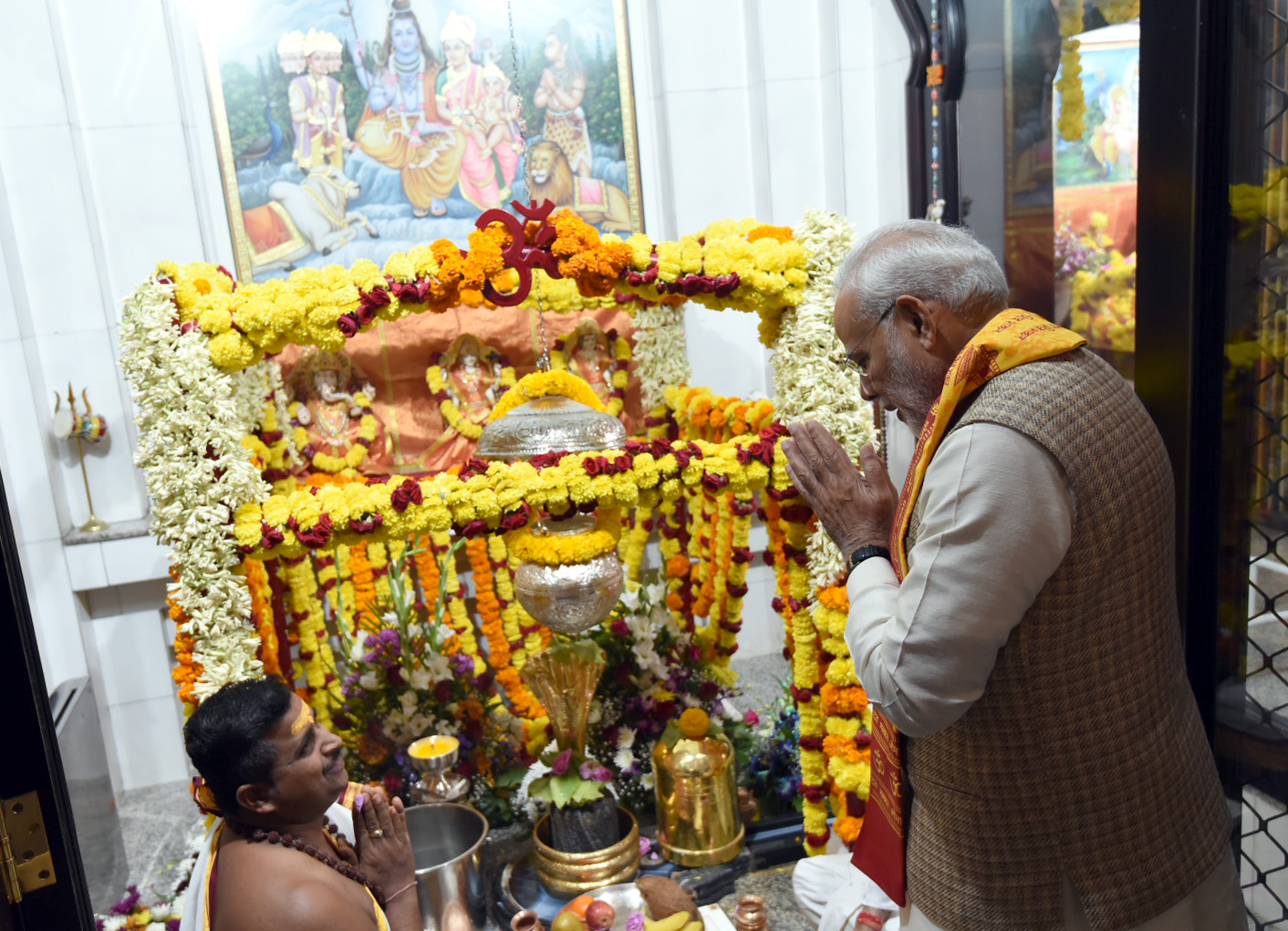
Prime Minister Modi performed Abhishekam at the historic Lord Shiva temple in Muscat, Oman, on 2018

There are two officially recognized Hindu temples in Oman. The Shiva temple in Muscat (Motishwar Mandir) in Oman is one of the oldest Hindu temples in the Middle East region. The other is the Krishna Temple, also in Muscat.

== Famous Omani Hindus ==
- Kanaksi Khimji was the only Hindu Sheikh in the world
- Hemal Mehta, cricketer
- Ajay Lalcheta, cricketer
- Suraj Kumar, cricketer

== See also ==
- Hinduism in the Middle East
- BAPS Hindu Mandir Abu Dhabi
- Shrinathji Temple, Bahrain
