= Christianity in Oman =

Christianity is the religion of 3.63% of the population of Oman in 2020. Ninety Christian congregations exist in the country.

There is little official record of Christianity in Oman until the arrival of the Portuguese in 1504, but ruins from what is thought to have been a church were located in Suhar. Additionally, Chronicle of Arbela tells of a diocese at Bet Mazunaye, an area which included Oman. However, the authenticity of the sixth-century text is disputed amongst scholars.

Almost all Christians in Oman are from other countries. Most of them are from the Philippines, India or Western countries, and they are concentrated in the country's urban areas: Muscat, Sohar, and Salalah. For many Christians living and working outside these areas, going to church is inaccessible and therefore only happens on occasion. At least one St. Thomas Christian church was present in Oman in 2007, and more than 50 different Christian groups, fellowships, and assemblies are active in the Muscat metropolitan area. The Protestant Church of Oman, the Catholic vicariate and the al Amana Center (interdenominational Christian) are recognized by the Ministry of Endowments and Religious Affairs. There is also a Christian cemetery located in Muscat, operated by the Petroleum Development Oman.

Islam is the official state religion, but Article 28 of the Omani constitution limits freedom of religious practices to the boundaries of Islamic law. Therefore, Christians in Oman enjoy very little religious freedom; they are bound to strict rules. For example, Christians must practice on specific land that the government has allocated for them. It is also difficult for churches to get permits for construction, and permission to host public religious gatherings is challenging to attain. Private gatherings are prohibited, although this law is not always strictly enforced.

Proselytizing in public is forbidden. A 2015 study estimates that around 200 Christians from a Muslim background live in the country, and not all of those are necessarily citizens.

== Evangelism ==
Christian missionaries from the New Jersey-based Arabian Mission established a station in Muscat in November 1893. After the Portuguese left Oman in the mid-seventeenth century, this is considered to be the most significant interaction Omanis have had with Christianity. Their objective was to evangelize the Muslim population of the Arabian Peninsula through the teachings of the Bible and other Christian literature. As such, a printing press was opened in Muscat in 1900 with the intention of printing polemical and devotional literature. One of the pieces printed, "Jesus or Mohammed", portraying the Prophet Mohammed as sinful and Jesus Christ as sinless.

Because their methodology was through the spread of literature, missionaries also provided educational services to Omanis. They would teach literacy through teaching the Bible, which they translated into Arabic. Missionary teachers also taught children other subjects, like math and writing. Missionaries set up medical facilities, as well. The obvious reason for this was delivering the power of Christ through healing, but it was also an additional chance to evangelize the population. Omanis saw the missionary doctors in more favorable terms than priests and educators, therefore allowing them access to spaces usually forbidden to missionaries. Thus, while there was no requirement for doctors to evangelize, they oftentimes took advantage of their privileged position among Omanis to proselytize. For more rural populations that had no access to modern medical services, this could entice them to convert.

== Eastern Orthodoxy ==
Eastern Orthodox Christians in Oman are under the ecclesiastical jurisdiction of the Archdiocese of Baghdad, Kuwait and Dependencies, that belongs to the Eastern Orthodox Patriarchate of Antioch and All the East. The main center of Eastern Orthodoxy in Oman is the Parish in Masqat, headed by priest Michael Ajram. There are currently [when?] 24,000 Orthodox Christians, 12.5% of the overall Christian population in the country. The first Orthodox church in Oman, Sts. Constantine and Helen Church began construction in April 2019 in Muscat.

== Roman Catholicism ==
According to recent estimates, there are 138,000 Catholics in Oman, making up almost 70% of all Christians in the country. Oman belongs to the area of the Apostolic Vicariate of Arabia, which handles four parishes in Oman in Sohar, Salalah, and two in Muscat. The oldest standing Catholic church is Sts. Peter and Paul Church in Muscat, built in 1977. The church in Salalah, the St. Francis Parish Church, is the most recent and opened its doors in September 2019. Twenty-one Catholic congregations exist in Oman. According to Father Raul Ramos of Sts. Peter and Paul Church, most of the Christians he has encountered are from India and the Philippines, as well as expats from Nepal, Pakistan, Sri-Lanka, and Bangladesh. He also says that non-Muslim expats sometimes convert to Catholicism, but to respect Oman's laws, expats seek baptism during holiday breaks in their home countries.

== Protestantism and Pentecostalism ==
5.8% of Christians in Oman are Protestants, approximately 11,500 people. Oman belongs to the area of the Diocese of Cyprus and the Gulf of the Episcopal Church in Jerusalem and the Middle East. Twenty-one Protestant denominations are present in Oman, and they all fall under the umbrella of the Protestant Church of Oman (PCO). There is a campus in Salalah, one in Sohar, and two campuses in Muscat. There are four actual congregations in Muscat, all in different languages: Korean, English, Arabic, and Tagalog.

There is a Pentecostal Assembly located in Muscat. Its congregants are largely Indian expats, and it is the largest Malayali congregation in the Middle East. There are over 1,500 members, and service is conducted in four different languages: Hindi, English, Malayalam, and Tamil.

== See also ==
- Religion in Oman
