= Mohammed bin Said bin Khalfan Al Mamari =

Omani politician

- محمد بن سعيد بن خلفان المعمري
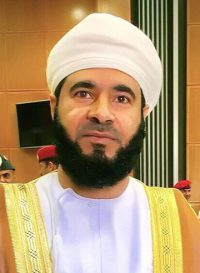

Minister of Awqaf and Religious Affairs
- Incumbent
- Assumed office 16 June 2022
- Monarch: Haitham bin Tariq
- Prime Minister: Haitham bin Tariq
- Preceded by: Abdullah bin Muhammad bin Abdullah Al Salmi

Mohammed bin Said bin Khalfan Al Mamari (Arabic: محمد بن سعيد بن خلفان المعمري) is the Omani minister of awqaf and religious affairs. He was appointed as minister on 16 June 2022.

== Education ==
Al Mamari went to university in the UK and Germany and holds a doctorate in Islamic studies.

== Career ==
Al Mamari was advisor to the office of the Minister of Awqaf and Religious Affairs and director of the Omani Tolerance Project.

On 12 August 2020, Al Mamari was appointed Undersecretary of the Ministry of Awqaf and Religious Affairs.

Since 16 June 2022, Al Mamari has been Minister of Awqaf and Religious Affairs.
