= Motishwar Mandir =

Hindu temple in Oman

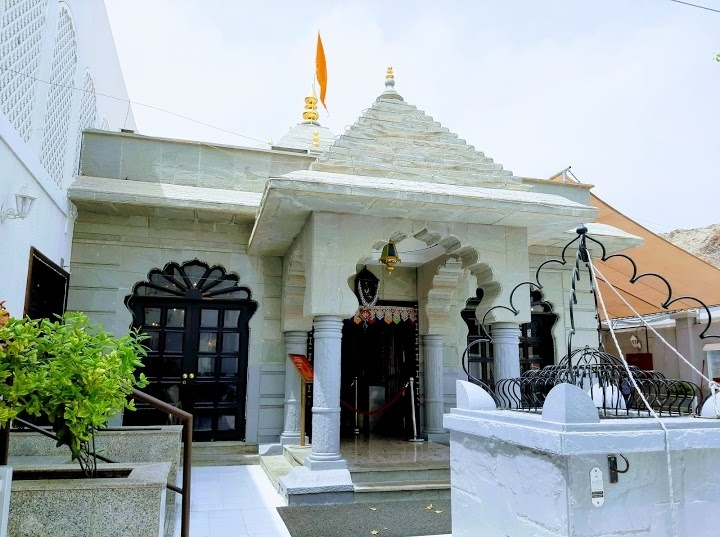

- Location within Oman Location within Asia

Religion
- Affiliation: Hinduism
- Province: Muscat Governorate
- Deity: Adi Motishwar Mahadev, Motishwar Mahadev and Hanuman
- Festivals: Maha Shivaratri, Vasant Panchmi, Ramnavmi, Hanuman Jayanti, Shravan and Ganesh Chaturthi

Location
- Location: Muttrah, Old Muscat
- Country: Oman
- Coordinates: 23.609729°N 58.588217°E

Architecture
- Completed: 1892-1909
- Temple: 3

Motishwar Mandir is a Shiva temple complex located near the Al Alam Palace in the Muttrah area of Old Muscat, Oman. It is one of the oldest Hindu temples in the Middle East region. The temple celebrates numerous Hindu festivals such as Vasant Panchmi, Ramnavmi, Hanuman Jayanti, Shravan and Ganesh Chaturthi. Over 20,000 Hindus visit the temple during Maha Shivaratri.

== History ==
The temple is believed to have been built in 1909 by the Thatta's Bhatia community in Oman. The Bhatia community from Sindh first settled in Muscat in 1507.

== Overview ==
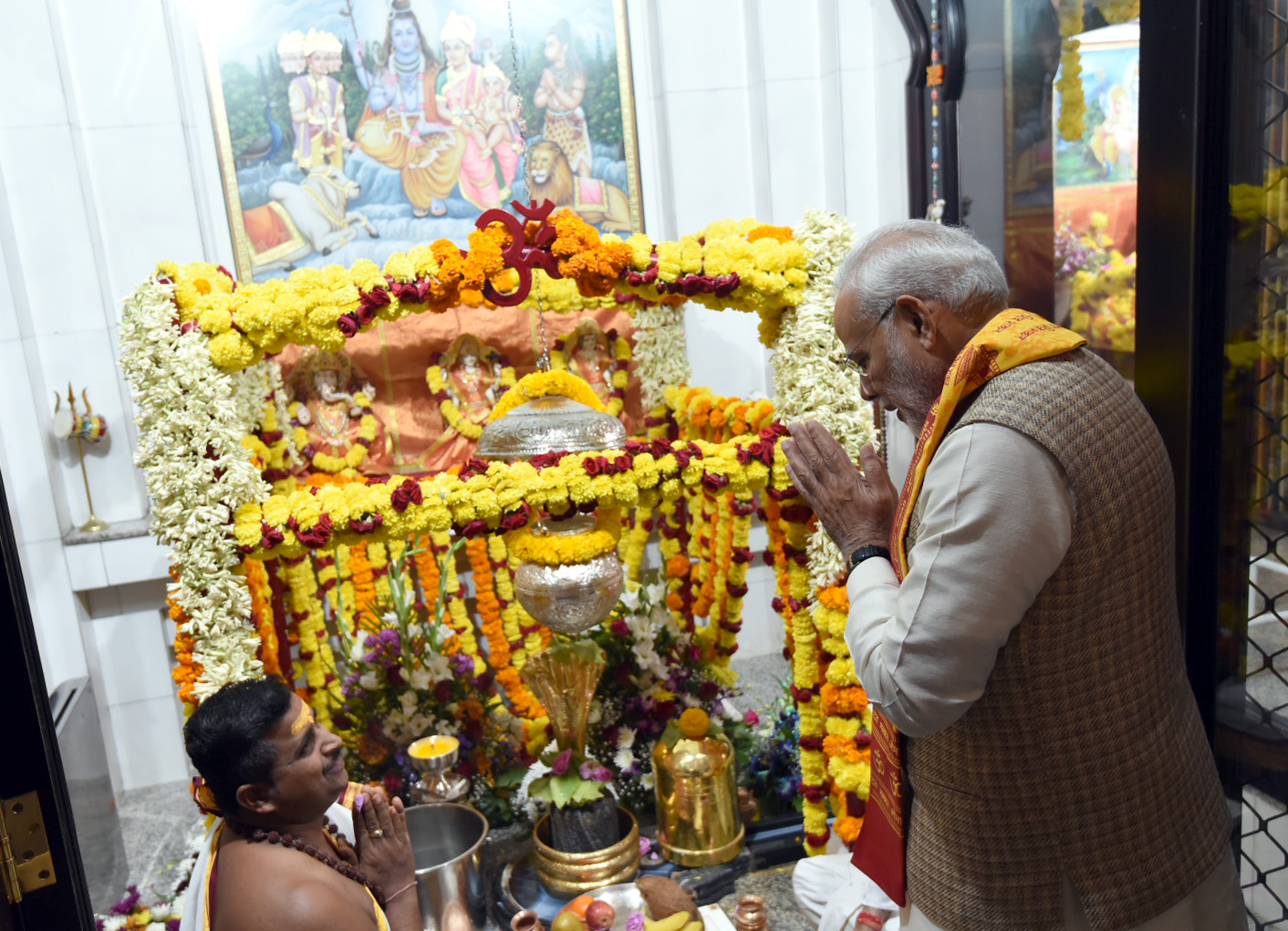
Indian Prime Minister Narendra Modi performing Abhishekam in the Shiva temple in 2018

The complex contains three temples - Shri Adi Motishwar Mahadev Temple, Shri Motishwar Mahadev Temple and Shri Hanumanji Temple. Although Muscat is a desert, the temple's well has water throughout the year. There are three priests in the temple along with three support staff and four administrative staff, besides a whole gamut of volunteers rendering their services.

Indian Prime Minister Narendra Modi visited the temple on 12 February 2018, during his state visit to Oman, and performed an abhishekam and interacted with the members of the Temple Management Committee.

== See also ==
- BAPS Hindu Mandir Abu Dhabi
- Shrinathji Temple, Bahrain
- Hinduism in Oman
