= Moteshwar Mahadev =

Hindu Temple in Uttarakhand

- Shree Moteshwar (Bheemashankar) Mahadev
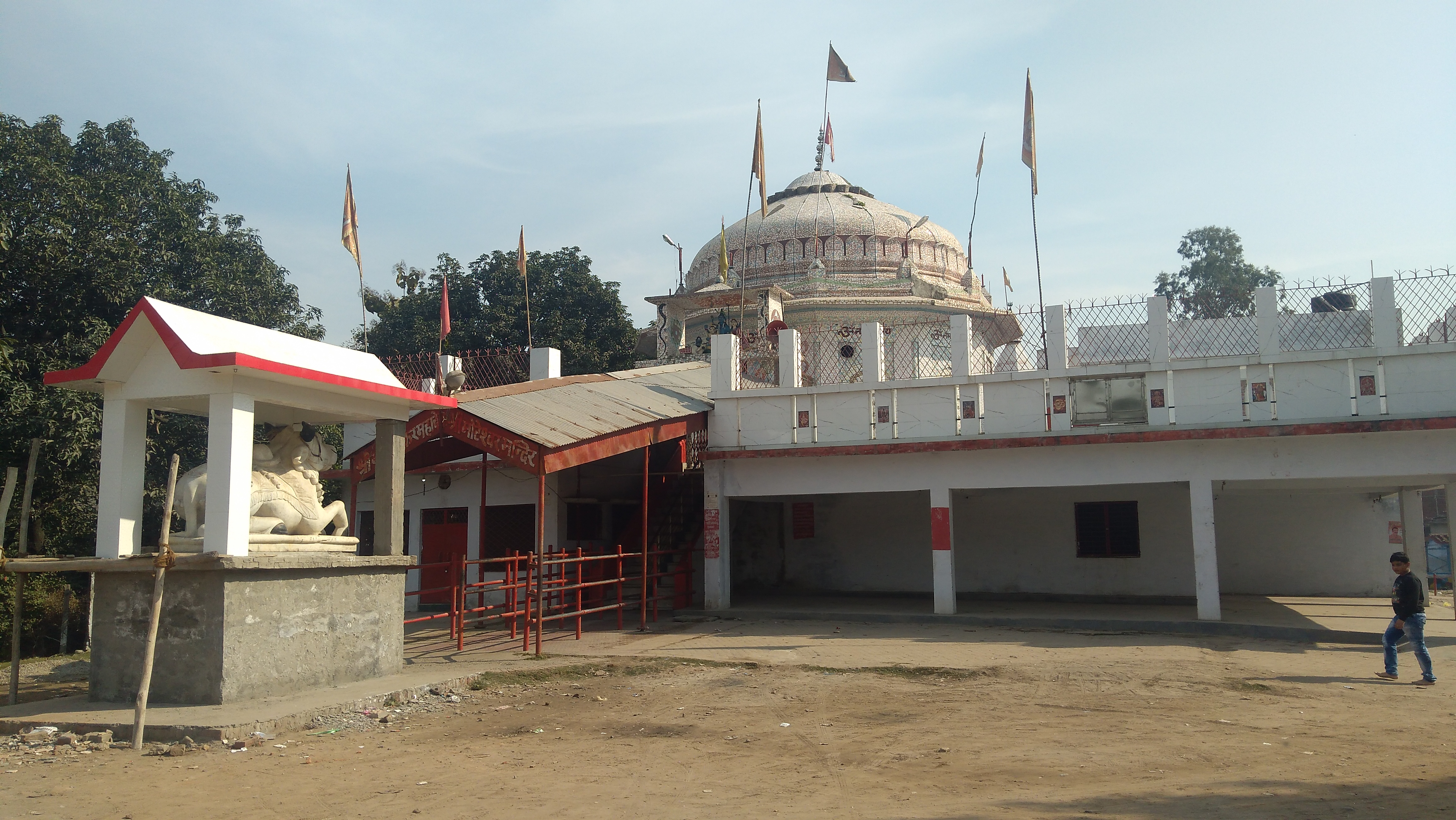

- Location in Uttarakhand

Religion
- Affiliation: Hinduism
- District: Udham Singh Nagar
- Deity: Bhimashankar (Shiva)
- Festival: Maha Shivaratri

Location
- Location: Kashipur
- State: Uttarakhand
- Country: India
- Interactive map of Moteshwar Mahadev
- Coordinates: 28.976509°N 79.393650°E

Shree Moteshwar Mahadev, also known as Shree Bheem Shankar Mahadev, is an abode of Lord Shiva in Kashipur of Uttarakhand state, India. This place was known as the Dakini State in ancient days.

Kashipur (Govishn) is a historic place in Udham Singh Nagar district. Around 1 km away is a place known as Ujjanak. This is where Lord Shiva is situated in his full face as a Jyotirlingam known as Bheem Shankar. This is the Bheem Shankar Jyotirlingam.

== Pooja ==
Timings: 6:00 AM to 12:00 Noon & 4:00 PM to 8:00 PM Sandhya aarti at 7.10pm in summers....

=== Deity ===
The primary deity worshiped is Shiva. Other deities are Parvati, Kartikeya, Ganesha Hanuman, Kali, Bhairo, Krishna, Lord Rama

== Fairs ==
- Maha Shivratri Fair
- Chaiti Mela
- Shrawan Mela

== Visiting ==
Shree Moteshwar (Bheema Shankar) Mahadev is in the Ujjanak area of Kashipur which is around 3 km from the Kashipur bus station. Kashipur is well connected by road with all major cities of North India and is linked to Delhi, Lucknow, Moradabad, Ramnagar and Varanasi by train.

The nearest airport is at Pantnagar which is about 72 km from Kashipur. Apart from Pantnagar, it is 223 km from the Jolly Grant Airport Dehradun major Airport of the State of Uttarakhand.

== Kashipur ==
Kashipur was known as Govishan or Govisana during the time of Harsha (606–647 AD), when Xuanzang (631–641 AD) visited this region. The ruins of the large settlement of those days are still near the city. Kashipur is named after Kashinath Adhikari, the founder of the township and governor of the pargana, one of the officers of the Chand Kings of Kumaon in the 16th-17th century.

Poet Gumani wrote a poem on this town. Girital and Drona sagar are well-known spots and are associated with the story of the Pandavas. The Chaiti mela is the best known fair of Kashipur. Today Kashipur is an important industrial township. In autumn (after monsoon) one can see the snowclad peaks of Trishul and its surroundings.

== History ==
According to the Shiva Purana Bhima Shankar Jyotirlingam is in Kamroop. After seeing historic and spiritual books, it is called the place of Bheem Shankar Jyotirlingam. The reason for this is after looking to many of the spiritual books we come to know that this place was known as Kamroop.

In Mahabharata time this place was also known as Dakini. This was the reason Adi Shankaracharya has illustrated the place by saying "Dakiniyam Bhimashankaram". Its existence is also described by Kalidas in his "Raghuvansh". Hence we have to believe that this is the Kamroop Desh. The reason for the name Dakini is the forests which has gone from Saharanpur to Nepal consisted a Hidimba named devil which took birth in Dakini Yoni and got married with the victorious PandavaBhushan BheemSen. She was a Dakini but as she lived in a devil posture she was called a Devil.

The lingam of this temple is very large and touching the whole ling with two human hands is impossible. This kind of lingam is not present in any other part of the country. It is believed that it rises and till now it has reached second floor. After seeing many facts we can say this temple was built around 302 AD. It includes a Bhairav Nath temple and a Kund known as Shiv Ganga Kund; in front of this kund is the river Kosi. On the West is a temple of Maa Jagdamba Bhagwati Balsundari, and every year in the month of Chaitra a huge fair is organized here. A place known as Kila describes the historic scenes of this temple. This is the kila where Guru Dronacharya gave teaching to Kaurava and Pandava. Guru dronacharya motivated Bheemsen to reconstruct this temple which later was known as Bheem Shankar. Shravan Kumar rested here. West to this kila is Dronasagar which was also built by pandavas for their guru Dronacharya. The lingam is too fat so people here named it "Moteshwar Mahadev".

Shree Moteshwar (Bheema Shankar) Mahadev is regarded as one of the 12 Jyotirlinga of Lord Shiva. Information about this temple is also referred in Mahabharat

Shiv Manokamna Kund is adjacent to the temple.

There is a Bhimashankar Temple near Pune in Maharashtra, which was also referred to as Daakini country and considered as one of the Jyotirlinga. Bhimshankar temple near Guwahati, Assam is the jyotirlinga according to Sivapuran. According to "Linga Puran", Bhimshankar Temple at Bhimpur near Gunupur of Rayagada District in Odisha is debated as one of the Jyotirling, which is at the western part of the holy Mahendragiri mountains and at the river.

The river flowing beside the Moteshwar Maha Dev Temple of Kashipur (Uttarakhand) is locally known as Bahela and not Kosi which is about 9 km eastward to this place near village Patti Sultanpur on the NH 74 i.e. the Baz pur Road heading towards Rudrapur in the east.
