= Buddhism in the Middle East =

Buddhism has been present in the Middle East and influenced some Middle Eastern religions such as Manichaeism. Buddhism, per some estimates by early medieval Muslim scholars such as Al-Biruni, was present from Eastern ancient Persia up to the frontier of Syria before the advent of Islam.

Al-Biruni has the following detailed account to offer: "Another circumstance which increased the already existing antagonism between Hindus and foreigners is that the so-called Shamaniyya (commonly understood as Buddhists), though they cordially hate the Brahmans, still are nearer akin to them than to others. In former times, Khorasan (understood as Eastern Persia), Fars (Ancient province of Fars in Persia), Iraq, Mosul, the country up to the frontier of Syria, was Buddhist".

There still remains a tiny community of Middle Eastern followers of Buddhism, though unrecognized by the state governments in the region, including in Lebanon and Iran.

It is estimated that in the Middle East, over 900,000 people profess Buddhism as their religion. Buddhist adherents make up just over 0.3% of the Middle East total population. Many of these Buddhists are workers who have migrated from other parts of Asia to the Middle East since the late 1990s, many of them come from countries that have large Buddhist populations, such as South Korea, China, Vietnam, Thailand, Sri Lanka, India, Japan, and Nepal.

== Demographics ==
Theravada Buddhism is the predominant religion of workers from Myanmar, Thailand and Sri Lanka. Mahayana Buddhism is the predominant religion of workers from East Asia and Vietnam, although Taoism, Confucianism, and Shinto are also represented among these people. In Dubai (the United Arab Emirates) and Qatar, the workers from Sri Lanka were allowed to celebrate Vesak (the most important holiday in Buddhism) in those Islamic countries.

== Saudi Arabia ==
It is estimated that there are 13.49 million foreign residents living and working in Saudi Arabia.

In addition to 400,000 Sri Lankans, there are a few thousand Buddhist workers from East Asia, the majority of whom are Chinese, Vietnamese, and Thai. A number of Tibetan-Nepalese immigrants may also be among the foreign population of Saudi Arabia. According to a 2020 report by the Association of Religion Data Archives, Buddhists make up about 0.33% of the Saudi population with comprehensive data on foreigners being unavailable.

== Qatar ==
In 2020, Buddhism was represented by between 1.8–3.8% of the population of Qatar, mainly comprising migrant workers from South-East Asia and East Asia especially from China, South Korea, Japan, and Vietnam.

== Israel ==
As of 2020, Israel had approximately 20,000 Buddhists, constituting about 0.30% of the population. Israel also has several Buddhist centers across its country, mainly in Tel Aviv, Haifa, and other regions, including the capital, Jerusalem.

== Kuwait ==
There are approximately 100,000 Buddhists living in Kuwait constituting around 5% of the total population. Currently, there are no known Buddhist organizations or temples found in Kuwait.

== UAE ==
The Buddhist population in the United Arab Emirates consists primarily of expatriates from South Asia and Southeast asian countries such as Thailand, Malaysia, Sri Lanka, and Nepal. The Mahamevnawa Buddhist Monastery branch in Dubai, established in 2009, is the UAE’s only Buddhist temple which serves the Buddhist population. There were about 2.40% Buddhists in the UAE.

== See also ==
- Buddhism in the West
- Hinduism in the Middle East
- Index of Buddhism-related articles
