= Ministry of Endowments and Religious Affairs (Oman) =

Governmental body in the Sultanate of Oman

Coordinates: 23°35′56″N 58°25′14″E

Sultanate of Oman Ministry of Endowments and Religious Affairs
- وزارة الأوقاف والشؤون الدينية

Agency overview
- Jurisdiction: Government of Oman
- Headquarters: Muscat (Oman)
- Agency executive: Mohammed bin Said bin Khalfan Al Mamari, Minister
- Website: Official website

The Ministry of Awqaf and Religious Affairs (MARA) is the governmental body in the Sultanate of Oman responsible for overseeing all matters related to awqaf and religious affairs.

The current minister of awqaf and religious affairs is Mohammed bin Said bin Khalfan Al Mamari,; he was appointed as minister in the year 2022.

In 2017 Oman announced the Mushaf Muscat, the world’s 1st interactive calligraphic Quran. The Ministry is a voting member of the Unicode Consortium.

== History ==
The Ministry of Awqaf and Religious Affairs was originally established as the Ministry of Awqaf and Islamic Affairs. The original ministry was merged with the Ministry of Justice to established the Ministry of Justice, Awqaf and Religious Affairs in 1982, until they split up again in the year 1997 creating the ministry in its current name replacing the term "Islamic" with "Religious".

== Function ==
The competences of the Ministry of Awqaf and Religious Affairs are as follows:

1. Undertaking the affairs of awqaf and settings strategies and projects to reserve them and develop their resources.
2. Preserving the properties of Bayt al-mal.
3. Setting strategies for managing zakat (charity).
4. Establishing mosques and following all affairs related to them.
5. Supervising religious advisory and guidance and preparing nationals to specialise in related fields.
6. Developing Quran education.
7. Carrying out religious studies and research.
8. Coordinating with the concerned authorities the regulation of religious publications and works.
9. Supporting and helping pilgrims in their performance of hajj.
10. Exchange information and expertise with Arabic and Islamic religious organizations in the field of awqaf and religious affairs.
11. Representing the Sultanate in conferences, symposiums and meeting related to awqaf and religious affairs.

== Former Senior Officials ==
- Abdullah bin Salim Al Zidi - appointed Undersecretary for the Ministry of Awqaf and Islamic Affairs in 1979.
- Hilal bin Hamad Alsammar - appointed Minister of Justice, Awqaf, and Islamic Affairs in 1982.
- Abdullah bin Ali Al Khalili - appointed Undersecretary for the Ministry of Justice, Awqaf, and Islamic Affairs in 1982 (for the whole ministry proper).
- Hilal bin Sultan bin Saif Al Hosni - appointed Undersecretary For Awqaf and Islamic Affairs in the Ministry of Justice, Awqaf and Religious Affairs in 1982.
- Hilal bin Saood bin Harib Al Busaidi - appointed Minister of Justice, Awqaf and Islamic Affairs in 1987.
- Abdullah bin Mohammed bin Abdullah Al Salmi - appointed Minister of Endowments and Religious Affairs in 1997.
