= Outline of Oman =

Country in West Asia

The Flag of Oman

The National emblem of Oman

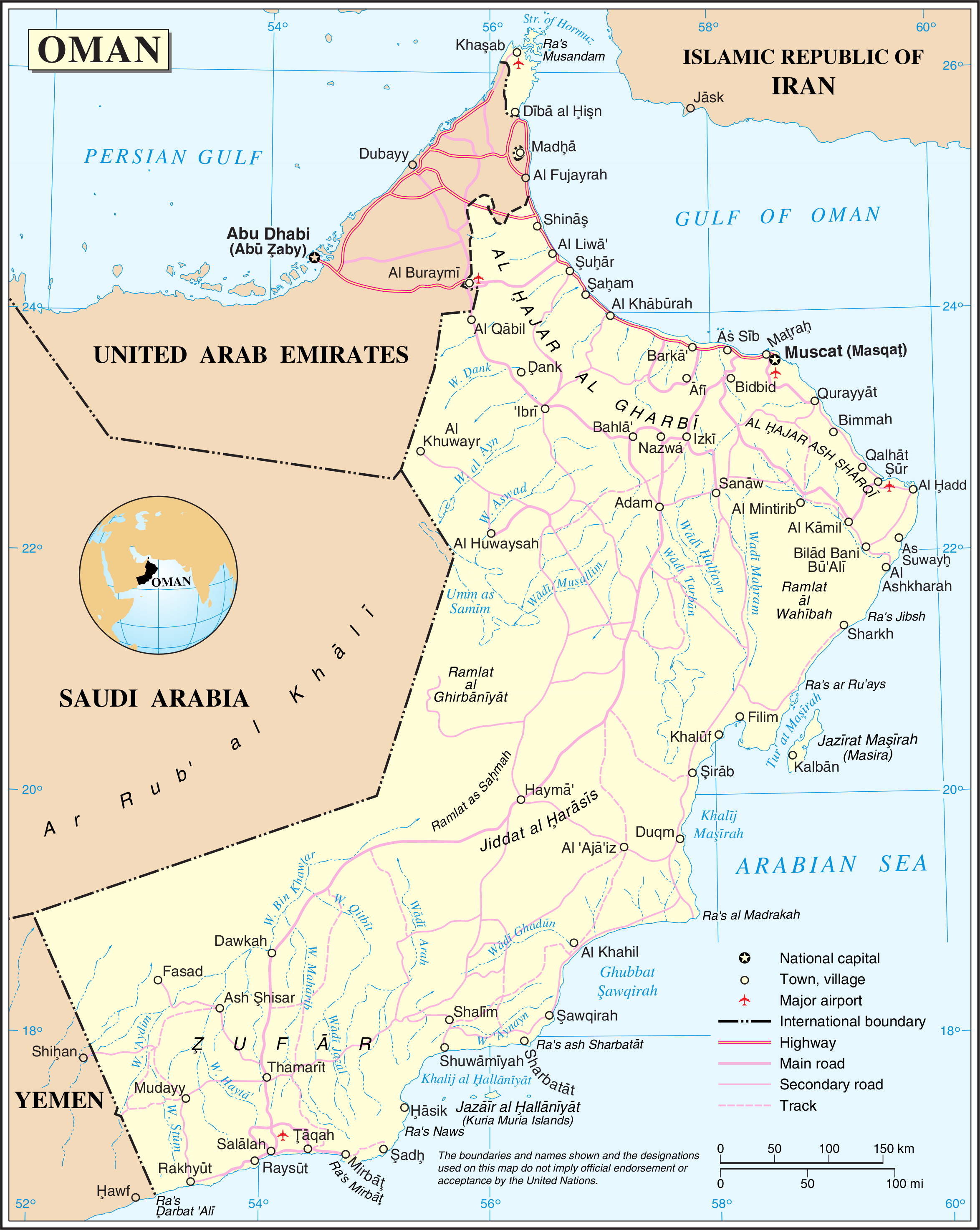
An enlargeable map of the Sultanate of Oman

The following outline is provided as an overview of and topical guide to Oman:

Oman – sovereign country located in West Asia along the eastern coast of the Arabian Peninsula. Oman borders the United Arab Emirates on the northwest, Saudi Arabia on the west and Yemen on the southwest. The coast is formed by the Arabian Sea on the south and east and the Gulf of Oman on the northeast. The country also contains Madha, an exclave enclosed by the United Arab Emirates, and Musandam, an exclave also separated by Emirati territory.

== General reference ==
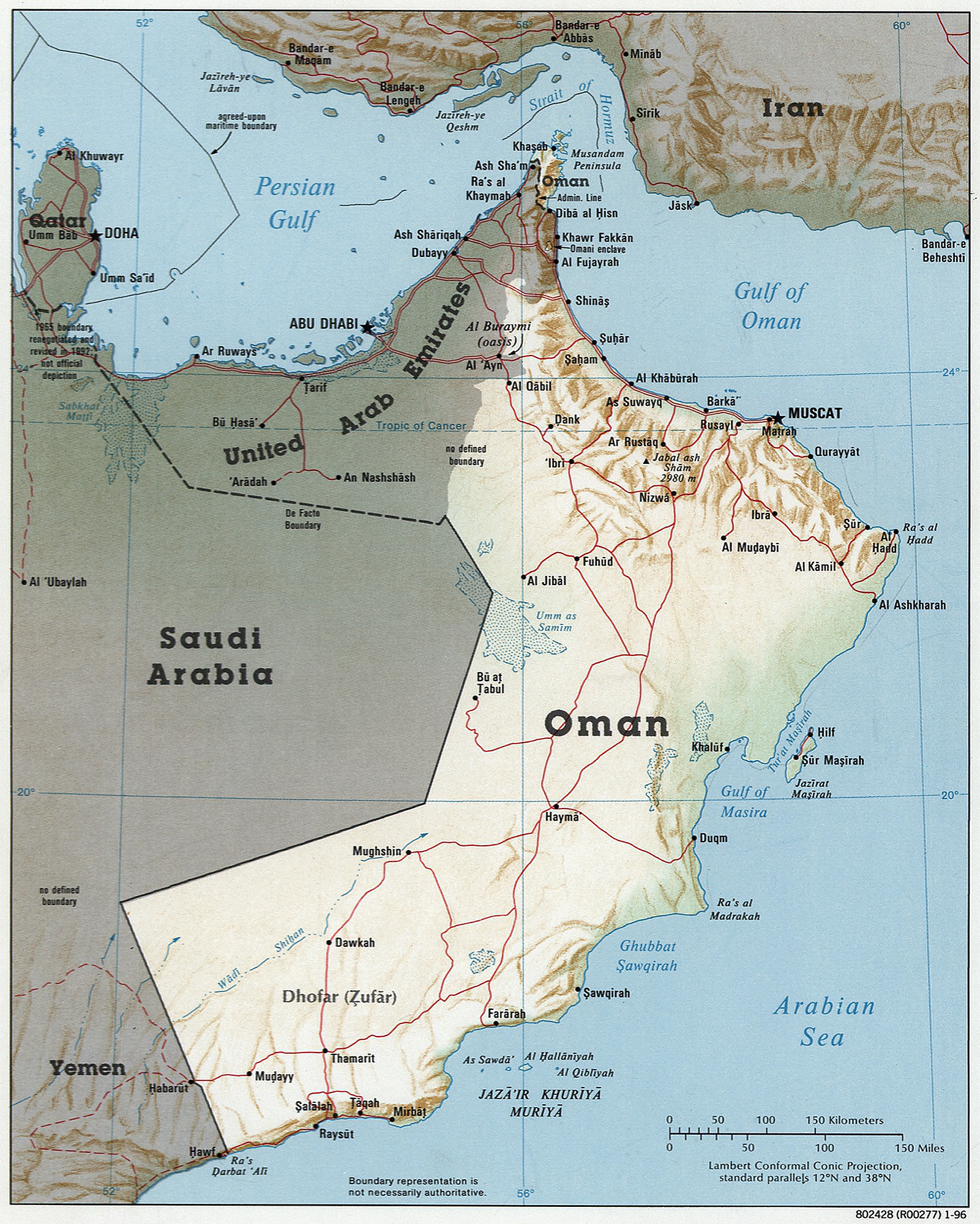
An enlargeable relief map of Oman

- Pronunciation:
- Common English country name: Oman
- Official English country name: The Sultanate of Oman
- Common endonym(s):
- Official endonym(s):
- Adjectival(s): Omani
- Demonym(s):
- Etymology: Name of Oman
- International rankings of Oman
- ISO country codes: OM, OMN, 512
- ISO region codes: See ISO 3166-2:OM
- Internet country code top-level domain: .om

== Geography of Oman ==
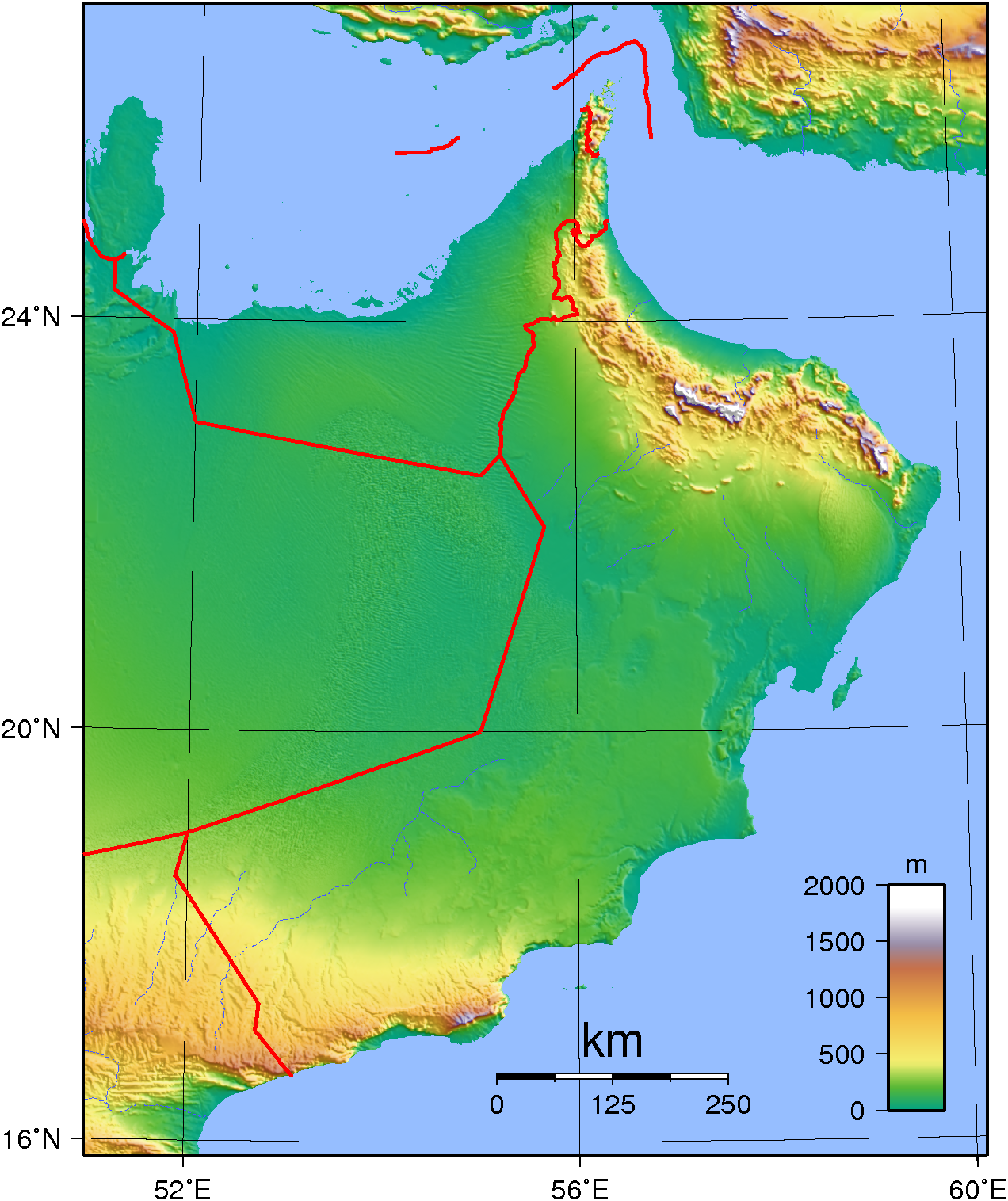
An enlargeable topographic map of Oman

Geography of Oman

- Oman is: a country
- Location:
  - Northern Hemisphere and Eastern Hemisphere
  - Eurasia
    - Asia
      - Southwest Asia
  - Middle East
    - Arabian Peninsula
  - Time zone: UTC+04
  - Extreme points of Oman
    - High: Jabal Shams 2,980 m (9,777 ft)
    - Low: Arabian Sea 0 m
  - Land boundaries: 1,374 km

Saudi Arabia 676 km
United Arab Emirates 410 km
Yemen 288 km

- Coastline: 2,092 km

- Population of Oman: 2,595,000 - 139th most populous country
- Area of Oman: 309,500 km^{2}
- Atlas of Oman

=== Environment of Oman ===
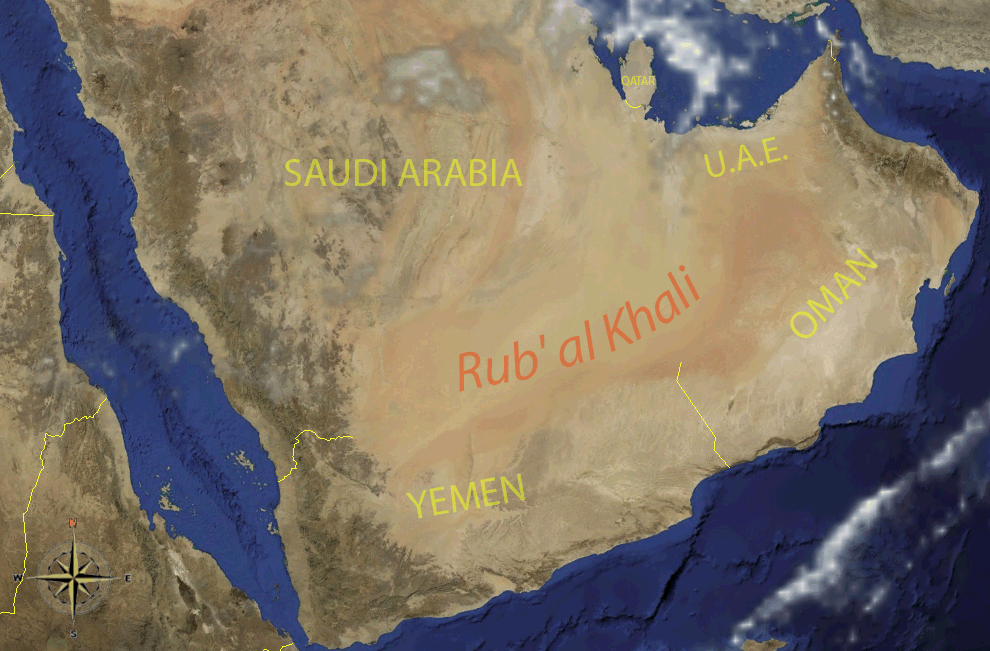
An enlargeable satellite image of Oman and southern Arabia

- Climate of Oman
  - Climate of Muscat
- Renewable energy in Oman
- Geology of Oman
- List of wadis of Oman
- Protected areas of Oman
  - Biosphere reserves in Oman
  - National parks of Oman
- Wildlife of Oman
  - Fauna of Oman
    - Birds of Oman
    - Mammals of Oman

==== Natural geographic features of Oman ====
- Glaciers of Oman
- Islands of Oman
- Lakes of Oman
- Mountains of Oman
  - Volcanoes in Oman
- Rivers of Oman
  - Waterfalls of Oman
- Valleys of Oman
- World Heritage Sites in Oman

=== Regions of Oman ===
Regions of Oman

==== Ecoregions of Oman ====
List of ecoregions in Oman

==== Administrative divisions of Oman ====
Administrative divisions of Oman

- Governorates of Oman
- Provinces of Oman
- Capital of Oman: Muscat
- Cities of Oman

=== Demography of Oman ===
Demographics of Oman

== Government and politics of Oman ==
Politics of Oman

- Form of government: absolute monarchy
- Capital of Oman: Muscat
- Elections in Oman
- Political parties in Oman

=== Branches of the government of Oman ===
Government of Oman

==== Executive branch of the government of Oman ====
- Head of state and head of government: Sultan of Oman, Haitham bin Tariq
- Cabinet of Oman

==== Legislative branch of the government of Oman ====
- Parliament of Oman (bicameral) - since the Sultan has complete authority, Oman's parliament serves in an advisory capacity only
  - Upper house: Council of State of Oman
  - Lower house: Consultative Assembly of Oman

==== Judicial branch of the government of Oman ====
Court system of Oman

- Supreme Court of Oman

=== Foreign relations of Oman ===
Foreign relations of Oman

- Diplomatic missions in Oman
- Diplomatic missions of Oman

==== International organization membership ====
The Sultanate of Oman is a member of:

- Arab Bank for Economic Development in Africa (ABEDA)
- Arab Fund for Economic and Social Development (AFESD)
- Arab Monetary Fund (AMF)
- Cooperation Council for the Arab States of the Gulf (GCC)
- Food and Agriculture Organization (FAO)
- Group of 77 (G77)
- International Bank for Reconstruction and Development (IBRD)
- International Civil Aviation Organization (ICAO)
- International Criminal Court (ICCt) (signatory)
- International Criminal Police Organization (Interpol)
- International Development Association (IDA)
- International Finance Corporation (IFC)
- International Fund for Agricultural Development (IFAD)
- International Hydrographic Organization (IHO)
- International Labour Organization (ILO)
- International Maritime Organization (IMO)
- International Mobile Satellite Organization (IMSO)
- International Monetary Fund (IMF)
- International Olympic Committee (IOC)
- International Organization for Standardization (ISO)
- International Telecommunication Union (ITU)
- International Telecommunications Satellite Organization (ITSO)
- Inter-Parliamentary Union (IPU)
- Islamic Development Bank (IDB)
- League of Arab States (LAS)
- Multilateral Investment Guarantee Agency (MIGA)
- Nonaligned Movement (NAM)
- Organisation of Islamic Cooperation (OIC)
- Organisation for the Prohibition of Chemical Weapons (OPCW)
- United Nations (UN)
- United Nations Conference on Trade and Development (UNCTAD)
- United Nations Educational, Scientific, and Cultural Organization (UNESCO)
- United Nations Industrial Development Organization (UNIDO)
- Universal Postal Union (UPU)
- World Customs Organization (WCO)
- World Federation of Trade Unions (WFTU)
- World Health Organization (WHO)
- World Intellectual Property Organization (WIPO)
- World Meteorological Organization (WMO)
- World Tourism Organization (UNWTO)
- World Trade Organization (WTO)

=== Law and order in Oman ===
Law of Oman

- Constitution of Oman
- Crime in Oman
- Human rights in Oman
  - LGBT rights in Oman
  - Freedom of religion in Oman
- Law enforcement in Oman
  - Royal Oman Police

=== Military of Oman ===
Military of Oman

- Command
  - Commander-in-chief:
    - Ministry of Defence of Oman
- Forces
  - Royal Army of Oman
  - Royal Navy of Oman
  - Royal Air Force of Oman
  - Royal Guard of Oman
- Military history of Oman
- Military ranks of Oman

=== Local government in Oman ===
Local government in Oman

== History of Oman ==
History of Oman

- Timeline of the history of Oman
- Current events of Oman
- Military history of Oman

== Culture of Oman ==
Culture of Oman

- Archaeology of Oman
- Architecture of Oman
- Cuisine of Oman
- Festivals in Oman
- Languages of Oman
- Media in Oman
- Museums in Oman
- National symbols of Oman
  - Flag of Oman
  - National anthem of Oman
  - National emblem of Oman
- People of Oman
- Prostitution in Oman
- Public holidays in Oman
- Records of Oman
- Religion in Oman
  - Buddhism in Oman
  - Christianity in Oman
  - Hinduism in Oman
  - Islam in Oman
  - Judaism in Oman
  - Sikhism in Oman
- World Heritage Sites in Oman
  - Bahla Fort

=== Art in Oman ===
- Art in Oman
- Cinema of Oman
- Literature of Oman
- Music of Oman
- Television in Oman
- Theatre in Oman

=== Sports in Oman ===
Sports in Oman

- Football in Oman
- Oman at the Olympics
- Traditional Games
  - List of traditional games in Oman

== Economy and infrastructure of Oman ==
Economy of Oman

- Economic rank, by nominal GDP (2007): 72nd (seventy-second)
- Buildings and structures in Oman
- Agriculture in Oman
- Banking in Oman
  - National Bank of Oman
- Communications in Oman
  - Internet in Oman
- Economy history in Oman
- Companies of Oman
- Currency of Oman: Rial
  - ISO 4217: OMR
- Energy in Oman
  - Energy policy of Oman
  - Oil industry in Oman
- Health care in Oman
- Labor workers in Oman
- Mining in Oman
- Manufacturing industries in Oman
- Research and development in Oman
- Standard of living in Oman
- Trade and services in Oman
- Oman Stock Exchange
- Tourism in Oman
  - Visa policy of Oman
- Transport in Oman
  - Airports in Oman
  - Rail transport in Oman
  - Roads in Oman
- Water supply and sanitation in Oman

== Education in Oman ==
- Madrasa
- Maktaba
- Katateeb
- Masjid
- A'Sabla
- AL Barza

=== Structure of education in Oman ===
- Elementary school in oman
- Secondary school in oman
- Higher education in oman

== See also ==
Oman

- List of international rankings
- List of Oman-related topics
- Member state of the United Nations
- Outline of Asia
- Outline of geography
