= Economy of Oman =

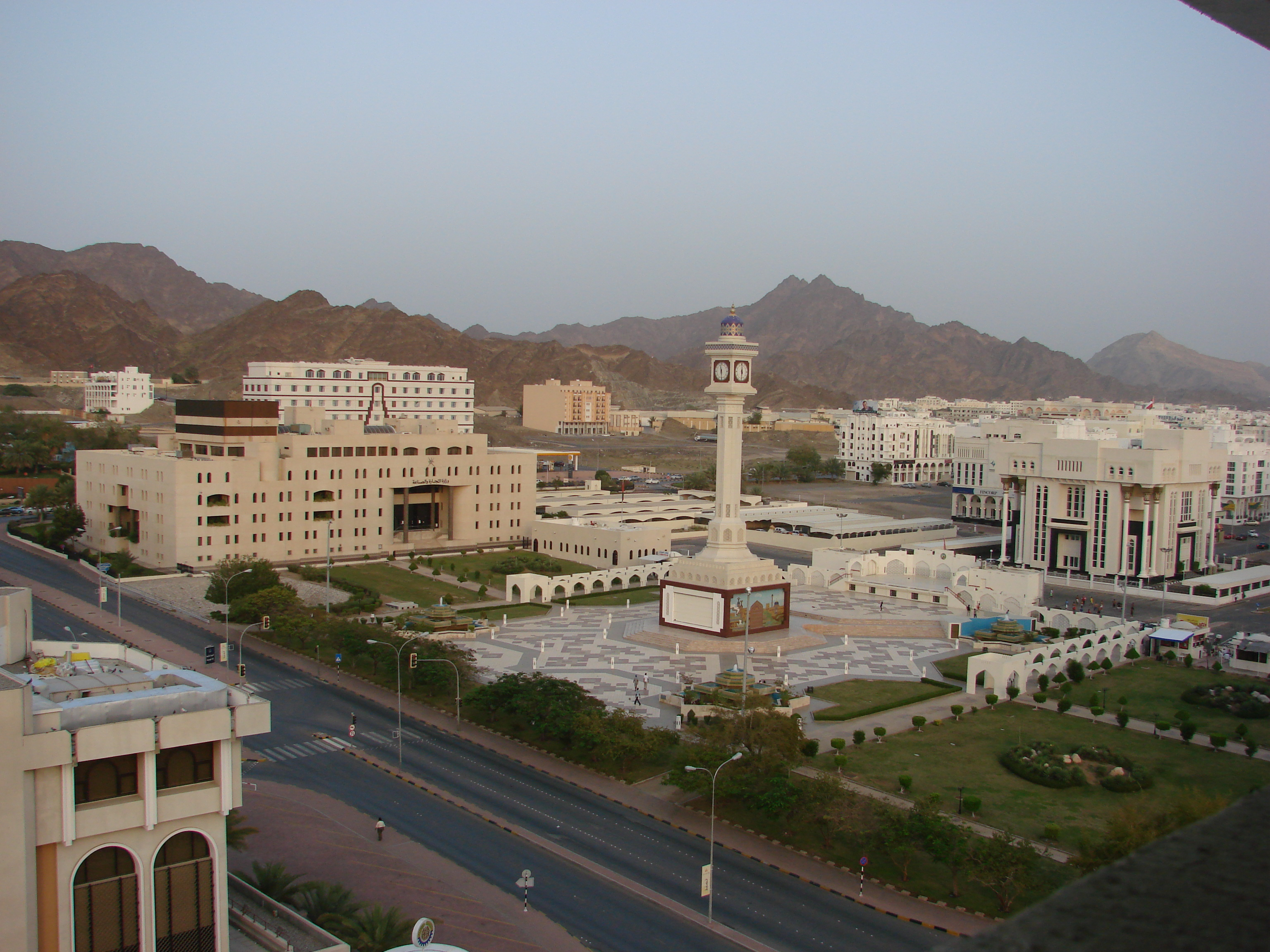
- Ruwi, the central business district of Muscat, Oman's capital and largest city
- Currency: Omani rial (OMR)
- Fixed exchange rates: US$1 ≈ 0.3845 OMR
- Fiscal year: Calendar year
- Trade organisations: WTO and GCC
- Country group: Developing/Emerging; High-income economy

Statistics
- Population: 5,281,538 (2024 est.)
- GDP: ▲$117.18 billion (nominal, 2026); ▲$247.39 billion (PPP, 2026)
- GDP rank: 70th (nominal, 2026); 77th (PPP, 2026)
- GDP growth: ▲2.5% (2025); ▲3.4% (2026); ▲3.3% (2027f)
- GDP per capita: ▲$21,645 (nominal, 2026; ▲$45,698 (PPP, 2026
- GDP per capita rank: 57th (nominal, 2026); 54th (PPP, 2026)
- GDP per capita growth: -2.8% (2024)
- GDP by sector: agriculture 1.7% industry 45.2% services 53% (2017 est.)
- Inflation (CPI): 1.3% (2024)
- Population below national poverty line: NA%
- Gini coefficient: 30.72 (2010); 0.30 (2023)
- Human Development Index: ▲0.858 very high (2023) (59th); ▲0.750 high IHDI (50th) (2023)
- Labour force: ▲2,578,897 (2023)
- Unemployment: ▼2.6% (Apr 2024)
- Youth unemployment: ▲13.9% (2025)
- Main industries: crude oil production and refining, natural and liquefied natural gas (LNG) production; construction, cement, copper, steel, chemicals, optic fiber

External
- Exports: ▲$69.701 billion (2022)
- Export goods: petroleum, reexports, fish, metals, textiles
- Main export partners: China 42.9%; Bangladesh 16.38% (2022); Malaysia 12.38% (2023); Turkey 6.38% (2025)
- Imports: ▲$46.326 billion (2022)
- Import goods: machinery and transport equipment, manufactured goods, food, livestock, lubricants
- Main import partners: UAE 25.1%; Saudi Arabia 12.4%; Pakistan 7.99%; Malaysia 7.03% (2023)
- FDI stock: NA; Abroad: NA
- Current account: ▲$5.652 billion (2022 est.)
- Gross external debt: ▼$37.5 billion (31 December 2024 est.)

Public finance
- Government debt: ▼34.1% of GDP (2024 est.)
- Revenue: $29.334 billion (2018 est.)
- Spending: $35.984 billion (2018 est.)
- Credit rating: Standard & Poor's: AAA (T&C Assessment); Outlook: Stable; Moody's: Aaa; Outlook: Fitch: AAA- Outlook: negative
- All values, unless otherwise stated, are in US dollars.

The economy of Oman is a high-income developing mixed economy that mainly centered around its oil sector, with fishing and trading activities located around its coastal regions. When oil was discovered in 1964, the production and export increased significantly. The government has made plans to diversify away from oil under its privatisation and Omanisation policies. This has helped raise Oman's GDP per capita continually in the past 50 years. It grew 339% in the 1960s, reaching a peak growth of 1,370% in the 1970s. Similar to the pricing of all other commodities, the price of oil is subject to significant fluctuations over time, especially those associated with the business cycle. A commodity's price will rise sharply when demand, like that for oil, outpaces supply; meanwhile, when supply outpaces demand, prices will fall.

It scaled back to a modest 13% growth in the 1980s and rose again to 34% in the 1990s. Oman joined the Gulf Cooperation Council in 1981 with the aim of establishing a customs union, a common market and a common currency.

Petroleum is responsible for 64% of all export revenue, 45% of government income, and 50% of GDP. Given that it accounts for half of the Sultanate of Oman's GDP, the petroleum products industry is one of the most significant in the Omani economy.

Oman's economy heavily relies on cement, a vital component of the construction industry. Cement plays a crucial role in facilitating urbanisation, infrastructure development, and overall economic expansion. The cement industry contributes to Oman's economy by providing employment opportunities, both directly and indirectly. It also generates revenue through taxes and fees and contributes to the development of related sectors, such as logistics and transportation. Omani fiscal policy includes government expenditures. The 2020 budget of Oman emphasizes fiscal discipline, rationalizing public expenditure along with improving its efficiency, identifying innovative means.

== History ==
The economic history of pre-modern Oman centered on copper mining, maritime trade networks and oasis agriculture. Early Oman was a primary supplier of copper and stone vessels for Mesopotamia and the Indus Valley around 3000 BCE. Strategic positioning on the Arabian Sea enabled Omani traders to act as key intermediaries in early Persian Gulf and Indian Ocean shipping routes.

By the 18th and 19th centuries, an independent Omani maritime empire expanded trade across the Persian Gulf, western India, and East Africa. British campaigns to end the slave trade and the regulation of Indian Ocean shipping dismantled the lucrative trafficking networks Omani elite fleets relied upon. Deprived of external commercial wealth, the domestic economy turned back to local agriculture (such as dates), fishing, camel and goat herding, and basic handicrafts.

Under Sultan Said bin Taimur, the country stayed cut off from global technological advancement, lacking basic infrastructure, electricity grids and modern schools. In 1970, Oman ended its isolation and utilized its newly discovered oil reserves and revenues to rapidly build modern infrastructure, and promoted universal education and healthcare.

In December 2020, Oman Vision 2040 was launched that focused on economic diversification, sustainability and institutional governance.

== Overview ==
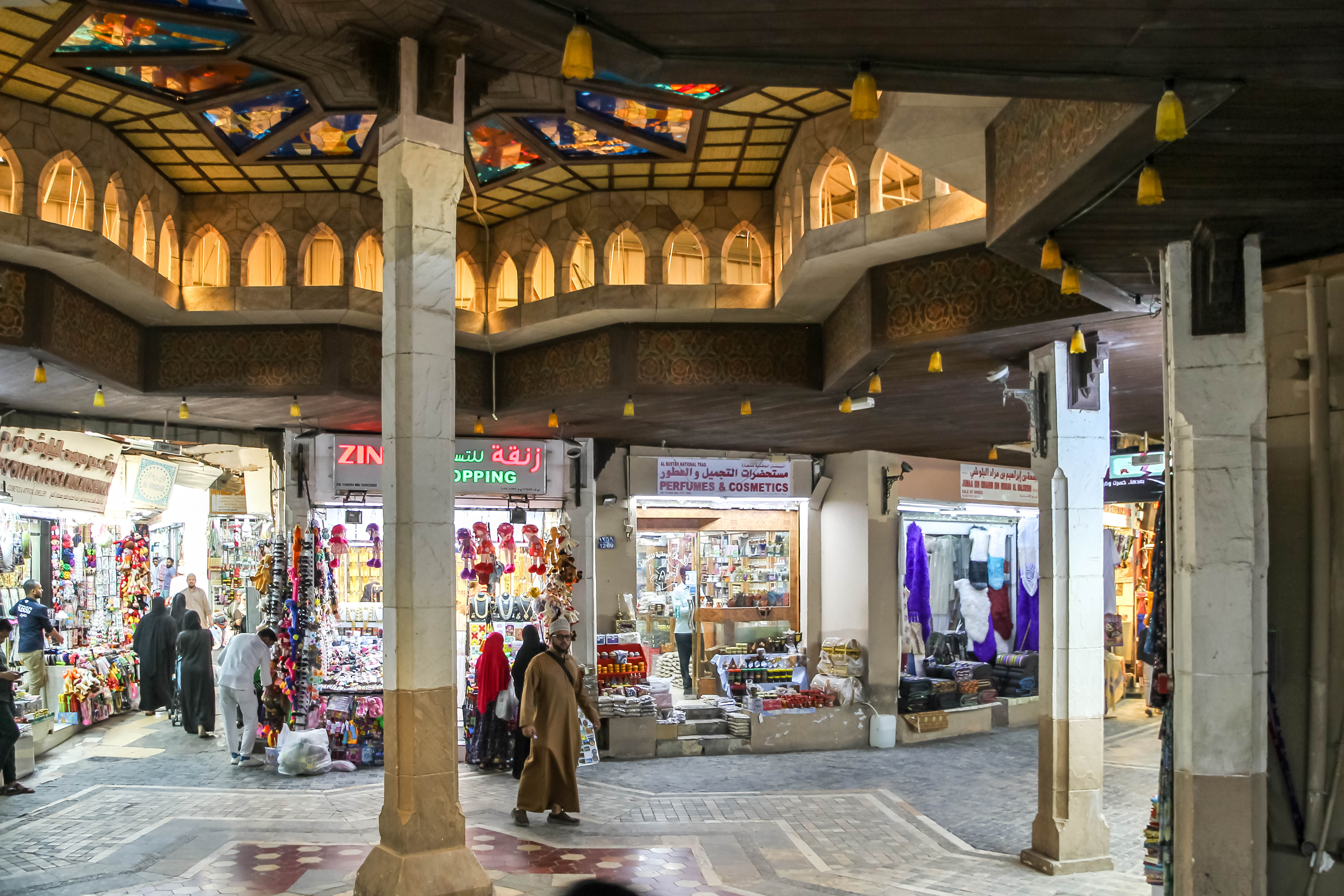
Traditional souqs like this one at Muttrah are very common in Oman and have formed the bulk of the Omani economy in the past.

Oman liberalized its markets in an effort to accede to the World Trade Organization (WTO) and gained membership in 2000. The Director of the Sultanate of Oman's delegation to the WTO is Hilda al-Hinai. Further, on 20 July 2006 the U.S. Congress approved the US-Oman Free Trade Agreement. This took effect on 1 January 2009, eliminating tariff barriers on all consumer and industrial products. It also provides strong protections for foreign businesses investing in Oman.

The government also undertook some important policy measures during 2018 with the establishment of a commercial arbitration center, the adoption of a new commercial companies' law, and a further streamlining of licensing processes through Invest Easy in order to improve the business and investment climate and promote private sector-led growth in the Sultanate.

Oman's economy and revenues from petroleum products have enabled Oman's dramatic development over the past 50 years. Notably however, Oman is not a member of OPEC, although it has coordinated with the group in recent years.

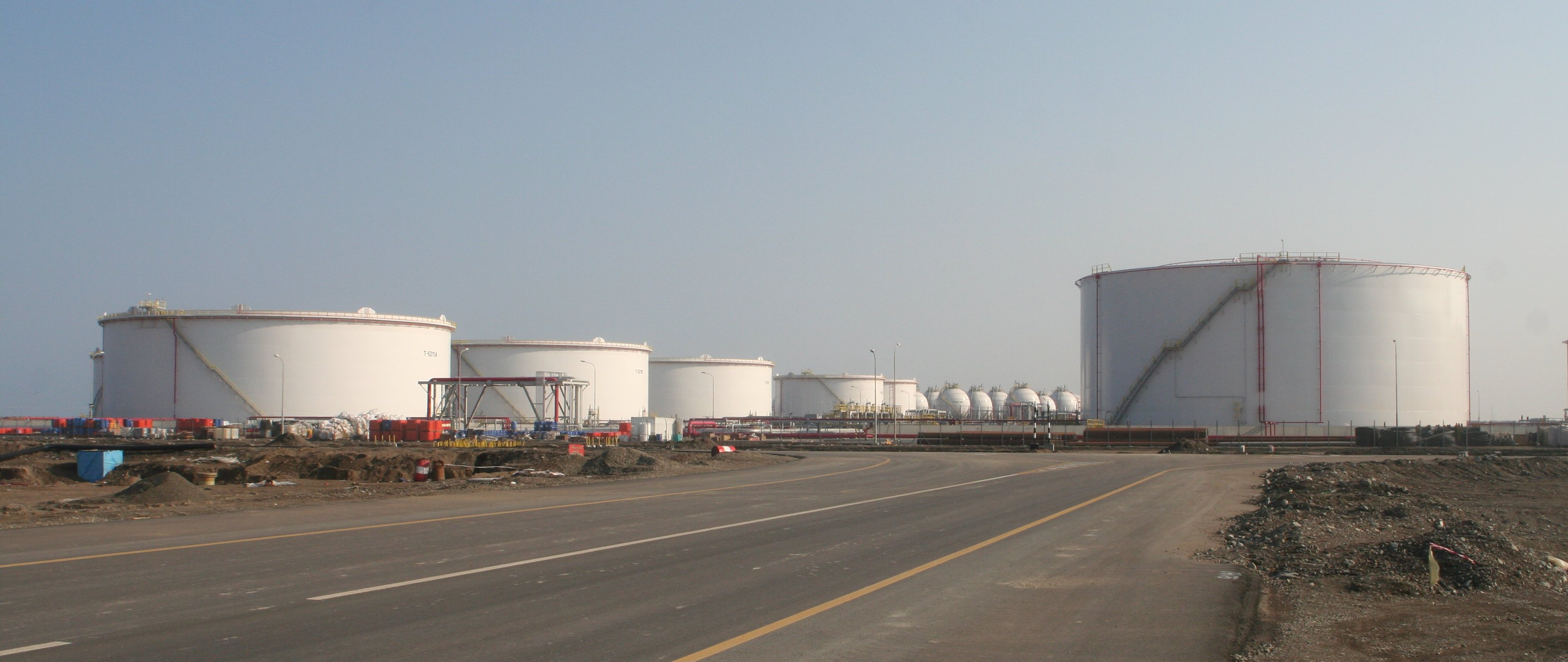
Petrochemical tanks in Sohar

Oil was first discovered in the interior near Fahud in the western desert in 1964. Petroleum Development Oman (PDO) began production in August 1967. The Omani Government owns 60% of PDO, and foreign interests own 40% (Royal Dutch Shell owns 34%; the remaining 6% is owned by Compagnie Francaise des Petroles [Total] and Partex). In 1976, Oman's oil production rose to 366,000 barrels (58,000 m^{3}) per day (b/d) but declined gradually to about 285,000 barrels (45,000 m^{3}) per day in late 1980 due to the depletion of recoverable reserves. From 1981 to 1986, Oman compensated for declining oil prices, by increasing production levels to 600,000 b/d. With the collapse of oil prices in 1986, however, revenues dropped dramatically. Production was cut back temporarily in coordination with the Organization of Petroleum Exporting Countries (OPEC), and production levels again reached 600,000 b/d by mid-1987, which helped increase revenues. By mid-2000, production had climbed to more than 900,000 b/d where they remain. Natural gas reserves, which increasingly provide the fuel for power generation and desalination, stand at 18 trillion ft^{3} (510 km^{3}). The Oman LNG processing plant located in Sur was opened in 2000, with production capacity of 6.6 million tons/YR, as well as unsubstantial gas liquids, including condensates.

Oman's 10th five-year plan (2020–2025) is the first implementation plan of Vision 2040, and will focus its efforts towards achieving economic diversification. The plan for economic diversification aims to move Oman away from the oil-and-gas-based sources of income, and has earmarked five sectors that have high growth potential and economic returns. These are agriculture and fisheries, manufacturing, logistics and transport, energy and mining, and tourism.

According to the Central Bank of Oman's Annual Report 2018, the Omani crude oil price averaged at US$69.7 a barrel in 2018 as compared to US$51.3 per barrel during 2017. The recovery in oil prices also contributed to growth in non-oil economic activities, reflecting inter-linkages, although the dependency of non-oil activities on oil activities has somewhat weakened in the last few years.

According to the World Bank growth is expected to increase over 2020–21, driven in part by a large increase in gas production from the new Khazzan gas project, and infrastructure spending plans in both oil and non-oil sectors. Notably, with Khazzan phase-I becoming operational, the natural gas under the petroleum sector is also emerging as a significant contributor to the Omani economy, with BP committing to invest US$16 Billion developing the field. Meanwhile, the Special Economic Zone Authority of Duqm (SEZAD) attracted $14.2 billion worth of investments in the form of usufruct agreements signed till the end of 2018. With a land area of 2,000 km^{2} and 70 km of coastline along the Arabian Sea, the Duqm Special Economic Zone is the largest in the Middle East and North Africa region and ranks among the largest in the world. Duqm is an integrated economic development composed of zones: a sea port, industrial area, new town, fishing harbor, tourist zone, a logistics center and an education and training zone, all of which are supported by a multimodal transport system that connects it with nearby regions.

On the fiscal front, government expenditure also increased noticeably in 2018 due to higher spending on oil & gas production, defence, subsidies and elevated interest payments. The government debt also increased to RO 14,492 in 2018 – with the debt to GDP ratio expected increased to 58 percent by 2020, leading to constraints on the ability of fiscal spending to support growth and raising sustainability concerns.

== Economic sectors ==
=== Agriculture ===
Agriculture in Oman has been important for centuries. The government's economic development policy emphasizes the expansion of such non-oil sectors as agriculture, fishing, industry, and mining in its bid to diversify the economy and diminish its dependence on oil exports. The goal is to establish a sustainable economic base in preparation for the time when hydrocarbon reserves are depleted. The government launched several economic campaigns, naming 1988 and 1989 as Years of Agriculture and 1991 and 1992 as Years of Industry. Through these campaigns, the government has encouraged private-sector investment by allocating generous amounts of cash support for private industry to be disbursed mainly through official development banks. For example, the Oman Bank for Agriculture and Fisheries, created in 1981, extends loans at concessionary rates to individuals for whom farming or fishing is the principal activity. The bank acts as a distributive institution, receiving an interest subsidy from the government. In 1990 there were 1,308 loans, totaling RO4.7 million. Development programs also incorporate the government's policy of indigenization, with a large component of funds.

=== Mining ===
Several copper mines and a smelter were opened in the early 1980s near Sohar, although production levels have diminished considerably. Chromite and gypsum are also mined in small quantities, with the latter mainly mined at Shuwaymiya mine. Coal deposits at Al Kamil have been explored for potential exploitation and use to generate electricity.

=== Energy ===
Energy use in Oman was 381 TWh in 2020, almost double the consumption in 2010.

=== Industries ===
Oman's non-petroleum manufactures include non-metallic mineral products, foods, and chemicals and chemical products. Industrial development, virtually nonexistent before 1970, has since been oriented toward projects that improve the country's infrastructure, such as electric generators, desalinization complexes and cement plants outside Muscat and Salalah.

An example of Oman’s development of non-oil industries is the luxury fragrance house Amouage, founded in 1983 by Sayyid Hamad bin Hamoud Al Busaidi. The company was established to promote Omani perfumery traditions internationally.

=== Education ===
Education in Oman is provided free of charge up to end of secondary education, though attendance is not mandatory at any level. In 1970 there were only three formal schools with 900 students in the whole state. Oman's national educational programme expanded rapidly during the 1970s and the 1980s, with the Kingdom of Saudi Arabia sending teachers on its own expense during that time period. In 2006–2007 about 560,000 students attended 1053 public schools. The number of students in private schools is about 65,000. There are also extensive programmes to combat adult illiteracy. Sultan Qaboos University, the only national university near Muscat, was founded in 1986, and in 2006 it had 13,500 students. The Human Development Report found the literacy rate to be 93.0% in adults, up from 54.7% in 1990. For the same period, the youth literacy rate increased from 85.6 to 97.3%. Public expenditure on education was reported to be 4.6% of GDP and 26.1% of total government spending.

=== Healthcare ===
Omani nationals have free access to the country's public healthcare, though expatriates typically seek medical care in private sector clinics and hospitals. Generally, the standard of care in the public sector is high for a middle-income country. Oman now has very low rate of once common communicable diseases such as measles and typhoid. Due to rapidly increasing incomes and changing lifestyles and diet, the levels of non-communicable diseases such as cardiovascular disease and diabetes are an increasing problem.

The hospitals in Oman generally provide a high quality of health care. Most of the largest and most advanced hospitals and health centres are located in Muscat, such as the Royal Hospital of Oman and the Sultan Qaboos University Hospital.

Life expectancy in Oman

Though the Omanis have a high life expectancy of 73.8 the nation's medical industry can not be compared to other more developed countries. Still the government is trying to develop this sector and encourage students to study medicine. Although a sizeable portion of the healthcare workforce is foreign born, due to an aggressive government policy of Omanization, this is beginning to change. The country now has an accredited medical university and many Omani doctors have obtained their medical training in countries such as Australia, Canada, the United Kingdom and the United States.

=== Telecommunications ===
Oman Telecommunication Company (Omantel) has a monopoly in the landline telephone and internet access markets. Its arm Omanmobile offers mobile services. The Omani government owns 70% of Omantel after 30% was listed for the public in 2005. In 2005 Qatar Telecommunication Company (Qtel) and partners were awarded the second license to offer mobile services in the country under the brand of Nawras, which was rebranded as Ooredoo (Ooredoo Oman). Oman now has 5 mobile networks offering internet. The networks providing 4G coverage are Oman mobile, Ooredoo, Renna, RedBull Mobile and Friendi.

In 2020, Omantel introduced its first 5G coverage in the country.

In October 2007, the government overhauled Omantel board of directors and announced its plan to remerge the two arm of the company and to sell part of its share to a strategic partner. The government also slashed the royalty fee paid on revenue from 12% to 7%.

=== Transport ===
Oman has several ports, most notably Port Sultan Qaboos and Port of Salalah. Muscat International Airport serves as the principal international gateway. Oman Air serves as the government's flagship airline and operates both domestically and internationally. Since the 1970s, a modern network of asphalt and gravel roads has been built up to link all the country's main settlements. The country has no railroads, though plans have been underway since 2008 to build a nationwide rail network slated to connect to a regional rail network among GCC member states and the Hafeet Rail with the UAE.

=== Tourism ===
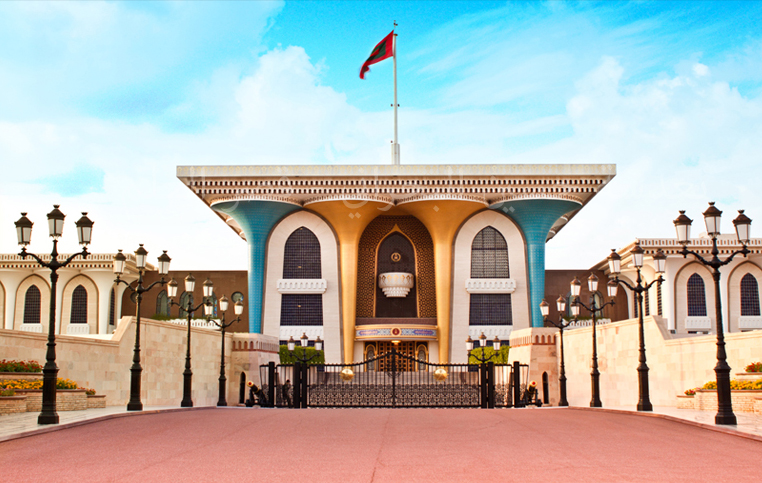
Al-Alam Palace is one of the most famous landmarks in Oman

Oman is a country on the Arabian Peninsula. Tourism in Oman grew considerably during the 2000s, and a 2013 report predicted that it would become one of the largest industries in the nation. In 2019, Oman attracted about 4.1 million visitors from around the world, a massive increase from 3.1 million in 2017 as per the 2019 Tourism Statistic Bulletin from the National Centre for Statistics and Information (NCSI), Oman. By the end of 2025 visitor arrivals had reached about 3.9 million, an increase of 1.8 per cent on 2024, according to the centre's December 2025 tourism indicators report.

Oman has various tourist attractions, particularly within the realm of cultural tourism. Muscat was named the best city to visit in the world by American travel guide publisher Lonely Planet in 2012, and was chosen as the Capital of Arab Tourism of 2012.

== Omanisation ==
The Omanisation programme has been in operation since 1999, working toward replacing expatriates with trained Omani personnel. The goal of this initiative is to provide jobs for the rapidly growing Omani population. The state has allotted subsidies for companies to hire local employees not only to gradually reduce reliance on foreign workers but also to overcome an overwhelming employment preference on the part of Omanis for government jobs.

By the end of 1999, the number of Omanis in government services exceeded the set target of 72%, and in most departments reached 86% of employees. The Ministry has also stipulated fixed Omanisation targets in six areas of the private sector. Most companies have registered Omanisation plans. Since April 1998 a 'green card' has been awarded to companies that meet their Omanisation targets and comply with the eligibility criteria for labour relations. The names of these companies are published in the local press and they receive preferential treatment in their dealings with the Ministry. Academics working on various aspects of Omanisation include Ingo Forstenlechner from United Arab Emirates University and Paul Knoglinger from the FHWien.

Omanisation, however, in the private sector is not always successful. One of the reasons is that jobs are still filled by expatriates because of the lower wages. Studies reveal that an increasing number of the job openings in the private sector pay the official minimum salary for nationals, which is an unattractive employment prospect for the locals. There is also the problem of placing Omani workers in senior positions due to the fact that a significant chunk of the workforce is composed of young and inexperienced workers.

=== Training and Omanisation ===
In order to meet the training and Omanisation requirements of the banking sector, the Omani Institute of Bankers was established in 1983 and has since played a leading role in increasing the number of Omanis working in the sector. The Central Bank monitors the progress made by the commercial banks with Omanisation and in July 1995 issued a circular stipulating that by the year 2000, at least 75% of senior and middle management positions should be held by Omanis. In the clerical grades 95% of staff should be Omanised and 100% in all other grades. At the end of 1999, no less than 98.8% of all positions were held by Omanis. Women made up 60% of the total. During 2001 the percentage of Omanis employed at senior and middle management levels went up from 76.7% to 78.8%. There was a slight increase in the clerical grade percentage to 98.7%, while the non-clerical grades had already reached 100% Omanisation in 1998. The banking sector currently employs 2,113 senior and middle managers supported by 4,757 other staff.

The Ministry has issued a decision regulating tourist guides, who in future will be required to have a license. This Ministerial decision aims at encouraging professionalism in the industry as well as providing career opportunities for Omanis who will be encouraged to learn foreign languages so as to replace foreign tour guides. In January 1996, a major step forward in the training of Omanis in the hotel industry came with the opening of the National Hospitality Institute (NHI). The institute is a public company quoted on the Omani Stock exchange. In February 1997, the first batch of 55 male and female trainees, sponsored by the Vocational Training Authority, were awarded their first level certificates and were given on-the-job training in several hotels. In May 1999, the fourth batch of 95 trainees obtained their NVQs, bringing the number of Omanis trained by the institute to around 450. Omanis now make up 37% of the 34,549 employees in the hotel and catering business, which exceeds the Omanisation target of 30% set by the Government. The NHI has also trained catering staff from the Sultan's Armed Forces and has launched a two-year tour guide course, which includes language training, safe driving, first aid and a knowledge of local history and geography.

In 2025 Oman become the first country in the Gulf to impose a personal income tax. Oman, will impose a 5% tax on taxable income for individuals earning over 42,000 Omani rials ($109,091) per year starting from 2028.

== Trade ==
Exports of Oman by product category (2019) Chemical products Transportation Machines Mineral products Plastics and rubbers Metals Foodstuffs Precious metals Textiles Instruments Animal products Vegetable products Paper goods Footwear and headwear Miscellaneous Stone and glass Wood products Animal and vegetable bi-products Animal hides Arts and antiques Weapons

Among the country's major trading partners are the United Arab Emirates, China, Japan, Saudi Arabia and India. Its trade relationship with Qatar increased significantly after 2017, when the latter came under blockade by its neighbors and had sought new trade partners. Crude oil, refined petroleum and natural gas account for most exports, while imports consist mainly of machinery and transport equipment, basic manufactured goods, and foodstuffs. Oman has been a member of the World Trade Organization since 2000, and it enjoys duty-free trade with the other members of the Gulf Cooperation Council and with the United States.

== Investment ==
The stock market capitalisation of listed companies in Oman was valued at $15,269 million in 2005 by the World Bank.

In 2025 Moody's upgraded Oman's long-term issuer and senior unsecured ratings to "Baa3" from "Ba1", due to expectations of continued improvement in debt ratios and resilience to lower oil prices.

In May 2026, Chinese company Zhongke Electric began construction of a $1 billion plant in Oman's Sohar Free Zone to produce anode materials for lithium‑ion batteries. The facility will have an annual production capacity of up to 200,000 tonnes and is part of Oman's strategy to become a regional hub for clean energy industries.

== Macro-economic trend ==
This is a chart of trend of the gross domestic product (total and per capita) of Oman at market prices sourced from the International Monetary Fund.

Year	Gross Domestic Product (in millions US$)	Per capita income	
Year	Gross Domestic Product (in millions US$)	(US$)	(as % of USA)
1980	6,342	4,674	38.16
1985	10,395	6,129	34.65
1990	11,686	6,341	27.33
1995	13,803	6,355	22.84
2000	19,450	8,097	22.97
2005	30,905	11,806	27.70
2010	58,814	23,351	49.88
2015	81,550	24,024	43.03

== See also ==
- List of companies of Oman
- Corruption in Oman
- Central Bank of Oman
- Ministry of Commerce and Industry (Oman)
- Ministry of Finance (Oman)
- Oman Investment Authority
- Omani rial
- Omran Company
- Public Authority for Special Economic Zones and Free Zones
- Sharakah
- Sultan Haitham City
- Trade unions in Oman
- Economy of the Middle East
