= Telecommunications in Oman =

Oman Telecommunication Company (Omantel) has a monopoly in the landline telephone and internet access markets. Its arm Omanmobile offers mobile services. The Omani government owns 70% of Omantel after 30% was listed for the public in 2005. In 2005 Qatar Telecommunication Company (Qtel) and partners were awarded the second license to offer mobile services in the country under the brand of Nawras, which was rebranded as Ooredoo (Ooredoo Oman). Oman now has 5 mobile networks offering internet. The networks providing 4G coverage are Oman mobile, Ooredoo, Renna, RedBull Mobile and Friendi.

In 2020, Omantel introduced its first 5G coverage in the country.

In October 2007, the government overhauled Omantel board of directors and announced its plan to remerge the two arm of the company and to sell part of its share to a strategic partner. The government also slashed the royalty fee paid on revenue from 12% to 7%.

== Telephone ==
Country Code: 00968

Market Summary (May 2020)

Landlines : 585,018

Mobile cellular: 6,111,896 [Prepaid (5,293,257) – Postpaid (818,639) ]

Fixed Broadband : 487,733

International Gateway : Omantel, Ooredoo, Telecom Oman (TeO), Connect Arabia

Domestic: open wire, microwave, radiotelephone communications, limited coaxial cable and a domestic satellite system with 8 earth stations. International: satellite earth stations - 2 Intelsat (Indian Ocean) and 1 Arabsat.

== Internet ==
Country code (Top level domain): OM

=== Fixed Internet Service (May 2020) ===
Narrowband Internet Subscriptions: 2,021

Broadband Subscriptions : 487,733

ADSL services were launched in 2005 in Oman through the provider Omantel. As of 2020 there are 3 service providers for Broadband in Oman - Omantel, Ooredoo & Awasr

=== Mobile Broadband ===
Both Omantel and Ooredoo offer access to the internet through their 4G network coverage. In addition, Renna Mobile and RedBull Mobile offer 4G internet using Omantel network, while Friendi mobile offers 4G network using Ooredoo network

== Television ==
Broadcast stations: 13 (plus 25 low-power repeaters) (1999) Televisions: 1.6 million (1997)

== Radio ==
Broadcast stations: AM 3, FM 9, shortwave 2 (1999) Radios: 1.4 million (1997)

In April, 2008, Nokia Siemens was appointed to replace parts of the existing radio network.

== See also ==
- Omantel
- Ooredoo Oman
- Telecom Oman (TeO)
- Renna Mobile
- RedBull Mobile
- .om
