= Oman Sports TV =

Oman Sports TV قناة عمان الرياضية
- Country: Oman
- Broadcast area: Worldwide, via satellite and internet
- Headquarters: Muscat, Oman

Programming
- Languages: English, Arabic

History
- Launched: 2008; 18 years ago

Links
- Website: gov.om/omantvsport

Availability

Streaming media
- Live stream: part.gov.om/omantvsport/english/

Oman Sports TV (Arabic: قناة عمان الرياضية) is an Omani satellite television channel based in Muscat, Oman. The channel was launched in 2008 and is owned by Sultanate of Oman Television.

== See also ==
- Television in Oman
