= Mass media in Oman =

The Sultanate of Oman, established on August 9, 1970, is an absolute monarchy in which all the power resides with the sultan. The government controls what information the mass media relays, and the law prohibits any criticism of the Sultan or government.

In November 1974, Oman TV began broadcasting news broadcasts, government announcements, children's shows and nature programs. Though Articles 29, 30 and 31 of the Basic Statute of Oman calls for freedom of the press and freedom of expression, there is some underlying material including "public discord, violates the security of the state, or abuses a person's dignity or rights," which complicates the meaning of the law. The Basic Statute, founded in 1996, is the foundation of the government and has only been modified once in 2011.

The 1984 Press and Publications Law has more rules and regulations than any country in the Arab world. The media is heavily controlled and libel is a criminal offense. To combat freelance journalism, journalists have to apply as employees "of a specific outlet" as of 2005. With the Telecommunications Act in place, people can be prosecuted if they communicate against the operations of society. Because of the many regulations, all media is monitored and advertising is prohibited on radio and television.

== Television and broadcast journalism ==
Television in the Sultanate of Oman, including broadcast journalism, began in 1974 and largely focused on the capital city of Muscat. Coverage expanded to other parts of the country in 1975. Private television companies were prohibited in Oman for 30 years until the Sultan Qaboos bin Said al Said announced a "royal decree" that lifted prohibition on private television in 2004. In 2009, five years after the royal decree, the first private television station began, called Majan TV. As of 2015, Majan TV was the only privately run television station in Oman according to the BBC media profile of Oman, and there were only two other television stations including the most popular Sultanate of Oman Television, Oman TV. It is allowed to use satellites to reach stations from Saudi Arabia, the United Arab Emirates and Yemen.

Oman TV channels are controlled and regulated by the government through the Ministry of Information. Criticisms of the government, or the Sultan, are not taken lightly. In 2004, two Omani intellectuals called the government reforms a way to improve the image of Oman across the globe, on a program on the Iranian TV channel Al-Alam. Following this, the Omani Ministry of Information banned interviews or any sort of publication with the two Omani intellectuals across all media platforms. While it isn't normal for Omani TV to televise political debates, Omani media did cover a political trial in 2005, where 30-to-40 Omanis were accused "of conspiring to overthrow the Sultan's rule by organizing an Ibadi religious group".

== Print journalism ==
Print journalism in Oman has been a delicate business for many decades. Much like many other facets of Omani journalism, print journalism is monitored and necessarily controlled by the Ministry of Information. The Ministry does little to hide the fact, with article 12 of Royal Decree No. 49, created in 1984, stating "Before publishing any publication, the Printer shall obtain permission in advance from the Ministry of Information approving the publication.” Because of this decree, print publications, such as Alwatan and Al Shabiba, have an extremely hard time gaining any credibility.

This fear has come to fruition too, with plenty of journalists being arrested in the 21st century alone. In August 2016, the high-ranking editors of the newspaper Azamn were detained: Editor-in-Chief Ibrahim al-Maamari, Deputy Editor Yousif al-Haj and Editor Zaher al-Abri. The three were detained after being linked to an article on July 26 of that year, in which al-Maamari published an article accusing unnamed Omani officials of influencing the Chief Magistrate of the Supreme Court at the Ministry of Justice, Ishaq Bin Ahmed Al Bousaidi, in a case involving an inheritance dispute. Following a second article being published soon after, the Ministry of Information ordered Azamn to stop all publications. Soon after, the website URL which originally linked to Azamn's homepage was unavailable, and instead redirected to pictures of the three arrested journalists.

== Radio ==
Radio broadcasting in Oman began in 1970 with the stations Radio Sultanate of Oman and Radio Salalah, partly in an effort to counteract anti-Oman propaganda originating from the Marxist country of South Yemen. Initial plans for a radio station began in the 1950s, with talks between the Omani and British government. These specific plans never came to fruition, limiting the scope of radio in Oman to a single Land Rover used to broadcast important alerts from the city of Muttrah. As of 2000, there were 1.4 million radios in the country, being broadcast from 14 stations. Listeners have access to a variety of programs broadcast in both Arabic and English, ranging from contemporary musical hits to readings of the Quran. Broadcast journalism is another prevalent force over the airwaves, with a 2017 survey reporting that 29.8 percent of journalists sampled work in radio.

Nearly all media is controlled and funded by the Omani government. Radio broadcasts are overseen by the director general of radio, who reports directly to Oman's Minister of Information. Following the Sultan's 2004 royal decree establishing the legality of private radio and television stations, citizens could now apply for a 10-year license granting them the ability to operate independent stations. This led to the establishment of Hala FM, Oman's first privately owned radio station in 2009. The Omani government is strict in what it allows to be broadcast, though it has loosened its grip in recent years. After a period of civil unrest, several call-in programs started broadcasting out of the capital. These programs allow citizens to share their thoughts on what Oman needs.

== Prominent News Outlets in Oman ==
=== Press ===
- Al-Watan – Arabic daily
- Oman Daily – Arabic daily
- Azamn – Arabic daily
- Shabiba – Arabic daily
- Al-roya – business
- The Week – English-language
- Oman Observer – English-language
- Times of Oman – English-language
- Muscat Daily – English-language
- The Arabian Stories – English-language
- Oman Tribune – English language daily, publishes articles from The New York Times, Harvard Business Review and other sources
- Muwatin - English language magazine

=== Television ===
- Oman TV – state-run
- Majan TV – Muscat-based private channel

=== Radio ===
- Radio Oman – state-run, Arabic and English-language networks
- Hala FM – private, Arabic music
- Al-Wisal – private, Arabic music
- Hi FM – private, English-language
- Muscat FM - private, Arabic
- T FM - private, English
- Merge 104.8 - private, English
- Virgin Radio Oman 100.9 - private, English

=== News Agency ===
- Oman News Agency – official, English-language pages
- WAF News Agency – Independent, Arabic and English https://wafoman.com
