= Corruption in Oman =

Despite recent progress, corruption in Oman remains a significant issue. According to Transparency International, Oman ranked 52nd out of 182 territories in the 2025 Corruption Perceptions Index, where the country ranked first is perceived to have the most honest public sector.

== Corruption scandals ==
Corruption cases in Oman are concentrated in the public sector, with frequent reports of officials engaged in bribery, nepotism, and favoritism. In 2010 alone, civil servants were included in the more than 20 individuals prosecuted for corruption in Oman. One prominent example of bribery involved Mohammed Ali, the former managing director of Galfar Engineering and Contracting. He was sentenced to 15 years imprisonment after he was found guilty of paying bribes in exchange for contracts from a state-owned oil company. This corruption case also involved Juma al-Hinai, a Finance Ministry official, who also served as the head of Petroleum Development of Oman’s tenders committee.

Another recent bribery case involved Ahmad al-Wahaibi. He was sentenced to 23 years in prison for accepting an $8 million bribe from the Korean company, LG International in exchange for securing a multi-billion petrochemical project in Sohar, Oman. This case also implicated Adel al-Raisi, who was a former aide to the then Economy Ministry. He was sentenced to 10 years imprisonment for facilitating bribery made by a senior official.

=== Wasta ===
Wasta, a common practice in the Middle East, involves leveraging personal connections to influence or achieve goals in areas such as employment, business, and access to services. It also persists in Oman and is closely linked to corruption as demonstrated in several cases of nepotism. In 2016, the country’s newspaper Azamn reported that several high-ranking officials were involved in nepotism. It accused these officials of employing their children in different government departments. It was alleged that a senior minister asked the Ministry of Civil Service to accept the application of the children of a group of top officials outside of the established procedures of employment in the government.

Wasta is also evident in cases of favoritism involving individuals and companies selected in Oman’s public procurement processes. There are instances when contracts are awarded to those who have personal connections to government officials. By 2018, Oman’s Public Prosecution office recorded 1,144 cases of misuse of power and these are often linked to this practice.

== Anti-corruption measures ==
To address corruption, particularly after it became one of the root causes of the Omani Spring, Oman’s government has instituted a number of measures and initiatives. For example, in 2011, the Anti-Corruption Law was enacted and it provided legal measures that serve as the basis for prosecuting corrupt officials. In the same year, the National Anti-Corruption Authority was also formed and it was given the authority to investigate and prosecute corruption cases. Its mandate included the promotion and transparency in the public sector. A cabinet reshuffle was also instituted after the protesters demanded the removal of cabinet ministers.

The country also ratified the United Nations Convention Against Corruption (UNCAC) in 2013 and the Arab Anti-Corruption Convention. Part of its commitment to these treaties was the establishment of the State Audit Institution (SAI), which oversees and implements anti-corruption policies. It also conducts audits to ensure compliance with anti-corruption laws, such as those recently introduced to bolster its anti-corruption efforts. These include the Law on Combating Money Laundering and Terrorism Financing as well as the Penal, which strengthened the anti-corruption legal framework.

Part of the anti-corruption reform was the move towards increased transparency. The sultanate’s budget, for example, is now accessible to the public, with the expectation that it would ensure accountability and increase public trust in the way public funds are spent.

=== Challenges ===
The anti-corruption measures in Oman have been described as lacking in momentum and reactive, leading to diminished public trust and impaired good governance. It is also noted that while measures improving transparency have been instituted, improvements are still needed in the following areas: budget proposal’s accessibility is made publicly available within a reasonable period; transparency in the finances of state-owned enterprises; access to the expenditure of executive offices; and, the supreme audit institution does not yet meet international standards, among others.

== International rankings ==
In Transparency International's 2025 Corruption Perceptions Index, Oman scored 52 on a scale from 0 ("highly corrupt") to 100 ("very clean"). When ranked by score, Oman ranked 54th among the 182 countries in the Index, where the country ranked first is perceived to have the most honest public sector. For comparison with regional scores, the best score among Middle Eastern and North African countries (Note: Algeria, Bahrain, Egypt, Iran, Iraq, Israel, Jordan, Kuwait, Lebanon, Libya, Morocco, Oman, Qatar, Saudi Arabia, Syria, Tunisia, United Arab Emirates, and Yemen) was 69, the average was 39 and the worst was 13. For comparison with worldwide scores, the best score was 89 (ranked 1), the average was 42, and the worst was 9 (ranked 181 in a two-way tie).
