= National symbols of Oman =

The national symbols of Oman are official and unofficial flags, icons or cultural expressions that are emblematic, representative or otherwise characteristic of Oman and of its culture.

== Symbol ==
Title	Name of Symbol	Picture
National flag	Flag of Oman	
Coat of arms	National emblem of Oman	
National anthem	As-Salam as-Sultani. English: Salute to The Sultan.	As-Salam as-Sultani
National flower	Jasmine	
National bird	Barbary Falcon	
National animal	Arabian oryx	
