= Sultanate of Oman Television =

National broadcaster of Oman

Oman TV
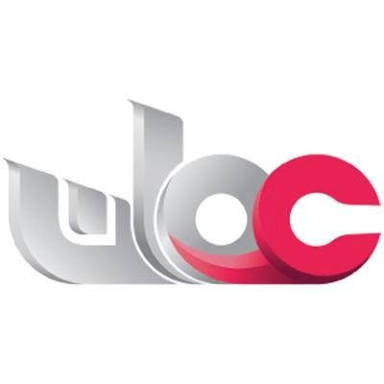
- Type: Television
- Country: Oman
- Availability: National; International
- Owner: Public Authority for Radio and TV of Oman
- Launch date: 17 November 1974 (television)
- Official website: part.gov.om

Oman TV (Arabic: تلفزيون سلطنة عمان) is the national television channel broadcaster in the Sultanate of Oman. The channel began broadcasting from the city of Muscat on 17 November 1974, using Intelsat, and from Salalah on 25 November 1975. Since 1997, Oman TV has broadcast its programs through its website. An agreement with Leitch was done in March 2006 to add its Nexio server system; a second channel and a conversion to high-definition broadcasts were also planned.

The Oman TV network has three other channels in Oman Mubasher, Oman HD and the recently launched Oman Cultural channel. The channel features news broadcasts, government announcements, children's shows, and nature programs. Sports programmes, news and matches can be watched on the Oman Sports TV channel.

== History ==
Following the 1970 coup, the Sultanate of Oman was negotiating the creation of a television channel.

== Availability ==
Oman TV broadcasts its programs internationally through the following satellites:

- Arabsat 5C
- AsiaSat 5
- Badr 6
- Eutelsat 7 West A
- Eutelsat Hot Bird 13C
- Galaxy 19
- Hispasat 1D
- Nilesat 201
- Optus D2

== Digital Studio Complex inauguration and new brand launch ==
Assigned by His Majesty Sultan Qaboos Bin Said, Sayyid Taimour bin Asa’ad bin Tariq al-Said, Assistant Secretary General for International Cooperation at The Research Council opened the digital studio complex of the Public Authority for Radio and Television (PART) at Madinat Al Ialam, on 31 December 2015.

The new complex comes with the latest high-quality digital broadcasting technologies.

The building has four floors and combines modernity and architectural heritage of Oman. The systems, networks and devices in the complex are designed using the latest technologies in the field of production and television broadcast.

The new compound is a significant and advanced step for radio and television broadcasting in the Sultanate.

The new building includes four large digital studios to produce dramas and various programmes. The areas of the studios range between 200 and 700 square metres. The complex includes a news centre that consists of a main hall for editing, designed according to the latest global standards with studio for news bulletins broadcast from inside the hall, as well as three other digital studios for news programmes.

The complex also includes three radio studios for news and three studios for broadcast and a theatre.

The brand of the Public Authority for Radio and its TV and radio channels were also launched in the opening ceremony, in addition to changing their logos and the launch of trial broadcast of Oman Cultural Channel.

The new branding and on-air design was done by three agencies namely Flint Skallen, Perfect Accident and Velvet (which worked on the new idents for Oman TV). Viewers will notice the change right away, as the channels logo has been modernized, dumping the previous style which featured the colors of the national flag and two crossed swords (part of the national emblem). The new logo, using curvy letters, creates a fresh look for the organization and was showcased in some brand promotional videos for the launch. The main news studio features a 6×3 video wall camera center, flanked by two patterned walls which glow blue. These walls feature a unique curved cutout that repeats across the space.

The anchor desk uses a two-toned curved shape atop a pointed riser.

The set features a small pod and a secondary 3×2 video wall, which is used primarily for sports.

The main news studio is located adjacent to the newsroom, with a track camera connecting the two for newscast openings.

Graphically, the networks main bulletins begin with panels of glass revolving in a circle, culminating in a floating layered world map scene. Throughout, layers of maps and micro-text are seen. In segment opens, the panels contain photos, such as for sports. The updated look debuted on 31 December 2015.

== See also ==
- Mass media in Oman
