= Agriculture in Oman =

Agriculture in Oman has been important for centuries. The government's economic development policy emphasizes the expansion of such non-oil sectors as agriculture, fishing, industry, and mining in its bid to diversify the economy and diminish its dependence on oil exports. The goal is to establish a sustainable economic base in preparation for the time when hydrocarbon reserves are depleted. The government launched several economic campaigns, naming 1988 and 1989 as Years of Agriculture and 1991 and 1992 as Years of Industry. Through these campaigns, the government has encouraged private-sector investment by allocating generous amounts of cash support for private industry to be disbursed mainly through official development banks. For example, the Oman Bank for Agriculture and Fisheries, created in 1981, extends loans at concessionary rates to individuals for whom farming or fishing is the principal activity. The bank acts as a distributive institution, receiving an interest subsidy from the government. In 1990 there were 1,308 loans, totaling RO4.7 million. Development programs also incorporate the government's policy of indigenization, with a large component of funds.

== Agriculture ==
Oman has five distinct agricultural regions. Going roughly from north to south, they include the Musandam Peninsula, the Al Batinah coast, the valleys and the high plateau of the eastern region, the interior oases, and Dhofar region, along the narrow coastal strip from the border with Yemen to Ras Naws and the mountains to the north.

In the early 1990s, interior farming areas accounted for more than half of the country's cultivated land. Rainfall, although greater in the interior than along the coast, is insufficient for growing crops. Most of the water for irrigation is obtained through the falaj system, in which a vertical shaft is dug from the surface to reach water in porous rock. From the bottom of this shaft, a gently sloping tunnel is dug to tap the water and allow it to flow to a point on the surface at a lower level or into a cistern or underground pool from which it can be lifted by bucket or pump.

A falaj may be many kilometers in length and require numerous additional vertical shafts to provide fresh air to the workers digging the tunnels and to permit the removal of the excavated rock and soil. A falaj requires tremendous expenditure of labor for maintenance as well as for construction. Because private maintenance efforts during the 1970s and early 1980s proved inadequate, the government initiated repair and maintenance of the falaj system to increase the quantity of water available to cultivated areas.

The cooler climate on the high plateau of the Al Jabal al Akhdar enables the growing of apricots, grapes, peaches, and walnuts. The Al Batinah coastal plain accounts for about two fifths of the land area under cultivation and is the most concentrated farming area of the country. Annual rainfall along the coast is minimal, but moisture falling on the mountains percolates through permeable strata to the coastal strip, providing a source of underground water only about two meters below the surface. Diesel motors are used to pump water for irrigation from these shallow wells.

By the mid-1980s, the water table along the Al Batinah coast had dropped to a low level, and salinity of the wells had increased, significantly reducing the water quality. This was caused by the combined effect of cultivating land too close to the sea and pumping more well water than was being recharged by nature, thereby permitting seawater to encroach.

Overfarming and attendant water problems caused the government to establish the Ministry of Water Resources in 1990 with the mandate of limiting water consumption and improving irrigation. A freeze on new wells was imposed in addition to delimiting several "no drill zones" in areas where groundwater supplies are low. The ministry is also considering the installation of water meters. Recharge dams are designed to hold rainwater in the wadis for a period of time to facilitate the trickling of water down into the ground; replenishing aquifers have been built mainly in the northeastern Al Batinah region, where the groundwater levels are up to five meters below sea level.

Apart from water problems, the agricultural sector has been affected by rural-urban migration, in which the labor force has been attracted to the higher wages of industry and the government service sector, and by competition from highly subsidized producers. As a result, agriculture and fishing have declined in relative sectoral importance. In 1967 the two sectors together contributed about 34 percent of GDP; by 1991 they accounted for 3.8 percent of GDP. The government encourages farming by distributing land, offering subsidized loans to purchase machinery, offering free feedstock, and giving advice on modern irrigation methods. As a result, the area under cultivation has increased, with an accompanying rise in production. But extensive agricultural activity has also depleted freshwater reserves and underground aquifers and has increased salinity.

The area under cultivation increased by almost 18 percent to 57,814 hectares over the period from 1985 to 1990. Fruits were grown on 64 percent, or 36,990 hectares, of the area under cultivation in crop year 1989-90. Dates accounted for 45 percent of the total area, or 70 percent of the area under fruit cultivation. Grains such as barley, wheat, and corn accounted for 19.2 percent, or 11,092 hectares, and vegetables accounted for 16.8 percent, or 9,732 hectares, of the total area under cultivation.

In the same five-year period, overall agricultural production increased by 3 percent to 699,000 tons. Field crops, largely alfalfa, accounted for more than one-half of total production, or 354,300 tons, a 40 percent increase in the five-year period. Fruit production (including dates and limes) was 182,400 tons, up from 154,500 tons. Vegetable production totaled 162,300 tons, an increase of almost 50 percent.

== Fishing ==
Historically, fishing was second only to farming as an economic activity in pre-oil Oman. Both the Gulf of Oman and the Arabian Sea offer a variety of catch, including sardines, bluefish, mackerel, shark, tuna, abalone, lobsters, and oysters. Fishermen harvest their catch in the waters near the coast, using the traditional, small seagoing canoe, to which an outboard motor has been added.

The fishing sector (along with agriculture) is considered one of the most promising areas for commercial attention and accounts for the highest non-oil export revenue. However, sales in 1990 totaled RO17.3 million, dwarfed by oil export earnings of RO1.9 billion. The GCC provided the largest fish export market. The fishing sector also provided employment opportunities to 19,296 fishermen registered in 1990, of whom 18,546 were employed in traditional fisheries and 750 in industrial fisheries. Like agriculture, fishing has been affected by the diminishing number of people employed in the sector. As increasing numbers of fishermen turn to more remunerative employment, there has been a gradual decrease in the amount of fish caught.

The government has stressed modernizing and expanding the fishing industry and developing its export potential. The Joint United States-Oman Commission funded the Oman Fisheries Development and Management Project to strengthen the technical, administrative, and management skills of the Directorate General of Fisheries Resources (DGFR). In strengthening the DGFR, the government hopes to increase private-sector confidence in the fishing industry and, in the long term, to create private-sector- led development of the industry.

The government is following a dual strategy—internally, to improve the capacity of the DGFR to manage Oman's fishing resources and, externally, to provide incentives for fishermen to remain in their occupations. The government provides subsidies to purchase fiberglass boats and outboard engines; to construct workshops, cold storage facilities, and jetties along the coastline; and to establish companies to market fish both domestically and internationally.

== See also ==
- Economy of Oman
