= Geology of Oman =

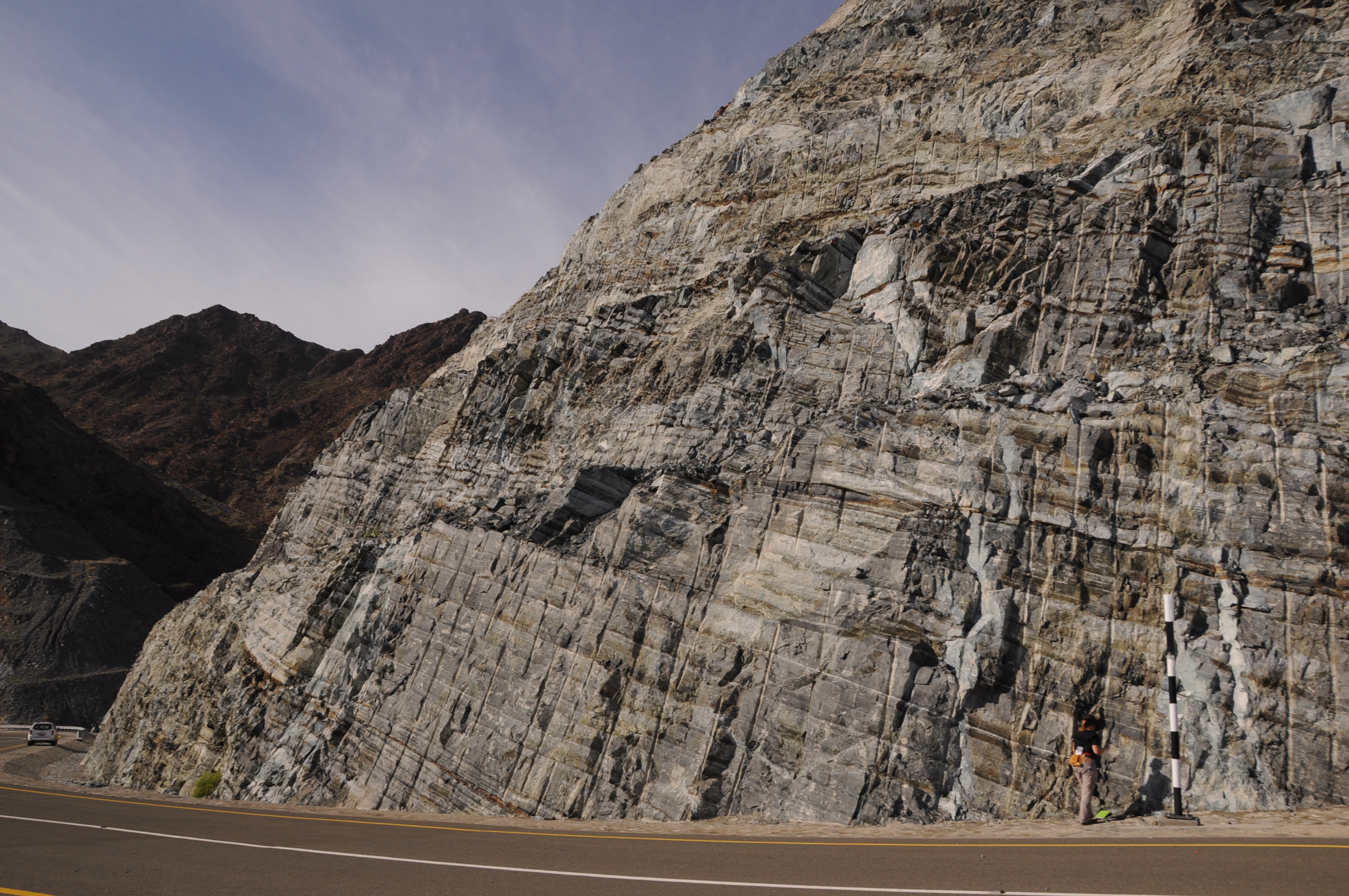
Layered gabbro in Al Batinah Region

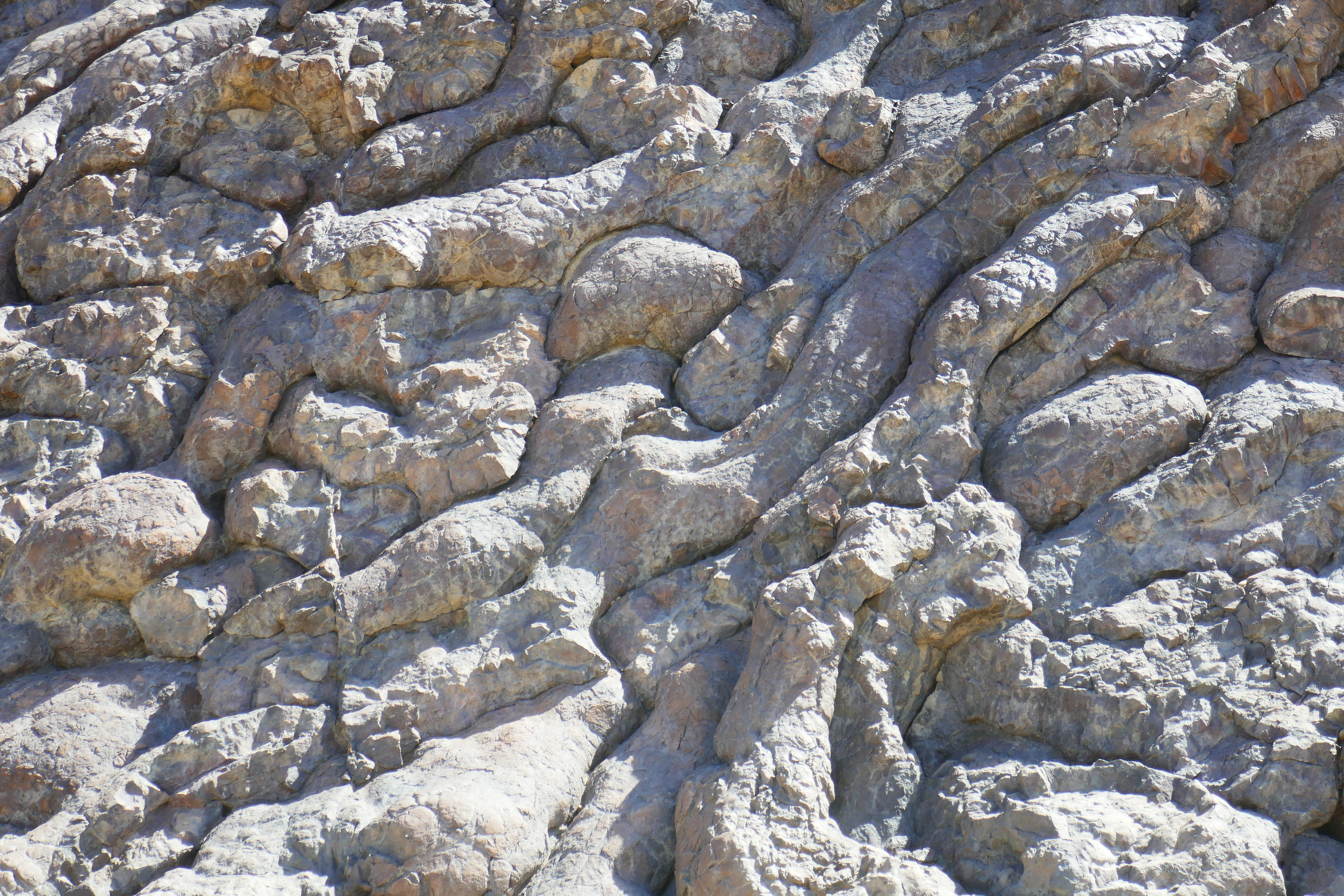
Lava at Wadi Jizzi

The geology of Oman includes varied landscapes which are a blend of its geological history, and its climate over the past few million years. Rock outcrops in the Hajar, Huqf and Dhofar Mountains are a point of interest for international geologists. The rock record spans about 825 million years and includes at least three periods when the country was covered by ice. Oman, located at the southeast corner of the Arabian Plate, is being pushed slowly northward, as the Red Sea grows wider. The lofty Hajar Mountains and the drowned valleys of Musandam are dramatic reminders of this. Generally speaking Oman is fairly quiescent tectonically. Musandan experiences occasional tremors as the Arabian Plate collides with the Eurasian Plate. During the Cretaceous Period Oman was located adjacent to a subduction zone and a portion of the upper mantle along with overlying seafloor volcanic rocks were thrust over the continental crust. This obducted sequence of ultramafic to mafic rocks is the Semail Ophiolite complex. The ophiolite is locally rich in copper and chromite orebodies.

Seismic reflection profiles consisting of magnetic and gravitational data, provide models for the subsurface of the northwestern Oman and northeastern UAE onshore/offshore topography. The data acquired showed that the geology can be separated by Pleistocene, Pliocene, Miocene, Oligocene, Eocene, Paleocene, Cretaceous stratigraphic layers which are underlaid by Ophiolite bodies. The Cretaceous to the early Miocene stratigraphic layers also represent different periods of basin deepening. The process that allowed this deepening was thanks in part to the ophiolite loading. This resulted in normal faulting, permitting accommodation for sediment accumulation.

A study of the cross cutting relationships between the normal faults of the region with various aged sediments indicates that some normal faults formed early on in the history of the subduction zone. Subduction is believed to have begun approximately 104 Mya, becoming self-sufficient around 96-95 Mya. The oldest normal faults are extremely long, ranging from 1-5 km. Research has associated these faults with extensional forces that began once the force of the subducting slab was enough to overcome resistant forces of the lithosphere. This supports the theory of slab-pull subduction, where subduction continues due to the weight of the subducting plate.

The interior plains of Oman are of young sedimentary rocks, wadi gravels, dune sands and salt flats. Beneath them is a several kilometre-thick stack of older sedimentary rocks that host the country's hydrocarbon resources. Ancient salt, which comes to the surface in several salt domes such as Qarat Kibrit, plays an important role in forming many of these oil and gas accumulations.

Oman has become a major destination for geotourism and an increasing number of visitors are attracted by the spectacular outcrops the country has to offer.

== See also ==
- Hills of Masirah Island
- Jebel Hafeet
