= Sharakah =

Fund for Development of Youth Projects (Sharakah)
- Headquarters: Muscat, Oman
- Website: https://www.sharakah.om

Sharakah (Arabic for "Partnership") is a closed-joint stock company incorporated by a Royal Decree in the Sultanate of Oman in 1998. Sharakah provides financial support and post0financial (Advisory and Administrative) to Small and Medium Enterprises (SMEs) in the Sultanate of Oman.

== Behind Sharakah ==
Sharakah’s capital was created by donations of His Majesty Sultan Qaboos Bin Said as well as private sector companies and individuals. Sharakah’s board members comprise Hani M. Al Zubair, Said Salim Al-Sahib, Mohammed Redha A. Jawad, Nasser Salim Al Rashdi, Rashad Jaffar Al-Shaikh, Pankaj Khimji and Qais Al Khonji .

Sharakah is backed by partnerships with key government and non-government organizations within Oman associated with various sectors such as commerce & Industry, Manpower, Education sector, finance, oil and gas, among others.

== Events and news ==
Up until now, Sharakah has participated in various small & medium enterprise programs and conferences of which the latest participation was held at the Middle East Forum in Abu Dhabi, United Arab Emirates in October 2011. In November 2011, Sharakah was a part of the Global Entrepreneurship Week workshop hosted by the U.S. Embassy in Oman. The magazine Ruwad publishes relevant news for entrepreneurs and activities about Sharakah.
