= Hilda al-Hinai =

Omani diplomat

- هيلدا الهنائي
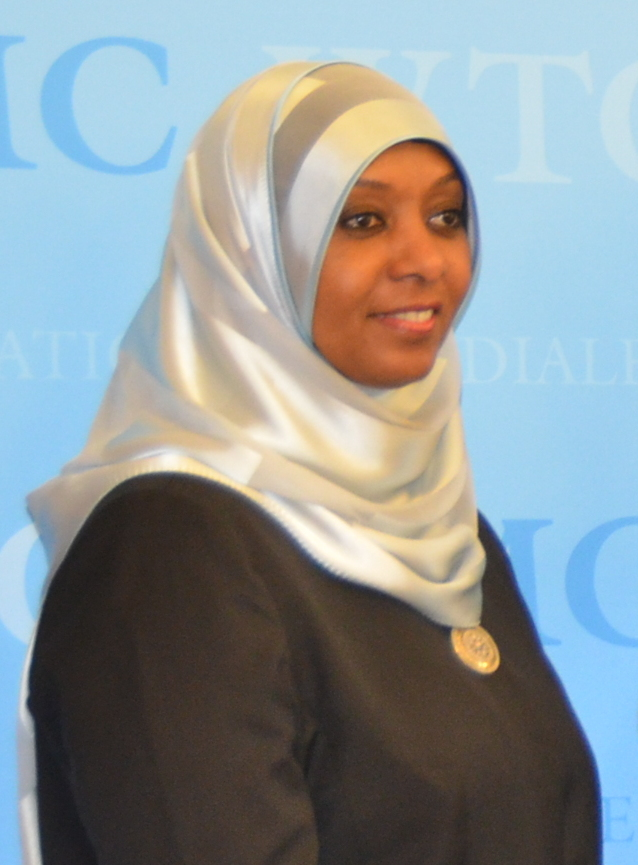
- Citizenship: Oman
- Occupation: Director of the Sultanate Oman's delegation to the World Trade Organisation

Hilda al-Hinai, Arabic: هيلدا الهنائي, is an Omani diplomat and economist, who is Director of the Sultanate of Oman's delegation to the World Trade Organisation (WTO). She has been outspoken about the role of Arab countries within the WTO, and the lack of influence that all Arab states, apart from Saudi Arabia, have within it. She was chair of the working party which enabled the entry of the Seychelles into the WTO. During negotiations, she was praised for working for the interests of the Seychelles rather than the wider WTO organisation itself. She has previously held the role of Deputy Permanent Representative to the Permanent Mission of the Sultanate of Oman to the United Nations.

Al-Hinai has spoken openly about the discrimination she has received in her role, due to her religion and gender. She is an Honorary Member of the Diplomatic Circle of Geneva.
