= Climate of Muscat =

Coordinates: 24°00′N 57°00′E

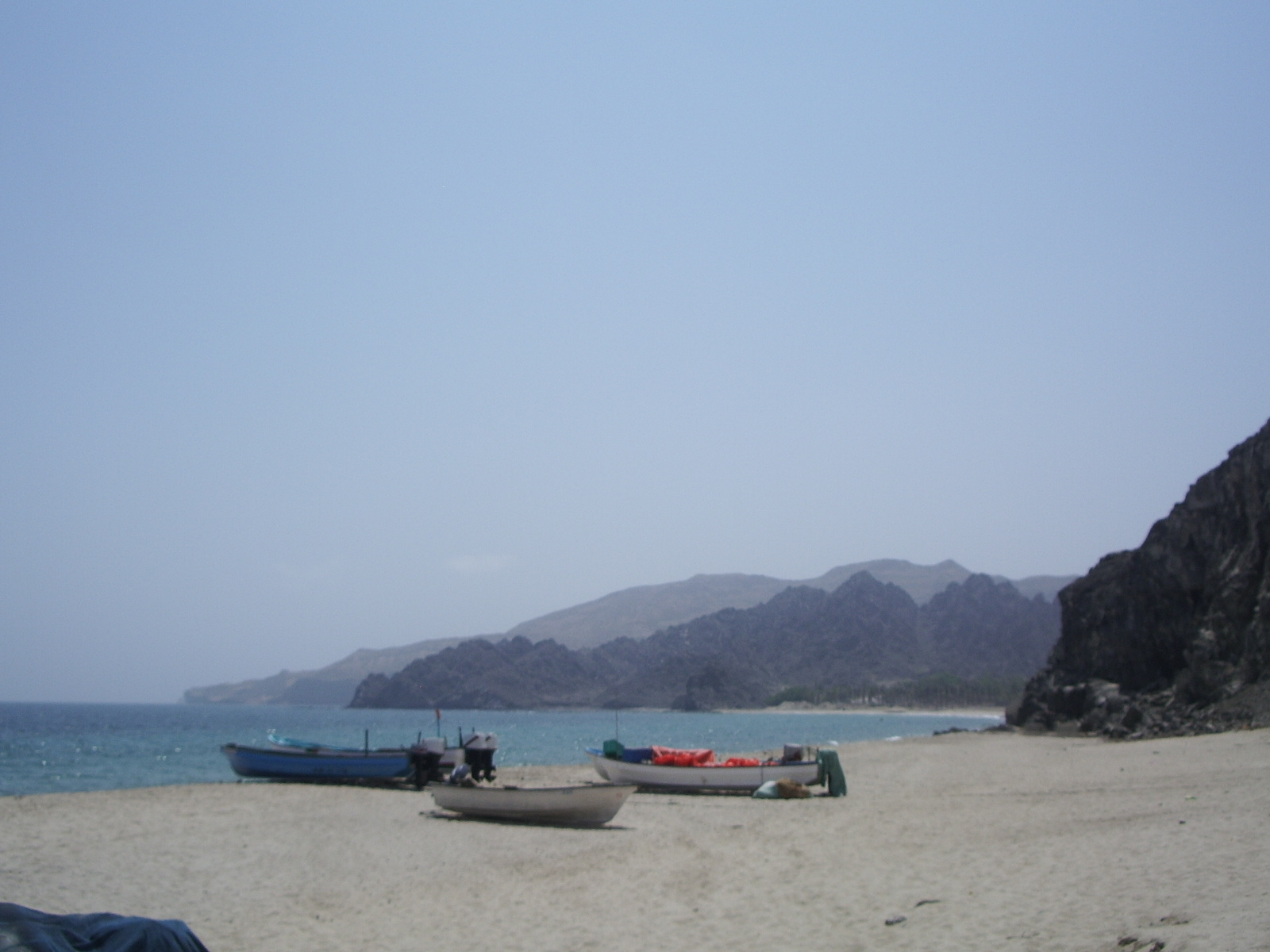
A beach in Muscat

The climate of Muscat features a hot, arid climate with long and very hot summers and warm winters. Annual rainfall in Muscat is about 100 millimetres or 4 inches, falling mostly from November to April. In general, precipitation is scarce in Muscat with several months, on average, seeing only a trace of rainfall. The climate is very hot, with temperatures reaching as high as 49 °C or 120 °F in the summer.

For sightseeing, the best time to visit Muscat is from November to March as the temperatures are moderate and pleasant, making it easy to move around. The daytime temperature in Muscat during the winter season is between 23 and 26 °C (73.4 and 78.8 °F), while mornings will be around 13 to 17 °C (55.4 to 62.6 °F). Between May and September, travel is very exhausting with the average temperature between 31 and 38 °C (87.8 and 100.4 °F) with sunburn and dehydration possible.

Climate data for Muscat
Month	Jan	Feb	Mar	Apr	May	Jun	Jul	Aug	Sep	Oct	Nov	Dec	Year
Record high °C (°F)	34.6 (94.3)	38.2 (100.8)	41.5 (106.7)	44.9 (112.8)	48.3 (118.9)	48.5 (119.3)	49.1 (120.4)	49.2 (120.6)	47.2 (117.0)	43.6 (110.5)	39.4 (102.9)	37.8 (100.0)	49.2 (120.6)
Mean daily maximum °C (°F)	25.5 (77.9)	26.1 (79.0)	29.8 (85.6)	34.7 (94.5)	39.5 (103.1)	40.4 (104.7)	38.6 (101.5)	36.2 (97.2)	36.3 (97.3)	35.0 (95.0)	30.5 (86.9)	27.1 (80.8)	33.3 (92.0)
Daily mean °C (°F)	21.3 (70.3)	21.9 (71.4)	25.2 (77.4)	29.8 (85.6)	34.2 (93.6)	35.2 (95.4)	34.3 (93.7)	32.0 (89.6)	31.4 (88.5)	29.7 (85.5)	25.7 (78.3)	22.6 (72.7)	28.6 (83.5)
Mean daily minimum °C (°F)	17.3 (63.1)	17.6 (63.7)	20.7 (69.3)	24.7 (76.5)	29.1 (84.4)	30.6 (87.1)	30.4 (86.7)	28.4 (83.1)	27.5 (81.5)	24.9 (76.8)	20.9 (69.6)	18.9 (66.0)	24.3 (75.7)
Record low °C (°F)	1.6 (34.9)	2.3 (36.1)	7.0 (44.6)	10.3 (50.5)	17.2 (63.0)	21.6 (70.9)	23.5 (74.3)	21.3 (70.3)	19.0 (66.2)	14.3 (57.7)	9.4 (48.9)	4.5 (40.1)	1.6 (34.9)
Average rainfall mm (inches)	12.8 (0.50)	24.5 (0.96)	15.9 (0.63)	17.1 (0.67)	7.0 (0.28)	0.9 (0.04)	0.2 (0.01)	0.8 (0.03)	0.0 (0.0)	1.0 (0.04)	6.8 (0.27)	13.3 (0.52)	100.3 (3.95)
Average relative humidity (%)	63	64	58	45	42	49	60	67	63	55	60	65	58
Mean monthly sunshine hours	268.6	244.8	278.3	292.5	347.4	325.7	277.7	278.6	303.9	316.9	291.9	267.0	3,493.3
Source: NOAA (1961–1990)

== Factors ==
Muscat being located in the Arabian peninsula features long and very hot summers similar to that of any Middle Eastern country. Rainfall in the city is very rare, mostly falling during winter months.

- Shamal winds occur in Muscat during summer months. They are very dusty and remain at peak in the morning but decrease at night.
- Sandstorm or Dust storm are phenomena which affect Muscat rarely during summer months.
- Westerly winds bring winter showers to many parts of Oman including Muscat, coming from the Mediterranean or North Africa.
- The Southwest Monsoon only affects the Dhofar region of Oman where light rainfall occurs but upper parts of Oman including Muscat remain dry during this period.

== Extreme weather events ==
The most extreme weather events in Oman are tropical storms that form in the Arabian Sea. Following is the list of tropical storms that affected Oman, including Muscat, during the 21st century.

- In 2002, a cyclonic storm hit the Dhofar region of Oman.
- In 2007, a category 5 Cyclone Gonu caused squally winds and rains to the city of Muscat.
- In 2010, a category 4 Cyclone Phet brought massive flooding to Muscat during early June.
