= .om =

Internet country code top-level domain for Oman

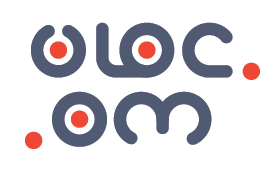
- Introduced: 11 April 1996
- TLD type: Country code top-level domain
- Status: Active
- Registry: Oman Telecommunication Regulatory Authority
- Sponsor: Oman Telecommunication Regulatory Authority
- Intended use: Entities connected with Oman
- Actual use: Popular in Oman; also used in typosquatting due to misspellings of .com domains
- Registry website: Name Administration

.om is the Internet country code top-level domain (ccTLD) for Oman. .om domains are used by less than 0.1% of all websites.

== Registry ==
Currently, the Telecommunications Regulatory Authority is the registry of .om ccTLD. The Authority is solely responsible for the management of the top level Internet domain name ".om" and ".عمان". They are responsible for auto-renewing registered domains. In doing so, the Authority may:

1. Set rules, instructions and guidelines for the aforesaid domain names administration.
2. Approve the accredited registrars and publish a list of their names in the Authority's website or by any other means.
3. Monitor the accredited registrars and registrants to check their compliance with the rules, instructions and guidance related to the respective domain names.
4. Publish the decisions of terminating the accreditation of the accredited registrars in the Authority's website or by any other means.
5. Take action concerning appeals and complaints that are submitted by accredited registrars or registrants or any concern party in any matter related to implementing the provisions of this Regulation, but without prejudice to the provisions of the Industrial Property Act and its executive regulation.

== .om Zones ==
The top-level .om consists of the following domain zones:

Zone	Registration Categories
.om	For the administrative sections of the government and the authorized firms in Oman, and from 2014 onwards, available to Omani companies and individuals.
.co.om	For registered companies and businesses in Oman
.com.om	For registered companies and businesses in Oman
.org.om	For general public firms (non-profit) permitted by Oman
.net.om	For firms that provide telecommunication services in Oman
.edu.om	For public or private educational institutes
.gov.om	For government agencies in Oman
.museum.om	For government or private entities that own or operate Omani museums
.pro.om	For trade unions and professional associations licensed by Oman, such as licensed doctors' and engineers' or any member of them.
.med.om	For government or private medical firms

== Accredited registrars ==
The accredited registrar is any person or entity authorized by the Authority under an agreement (Registrar Accreditation) to receive registration applications of Internet domains, make a decision, register, transfer, stop, delete them and taking any steps necessary related to the domain names within the defined lines in the Registrar Accreditation Agreement.

The Authority will review the applications submitted to it from the firms and establishments wanting to receive accreditation from the Authority and make decisions.

The current Accredited Registrars as of September 2022 are:

- GulfCyberTech
- Ooredoo Oman
- Oman Telecommunication Company
- Oman Digital Data Corporation (Oman Data Park)
- Abu-Ghazaleh Intellectual Property

== Typosquatting ==
.om domains were used in a typosquatting attack in 2016 to target Netflix users mistakenly visiting netflix.om instead of netflix.com, along with other websites.
