= Trade unions in Oman =

There are few trade unions in Oman, established following a 2006 decree by the Sultan of Oman permitting their establishment. Some of these have conducted elections, and are members of the General Federation of Oman Trade Unions (GFOTU). Oman has become the third Gulf Arab state, after Bahrain and Kuwait, to have a general federation of trade unions.

The International Trade Union Confederation's (ITUC) Annual Survey on Trade Union Rights Violations for 2009 reported serious problems for large parts of the country's workforce, especially migrant workers in construction and in domestic work. Oman joined the International Labour Organization in 1991 but has not ratified half the ILO's core labour standards conventions including No. 87, Freedom of Association and Protection of the Right to Organise Convention, 1948 or No. 98 Right to Organise and Collective Bargaining Convention, 1949.

For many years, trade unions were illegal in Oman. Until 2006, the World Federation of Trade Unions recognized one exile organization, the National Committee of Omani Workers.
