= Public Authority for Special Economic Zones and Free Zones =

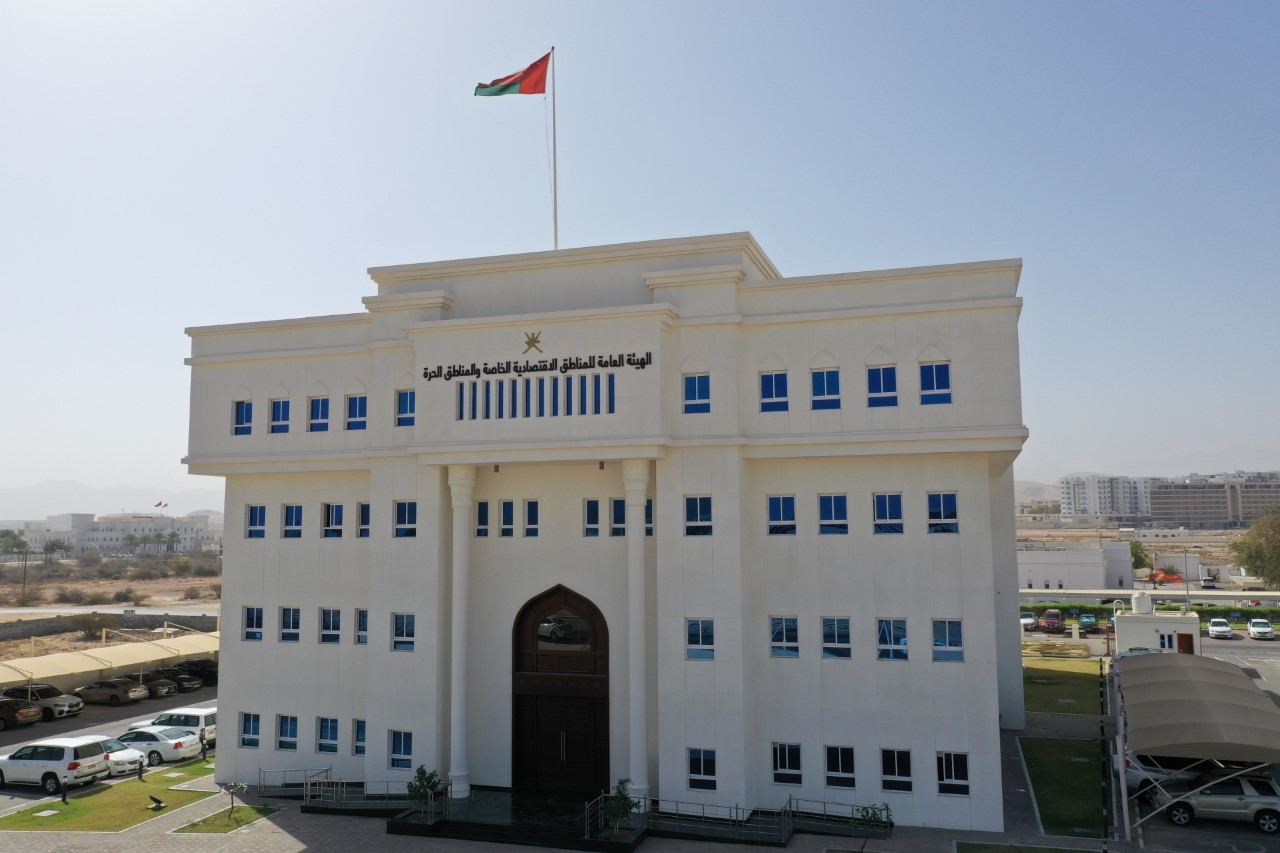
HQ of OPAZ in Muscat

The Public Authority for Special Economic Zones and Free Zones (OPAZ) is a governmental body in the Sultanate of Oman. The Royal Decree No 105/2020 established OPAZ in August 2020. It oversees the Special Economic Zone at Duqm, the Al Mazunah Free Zone, the Salalah Free Zone, and the Sohar Free Zone.

The headquarter of OPAZ is located in Muscat.
