= International rankings of Oman =

Oman international ranking

These are the international rankings of Oman

== International Rankings ==
| Organization | Survey | Ranking |
|---|---|---|
| Institute for Economics and Peace | Global Peace Index | 21 out of 144 |
| United Nations Development Programme | Human Development Index | 56 out of 182 |
| Transparency International | Corruption Perceptions Index | 39 out of 180 |
| World Economic Forum | Global Competitiveness Report | 41 out of 133 |
| World Intellectual Property Organization | Global Innovation Index, 2026 | 69 out of 139 |
