= Azamn =

Arabic newspaper in Oman

Azamn was an independent Arabic newspaper in the Sultanate of Oman on the Arabian Peninsula. It was suspended by the Omani government on August 9, 2016 following a report about senior Omani officials pressuring the country's judiciary to overturn a decision in an inheritance case. On September 26, a court ordered its permanent closure.

== Closure by government ==
The closure came after three journalists from the newspaper were arrested in the days following the publication of an article entitled "Supreme Bodies Tie the Hands of Justice." That article accused Ishaq Bin Ahmed Al Bousaidi, the chairman of the country's Judicial Council and chief magistrate of Oman's Supreme Court of intervening in inheritance cases before the courts at the behest of senior government officials.

On July 28, 2016, Azamn's editor-in-chief, Ibrahim al–Maamari, was called in for questioning by security officials and imprisoned. Oman's Information Ministry then warned the newspaper that if it continued to report on the issue it would be closed, according to Amnesty International. In protest of the order, Azamn left a portion of its front page blank for several days. Al-Maamari was previously arrested by the government in 2011 during the Arab Spring and sentenced to five months in prison. Publication of Azamn was also suspended for one month for publishing an article that was considered an insult to the officials at the Ministry of Justice.

On August 3, Zaher al-Abri, another editor at the newspaper, was taken into custody in the capital Muscat. Al-Abri's detention came one day after he had spoken to a representative of the New York-based press freedom group Committee to Protect Journalists for an article about al-Maamari's arrest.

Al-Abri's arrest did not end the conflict between the newspaper and the government. On August 9, Azamn published an interview with Ali bin Salem al-No’mani, the vice president of Oman's Supreme Court, in which he was quoted praising the newspaper's reporting on the lack of independence in Oman's judiciary and praising al-Maamari. "He [al-Maamari] spoke honestly and sincerely in his publication, and now as an administrator in the judiciary I do not know his whereabouts," al-No’mani was quoted as saying, according to Human Rights Watch.

Within hours of the report's publication, the newspaper was ordered closed and a news reported quoted an unnamed employee saying the publication was not given a clear reason for the closure or a time frame for when it might resume publication. That day, Omani security forces also arrested Yousif al-Haj, a deputy editor of the newspaper who had conducted the interviews with al-No'mani.

The newspaper's homepage also stopped operating and was replaced with an image of the three detained Azamn journalists.

The state-run Oman News Agency later published a statement criticizing a "local newspaper" without naming Azamn. "The report did not only ignore the basics of freedom of expression, but it also degraded it by utilising it in such a manner that harms one of the pillars of the state — the justice institution," it said. "The institution should be respected rather than be targeted with deliberate accusations meant to shake confidence, as was intended by the said newspaper in its recent series of articles and interviews."

=== Criticism of arrests ===
The closure and arrest of the three journalists has drawn criticism from rights groups including Human Rights Watch, the Committee to Protect Journalists and Amnesty International. "Hauling journalists off to prison for alleging authorities’ potential abuse of power completely undermines Oman's claims to respect free expression,” said Joe Stork, deputy Middle East director at Human Rights Watch, in a statement.

On August 23, the media freedom groups Reporters Without Borders and the Committee to Protect Journalists wrote an open letter to Oman's Sultan Qaboos Bin Said asking him to intercede on the behalf of the three jailed journalists and grant them "unconditional release" and lift the publishing suspension on Azamn. "Detaining and prosecuting journalists because of their investigative coverage of a judicial case amounts to criminalizing the very essence of journalism, which is to provide the public with information," the letter said.

=== Legal proceedings ===
Al-Maamari, Al-Haj and Al-Abri were charged with undermining the prestige of the state, disturbing public order and violating a ban on publishing in a court hearing August 15. On August 22, al-Abri was freed from custody on bail. The trial court also ordered news media and non-government organizations not to report on the trial of the three editors.

On September 26, 2016 the court sentenced editor-in-chief al-Maamari and deputy editor al-Haj to three years in prison and fined them the equivalent of $7,800 for charges that included "disturbing public order," "misusing the internet," and "undermining the state's prestige," according to a statement from the Monitor of Human Rights in Oman translated by Human Rights Watch. The two were also banned from journalism for a year, and bail was set at the equivalent of $130,000 should the two decide to appeal the conviction.

Al-Abri, the third editor, was also convicted on the same day and sentenced to one year in prison and fined the equivalent of $2,600 for making use of "an information network for the dissemination of material that might be prejudicial to public order." The court also ordered Azamn permanently closed the same day.
