= Television in Oman =

Television in Oman. Around 48% of the households receive television on terrestrials, and 48% on satellite. There were six free-to-air channels headquartered in Oman at the end of 2011, four of these privately owned. Only 7% of households have access to Pay television.

A reform in 2004 ended the state’s monopoly on television broadcasting. The first independent TV station Majan TV launched in 2009. In 2011, Jai Hind TV was launched in Oman.
