= Salute to the Sultan =

National anthem of Oman

Taḥīyah al-Sulṭān
English: 'Salute to the Sultan'
- تحية السلطان
- National anthem of Oman
- Lyrics: Rashid bin Uzayyiz al-Khusaidi, 1970; Haitham bin Tariq as-Said (second stanza remake), 2020
- Music: James Frederick Mills, 1932
- Adopted: 23 July 1970; 55 years ago

Audio sample
- U.S. Navy Band instrumental rendition in B-flat major: file; help

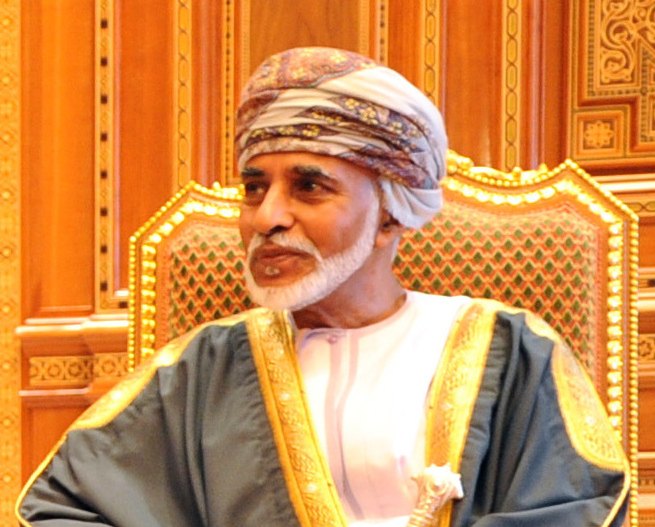
Qaboos bin Said (1940–2020), the Sultan of Oman, whom the song was originally dedicated to

"Salute to the Sultan" (Arabic: تحية السلطان) also known as "Peace to the Sultan" (Arabic: السلام السلطاني, romanized: as-Salām as-Sulṭānī) is the national anthem of the Sultanate of Oman. It is an ode originally dedicated to Qaboos bin Said, who was Sultan of Oman from 1970 to 2020.

== History ==
The anthem's lyrics were written by poet Rashid bin Uzayyiz al-Khusaibi. The music for it was composed at the request of the government of Muscat and Oman by James Frederick Mills, a Briton, in December 1932. The lyrics to this anthem contained an ode to then-Sultan Said bin Taimur.

In 1970, a modified version was introduced, written by the poet Hafiz bin-Salim as-Sayl al-Gasani, an adviser of Qaboos bin Said, who deposed his father in a palace coup that year. The melody was composed by Egyptian musician Mohammed Abdel Wahab.

On 20 February 2020, after Qaboos's death, Sultan Haitham bin Tariq issued a decree to remove his predecessor's name from the national anthem.

The 2020 revision was conducted by Director General of Military Music Brigadier Ramis Bin Juma Al Owira. The Performance was carried out by The Royal Guard of Oman Military Bands at General Directorate of Music Concert Hall with Recording Engineer Prince Anselm.

== Lyrics ==
=== Current lyrics ===
Arabic original

يَا رَبَّنَا اَحْفَظْ لَنَا جَلَالَةَ السُّلْطَان
وَالشَّعْبَ فِي الْأَوْطَان
بِالْعِزِّ وَ الْأَمَان
𝄇 وَلْيَدُمْ مُؤَيَدَا
عَاهِلًا مُّمَجَّدَا
بِالنُّفُوسِ يُفْتَدَىٰ 𝄆

يَا عُمَانْ نَحْنُ مِنْ عَهْدِ النَّبِي
أَوْفِيَاء مِنْ كِرَامِ الْعَرَبِي
فَارْتَقِي هَامَ السَّمَاء
وَامْلَئِي الْكَوْنَ ضِيَاء
وَاسْعَدِي وَانْعَمِي بِالرَّخَاء

Romanization

Yā rabbanā ʾaḥfaẓ lanā jalālat as-Sulṭān
Wa-sh-shaʿba fi-l-ʾawṭān
Bi-l-ʿizzi wa-l-ʾamān
𝄆 Wa-l-yadum muʾayadā,
ʿĀhilān mumajjadā;
Bi-n-nufūsi yuftadā. 𝄇

Yā ʿUmān, naḥnu min ʿahd in-Nabī
ʾAwfiyāʾ min kirāmi l-ʿArabī.
Fārtaqī hām as-samāʾ
Wa-imlaʾī l-kawna ḍiyāʾ
Wa-s-saʿdī wa-n-naʿmī bi-r-rakhāʾ.

IPA transcription (Note: See Help:IPA/Arabic and Omani Arabic.)

[jɑː rɑb.bæ.næː ʔæħ.fɑðˤ læ.næː d͡ʒæ.læː.læt æs.sʊl.tˤɑːn]
[wæ‿ʃ.ʃɑʕ.bæ fɪ‿l.ʔɑw.tˤɑːn]
[bɪ‿l.ʕɪz.zi wæ‿l.ʔæ.mæːn]
𝄆 [wæ‿l.jæ.dʊm mʊ.ʔæ.jæ.dæː]
[ʕɑː.hi.læːn mʊ.mæd.d͡ʒæ.dæː]
[bɪ‿n.nʊ.fuː.si jʊf.tæ.dæː] 𝄇

[jæː ʕʊ.mæːn | nɑħ.nʊ mɪn ʕɑhd ɪn.næ.biː]
[ʔɑw.fiː.jæʔ mɪn ki.rɑː.mɪ‿l.ʕɑ.rɑ.biː]
[fɑːr.tɑ.qɪː hæːm æs.sæ.mæːʔ]
[wɑ‿(ɪ)m.læʔ.ɪː‿l.kɑw.nɑ‿ðˤ.ðˤɪː.jæːʔ]
[wæ‿s.sɑʕ.diː wæ‿n.nɑʕ.miː bɪ‿r.rɑ.xɑːʔ]

English translation

O Almighty, save His Majesty the Sultan
and His people in their homelands
with pride and peace
𝄆 May He live long and triumphant
a glorified leader
for whom we shall lay down our lives 𝄇

O Oman, we have been from the time of the Prophet
of the most loyal and noble Arabs
So ascend to the apex of the heavens
Illuminate the cosmos
And rejoice and relish in prosperity.

=== Previous lyrics (Qaboos-era version) ===
Arabic original

يَا عُمَانْ نَحْنُ مِنْ عَهْدِ النَّبِي
أَوْفِيَاء مِنْ كِرَامِ الْعَرَبِي
أَبْشِرِي قَابُوسُ جَاء
فَلْتُبَارَكْهُ السَّمَاء
وَاسَّعْدِي وَلْتَقِيهْ بِالدُّعَاء

Romanization

Yā ʿUmān, naḥnu min ʿahd in-Nabī
ʾAwfiyāʾ min kirāmi l-ʿArabī.
Abshirī Qābūsū jāʾ
Faltubārakhu s-samāʾ
Wa-s-saʿdī wa-l-taqīh bi-d-duʿāʾ.

IPA transcription

[jæː ʕʊ.mæːn | nɑħ.nʊ mɪn ʕɑhd ɪn.næ.biː]
[ʔɑw.fiː.jæʔ mɪn ki.rɑː.mɪ‿l.ʕɑ.rɑ.biː]
[æb.ʃɪ.rɪː qɑː.buː.su d͡ʒæːʔ]
[fæl.tʊ.bæː.rɑk.hʊ‿s.sæ.mæːʔ]
[wæ‿s.sɑʕ.diː wæ‿l.tɑ.qɪːh bɪ‿d.dʊ.ʕæːʔ]

English translation

O Oman, since the time of the Prophet
We are a dedicated people amongst the noblest Arabs
Be happy! Qaboos has come
May heaven bless him
Be cheerful and commend him to the protection of our prayers.
