= Ooredoo Oman =

Omani telecommunications company

- Type: Private
- Industry: Telecommunications
- Founded: 2004 (as Nawras); 2014 (as Ooredoo)
- Headquarters: Muscat, Sultanate of Oman
- Key people: Saoud Al-Riyami, Chief Executive Officer "CEO"
- Number of employees: ▲ +1000
- Website: www.ooredoo.om

Ooredoo Oman (officially Omani Qatari Telecommunications Company SAOG) is an Omani telecommunications company headquartered in Muscat, Oman. Listed on the Muscat Stock Exchange (MSX: ORDS), it is the Sultanate's first privately owned telecommunications operator, providing mobile, fixed-line broadband, enterprise ICT, and cloud technology services across the country.

== History ==
=== Establishment and Market Entry (2004–2009) ===
The company was founded in December 2004 under the brand name Nawras as a joint venture between Qatar Telecom, TDC, and various Omani institutional investors.

Nawras launched commercial GSM mobile operations on March 16, 2005, ending the long-standing domestic monopoly held by state-owned operator Omantel. Within its first two years of operation, Nawras captured roughly 30% of Oman's mobile subscriber market share by introducing prepaid mobile offerings, competitive tariffs, and flat-rate roaming across Gulf Cooperation Council (GCC) nations.

=== Public Listing and Rebranding (2010–2014) ===
In November 2010, the company executed an initial public offering (IPO) on the Muscat Securities Market (now the Muscat Stock Exchange), floating 40% of its total capital share.

In 2014, as part of Ooredoo Group's global rebranding initiative, Nawras retired its original brand and adopted the Ooredoo name, becoming Ooredoo Oman. The rebranding was completed in October 2014, following the group's decision to unify its international operations under the Ooredoo brand.

=== Market Dynamics and Third Operator Entry (2021–Present) ===
In January 2022, Vodafone Oman launched as the country's third mobile network operator after receiving its Class I license in January 2021. Its entry ended the longstanding two-operator structure dominated by Omantel and Ooredoo and intensified competition in Oman's telecommunications market. In response to an increasingly digital and competitive market, Ooredoo Oman continued expanding its 5G network and investing in digital services, enterprise solutions, data centers, and fiber broadband.

== Services ==
Ooredoo Oman operates fixed-line, wireless, and data infrastructure across the Sultanate:

- 3G and 4G LTE: Ooredoo was the first operator to deploy 3G+ networks commercially in Oman. The company subsequently rolled out 4G LTE services in 2013 and expanded coverage using refarmed LTE frequencies for home broadband.
- 5G Network: Following spectrum allocation by the Telecommunications Regulatory Authority (TRA), Ooredoo Oman commercially launched its 5G network in May 2020 to support mobile and home wireless broadband.
- Fiber-Optic Infrastructure: The company launched nationwide investments in high-speed fiber-optic infrastructure to support residential home broadband and business enterprises.

== Corporate Governance and Ownership ==
Ooredoo Oman is majority-owned by Ooredoo Q.P.S.C., the Qatar-based telecommunications group. Ooredoo Q.P.S.C. holds a 55% stake in Ooredoo Oman, while the remaining 45% is held by other shareholders, with Ooredoo Oman’s shares publicly listed on the Muscat Stock Exchange under the ticker ORED.

- Ooredoo Q.P.S.C. (Qatar): 55%
- Other shareholders / publicly held shares: 45%
