= Azza (name) =

Azza is a surname and feminine given name of Arabic origin. Notable people with the name include:

== Given name ==
- Princess Azza of Iraq (1905–1960), Iraqi royal
- Azza Attoura (born 1974), Syrian kick boxer
- Azza Besbes (born 1990), Tunisian sabre fencer
- Azza Fahmy, Egyptian jewellery designer
- Azza Filali (born 1952), Tunisian doctor and writer
- Azza Ghanmi, Tunisian feminist
- Azza El-Hassan (born 1971), Palestinian documentary filmmaker, cinematographer, producer and writer
- Azza Al Ismaili, Omani politician and entrepreneur
- Azza Karam (born 1968), Egyptian professor and author
- Azza al-Mayla (died 705), Arab poet and musician
- Azza Sultan Al-Qasimi (born 1973), Emirati artist and businesswoman
- Azza Al-Qasmi (born 1985), Bahraini sport shooter
- Azza El Siddique (born 1984), Sudanese-Canadian artist
- Azza Soliman (born 1966), Egyptian lawyer and women's rights activist

== Surname ==
- Mariyam Azza (born 1989), Maldivian film actress
- Yelyzaveta Azza (born 2005), Ukrainian rhythmic gymnast

== See also ==
- Azza (disambiguation)
