= Aisha bint Khalfan bin Jameel =

Omani politician

Chair of the Public Authority for Craft Industries
- In office 2003–2020

Personal details
- Born: 1972 or 1973 (age 53–54) Samail, Oman
- Education: Sultan Qaboos University
- Occupation: Teacher

Sheikha Aisha bint Khalfan bin Jameel al-Sayabiyah (born 1972 or 1973 in Samail) was appointed the President of Public Authority for Craft Industries, Oman in 2003.

== Early life ==
Khalfan was born in Samail town, the youngest of 11 children. She attended the Sultan Qaboos University, from where she graduated with a degree in arts in 1995.

== Career ==
After finishing her education, Khalfan worked as a teacher. In March 2003, the Sultan of Oman Qaboos bin Said al Said issued a decree appointing Khalfan as the president of the Omani Public Authority for Craft Industries. This post is equivalent to the rank of minister without portfolio and hence she is regarded as the first woman minister of Oman. With this decree, Oman became the first country from the Gulf Cooperation Council to have a woman minister.

Khalfan is a member of the executive council of Arab Women Organisation (AWO) and headed the Omani delegation at the 2016 AWO Conference where Oman was chosen the president of AWO until 2019. She has also served on the University of Nizwa's Board of Trustees and is a cabinet member of Omani Women's Association.

The PACI was abolished by royal decree in 2020.
