= Rahma bint Ibrahim Al Mahrouqi =

Omani politician

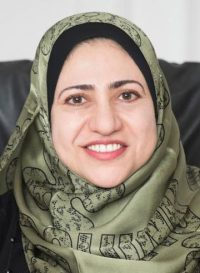

Minister of Higher Education, Research and Innovation
- In office 18 August 2020 – 12 January 2026
- Monarch: Haitham bin Tariq
- Prime Minister: Haitham bin Tariq
- Preceded by: Rawya Saud Al Busaidi

Personal details
- Education: University of Pittsburgh (PhD)

Rahma bint Ibrahim Al Mahrouqi was the Omani Minister of Higher Education, Scientific Research and Innovation. She was appointed as minister on 18 August 2020.

== Education ==
Al Mahrouqi holds a Bachelor and Master in Education from the Sultan Qaboos University and received her PhD in English and Communications Education from the University of Pittsburgh in 2003.

== Career ==
Al Mahrouqi was Director of the Language Center at Sultan Qaboos University from 2006 until 2010.

In 2010, Al Mahrouqi became assistant professor and in 2013 associate professor at the university. Additionally, she was Director at the univeristy's Humanities Research Center from 2014 until 2016. In 2016, she was appointed Deputy Vice-Chancellor of Postgraduate Studies and Research.

On 18 August 2020, Al Mahrouqi was appointed Minister of Higher Education, Scientific Research and Innovation. She remained in this post until the Ministry of Higher Education, Scientific Research and Innovation was merged with the Ministry of Education on 12 January 2026.

== Honors ==
=== National honors ===
- Oman:
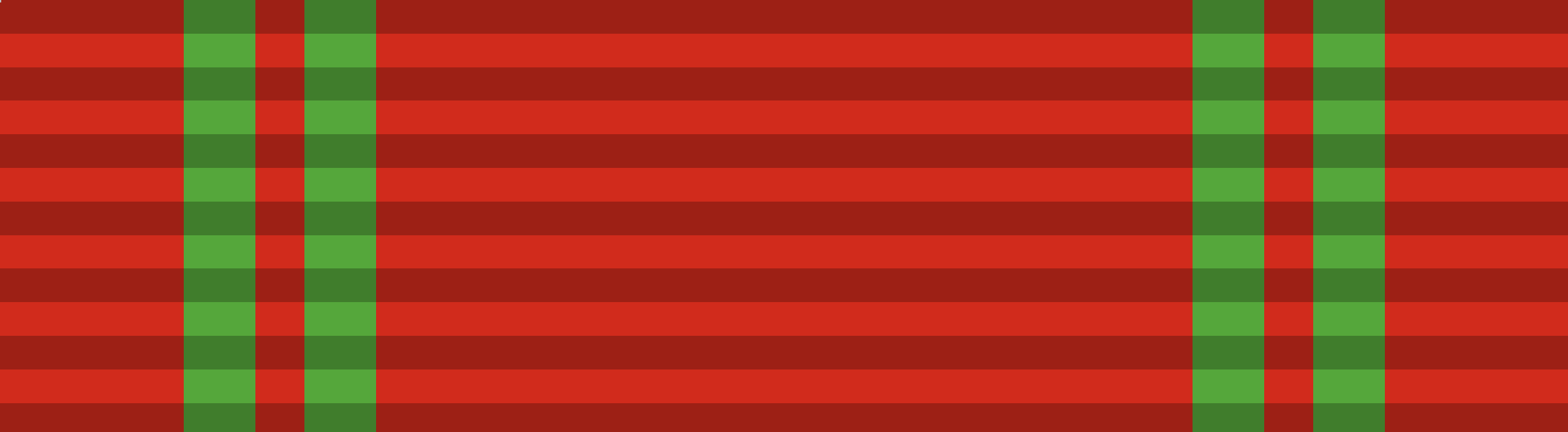
  - Second Class of the Civil Order of Oman (18 November 2024).
