= Rumaitha Al Busaidi =

Omani climate change activist

- رميثة البوسعيدي
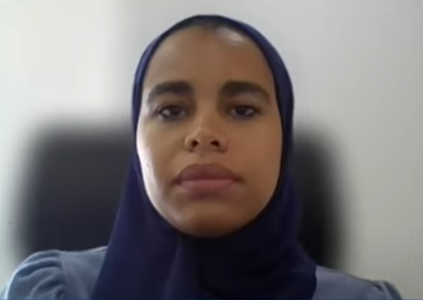
- Speaking at the World Economic Forum's Sustainable Development Impact Summit 2021
- Born: Oman
- Education: Utrecht University; University of Delaware; Sultan Qaboos University; Harvard Kennedy School
- Occupations: Climate change activist; women's rights activist; radio presenter; marine scientist; entrepreneur; footballer
- Known for: First female football analyst in the Arab world
- Website: www.rumaithabusaidi.com

Rumaitha Al Busaidi (Arabic: رميثة البوسعيدي) is an Omani climate change activist, women's rights activist, radio presenter, marine scientist, entrepreneur and footballer. She is regarded as the first female football analyst in the Arab world and also became the youngest Omani woman to cross the South Pole. She is also widely popularly regarded as one of the prominent radio personalities in Oman.

== Career ==
Rumaitha obtained her diploma from the University of Delaware 2005. She obtained a master's degree from the Sultan Qaboos University in 2014. She also received higher education at the Utrecht University. She received a Master of Public Administration degree from the Harvard Kennedy School. Rumaitha holds MSc degrees in the fields of Environmental Science and Aquaculture. She was also named as Millennium Fellow for 2019 by the Atlantic Council.

She served as vice chairperson of food manufacturing for the Omani National Program for Enhancing Economic Diversification. She had also served as an adviser to the Government of Oman. She also serves as director of Projects and Environmental Affairs and Fisheries Development in Oman.

Rumaitha founded WomeX, a platform to teach negotiation skills for Arab women to groom emerging female entrepreneurs in the Arab region. She also advocates for women's rights as well as environmental youth leadership. Rumaitha has also worked as a radio presenter for several years in Oman and she is known as Oman's first local English presenter in an Omani private radio station. She also played football, representing Oman national women's team, briefly before the team was sanctioned by FIFA in 2007.

She was part of the World Economic Forum's Global Shapers Community from 2013 to 2020. In 2017, she was named as One Young World Peace Ambassador by the European Commission. In addition, she was appointed as Challenge 22 ambassador for 2022 FIFA World Cup. She was also named as ambassador for the Institute for Economics and Peace (IEP).

Rumaitha has raised her voice and concerns about global climate change in the Davos Agenda of the World Economic Forum. She was one of the activists who took part in digital TED Countdown in April 2021 as part of Earth Day Live event.

== Awards ==
In November 2023, Rumaitha Al Busaidi was named to the BBC's 100 Women list.
