= Jamshed Akhtar =

Indian writer and researcher

- Born: May 4, 1947 (age 79); Faizabad, India
- Education: Aligarh Muslim University
- Occupations: Author, researcher
- Notable work: The Ultimate Revelations, In Search of Our Origins, Origin and Fate of Universe

Jamshed Akhtar (born 1947, Faizabad, India) is an Indian writer and researcher. He graduated from Aligarh Muslim University, India, in 1969, with a degree in Electrical Engineering. He is involved in the scientific study of religion and has written two books on this topic.

== Books ==
His first book The Ultimate Revelations, published in 1996, is probably the only Science fiction in the world with Quran as the central topic. The book outlines his research related to the possibility of coded information in Quran. It was well covered by almost all the major newspapers of India and UAE (Times of India - Feb 23rd, 1997, The Sunday Observer - May 18–24, 1997, The Hindu - July 7, 1997, Islamic Voice - Feb 23rd, 1997, Khaleej Times - May 2, 1998, Gulf News - May 1, 1998). In UAE, the book was presented at 'The Book Mall' by Shaikha Azza, daughter of HH Dr. Sheikh Sultan bin Muhammad Al-Qasimi, the ruler of Sharjah (Gulf News).

In 2010 his second book, a non-fiction work titled In Search of Our Origins, was published. This book presents his research on the origins of life and man in the light of revelations from Quran.

== Talk on Noah ==
In 1998, Akhtar presented a talk on the time, place and source of Noah's Flood, and a possible location of Noah's Ark, combining pointers from Quran with scientific findings. This paper was presented in a workshop jointly organized by Muslim Association for Advancement of Science (MAAS) and Centre for Studies on Sciences (CSOS) at Khandala.

== Institute of Revealed Knowledge ==
Akhtar has established an online Institute of Revealed Knowledge to collaborate with other researchers of different faiths and to initiate collective investigation of the information in revelations through a panel of linguists, science historians and scientists of various disciplines.

== Literacy Drive ==
Apart from the study on Quran, he is also involved in promoting literacy among rural children of Faizabad, India. He is the Founder Trustee of 'Foundation for Social Care', and President of Faiz-e-Aam Muslim Educational Society. Faiz-e-Aam in association with AFMI was responsible for Faizabad Literacy Project, which has been hailed as a model educational scheme.

== Project IMDAAD ==
In 2002, in collaboration with Institute of Objective Studies (IOS), Jamshed Akhtar designed and initiated Project IMDAAD to connect Muslim primary schools and mosques all over India with the Internet. Its objective was to disseminate information on education, health, business and awareness, and to collect feedback from the masses.

== Bibliography ==
- The Ultimate Revelations (1996)
- Project IMDAAD (2002)
- Faizabad Literacy Project (2004) - Documentary by Jamshed Akhtar
- In Search of Our Origins (2010), revised and updated (April 2012)
