= Ministry of Higher Education (Oman) =

Sultanate of Oman Ministry of Higher Education, Scientific Research and Innovation
- وزارة التعليم العالي والبحث العلمي والابتكار
- National emblem of Oman

Agency overview
- Jurisdiction: Government of Oman

The Ministry of Higher Education, Scientific Research and Innovation (MoHESRI) was the governmental body in the Sultanate of Oman responsible for supervising higher education institutes and the development of higher education policies in the Sultanate from 1994 until its merger with the Ministry of Education in 2026.

The former Minister of Higher Education was Rawya Saud Al Busaidi, who was succeeded by Rahma bint Ibrahim Al Mahrouqi.

== History ==
Prior to the establishment of the ministry, the Directorate General of Scholarship and Foreign Relations carried out a similar role. Upon the ministry's establishment in 1994, the directorate was transferred from the Ministry of Education to it. Additional responsibilities were also assigned to the ministry involving the supervision of higher education institutes and the development of higher education policies.

The competences of the Ministry of Higher Education were revised twice after its establishment. The initial competences were issued in 1994 and included supervision of the Sultan Qaboos University. These competences were revised again in the year 2000 removing all references to the university, and then they were refined again in the year 2002. In 2010, the Ministry launched an online portal to provide information on and easy access to its services.

On 12 January 2026, the ministry was merged with the Ministry of Education by royal decree.

== Function ==
The competences of MOHE were as follows:

1. Implementing the adopted policies in the fields of higher education and scientific research.
2. Proposing the general policy for higher education and scientific research.
3. Preparing future generations academically in all fields of knowledge.
4. Supervising higher education institutes assigned to the ministry.
5. Proposing the mechanism for admitting students into higher educational institutes supervised by the ministry.
6. Encouraging and supervising scientific research centers assigned to the ministry.
7. Implementing the scholarship law and providing the opportunities for qualified individuals to continue their higher education in the fields needed by the country.
8. Evaluating academic qualifications and degrees granted by universities, colleges, and higher educational and scientific institutes.
9. Surveying and registering academic degrees acquired by Omanis after the first university degree.
10. Undertaking the procedures for the international recognition of degrees granted by Omani higher education institutes.
11. Following up the coordination and integration between higher education institutes and research centers.
12. Preparing draft laws related to higher education and scientific research and issuing the regulations for implementing them.
13. Licensing the establishment of higher education institutes in Oman.
14. Following the decisions to admit students and other academic requirements at higher educational institutes.
15. Participating in strengthening foreign scientific and cultural ties in the field of higher education and scientific research.
16. Representing the Sultanate in international and regional organizations and conferences in this field.
17. Training Omani staff at the ministry.

== Former Senior Officers ==
- Yahya bin Mahfooth Al Manthari - appointed as the first Minister of Higher Education in 1994.
- Salim bin Mistihail bin Ahmed Al Ma'shani - appointed as Undersecretary for the Ministry of Higher Education for Scholarships and Foreign Relations Affairs in 1994, then reinstated in the same year as the Undersecretary for the Ministry of Higher Education for all matters and not only scholarships and foreign relations.
- Rawya Saud Al Busaidi - Her appointment as the Minister of Higher Education in 2004 was the first appointment in Oman for a woman as the head of any ministry. She remained in the position until 2020.
