= Al Thowarah hot spring =

Thermal spring

Coordinates: 23.3754°N 57.8284°E

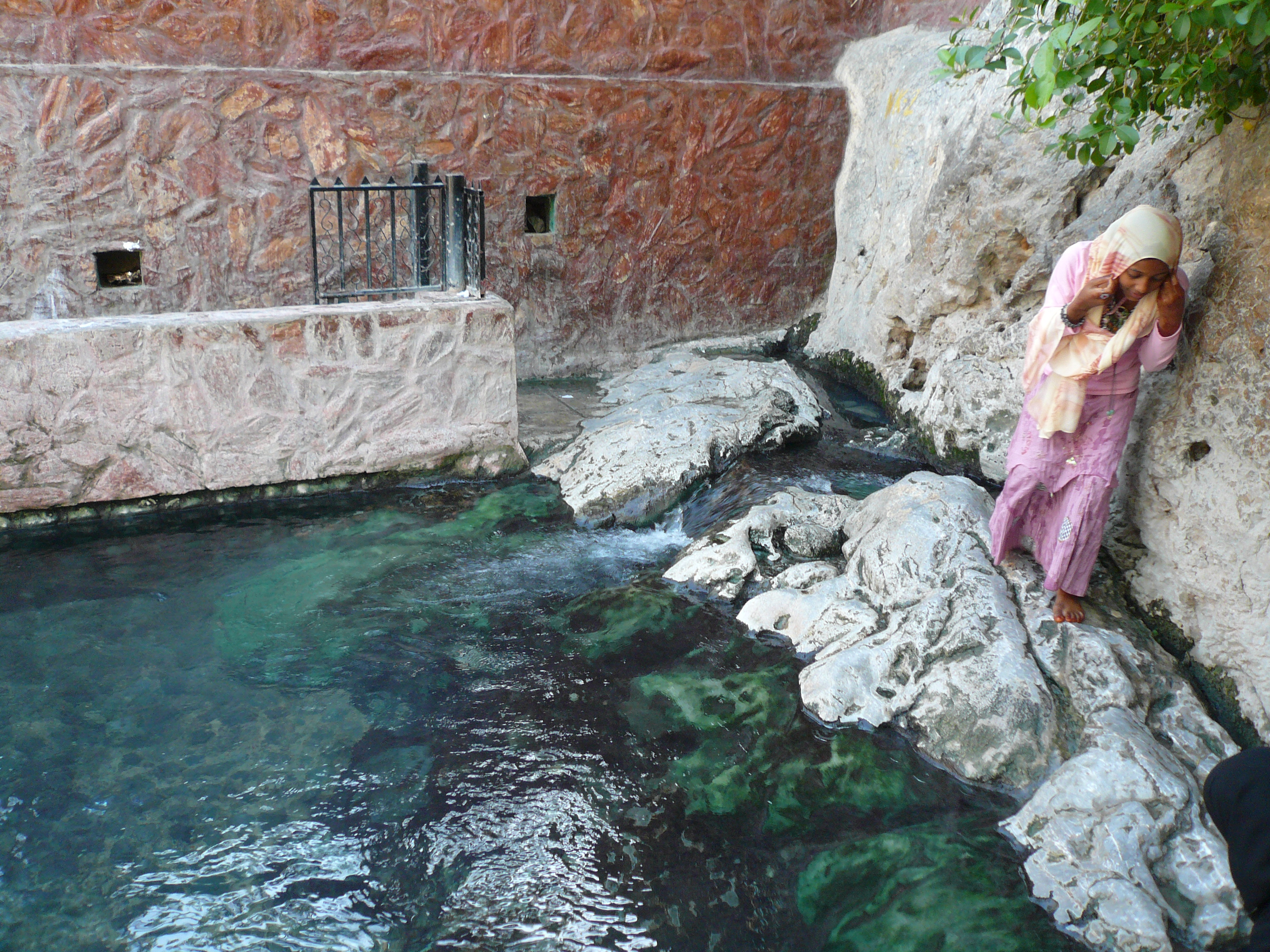
A woman at the Thowarah hot springs

The al Thowarah hot spring, also called the Nakhal spring, is located a few kilometres from the Nakhal Fort in Oman, located off the road that connects Barka with Rustaq. It is a green area where a spring forms a stream in a wadi (valley).

It is one of the sites featured in a series of Oman landscape paintings by British artist Alan Reed.

== See also ==
- List of hot springs
