= Oman Daily Observer =

English-language daily newspaper published in Muscat, Oman

- Front page, 13 January 2007
- Type: Daily newspaper
- Format: Broadsheet
- Owner(s): Oman Establishment for Press, News Publication and Advertising (OEPPA), Ministry of Information
- Editor: Abdullah Salim Al Shueili
- Founded: 1 November 1981; 43 years ago
- Political alignment: Pro-government
- Language: English
- Headquarters: Madinat Al Ilam, Muscat, Sultanate of Oman
- Website: omanobserver.om

Oman Daily Observer is an English-language daily broadsheet published from Muscat, the capital of the Sultanate of Oman, and it comes under the Ministry of Information. Dr Abdullah Nasser bin Khalifa al-Harrasi is the current Minister of Information.

== History and profile ==
The Oman Daily Observer was established on 15 November 1981. It is the only English-language newspaper to be published on all seven days in Oman, as its two competitors have no editions during weekends.

The 'Observer' focuses on local, national, regional, and international news, covering current affairs, business, and sports. It also pays special attention to Oman's economic development, highlighting the country's natural, historical, and cultural wealth.

Abdullah bin Salim al Shueili, the current Editor-in-Chief of the Observer, has been in the post since 2013.
