= The Ultimate Revelations =

1996 novel by Jamshed Akhtar

- Author: Jamshed Akhtar
- Language: English
- Subject: Religion, Qur'an, science fiction
- Genre: Science, philosophy
- Publisher: Oriole Books
- Publication date: 1996
- Publication place: India
- ISBN: 81-900691-0-1
- Followed by: In Search of Our Origins: How Qur'an Can Help in Scientific Research (2010)

The Ultimate Revelations (1996) is an Islamic science fiction novel by Jamshed Akhtar.

== Overview ==
Published in 1996, the book outlines a two-part hypothesis about revelations. First, it presents a universal design linking all revelations on Earth, and explains the continuity of this phenomenon via the arrival of a last and final transmission on Earth with future guidance hidden in it, in layers. Humanity is expected to decode the guidance, layer by layer, in different time frames till its end. The second part of the book then analyses the claim of the Qur'an as being that final Message.

To support this hypothesis, the author presents several arguments from the historical records describing the advent of Qur'anic revelations (Wahy), its language of communication, its time of arrival, the characteristics of its recipient nation, the information in its contents, and the presence of an interpreting mechanism built into the Qur'an. The effect of the Message is presented, encompassing not only the initial seven centuries of development and progress under Muslim rule, but also the later period extending till today, when as per the author, the chaos gradually took hold of the Muslim realm and a different part of the planet developed, based on the infra-structure of information provided through the fall of Spain.

Final chapter of the book is devoted to an analysis of Rashad Khalifa's controversial mathematical structure in the text of Qur'an, pointing out the problems that had become the basis of its rejection in the Muslim world.

== Plot ==
The story is set sometime in the twenty-first century. An expanding shell of low energy from the Sun's core, moving towards its surface for the last million years, breaks through its outer envelope. The shell is thin, and the slight decrease in the solar output is not expected to last long. Still, the event has tremendous potential of menace. Even this tiny solar hiccup has the capability to push the planet again towards a cold grave, from which it had painfully emerged just twelve thousand years ago.

Concurrent with this freak solar activity, a young scientist begins having strange and puzzling dreams of momentous events from the past. He sees an event in the formation of solar event, a day in the Cretaceous period, Noah's Ark being constructed, Buddha's sermon to a large multitude, Moses climbing the mountain to keep tryst with the mysterious fire, child Mary's guardianship being decided in the temple, and an episode in Mohammed's life. The mystic night visions leave the young man perturbed and intrigued, but also prod him to study and collect data on meta-physical aspect of life.

Meanwhile, falling temperatures all over the world herald the onset of an ice age. The planet in its fight for survival, tries to distribute the heat stored in oceans all over the land. Tornadoes, squalls and high velocity winds sweep the planet and add to the misery of the humanity already suffering from the energy crunch. It is at this crucial juncture that the young man receives an inspiration, and presents before the world a hypothesis about a 'Grand Cosmic Design'...

Spread over six days of teleconference, the young scientist then lays before the world hundreds of arguments, from different disciplines of science, showing to humanity that this 'logically predicted Message of the Design' is not a thing of the future, but is already here, and in order to save the planet, humanity is only required to unravel the information coded within it...

But humanity dithers. And as the ice age tightens its talons around the planet, and organic life groans under the increased sufferings, the young man himself decides to work on the Message.

Once again he gets help and presents before the world, the ultimate argument, its anomaly and its solution...

== Reception ==
The book was published independently, and therefore was not widely distributed through commercial channels. Nonetheless, it received critical coverage in a number of media, and was promoted by Sheikha Azza Sultan Al-Qasimi, daughter of Sultan bin Muhammad Al-Qasimi.

Khaleej Times in an article entitled "Holy Quran in Scientific Light" dated May 2, 1998 cited a number of commentators on the book:

- Uthman Barry (died in 2010), a teacher who hosted the 'Discovering Islam' on Sharjah TV said that "This book has interest for religious persons certainly, scientists definitely and even for those interested in science fiction".
- Syed Khalil, executive director of Galadari Brothers pointed out that 'The Ultimate Revelations' is "the first attempt made to present the Quran in a scientific manner to the modern world". He also said that "its presentation with the aid of mathematical and scientific arguments would give the work credence among even the Western scientific community which was sceptical of all things religious".
- Dr. Bilal-Abdul Aleem of the Sharjah Auqaf department and co-host of Discovering Islam said that "Throughout my education, I was taught that science and religion do not go together," but "This book goes a long way in presenting spiritual philosophies to intelligent, scientific people."

The book has been called "gripping", "a clever amalgam of fact and fiction" and a "message from the stars". Tariq Abdullah, a religious scholar, called 'The Ultimate Revelations' "a unique religion-science fiction, with a purpose and therefore very different from other science fictions". The book has, however, been criticised for its author's misunderstanding of Arabic, and for its obsession with numerology.
