= Nelly Attar =

Saudi and Lebanese mountaineer (born 1990)

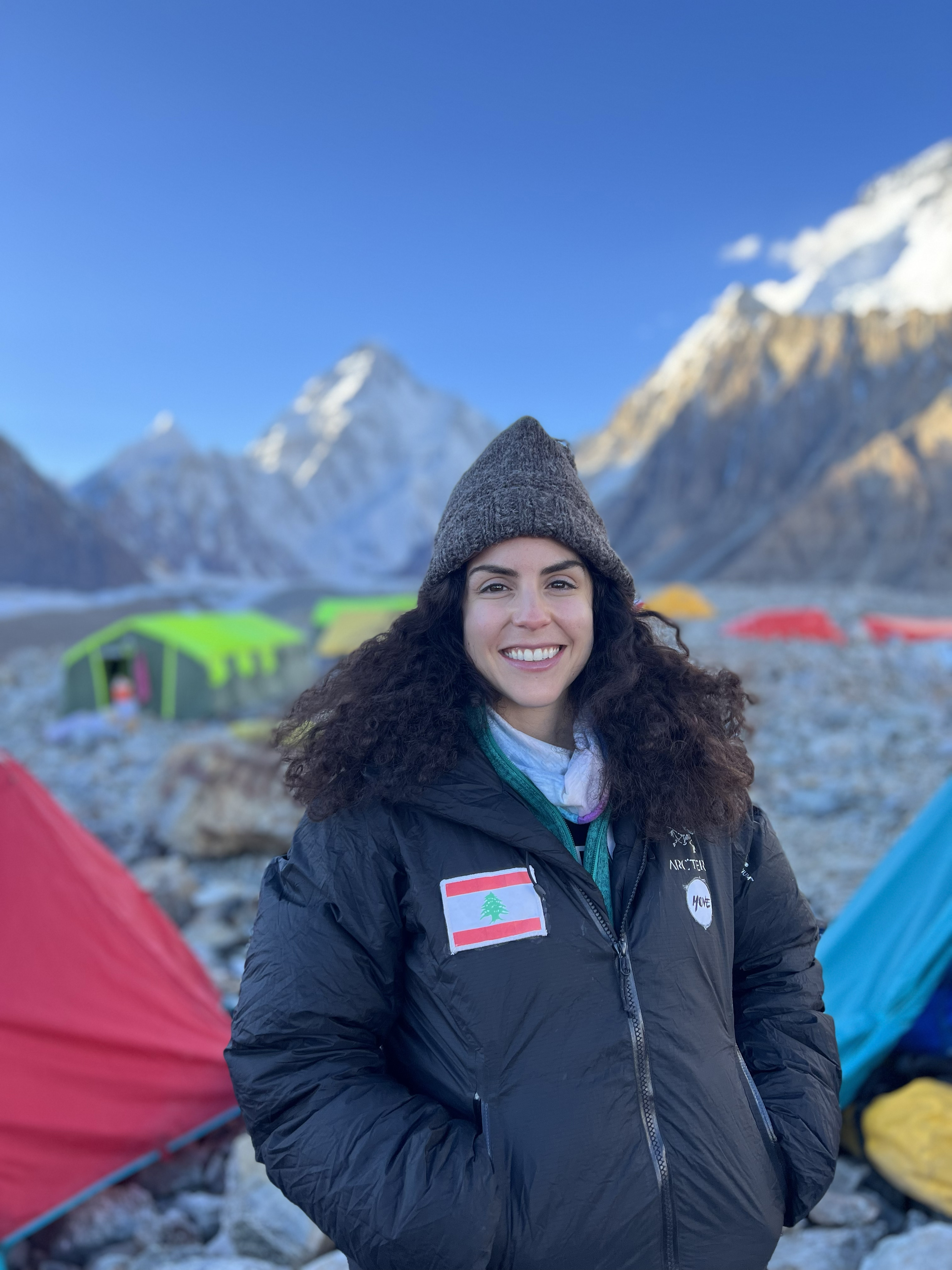

Personal information
- Citizenship: Lebanese and Saudi
- Born: 2 February 1990 (age 36) Riyadh, Saudi Arabia

Climbing career
- Major ascents: Mount Everest, K2, Lhotse, Makalu

Nelly Attar (Arabic: نيللي عطار; born 1990) is a Saudi and Lebanese mountaineer. In 2022, she became the first Arab woman to summit K2. Attar is a former psychologist. She has an MRes degree in psychology and worked four years as a therapist, prior to shifting into sports.

== Early life and education ==
Nelly Attar was born on 2 February 1990 in Riyadh, Saudi Arabia. She is from an ethnically mixed Lebanese-Saudi family, and was raised in Saudi Arabia.

She completed her academic studies in psychology and was awarded a B.Sc. degree from the American University of Beirut, and MRes degree from Kingston University in London. She started her career as a psychologist and life coach. Attar later shifted careers to follow her passion for fitness and physical activity.

== Climbing career ==
Attar started mountain climbing in 2007 when she climbed Mount Kenya. In 2015, she climbed Kilimanjaro, and in 2016, climbed Elbrus. In 2017, Attar scaled several major mountains including Aconcagua, Mont Blanc, Mount Stanley, and Mount Speke. The following year she re-climbed Kilimanjaro, and ascended Lenin Peak, Island Peak, and Lobuche.

In 2019, Attar along with three other Arab Women, Joyce Azzam, Mona Shahab, and Nadhira Al Harthy, climbed Everest. It was described as an "all-woman Arab team".

In 2021, Attar climbed Denali and Ama Dablam. In 2022, Attar climbed K2, completed the Breithorn Traverse, and ascended the Matterhorn.

Attar has claimed a number of firsts in her mountaineering career, becoming the first Arab woman to Summit the K2 in 2022, the first Arab woman to summit Mount Stanley and Mount Speke in 2017, and the first Lebanese Woman to climb Ama Dablam and the Matterhorn.

Attar became the first Lebanese to summit Lhotse in May 2024. On 10 May 2025, Attar became the first Arab woman to scale Kangchenjunga.

== Awards ==
Attar has received multiple awards throughout her career, including a Guinness World Record for the highest number of four-finger pull-ups in one minute. In 2023, Attar was honored with the Laureus Sporting Moment Award in recognition of her achievements. In 2023 as well, Attar was recognized by Fast Company as one of the Most Creative People in Business for "Rewriting the Rules."

== Other activities ==
Attar launched the MOVE studio in 2017, during the time Saudi Arabia started undergoing a wave of national transformation. MOVE is the first dance studio in Saudi Arabia.

Attar has scaled 23+ peaks globally since 2015. She has also completed 6 marathons, a dozen triathlons, and 1 ultramarathon, the Hajar trail race.

In 2023, Attar set the female record for the Most Four Finger Pull-ups (2 fingers per hand) in 1 minute.

== See also ==
- Eight-thousanders
