= Women in Oman =

General statistics
- Maternal mortality (per 100,000): 32 (2010)
- Women in parliament: 2.33% (2020)
- Women over 25 with secondary education: 47.2% (2010)
- Women in labour force: 61,5%(2022)

Gender Inequality Index
- Value: 0.300 (2021)
- Rank: 72nd out of 191

Global Gender Gap Index
- Value: 0.609 (2022)
- Rank: 139th out of 146

Women in Oman now pursue careers and professional training, moving from their previous and traditional role at home to the public sphere. In Oman, 17 October is celebrated every year as the Omani Women's Day with various pro-female events.

While article 17 of Oman's Basic law bans discrimination on the basis of gender, Omani law does not provide equality or protection to women in several areas. Domestic violence and marital rape are not criminalized in Oman. Polygamy is legal for men, and wives owe their husbands' obedience. Fathers are the sole guardians of children and husbands can divorce their wives by repudiation, whereas wives require specified grounds for divorce or forgoing of financial rights. Women do not have equal rights in inheritance or in passing Omani nationality to their children. Under article 80 of Omani Labour law men and women are required to be paid equally for the same work and article 84 prevents termination of employment on the basis of pregnancy. Abortion is prohibited by Articles 315–318 of the Penal Code, including for women who have been raped.

== Politics ==
In 1970, the political and social atmosphere of Oman changed with the advent of a new ruler, Sultan Qaboos bin Said, son of the conservative and rigid Said bin Taimur. After decades of stagnant to non-existent growth, Qaboos overthrew his father in a palace coup and immediately began numerous social programs, commissioning hospitals, clinics, schools, etc. Many Omanis who had been living abroad to get a proper education returned to participate in the construction of a new nation. The abroadees also brought with them the liberal and open attitude of their host countries, including the idea of equal gender relations.

Sultan Qaboos introduced many reforms funded mostly by the oil revenue, targeting development and social services. He also appointed the Majlis al-Shura (Consultative Council), a body of representatives elected by the people that review legislation. This act gave the people more control in their government which had been previously in complete control of the royal family and his appointed cabinet. In the September 2000 elections, 83 candidates were elected for seats in the Majlis al-Shura, including two women. In 1996, the Sultan issued "The Basic Law of the Sultanate of Oman" to serve as a form of written constitution. This document gives the Omani people their basic civil liberties as well as guaranteeing equality and protection under the law. In 2002, universal suffrage was granted to all Omanis over the age of 21.

More recently, the Sultan's Royal Decree in 2008 gave women the equal right to own land as held by their male counterparts. Sultan Qaboos also recently signed the Decent Work Country Programme, a service dedicated to increase job opportunities for women as well as stand for justice, equality, and freedom. The program is supposed to be implemented from 2010 to 2013.

== Education ==
Modern education was foreign to Omanis before 1940. Before the reforms made by Sultan Qaboos, there were only three primary schools serving 900 boys, focusing mainly on reciting the Quran and learning basic math and writing skills. In 1970, Sultan Qaboos introduced the universal education policy for both men and women, increasing female attendance in schools from 0% in 1970 to 49% in 2007. In the years following, 600,000 students, both male and female, enrolled in over 1000 schools, bringing Oman one step closer to the goal of "education for all".

After this first stage of universal education was established, the Ministry of Education implemented measures to improve the quality of education. In the 1980s, the Omani government sponsored construction of school buildings, the providing of adequate equipment and textbooks, and the provision of teacher training. The reforms continue today and saw a tremendous growth in school attendance. The gender equality was the next focus of the education reform, especially after Oman's 1995 "Vision 2020" that focused on the country's economic future. As a result, in 2003 to 2004, 48.4% of students were female and out of 32,345 teachers of both genders, 56% were female.

In the past the College of Engineering at Sultan Qaboos University banned the entrance of female students, claiming that the "outdoor setting" of engineering field work was not gender appropriate. Though students protested, many women had to transfer to other institutions; this has changed and even females are allowed to be in it.

== Labor and employment ==
After the 1970 Omani coup d'état, women educated overseas (education in Oman not being possible) were encouraged to return to Oman and help to "rebuild the nation." With a leader who embraced the ideals of modernization and progress, women were able to hold jobs in nearly every profession: banking, medicine, engineering and teaching. According to a UNICEF-sponsored census, 40% of economically active women were in professional job categories. In 2000, 17% of the Omani workforce was made up of women.

In the 1980s, however, the government started to retract their previous liberties and slowly restrict the professions deemed "gender acceptable" for women. The number of professional women decreased and women were forced into more traditional roles as "nurturers and caregivers." The Omani Women's Association, the first women's government-recognized group in Oman, was stripped of the majority of its independence and was passed to the male-led Ministry of Social Affairs and Labor. In 1984, it was replaced with a Directorate General of Women and Child Affairs with a sub-unit for women's associations. The main goal of this unit was to set up classes for women to learn basic household skills and day-care centers for the handicapped and disabled.

Despite the slight setbacks, Oman is still considered to be one of the leading Gulf countries in terms of gender equality and continue to make positive strides. In 1997, the Omanisation Policy was implemented, committing to the promise of gradually replacing foreign labor dependence with Omani workers, giving women more of a chance to participate in the work force and making jobs more accessible to all Omanis. Women now make up 30% of the workforce and even serve in ministerial positions. The ministers of higher education, tourism, and social development in the cabinet are all women, as well as the US ambassador and the head of national authority for industrial craftsmanship.

The most common role for the Omani woman is still the role of housewife. The housewife is essential to the upkeep of the family and will take command of all agricultural production while her husband is away for months at a time. These women work hard to support a family and tend to many matters traditionally seen by the man. Women are not allowed to cover their face (niqab) in professional institutes, number of Omani and expats women not able to show their participation in public field, even it is not allowed for women to cover their face while driving.

== Attire ==
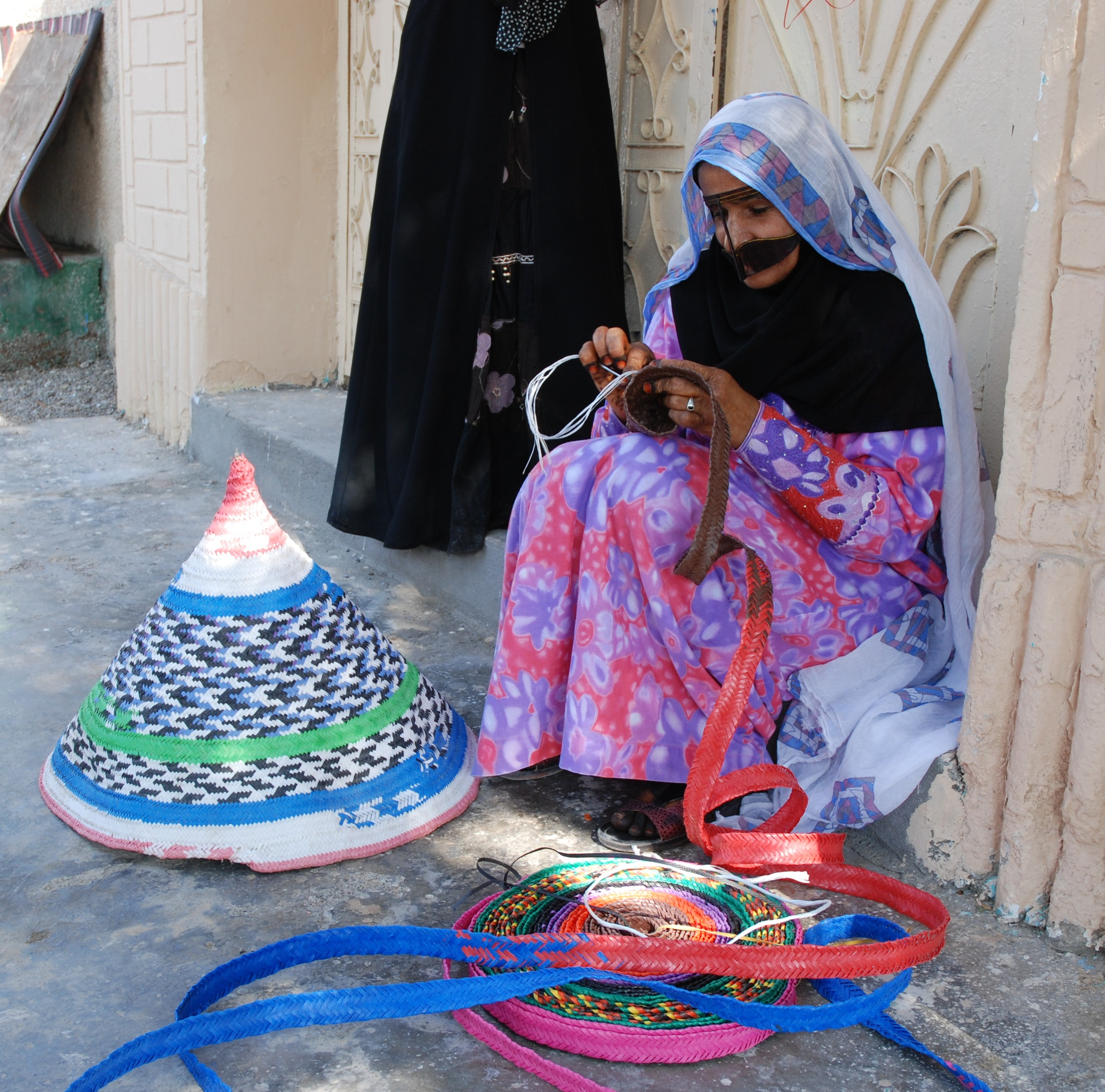
An elderly woman in Oman wearing the Battoulah

The rules of modesty in Islamic culture require a woman to be modestly covered at all times, especially when traveling farther from the home. At home, the Omani woman wears a long dress to her knees along with ankle-length pants and a leeso, or scarf, covering her hair and neck. Multitudes of lively colored Jalabiyyas are also worn at home. Once outside the home, dress is varied according to regional tastes. For some of a more conservative religious background, the burqa is expected to be worn to cover her face in the presence of other males, along with the wiqaya, or head scarf, and the abaya, an all-enveloping cloak revealing only her hands and feet. Many women from varying regions of the Sultanate wear the scarf to cover only their hair.

The cotton burqa is symbolic of the expectations of the ideal woman and act as a mark of respect to represent her modesty and honor as well as her status. The burqa, first worn by a young girl after her seven-day honeymoon, is on whenever she is in the presence of strangers or outside the home, covering most of her face from view. The highest and lowest classes of Omanis do not wear the burqa—the highest being the children and relatives of the Sultan and the lowest being the poorest women in the town. This makes the burqa a symbol of rank as well. Some burqa differ in regions and designs as well, varying in size, shape and color. The Quran, however, makes no references specific to the modern day burqa.

The abaya is the conservative dress of choice, favored by women of most social classes and regions. The multitudes of designs and decadent embellishments on the modern day abaya has allowed it to become a versatile clothing that can be made either plain or a fashion statement, in Oman and in other neighboring Islamic countries.

The new freedom for Omani women of the 1970s also included the freedom to unveil, and the first unveiled woman appeared in this time period. A woman employed at the Omani television in the 1970s later commented:

"at that time, the only concern of Omani men and women was how to build the nation...How can we help each other to elevate the social and economic conditions of people. Women, like men were fighting for a better future for Oman. We women for instance managed to establish the first Omani Women's Association in 1972... I used to travel throughout the country with the production team, reporting on the achievements of the renaissance such as the development of new schools, health clinics and hospitals, we were men and women, and there was no real concern for me as a woman travelling and presenting a programme without veiling or without being accompanied by a male relative".

== Family ==
Women have always been seen as a wife and mother first and foremost. Marriage and having children determine their social status and as soon as a woman is wed, most of her decisions are made by her husband.

Marriage is a defining moment in the life of an Omani woman and marks her transformation from girl to woman. Though Sultan Qaboos extended both males and females the legal right to choose their spouse in 1971, tradition holds that the girl's father is responsible for setting up a proper match and securing his daughter's happiness. According to Unni Wikan's 1982 book, Behind the Veil in Arabia, most girls at the time got married around the time they reached puberty, for the timely arrival of sexual desire was supposed to coincide with marriage. In this way, every unwed Omani girl was expected to be a virgin.

In combination with the improvements in other areas of female life, the importance of sexual health and health education of women has come to the forefront recently. Even in 2004, 15% of adolescent girls aged 15–20 were married, a much higher statistic than other countries and resulting in a very young and uneducated population of young mothers. In 1994, the government implemented a birth spacing program and encouraged the use of contraceptives among married couples by providing them for free in most health centers. The program was effective and the total fertility rate dropped from a staggering 7.05 in 1995 to 4.8 in 2000.

== See also ==
- Women in Islam
- Women in the Arab world
- Rawya Saud Al Busaidi
- Culture of Oman
- Women in Asia
- Women's rights
