= Badriyya al-Shihhi =

Omani novelist (born 1971)

Badriyya Al-Shihhi (born 1971) is an Omani novelist, the first woman from her country to publish a novel. In the judgment of the Egyptian poet and journalist Ashraf Dali, al-Shihhi's 1999 novel "realized the birth of the real Omani novel."

== Biography ==
Badriyya Al-Shihhi studied Chemical Engineering and graduated with a PhD from Sultan Qaboos University, in al-Seeb, Oman. She held several high positions, including: Vice President of the State Council, a high position in the university’s administration. She resides in Great Britain and works in the field of chemical engineering.

Badriyya Al-Shihhi published her first novel, “Al-Tawaf Hind Al-Jamar” in 1999. This novel is considered “the first Omani feminist novel” and has been described as “a cry of protest against the neglect of women in society.” Badriya Al Shehi is one of the writers who dealt with the issue of slavery as a thesis in her novel “Al-Tawaf Hind Al-Jamar,” like Rashid Abdullah in his novel “Shahanda,” Fawzia Al Salem in her novel “Al-Nawakhtha,” and Maysoun Saqr Al Qasimi in her novel “Rayhana,” according to Muhammad Saif Al Islam in his book “Semiotics of Omani Narrative Discourse: The Novel “Ladies of the Moon” by the Writer Jokha Al Harthi as a Model.”

In an article in Al-Athar magazine, Amouri Naeem believes that Al-Shihhi tried through the novel “Al-Tawaf Hind Al-Jamr” to fight some traditions that are inappropriate for women and caused a great uproar in the Sultanate of Oman, as it touched on women’s issues and the oppression they live under. Zahra was the heroine of the novel who suffered the most in her life and in her misery, even with her escape from her father’s house, she lived subject to the false laws that men imposed on her.

== Critics' opinions ==
Nazik Al-Araji criticized the language of the heroine of the novel “Al-Tawaf Hind Al-Jamar” because she used expressions that an illiterate girl was not supposed to know, from his point of view. He saw that this was due to “the writer’s culture and experience slipping into the character’s language... but this approach is justified by the fate of the woman who is the subject of the biography, who ultimately deserves to be proud of her personal characteristics as a criterion in determining her fate.”

Khalid Al-Maamari believes that Badriyya Al-Shihhi “has been working since her first novel, Al-Tawaf Hind Al-Jamar, to the novel Karma Al-Dhib to create a relationship between character and place, although the two are closely linked in narrative writing and interact with each other in the construction of events. Accordingly, she has given the characters of her novels the freedom to penetrate places, and the right to interact and enter her imaginary world, forming a focus of conflict and collision between them. The natures of the characters in Badriyya Al-Shihhi's novels - whether primary or secondary - grow based on spatial situations and their changes from one space to another.” According to him, Badriyya Al-Shihhi presented in her novels (Al-Tawaf Hind Al-Jamar, Physics 1, and Karma Al-Dhib) an image of the relationship between character and place, and he noted the presence of “the contradictions of place in culture, language, social and scientific life, and the ideology that has hidden in human thought.” As for the image of women in her writings, he believes that it “is formed according to an ideological conflict with the other, and accordingly this conflict expands "to include the place that works to shape events according to its vision of the reference that it addresses in the novel.”

== Works ==
- Al-Tawaf haythu al-jamr [Treading Around the Embers]. Beirut: Al-Mu'assasa al-'Arabiyya lil-Dira wa-l-Nashr, 1999.

== Sources ==
- Barbara Michalak-Pikulska, "Modern Poetry and Prose of Oman 1970-2000", Krakow: The Enigma Press 2002
