= Sultan Qaboos University Library =

- 23°35′28″N 58°10′10″E
- Location: Sultan Qaboos University, Oman

Other information
- Director: Dr. Khlfan ibn Zahran Alhajji
- Website: Official website

The Sultan Qaboos University Library is the legal deposit and copyright library for Oman. It is part of the campus of the Sultan Qaboos University.
