= Manga Arabs =

Ethnic group

The Manga or Wamanga Arabs are Omani Arabs, specifically from the region of Muscat, who have immigrated to parts of East Africa such as Zanzibar. They are different from the Omanis who already were there since the first immigration wave, not only because of the time they have spent there, but also because of their level of education and integration, their knowledge of Islam, their socio-economic status and the length of time they intended to stay (usually, one generation).

Due to their low level in all of these factors in comparison with their predecessors, the Manga Arabs usually only aspire to low-level economic positions unlike their predecessors who became aristocrats.Some Manga Arabs are small land cultivators, plantation supervisors, caravan managers or small traders.

== Etymology ==
The word is derived from the Arabic munqa'a (the sea). The Arabic root, naqa'a, also yields a verb meaning "to soak".

== See also ==
- Muscat and Oman
- Omani Empire
