= Azza (disambiguation) =

'Azza is a Palestinian refugee camp.

Azza may also refer to:

- Azza (name), list of people with the name
- Mohammad Azharuddin, Indian cricketer, nicknamed Azza
- Azza Air Transport, cargo airline based in Khartoum, Sudan
