= Nadhira Al Harthy =

Omani mountaineer and civil servant (1977–2026)

- نظيرة الحارثي
- Al Harthy in 2026
- Born: Nadhira bint Ahmed Abdullah Al Harthy; 21 November 1977; Al Mudhayrib, Al Sharqiyah, Oman
- Died: 30 July 2026 (aged 48); Broad Peak, Gilgit-Baltistan, Pakistan
- Cause of death: 2026 Broad Peak avalanche
- Education: Rustaq College of Education
- Occupations: Civil servant; mountaineer
- Employer: Oman's Ministry of Education
- Known for: First Omani woman to summit Mount Everest, K2, Nanga Parbat

Nadhira bint Ahmed Abdullah Al Harthy (or Alharthy; Arabic: نظيرة بنت أحمد عبد الله الحارثي or الحارثية; 21 November 1977 – 30 July 2026) was an Omani civil servant and mountaineer. She was the second person from Oman, and the first Omani woman, to climb Mount Everest. Al Harthy also summited several other eight-thousanders, including Manaslu, K2, and Nanga Parbat.

While traveling the world in an attempt to climb all 14 eight-thousanders, Al Harthy died as one of the victims of the 2026 Broad Peak avalanche.

== Early and personal life ==
Al Harthy was born on 21 November 1977 in Al Mudhayrib, a historic village in Al Sharqiyah. She was Muslim. She went to Rustaq College of Education, where she obtained a master's degree in geography. She worked for four years as a geography teacher before she became a civil servant who worked for Oman's Ministry of Education.

In 2015, Al Harthy brought a group of students to Tanzania to climb Mount Kilimanjaro as part of a project for the Ministry of Education. She tried to climb the peak, but was unable to do so because of altitude sickness.

== Climbing career ==
In 2017, she set herself the goal of climbing the world's highest peak. She had met Khalid Al Siyabi, who was the only Omani person at the time to have climbed Everest, which he had done seven years earlier. He came to the ministry where she was director of citizenship, and she was inspired. She went to the gym each week, and began running and climbing mountains in Oman. In 2018, she took part in the 130km Ultra-Trail Mont Blanc, which she eventually had to drop out of after 90 kilometres due to injury. That year, she also attempted to climb Nepal's Ama Dablam, but was unsuccessful. Instead of being discouraged, the experience only strengthened her resolve to climb the world's highest peak.

Al Harthy was training under the guidance of Al Siyabi, and for a long time, her ambition to climb Everest was a secret. She told her own family of the plan just two months before she set out.

=== Himalayan climbing ===
In 2019, Al Harthy became the second person from Oman and the first Omani woman to climb Mount Everest. This was the year in which the queues to climb the mountain became a news story, and also the year that her mentor died. She was part of a team that included Mona Shahab of Saudi Arabia and the Lebanese climbers Joyce Azzam and Nelly Attar. She reached the summit on the anniversary of her mentor's ascent, and she left his name at the top. The achievement was described as being by an "all-woman Arab team" and it was filmed by the Canadian climber Elia Saikaly.

In 2021, she returned to the Himalayas to summit Manaslu (8,156 meters). That year, she also became the first woman from the Arab world to climb Ama Dablam. This peak had defeated her before when she was training for her Everest ascent.

The following year, she became the first Omani woman to summit K2 (8,611 meters) in Pakistan. In 2023, she climbed the Matterhorn (4,478 m).

On July 10, 2024, Al Harthy summitted Nanga Parbat as part of a 10-person expedition team, and was the first person from Oman to summit the Himalayas' "Killer Mountain".

== Death ==
In 2026, Al Harthy traveled to Pakistan as part of her attempt to complete the 14 Peaks Project, an effort to climb all 14 eight-thousanders. She announced that her Pakistan expedition would include attempts on Broad Peak (8,051 m) and Gasherbrum I (8,080 m).

On 30 July 2026, during the expedition, Al Harthy's 10-climber team was caught in an avalanche on Broad Peak. On 31 July, the Alpine Club of Pakistan confirmed that she and the other nine climbers, including Nepalese Nirmal Purja, had died in the avalanche.

The Foreign Ministry of Oman publicly expressed condolences over Al Harthy's death and praised her efforts to strengthen relations between Nepal and Oman.
