= Joyce Azzam =

Lebanese mountaineer, motivational speaker, activist and conservation architect

- Born: 24 June 1984 (age 42); Beirut, Lebanon
- Citizenship: Lebanese
- Education: Lebanese University and Sapienza University of Rome
- Occupations: mountaineer, activist, architect, academic and motivational speaker
- Known for: Second Lebanese woman to climb Everest & all Seven Summits
- Website: joyceazzam.com joyceazzamkeynotes.com

Joyce Azzam (Arabic: جويس عزام; born June 24, 1984) is a Lebanese climber. She graduated with a Ph.D. in landscape and environment from the Sapienza University of Rome. Azzam now runs a mountaineering academy called MounTurtle. She is the first Lebanese woman and one of the first three Arab women to complete the Seven Summits after reaching the Everest top in May 2019.

== Biography ==
Azzam was born during the Lebanese Civil War in the capital city of Lebanon, Beirut. She suffers from a chronic lung condition and hypermobility syndrome. Azzam's childhood was very unstable and filled with obstacles. All she can remember is moving from bunker to bunker, continuously living underground. Moreover, she was never into sports due to her medical condition called hyperlaxity (joints in the legs are loose and the knees bend backward). She also has a fear of heights, known as acrophobia. She was always bullied at school because of her medical condition.

== Career ==
Azzam pursued both her higher studies in architecture at the Lebanese University and her career as a conservation architect between Rome and Los Angeles. She earned a Ph.D. in Landscape and Environment from the Sapienza University of Rome, as well as 3 master's degrees: one in Conservation of Historic Cities and Buildings, another in Governance Models and Management of Local Public System, and a final one in architecture.

She has become an advocate for women's and children's rights. Azzam has become the ambassador of the Lebanese Ice Hockey Federation (women's team) supporting women in sports. She has volunteered with the NGO Himaya as a child protection advocate and has been a motivational speaker for youth groups in many other countries. In the spring of 2022, Azzam became the ambassador of The Lebanese Mountain Trail and has walked the full trail from north to south.

On 23 May 2019, she successfully climbed Mount Everest thus becoming the third Lebanese person and fourth Arab woman to achieve the feat. She was part of a team which included Nadhira Al Harthy from Oman, Mona Shahab of Saudi Arabia and fellow Lebanese climber Nelly Attar. It was described as an "all-woman Arab team". While also accomplishing her summit of Mount Everest, she also completed the Seven Summits challenge in the due course. She became the second Lebanese woman to complete Seven Summits and to have previously climbed Denali in North America, Kilimanjaro in Africa, Elbrus in Europe, Puncak Jaya and Mount Kosciuszko in Oceania, Aconcagua in South America and Vinson Massif in Antarctica. She also faced financial difficulties and obstacles in 2015 when she was left with a lack of funds to complete the Seven Summits challenge and initially abandoned the plan.

Azzam went through intensive training of more than 20 hours per week. She was Himaya's ambassador and visits schools regularly to share her story and upcoming plans with more than 1,000 children and community members. Her main objective is to inspire the younger generations to pursue their dreams without fear and to be bold.

In 2023, Azzam was announced as UN Women Lebanon National Goodwill Ambassador.
