= Samira bint Mohamed Al-Moosa =

Omani diplomat

Samira bint Mohammed bin Moosa Al Moosa is a diplomat who became Oman's ambassador and permanent delegate to UNESCO on September 29, 2011.

== Biography ==
Al-Moosa holds a PhD in Early Childhood Education, from the University of Southern California, 1994. As the ambassador of Oman to UNESCO, she was elected as the representative of Oman to the executive board (2015-2019), and was nominated as the chair of two of its subsidiary committees: the Special Committee for 2015-2017 (SP), and the Programme and External Relations (PX) for 2017–2019. She also chaired the nomination committee during the UNESCO General Conference in 2017.

Before being appointed Permanent Delegate to UNESCO, Al-Moosa worked at Sultan Qaboos University, and served a member of the Oman State Council from 2003 to 2011. She is a leader in child care and education at both international and national levels. Internationally, she contributed to the preparation of the International Guidelines on Education and Care for Children. At the national level, she pioneered the early childhood program, developed effective teaching methods and linked them to community issues. She was the Director of the Child Care Center, founded on the campus of the Sultan Qaboos University. She also participated actively in the enactment of laws of child rights in the Sultanate of Oman, and is the board chair of the Children's Public Library of Muscat. Al-Moosa conducted a lot of research and gained a wide experience in the field of early childhood education, women's issues and society, with leadership experience and management skills in strategic planning, project formulation and implementation, programs revision, human resources development, as well as financial planning and budgeting.
