= Rawya Saud Al Busaidi =

Omani politician

Minister of Higher Education, Research and Innovation
- In office 8 March 2004 – 18 August 2020
- Monarchs: Qaboos bin Said; Haitham bin Tariq
- Prime Minister: Qaboos bin Said; Haitham bin Tariq
- Succeeded by: Rahma bint Ibrahim Al Mahrouqi

Personal details
- Education: Oxford University (PhD)

Rawya Saud Al Busaidi (Arabic: راوية بنت سعود البوسعيدية) is the first Omani woman to be appointed to a ministerial portfolio. Al Busaidi was Oman's Minister of Higher Education from 8 March 2004 until 18 August 2020, and she is the president of the council of Sultan Qaboos University.

She obtained a PhD from Oxford University. Before her appointment as Higher Education Minister, she held the position of higher education undersecretary. She won the Arab Woman Award three times and also received an honorary doctorate from the University of Glasgow.
