= Jackie Spinner =

American journalist

- Born: July 15, 1970 (age 56)
- Occupation: Journalist

Academic background
- Education: Southern Illinois University Carbondale; University of California, Berkeley

Jackie Spinner (born July 15, 1970) is an American journalist who worked for The Washington Post from 1995 to 2009.

== Biography ==
Spinner grew up in Decatur, Illinois, the daughter of a pipe fitter and a schoolteacher. She has a bachelor of science degree in journalism from Southern Illinois University Carbondale and a master's degree at the Graduate School of Journalism at the University of California at Berkeley.

Spinner was a U.S. Fulbright Scholar in Oman for the 2010–2011 academic year. She left the Post in 2009 and founded Angel Says: Read, an international literacy project based in Belize, Central America. In 2010, she returned to Iraq to start the award-winning AUI-S Voice, Iraq's first independent student newspaper at The American University of Iraq—Sulaimani. During her time as a Fulbright Scholar, Spinner taught digital journalism at Sultan Qaboos University in Oman, where she founded Al Mir’ah, the university's first independent student newspaper. Jackie writes, shoots photos and produces audio slideshows and video for the Web. She has contributed to the Christian Science Monitor, Chicago Tribune, Slate, Glamour, Aswat al-Iraq, American Journalism Review, Defense Quarterly Standard and U.S. Catholic News. She is the author of Tell Them I Didn't Cry: A young journalist's story of joy, loss and survival in Iraq (Scribner 2006). Jackie has reported from Iraq, Afghanistan, Jordan, Oman, Ecuador, Hungary, Spain, Morocco, Finland, Iceland and Kuwait. She is a member of the Society of Professional Journalists, Journalism and Women’s Symposium, College Media Advisers and Military Reporters & Editors Association.

Spinner arrived as the most junior member of The Washington Post bureau staff, working as a metro reporter and financial reporter, before becoming Baghdad Bureau Chief. In Iraq, she survived mortar attacks, car bombs, the Battle for Fallujah, and a kidnapping attempt outside of Abu Ghraib prison. She has contributed to MSNBC, PBS, CNN, BBC, ABC, and National Public Radio, and was featured in a PBS Frontline documentary on reporting the war in Iraq.

Spinner's most recent project was Don't Forget Me, a documentary about autism in Morocco. The film premiered at the Rabat International Film Festival.

She is currently an associate professor of journalism at Columbia College Chicago.

== Works ==
- Tell Them I Didn’t Cry (2006) ISBN 0-7432-8853-X
