= Abdullah Nasser bin Khalifa al-Harrasi =

Omani politician

Abdullah bin Nasser bin Khalifa al Harrasi
- عبد الله بن ناصر بن خليفة الحراصي
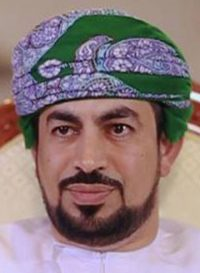

Minister of Information
- Incumbent
- Assumed office 18 August 2020
- Monarch: Haitham bin Tariq
- Prime Minister: Haitham bin Tariq
- Preceded by: Hamed bin Mohammed Al Rashdi

Personal details
- Education: Sultan Qaboos University (B.A), (M.A); Aston University (PhD)

Abdullah bin Nasser bin Khalifa al Harrasi (Arabic: عبد الله بن ناصر بن خليفة الحراصي; born 1971) is the Omani Minister of Information. He was appointed as minister on 18 August 2020.

== Education ==
Al Harrasi holds a Bachelor in English language and literature, a Master in language studies and translation from the College of Arts, Sultan Qaboos University and a PhD in translation studies from Aston University.

== Career ==
He held the position of Chairman of the Public Authority for Radio and Television (PART), with the rank of minister from 2011 to 2020, Chairman of the Board and Chief Editor of the Omani Encyclopedia Project, Assistant Professor at Sultan Qaboos University, and was an associate member of Oxford University between 2011-2012.

He became the Minister of Information for Sultanate of Oman on 18 August 2020. When asked by Atheer (an Omani media outlet) about his continuation in translation despite his many preoccupations, he replied: "I am continuing to translate on a personal level and I am translating various texts, and God willing, I will publish during the next stage my translations of travel literature in Oman."
