= Talal bin Suleiman Al Rahbi =

Omani politician (born 1974)

Talal Sulaiman Al Rahbi (born May 3, 1974) is an Omani economist and diplomat, currently serving as Oman's Ambassador to the United States of America.
