= Azza Al Ismaili =

Omani politician

Azza bint Sulaiman bin Saeed Al Ismaili
- عزة بنت سليمان بن سعيد الإسماعيلية

Minister of Technology and Communications (Oman)
- In office October 14, 2019 – August 18, 2020

Personal details
- Education: Sultan Qaboos University, Grand Canyon University
- Profession: politician, entrepreneur

Azza bint Sulaiman bin Saeed Al Ismaili is an Omani politician and entrepreneur who was appointed the position of Minister of Technology and Communications in the Government of the Sultanate of Oman, from October 2019 to August 2020.

== Education ==
Al Ismaili attended Sultan Qaboos University in the Sultanate of Oman where she received her bachelor's degree and then her master's degree in Computer Engineering. She then pursued to obtain her master's degree in Executive Business Administration from Grand Canyon University.

== Career ==
In 1994, Al Ismaili joined Petroleum Development Oman, where she spent ten years, and held several positions, including the business development engineer and project manager.

She has served as an official for the Telecommunications Regulatory Authority, and as a member of the Advisory Council of the College of Education at Sultan Qaboos University, and participated in the General Education Development Committee in the Sultanate of Oman since 2015. In 2017, Al Ismaili was selected and invited by the government of Oman to join the Oman 2040 Vision Development Group, in the General Secretariat of the Supreme Council for Planning.

In 2019, She was appointed by Sultan Qaboos bin Said pursuant to Royal Decree No. 68/2019 as the first minister of the Ministry of Technology and Communications, which was established in the same year by Royal Decree No. 63/2019, and remained in the position until August 18, 2020.
