= University of Nizwa =

Non-profit University in the Sultanate of Oman

- Motto: A beacon (minaret) of knowledge and enlightenment
- Type: Non-profit
- Established: 2004; 22 years ago
- Chancellor: Prof. Ahmed al-Rawahi
- Students: c.8,300
- Location: Nizwa, Ad Dakhiliyah, Oman; 22°54′39″N 57°40′20″E
- Website: www.unizwa.edu.om

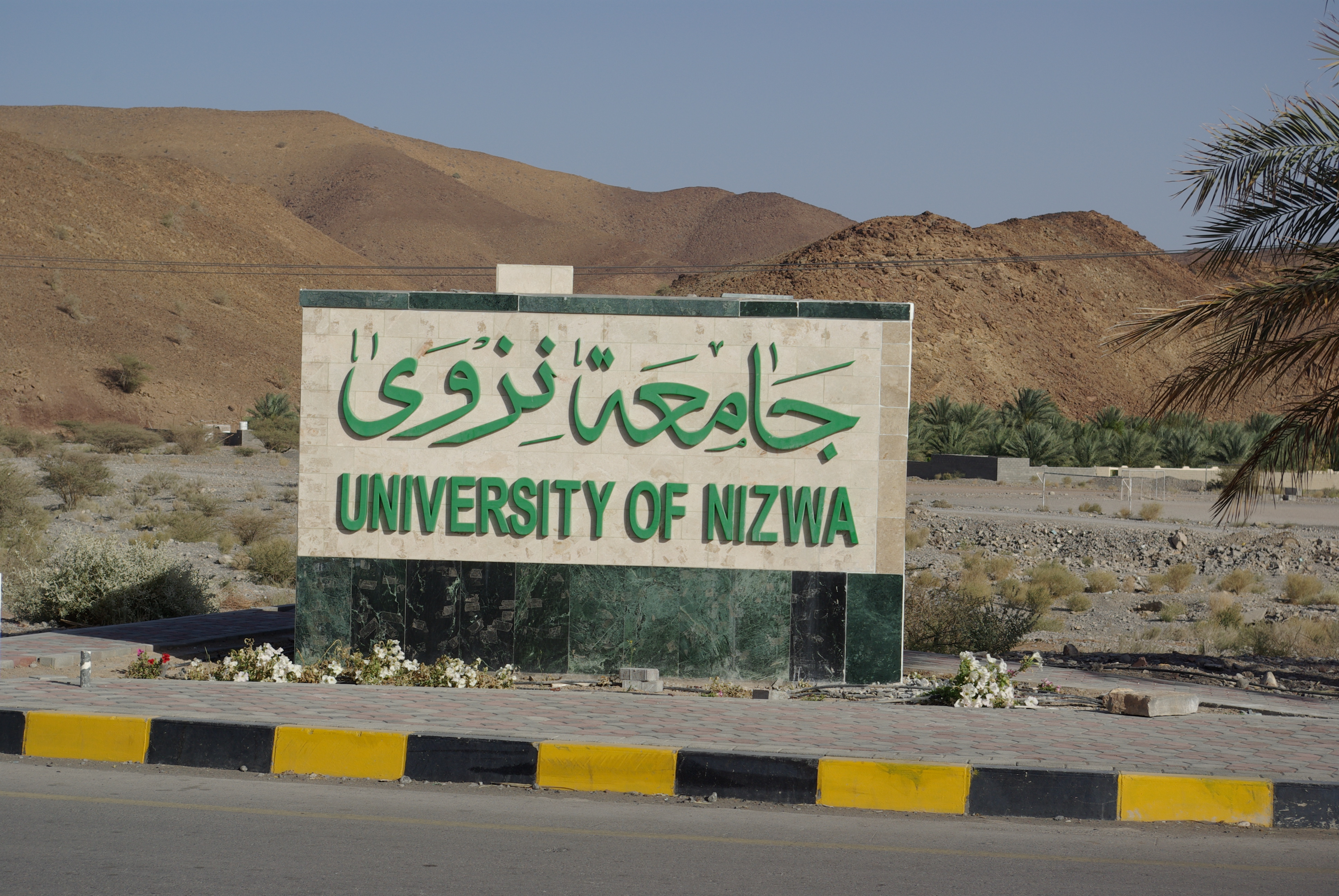
Sign for the university

The University of Nizwa (UoN) was established in 2002 by the Decree of Sultan Qaboos as the first non-profit university in the Sultanate of Oman. It remains the only institution of its kind in Oman.

Upon the satisfaction of all requirements set forth by the Oman Ministry of Higher Education and the Higher Education Council, the University of Nizwa was granted legal status by ministerial decision No. 1/2004 on January 3, 2004. On October 16, 2004, the University of Nizwa opened the doors to its inaugural class of 1,200 students, 88% of whom were Omani women. The existing campus is located near the base of the famous Jabal al-Akhdhar in Birkat al-Mouz, 20 km northwest of Nizwa. The construction of a new campus, located near the Farq-Hail highway, began in March 2010.

University rankings

Global – Overall
- QS World: 761-770 (2026)

== Faculty ==
Ahmed Al-Harrasi is a professor of organic chemistry.

George Kastanian is a former professor of computer sciences.

== See also ==
- List of universities and colleges in Oman
