= Azza El-Hassan =

Palestinian documentary filmmaker (b. 1971)

Azza El Hassan, born April 21, 1971, in Amman, Jordan is a Palestinian documentary filmmaker, cinematographer, producer and writer. Her documentary films mostly reflect her experience living in exile and her experience living in Palestine. One of her best known works is Zaman al-akhbar (2001).

== Early life and education ==
El-Hassan was born April 21, 1971, in Amman, Jordon where her parents, originally from Palestine, lived in exile. In September of that year, her family moved to Beirut, Lebanon, due to the aftermath of Black September. Living in Beirut was a difficult time for the family because Lebanon was also suffering from a civil war. She attended school in Beirut when the situation allowed it. She also volunteered in hospitals at the age of eleven during the 1982 invasion of Beirut by Israel. Soon after, her family moved back to Amman because of the war conditions in Beirut. The tragedy and war going on around her left a massive mark in her mind, and would later have an impact on her work.

After high school, El-Hassan made the decision to study filmmaking and sociology between the years 1989 and 1993 at Glasgow University in Scotland, a decision her parents were strongly against. She then went on to graduate from London University Goldsmith College in 1996 with an M.A in film and television documentary.

== Career ==
After her graduation, El-Hassan moved to Ramallah, Palestine and started her career in documentary film making. As a child of Palestinian parents, she needed find that part of herself due to the fact she lived in exile most of her life. Most of her work has focused on Palestinians who were born either in exile or in Palestine.

She would turn on her camera and film people that were shot, film them being taken to the hospital, and film their families as they buried them. At the start of her career, she would document the space she lived in and the emotion of each disaster she filmed. She started to notice that her documentaries resemble that of journalists and she wanted to change that because journalists only show the tragedy of the situation and never what people are making of the situation.

In 2019, she founded The Void Project, "that aims to restore archival films, curate exhibitions and produce narratives that centers around archive and the effect of their abduction on narratives."

=== Maysun wa Majida (Arab Women Speak Out, 1997) ===
In this film, El-Hassan portraits two women, Maysun and Majida. Maysun is strongly against her father who is forcing her to marry at the age of sixteen. Her father is physically abusive towards her, which she endured while she is in school. When she is in university she falls in love with a man who is from the same village as her, named Nafez, and marries him against his families wishes. Nafez's family rejects her because she is a fairly educated woman; now Maysun and Nafez are still married with five children.

In the second story is about Majida who is struggling against Israeli occupation. While pregnant she is arrested, tortured and threatened to be raped by Israeli soldiers. After her imprisonment her husband divorces her because he considers imprisonment an act of dishonour. She is then shown to be married for the second time and to be empowering women she they can be aware of their rights and what they are capable of.

=== Koushan Mousa (Title Deeds from Moses, 1998) ===
Koushan Mousa (1998) is a film about the settlement policies in Israel. The filmmakers film the Israel occupied territories after the Six Day War in 1967. They start their trip at the western edge of the Arab East Jerusalem, Ma'aleh Adumim. Israel plans to expand their settlement onto Palestinian villages, plans that would kill people and ruin their homes. The journalist in the film interviews human rights activists, Palestinians, and Israelis. The Israeli people claim that God promised them this land long ago so it is now their right to take it from the Palestinians and ruin five of their villages.

The film was shot on a MiniDV camera, to give the film "the feel of a video diary," and to move quickly to record the Arab villages before the expansion of the Ma'aleh Adumim colony caused them to disappear.

=== Zaman al-akhbar (News Time, 2001) ===
Zaman al-akhbar is said to be one of her well known films. When El-Hassan was trying to document her new film, her projects are all cancelled and she is told that people do not need to see films, they need to be informed about the news. El-Hassan challenges "what she calls “Newstime”—the understanding within the global imaginary that Palestinians are always living in a state of disaster." "Shot during the first few months of the second intifada, El-Hassan takes pictures of the dreary everyday life in Ramallah." El-Hassan wanted to document every day life and love apart from the war, following a love story between her landlord and his wife. However, they flee after an attack on Ramallah, and instead she follows four young boys who practice throwing stones in their neighborhood, now focusing the everyday that is still "connected to the collective story" of Palestinians.

=== Talata sintimetar (Three Centimeters Less, 2003) ===
Talata sintimetar follows "women who wish to reconcile with their family members by capturing their attempts to do so on tape." One woman, Ra'eda, attempts to connect with her father after he is killed in 1975 by Israeli soldiers by meeting people that knew him. Another woman, Hagar, left Palestine for Colombia and attempts to return after her husband is killed in a robbery, finding that Ramallah is under occupation. Her children, Samia, Surida and Sarah, ask Azza El-Hassan to make a film about their mother's life in order to reconcile their relationship.

The name of the film comes from "projections that the Palestinian children of today will grow up on average three centimeters shorter than their parents, thanks to the deprivations of occupation."

== Filmography ==
Title (Arabic)	Title (English)	Year
ميسون و ماجدة	Maysoon & Majida	1996
Khan Mousa	Title Deed from Moses	1998
Sindbad is She		1999
al-Saha	The Place	2000
Zaman al-akhbar	News Time	2001
Talata sintimetar	Three Centimetres Less	2003
Muluk wa Kumbars	Kings and Extras: Digging for a Palestine Image	2004
	Always Look Them in the Eyes	2009
	Euphoric Nights in Vienna	2014
	The Place 2	2019
	The Unbearable Presence of Asmahan	

== Awards and nominations ==
- In 1999 her film Kousha Mousa (Title Deed from Moses) won the Best Documentary Film at the Independent Film Festival in London
- In 1999 her film Kousha Mousa (Title Deed from Moses) was nominated for the Ogawa Shinuske Prize at the Yamagata International Documentary Film Festival
- In 2001 her film Zaman al-akhbat (News Time) won the Grierson Award for the Best Newcomer Film at the Jury Special Award at the Arab Screen Independent Film Festival
- In 2001 her film Zaman al-akhbat (News Time) was nominated for the Ogawa Shinsuke Prize at the Yamagata International Documentary Film Festival
- In 2006, her film Muluk wa Kumbars (Kings and Extras: Digging for a Palestinian Image) won the Luchino Visconti Award at the 63rd Venice International Film Festival.
- In 2015, her film The Unbearable Presence of Asmahan won the Aleph Documentary Award at the Beirut International Film Festival
