= Madeeha bint Ahmed bin Nassir al Shibaniyah =

Omani politician

Madeeha bint Ahmed bin Nasser al Shibaniyah
- مديحة بنت أحمد بن ناصر الشيبانية
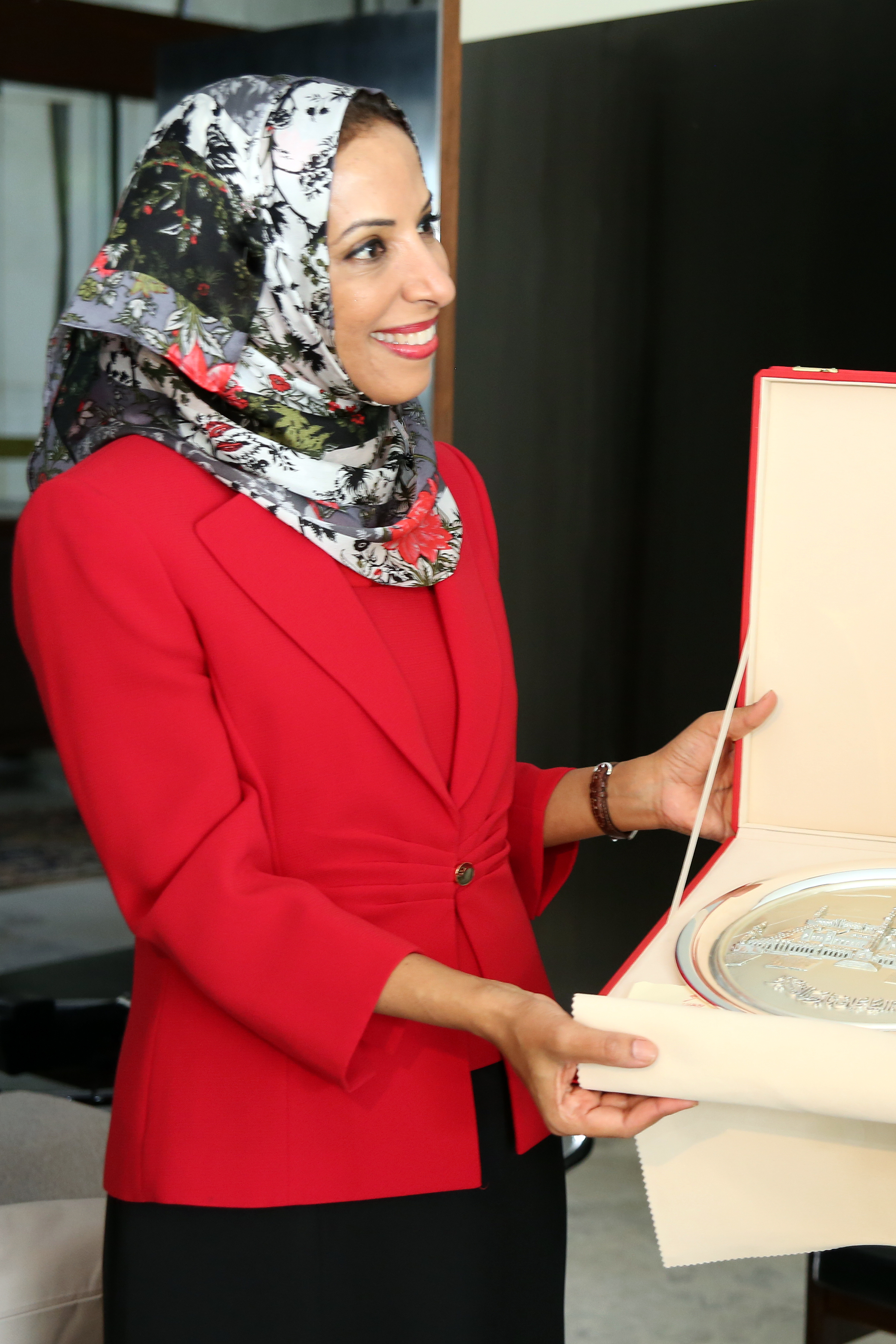
- Al Shibaniyah in 2013

Minister of Education
- Incumbent
- Assumed office 2011
- Monarchs: Qaboos bin Said; Haitham bin Tariq
- Prime Minister: Qaboos bin Said; Haitham bin Tariq
- Preceded by: Yahya bin Saud Al Sulaimi

Personal details
- Education: University of California (PhD)

Madeeha bint Ahmed bin Nasser al Shibaniyah (Arabic: مديحة بنت أحمد بن ناصر الشيبانية) is an Omani politician. She is the Minister of Education. She was appointed as minister in 2011 by Sultan Qaboos bin Said as the third woman in the history of Oman to hold a cabinet position in government. She replaced Yahya bin Saud Al Sulaimi.

== Biography ==
Al Shibaniyah graduated from the University of California, Santa Barbara with a PhD in Education. She is the chairperson of the Omani National Commission for Education, Culture, and Science. She is also the chairperson of the Supervisory Committee of the Specialised Centre for Professional Training of Teachers in Oman. In 2016, she inaugurated the library of the centre.

In 2017, the Forbes Middle East placed her seven on a list of most powerful Arab women in government. She hosted and sponsored the Second Gulf Forum on Nanotechnology in Oman in 2017.
