= Ahmed Al-Harrasi =

Omani chemist and academic (born 1974)

Ahmed Sulaiman Al-Harrasi
- Born: 13 October 1974 (age 52); Nizwa, Sultanate of Oman
- Education: Freie Universität Berlin
- Known for: Boswellic acids research
- Awards: Fulbright Award, National Research Award-TRC
- Scientific career
- Fields: Organic chemistry, Synthetic organic chemistry, Chemical biology
- Workplaces: University of Nizwa
- Thesis: New transformations of enantiopure 3,6-dihydro-2H-1,2-oxazines ring cleavages, ring enlargements and a novel approach to carbohydrate mimetics

Ahmed Sulaiman Al-Harrasi (Arabic: أحمد سليمان الحراصي; born 13 October 1974) is an Omani scientist and a professor of organic chemistry at the University of Nizwa, Nizwa, Sultanate of Oman.

== Education ==
Ahmed Al-Harrasi completed his Ph.D. from Freie Universität Berlin in Synthetic Organic Chemistry (New transformations of enantiopure 3,6-dihydro-2H-1,2-oxazines ring cleavages, ring enlargements and a novel approach to carbohydrate mimetics) in 2005. His name has appeared as the alumni Ph.D. Student of the Reissig Research Group at Freie Universität Berlin.

During 2007–2008 he served as an associate research professor under the Fulbright Visiting Scholar Program from Cornell University, Ithaca, the United States, with a project titled "Synthesis of Isotopically Labeled Thiamin Pyrophosphate for ESR Studies on the Hydroxyethylidene-Thiamine Pyrophosphate Radical Intermediate".

== Career ==
Ahmed Al-Harrasi is the vice-chancellor for graduate studies, research and external relations, and chairman of the Natural and Medical Sciences Research Center (NMSRC) at the University of Nizwa.

His name appeared in the list of Elsevier BV Data for "Updated science-wide author databases of standardized citation indicators" in 2019. In 2021, he was listed as one of the greatest chemists and scholars of all time in Germany. He is a member of the editorial board of the Elsevier Phytochemistry journal, and a member of the Global Frankincense Alliance (GFA) advisory board. He is nominated as a member of the Scientific Board of the International Basic Science Programme (IBSP). He is a board member of the Oman Academic Accreditation Authority and Quality Assurance (OAAAQA) and nominated as a member of an advisory committee of the First Gulf Chemistry Association (GCA 2022). He is a member of the scientific committee of the Middle East International Dermatology & Aesthetic Medicine Conference & Exhibition (MEIDAM). He has been appointed as a member of the Editorial Advisory Board for Phytochemistry Letters, a publication available on ScienceDirect.

== Research ==
Under his chairmanship of Oman's Medicinal Plants and Marine Natural Products, he and his team of researchers successfully isolated and enhanced the percentage of AKBA (beta-boswellic acid, keto-beta-boswellic acid, and acetyl-keto-beta-boswellic acid). He is investigating the potential use of extracts from frankincense to prevent or treat COVID-19 infection. He conducted a genome sequencing of naturally grown garlic and ginger to understand the plants' biosynthesis and how they synthesize antibiotics naturally. He is also involved in the genetic sequencing of COVID-19 variants in Oman, and detected a rare strain of COVID-19 in Oman.

== Participations ==
Ahmed Al-Harrasi was the winner of the 2016 National Research Award (NRA) in the Environment and Biological Resources category, given by The Research Council (TRC), Oman. He signed a research cooperation programme between Sultan Qaboos University and the University of Nizwa to enhance research and development.

- He was the chair of the first International Conference on Frankincense and Medicinal Plants: Recent Advances in Research and Industry held at Sultan Qaboos University, Muscat, Sultanate of Oman.
- He presented various scientific topics in natural and medical sciences at Hamad Bin Khalifa University (HBKU), Doha, Qatar.
- He participated in the annual session of the eighth meeting of the Education and Research Committee by the State Council, Sultanate of Oman, to discuss scientific research and development in private universities of the Sultanate of Oman.

== Award ==
Ahmed Al-Harrasi received the Order of Royal Commendation from His Majesty, The Sultan of Oman as an outstanding Omani individual for his remarkable contribution and active role in research.

== Patent ==
- Budesonide Nano Prodrug.

== Books ==
- Chemistry and Bioactivity of Boswellic Acids and Other Terpenoids of the Genus Boswellia, Authors: Ahmed Al-Harrasi, Hidayat Hussain, René Csuk, Husain Khan Print ISBN 9780081024416, Electronic ISBN 9780081024485
- Biology of Genus Boswellia, Authors: Ahmed Al-Harrasi, Abdul Latif Khan, Sajjad Asaf, Ahmed Al-Rawahi, Springer. ISBN 978303016725-7
- Role of Essential Oils in the Management of COVID-19, Authors:Ahmed Al-Harrasi, Saurabh Bhatia, Tapan Behl, Deepak Kaushik, Md. Khalid Anwer, Mohammed Muqtader Ahmed, P.B. Sharma, Md. Tanvir Kabir, Vineet Mittal, Ajay Sharma, Routledge. ISBN 978103200817-2
