= Azza Fahmy =

Egyptian jewelry designer

Azza Fahmy is an Egyptian jewellery designer, and the founder of the design house Azza Fahmy Jewellery. Fahmy was the first woman to train in Egypt's jewellery quarter, Khan El Khalili. In 2013 Fahmy founded ‘The Design Studio by Azza Fahmy’, in partnership with Alchimia, Contemporary Design School in Florence.

== Early life and career ==
Born and raised in Sohag in Upper Egypt, Azza Fahmy graduated from Helwan University with a Bachelor of Arts in Interior Design. In 1969, she stumbled upon a medieval jewellery design book, which became an inspiration for her work. Then a government employee, she kept her day job but ventured into Cairo's jewellery quarter to learn at the hands of the techniques of the craft at the hands of master goldsmiths. It was in these workshops that Fahmy worked on her very first designs. In the mid-1970s the British Council offered her a fellowship to study jewellery design at Sir John Cass College, where she learnt theory and manufacturing techniques. Upon her return, she set up her first workshop with two employees.

From her earliest designs, Fahmy's work has always been inspired by culture and heritage both local and global. One of her first collections, 'Houses of the Nile', brought some aspects of the Egyptian lifestyle.

One of Fahmy's trademarks is Arabic calligraphy using traditional proverbs and verses of celebrated scholars, poets and artists. The calligraphy inscriptions include words sung by legendary Egyptian singer Umm Kulthoum, to whom two collections are dedicated, as well as verses and proverbs by Rumi, Gibran Khalil Gibran, Rabaa Al-Adawiya, and many more. The preservation of ancient jewellery-making techniques and the jewellery craft is the premise of Azza Fahmy's brand.

== Accomplishments ==
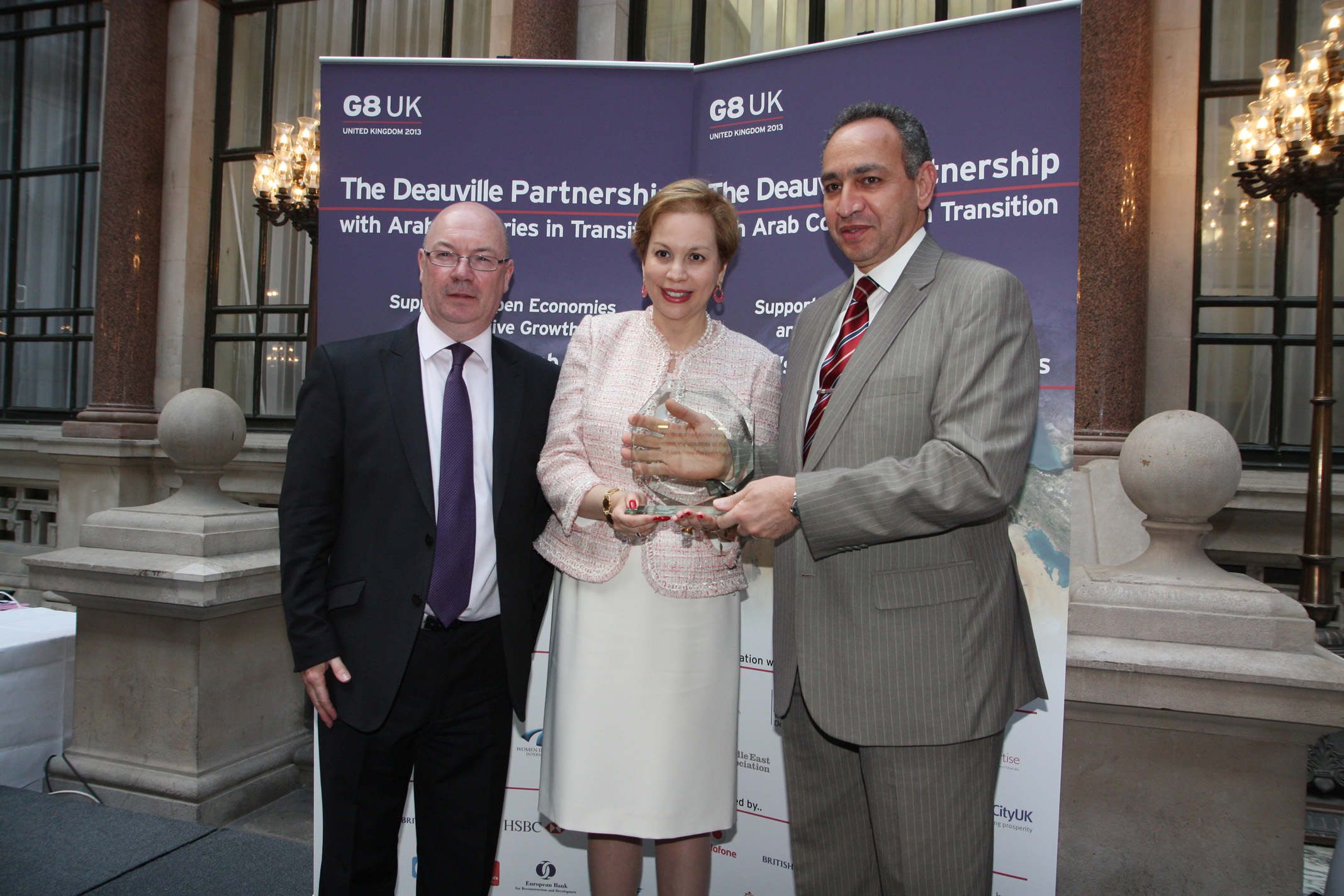
Azza Fahmy, Chairwoman and Chief Designer, Jewellery of Egypt was awarded the Outstanding contribution to retail industry Award. The prize was collected by the Egyptian Ambassador to the UK Ashraf Elkholy, 26 June 2013.

In 2006, Fahmy collaborated with Julien Macdonald at London Fashion Week, followed by a collaboration with Preen at New York Fashion Week in February 2010. In early 2012, she worked with the British Museum on the exhibition ‘Hajj: journey to the heart of Islam’, creating a 9-piece bespoke collection. Fahmy partnered with the British Museum once more in 2015 on their exhibition ‘Egypt: Faith after the Pharaos’.

In 2007, Fahmy published her book, titled 'Enchanted Jewelry of Egypt', recounting her journey through Egypt to discover the traditional jewelry crafted and worn in different areas of the country. Further discussed in her book, she explores a concept that became prevalent in her jewelry, how women intersect wealth, status, and security through their collection of jewelry. Many Egyptian girls begin this tradition at a young age to build exponentially over time, such their assets grow toward their future.

In 2009 at the John F. Kennedy Center for the Performing Arts, a three-week festival was held titled "Arabesque: Arts of the Arab World" where Fahmy showcased her jewelry. The festival gave many Arab artists visas so that they could travel to the US safely in a time where there was increased awareness of Arab people and politics.

== Collaborations ==
- Azza Fahmy for Julien Macdonald A/W '08 - A two-year collaboration on the catwalk.
- Preen A/W ‘11 - A collection inspired by fabrics and patterns used to create Preen’s A/W designs. The collection consisted of multi-faceted chokers, cuffs, earrings, rings and a 3D belt.
- The British Museum - The Egyptian designer first collaborated with the British Museum on the exhibition ‘Hajj: journey to the heart of Islam’ which first opened January 2012. Azza Fahmy created a 9-piece bespoke collection inspired by Hajj or pilgrimage journey and the spiritual objects and symbols that are part of it. The ‘Egypt: Faith after the Pharaohs’ exhibition in 2015 marked Fahmy’s second collaboration with the museum, the collection incorporated elements from the exhibition and featured Arabic calligraphy.
- Matthew Williamson A/W’14 - A cosmos-themed jewellery collection featured clustered stars, filigree motifs on crescent moons, and “Key of Life” pendants.
- Matthew Williamson S/S’14 - Ten pieces inspired by botanical prints, architectural forms and textures from Egypt and Persia.
- Karm Solar - A joint venture between Azza Fahmy Jewellery and Egyptian firm KarmBuild on designing the environmentally conscious KarmSolar Sahl Hasheesh Campus Headquarters, employing an abstract and artistic outlook on cultural influences.
