= Mubarak Al-Saadi =

Omani footballer (born 1988)

Personal information
- Full name: Mubarak Obaid Al-Saadi
- Date of birth: 28 February 1988 (age 38)
- Place of birth: Oman
- Height: 1.69 m (5 ft 6 1/2 in)
- Positions: Winger; left-back

Senior career*
Years	Team	Apps	(Gls)
2009–2015	Al-Gharafa		
2010–2011	→ Lekhwiya (loan)		
2012–2013	→ Al Kharaitiyat (loan)		
2013–2015	→ Al Ahli (loan)		
2015–2016	Al-Khor		
2016–2017	Al-Sailiya		
2017–2018	Al-Markhiya		
- * Club domestic league appearances and goals

Mubarak Al-Saadi (Arabic:مبارك السعدي; born 28 February 1988) is an Omani footballer.
