= Omani Women's Association =

Omani Women’s Association (OWA) is a women's organization in Oman, founded in 1970. It was the first women's organization in Oman, and as such the beginning of the women's movement in Oman. The Association provide support educational and professional rights for women.

== History ==
The foundation of the Omani Women’s Association took place during a period of intense modernization reforms introduced after the accession of the new Sultan in 1970. After the 1970 Omani coup d'état, women's position in society was being reassessed in connection to the national modernization program.

During the regime of the former Sultan Said bin Taimur (r. 1938-1970), education had only been allowed abroad and people studying abroad had not been allowed to return to Oman.

Women lived in harem sex segregation and completely veiled outdoors, sexual slavery of women as concubines was allowed under slavery in Oman, and "Said was also found to have 150 women locked away in his palace".

After the Coup of 1970, a major modernization program was introduced to make Oman a modern country. Slavery was abolished, universial education was introduced, and women's position was reassessed; Omani men and women who had studied abroad were called to return to help rebuilt the country, and women were employed in the military, police force, education and civil service.

The new freedom for Omani women of the 1970s also included the freedom to unveil. A woman employed at the Omani television in the 1970s later commented:

"at that time, the only concern of Omani men and women was how to build the nation...How can we help each other to elevate the social and economic conditions of people. Women, like men were fighting for a better future for Oman. We women for instance managed to establish the first Omani Women's Association in 1972... I used to travel throughout the country with the production team, reporting on the achievements of the renaissance such as the development of new schools, health clinics and hospitals, we were men and women, and there was no real concern for me as a woman travelling and presenting a programme without veiling or without being accompanied by a male relative".

The OWA was founded in 1970 by two upper class women with ambition to help poor women, and their initiative was accepted with a decree the Sultan and the organization formally registered in 1971. As the first women's organization in Oman, it also became the start of the women's movement. The OWA established branches all over the country which opened centers where women could meet and receive lectures and education in basic hygiene, cooking and home keeping by Egyptian social workers.

The OWA became a state organization and placed under government control in 1978. In 1984 a Directorate General of Women and Child Affairs was established and the OWA became a sub state body under it.

The OWA came to be used by the state to managed women's issues, and the OWA was given support and funds from the government ministry of social development, and provided services such as lectures for women, kindergarten services, handicrafts training, and support for women seeking legal actions. In the 1980s, the labor market created an employment crisis, and the state policy changed its policy and encouraged women to engaged in social work such as care of the handicapped and invalids rather than other professions.

The modernization in women's rights in Oman was followed by municipial suffrage in Muscat in 1994 (with the first two women elected to the local Shura the same year), municipial suffrage in all Oman in 1996, and national suffrage in 2002. In 2008, women were granted the right to own land on the same terms as men.
