= Ministry of Education (Oman) =

Omani government ministry

Coordinates: 23°36′25″N 58°32′25″E

Sultanate of Oman Ministry of Education
- وزارة التربية والتعليم
- National emblem of Oman

Agency overview
- Jurisdiction: Government of Oman
- Headquarters: Muscat (Oman)
- Agency executive: Madeeha bint Ahmed bin Nassir al Shibaniyah, Minister
- Website: Official website

The Ministry of Education (MOE) is the Omani government ministry responsible for educational policy and administration. It oversees school education, vocational and technical education, and higher education. The ministry manages public educational institutions, regulates private educational institutions, and develops national education policies and curricula. On 12 January 2026, the Ministry of Higher Education, Research and Innovation merged with the Ministry of Education under Royal Decree 14/2026. Responsibilities relating to research and innovation were transferred to the newly established Research and Innovation Authority.

The current Minister of Education is Madeeha bint Ahmed bin Nassir al Shibaniyah, who was appointed in February 2011.

== History ==
The Ministry of Education traces its origins back to 16 August 1970, when the Ministry of Knowledge was established as part of Sultan Qaboos bin Said's initial Omani administration. On 2 January 1972, it was renamed the Ministry of Education. During the 1970s, it oversaw the expansion of public schooling across the country, introducing preparatory education in the 1972–73 academic year and secondary education the following year.

On 23 May 1982, Royal Decree 40/82 transferred responsibility for youth affairs from the Ministry of Information and Youth Affairs to the Ministry of Education. The latter was subsequently renamed the Ministry of Education and Youth Affairs. On 13 November 1986, Royal Decree 83/86 changed its name again, this time to the Ministry of Education and Youth. In December 1991, Royal Decree 113/91 established the Public Authority for Sports and Youth Activities, transferring the ministry's youth-related responsibilities to the new authority. The ministry then reverted to being known as the Ministry of Education.

== Notable people ==
Nadhira Al Harthy, the 2nd person from Oman and the first Omani woman to climb Mount Everest, worked for the ministry.
