= Azza bint Sultan Al-Qasimi =

Emirati artist and businesswoman (born 1973)

Sheikha Azza bint Sultan Al Qasimi (Arabic: الشيخة عزة بنت سلطان القاسمي; born 1973) is an Emirati artist and businesswoman.

She is the daughter of Sultan bin Muhammad Al-Qasimi, the sovereign ruler of the Emirate of Sharjah. She was educated in Dubai and at St Anthony's College, Oxford. She has joined in group exhibitions in United Arab Emirates, Jordan, Egypt, China and the United Kingdom. Her first solo exhibition was at the University of Oxford.
