= Sultan Qaboos University =

Public university located in al-Seeb, Oman

- جامعة السلطان قابوس (Arabic)
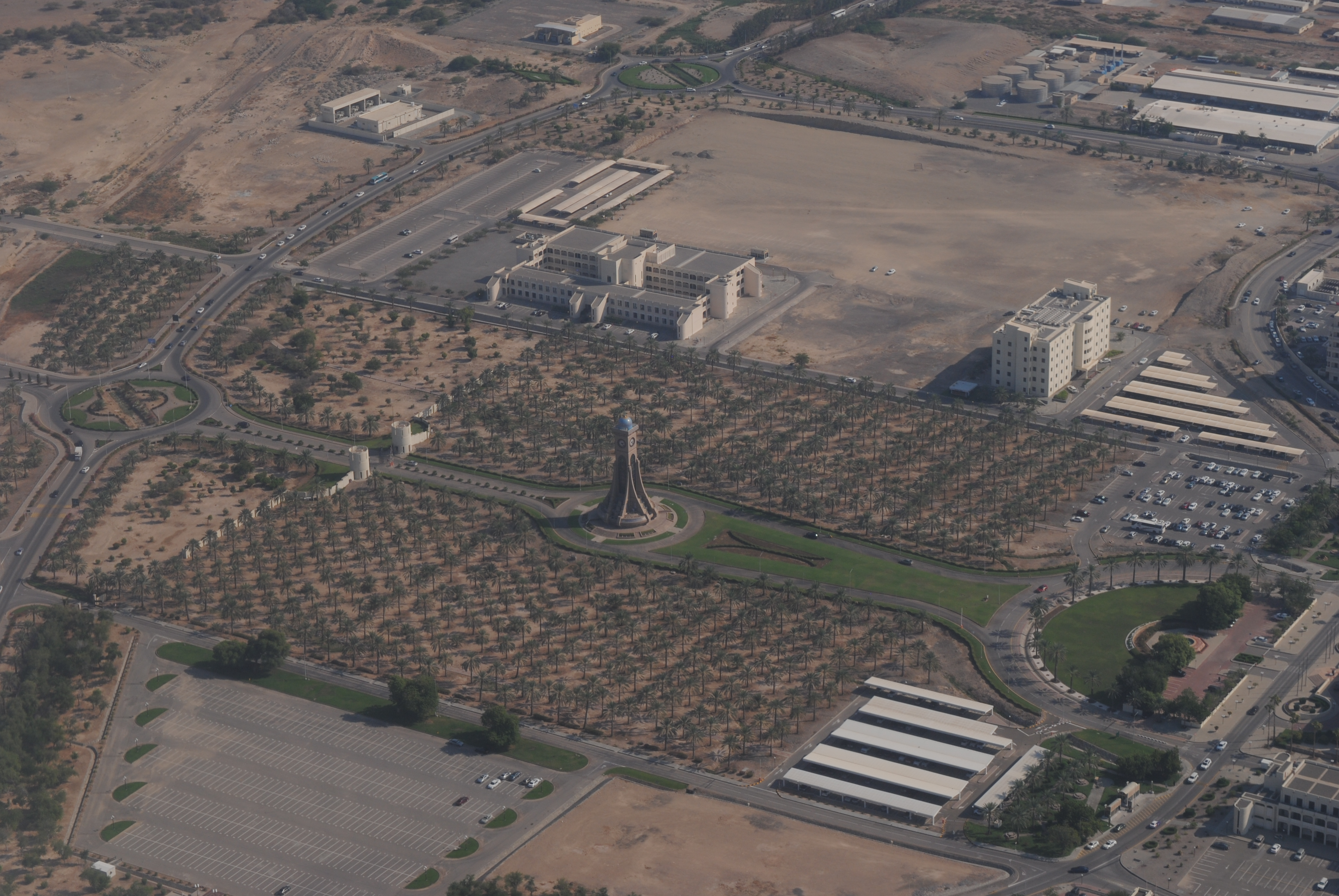
- Motto: اقرأ
- Motto in English: Read
- Type: Public
- Established: 1986; 40 years ago
- Vice-Chancellor: HH Dr. Fahad bin Al-Julanda bin Majed Al Said
- Undergraduates: 15,357
- Location: al-Seeb, Oman
- Campus: Urban
- Website: www.squ.edu.om
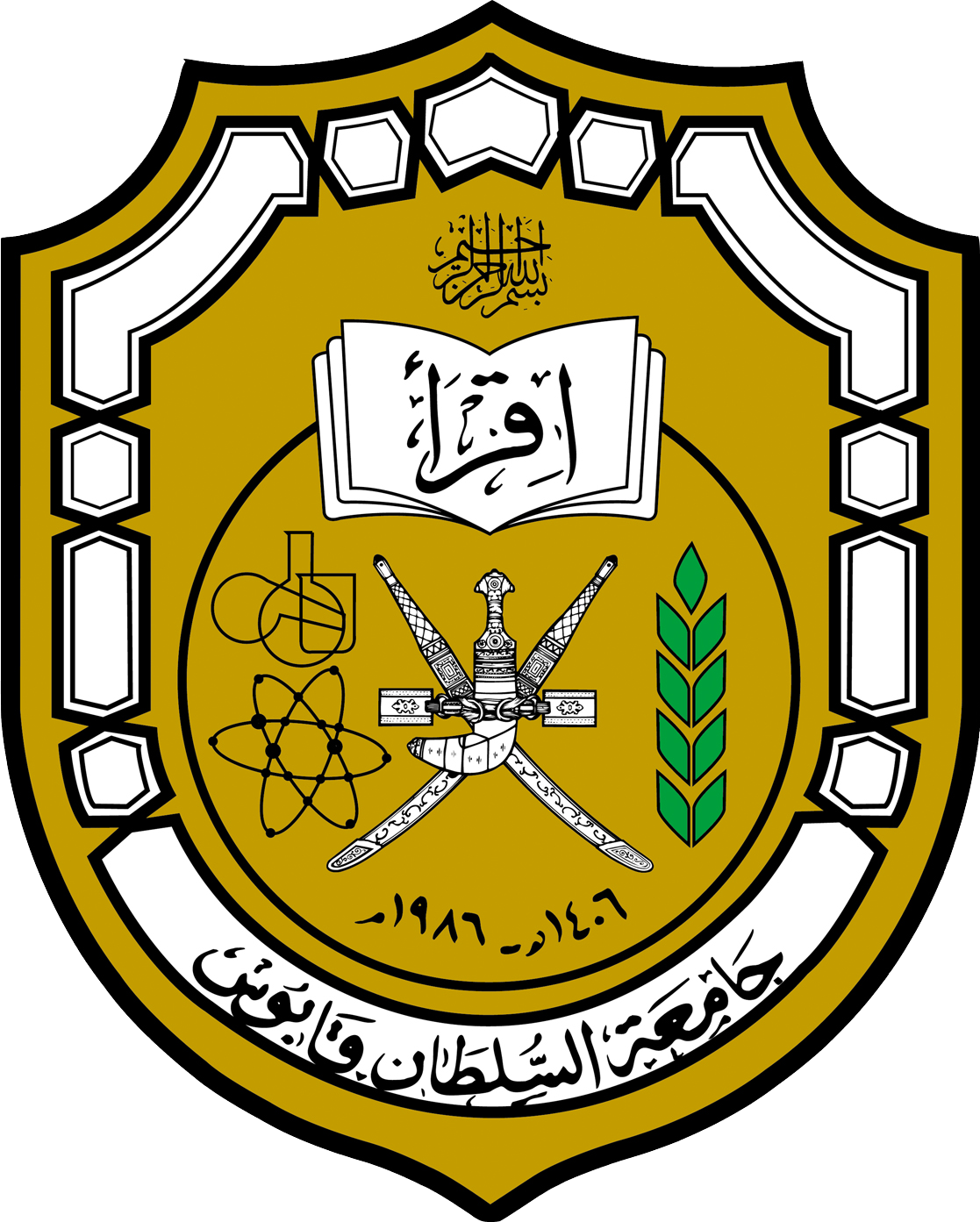

Sultan Qaboos University (SQU) (Arabic: جامعة السلطان قابوس) is a public university in al-Seeb, Oman. Established in 1986, it is one of the two public universities in the country and is named after Qaboos bin Said al-Said, the Sultan of Oman from 1970 until 2020.

Most students entering the university are selected based on their performance in high school final examinations. Student enrollment has grown from 500 in 1986 to more than 10,000 in 2005. More than half of the students live off campus due to space constraints. It currently has around 15,357 students of which 7,942 are female students and 7,415 are male students.

== Colleges ==
The university contains 9 colleges which are:

- Agricultural and Marine Sciences
- Art and Social Sciences
- Economics and Political Science
- Education
- Engineering
- Law
- Nursing
- Medicine and Health Science
- Science

== Notable faculty ==
- Dawn Chatty, anthropologist, associate professor from 1988 to 1994
- Jokha al-Harthi, writer
- Abdul Jerri, mathematician
- Jackie Spinner, journalist, worked for The Washington Post from 1995 to 2009
- Stanisław Świerczkowski, mathematician, 1986 to 1997

== Notable alumni ==
- Abdullah Nasser bin Khalifa al-Harrasi, is an Omani Minister of Information.
- Ahmed Al-Harrasi, is an Omani scientist and a professor of organic chemistry.
- Azza Al Ismaili, is an Omani politician and entrepreneur.
- Aisha bint Khalfan bin Jameel, is regarded as the first woman minister of Oman.
- Badriyya al-Shihhi, PhD in Chemistry, novelist
- Rumaitha Al Busaidi, is an Omani climate change activist.
- Lujaina Mohsin Darwish, is an Omani politician.

== Ranking ==
University rankings

Global – Overall
- ARWU World: 801–900 (2022)
- QS World: =334 (2026)
- THE World: 601–800 (2024)
- USNWR Global: =750 (2023)

Sultan Qaboos University (SQU) is ranked number 1 in Oman. SQU is ranked at number 362 in the world's top universities ranking by the London-based Quacquarelli Symonds (QS).

The university was ranked number 10 in the QS Arab Region 2019 ranking, and also placed in the 151-200 bracket in the QS Subject Matter Ranking.

== See also ==
- List of universities and colleges in Oman
- Sultan Qaboos University Library
