= List of currencies in the Arab world =

This is the list of the 22 currencies now in circulation in the Arab world.

== Currencies ==
Present currency	ISO 4217 code	Country or dependency (administrating country)	Currency symbol
Saudi riyal	SAR	Saudi Arabia	⃁
Algerian dinar	DZD	Algeria	دج (Arabic) or DA (Latin)
Bahraini dinar	BHD	Bahrain	.د.ب
Iraqi dinar	IQD	Iraq	ع.د
Jordanian dinar	JOD	Jordan	ينار
Kuwaiti dinar	KWD	Kuwait	ك
Tunisian dinar	TND	Tunisia	د.ت (Tunisian Arabic) or DT (Latin)
UAE dirham	AED	United Arab Emirates	AED
Moroccan dirham	MAD	Morocco	DH
Djiboutian franc	DJF	Djibouti	Fdj
Egyptian pound	EGP	Egypt	£E or ج.م or L.E.
Lebanese pound	LBP	Lebanon	£L and ل.ل
Sudanese pound	SDG	Sudan	SDG or ج.س
Syrian pound	SYP	Syria	£S
Omani rial	OMR	Oman	ر.ع
Qatari riyal	QAR	Qatar	ر.ق
Yemeni rial	YER	Yemen	﷼
Israeli new shekel	ILS	Palestine	₪
Somali shilling	SOS	Somalia	Sh.So.
Ouguiya	MRU	Mauritania	UM
