= Omani rial =

Currency of Oman

ريال عماني (Arabic)
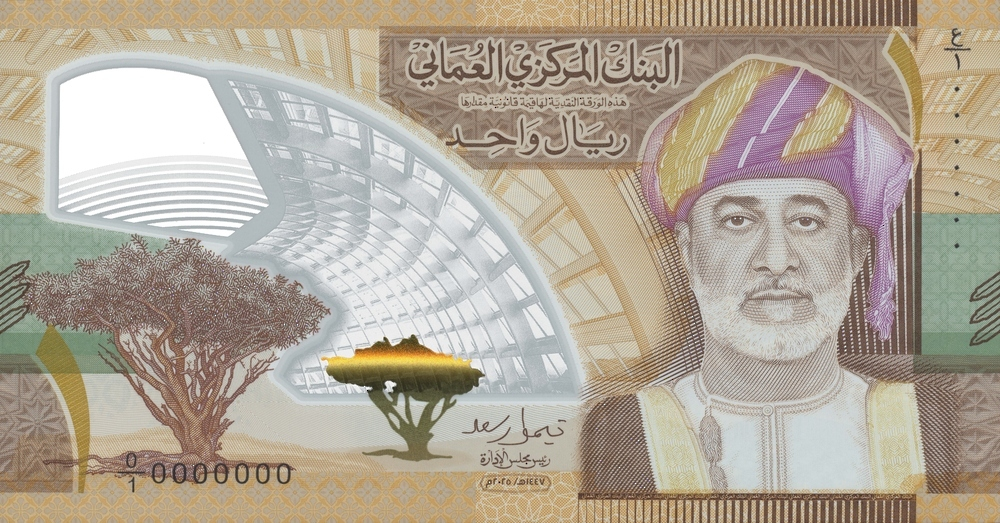
- Banknote of 1 Omani Rial (obverse)

ISO 4217
- Code: OMR (numeric: 512)
- Subunit: 0.001

Units of account
- Symbol: ⃄
- Subunit
- 1/1000: baisa

Denominations
- Banknotes
- Freq. used: 100 baisa, 1/2, 1, 5, 10, 20, 50 rials
- Coins
- Freq. used: 5, 10, 25, 50 baisa

Demographics
- User(s): Oman

Issuance
- Central bank: Central Bank of Oman
- Website: cbo.gov.om

Valuation
- Inflation: 4.1%
- Source: The World Factbook, 2011 est.
- Pegged with: US dollar (USD); 1 OMR = 2.6008 USD (exact); 1 USD = 0.3845 OMR (approx.)

The Omani rial (Arabic: ريال, symbol:; currency code: OMR) is the currency of Oman. It is divided into 1000 baisa (also written baiza, بيسة).

== History ==
Until 1940, the Indian rupee and the Maria Theresa thaler (known locally as the rial due to its similar size to the Spanish eight-real coin) were the main currencies circulating in Muscat and Oman, as the state was then known, with Indian rupees circulating on the coast and thaler in the interior. Maria Theresa thaler were valued at 230 paisa, with 64 paisa = 1 rupee.

In 1940, coins were introduced for use in Dhofar, followed, in 1946, by coins for use in Oman. Both coinages were denominated in baisa (equivalent to the paisa), with 200 baisa = 1 rial. The Indian rupee and, from 1959, the Gulf rupee continued to circulate. On 6 June 1966, India devalued the Gulf rupee against the Indian rupee. Following the devaluation, several of the states still using the Gulf rupee adopted their own currencies. Oman continued to use the Gulf rupee until 1970, with the government backing the currency at its old peg to the pound, when it adopted the Saidi rial.

On 7 May 1970 the Saidi rial (named after the House of Al Said, not to be confused with Saudi riyal) was introduced as the currency of Oman to replace the Gulf rupee. It was equal to the British pound sterling and 1 Saidi rial = 21 Gulf rupees. The Saidi rial was subdivided into 1000 baisa. The Omani rial replaced the Saidi rial at par on 11 November 1972. At that time, the currency became pegged to the US dollar at 1 Omani rial = US$2.895, instead of the pound sterling, a rate that would continue until 1986, when it was devalued by about 9% to 1 Omani rial = US$2.6008. The currency name was altered due to the regime change in 1970 and the subsequent change of the country's name. Since 1975, new coins have been issued with the country's name given as Oman.

=== Currency symbol ===
Omani rial currency symbol

In November 2025, the Central Bank of Oman (CBO) launched an official currency symbol for the Omani rial, with the aim of standardising how the currency is displayed on financial, commercial and digital platforms and strengthening its visual identity locally and internationally.

The symbol is included in Unicode version 18.0 as U+20C4 ⃄ OMANI RIAL SIGN, since September 2026.

== Coins ==
In the 1890s, coins for 1/12 and 1/4 anna (1/3 and 1 paisa) were minted specifically for use in Muscat and Oman.

In 1940, coins were issued for use in Dhofar in denominations of 10, 20 and 50 baisa. 1/2 rial coins were added in 1948, followed by 3 baisa in 1959. In 1946, 2, 5 and 20 baisa coins were introduced for use in Oman. These were followed, between 1959 and 1960, by 3 baisa, 1/2 and 1 rial coins.

In 1970, a coinage for all of Muscat and Oman was introduced. Denominations were 2, 5, 10, 25, 50 and 100 baisa. In 1975, new coins were issued with the country's name given as Oman. 1/4 and 1/2 rial coins were introduced in 1980.

Coins currently circulating are 5, 10, 25 and 50 baisa. On 20 May 2020, coins with denominations of 100 baisa and more lost their monetary value.

=== 1975 issue ===
Sultan Qaboos issue (1975)
Image	Value	Diameter (mm)	Mass (g)	Composition	Edge	Obverse	Reverse	Issue
	5 baisa	19	3.11	Bronze	Smooth	National emblem; Lettering: Qaboos bin Said, Sultan of Oman	Denomination in Arabic; Year of issue in Hijri and Gregorian	1975
	5 baisa	19	2.65	Copper-clad steel	Smooth	National emblem; Lettering: Qaboos bin Said, Sultan of Oman	Denomination in Arabic; Year of issue in Hijri and Gregorian	1999
	10 baisa	22.5	4.76	Bronze	Smooth	National emblem; Lettering: Qaboos bin Said, Sultan of Oman	Denomination in Arabic; Year of issue in Hijri and Gregorian	1975
	10 baisa	22.5	4.1	Copper-clad steel	Smooth	National emblem; Lettering: Qaboos bin Said, Sultan of Oman	Denomination in Arabic; Year of issue in Hijri and Gregorian	1999
	25 baisa	18	3	Copper-nickel	Reeded	National emblem; Lettering: Qaboos bin Said, Sultan of Oman	Denomination in Arabic; Year of issue in Hijri and Gregorian	1975
	25 baisa	18	2.63	Nickel-plated steel	Reeded	National emblem; Lettering: Qaboos bin Said, Sultan of Oman	Denomination in Arabic; Year of issue in Hijri and Gregorian	2008
	50 baisa	24	6.4	Copper-nickel	Reeded	National emblem; Lettering: Qaboos bin Said, Sultan of Oman	Denomination in Arabic; Year of issue in Hijri and Gregorian	1975
	50 baisa	24	5.57	Nickel-plated steel	Reeded	National emblem; Lettering: Qaboos bin Said, Sultan of Oman	Denomination in Arabic; Year of issue in Hijri and Gregorian	2008
	100 baisa	21.5	4.20	Copper-nickel	Reeded	National emblem; Lettering: Sultanate of Oman; Year of issue in Hijri and Gregorian	Lettering: Central Bank of Oman and value	1984
	1/4 riyal	26	6.5	Aluminium bronze	Lettered	National emblem; Lettering: Sultanate of Oman; Year of issue in Hijri and Gregorian	Lettering: Central Bank of Oman and value	1979
	1/2 riyal	30	10	Aluminium bronze	Reeded	National emblem; Lettering: Sultanate of Oman; Year of issue in Hijri and Gregorian	Lettering: Central Bank of Oman and value	1979

=== 2020 issue ===
Sultan Haitham issue (2020)
Image	Value	Diameter (mm)	Mass (g)	Composition	Edge	Obverse	Reverse	Issue
	5 baisa	19	2.64	Copper-clad steel	Smooth	National emblem; Lettering: Haitham bin Tariq, Sultan of Oman	Denomination in English and Arabic; Year of issue in Hijri and Gregorian	2020
	10 baisa	22.5	4.08	Copper-clad steel	Smooth	National emblem; Lettering: Haitham bin Tariq, Sultan of Oman	Denomination in English and Arabic; Year of issue in Hijri and Gregorian	2020
	25 baisa	18	2.65	Stainless steel	Reeded	National emblem; Lettering: Haitham bin Tariq, Sultan of Oman	Denomination in English and Arabic; Year of issue in Hijri and Gregorian	2020
	50 baisa	24	5.55	Stainless steel	Reeded	National emblem; Lettering: Haitham bin Tariq, Sultan of Oman	Denomination in English and Arabic; Year of issue in Hijri and Gregorian	2020

== Banknotes ==
On 7 May 1970, the Sultanate of Muscat and Oman issued banknotes in denominations of 100 baisa, 1/4, 1/2, 1, 5 and 10 rial saidi. These were followed by notes for 100 baisa, 1/4, 1/2, 1, 5 and 10 Omani rials issued by the Oman Currency Board on 18 November 1972.

From 1977, the Central Bank of Oman has issued notes, with 20 and 50 rial notes introduced that, followed by 200 baisa notes in 1985.

A new series of notes was issued on 1 November 1995, and the 5-rial notes and higher were updated in 2000 with foil strips.

In 2005, a red 1-rial note commemorating the 35th National Day was issued.

In 2010, new 5-, 10-, 20- and 50-rial notes were issued on the occasion of the 40th National Day. The 20-rial note is blue instead of green while the other notes are the same colour as previously.

In 2015, a purple 1-rial note commemorating the 45th National Day was issued.

After 30 July 2019, all banknotes issued before 1 November 1995 became invalid, as well as the 5 to 50 rial banknotes issued on that date without foil strips. The 5- to 50-rial banknotes of the 1995 series with foil strips, released into circulation from 2000, remained valid. Thus, as of 2020, banknotes in circulation are mainly the 2010 series of 5 to 50 rial, the 2015 1-rial note, and the 1995 series of 100 baisa and 1/2 rial. The 1995 200-baisa note, the 1995 and 2005 1-rial notes, and the 2000 release of 5- to 50-rial notes are still accepted but not commonly seen. Coins in circulation are mainly 25 and 50 baisa, with 5 and 10 baisa used in shops whose pricing requires them.

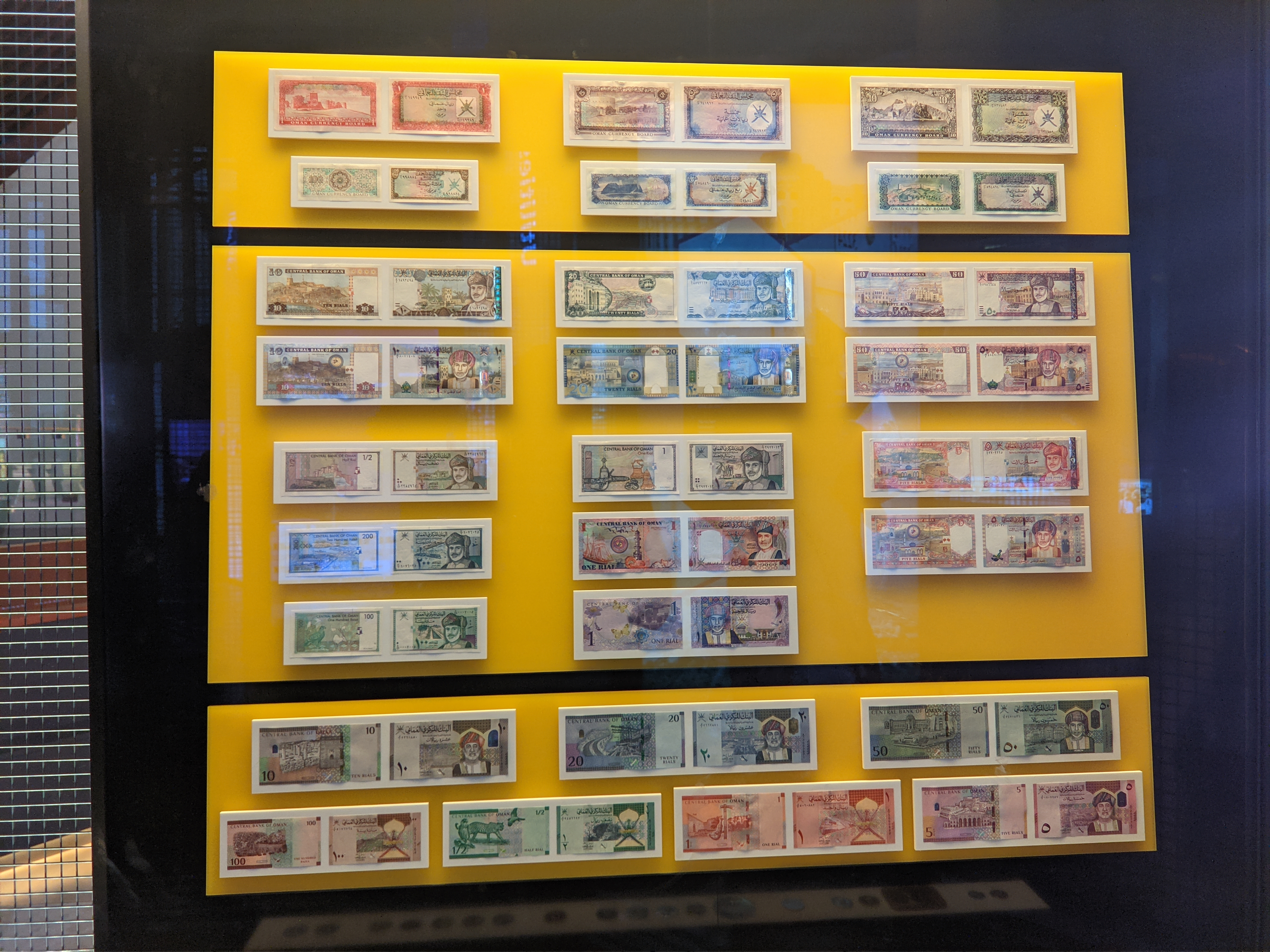
This image shows Omani banknotes from different years.

In 2020, a new series of banknotes from 100 baisa to 50 rials was released, with Sultan Haitham bin Tariq on the obverse. Since 1 January 2025, all previous banknotes are invalid and can no longer be exchanged, even at banks.

1973 Series
Image		Value	Main colour	Description	
Obverse	Reverse	Value	Main colour	Obverse	Reverse
		100 baiza	Brown		
		1/4 rial	Blue		
		1/2 rial	Green		
		1 rial	Red		
		5 rials	Purple		
		10 rials	Brown-black		

1977 Series
Image		Value	Main colour	Description	
Obverse	Reverse	Value	Main colour	Obverse	Reverse
		100 baiza	Orange		
		200 baiza	Purple		
		1/4 rial	Blue		
		1/2 rial	Green		
		1 rial	Red		
		5 rials	Maroon		
		10 rials	Brown-black		
		20 rials	Dark green		

=== Fourth issue ===
Fourth issue (1987-1990)
Image	Value	Main colour	Description		Date of issue
Image	Value	Main colour	Obverse	Reverse	Date of issue
	100 baisa	Red	Qaboos bin Said	Port Sultan Qaboos	1987, 1989, 1992, 1994
	200 baisa	Purple	Qaboos bin Said	Rustaq Fort	1987, 1993, 1994
	RO 1/4	Purple-Blue	Qaboos bin Said	Fishing trawler	1989
	RO 1/2	Green	Qaboos bin Said	Sultan Qaboos University	1987
	RO 1	Red	Qaboos bin Said	Sohar Fort	1987, 1989, 1994
	RO 5	Maroon	Qaboos bin Said	Nizwa Fort	1990
	RO 10	Dark brown	Qaboos bin Said	Al-Mirani Fort	1987, 1993
	RO 20	Green-Gray	Qaboos bin Said	Central Bank of Oman	1987, 1994
	RO 50	Dark green	Qaboos bin Said	Jabreen Fort	1985, 1992

=== Fifth issue ===
Fifth issue (1995)
Image	Value	Dimensions (mm)	Main colour	Description		Date of	
Image	Value	Dimensions (mm)	Main colour	Obverse	Reverse	issue	withdrawal
	100 baisa	122 x 64	Green	Qaboos bin Said, irrigation canal	Verreaux eagle, white oryx	1995	31 December 2024
	200 baisa	129 x 64	Blue	Qaboos bin Said, Salalah Airport and Muscat International Airport	Marine Science & Fisheries Center, Port Sultan Qaboos	1995	31 December 2024
	RO 1/2	136 x 64	Puce	Qaboos bin Said, Bahla Fort	Al-Hazim fort, Nakhal Fort	1995	31 December 2024
	RO 1	146 x 76	Purple	Qaboos bin Said, Sultan Qaboos Sports Complex	Omani khanjar, bracelets, ornaments, dhows	1995	31 December 2024
	RO 5	153 x 76	Red	Qaboos bin Said, Sultan Qaboos University	Nizwa	1995, 2000	31 December 2024
	RO 10	160 x 76	Brown	Qaboos bin Said, Burj al-Nahdah	Muttrah fort	1995, 2000	31 December 2024
	RO 20	167 x 76	Blue-green	Qaboos bin Said, Central bank	Muscat Securities Market, Rusayl industrial area	1995, 2000	31 December 2024
	RO 50	174 x 76	Burgundy	Qaboos bin Said, Al-Mirani Fort, Finance ministry	Commerce ministry	1995, 2000	31 December 2024
35th National Day issue (2005)
	RO 1	146 x 76	Red	Qaboos bin Said	RNOV Shabab Oman, Al Jalali Fort, minaret	2005	31 December 2024
40th National Day issue (2010)
	RO 5	153 x 76	Red	Qaboos bin Said, Sultan Qaboos University	Nizwa	2010	31 December 2024
	RO 10	160 x 76	Brown	Qaboos bin Said, Burj al-Nahdah	Muttrah fort	2010	31 December 2024
	RO 20	167 x 76	Blue	Qaboos bin Said, Sultan Qaboos Grand Mosque	Royal Opera House Muscat	2010	31 December 2024
	RO 50	174 x 76	Burgundy	Qaboos bin Said, Al-Mirani Fort, Finance ministry	Commerce ministry	2010	31 December 2024
45th National Day issue (2015)
	RO 1	140 x 71	Purple	Qaboos bin Said, Al Alam Palace	Sultan Qaboos University	2015	31 December 2024

=== Sixth issue ===
Sixth issue (2020)
Image	Value	Dimensions (mm)	Main colour	Description		Date of issue
Image	Value	Dimensions (mm)	Main colour	Obverse	Reverse	Date of issue
	100 baisa	122 x 64	Brown	National emblem; Jebel Akhdar terraces	Falaj Al-Jeela; Coconut trees and palm groves	2021
	RO 1/2	136 x 64	Green	National emblem; Ain Khor and frankincense	Arabian leopard and sooty falcon	2021
	RO 1	146 x 76	Red	National emblem; Oman Across Ages Museum	Khasab Castle, Wadi Al-Ayn tombs, Jirz axe, Omani khanjar	2021
	RO 5	153 x 76	Pink	Haitham bin Tariq; Sultan Qaboos University	Royal Opera House Muscat	2021
	RO 10	160 x 76	Beige	Haitham bin Tariq; Sultan Qaboos Grand Mosque	Al-Baleed Great Mosque; Niche of al-Uweyna Mosque	2021
	RO 20	167 x 76	Blue	Haitham bin Tariq; Muscat International Airport	Batinah Expressway; Salalah International Airport; Sohar Industrial Port	2021
	RO 50	174 x 76	Green	Qaboos bin Said; Central bank building	Council of Oman; Ministry of Finance; Supreme Court	2020

=== 2025 Commemorative Polymer Banknote issue ===
First Polymer Banknote issue (2025)
Image	Value	Dimensions (mm)	Composition	Obverse	Reverse	Issue
	RO 1	145x76 mm	Polymer	Haitham bin Tariq: Oman Batonic Garden	Sayyed Tariq bin Taimur Cultural Complex; Duqm Port	2025

== Exchange rates ==
From 1973 to 1986, the rial was pegged to the U.S. dollar at 1 Omani rial = US$2.895. The rate was changed in 1986 to 1 Omani rial = US$2.6008, which translates to approximately US$1 = 0.384497 rial. It is as of 2024 the third-highest-valued currency unit in the world after the Kuwaiti dinar and the Bahraini dinar. As of 2025 still, the Central Bank of Oman bought U.S. dollars at 0.384 Omani rial, and sold U.S. dollars at 0.385 Omani rial.

Current OMR exchange rates
From Google Finance:	AUD CAD CHF CNY EUR GBP HKD JPY USD INR CNY KRW
From Yahoo! Finance:	AUD CAD CHF CNY EUR GBP HKD JPY USD INR CNY KRW
From XE.com:	AUD CAD CHF CNY EUR GBP HKD JPY USD INR CNY KRW
From OANDA:	AUD CAD CHF CNY EUR GBP HKD JPY USD INR CNY KRW

Note: Rates obtained from these websites may contradict with pegged rate mentioned above.

== See also ==
- Economy of Oman
- Gulf Cooperation Council – Middle East regional union and alliance
- Iranian rial – Currency of Iran
- Qatari riyal – Currency of Qatar
- Saudi riyal – Currency of Saudi Arabia
- Yemeni rial – Currency of Yemen

Preceded by: Gulf rupee Ratio: 1 rial = approximately 21 rupees = 1 British pound	Currency of Oman; 1970 – Note: known as "rial Saidi" before 1973, since known as "rial Omani"	Succeeded by: Current
