= Iraqi dinar =

Currency of Iraq

الدينار العراقي (Arabic); دیناری عێراقی (Kurdish)
- IQD 25,000 banknote from the 2003 series

ISO 4217
- Code: IQD (numeric: 368)
- Subunit: 0.001

Units of account
- Symbol: IQD or د.ع
- Subunit
- 1/1000: fils

Denominations
- Banknotes
- Freq. used: IQD 250, IQD 500, IQD 1,000, IQD 5,000, IQD 10,000, IQD 25,000
- Rarely used: IQD 50,000
- Coins: IQD 25, IQD 50, IQD 100

Demographics
- User(s): Iraq

Issuance
- Central bank: Iraq Currency Board (1932–1949); National Bank of Iraq (1949–1956); Central Bank of Iraq (1956–)
- Website: www.cbi.iq

Valuation
- Inflation: 0.8%
- Source: Central Bank of Iraq, Q2 of 2025

The Iraqi dinar (code: IQD; Arabic: الدينار العراقي), Arabic pronunciation: [diːˈnɑːr]) is the currency of Iraq. The Iraqi dinar is issued by the Central Bank of Iraq (CBI). On 12 December 2025, the exchange rate with the US dollar was US$1 = 1418 dinars.

== History ==
The Iraqi dinar entered circulation on 1 April 1932, replacing the Indian rupee, which had been the official currency since the British occupation of the country in World War I, at a rate of 1 dinar = 11 rupees. The dinar was pegged at par with sterling until 1959 when, without changing its value, the peg was switched to the United States dollar at the rate of IQD 1 = US$2.80. By not following the US devaluations in 1971 and 1973, the official rate rose to US$3.3778, before a 5% devaluation reduced its rate to US$3.2169, a rate which remained until the Gulf War in 1990, although in late 1989 the black market rate was reported at five to six times higher than the official rate.

=== Post-1990 developments ===
After the Gulf War in 1990, due to UN sanctions, Iraq was no longer able to place orders with the British security printing firm De La Rue for further issues of the previously high quality notes, so new notes were produced. The pre-1990 notes became known as Swiss dinars while the new dinar notes were called Iraqi dinars. Due to United States and the international sanctions on Iraq along with excessive government printing, the Iraqi dinar currency devalued quickly. By late 1995, US$1 was valued at 3,000 Iraqi dinars on the black market.

During the Iraqi no-fly zones conflict, Swiss dinars notes continued to circulate in the then politically isolated Kurdish-populated northern Iraq. The northern Iraqi Kurdistan government that was created as a result, refused to accept the inflated Iraqi dinar notes (which were issued in huge amounts). Since the supply of Iraqi dinar notes increased while the supply of Swiss dinar notes remained stable (even decreased because of notes taken out of circulation), the Swiss dinar notes appreciated against the Iraqi dinar note. By having its own stable supply of the Swiss Iraqi dinars, the politically isolated region effectively evaded inflation, which ran rampant throughout the rest of the country.

After Saddam Hussein was deposed in the 2003 invasion of Iraq, the Iraqi Governing Council and the Office for Reconstruction and Humanitarian Assistance printed more Iraqi dinar notes as a stopgap measure to maintain the money supply until a new currency could be introduced.

Between 15 October 2003 and 15 January 2004, the Coalition Provisional Authority issued new Iraqi dinar notes and coins, with the notes printed by De La Rue again, using modern anti-forgery techniques to "create a single unified currency that is used throughout all of Iraq and will also make money more convenient to use in people's everyday lives". Multiple trillions of dinars were shipped to Iraq and secured in the Central Bank to exchange for Iraqi dinar notes. Saddam dinar notes were exchanged for the new dinars at par, while Swiss dinar notes were exchanged at a rate of one Swiss dinar = 150 new dinars.

Inflation and depreciation of the currency has continued since. On 19 December 2020, Iraq's Central Bank devalued the dinar by 24% to improve the government's revenue, which was affected by the COVID-19 pandemic and low oil prices. On 2 March 2019, the Central Bank's indicative exchange rate was IQD 1,190 = US$1. and on 18 June 2021 it was IQD 1,460.5000 = US$1.

There is considerable confusion (perhaps intentional on the part of dinar sellers) around the role of the International Monetary Fund in Iraq. The IMF as part of the rebuilding of Iraq is monitoring Iraq's finances and for this purpose uses a single rate (not a sell/buy) of IQD 1170 per US$. This "program rate" is used for calculations in the IMF monitoring program and is not a rate imposed on Iraq by the IMF. For a wider history surrounding currency in the region, see British currency in the Middle East.

=== Use in speculation and fraud since the Iraq war (2003–present) ===
There is little international demand for dinars, since Iraq has few exports other than oil, which is sold in US dollars. Thus there is often an extremely high exchange rate for dinars compared with other currencies.

However, the downfall of Saddam Hussein resulted in the development of a multi-million dollar industry involving the sale of dinars to speculators. Such exchange services and companies sell dinars at an inflated price, pushing the idea that the dinar would sharply increase in value to a profitable exchange rate some time in the future, instead of being redenominated. This activity can be either a legitimate service to currency speculators, or foreign exchange fraud: at least one major such currency exchange provider was convicted of fraud involving the dinar. This trade revived after the election of Donald Trump in November 2016, with many buyers believing that Trump would cause a sharp revaluation in the dinar (often referred to by the abbreviation "RV" by supporters of the dinar trade) to an exchange rate comparable to the US dollar.

In 2014, Keith Woodwell (director of the Utah Division of Securities) and Mike Rothschild (writer for Skeptoid blog) stated that the speculation over the Iraqi dinar originated from a misunderstanding of why the value of the Kuwaiti dinar recovered after the First Gulf War, leading to an assumption that the Iraqi dinar would follow suit after the fall of Saddam: Woodwell and Rothschild noted substantial differences in economic and political stability between Iraq and Kuwait, with Iraq facing pervasive sectarian violence amid near-total reliance on oil exports.

In response to the growing concerns about fraud and scams related to investment in the Iraqi dinar, state agencies in Washington, Utah, Oklahoma, Alabama and others issued statements and releases warning potential investors. Further alerts were issued by news agencies. These alerts usually warn potential investors that there is no place outside Iraq to exchange the dinar, that they are typically sold by dealers at inflated prices, and that there is little evidence to substantiate the claims of significant appreciation of their investment due to revaluation of the currency.

In February 2014, the Better Business Bureau included foreign currency scams, such as investing in the dinar, as one of the ten most notable scams in 2013.

=== Digital Dinar ===
In 2025 and 2026,the Central Bank of Iraq announced plans to launch a central bank digital currency, referred to as the digital dinar or digital Iraqi dinar.

== Coins ==
Coins were introduced in 1931 and 1932 in denominations of round 1 and 2 fils in bronze, and scalloped 4 and 10 fils in nickel. 20, 50, and 200 fils were 50% silver. The 200 fils coin is also known as a rial. Bronze substituted nickel in the 5 and 10 fils from 1938 to 1943 during the World War II period and reverted to nickel in 1953. Silver 100 fils coins were also introduced in 1953. These coins first depicted King Faisal I from 1931 to 1933, King Ghazi from 1938, and King Faisal II from 1943 until the end of the kingdom.

Following the establishment of the Iraqi Republic, a new series of coins was introduced in denominations of 1, 5, 10, 25, 50, and 100 fils, with the 25, 50, and 100 fils in silver until 1969. In this series an allegorical sun replaced the image of the king, shapes and sizes remained the same with the exception of the 1 fil which was decagon shaped. This image was then replaced by three palms in 1968. In 1970, 250 fils pieces were introduced, followed by 500 fils and IQD 1 coins in 1982. A number of the coins for 1982 were a commemorative series celebrating Babylonian achievements. During this period, many of the coins were identified by their shape due to being made of similar composition metals, as from 1980 onward 250 fils were octagonal, 500 fils square, and IQD 1 decagon shaped. Coin production ceased after 1990 due to the emergency conditions generated by the Gulf War and international sanctions.

In 2004, a new series of coins were issued in denominations of IQD 25, IQD 50 and IQD 100 and were struck in bronze, brass, and nickel-plated steel respectively. They are sparse in design and depict an abstract map of Iraq and the main rivers.

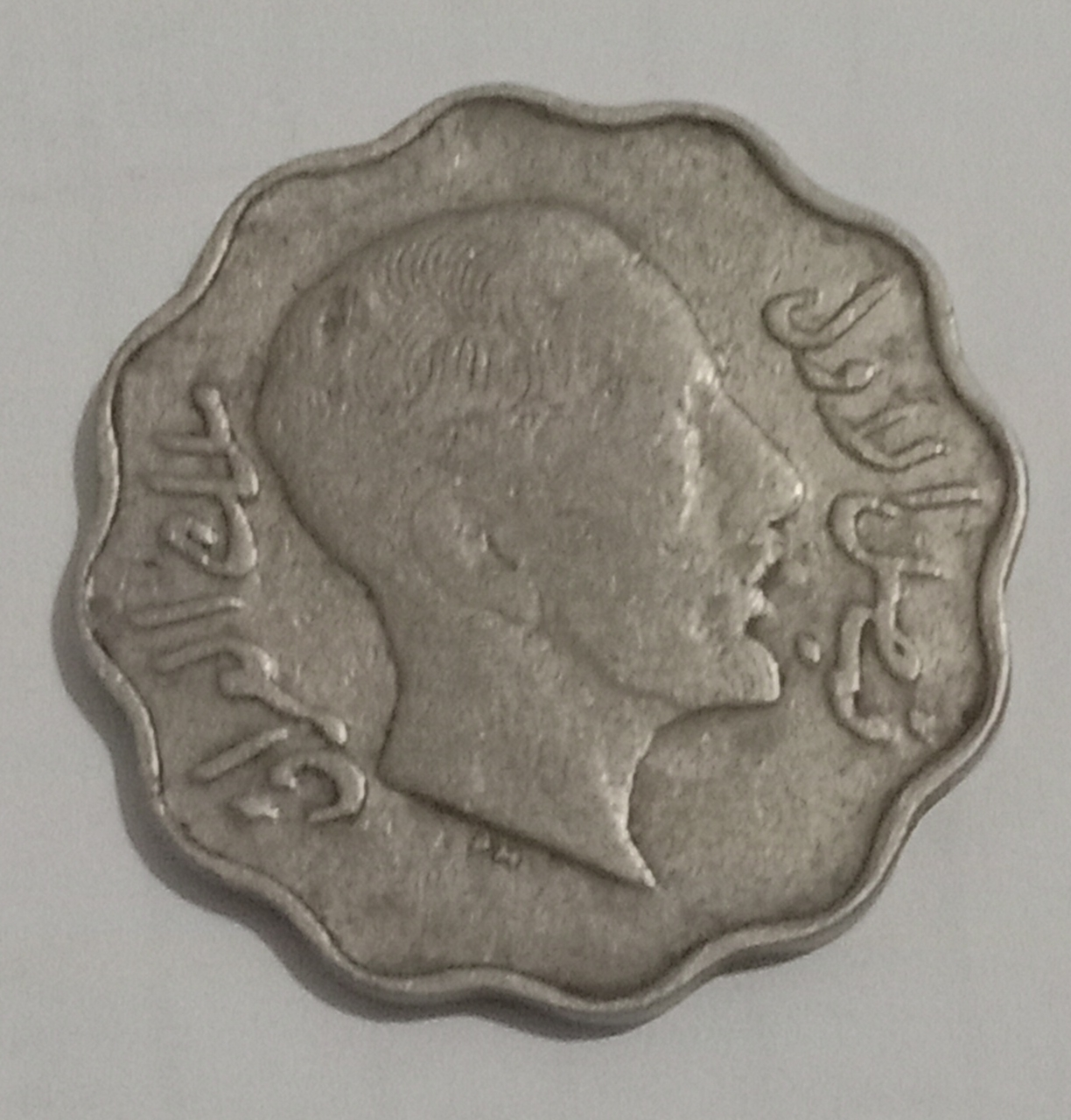
4 Fils, 1933, obverse

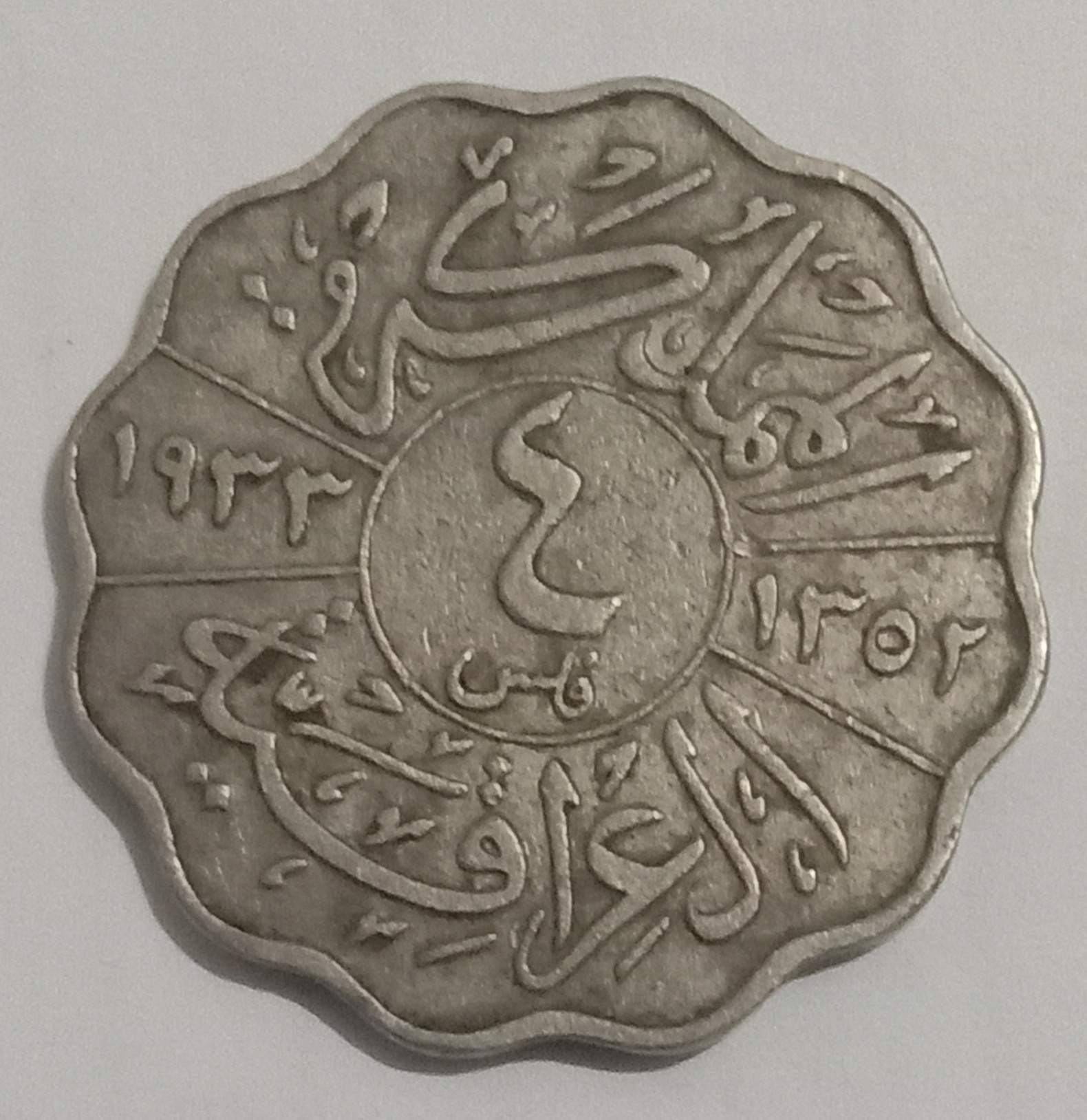
4 Fils, 1933, reverse

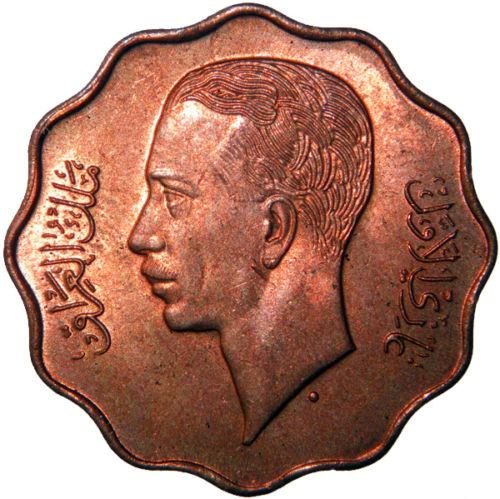
10 fils 1938, obverse

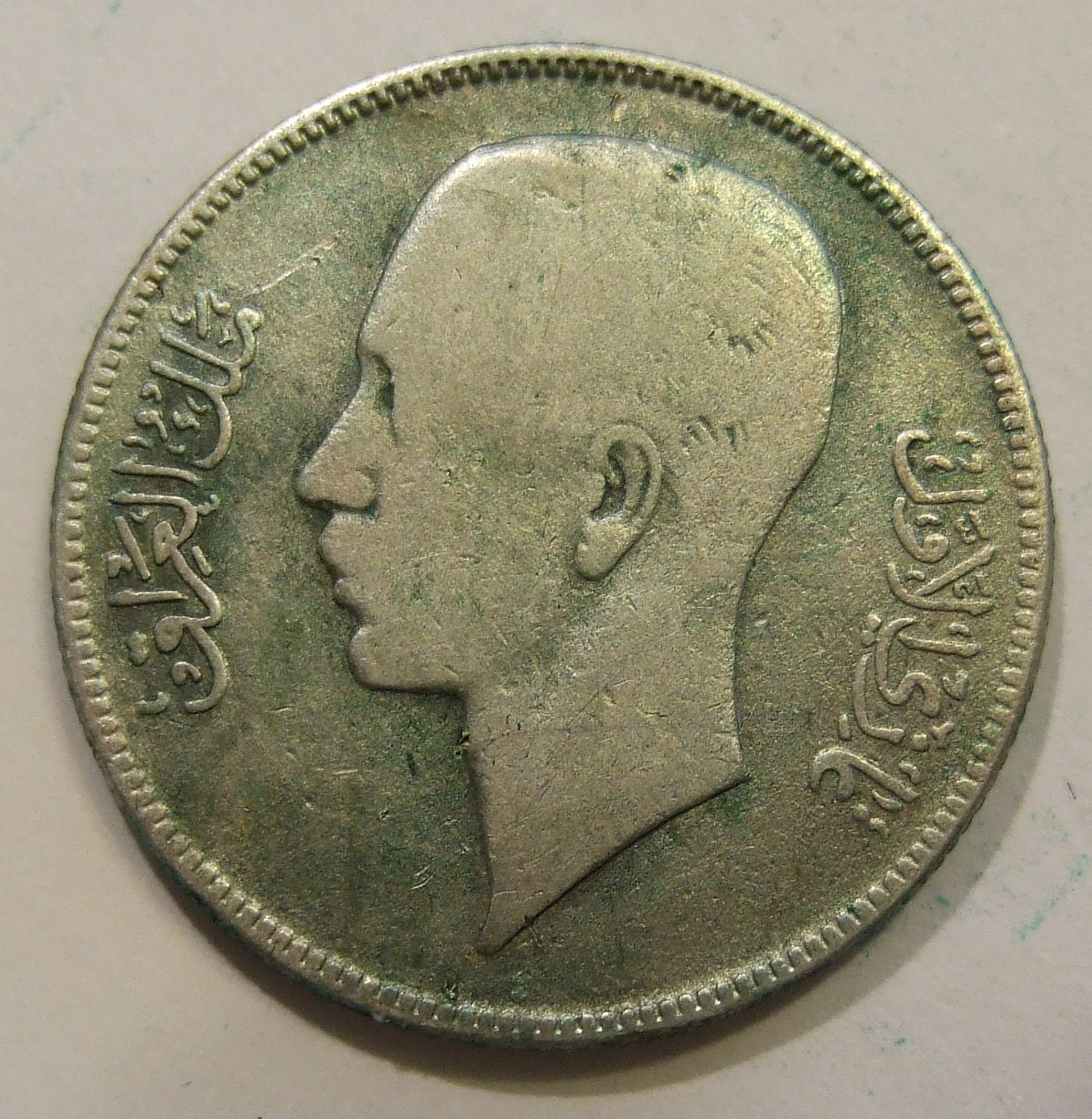
50 fils 1938, obverse

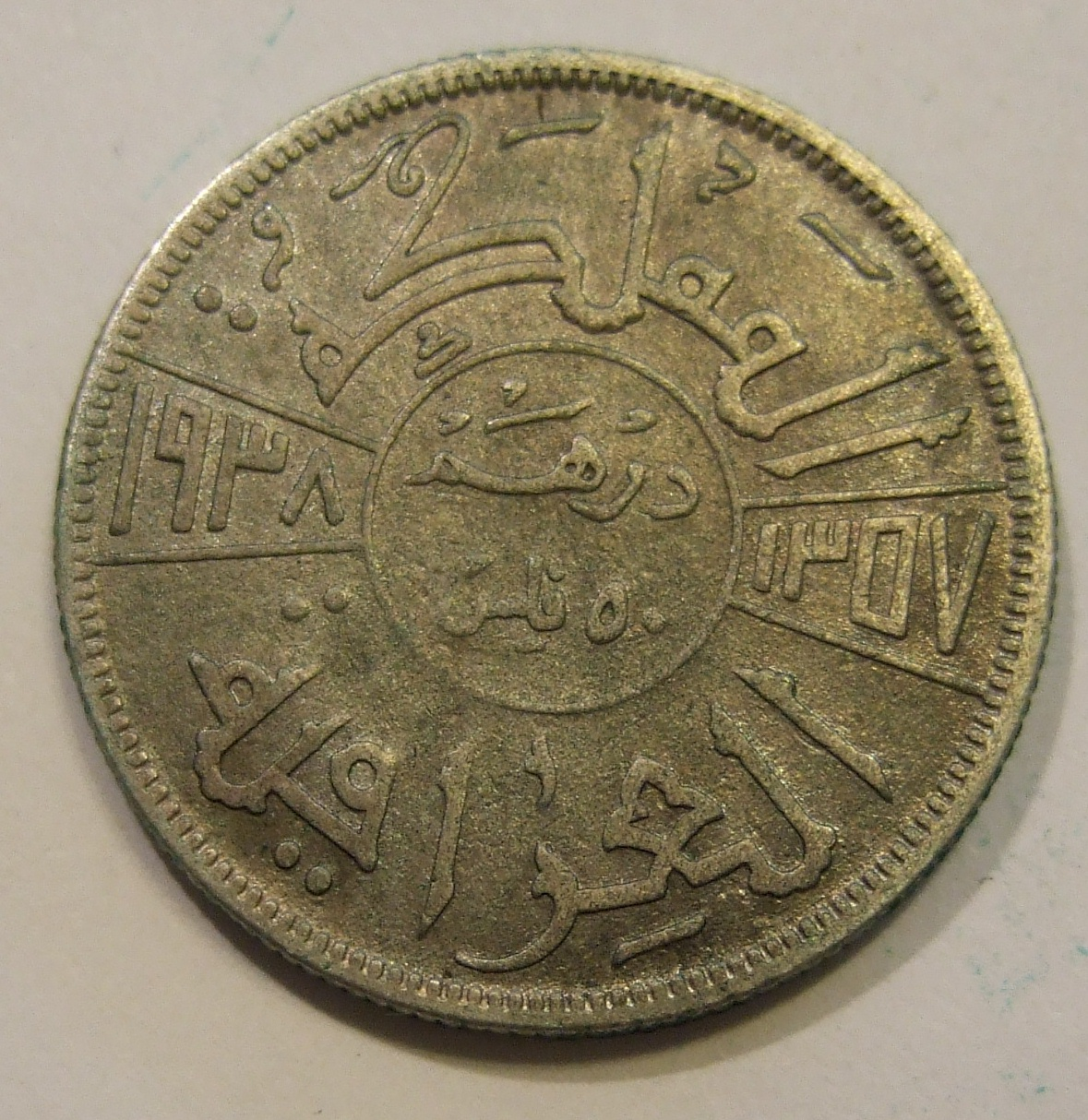
50 fils 1938, reverse

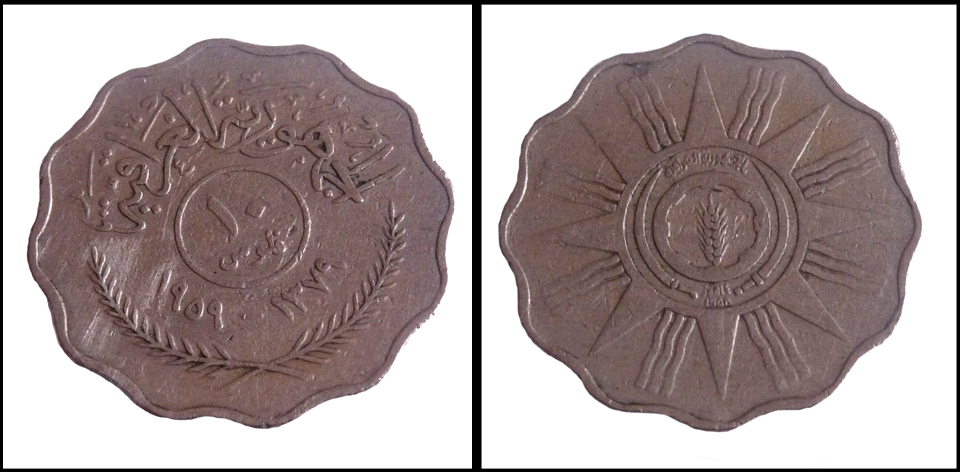
10 fils 1959

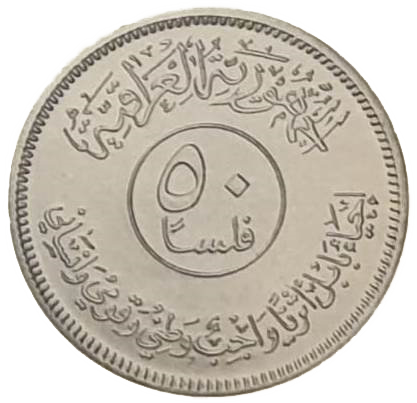
50 fils 1982, reverse

Value	Diameter	Weight	Composition	Obverse	Reverse
IQD 25	17.4 mm	2.5 g	Copper-plated steel	Inscriptions: "Central Bank of Iraq" and "25 dinars"	Outline map of Iraq with the two rivers
IQD 50	20 mm	3.4 g	Brass-plated steel	Inscriptions: "Central Bank of Iraq" and "50 dinars"	Outline map of Iraq with the two rivers
IQD 100	22 mm	4.3 g	Stainless steel	Inscriptions: "Central Bank of Iraq" and "100 dinars"	Outline map of Iraq with the two rivers

== Banknotes ==
A Ba'athist-era IQD 5 banknote depicting former Iraqi President Saddam Hussein.

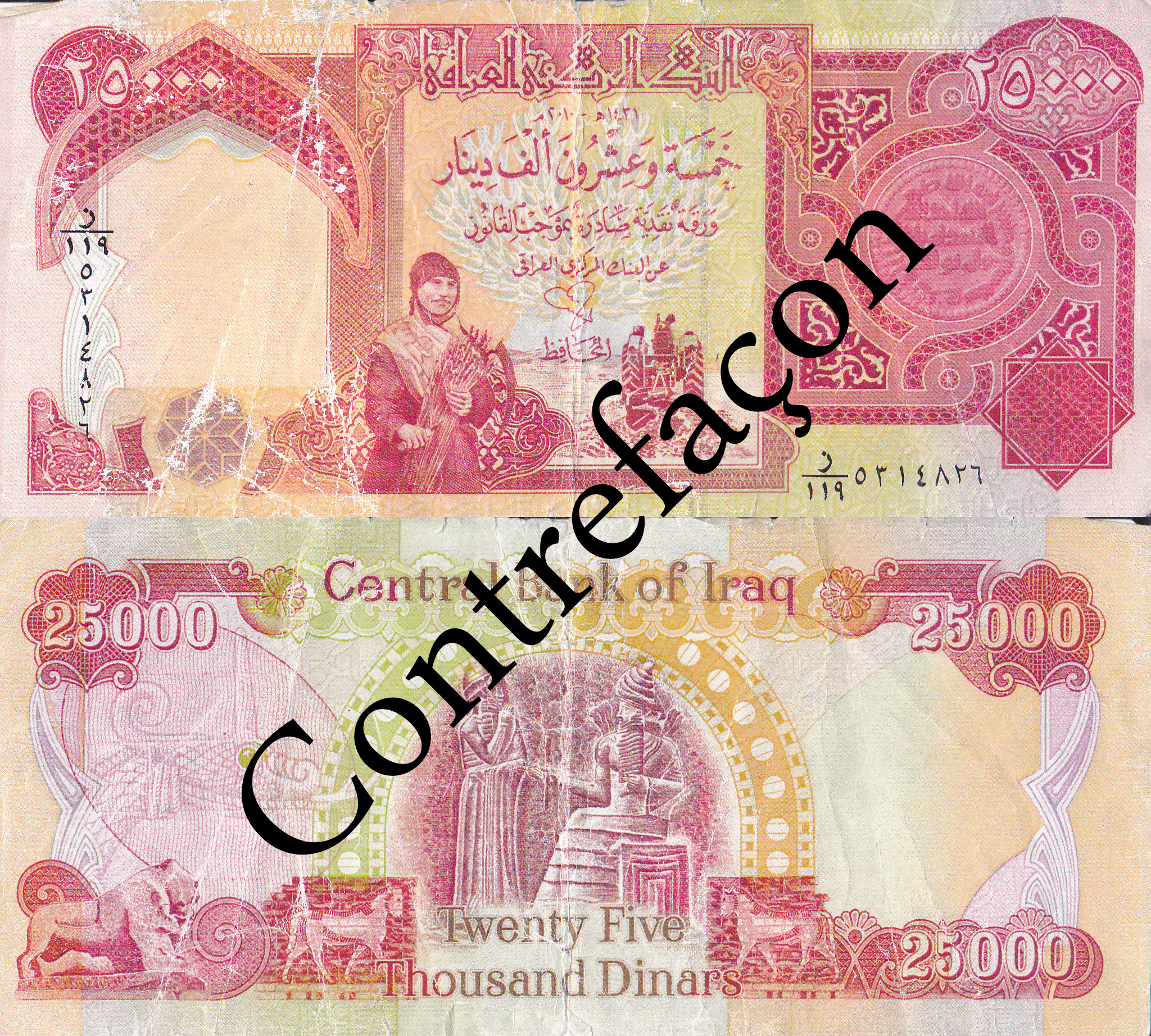
Counterfeit IQD 25,000 banknote, supposed to be of the 2010 series.

On 16 March 1932, banknotes were issued by the government in denominations of 1/4, 1/2, 1, 5, 10 and 100 dinars. The notes were printed in the United Kingdom by Bradbury, Wilkinson & Co. From 1932 to 1947, the banknotes were issued by the Iraqi currency board for the government of Iraq and banknotes were convertible into pound sterling. From 1947, the banknotes were issued by the National Bank of Iraq, then after 1954 by the Central Bank of Iraq.

100 dinars notes ceased production in the 1940s, however, the same denominations were used until 1978, when IQD 25 notes were introduced. In 1991, IQD 50 were introduced and IQD 100 reintroduced, followed in 1995 by IQD 250 notes and IQD 10,000 notes in 2002.

Banknotes that were issued between 1990 and October 2003, along with an IQD 25 note issued in 1986, bear an idealized engraving of former Iraqi President Saddam Hussein. Following the 1991 Gulf War, Iraq's currency was printed both locally and in China, using poor grade wood pulp paper (rather than cotton or linen) and inferior quality lithography (some notes were reputedly printed on presses designed for printing newspapers).

The primitive printing techniques resulted in a limitless variety in coloration and detail, one layer of the printing would be too faint while another would be too dark. Counterfeit banknotes often appeared to be of better quality than real notes. Some notes were very poorly cut, and some notes even lacked serial numbers. Despite the collapse in the value of the Iraqi dinar, the highest denomination printed until 2002 was IQD 250. In 2002, the Central Bank of Iraq issued an IQD 10,000 banknote to be used for "larger, and inter-bank transactions". This note was rarely accepted in practice due to fears of looting and counterfeiting. This forced people to carry around stacks of IQD 250 note for everyday use. The other, smaller notes were so worthless that they largely fell into disuse. This situation meant that Iraq, for the most part, had only one denomination of currency in wide circulation.

Currency printed before the Gulf War was often called the Swiss dinar, a term of obscure and uncertain origins. These notes were manufactured in England by De La Rue and were of significantly higher quality than those later produced under the economic sanctions that were imposed after the first Gulf War. After a change-over period, this currency was unendorsed by the Iraqi government. However, this old currency still circulated in Kurdish-populated parts of northern Iraq until it was replaced with the new dinar after the second Gulf War. During this time the Swiss dinar retained its value, whilst the new currency consistently lost value at sometimes 30% per annum.

In 2003, new banknotes were issued consisting of six denominations: IQD 50, IQD 250, IQD 1,000, IQD 5,000, IQD 10,000, and IQD 25,000. The notes were similar in design to notes issued by the Central Bank of Iraq (CBI) in the 1970s and 1980s. An IQD 500 note was issued a year later, in October 2004. In the Kurdistan Region, the IQD 50 note is not in circulation.

In March 2014, the CBI began replacing banknotes with anti-counterfeiting enhanced versions that include SPARK optical security features, scanner readable guarantee threads in addition to braille embossing to assist vision-impaired persons.

In February 2015, the CBI announced the removal from circulation on 30 April 2015 of the IQD 50 notes. Persons holding these banknotes were advised to immediately redeem them at their nearest bank for the IQD 250 and higher denomination dinar notes at a one-to-one rate at no charge.

In November 2015, the CBI announced the introduction of a new IQD 50,000 banknote. This is the first new denomination banknote since the new series was first issued in 2003, and also the largest ever printed by the CBI. The banknotes are printed using new security features from Giesecke & Devrient & De La Rue and measure 156 × 65 mm. They feature an outline map of Iraq showing the Euphrates and Tigris rivers as well as the Great Mosque of Samarra and the head of a purebred Arabian horse as a watermark.

In 2018, the Central Bank of Iraq (CBI) released new designs for the 25,000, 10,000, 1,000, 500, and 250 dinar notes. However, the most notable change was with the 1,000-dinar note, which was redesigned after social media users noticed that Surah Al-Ikhlas was written in the center of its front side. In the new design, the Surah was replaced by the Assyrian flag. Surah Al-Ikhlas is also written on the right side of the front of the 25,000-dinar note, and it remains in the new design.

Investing in the Iraqi dinar (IQD) represents a high-risk financial strategy that attracts speculative investors hoping for potential future currency appreciation. The investment involves purchasing Iraqi dinars with U.S. dollars, based on speculation about Iraq's potential economic recovery.

The Iraqi dinar's value is strictly controlled by the Iraqi government and does not freely float on global forex markets. This means that even if Iraq's economic conditions improve, the currency may not automatically increase in value. Investors face numerous significant challenges, including extremely limited trading volume, high transaction fees that can reach up to 20%, and widespread scams within the currency exchange market.

Financial experts consistently warn about the risks associated with dinar investments. The currency's value remains heavily dependent on Iraq's complex political landscape, ongoing economic instability, and fluctuating oil prices. Despite Iraq's substantial oil reserves, which could potentially support future economic growth, purchasing dinars is not considered a reliable investment strategy.

Alternative investment methods, such as investing directly in Iraqi stocks or companies, are generally recommended as more transparent and potentially more profitable approaches to engaging with Iraq's economic potential. The currency's fixed exchange rate and restricted trading options make it a particularly unattractive investment for international investors.

As of September 2024, one U.S. dollar remains worth approximately 1,310.6 Iraqi dinars, underscoring the currency's current limited international value and speculative nature.

=== Kingdom of Iraq dinar series (1932–1939) ===
Kingdom Dinar Series
Image		Value	Main Color	Description	
Obverse	Reverse	Value	Main Color	Obverse	Reverse
		IQD 1/4 (1932)	Green and black	King Faisal I	
		IQD 1/2 (1932)	Red and black	King Faisal I	
		IQD 1 (1932)	Black and dark brown	King Faisal I	
		IQD 1 (1939)	Green and dark brown	King Faisal II as a child	Kingdom Coat of arms with 1 dinar written inside
		IQD 5 (1932)	Red and black	King Faisal I	
		IQD 10 (1932)	Dark brown and purple	King Faisal I	
		IQD 100 (1932)	Yellow red and black	King Faisal I	
		IQD 100 (1939)	Yellow Green and black	King Faisal II as a child	

=== Swiss dinar series (1979–1986) ===
Swiss Dinar Series
Image		Value	Main Color	Description	
Obverse	Reverse	Value	Main Color	Obverse	Reverse
		IQD 1/4	Green	Grain silos at Basra	Date palms
		IQD 1/2	Brown	the Arabic astrolabe	Spiral minaret of the Great Mosque of Samarra
		IQD 1	Blue-green	A gold dinar coin	Mustansiriya Madrasah
		IQD 5	Brown-violet and deep blue	Gelî Ali Beg and its waterfall	Al-Ukhaidir Fortress
		IQD 10	Purple on blue and violet	Abu Ali Hasan Ibn al-Haitham	Al-manara al-hadba fi al-Mawsil (the hunchbacked tower of the Great Mosque of al-Nuri)
		IQD 25	Green and brown	Horses	Abbasid Palace
		IQD 25 (1986)	Brown, green and black on blue	Saddam Hussein with Battle of al-Qādisiyyah in background	Al-Shaheed Monument

=== 1990–2003 series ===
1990–2002 Series
Image		Value	Main Color	Description	
Obverse	Reverse	Value	Main Color	Obverse	Reverse
		IQD 1/4 (1993)	Green	Palm trees	Al-Bab al-wastaniy li-sur Baghdad (middle gate of the town wall of Baghdad)
		IQD 1/2 (1993)	Violet	Astrolabe	Great Mosque of Samarra
		IQD 1(1992)	Pink and green	A gold dinar coin	Mustansiriya Madrasah
		IQD 5 (1990; not issued)	Light red and pink	Saddam Hussein, buildings at Hatra, statuette of Ur-Nammu (2111 to 2094 BC), King of Ur	House (Mudhif) built by the marsh Arabs, or the Ma’dan, in southern Iraq, frieze from the Sumero-Akkadian period, eagle, found at Hatra, Sumerian weight stone ("duck weight"), golden head of a bull, decorating the front of a lyre covered with inlays
		IQD 5 (1992)	Red	Saddam Hussein	The Monument to the Unknown Soldier, King Hammurabi with the sun god Shamash
		IQD 10 (1990; not issued)	Blue	Saddam Hussein, palm trees, scene of the Tigris River	King Ashur-bani-pal galloping forward with bow and arrow, 645–635 BC
		IQD 10 (1992)	Blue-green	Saddam Hussein and Ishtar Gate	Lamassu, Assyrian carving of a winged bull
		IQD 25 (1990)	Green	Horses	Abbasid Palace
		IQD 25 (1986)	Green-brown	Saddam Hussein and Battle of Qadisiyah	Al-Shaheed Monument
		IQD 25 (2001)	Green	Saddam Hussein	Ishtar Gate / Lion of Babylon (statue)
		IQD 50 (1991)	Pink and green	Saddam Hussein	Great Mosque of Samarra
		IQD 50 (1994)	Brown and blue	Saddam Hussein and the Al-Shaheed Monument	Saddam Bridge
		IQD 100 (1991)	Green and purple	Saddam Hussein	Hands of Victory (Swords of Qādisīyah)
		IQD 100 (1994)	Blue	Saddam Hussein and the Hisn al-Ukhaydir (Al-Ukhaidir Fortress)	Baghdad Clock
		IQD 100 (2002)	Blue	Saddam Hussein	Old Baghdad
		IQD 250 (1995)	Violet	Saddam Hussein and the Qadisiya hydroelectric dam	Liberty Monument, Baghdad
		IQD 250 (2002)	Violet	Saddam Hussein	Dome of the Rock
		IQD 500 (1995; not issued)	Light pink	Saddam Hussein, Baghdad tower (previously International Saddam Tower)	Bridge of 14 July over Tigris River, Baghdad
		IQD 10,000 (2002)	Pink and violet	Saddam Hussein, The Monument to the Unknown Soldier	Mustansiriya Madrasah, Arabic astrolabe

=== 2003–present ===
2003 Series
Image		Value	Main Color	Description	
Obverse	Reverse	Value	Main Color	Obverse	Reverse
50 dinars	50 dinars	IQD 50	Purple	Grain silos at Basra	Date palms
		IQD 250	Blue	An Astrolabe	Spiral minaret of the Great Mosque of Samarra
		IQD 500	Blue-green	Dukan Dam on the Little Zab river	Lamassu, Assyrian carving of a winged bull
		IQD 1,000	Brown	A gold dinar coin	Mustansiriya Madrasah, Baghdad
		IQD 5,000	Dark blue	Gelî Ali Beg and its waterfall	Al-Ukhaidir Fortress
		IQD 10,000	Green	Abu Ali Hasan Ibn al-Haitham	Great Mosque of al-Nuri (Mosul)
		IQD 25,000	Red	An Iraqi farmer holding a sheaf of wheat, a tractor and a gold dinar coin	Carving of the Code of King Hammurabi

2013–2015 Series
Image		Value	Main Color	Description	
Obverse	Reverse	Value	Main Color	Obverse	Reverse
		IQD 10,000	Green	Sculptor Jawad Saleem's Monument of Freedom at Liberation Square (Nasb al-Hurriyah) in Baghdad	Al-manara al-hadba fi al-Mawsil (the hunchbacked tower of the Great Nurid mosque in Mosul)
		IQD 25,000	Red	An Iraqi farmer holding a jug, a tractor and a gold dinar coin	Carving of the Code of King Hammurabi
		IQD 50,000	Brown	Water wheel on the Euphrates river, palm trees, Gali Ali Beg waterfall	Fishermen, traditional reed house of the Mesopotamian marshes, rivers Euphrates and Tigris rivers on map

2018 Series
Image		Value	Main Color	Description	
Obverse	Reverse	Value	Main Color	Obverse	Reverse
		IQD 1,000	Brown	A representation of an Assyrian star, man on a boat, inscription "Enlisting the marshes and Heritage of South Iraq in the World Heritage List"	Mustansiriya Madrasah, Baghdad

== Exchange rate ==
Current IQD exchange rates
From Google Finance:	AUD CAD CHF CNY EUR GBP HKD JPY USD
From Yahoo! Finance:	AUD CAD CHF CNY EUR GBP HKD JPY USD
From XE.com:	AUD CAD CHF CNY EUR GBP HKD JPY USD
From OANDA:	AUD CAD CHF CNY EUR GBP HKD JPY USD

== See also ==
- British currency in the Middle East
- Central Bank of Iraq
- Economy of Iraq
- Iraqi art
- Iraqi Swiss dinar
- Jordanian dinar
- Kuwaiti dinar
