= Kuwait Fund for Arab Economic Development =

Governmental agency in Kuwait

- Native name: الصندوق الكويتي للتنمية الإقتصادية العربية
- Company type: Government-owned companies, State of Kuwait, Ministry of Finance
- Industry: Development, Banking
- Founded: 1961; 65 years ago
- Headquarters: Kuwait City, Kuwait
- Area served: Developing countries
- Key people: H.E. Sheikh Jarrah Jaber Al-Ahmad Al-Sabah, Chairman of the Board, Waleed S. Al-Bahar,, Acting Director General, Waleed S. Al-Bahar, Deputy Director General
- Website: www.kuwait-fund.org

The Kuwait Fund for Arab Economic Development (KFAED) (Arabic: الصندوق الكويتي للتنمية الإقتصادية العربية), commonly known as the Kuwait Fund, is the State of Kuwait’s agency for the provision and administration of financial and technical assistance to developing countries.

== History and profile ==
Founded in December 1961 by then Minister of Finance Sheikh Jaber Al-Ahmad Al-Jaber Al-Sabah, the Kuwait Fund was operational shortly after the country’s independence, ensuring that Kuwait’s newly discovered oil wealth was put to benefit neighbors and friends alike. The Fund was created as a message from the Kuwaiti people, ensuring that “Here we are embarking on the tides of change but we will not forget our friends in need”.

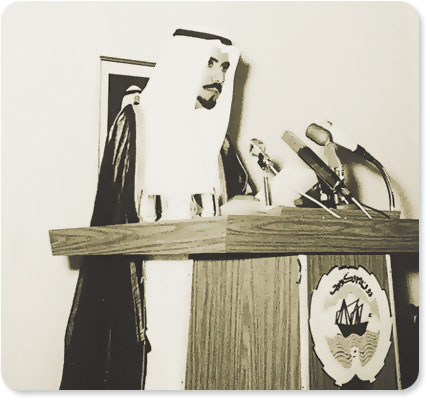
The late Sheikh Jaber Al-Ahmed Al-Jaber Al-Sabah during the opening of the Kuwait Fund for Arab Economic Development in 1961.

The Kuwait Fund is the first aid agency in the world to be established by a developing country. KFAED was originally established with a capital of KWD 50 million, increased to KWD 200 million in 1966.

"When first established in 1961, the Kuwait Fund was without precedent. Here was Kuwait, a tiny country, until recently among the poorest places in earth, establishing a development fund in the year of its political independence. While welcoming its new-found prosperity it was declaring a willingness to share its future wealth with its Arab neighbors." * -Robert McNamara, President of the World Bank (1968-1981)

Kuwait Fund is currently located in al-Murgab, Kuwait City, in two office buildings, for administration and operations, respectively. Managed as a semi-independent arm of the Kuwaiti government, the Fund maintains sovereignty over its operations, notwithstanding governmental oversight. Originally, the Prime Minister of Kuwait chaired the Fund’s Board of Directors. However, in 2003, an amendment to the law was passed, conferring control of Kuwait Fund to the Minister of Foreign Affairs.

In July 1974, the scope of the Fund’s activity was extended to the rest of the developing world (from its original mandate of solely helping countries in the Arab World) and its capital increased from KWD 200 million to KWD 1000 million.

In March 1981, Kuwait Fund’s capital was again increased, this time doubled to KWD 2000 million, with its range enlarged to include participation in the capital and resources of development institutions and in the equity capital of certain corporate entities.

Kuwait Fund headquarters in 1990, destroyed during the Iraqi invasion and occupation.

The Kuwait Fund remained operational during the 1990 Iraqi Invasion of Kuwait While the headquarters were completely ransacked, the Fund regained its operational momentum shortly after the liberation of Kuwait.

Through the Kuwait Fund, Kuwait maintains a higher foreign assistance ratio (as a percentage of the GNP) than do other rich capital surplus countries. Kuwait easily achieves and surpasses the target 0.7% of GNP that the United Nations specifies for development assistance. The State of Kuwait also maintains its support and contributions to the resources of other international development institutions, such as the Arab Fund for Economic and Social Development, the African Development Bank, the International Fund for Agricultural Development, and the International Development Association through the Kuwait Fund.

Under a new law, the Kuwait Fund is obligated to transfer up to 25% of its net annual income to the Public Authority for Housing Assistance, as a contribution of its resources.

Since 2004, the Kuwait Fund has launched the semi-annual Training Program for newly graduated Kuwaiti engineers and architects. Costing about KWD 1 million per year, the program seeks to train about 40 engineers and architects a year, by providing in-house training courses, a six-month apprenticeship in an international company abroad, and a local internship in Kuwait. The purpose of the program, as stated by the current Minister of Foreign Affairs Sheikh Mohammad Al-Sabah Al-Salem Al-Sabah, is to train and prepare Kuwaiti engineers and architects for work in the vastly expanding Kuwaiti private sector. A similar program is being held for business students at the Kuwait Investment Authority.

Since its inception, the Kuwait Fund has given a total of 1056 loans, to 120 beneficiary countries, totaling KWD 6,835,224,180 billion over 300 Grants & technical assistance packages have been distributed to 88 countries and institutions, totaling KWD 98.54 million.

According to the OECD, 2020 official development assistance from Kuwait decreased by 52% to US$394 million.

On 5 May 2021, KFAED and the United Nations Development Programme (UNDP) signed an agreement to support countries in crisis and the Sustainable Development Goals (SDGs).
