= Marmore Mena Intelligence =

Marmore MENA Intelligence
- Type: Private
- Industry: Market research & analysis
- Founded: 2010
- Headquarters: Kuwait
- Subsidiaries: Markaz
- Website: marmoremena.com/en/

Marmore Mena Intelligence is a research firm based in Chennai, India. It is a majority-owned subsidiary of Markaz, an asset management and investment banking institution that is headquartered in Kuwait. Marmore's research focuses on financial markets, economic and sector studies, and policy analyses, with a primary focus on the Middle East and North African region (MENA).

Markaz's assets under management (AUM) as of 30 September 2018 were د.ك 1.06 billion (US $3.51 billion).

Marmore's business model revolves around both syndicated research as well as customized research. Marmore's research offerings ranged from daily to yearly publications.

== Research ==
=== Infrastructure ===
Marmore's infrastructure research analyzes power, water, ports, ICT, aviation, roads and railways, and real estate. Marmore’s infrastructure research generally focuses on lighting infrastructure bottlenecks. An example is the firm's report on GCC Seaports, in which key areas requiring investments were highlighted. Marmore's report states that the total investment in Kuwait's water sector between 2005 and 2014 stood at $5.28 billion.

=== Sector and economic ===
An example of sector research from Marmore is the GCC Banking report. Marmore's GCC Healthcare report sized the growing market and provided a round-up of the key projects across the GCC.

Marmore's Economic Research encompasses thematic qualitative research. Marmore's 2015 economic research on the rollback of fuel subsidies in Kuwait estimated that the "fuel price increases may escalate costs facing the Kuwaiti construction industry by about 1% of GDP," Marmore's report on the fiscal breakeven oil price flagged the large differences in estimation that can stem from whether investment income is included or excluded in calculations.

Marmore's capital market reports cover the capital markets of MENA. The reports also provide an analysis of historical trends and future projections. Examples include the GCC M&A Report—2014, MENA Asset Management Policy Perspectives, etc. A specific example includes the GCC asset management industry study.

=== Periodic ===
The periodic reports from Marmore cover a range of research requirements. Marmore releases periodic publications on a daily, monthly, quarterly and semi-annual basis. The daily publications cover everyday developments in the stock markets. The semi-annual publications (like the GCC Market Outlook series) analyze developments over a time period.
