= Bahraini dinar =

Currency of Bahrain

دينار بحريني (Arabic)
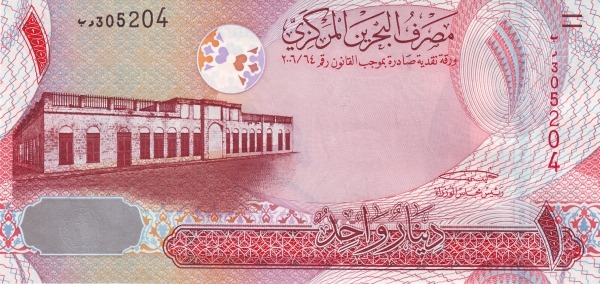

ISO 4217
- Code: BHD (numeric: 048)
- Subunit: 0.001

Units of account
- Base unit: dinar
- Plural: danānīr (Arabic)
- Symbol: .د.ب (Arabic) or BD (Latin script)
- Subunit
- 1/1000: fils
- Plural
- fils: fulūs (Arabic)

Denominations
- Banknotes
- Freq. used: BD 1/2, BD 1, BD 5, BD 10, BD 20
- Coins
- Freq. used: 5, 10, 25, 50, 100 fils
- Rarely used: 500 fils

Demographics
- Date of introduction: 1965
- User(s): Bahrain

Issuance
- Monetary authority: Central Bank of Bahrain
- Website: www.cbb.gov.bh

Valuation
- Inflation: 0.85%
- Source: The World Factbook, 2022
- Pegged with: U.S. dollar (USD) $1 USD = 0.376 BD

The dinar (Arabic: دينار بحريني, romanized: Dīnār Baḥrēnī) (sign: .د.ب or BD; code: BHD) is the currency of Bahrain. Each dinar is divided into 1000 fulūs (singular is "fils"). The Bahraini dinar is abbreviated د.ب (Arabic) or BD (Latin). It is usually represented with three decimal places denoting the fils.

The name dinar derives from the Roman denarius.

As of December 2021, the Bahraini dinar is the second highest-valued currency unit after the Kuwaiti dinar, mainly because of the country's oil prices, at 2.65 United States dollars per unit.

== History ==
The Bahraini dinar was introduced in 1965, replacing the Gulf rupee at a rate of 10 rupees = 1 dinar = 15 shillings (3/4 pound) sterling. Bahrain did not follow India's devaluation of the rupee in 1966 or sterling's devaluation in 1967. Bahraini coins and notes were introduced at that time.

Initially, Abu Dhabi adopted the Bahraini dinar but changed to the dirham in 1973, with 1 dirham = 100 fils = 0.100 dinar.

== Exchange rate ==
In December 1980, the dinar was officially pegged to the IMF's special drawing rights (SDRs). In practice, it is fixed at $1 USD = 0.376 BHD, which translates to approximately 1 BHD = US$2.65957 and, consequently, just over 9.9734 Saudi Arabian riyals. This rate was made official in 2001 via Decree (48) Article 1, and Saudi riyals are accepted at all points of sale in Bahrain at 10 to 1, with the exception of the Saudi 500 riyal note which is only accepted in major supermarkets, airports and electronic shops.

Before Malta's adoption of the euro on 1 January 2008, it was the third-highest-valued currency unit after the Kuwaiti dinar and Maltese lira. After Malta adopted the euro, the dinar became the second highest-valued currency unit.

Current BHD exchange rates
| From Google Finance: | AUD CAD CHF CNY EUR GBP HKD JPY USD |
| From Yahoo! Finance: | AUD CAD CHF CNY EUR GBP HKD JPY USD |
| From XE.com: | AUD CAD CHF CNY EUR GBP HKD JPY USD |
| From OANDA: | AUD CAD CHF CNY EUR GBP HKD JPY USD |

Note: Rates obtained from these websites may contradict with pegged rate mentioned above

== Coins ==
In 1965, coins were introduced in denominations of 1, 5, 10, 25, 50 and 100 fils. The 1, 5 and 10 fils were struck in bronze, with the others in cupro-nickel. The 1 fils coin was not produced after 1966 and no longer circulates. A bimetallic 100 fils coin was introduced in October 1992. In 1992, brass replaced bronze in the 5 and 10 fils.

A bimetallic 500 fils coin was released in 2000 with the Pearl Monument on the obverse. It was minted only until 2002 but continued to circulate. In response to the uprising in Bahrain, which resulted in the demolition of the monument on 18 March 2011, the 500 fils coin started to gradually disappear from circulation as it was no longer released back into circulation after reaching banks.

For a wider history surrounding currency in the region, see British currency in the Middle East.

=== First issue ===
First issue (1965)
| Image | Value | Diameter (mm) | Mass (g) | Composition | Edge | Obverse | Reverse | Issue |
|---|---|---|---|---|---|---|---|---|
| | 1 fils | 15 | 1.50 | Bronze | Smooth | Palm tree; Lettering (Arabic): Government of Bahrain; Year of issue (Hijri and Gregorian) | Lettering: Bahrain; value | 1965 |
| | 5 fils | 18.5 | 2.00 | Bronze | Smooth | Palm tree; Lettering (Arabic): Government of Bahrain; Year of issue (Hijri and Gregorian) | Lettering: Bahrain; value | 1965 |
| | 10 fils | 23.5 | 4.75 | Bronze | Smooth | Palm tree; Lettering (Arabic): Government of Bahrain; Year of issue (Hijri and Gregorian) | Lettering: Bahrain; value | 1965 |
| | 25 fils | 16.5 | 1.75 | Cupronickel | Reeded | Palm tree; Lettering (Arabic): Government of Bahrain; Year of issue (Hijri and Gregorian) | Lettering: Bahrain; value | 1965 |
| | 50 fils | 20 | 3.10 | Cupronickel | Reeded | Palm tree; Lettering (Arabic): Government of Bahrain; Year of issue (Hijri and Gregorian) | Lettering: Bahrain; value | 1965 |
| | 100 fils | 25 | 6.50 | Cupronickel | Reeded | Palm tree; Lettering (Arabic): Government of Bahrain; Year of issue (Hijri and Gregorian) | Lettering: Bahrain; value | 1965 |

=== Second issue ===
Second issue (1992)
| Image | Value | Diameter (mm) | Mass (g) | Composition | Edge | Obverse | Reverse | Issue |
|---|---|---|---|---|---|---|---|---|
| | 5 fils | 19 | 2.50 | Brass | Smooth | Palm tree; Lettering (English and Arabic): State of Bahrain (until 2002); Kingdom of Bahrain (from 2002); Year of issue (Hijri and Gregorian) | Value | 1992–2010 |
| | 5 fils | 19 | 2.50 | Brass-plated steel | Smooth | Palm tree; Lettering (English and Arabic): State of Bahrain (until 2002); Kingdom of Bahrain (from 2002); Year of issue (Hijri and Gregorian) | Value | 2010 |
| | 10 fils | 21 | 3.35 | Brass | Smooth | Palm tree; Lettering (English and Arabic): State of Bahrain (until 2002); Kingdom of Bahrain (from 2002); Year of issue (Hijri and Gregorian) | Value | 1992–2010 |
| | 10 fils | 21 | 3.35 | Brass-plated steel | Smooth | Palm tree; Lettering (English and Arabic): State of Bahrain (until 2002); Kingdom of Bahrain (from 2002); Year of issue (Hijri and Gregorian) | Value | 2010 |
| | 25 fils | 20 | 3.50 | Cupronickel | Reeded | Dilmun seal; Lettering (English and Arabic): State of Bahrain (until 2002); Kingdom of Bahrain (from 2002); Year of issue (Hijri and Gregorian) | Value | 1992 |
| | 50 fils | 22 | 4.50 | Cupronickel | Reeded | Dhow; Lettering (English and Arabic): State of Bahrain (until 2002); Kingdom of Bahrain (from 2002); Year of issue (Hijri and Gregorian) | Value | 1992 |
| | 100 fils | 24 | 6.00 | Inner: Cupronickel | Reeded | Coat of arms; Lettering (English and Arabic): State of Bahrain (until 2002); Kingdom of Bahrain (from 2002); Year of issue (Hijri and Gregorian) | Value | 1992 |
| | 100 fils | 24 | 6.00 | Outer: Brass | Reeded | Coat of arms; Lettering (English and Arabic): State of Bahrain (until 2002); Kingdom of Bahrain (from 2002); Year of issue (Hijri and Gregorian) | Value | 1992 |
| | 500 fils | 27 | 9.00 | Inner: Brass | Reeded | Pearl Roundabout; Lettering (English and Arabic): State of Bahrain (until 2002); Kingdom of Bahrain (from 2002); Year of issue (Hijri and Gregorian) | Value | 2000–2002 (discontinued) |
| | 500 fils | 27 | 9.00 | Outer: Cupronickel | Reeded | Pearl Roundabout; Lettering (English and Arabic): State of Bahrain (until 2002); Kingdom of Bahrain (from 2002); Year of issue (Hijri and Gregorian) | Value | 2000–2002 (discontinued) |

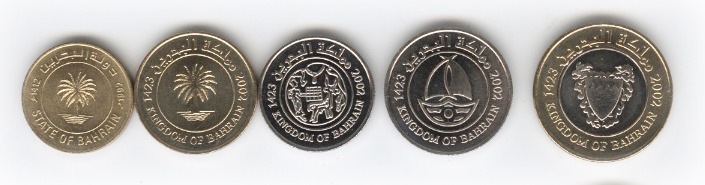
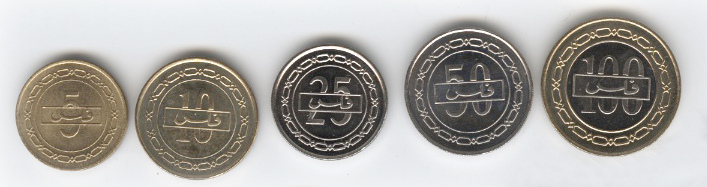
Bahrain coins, obverse and reverse

== Banknotes ==
On 16 October 1965 the Bahrain Currency Board introduced notes in denominations of 1/4, 1/2, 1, 5 and 10 dinars; a 100-fils note was introduced on September 2, 1967.

In 1973, the Bahrain Monetary Agency took over the issuance of paper money, and starting in July 1978 with a 20 dinar note, it introduced a new family of notes dated 1973 in Arabic. Denominations of 1/2, 1, 5 and 10 dinars were released on 16 December 1979. The 100-fils note of the Bahrain Currency Board was withdrawn in November 1980 and the remainder of the notes were withdrawn on 31 March 1996, remaining exchangeable until one year afterwards.

The third issue of notes (the second by the Bahrain Monetary Agency) with the same denominations of 1/2 to 20 dinars was released in March 1993. This series was upgraded during 1998 with various modifications to colour and security features. However, a fake order for banknotes had recently been placed with the Argentinian printer Ciccone Calcografica who did not verify it with the legitimate authorities in Bahrain and obtained genuine banknote paper from Arjo Wiggins to print over 7 million unauthorised replicas of the 20-dinar note (of the 1993 design), equivalent to US$365 million. These differed from genuine notes in two respects: different background shading to the Arabic name of the Bahrain Monetary Agency, and a large gap between the two Arabic letters in the horizontal serial number. These unauthorised notes were smuggled through various African and European countries by air and presented for exchange in Belgium, Switzerland and the Gulf around June 1998, just as the upgraded 20-dinar note was being released in Bahrain. The large amounts raised suspicions and were soon detected as notes that had not been printed by the authorised printer, De La Rue. The Bahrain Monetary Agency allowed individuals who had mistakenly accepted the unauthorised notes to exchange them for face value at banks between 8–14 June 1998, then quickly recalled all 20-dinar notes on 30 July 1998. The unauthorised notes, being replicas of the 1993 design, were in purple and without a hologram. Despite this the upgraded June 1998 notes, also in purple but with a hologram were also withdrawn. On 1 August 1998 a new 20-dinar note, of the same design as the upgraded note (with a hologram) but in peach colour, was released. Thus, the genuine June 1998 design was only in circulation for about 7 weeks and is therefore rarely seen by collectors. All other banknotes of the Bahrain Monetary Agency remain exchangeable.

On 7 September 2006, the Bahrain Monetary Agency was renamed the Central Bank of Bahrain. On 17 March 2008, the Central Bank of Bahrain introduced its first series of notes (Bahrain's 4th series) reflecting the country's heritage as well as its modern development.

On 4 September 2016, the Central Bank of Bahrain introduced upgraded versions of the 10- and 20-dinar notes with enhanced security features (SPARK and Motion thread) and tactile lines added at center right front for the visually impaired.

Fourth issue (2008)
| Image | | Value | Dimensions (mm) | Main colour | Description | | Date of issue |
| Obverse | Reverse | Value | Dimensions (mm) | Main colour | Obverse | Reverse | Date of issue |
|---|---|---|---|---|---|---|---|
| | | BD 1/2 | 155 × 74 | Orange | Old Bahrain Court | Bahrain International Circuit | 2008, 2017 |
| | | BD 1 | 155 × 74 | Red | Al-Hedaya Al-Khalifia School | Arabian horses; Sail Monument | 2008, 2017 |
| | | BD 5 | 155 × 74 | Blue | Shaikh Isa House; Riffa Fort | First oil well in Bahrain; Aluminium Bahrain | 2008, 2017, 2018 |
| | | BD 10 | 155 × 74 | Green | Hamad bin Isa Al Khalifa | Shaikh Isa Causeway | 2008, 2016 |
| | | BD 20 | 155 × 74 | Brown | Hamad bin Isa Al Khalifa | Al Fateh Grand Mosque | 2008, 2016 |
For table standards, see the banknote specification table.

== See also ==
- Gulf rupee
- Economy of Bahrain
- Cooperation Council for the Arab States of the Gulf
- British currency in the Middle East
