= Gulf rupee =

Former currency of British Persian Gulf protectorates

روبية خليجية (Arabic)
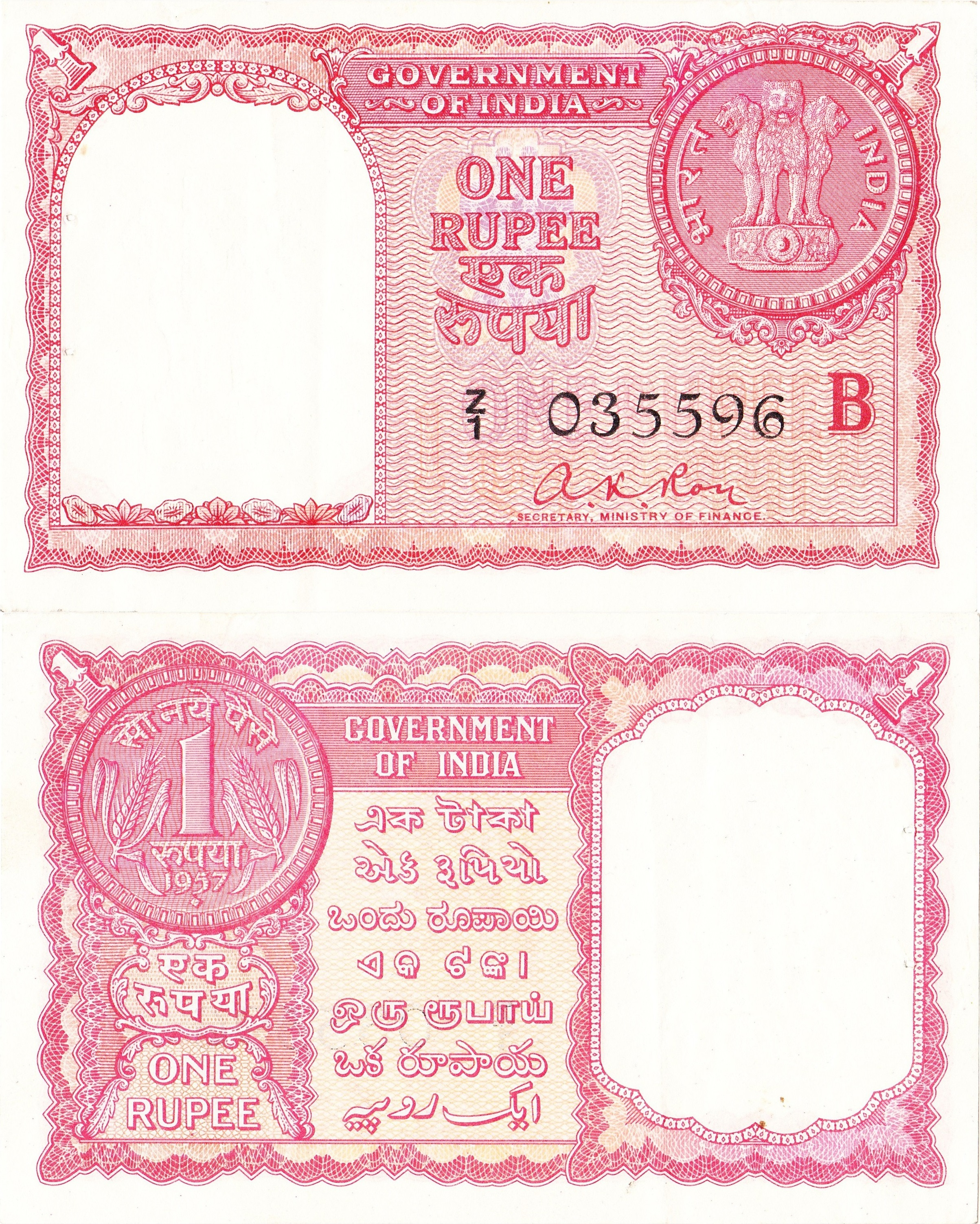
- One Gulf rupee, similar to the regular One Indian rupee note issued in India, but printed in red and containing a "Z" letter prefix in the serial number.

Denominations
- Banknotes: 1, 5, 10, 100 Gulf rupees

Demographics
- Replaced: Indian rupee ( British Raj) (Replaced the Indian rupee usage in the Gulf)
- Replaced by: Kuwaiti dinar ( Kuwait); Bahraini dinar ( Bahrain); Bahraini dinar ( United Arab Emirates; only Abu Dhabi); Qatari and Dubai riyal ( Qatar); Qatari and Dubai riyal (United Arab Emirates; only Dubai; Saudi riyal ( UAE; except Abu Dhabi); Omani rial ( Oman)
- User(s): Bahrain (Until 1965); Kuwait (Until 1961); Muscat and Oman; Qatar; Trucial States

Issuance
- Central bank: Reserve Bank of India

Valuation
- Pegged with: Indian rupee
- This infobox shows the latest status before this currency was rendered obsolete.

The Gulf rupee (Arabic: روبية خليجية, romanized: Rūbiyya Ḵalījiyya) was the official currency used in the British protectorates of the Arabian Peninsula that are around the Persian Gulf between 1959 and 1966 (1970 Oman). These areas today form the countries of Kuwait, Bahrain, Qatar, Oman, and the United Arab Emirates. It was issued by the Government of India and the Reserve Bank of India and was equivalent to the Indian rupee.

== History ==
To the middle of the 20th century, the Indian rupee was also used as the official currency in the emirates on the eastern Arabian Peninsula, namely Kuwait, Bahrain, Qatar, the Trucial States, and Oman. That meant, in effect, that the Indian rupee was the common currency in those territories as well as in India. The Indian rupee was pegged to the British pound at a rate of 13 1/3 Indian rupees = 1 pound.

The Government of India had complained of gold traffickers in the Gulf region whose base of operations was constantly being broadened, especially in Kuwait, Bahrain and Dubai. Smugglers used to take gold to the Indian sub-continent and return with Indian rupees which were valid for circulation in the region and were exchanged for more valuable foreign currencies to be used by the smugglers to buy more gold. Towards the end of the 1950s, the volume of gold trafficking had become so large that it inevitably precipitated a serious depletion in the foreign cash reserves at the Indian Reserve Bank and was causing economic damage arising directly from the smuggling operations.

As a result of the strain on India's foreign reserves, in 1959 the Indian government created the Gulf rupee, initially at par with the Indian rupee. It was introduced as a replacement for the Indian rupee for circulation exclusively outside the country. Effectively, the common currency area now did not include India.

On 6 June 1966, India devalued the rupee. Following the devaluation, several of the states still using the Gulf rupee adopted their own currencies. Kuwait had adopted the Kuwaiti dinar in 1961, pegged to the Indian rupee, which was still pegged to the pound sterling. Bahrain created the Bahraini dinar in 1965, at the rate of 1 dinar = 10 rupees. Qatar and most of the Trucial States (after 1971, United Arab Emirates) adopted the Qatar and Dubai riyal, which was equal to the Gulf rupee prior to its devaluation. Abu Dhabi used the Bahraini dinar until 1973. Oman continued to use the Gulf rupee until 1970, with the government backing the currency at its old peg to the pound, when it adopted the Omani rial.

== Banknotes ==
Notes were issued in denominations of INR 1 by the Indian government and INR 5, INR 10 and INR 100 by the Reserve Bank of India. The notes were in designs very similar to the standard Indian notes but were printed in different colours. While the INR 1 and INR 10 notes were printed in red, the INR 5 notes were printed in orange and the INR 100 notes were printed in green. The serial numbers of the banknotes issued in all denominations were prefixed by a Z.

== See also ==
- British currency in the Middle East

Preceded by: Indian rupee Reason: creation of new currency for use outside of India; Ratio: at par	Currency of Kuwait; 1959 – 1961	Succeeded by: Kuwaiti dinar Ratio: 1 dinar = 13 1/3 rupees = 1 pound sterling
Preceded by: Indian rupee Reason: creation of new currency for use outside of India; Ratio: at par	Currency of Bahrain; 1959 – 1965	Succeeded by: Bahraini dinar Ratio: 1 dinar = 10 rupees = 3/4 pound sterling = 15 shillings sterling
Preceded by: Indian rupee Reason: creation of new currency for use outside of India; Ratio: at par	Currency of Qatar; 1959 – 1966	Succeeded by: Saudi riyal Location: Qatar and Trucial States except Abu Dhabi; Reason: devaluation of the Gulf rupee before delivery of replacement Ratio: 1 riyal = 1.065 rupee
Preceded by: Indian rupee Reason: creation of new currency for use outside of India; Ratio: at par	Currency of Trucial States; 1959 – 1966	Succeeded by: Saudi riyal Location: Qatar and Trucial States except Abu Dhabi; Reason: devaluation of the Gulf rupee before delivery of replacement Ratio: 1 riyal = 1.065 rupee
Preceded by: Indian rupee Reason: creation of new currency for use outside of India; Ratio: at par	Currency of Trucial States; 1959 – 1966	Succeeded by: Bahraini dinar Location: Abu Dhabi; Reason: devaluation of the Gulf rupee before delivery of replacement Ratio: 1 dinar = 10 rupees = 3/4 pound sterling = 15 shillings sterling
Preceded by: Indian rupee Reason: creation of new currency for use outside of India; Ratio: at par	Currency of Muscat and Oman; 1959 – 1970; Concurrent with: Maria Theresa thaler, Bahraini dinar, Kuwaiti dinar, Dhofar baiza, Muscat baiza, and Oman baiza Note: the Gulf rupee circulated primarily near the coast (Muscat)	Succeeded by: Omani rial Ratio: 1 rial = 13 1/3 rupees = 1 pound sterling
