= Iraqi Swiss dinar =

Former currency of Iraq

دينار سويسري (Arabic)

Denominations
- Banknotes: 1/4, 1/2, 1, 5, 10, 25 dinars (Iraqi dinar banknotes issued before the beginning of the Gulf War and Iraqi dinar banknotes bearing the image of former Iraqi leader Saddam Hussein)

Demographics
- User(s): Iraq; Kuwait (1990-1991)

Issuance
- Central bank: Central Bank of Iraq
- This infobox shows the latest status before this currency was rendered obsolete.

The Swiss dinar (Arabic: دينار سويسري) was the Iraqi currency in circulation prior to the 1990 Gulf War.

== Name ==
While the reason for the adjective "Swiss" is unknown, two possible explanations have been offered.

It has been claimed the printing plates for the currency came from Switzerland, although the notes were actually produced in the United Kingdom by De La Rue. While this claim is widespread, the actual origins of the plates are unknown as no sources close to De La Rue or the Central Bank of Iraq have made any comment on the matter.

The second possible explanation is that prior to the Gulf War, Iraq was historically a low inflation country, similar to Switzerland.

== History ==
=== Inter-war period ===
After the Gulf War, the Iraqi government disendorsed the old currency, favoring newly printed Saddam dinars, and the Swiss dinar ceased to be legal tender. However, the old currency still circulated in the politically isolated Kurdistan region of Iraq. The government of the Kurdistan region did not have the printing plates of the Swiss dinar, but it also refused to accept lower-quality Saddam dinar banknotes (which were issued in huge amounts). Since the supply of Saddam dinar banknotes increased while the supply of Swiss dinar banknotes remained stable (even decreased because of notes taken out of circulation), the Swiss dinar appreciated against the Saddam dinar. By having its own stable currency, the Kurdistan Region of Iraq effectively evaded inflation, which ran rampant throughout the rest of the country.

=== Post-war ===
Following the 2003 invasion the Coalition Provisional Authority, installed by the Coalition Forces, determined that Iraq needed a new, unified currency, but establishing a proper exchange rate was relatively difficult. The market exchange rate for Saddam dinars to Swiss dinars remained around 100:1 from 1998 to January 2002, but as the invasion ensued, the Kurdish currency appreciated to 300:1, and subsequently fell to 250:1. After further investigation, the Coalition Provisional Authority determined that it would be best to equate the two currencies by purchasing power parity, which was around 100:1. After researching further, the Coalition decided to adopt an official rate between the market rate and the PPP rate, officially pegging the currency at 150 Saddam dinars per Swiss dinar.

There were two proposed methods to unify the currencies. The first would be to print a new set of Swiss dinar notes and distribute them among the south. However, this would result in 80% of the population needing to exchange the Saddam dinar notes for Swiss dinars. Since printing more Saddam dinar notes was not politically favored, after consulting with a currency expert, the Coalition decided to alter the Swiss dinar plates to the Saddam dinar denominations. This would allow the least amount of currency exchange, but also take Saddam's image off the currency. The new Swiss currency was created in a different color to differentiate from the old currency.

Reportedly, the exchange was relatively swift and without incident, with the exception of two failed attacks on currency convoys.
