= Emblem of Kuwait =

- Current emblem of State of Kuwait (2024)
- Armiger: Emir of Kuwait
- Adopted: 1962
- Shield: Tierced per pale gules, argent, and vert, surmounted by a trapezium sable issuant from chief
- Supporters: The Hawk of Quraish
- Motto: دولة الكويت (State of Kuwait)

The Emblem of Kuwait (شعار الكويت) was adopted in 1962 and it consists of the shield of the flag design in color superimposed on a golden falcon (Hawk of Quraish) with wings displayed. The falcon supports a disk containing a boom sailing ship, a type of dhow, with the full name of the state written in Arabic at the top of the disk.

The State of Kuwait gained its independence in 1961. Shortly after, the council of ministers tasked the Ministry of Information with creating an emblem symbolizing Kuwait’s past, present, and future. In 1962, Mohammed Husni Zaki designed the emblem that is now recognized as the official emblem of the State of Kuwait.

This a symbol of the maritime tradition of the country and is also found in the national coat of arms of Qatar (until 2008, also in the UAE coat of arms). The falcon is a symbol of the Banu Quraish line, to which the Islamic prophet Muhammad belonged and is likewise found in many coats of arms of the Arabian Peninsula.

The coat of arms replaced an older emblem with a falcon and two crossed flags.

== Historical emblems ==
Emblem of Kuwait (1921–1940)

Emblem of Kuwait (1940–1956)

Emblem of Kuwait (1956–1962)

Emblem of Kuwait (1962–2024)

Emblem of Kuwait (2024–present)

== See also ==
- Flag of Kuwait
