= Kuwaiti dinar =

Currency of Kuwait

دينار كويتي (Arabic)

ISO 4217
- Code: KWD (numeric: 414)
- Subunit: 0.001

Units of account
- Base unit: dinar
- Plural: danānīr (Arabic)
- Symbol: KD, or د.ك (Arabic)
- Subunit
- 1/1,000: fils
- Plural
- fils: fulūs (Arabic)

Denominations
- Banknotes
- Freq. used: KD 1/4, KD 1/2, KD 1, KD 5, KD 10, KD 20
- Coins
- Freq. used: 5, 10, 20, 50, 100 fulūs
- Rarely used: 1 fils

Demographics
- Date of introduction: 1961
- Replaced: Gulf rupee
- User(s): Kuwait

Issuance
- Central bank: Kuwait Currency Board (1961–1969); Central Bank of Kuwait (since 1969)
- Website: www.cbk.gov.kw

Valuation
- Inflation: 1.50%
- Source: The World Factbook, 2017 est.
- Pegged with: Undisclosed currency basket

The Kuwaiti dinar (Arabic: دينار كويتي; currency symbol: KD, or د.ك in Arabic; currency code: KWD) is the currency of Kuwait. Each dinar is sub-divided into 1,000 fils. The dinar was introduced in 1961 to replace the Gulf rupee.

As of 2026, the Kuwaiti dinar is the currency with the highest value per base unit, with KD 1 equalling US$3.23 or GBP£2.40, ahead of the Bahraini dinar, which equals US$2.66.

== History ==
The dinar was introduced in 1961 to replace the Gulf rupee, equal to the Indian rupee. It was initially equivalent to £1 sterling (GBP). As the rupee was fixed at 1s.6d., that resulted in a conversion rate of Rs. 13 1/3 to KD 1.

When Iraq invaded Kuwait in 1990, the Iraqi dinar replaced the Kuwaiti dinar as the currency and large quantities of banknotes were stolen by the invading forces. After liberation, the Kuwaiti dinar was restored as the country's currency and a new series of banknotes was introduced to replace the previous notes, including the ones that were stolen.

== Coins ==
The coins in the following table were introduced in 1961. The design of all coins is similar and has not changed since they were first minted. On the obverse is a boom ship, with year of minting in both Islamic and Common Era in Arabic. The reverse contains the value in Arabic within a central circle with الكُوَيت (transl. Al-Kuwait) above and KUWAIT in English below.

Unlike many other Middle Eastern currencies, Kuwait has a coin worth 0.02 of its main currency unit rather than 0.025 or 0.25 – though this latter does exist as a banknote (see below).

Current issue (1961)
Image		Value	Diameter (mm)	Thickness (mm)	Mass (g)	Composition	Edge	Obverse	Reverse	Issue	Withdrawn
Obverse	Reverse	Value	Diameter (mm)	Thickness (mm)	Mass (g)	Composition	Edge	Obverse	Reverse	Issue	Withdrawn
		1 fils	17	1.2	2	Nickel-brass	Smooth	Boum dhow; Year of issue in Hijri and Gregorian	Lettering: Kuwait in English and Arabic; denomination in Arabic	1961–1988	2014
		5 fils	19.5	1.2	2.5	Nickel-brass	Smooth	Boum dhow; Year of issue in Hijri and Gregorian	Lettering: Kuwait in English and Arabic; denomination in Arabic	1961–2011	Current
		5 fils	19.5	1.45	2.55	Brass-plated steel	Smooth	Boum dhow; Year of issue in Hijri and Gregorian	Lettering: Kuwait in English and Arabic; denomination in Arabic	2012	Current
		10 fils	21	1.5	3.75	Nickel-brass	Smooth	Boum dhow; Year of issue in Hijri and Gregorian	Lettering: Kuwait in English and Arabic; denomination in Arabic	1961–2011	Current
		10 fils	21	1.5	4	Brass-plated steel	Smooth	Boum dhow; Year of issue in Hijri and Gregorian	Lettering: Kuwait in English and Arabic; denomination in Arabic	2012	Current
		20 fils	20	1.36	3	Cupronickel	Reeded	Boum dhow; Year of issue in Hijri and Gregorian	Lettering: Kuwait in English and Arabic; denomination in Arabic	1961–2011	Current
		20 fils	20	1.36	3	Stainless steel	Reeded	Boum dhow; Year of issue in Hijri and Gregorian	Lettering: Kuwait in English and Arabic; denomination in Arabic	2012	Current
		50 fils	23	1.54	4.5	Cupronickel	Reeded	Boum dhow; Year of issue in Hijri and Gregorian	Lettering: Kuwait in English and Arabic; denomination in Arabic	1961–2011	Current
		50 fils	23	1.7	4.5	Stainless steel	Reeded	Boum dhow; Year of issue in Hijri and Gregorian	Lettering: Kuwait in English and Arabic; denomination in Arabic	2012	Current
		100 fils	26	1.71	6.5	Cupronickel	Reeded	Boum dhow; Year of issue in Hijri and Gregorian	Lettering: Kuwait in English and Arabic; denomination in Arabic	1961–2011	Current
		100 fils	26	1.8	6.7	Stainless steel	Reeded	Boum dhow; Year of issue in Hijri and Gregorian	Lettering: Kuwait in English and Arabic; denomination in Arabic	2012	Current

== Banknotes ==
Six series of the Kuwaiti dinar banknote have been printed.

=== First series ===
The first series was issued following the pronouncement of the Kuwaiti Currency Law in 1960, which established the Kuwaiti Currency Board. This series was in circulation from 1 April 1961 to 1 February 1982 and consisted of denominations of KD 1/4, KD 1/2, KD 1, KD 5 and KD 10.

=== Second series ===
After the creation of the Central Bank of Kuwait in 1969 as a replacement to the Kuwaiti Currency Board, new KD 1/4, KD 1/2 and KD 10 notes were issued from 17 November 1970, followed by the new KD 1 and KD 5 notes of the second series on 20 April 1971. This second series was withdrawn on 1 February 1982.

=== Third series ===
The third series was issued on 20 February 1980, after the accession to the throne of late Emir Jaber Al-Ahmad Al-Sabah, in denominations of KD 1/4, KD 1/2, 1, 5 and KD 10. A KD 20 banknote was introduced later on 9 February 1986. As a result of the state of emergency after the Invasion of Kuwait, this series was ruled invalid with effect from 30 September 1991. Significant quantities of these notes were stolen by Iraqi forces and some had appeared on the international numismatic market. The "Standard Catalog of World Paper Money" (A. Pick, Krause Publications) lists notes with the following serial number prefix denominators as being among those stolen:

Denomination	Prefix Denominators
KD 1/4 (د.ك١/٤)	54–86
KD 1/2 (د.ك١/٢)	30–37
KD 1 (١د.ك)	47–53
KD 5 (٥د.ك)	18–20
KD 10 (١٠د.ك)	70–87
KD 20 (٢٠د.ك)	9–13

=== Fourth series ===
After the liberation, a fourth series was issued on 24 March 1991 with the aims of replacing the previous withdrawn series as quickly as possible and guaranteeing the country's swift economic recovery. This fourth series was legal tender until 16 February 1995. Denominations were KD 1/4, KD 1/2, KD 1, KD 5, KD 10 and KD 20.

=== Fifth series ===
The fifth series of Kuwaiti banknotes was in use from 3 April 1994 and included high-tech security measures which have now become standard for banknotes. It was withdrawn on 1 October 2015. Denominations were as in the fourth series.

Fifth series (1994)
Value	Dimensions	Main colour	Description		Date of		
Value	Dimensions	Main colour	Obverse	Reverse	issue	withdrawal	lapse
KD 1/4	110 × 68 mm	Brown	Coat of arms; Al-Mouhaleb dhow and chest	Young girls playing traditional game	3 Apr 1994	1 Oct 2015	18 Apr 2025
KD 1/2	120 × 68 mm	Green	Coat of arms; Money changers' stalls and coffee pot	Young boys playing traditional game with marbles	3 Apr 1994	1 Oct 2015	18 Apr 2025
KD 1	130 × 68 mm	Blue	Coat of arms; Kuwait Towers and oil lamp	Shuwaikh Port and water storage vessel on stand	3 Apr 1994	1 Oct 2015	18 Apr 2025
KD 5	140 × 68 mm	Red	Coat of arms; Liberation Tower and grinding stone	Oil refinery and Az-Zour power station; water tanks and electricity pylons	3 Apr 1994	1 Oct 2015	18 Apr 2025
KD 10	150 × 68 mm	Maroon	Coat of arms; Grand Mosque and water vessel	Pearl diving and dhow; traditional Kuwaiti door and incense burner	3 Apr 1994	1 Oct 2015	18 Apr 2025
KD 20	160 × 68 mm	Khaki	Coat of arms; Red Fort and cannon	Central bank building and Al Shamiya Gate	3 Apr 1994	1 Oct 2015	18 Apr 2025
For table standards, see the banknote specification table.

=== Sixth series ===
Central Bank of Kuwait brought the sixth series of Kuwaiti banknotes into circulation on 29 June 2014: the notes have tactile marks, so that the visually impaired can identify them by touch.

Sixth series (2014)
Value	Dimensions	Main colour	Description		Date of issue
Value	Dimensions	Main colour	Obverse	Reverse	Date of issue
KD 1/4	110 × 68 mm	Brown	Liberation Tower; Tishala dhow	Traditional wooden Kuwaiti door and first Kuwaiti coin	29 June 2014
KD 1/2	120 × 68 mm	Green	Kuwait Towers, Shu'i dhow	Hawksbill sea turtle and silver pomfret	29 June 2014
KD 1	130 × 68 mm	Grey	Grand Mosque, Jalbut dhow	Ionic capital, Failaka Island	29 June 2014
KD 5	140 × 68 mm	Purple	Central bank building, Batil dhow	Oil refinery and tanker	29 June 2014
KD 10	150 × 68 mm	Red	National Assembly, Sambuk dhow	Falcon and camel	29 June 2014
KD 20	160 × 68 mm	Blue	Seif Palace, Boum dhow	Boum and a pearl diver	29 June 2014
For table standards, see the banknote specification table.

=== Commemorative issues ===
In both 1993 and 2001, the Central Bank of Kuwait issued commemorative KD 1 polymer banknotes to celebrate its Liberation from Iraq. The first commemorative note, dated 26 February 1993, was issued to celebrate the second anniversary of its Liberation. The front features the map of the State of Kuwait, the emblem of Kuwait and on the left and right side of the note is the list of nations that assisted in its Liberation, in both English and Arabic. The second commemorative note, dated 26 February 2001, was issued to celebrate the tenth anniversary of its Liberation. One feature from the note is an optically variable device (OVD) patch that shows a fingerprint, a reference to the victims of the invasion and occupation of Kuwait. Even though they were denominated as KD 1, both of the commemorative notes state that they were not legal tender.

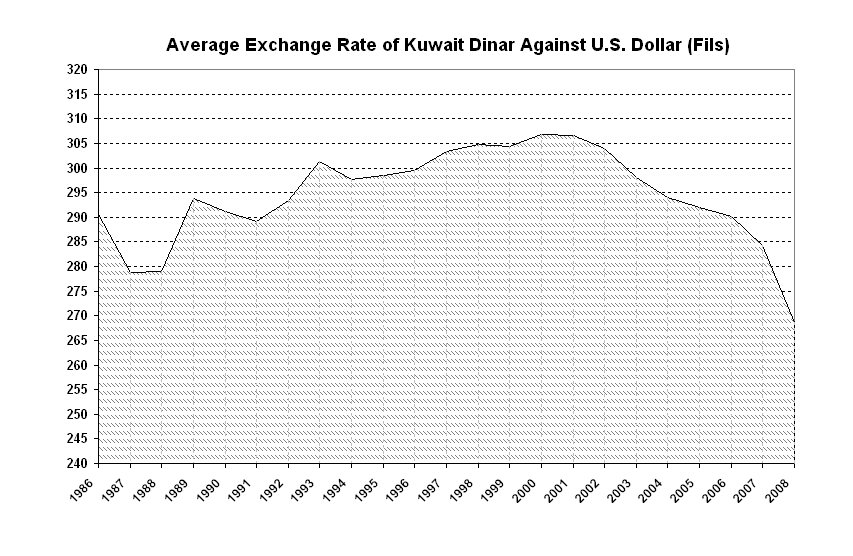
Average exchange rate of Kuwaiti dinar against US dollar (fils)

From 18 March 1975 to 4 January 2003, the dinar was pegged to a weighted currency basket. From 5 January 2003 until 20 May 2007, the pegging was switched to US$1 = KD 0.29963 with margins of ±3.5%. The central rate translates to approximately KD 1 = US$3.53.

From 16 June 2007, the Kuwaiti dinar was re-pegged to a basket of currencies, and was worth about $3.28 as of December 2016. It is the world's highest-valued currency unit.

Current KWD exchange rates
From Google Finance:	AUD CAD CHF CNY EUR GBP HKD JPY USD
From Yahoo! Finance:	AUD CAD CHF CNY EUR GBP HKD JPY USD
From XE.com:	AUD CAD CHF CNY EUR GBP HKD JPY USD
From OANDA:	AUD CAD CHF CNY EUR GBP HKD JPY USD

== See also ==
- Kuwait
- Economy of Kuwait
- Jordanian dinar
- Iraqi dinar

Preceded by: Gulf rupee Ratio: 1 dinar = 13 1/3 rupees = 1 pound sterling	Currency of Kuwait (pre-war); 1961 – August 2, 1990	Succeeded by: Iraqi dinar Reason: Iraqi invasion of Kuwait
Preceded by: Iraqi dinar Reason: liberation of Kuwait; Ratio: = pre-war Kuwaiti dinar	Currency of Kuwait (post-war) early 1991 –	Succeeded by: Current
