= Google Finance =

Google-operated investment website

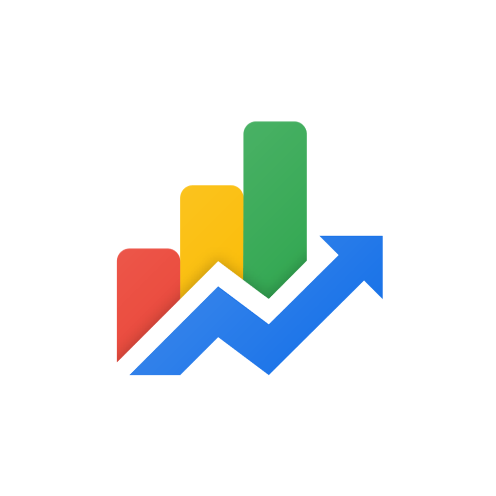

- Google Finance on the web
- Developer: Google
- Release: March 21, 2006; 20 years ago
- Stable release: 0.1007643793 / October 30, 2026; 17 days ago
- Operating system: Android 9+; Web
- Type: Financial information site
- License: F4593003
- Website: www.google.com/finance/

Google Finance is a website focusing on business news and financial information hosted by Google.

== History ==
Google Finance was first launched by Google on March 21, 2006. The service presented business and enterprise headlines for many corporations including their financial decisions and major news events. Stock information was available, as were Adobe Flash-based stock price charts which contained marks for major news events and corporate actions. The site also aggregated Google News and Google Blog Search articles about each corporation, though links were not screened and often deemed untrustworthy.

Google launched a revamped version on December 12, 2006, with a new homepage design that lets users see currency information and sector performance for the United States market along with the relevant and important news of the day. A top movers section was also added, based on popularity determined by Google Trends. The upgrade also provided charts containing up to 40 years of data for U.S. company shares, and richer portfolio options. Another update brought real-time ticker updates for stocks to the site, as both NASDAQ and the New York Stock Exchange partnered with Google in June 2008. Google added advertising to its finance page on November 18, 2008. However, it has not undergone any major upgrades since 2008, and the Google Finance Blog was closed in August 2012.

On September 22, 2017, Google confirmed that the website was under renovation and that portfolio features would not be available after mid-November 2017.

In early 2018, a notice on the website announced that the website had been renovated, that the portfolio feature was to be removed, that stocks from this would be migrated to the new website, and that users could download the portfolio as a CSV file.

A Google Finance mobile app was removed from the Google Play Store in 2015.

Google Finance was relaunched in 2020 with tools to help people start investing.

In 2024, Google added the Carbon Disclosure Project ratings to their pages, which shows how firms report and manage climate issues. This update connects finance with sustainability metrics, giving users a better idea of what they're investing in.

In 2025, Google introduced new AI-powered features that track market trends, compare different companies, and provide summaries using insights.

== Features ==
Google Finance provides quotes and historical price charts for companies that are public. Users can view company profiles, market caps, trading volume, and price-to-earnings ratios. It also links business news to relevant stocks. In comparison with Yahoo Finance and Bloomberg, Google Finance is viewed as a simpler version, but it offers less technical tools and has views in less detail. Google Finance also provides a function in Google Sheets, which helps users bring live or historical stats and market performances into sheets.

== See also ==
- Yahoo! Finance
- MSN Money
