= Yahoo Finance =

Media property and part of the Yahoo network

- Website type: News & finance
- Headquarters: New York City
- Owner: Yahoo Inc.
- Creator: Yahoo
- Key people: Tapan Bhat (President and General Manager)
- Website: finance.yahoo.com
- IPv6 support: Yes
- Registration: Optional
- Launched: January 19, 1997; 29 years ago
- Current status: Active

Yahoo Finance is a media property that is part of the Yahoo network. It provides financial news, data and commentary including stock quotes, press releases, financial reports, and original content. It also offers online tools for personal finance management, including portfolio tracking, interactive charts, and stock screening. In addition to posting paid partner content from other web sites, it posts original stories by its team of staff journalists. Comscore ranked Yahoo Finance as the number 1 most popular financial news and research site in 2008, a ranking it has continued to maintain as of May 2024. As of April 2024, the site had approximately 150 million monthly active users.

In 2017, Yahoo Finance added the feature to look at news surrounding cryptocurrency.

Yahoo Finance video programs have been made available via connected TVs and devices, including Apple TV, Samsung TV Plus, YouTube, Amazon Freevee, and DirecTV.

== History ==
In 2001, Yahoo Finance launched a subscription service providing access to real-time stock quotes; quotes on the free service were provided on a 20-minute delay. The site stopped using ticker information from Reuters in favor of direct feeds from major U.S. exchanges in 2005. A 2006 redesign introduced interactive charts to the site, and it began offering free real-time stock quotes in 2008. In 2012, Yahoo Finance began a content-sharing partnership with CNBC, following a similar partnership with ABC News the previous year. In February 2016, Comscore reported that Yahoo Finance had 78 million monthly active users.

Yahoo Finance began providing live video content in 2017 and added more video programming in 2018. Apollo Global Management acquired Yahoo in 2021, stating an aim to grow the Yahoo Finance business. In August 2023, Yahoo acquired CommonStock, a San Francisco-based social platform for retail investors to share insights based on their linked brokerage accounts. The site introduced a redesign in November 2023.

== Recognition ==
The Yahoo Finance app was a Webby Award honoree in 2017, and Yahoo Finance was an honoree in 2022. In 2023 and 2024, the New York Press Club gave Yahoo Finance awards for journalism.

== See also ==
- Google Finance
- MSN Money
- Online newspaper
