= General Morgan =

General Morgan may refer to:

- Charles Morgan (East India Company officer) (1741–1818), British Indian Army lieutenant general
- Daniel Morgan, Continental Army brigadier general
- Edwin D. Morgan (1811–1883), Union Army major general
- Frederick E. Morgan, (1894-1967) British Army lieutenant general, planner of Operation Overlord during World War II
- George W. Morgan (1820–1893), Union Army brigadier general
- Hill Godfrey Morgan (1862–1923), British Army brigadier general
- J. H. Morgan (1876–1955), British Army brigadier general
- James Morgan (congressman) (1756–1822) New Jersey Militia major general in the American Revolutionary War
- James D. Morgan (1810–1896), Union Army brigadier general and brevet major general
- John Morgan (physician) (1735–1789), Chief physician & director general of the Continental Army
- John Hunt Morgan, Confederate State Army brigadier general, leader of Morgan's Raid
- John Tyler Morgan, Confederate States Army brigadier general
- Michael Ryan Morgan (1833–1911), Union Army brevet brigadier-general
- Mohammed Said Hersi Morgan, Somali military and faction leader
- Thomas R. Morgan (born 1930), U.S. Marine Corps general
- William Duthie Morgan (1891–1977), British Army general

== See also ==
- Attorney General Morgan (disambiguation)
- Curt von Morgen (1858–1928), German Heer General of Infantry
