= Attorney General Morgan =

Attorney General Morgan may refer to:

- Don Morgan (born c. 1950), Attorney General of Saskatchewan
- Richard Morgan (Ceylonese judge) (1821–1876), Queen's Advocate of Ceylon
- Robert Burren Morgan (1925–2016), Attorney General of North Carolina
- William J. Morgan (Wisconsin politician) (1883–1983), Attorney General of Wisconsin

== See also ==
- General Morgan (disambiguation)
