= Siege of Khartoum currency =

Emergency money issued in 1884 in Sudan

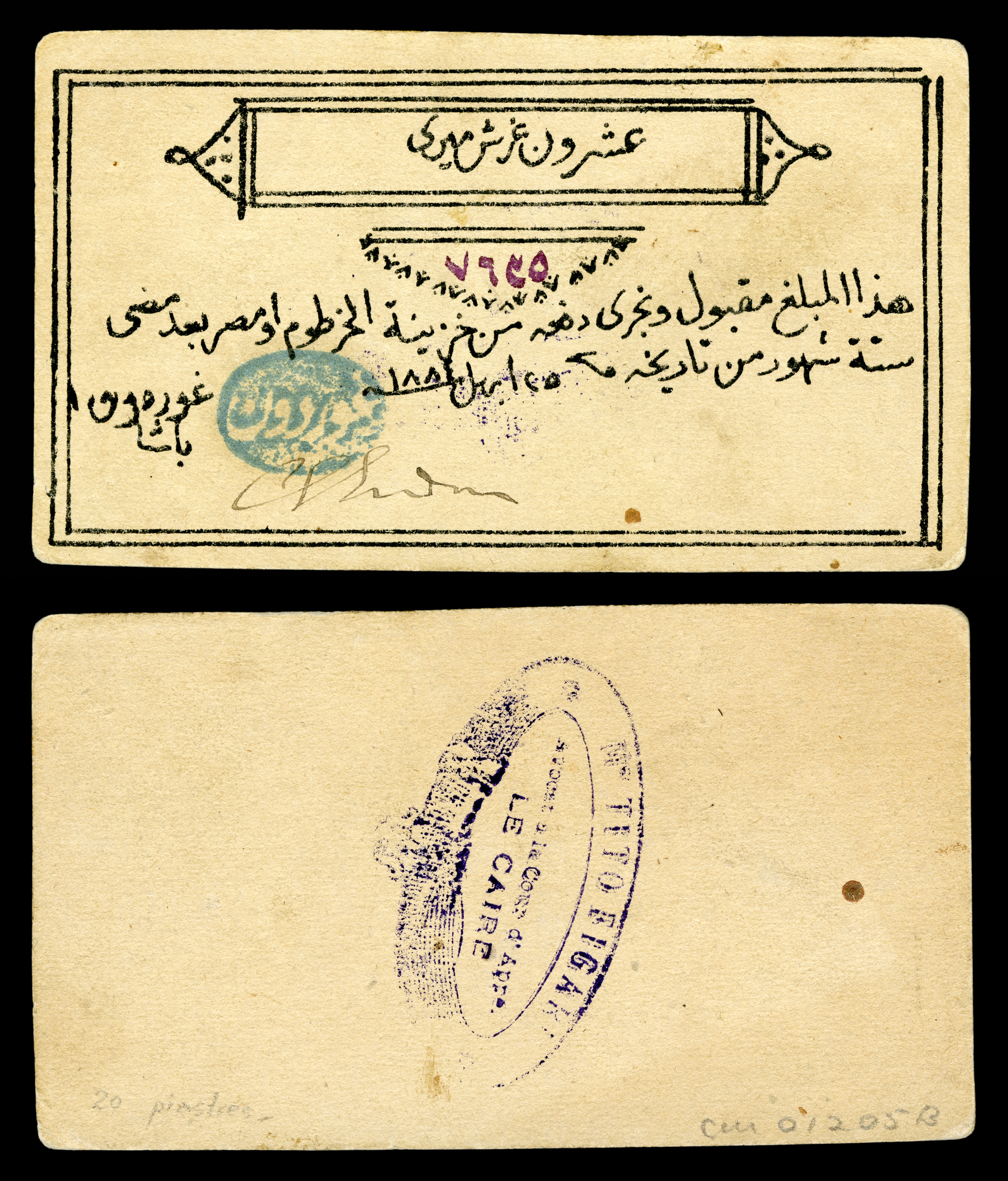
20 piastre promissory note issued and hand-signed by British Major-General Gordon during the Siege of Khartoum (1884)

Siege of Khartoum currency, an emergency paper money, was issued by governor-general of the Sudan, British Major-General Charles George Gordon during the siege of Khartoum. Denominated in piastre (and a £E50 note), the first issue notes were dated 25 April 1884 and produced as late as November 1884.

== Background ==
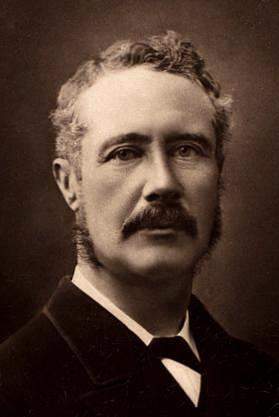
Charles George Gordon, nicknamed "Chinese" Gordon

=== Charles George Gordon ===
Gordon began his military career with the Royal Engineers (1852) and fought in the Crimean War and in China, playing a significant role in stopping the Taiping Rebellion (1863–1864). He was appointed Governor of Equatoria (1872–1876), and then Governor-general of the Sudan (1877–1880). Gordon was re-appointed to the post of Governor-general in January 1884 and arrived at Khartoum on 18 February 1884, less than one month prior to the siege.

=== Siege of Khartoum ===
Muhammad Ahmad bin Abd Allah, self-proclaimed Mahdi, engaged in the 18-year long Mahdist War (1881–1899) against the British Empire (Khedivate of Egypt), the Ethiopian Empire, the Congo Free State, and the Kingdom of Italy. In a series of telegrams in early March, 1884, Gordon informed the British government that the Mahdists were closing the roads, cutting off supplies and severing telegraph communications. As the fighting drew closer to the city walls, and the blockade tightened, the siege of the city of Khartoum (13 March 1884 – 26 January 1885) began. Reinforcements were denied, prompting Gordon to send a telegram (on about 8 April 1884) stating

As far as I can understand, the situation is this: you state your intention of not sending any relief up here or to Berber, and you refuse me Zebehr. I consider myself free to act according to circumstances. I shall hold on here as long as I can, and if I can suppress the rebellion I shall do so.

== Gordon-issued siege notes ==
Siege of Khartoum notes (1884)
5 piastres	10 piastres
20 piastres	100 piastres
500 piastres	1,000 piastres
2,000 piastres	2,500 piastres
5,000 piastres	50 Egyptian pounds

On 26 April 1884, Gordon issued £2,500 stg in notes, payable six months from issue. (Note: From a 30 July 1884 letter written from Gordon to Evelyn Baring (first British Consul-General of Egypt) and Nubar Pasha.) By the end of July, it is estimated that between £26,000 and £50,000 had been issued. Neither representative nor fiat money, Gordon’s notes were more promissory in nature, and were personally guaranteed, with the backing of the Egyptian government. Accepted by both merchants and soldiers, the notes initially provided economic relief and trade stimulus, but had begun to depreciate by July.

=== Design ===
The siege notes are printed on card stock using a lithographic process. The text of the notes is in Arabic, with different shapes (just above center and beneath the upper rectangle) representing the various denominations. (Note: The shapes are described in the Standard Catalog of World Paper Money for specialized issues as follows (verbatim): 5 – half-moon design going up at center 10 – oval design consisting of circles and angles at center 20 – half-moon design going down at center 100 – longer oval design of wavy line and dots at center 500 – circle with sawteeth at center 1,000 – more evenly oval design of circles and lines at center 2,000 – rectangle with sawteeth design at center 2,500 – plain half-moon going up with a smaller semicircular line coming down through it at center 5,000 – diamond design at center 50 pounds – diamond design at center.) The seal of the Governor-General appears in both English and Arabic on the higher denominations to the left and Gordon’s signature (either manuscript or hectographic) appears beneath his seal generally to the right on the higher denomination notes. Initially all notes were hand-signed by Gordon. As the issuance grew, notes with a hectographic signature were issued; however, merchants were reluctant to accept the printed signature variety, so Gordon returned to signing each note. On the reverse of most notes is a stamp of an Italian lawyer (Tito Figari) based in Cairo. (Note: Though not based on any referenced information regarding the reverse stamp itself, it suggests the notes were either initially printed or ultimately redeemed/canceled in Cairo.)

=== Issuance ===
Under the British Administration of Sudan there were four types of paper currency issued during the siege of Khartoum (the first two of which are illustrated in the table). Bearing a date of 25 April 1884, the first Sudan piaster issue was printed, in the following denominations: 1, (Note: The one-piastre note (not illustrated in the present set) is by far the rarest of all the denominations, and is not even illustrated in some key reference texts. Further, it is valued at roughly 50% more than another note (£E50) of which an estimated 12 pieces are known.) 5, 10, 20, 100, 500, 1000, 2000, 2500 and 5000 piastres. Also bearing the same issue date is the £E50 note (approximately 12 pieces known). A third type issued on 25 April 1884 is a £20 stg note (extremely rare), with text in French, and signed "Gordon Pasha". Finally, on 1 August 1884, a second issue of the 100 piastre note (extremely rare) was printed. Outside of the Standard Catalog of World Paper Money for specialized issues, images of the last two types could not be found. The known population of remaining siege of Khartoum notes varies by denomination from the first type 100 piastre note (roughly 1,250 known) to the £E50 note (roughly 12 known). Presumably there are fewer still of the one piastre, second type 100 piastre, and £20 stg notes.

== See also ==
- Siege money — Siege money has been issued by other governors in other sieges
