= Siege money =

Form of Notgeld money issued in times of siege, war or invasion

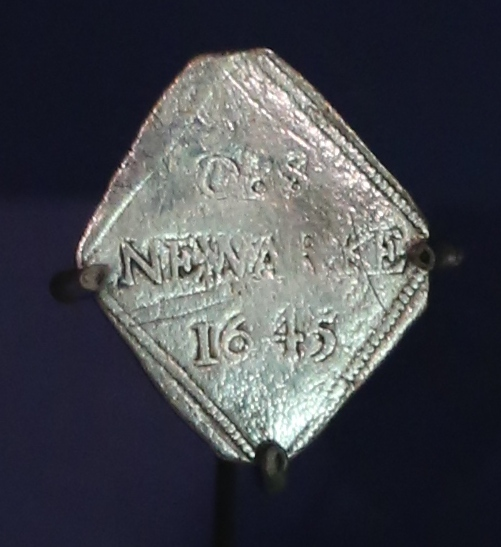
A lozenge-shaped shilling minted at Newark during the 1646 siege.

Siege money or money of necessity is a form of notgeld (emergency money) that was issued in times of war or invasion, such as during a siege.

In the early modern period, it was necessary in Europe because at that time coinage had an intrinsic value and even though a town was besieged commerce had to continue and soldiers had to be paid. There are examples from the Eighty Years War (1568–1648) and the English Civil War (1642–1651). There is also related coinage issued by some field commanders such as Duke of Ormonde in Ireland who did not have ready access to official coinage minted by the civil authorities (see Civil War mints).

The issuing of money during sieges is not restricted to that period; for example during the Siege of Khartoum (1884–1885) currency in the form of paper money was issued by Governor-General of the Sudan, British Major-General Charles George Gordon.

== Italian Wars ==
In 1524 siege money was produced by Antonio de Leyva, Imperial Commander of the garrison at Pavia in northern Italy. The town was then under siege by the forces of Francois I the French king. Further money was produced in 1527 during the Siege of Rome.

== Eighty Years' War ==
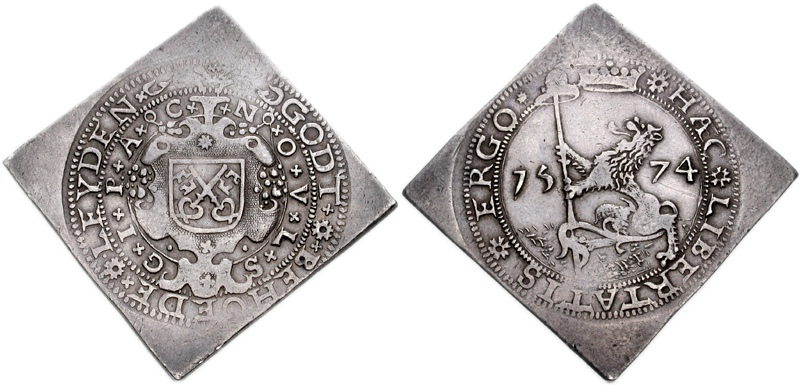
1574 coin from the siege of Leiden. The reverse side (left) states in Dutch: "May God protect Leiden". The obverse side (right) states in Latin: "This is about liberty". (Note: The reverse side also features an abbreviation in the inner circle: N. O. V. L. S. G. I. P. A. C. (Nummus Obsessae Vrbis Lugduni Sub Gubernatione Illustrissimi Principis Auraici Cusus), Latin for "Coin stamped in the besieged city of Leiden under the governance of the most illustrious Prince of Orange".)

During the Eighty Years' War a number of towns and cities issued their own currency (money of necessity), for example during the siege of Leiden (1573–1574), the authorities issued diamond (square) silver coinage struck with a circular die. When silver ran out they used the same die to print money on cardboard. This was the first usage of paper money in Europe. An anecdote about these coins tells of an incident of a conflict amongst the rebels about why they were fighting. The city government had issued coins with the slogan haec libertatis ergo ("this is about liberty"). In a 19 December 1573 church sermon, preacher Taling rebuked the city magistrate, comparing them to pigs and asserting the coins should have said haec religionis ergo ("this is about religion"). Secretary Jan van Hout was furious, pulled out his gun and asked mayor Pieter Adriaansz. van der Werff sitting next to him whether to shoot the dominee, but the mayor calmed him down.

== English Civil War ==
During the First English Civil War a number of garrisons issued their own siege money. They included Carlisle (1645), Scarborough (1645) and Newark-on-Trent (1646). Of these the siege money of Newark was the most plentiful and compared to other similar coins minted at the same time more has survived. Around 2011 a rarer Scarborough siege sixpence sold for £42,000, while in 2012 a Newark shilling sold for US$1,900.

During the Second English Civil War the besieged garrison of Pontefract Castle issued siege money. The coin design was changed to "for the son" after the trial and execution of Charles I on 30 January 1649.

== Bibliography ==
- Fraser, Paul (25 May 2011), "The Story of English Civil War siege money", CoinWeek
- Homren, Wayne (26 April 2015), "Selections from the Slaney Collection of English Coins", The Numismatic Bibliomania Society (NBS)
- Siege money of the Dutch Revolt (PDF), mdstatenumisassn.org, archived from the original (PDF) on 29 September 2017
- "STUART, Siege money. Newark. 1645-1646. AR Halfcrown...", Classical Numismatic Group (CNG), 23 May 2012
- "STUART, Siege money. Pontefract. 1648-1649. AR Shilling (29mm, 4.68 g, 12h). In the name of Charles I. Dated 1648.", Classical Numismatic Group (CNG)
- "O'Brien Coin Guide: The Ormonde Money of 1643-44", The Old Currency Exchange, 21 May 2015
