= Siege money (Newark) =

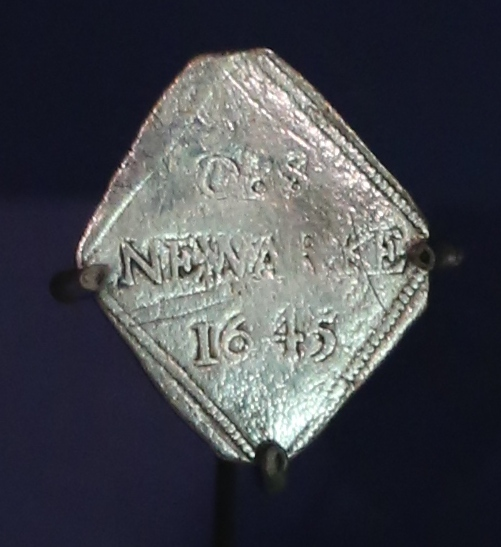
A lozenge-shaped shilling minted at Newark during the 1645–1646 siege.

Siege money or money of necessity was minted in Newark-on-Trent in 1646 during the third and final siege (1645–1646) — the last year of the First English Civil War. To meet need for money, the besieged Royalists set up a mint that manufactured lozenge-shaped coins — half-crowns, shillings, ninepences, and sixpences.

Royalist noblemen and gentlemen freely gave their flagons and drinking cups, and these were fashioned into the lozenge-shaped coins. On some of them it is possible to see the pattern of the cup and salver from which they were hastily cut.

The coins bore on the obverse a Royal crown between C R, and the value in Roman numerals; and on the reverse OBS Newark (OBS is an abbreviation of obsidium, Latin for siege), and the year 1645 or 1646, in which they were coined.

The year 1645 is confusing because all the coins were probably struck in 1646. Those struck with the year 1645 would have been struck before 25 March (the official start of the year Old Style) and those from 25 March with 1646. (Note: In England during the 1600s the official start of the year was 25 March (see the article Old Style and New Style dates).)

== History ==
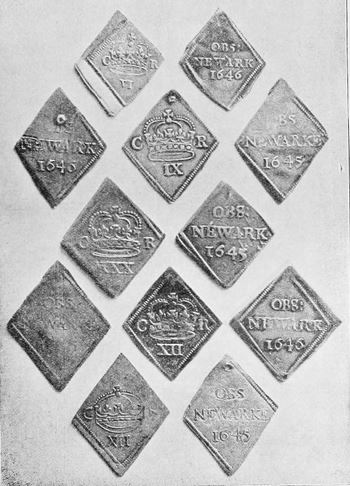
lozenge-shaped coins minted at Newark during the 1646 siege

The First English Civil War (1642–1646), commenced when the King Charles I raised his standard at Nottingham on 22 August 1642, 20 miles (32 km) south west of Newark. The town was a mainstay of the Royalist (Cavalier) cause: "Newark was besieged on three occasions and finally surrendered only when ordered to do so by the King after his own surrender". The town fielded at times as many as 600 soldiers, and raided many nearby towns of the opposing Parliamentarians (Roundheads). At the end of 1644 it was besieged, but relieved in March by Prince Rupert. Parliament commenced a new siege towards the end of January 1645 following more raiding, but this was relieved after a month. The final siege began in November 1645, by which time the town's defences had been greatly strengthened. King Charles surrendered at Southwell, 8 miles (13 km) west of Newark, on 5 May 1646. He ordered Newark to surrender, which accepted under protest by the town's garrison.

Coins were issued dated 1645 and 1646. Those struck in 1645 have face values of thirty, twelve, and nine pence; while those struck in 1646 have in addition sixpences. The general design of these coins is the same, the obverse having within a pearled border the letters C R on each side of a crown, and the value expressed beneath in Roman numerals; whilst upon the reverse was the legend OBS NEWARK, with the date beneath, in Arabic figures. All the coins issued from Newark are struck upon lozenge-shaped flans, which flans were apparently cut directly from the dishes, trenchers, and other varieties of silver plate, in the town, or obtained from Royalist adherents in the neighbouring country districts. Also silver from plundered from Leicester including the corporation's plate.

By detailed analyse of the coins it is possible to estimate their probable chronological sequence. The first piece to appear would be the shilling, which bears upon the obverse a most curiously shaped crown, the jewelled band of which is straight across the front, whilst the reverse reads OBS: NEWARKE 1645. This coin is found with the obverse struck from two separate dies:

1. 9 dots in the left arch of the crown, 9 dots in the right arch; C R and XII. being in thin letters (a). Weight, 94 grains.
2. 9 dots in the left arch, 8 dots in the right arch; C R and XII. being in thick letters. Weight, 93 grains (b).

The occurrence of two distinct obverse dies for this coin, in the opinion of Dr. Philip Nelson of Liverpool University (writing in 1904), disproved the theory that has been advanced that these pieces were forgeries; more especially since there are also shillings and ninepences, the obverses of which are known to be genuine, combined with the self same reverse.

The second coin to appear was probably the shilling with the same reverse reading, NEWARKE, but with a new obverse, the crown on which has a high arch and richly jewelled band. It weighs 87 grains.

At about the same time ninepences reading, NEWARKE, were struck, that with pieces from two different obverse dies:

1. 11 dots in the left arch, 11 dots in the right arch of the crown, which has a richly jewelled band. Weight, 69 grains (c).
2. 11 dots in the left arch, 9 dots in the right arch of the crown, which has a simple jewelled band. Weight, 68 grains (d).

Following this a shilling was issued with wording the following wording appearing for the first time OBS NEWARK 1645. The crown upon the obverse has 10 dots in the left arch, and 8 dots in the right arch of the crown, the jewelled band of which is of a very simple character. This piece weighs 92 grains. Upon one of the shillings of this date a retrograde R is engraved upon the obverse.

Subsequently, the ninepence which reads OBS : NEWARK 1645 appeared (e). The obverse die of this coin is identical with that of the ninepence previously described as "d", and has upon the crown 11 and 9 dots in the left and right arches respectively. This coin weight 64 grains. United with the same obverse die there was another reverse die in use, the same as found upon the half-crown of 1645, which is verified by the occurrence of a small dot beneath the 4 of the date, 1645. This ninepence weighs 63 grains (f).

The last denomination to be struck in 1645 was the half-crown, the obverse of which shows us a crown with a chequered arrangement of jewels on the band; whilst the reverse is from the same die as the NEWARK ninepence "f" of the same date. This coin, which weight 221 grains, is of comparative rarity, which would point to the fact of its having been struck very late in 1645, probably in March.

In regard to the coins struck at Newark in 1646, it is evident that the three higher values would be issued simultaneously, and no doubt towards the end of the siege, probably in April, the sixpence would appear, which no doubt accounts for its greater rarity. In considering the date of these coins it is necessary to remember that the year began on March 25 (and the end of the siege on 8 May).

The issues of 1646 are as follow:

- Half-crown. — obverse: From the same die as the half-crown of 1645. Reverse: From the same die as the shilling "b" and ninepences of 1646, as is proved by the occurrence a flaw in the 6 of the date. Weight, 243 grains.
- Shillings:
  1. Obverse: A crown with a simply jewelled band, having 10 dots in the left arch and 8 dots in the right arch. Reverse: OBS : NEWARK 1646 in somewhat thin letters. Weight, 86 grains.
  2. Overse: A crown with a richly jewelled band, having 10 dots in the left arch and 10 dots in the right arch. Reverse: OBS . NEWARK 1646 in thick letters, from the same die as the half-crown. Weight, 90 grains.
- Ninepence:
  1. Overse: From the same die as the ninepence "e" of 1645, having 11 dots in the left and 9 dots in the right arches respectively. Reverse: From the same die as the shilling (b) and half-crown of 1646. Weight, 67 grains.
  2. Obverse : A crown having the band elaborately jewelled, 10 dots in the left arch and lo dots in the right arch. Reverse: From the same die as the shilling "b" and half-crown of 1646. Weight, 68 grains.
- Sixpence: obverse: An elaborate crown, C R on each side and VI. beneath. Reverse: OBS : NEWARK 1646. Weight, 46 grains.

A lot of examples of the shilling, ninepence, and sixpence of 1646 are found to be gilt, and were doubtless struck upon flans cut from a service of gilt-plate.

Some specimens of the shilling and ninepence of 1646 exist having the Royal arms upon the reverse, and the coins so marked may have formed part of some Regal service of plate, which was sacrificed in order to pay the expenses of the siege.

Of the coins struck at Newark, two coins stand out. The first is a ninepence, in the collection of coins the property of the Corporation of Liverpool (in 1904), and is of importance since upon the reverse we find beneath the A of NEWARK a leopard's head, the hall-mark of the period. The second is a shilling which in 1904 was in the possession of Dr. Appleby, of Newark. That coin bears upon the reverse a capital M within a dotted indent, which appears to be a silversmith's private stamp, and indicates the source from whence the piece of plate originally came.

There was in the Hyman Montagu (1844–1895) collection a specimen of a shilling bearing only an impression of the obverse die, and the reverse being plain; the coin is, therefore, undated.

== Legacy ==
Surviving coins are collector's items and can be valuable; in 2012 a Newark shilling sold for US$1,900.

Apart from their obvious interest to numismatists and historians, images of the coins are used to decorate rubbish bins, and a few residents of Newark would like to introduce a "Newark Siege Pound" as a form of local currency they believe would benefit the local economy.
