= Half crown (British coin) =

Former coin of the United Kingdom and other territories

- United Kingdom
- Value: 2 shillings and 6 pence (12.5 new pence)
- Mass: 1816–1970: 14.14 g
- Diameter: 1816–1970: 32.31 mm
- Edge: Milled
- Composition: 1816–1919: 92.5% Ag; 1920–1946: 50% Ag; 1947–1970: Cupronickel
- Years of minting: 1707–1970

Obverse
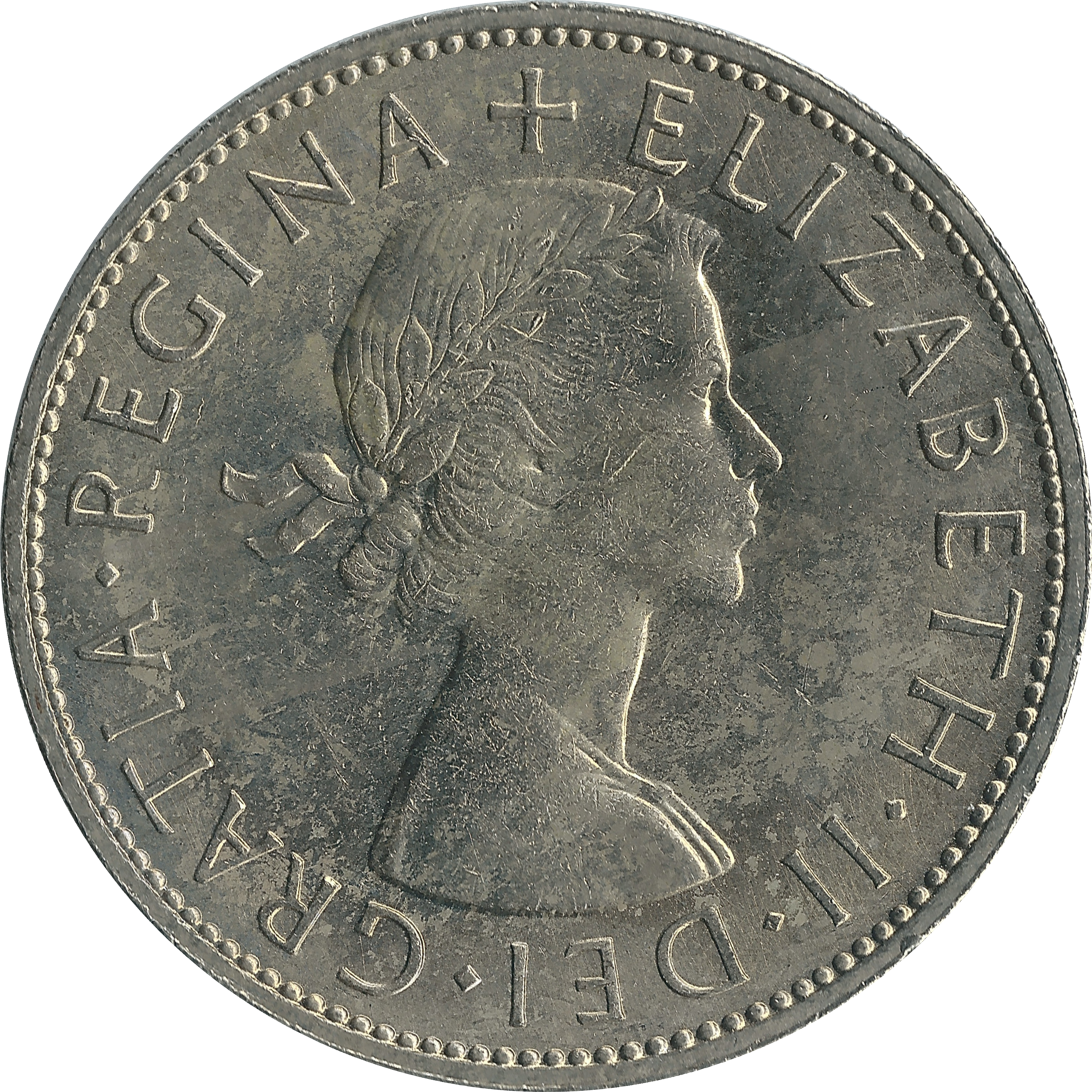
- Design: Profile of the monarch (Elizabeth II design shown)
- Designer: Mary Gillick
- Design date: 1953

Reverse
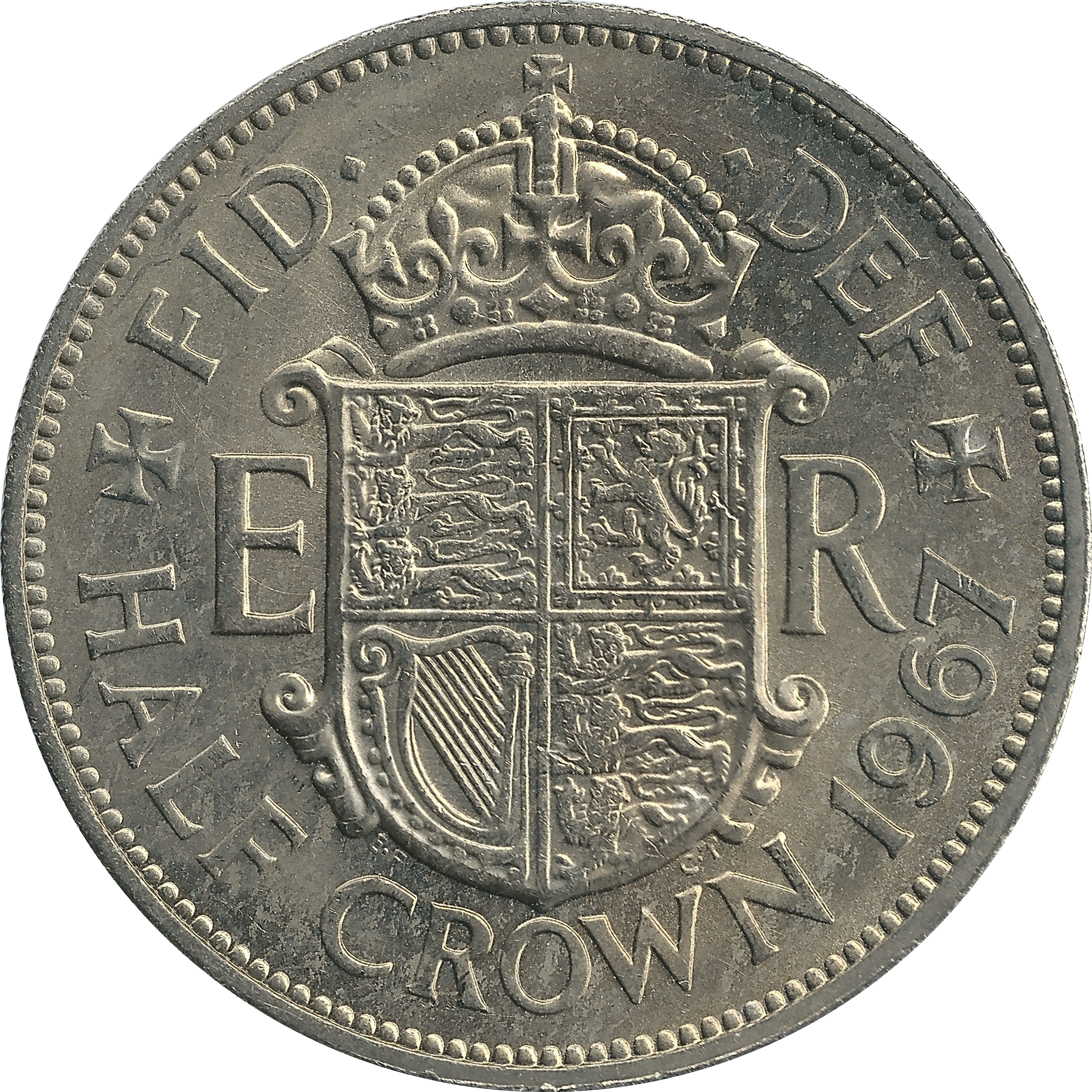
- Design: Various (crowned Royal Shield shown)
- Designer: Edgar Fuller and Cecil Thomas
- Design date: 1967

The British half crown was a denomination of sterling coinage worth 1/8 pound, or two shillings and six pence (abbreviated "2/6", familiarly "two and six"), or 30 pre-decimal pence. This is the equivalent of 12.5 new pence. The gold half crown was first issued in England in 1526, in the reign of Henry VIII, with a value half that of the crown coin. The first silver half crown appeared in 1551, under Edward VI and was dated. No half crowns were issued in the reign of Mary I, but from the reign of Elizabeth I half crowns were issued in every reign except that of Edward VIII, until the coins were discontinued in 1970.

During the English Interregnum of 1649–1660, a republican half crown was issued, bearing the arms of the Commonwealth of England, despite monarchist associations of the coin's name. When Oliver Cromwell was made Lord Protector of England, half crowns were issued bearing his portrait depicting him wearing a laurel wreath in the manner of a Roman Emperor. The half crown did not display its value on the reverse until 1893. In the 20th century a slang term for the coin was "half-a-dollar".

The half crown was demonetised (ahead of other pre-decimal coins) on 1 January 1970, the year before the United Kingdom adopted decimal currency on Decimal Day.

== History of the half crown by reign ==
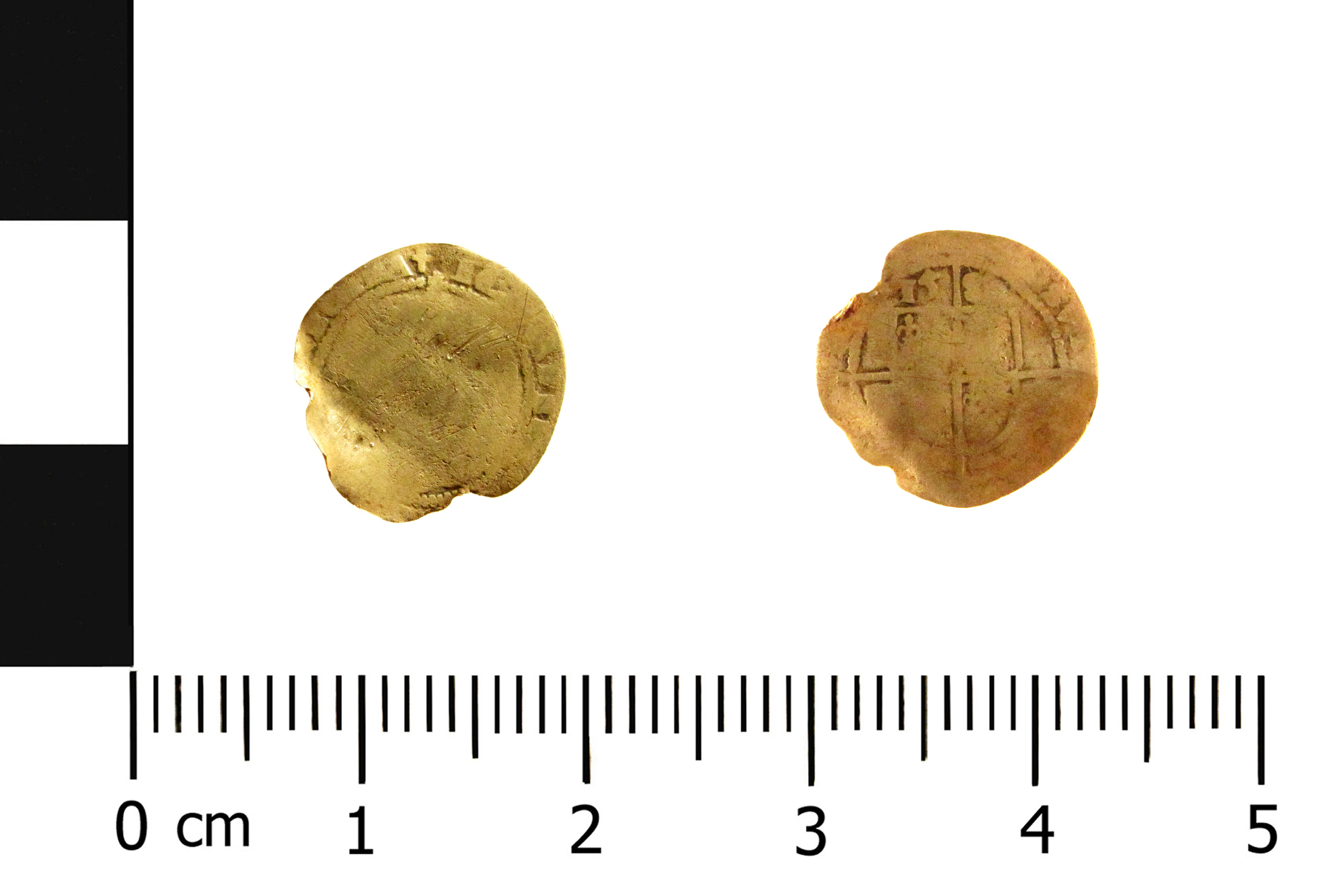
Gold half crown of Elizabeth I, 1580/81

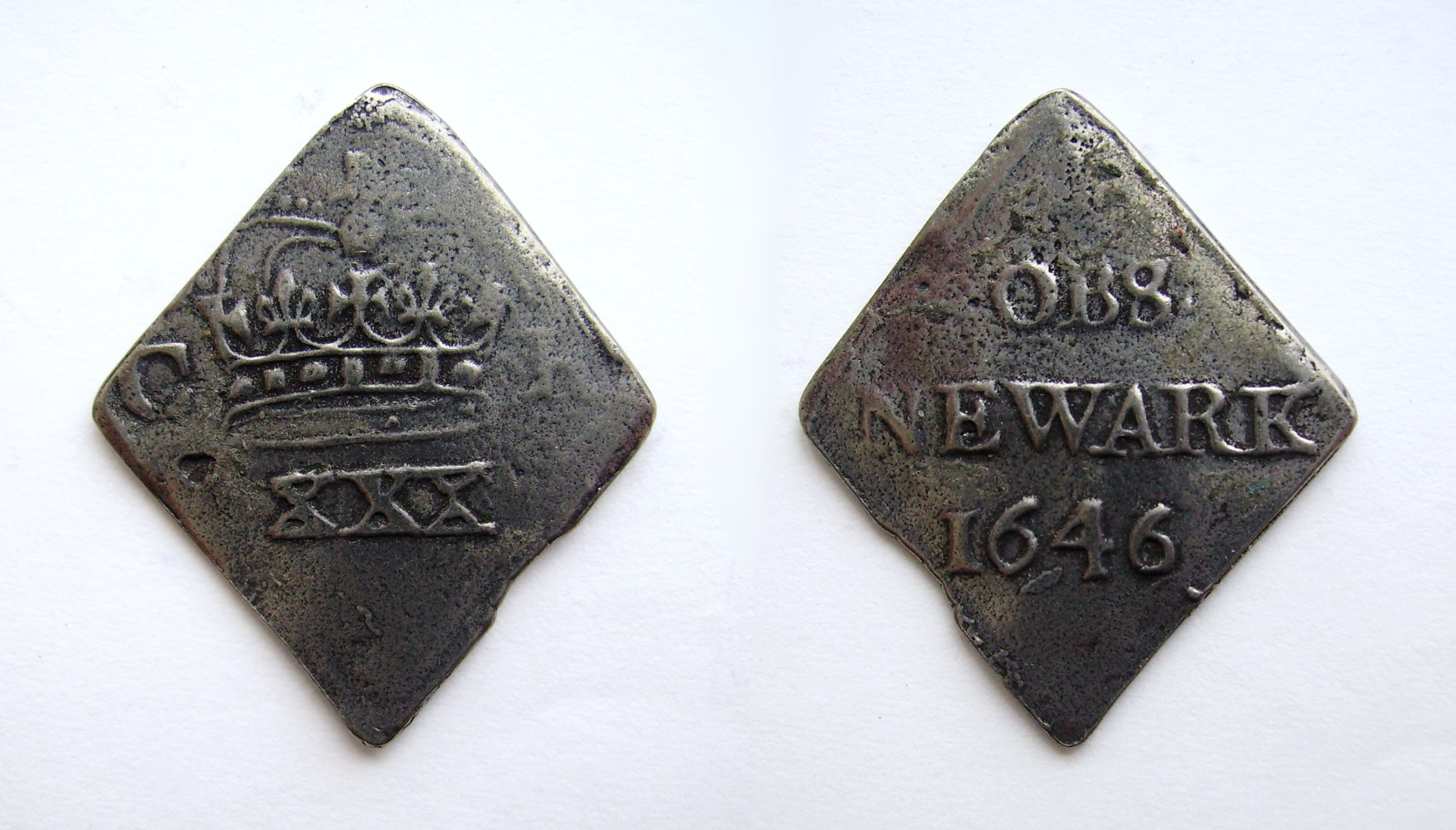
This Charles I half crown was struck from a piece of hammered silver plate during one of the Civil War sieges of Newark, Nottinghamshire.

- King Henry VIII 1526: the first English half crown was struck in gold.
- King Edward VI: issued gold half crowns, and in 1551 the first half crown in silver, which was dated and showed the king riding a horse.
- Queen Mary I: the half crown was struck on Mary's marriage to Philip II of Spain in 1554 but was never issued for circulation. Three specimens exist.
- Queen Elizabeth I: gold half crowns were issued again. At the end of the reign silver half crowns were issued.
- King James I: gold half crowns were issued again. During the reign silver half crowns were issued.
- King Charles I: silver half crowns were issued, including those struck as obsidional money, money of necessity during the Civil War period.
- Commonwealth of England: Oliver Cromwell silver half crowns were issued. During the years 1656 and 1658 milled half crowns were issued of Oliver Cromwell.
- King Charles II 1663–1685: silver half crowns were issued, and this period saw the end of the hammered issue of half crowns.
- King James II 1685–1688: silver half crown.
- King William III & Queen Mary II 1689–1694: silver half crown.
- King William III 1694–1702: silver half crown.
- Queen Anne 1702–1714: silver half crown.
- King George I 1714–1727: silver half crown.
- King George II 1727–1760: silver half crown.
- King George III 1760–1820: silver half crown.
- King George IV 1820–1830: silver half crown.
- King William IV 1830–1837: silver half crown.
- Queen Victoria 1837–1901: silver half crown.
- King Edward VII 1902–1910: silver half crown.
- King George V 1910–1936: silver half crown, sterling silver (92½% silver) until 1919, then 50% silver.
- King Edward VIII 1936: 50% silver half crown. Not issued for circulation.
- King George VI 1937–1952: 50% silver half crowns were issued until 1946 when the metal was changed to cupro-nickel.
- Queen Elizabeth II 1953–1967: the last half crown for general circulation was issued in 1967, and the coin was withdrawn in 1970, before decimalisation. Proof sets of £sd coins, including the half crown, were issued by the Royal Mint, bearing the date 1970.

== Size and weight ==
From 1816, in the reign of George III, half crown coins had a diameter of 32 mm and a weight of 14.14 grams (defined as 5/11 troy ounce), dimensions which remained the same for the half crown until decimalisation in 1971.

== Mintages ==
The mintage figures below are taken from the annual UK publication Coin Yearbook.

Half-crown mintages 1887–1970
Monarch	Obverse variant	Year	Mintages	
Monarch	Obverse variant	Year	General	Proof
Victoria	Jubilee	1887	1,438,046	1,084
Victoria	Jubilee	1888	1,428,787	
Victoria	Jubilee	1889	4,811,954	
Victoria	Jubilee	1890	3,228,111	
Victoria	Jubilee	1891	2,284,632	
Victoria	Jubilee	1892	1,710,946	
Victoria	Old head	1893	1,792,600	1,312
Victoria	Old head	1894	1,524,960	
Victoria	Old head	1895	1,772,662	
Victoria	Old head	1896	2,148,505	
Victoria	Old head	1897	1,678,643	
Victoria	Old head	1898	1,870,055	
Victoria	Old head	1899	2,865,872	
Victoria	Old head	1900	4,479,128	
Victoria	Old head	1901	1,516,570	
Edward VII		1902	1,316,008	15,123
Edward VII		1903	274,840	
Edward VII		1904	709,652	
Edward VII		1905	166,008	
Edward VII		1906	2,886,206	
Edward VII		1907	3,693,930	
Edward VII		1908	1,758,889	
Edward VII		1909	3,051,592	
Edward VII		1910	2,557,685	
George V		1911	2,914,573	6,007
George V		1912	4,700,789	
George V		1913	4,090,169	
George V		1914	18,333,003	
George V		1915	32,433,066	
George V		1916	29,530,020	
George V		1917	11,172,052	
George V		1918	29,079,592	
George V		1919	10,266,737	
George V		1920	17,982,077	
George V		1921	23,677,889	
George V		1922	16,396,724	
George V		1923	26,308,526	
George V		1924	5,866,294	
George V		1925	1,413,461	
George V		1926	4,473,516	
George V		1927	6,837,872	15,000
George V		1928	18,762,727	
George V		1929	17,632,636	
George V		1930	809,051	
George V		1931	11,264,468	
George V		1932	4,793,643	
George V		1933	10,311,494	
George V		1934	2,422,399	
George V		1935	7,022,216	
George V		1936	7,039,423	
George VI		1937	9,106,440	26,402
George VI		1938	6,426,478	
George VI		1939	15,478,635	
George VI		1940	17,948,439	
George VI		1941	15,773,984	
George VI		1942	31,220,090	
George VI		1943	15,462,875	
George VI		1944	15,255,165	
George VI		1945	19,849,242	
George VI		1946	22,724,873	
George VI		1947	21,911,484	
George VI		1948	71,164,703	
George VI		1949	28,272,512	
George VI		1950	28,335,500	17,513
George VI		1951	9,003,520	20,000
George VI		1952	1	
Elizabeth II		1953	4,333,214	40,000
Elizabeth II		1954	11,614,953	
Elizabeth II		1955	23,628,726	
Elizabeth II		1956	33,934,909	
Elizabeth II		1957	34,200,563	
Elizabeth II		1958	15,745,668	
Elizabeth II		1959	9,028,844	
Elizabeth II		1960	19,929,191	
Elizabeth II		1961	25,887,897	
Elizabeth II		1962	24,013,312	
Elizabeth II		1963	17,625,200	
Elizabeth II		1964	5,973,600	
Elizabeth II		1965	9,778,440	
Elizabeth II		1966	13,375,200	
Elizabeth II		1967	33,058,400	
Elizabeth II		1970	0	750,000

== Gallery ==
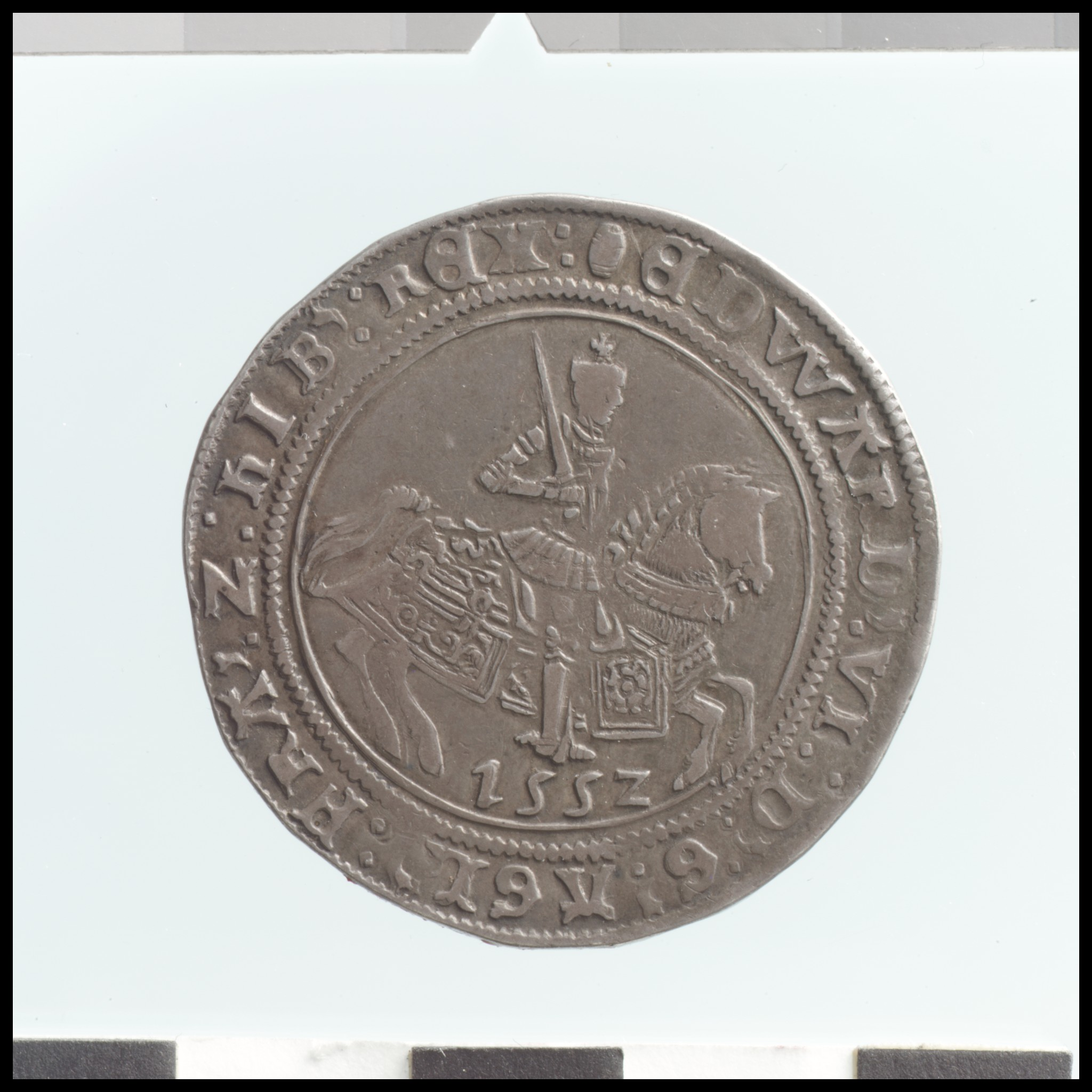
Edward VI half-crown, 1552

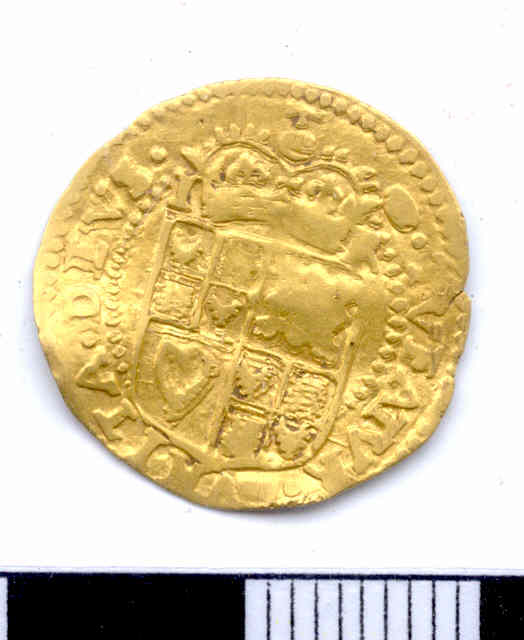
Gold half crown of James I

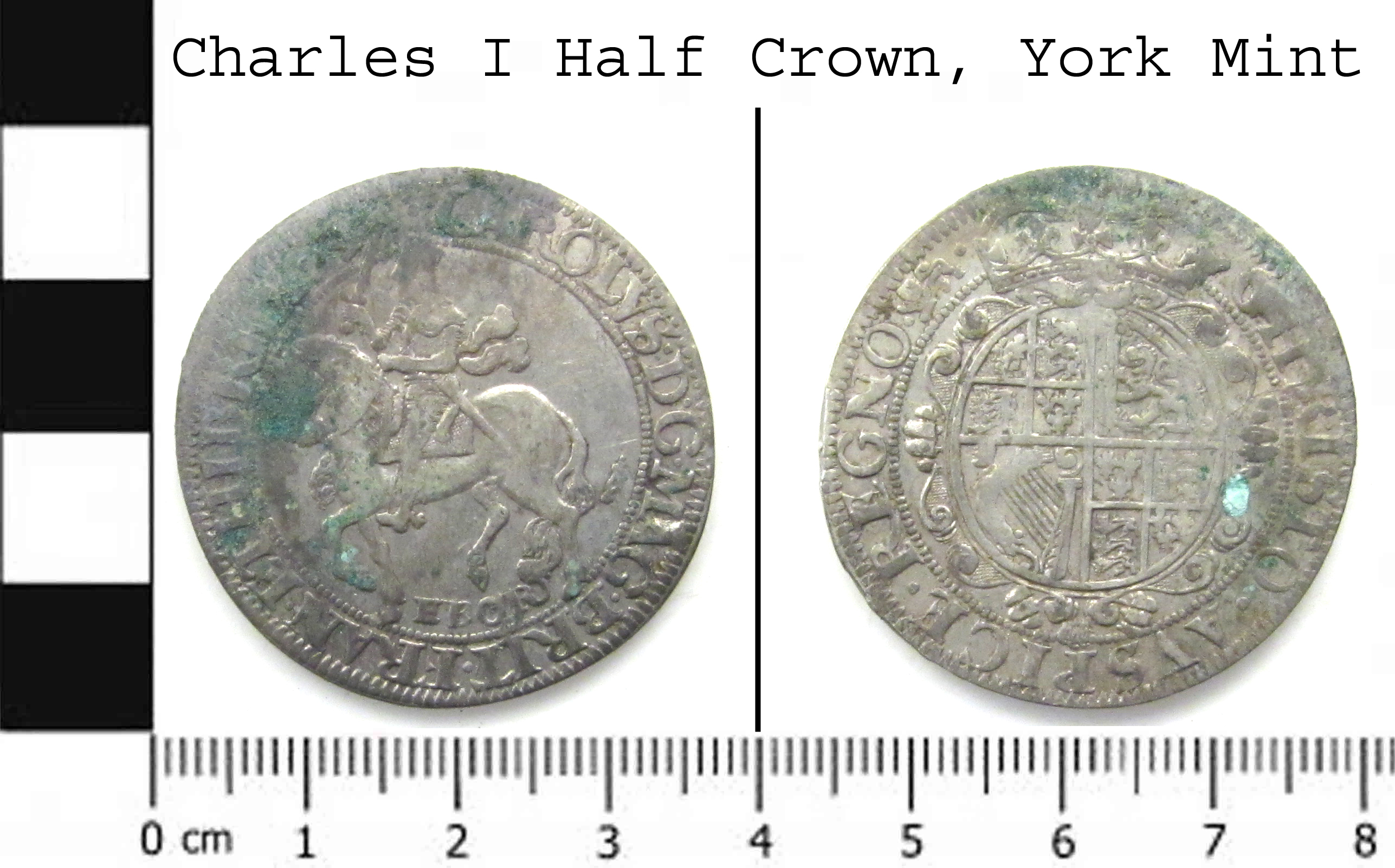
Charles I half-crown

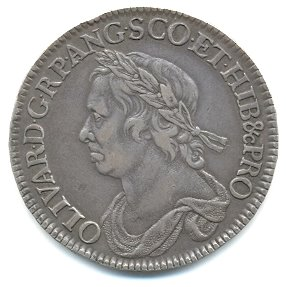
Half crown coin of Oliver Cromwell, 1658

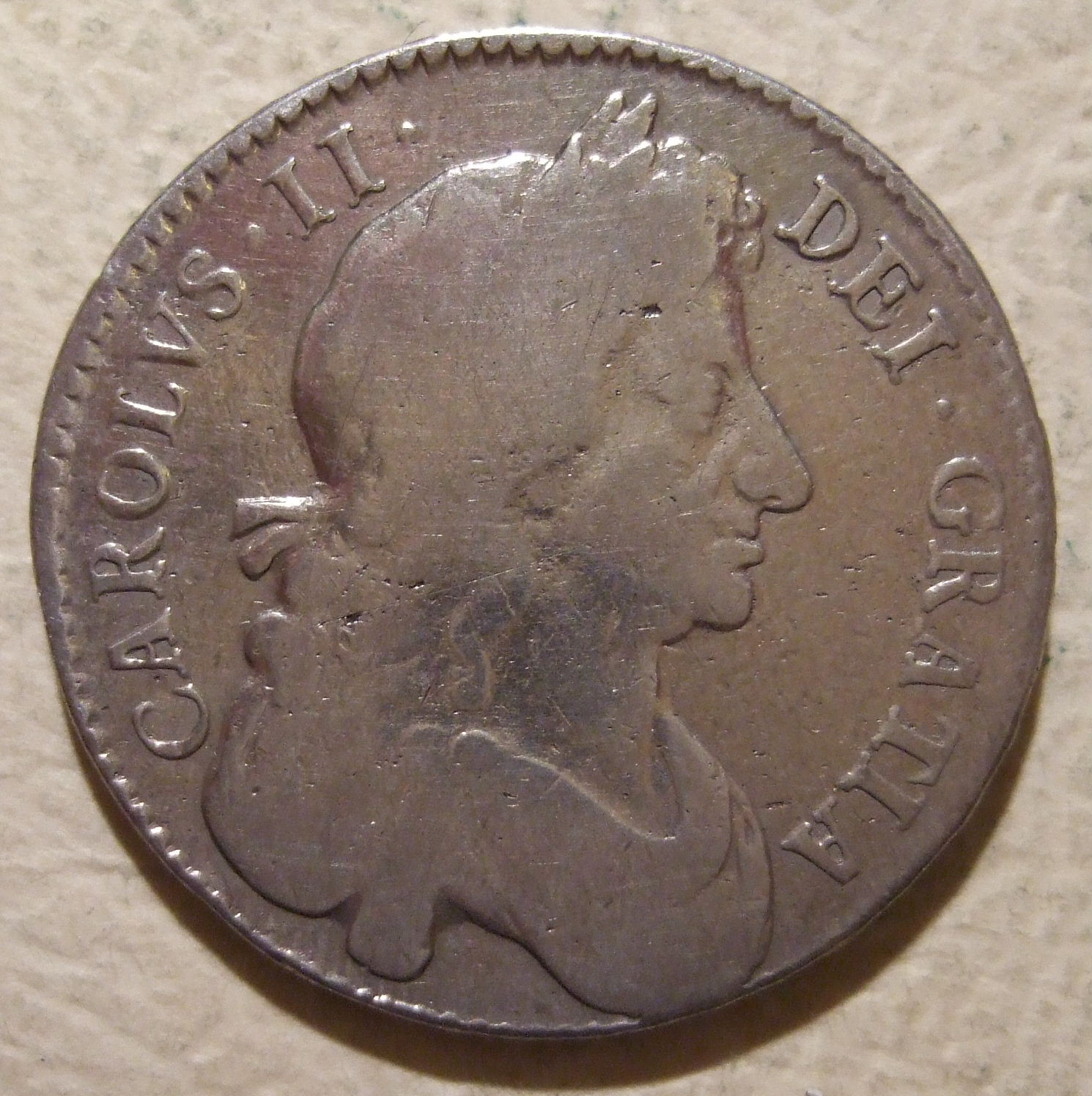
Half crown of Charles II, 1680

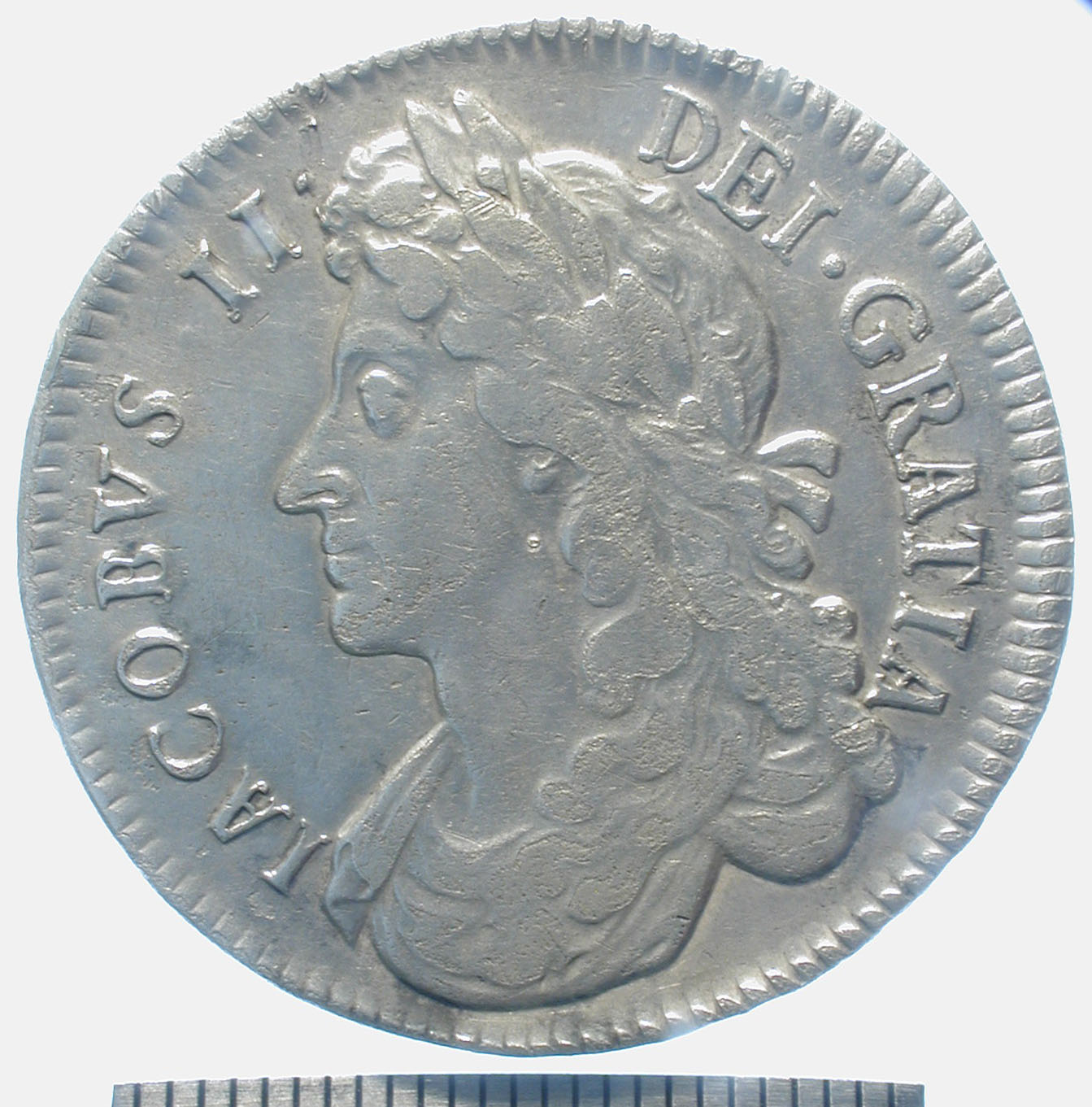
Half crown of James II, 1687

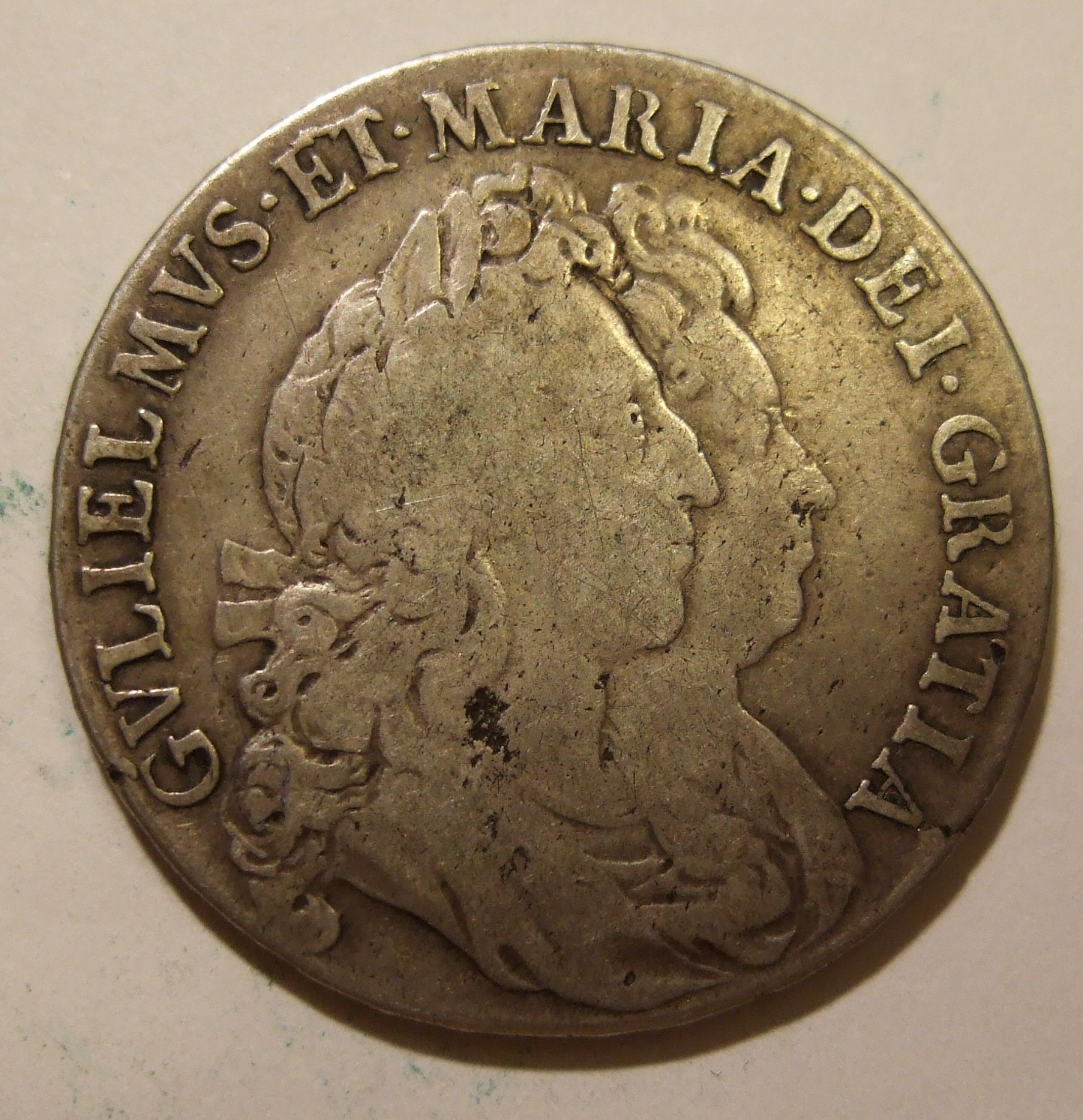
Half crown of 1691: William III and Mary II

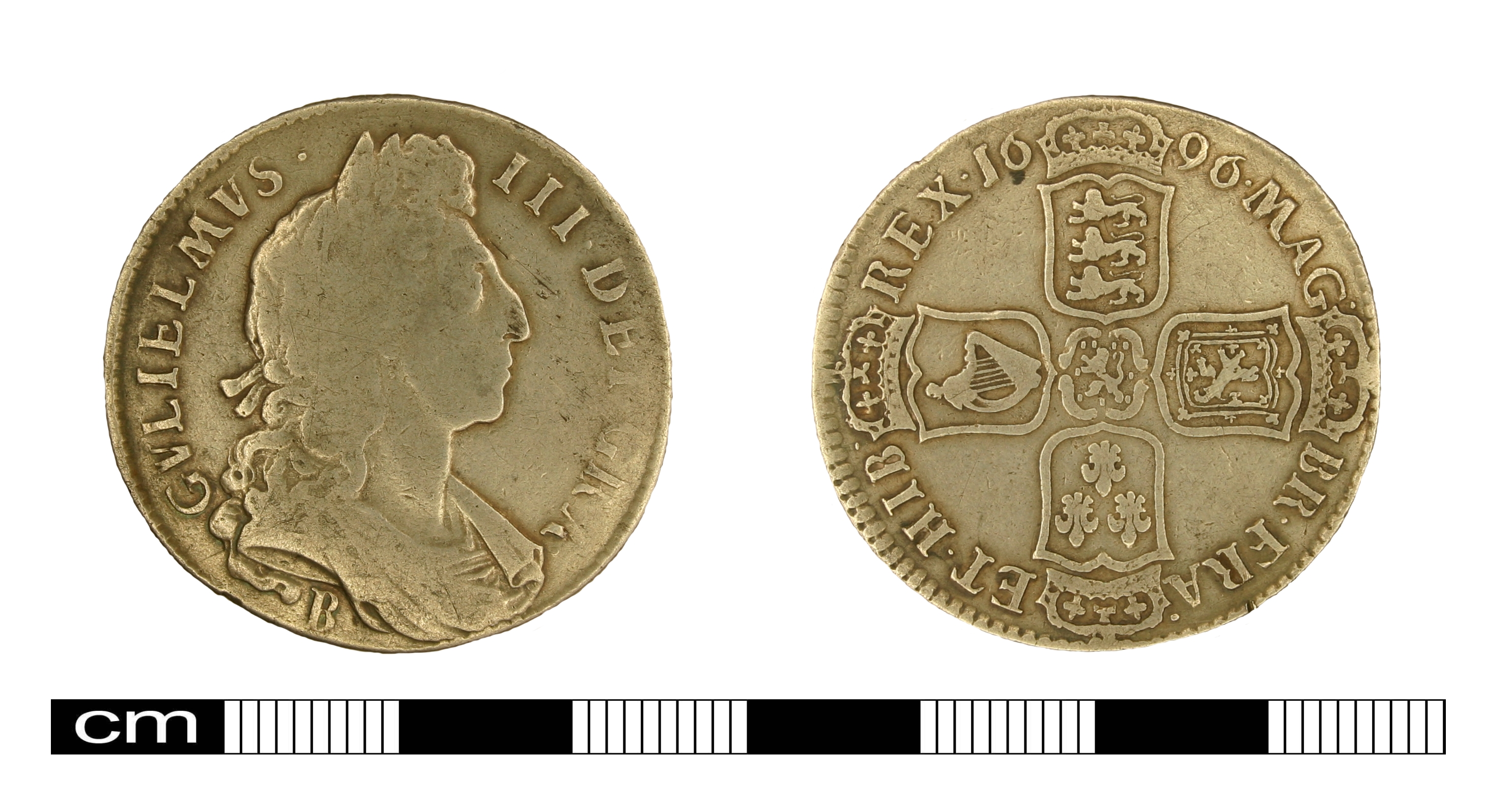
Half crown of William III, 1696

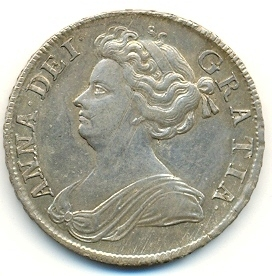
Half crown of Queen Anne

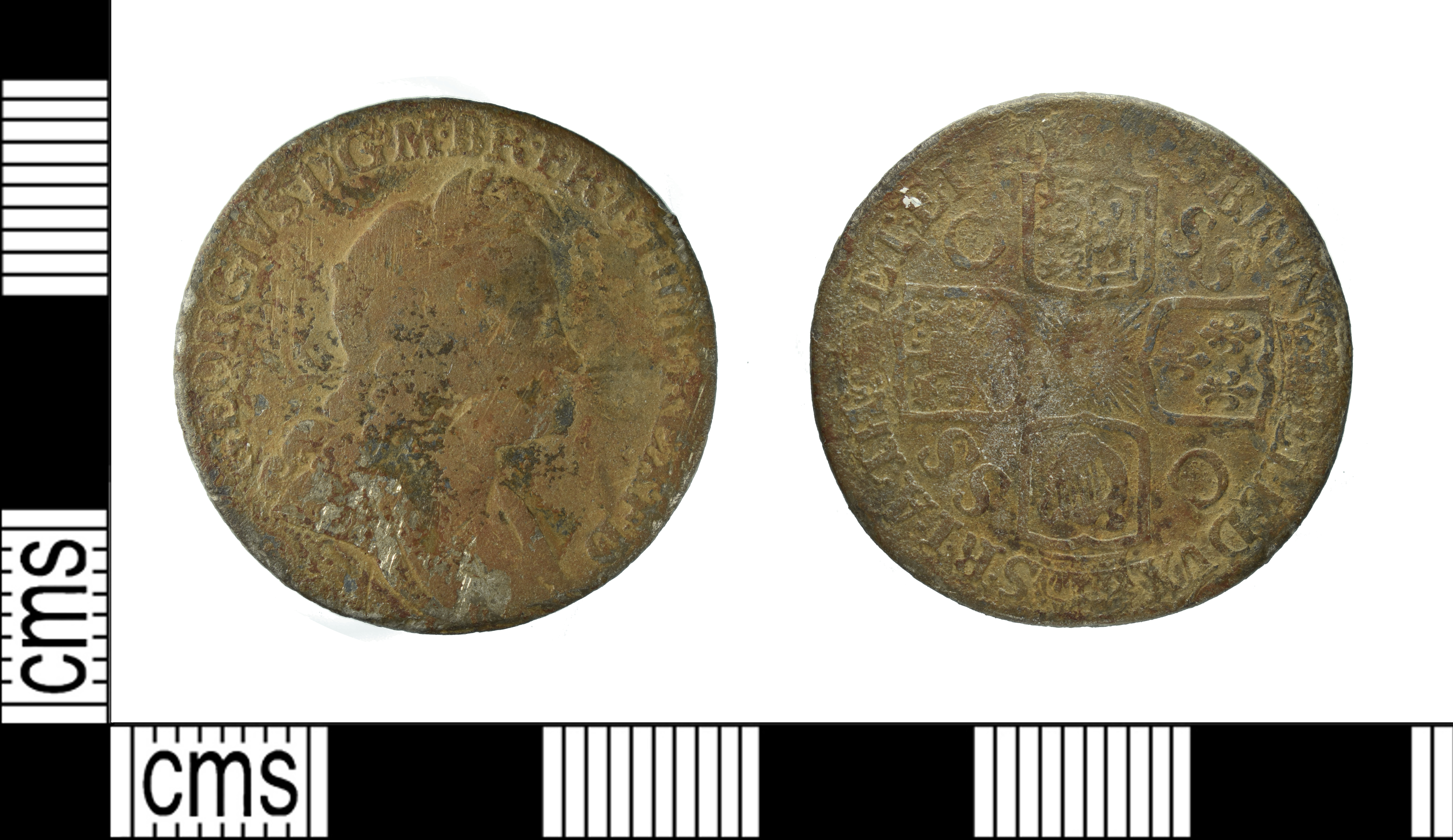
Half crown of George I, 1723

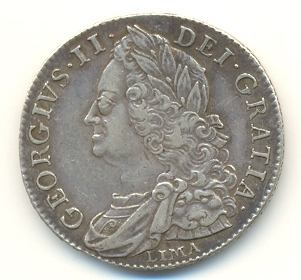
Half crown of George II, 1746

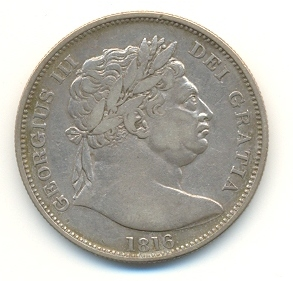
Half crown of George III, 1816

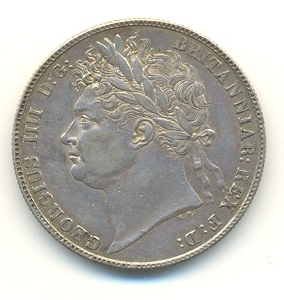
Half crown of George IV, 1821

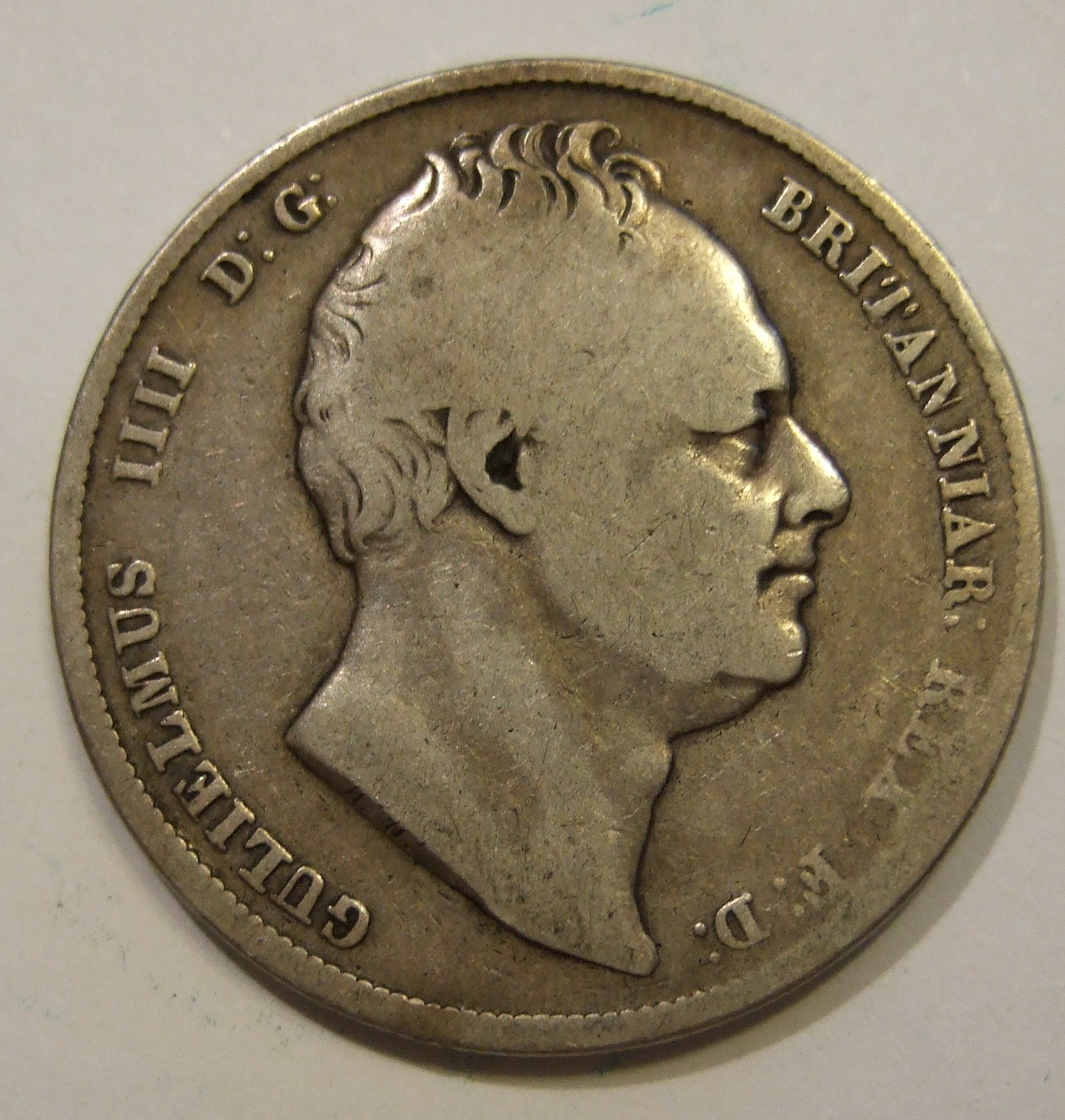
Half crown of William IV, 1836

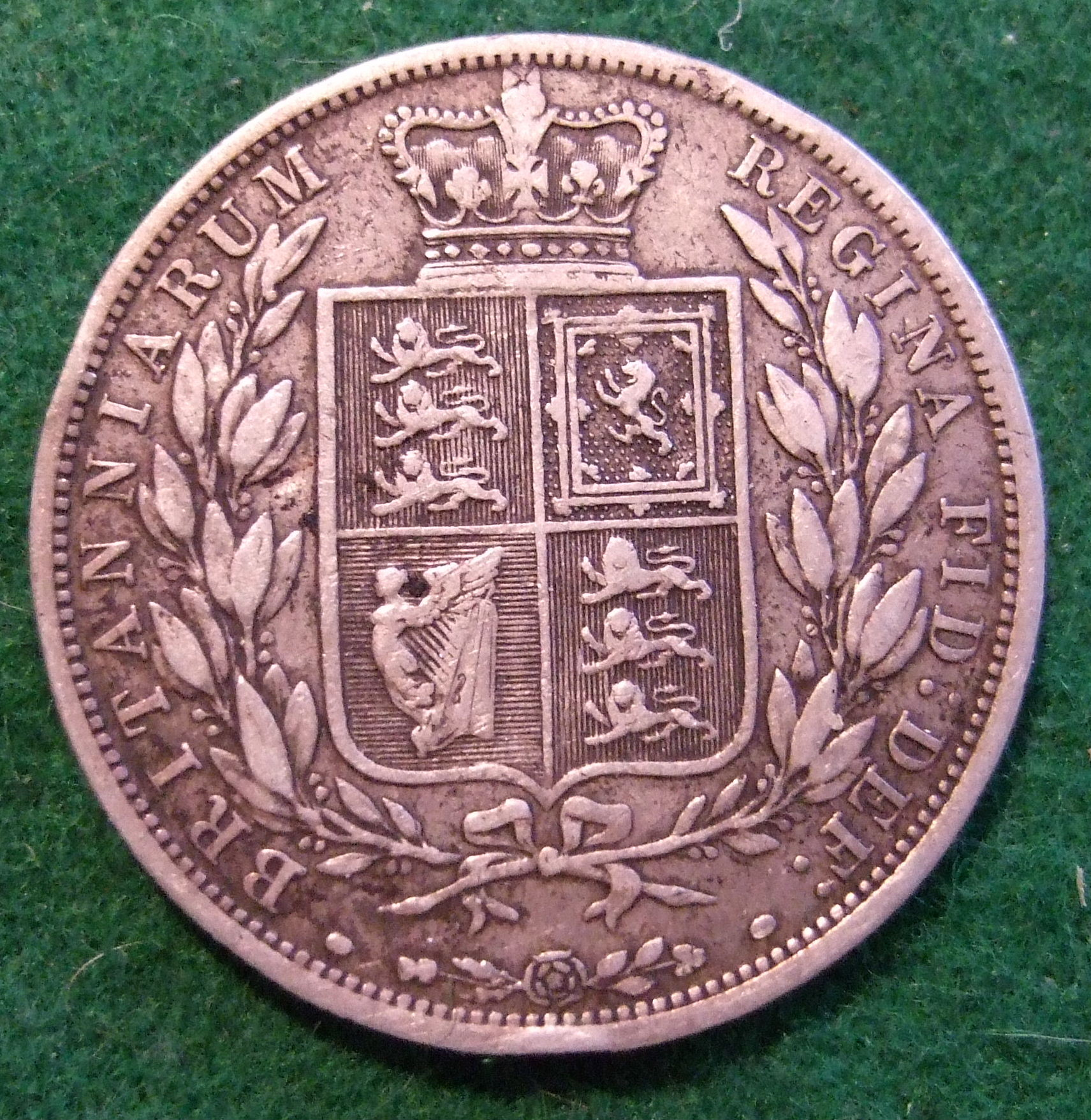
Half-crown of Victoria, 1885

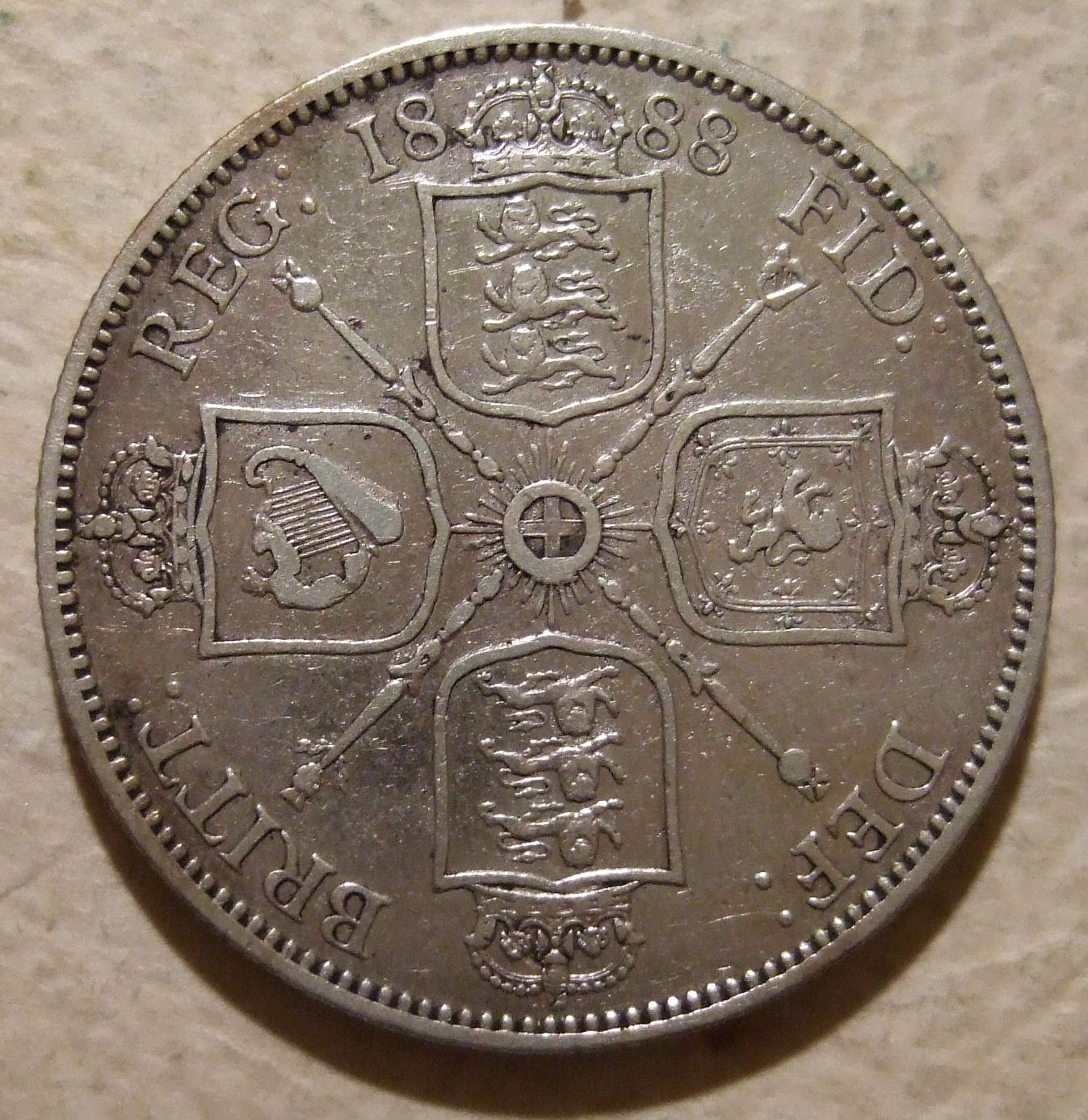
Half-crown of Victoria, 1888

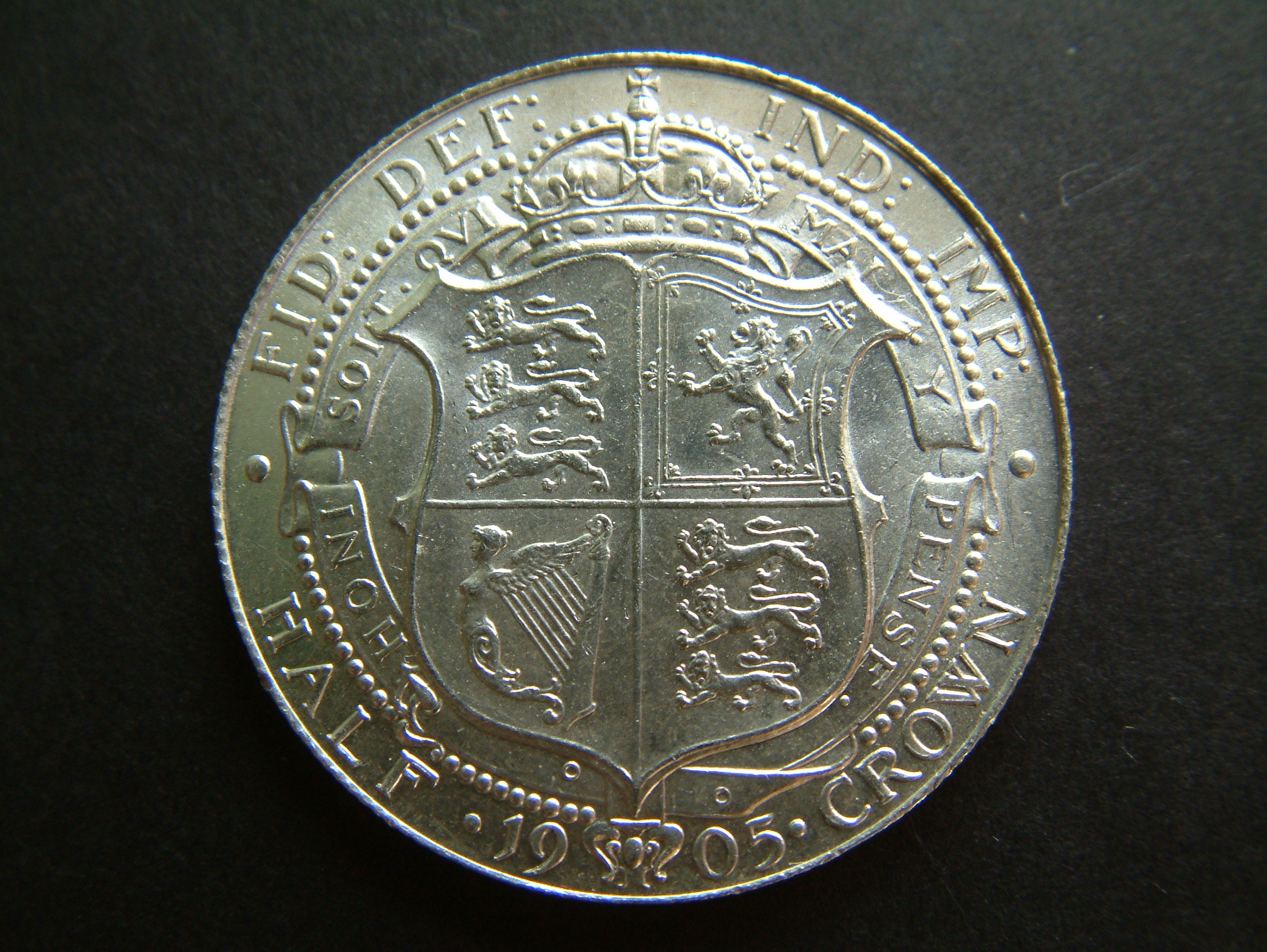
The reverse of the 1905, Edward VII, half crown

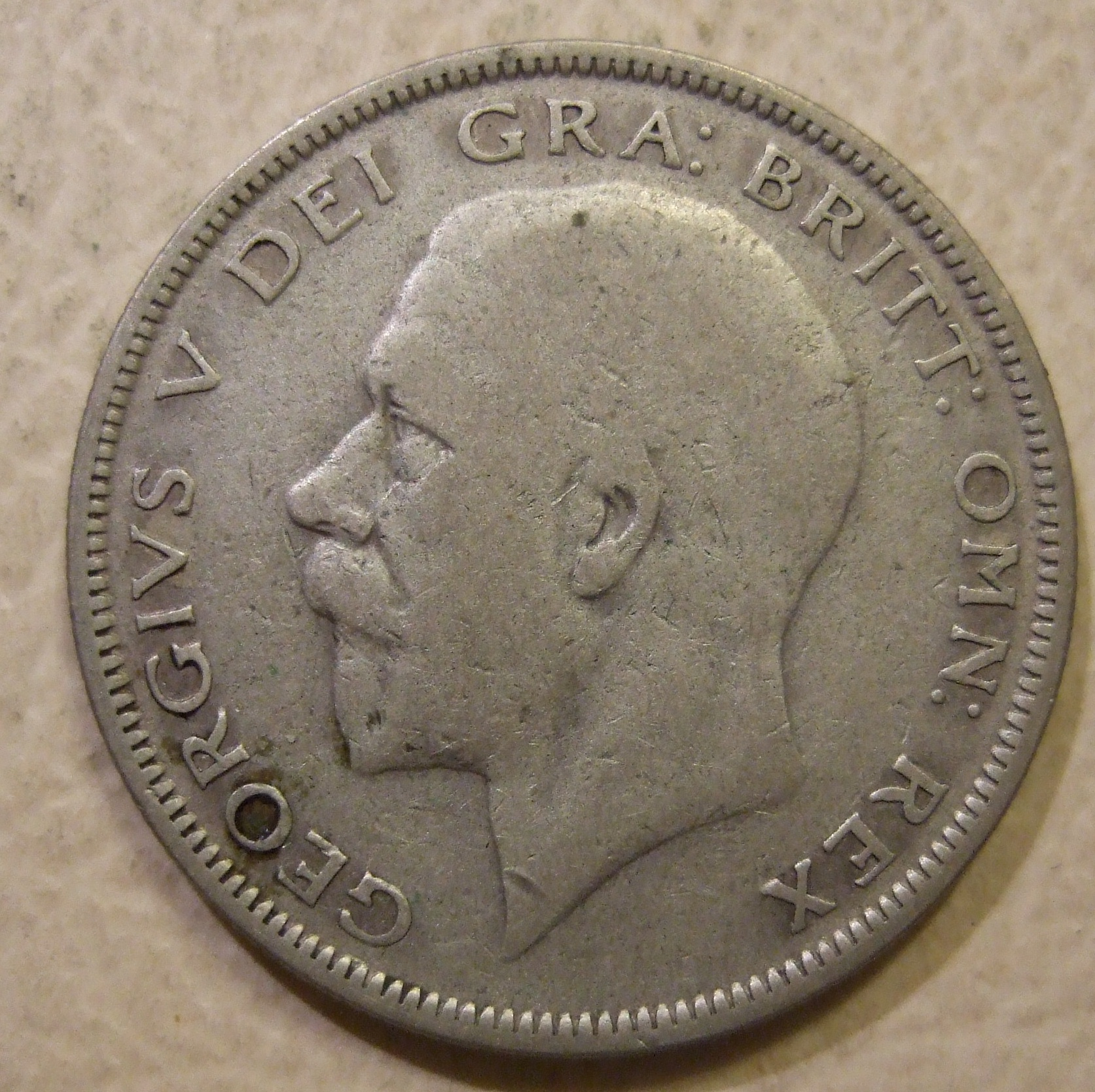
George V half crown, 1930

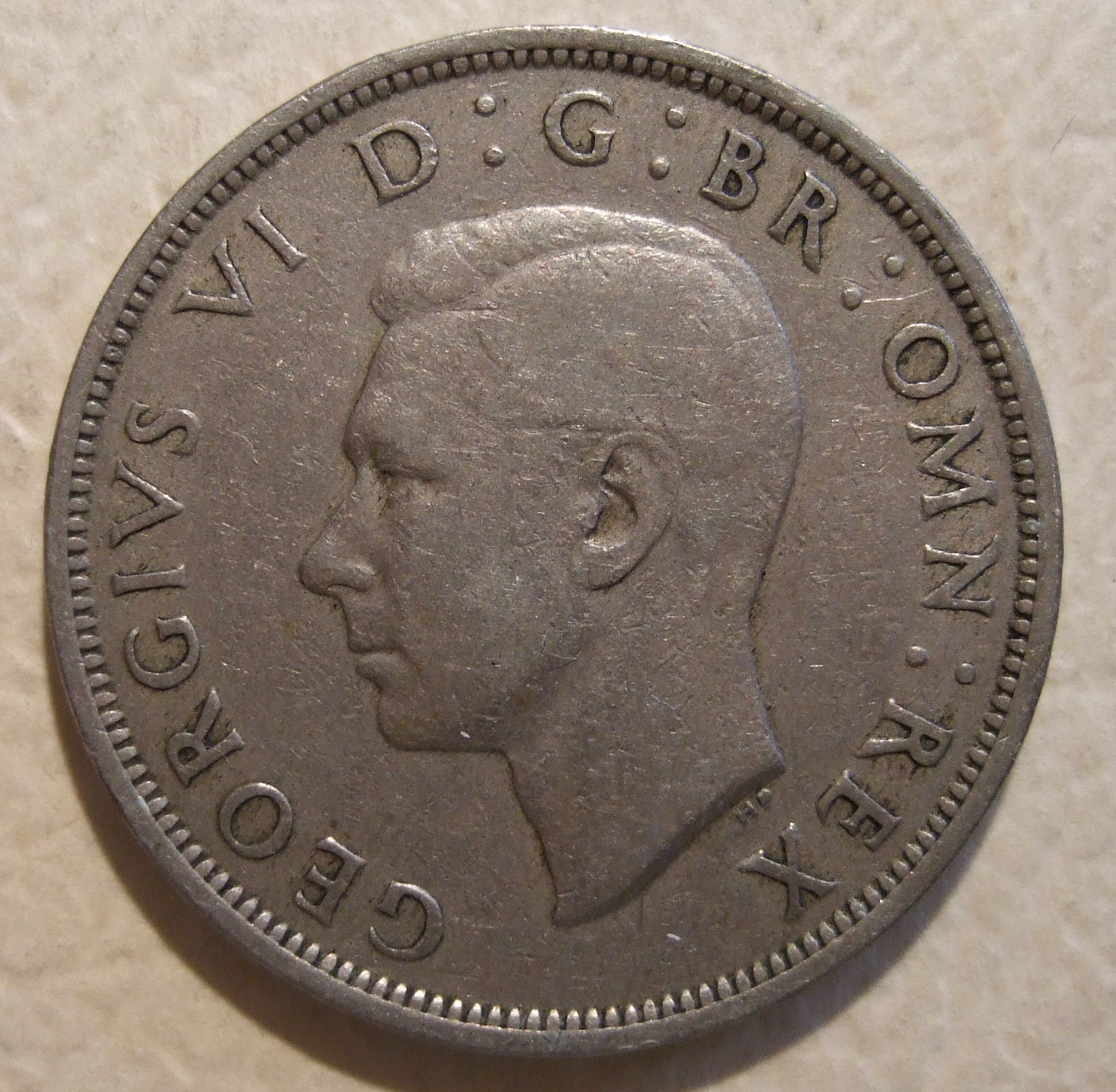
George VI half crown, 1948

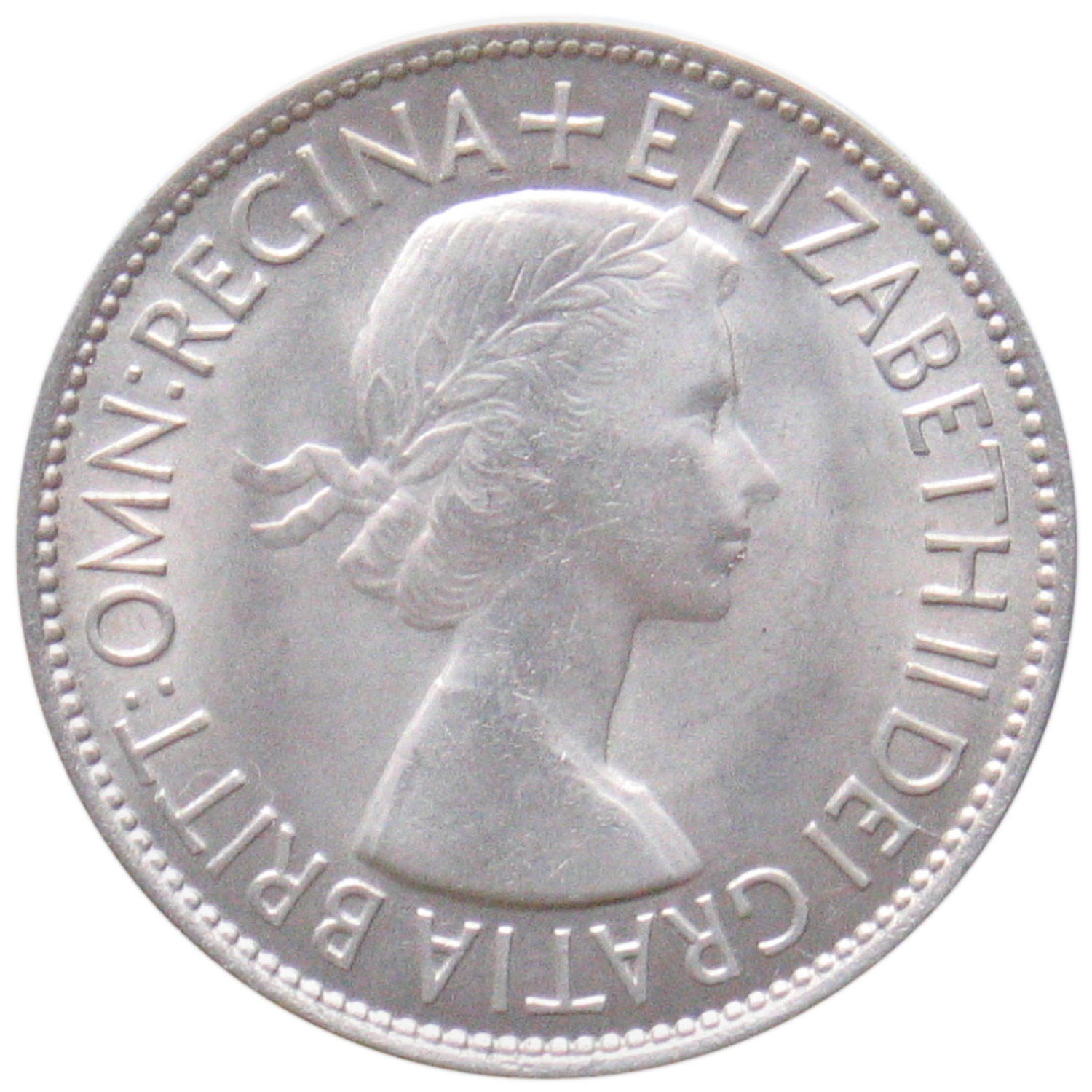
The obverse of the 1953, Elizabeth II, half crown

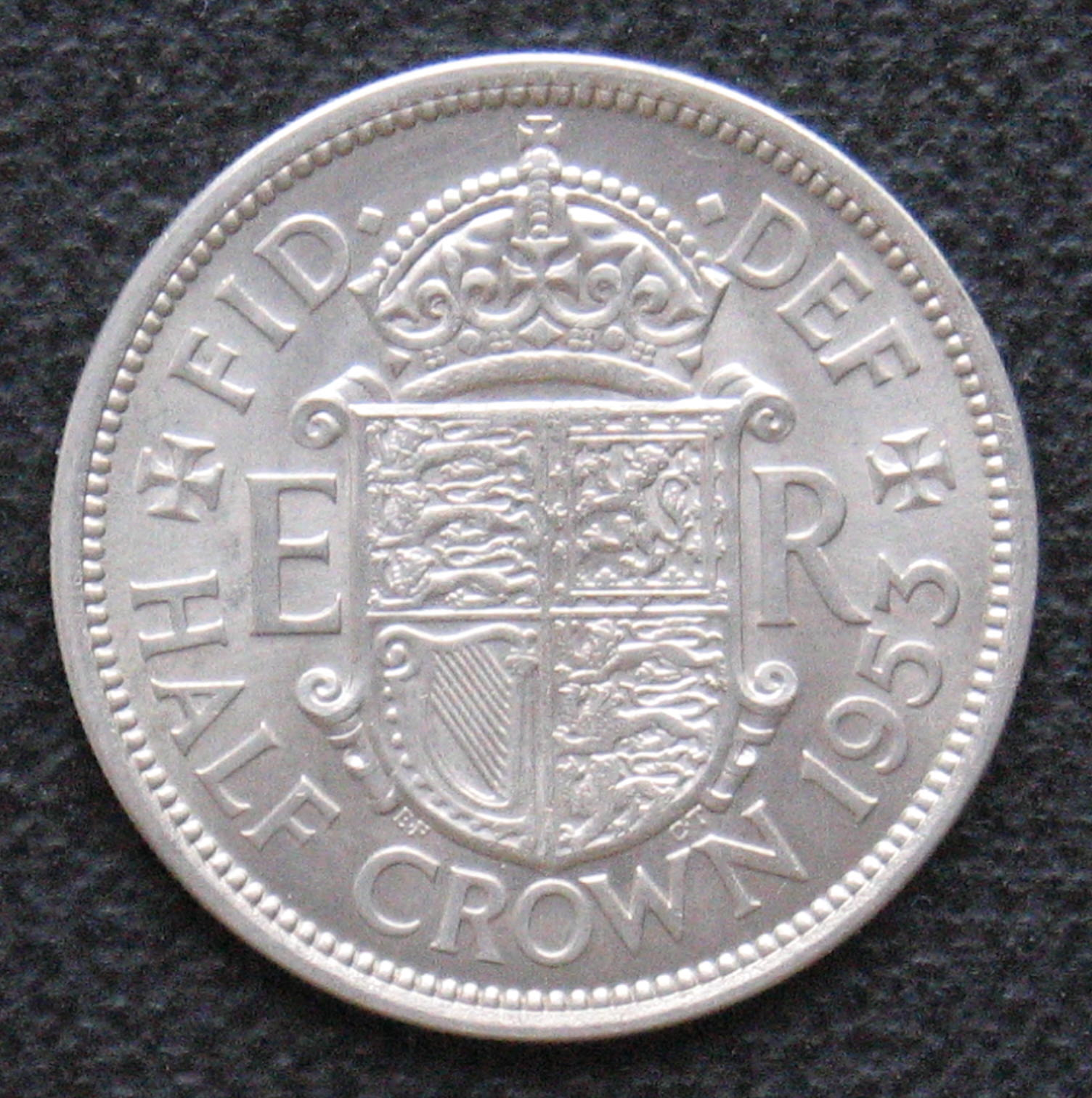
The reverse of the 1953, Elizabeth II, half crown

== See also ==
- Half crown (Irish coin)
