= Hill Godfrey Morgan =

Indian politician and businessman

Brigadier-General Sir Hill Godfrey Morgan KBE CMG DSO
- Born: 20 June 1862
- Died: 4 January 1923 (aged 60)

Sir Hill Godfrey Morgan, KBE, CMG, DSO (20 June 1862 – 4 January 1923) was a British Army officer.

After serving in the militia, he joined the regular army as part of 1st Battalion Gloucestershire Regiment in December 1883, five years later transferring to the Army Service Corps in December 1889 as a captain. For service in the Dongola Expeditionary Force of 1896–1898 he was mentioned in despatches, awarded the Order of Medjidie and made a Companion of the Distinguished Service Order (DSO). He also received the Order of Osmania and was again mentioned in despatches, both for his participation in the Nile Expedition and Relief of Khartoum. He had also been promoted to major, dated 1 April 1898.

He arrived in South Africa after the outbreak of the Second Boer War in late 1899 as Director of Supplies, serving in the 1899 operations in Natal, at the Relief of Ladysmith and in the battles of Colenso, Vaal Kranz, Tugela Heights, Pieters Hill, Laing’s Nek and Belfast. For his service he received a further four mentions in despatches, was promoted to the brevet rank of lieutenant colonel on 29 November 1900, and was created a Companion of the Order of the Bath (CB) in the October 1902 South Africa Honours list. While in South Africa, he had three of his horses riding to victory in the inaugural meeting at Pretoria's new racecourse

After the end of the war in June 1902, Morgan stayed in South Africa for several months, returning home on the SS Scot in November. In February 1905 he was promoted to the substantive rank of lieutenant colonel.

In November 1906 he retired from the army with the rank of lieutenant colonel, but was recalled to service in August 1914, after the British entry into World War I, as assistant director of supplies, Central Force. In January 1915 he was made administrative member, forage committee, effectively making him the commander of the Women's Forage Corps. By the war's end he had risen to his final rank of brigadier-general and gained the CMG, KBE in June 1919, and one further mention in despatches.
