= Women's Forage Corps =

British military organization from WW1

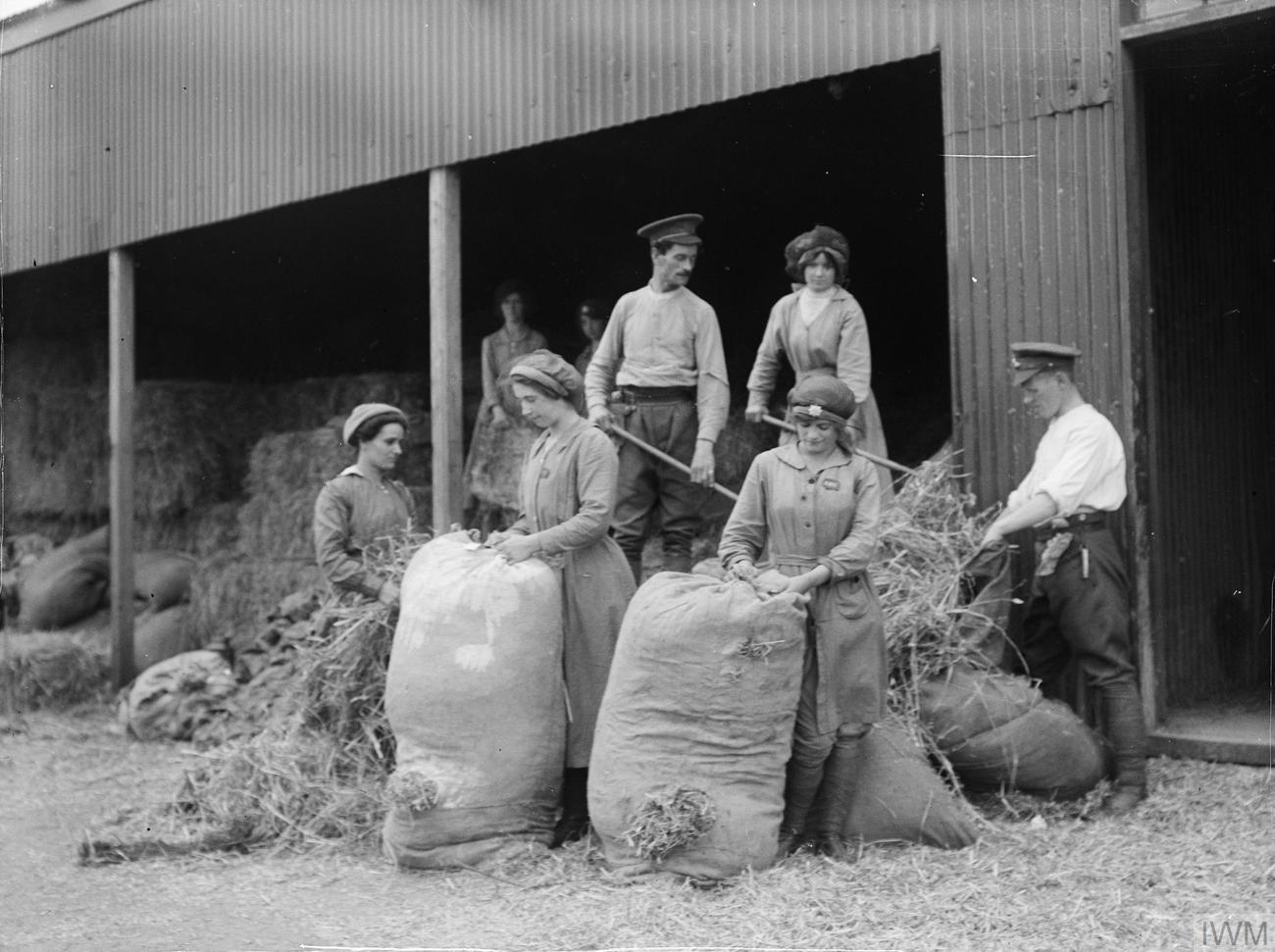
Women of the WFC bagging straw

The Women's Forage Corps (WFC) or Forage Corps (FC) was a British military organisation of World War I. Based at army camps and depots in the United Kingdom and working in gangs of six, its women assisted with matters relating to horse transport such as hay-making, forage, checking bales on arrival at railway stations, and supervising their loading, stable work, driving horse carts, winnowing, wire-stretching, and making and mending sacks and tarpaulin sheets. It also included Section Clerks for the related clerical work.

The foundations for the Corps were laid in 1915, though it only formally came into being on 1 March 1917 before being further formalised by an Army Order in early November 1918. Led by Mrs Atholl Stewart as Superintendent of Women, who reported to Brigadier-General Hill Godfrey Morgan, it consisted of civilian women (known as Industrial Members) but was under the control of the Army Service Corps. Below Stewart were (in descending order of seniority) Area Inspectors of Women, Assistant Superintendents, Deputy Superintendents, Forwarding Supervisors, Supervisors of Women Labour, Deputy Assistant Supervisors, and Gang Supervisors.

Largely drawn from among women servants but also including some women of independent means with their own horses, normal members earned an average of 26 to 30 shillings a week by 1919, drawing army rations and sometimes with a caravan (for messing rather than accommodation) and cook assigned to their gang as a mess. Their uniform consisted of gaiters, haversack, dark green breeches, hats, jerseys, khaki overcoats, overalls, and black boots, with brass shoulder insignia of the initials "FC". Higher ranks wore a khaki tunic and shirt, shoulder rank badges, shoulder "FC" insignia, and a brass badge showing "FC" within the eight-pointed star of the Royal Army Service Corps.

The WFC numbered 8,000 by 1917, though this had dropped to about 6,000 by 1919. It also contributed to the formation of the Women's Land Army, also in 1917, though the WFC itself survived until 1920.
