= Siege of Khartoum =

1884–85 Mahdist siege in Sudan

- Part of the Mahdist War
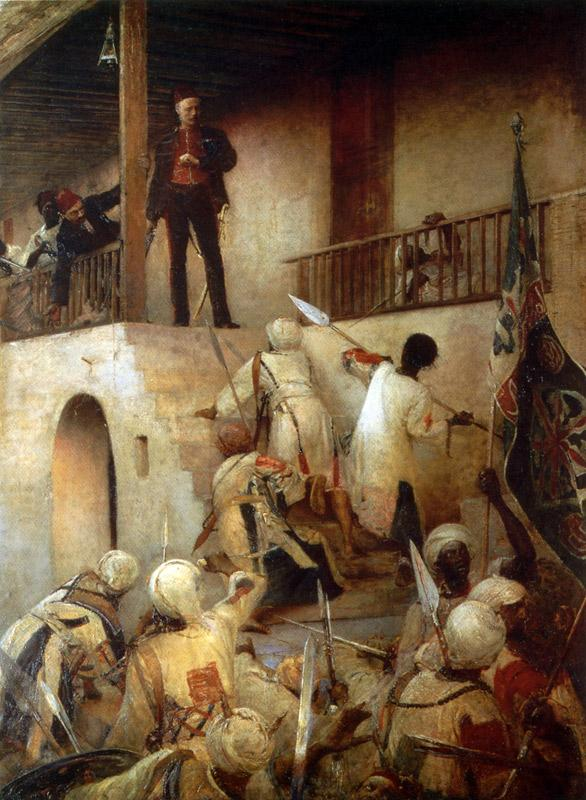
- Portrayal of Gordon's death by George W. Joy
Date	13 March 1884 – 26 January 1885
Location	Khartoum, Sudan 15.61°N 32.53°E
Result	Mahdist victory
Territorial changes	Fall of Turco-Egyptian Sudan; Temporary withdrawal of British forces from Sudan

Belligerents
Mahdist State	Khedivate of Egypt

Commanders and leaders
Muhammad Ahmad	Charles Gordon †

Strength
30,000 to 50,000 troops	7,000 troops 9 gunboats

Casualties and losses
Small	Entire force destroyed
- ~4,000 civilians dead, many others enslaved

The siege of Khartoum (also known as the battle of Khartoum or fall of Khartoum) took place from 13 March 1884 to 26 January 1885. Sudanese Mahdist forces captured the city of Khartoum, Sudan, from its Egyptian garrison, thereby gaining control over the whole of Turco-Egyptian Sudan.

Egypt had conquered Sudan in 1820, but had itself come under British domination in 1882. In 1881, the Mahdist War began in Sudan, led by Muhammad Ahmad who claimed to be the Mahdi. The Egyptian Army was unable to suppress the revolt, being defeated in several battles and retreating to their garrisons. The British refused to send a military force to the area, instead appointing Charles George Gordon as Governor-General of Sudan, with orders to evacuate Khartoum and the other garrisons. Gordon arrived in Khartoum in February 1884, where he found it impossible to reach the other garrisons which were already besieged. Rather than evacuating immediately, Gordon began to fortify the city, which was cut off when the local tribes switched their support to the Mahdi. Approximately 7,000 Egyptian troops and 27,000 (mostly Sudanese) civilians were besieged in Khartoum by 30,000 Mahdist troops, rising to 50,000 by the end of the siege.

Attempts by the defenders to break out of the city failed. Food supplies began to run out; they had been expected to last six months, but the siege went on for ten, so the garrison and civilian population began to starve. After months of public pressure, the British government reluctantly agreed to send troops to relieve the siege. When the relief column began to approach the city, the Mahdists launched a night assault on Khartoum. They broke through the defences and killed the entire garrison, including Gordon. A further 4,000 male civilians were killed, while many women and children were enslaved. The relief expedition arrived two days later; realising they were too late, they withdrew from Sudan. The Mahdi then founded a religious state in Sudan, the Mahdiyah, which would last for fourteen years.

== Background ==
=== Strategic situation ===
The Khedivate of Egypt was nominally a vassal state of the Ottoman Empire, but came under British military occupation during the 1882 Anglo-Egyptian War, making it a de facto British protectorate. Egypt was mostly left to govern itself under the Khedive, though its finances remained under a system of dual control that had begun in the 1870s. The British regarded Egypt's possession of Sudan as a domestic matter.

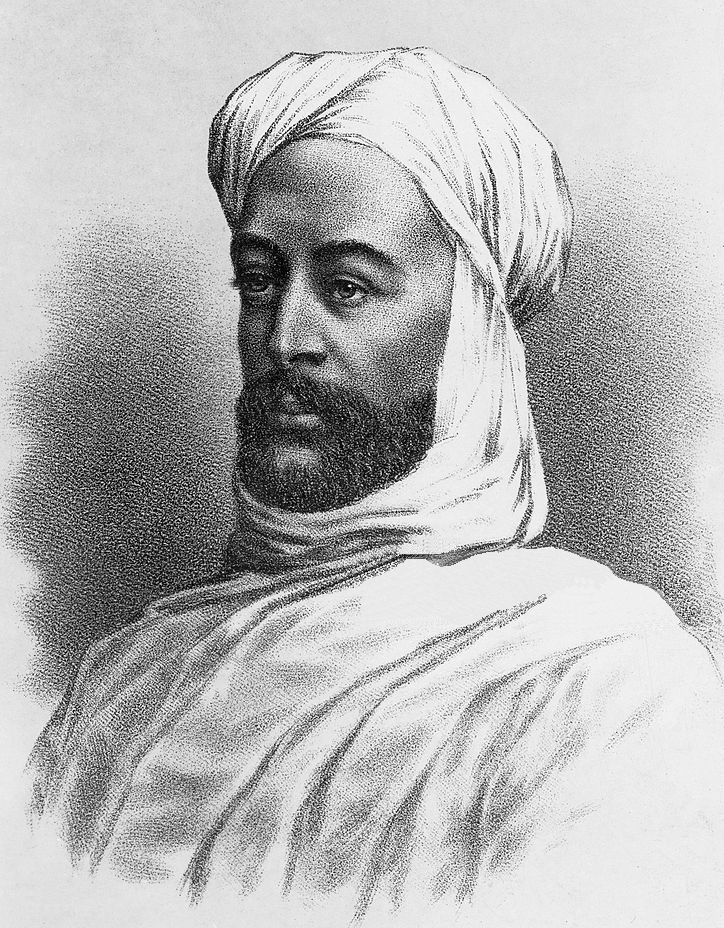
Muhammad Ahmad, the self-proclaimed Mahdi

A revolt had begun in Sudan in 1881, when Muhammad Ahmad claimed to be the mahdi – the redeemer of Islam prophesied in the hadith scriptures. This Mahdist revolt was supported by many in Sudan, both for religious reasons and due to a desire for independence from Egypt.

The Egyptian Army attempted to suppress the revolt, but were defeated by the Mahdists in November 1883 at the Battle of El Obeid. The Mahdi's forces captured the Egyptians' equipment and overran large parts of Sudan, including Darfur and Kordofan. However Egypt still maintained several strong garrisons in Sudan, including at Khartoum.

=== Appointment of Gordon ===
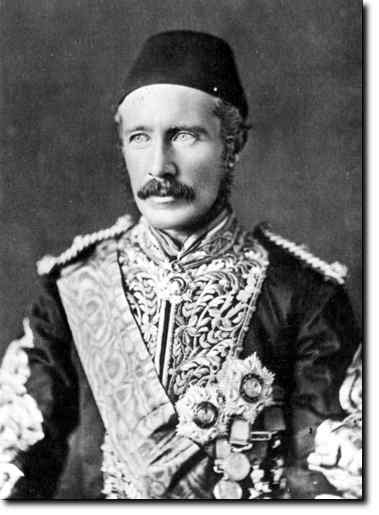
Charles Gordon in Egyptian military uniform

The Egyptian defeat at El Obeid brought the Mahdi Revolt to the attention of the British government and public. The British Prime Minister, William Gladstone, and his War Secretary, Lord Hartington, did not want British troops to become involved in Sudan. If Egypt fought the war itself, they were concerned that the expense would prevent Egypt from paying the interest on its extensive debts to Britain (and France). The British put pressure on the Egyptian government to evacuate all their garrisons in Sudan, abandoning it to the Mahdists. The British soldier Major-General Charles George Gordon, a former Governor-General of Sudan (1876–1879), was re-appointed to that post, with orders to conduct the evacuation.

Gordon's views on Sudan were radically different from Gladstone's: Gordon felt that the Mahdi's rebellion had to be defeated before it gained control of the whole of Sudan. The Mahdi claimed dominion over the entire Islamic world, which led Gordon to believe that the revolt would not end with control of Sudan, but would attempt to conquer Egypt and perhaps the wider region. Gordon was also concerned by the fragility of the Egyptian army, which had suffered several defeats by the Sudanese. Gordon favoured a more aggressive policy in Sudan, as did the imperialist author Sir Samuel Baker and Sir Garnet Wolseley, who had commanded British forces in the 1882 war. Gordon published his views on Sudan in The Times in January 1884.

Despite this, Gordon was commanded to evacuate Sudan, which he agreed to do. He was given funds of £100,000 in credit and was promised "all support and cooperation in their power" by the British and Egyptian authorities. On his way to Khartoum with his assistant, Colonel John Stewart, Gordon stopped in the town of Berber, Sudan to address an assembly of tribal chiefs. There he made a major mistake, by revealing that the Egyptian government planned to withdraw their troops from Sudan. The tribesmen became worried by this news, which caused their loyalty to waver.

=== Gordon's preparations ===
Gordon arrived at Khartoum on 18 February 1884, finding it was safely occupied by a garrison of 7,000 Egyptian troops and 27,000 civilians. However three smaller garrisons, at Sennar, Tokar and Sinkat, were under siege by the Mahdists. Rather than evacuating Khartoum immediately, Gordon declared his intention to extricate the other garrisons, and set about administering Sudan. His first actions were to reverse several policies introduced by the Egyptians since he had last been Governor-General five years earlier: arbitrary imprisonments were cancelled, torture was halted and its instruments were destroyed, and taxes were remitted. To enlist the support of the population, Gordon re-legalised slavery in Sudan, despite having (unsuccessfully) attempted to abolish it in his previous term. This decision was popular in Khartoum, but caused controversy in Britain.

Seeking to bolster Khartoum's defences, Gordon then attempted to secure reinforcements. He requested a regiment of Turkish soldiers from the Ottomans, who were still the nominal overlords, which was rebuffed. He then asked the British for a unit of Muslim Indian troops, and later for 200 native British soldiers. These were also refused by the Gladstone cabinet, which was still intent upon evacuation and adamant they would make no military intervention in Sudan.

Gordon began to resent the government's policy, and his telegrams to the British office in Cairo became more bitter. He declared himself honour-bound to rescue the garrisons and defend the Sudanese in Khartoum; it is unclear whether this was a deliberate attempt to delay the evacuation (or avoid it entirely). On 8 April he wrote: "I leave you with the indelible disgrace of abandoning the garrisons" and added that such a course would be "the climax of meanness".

== Battle ==
=== Siege begins ===
Map of Khartoum during the siege

Knowing that the Mahdists were closing in, Gordon ordered the strengthening of the fortifications around Khartoum. The city was protected to the north by the Blue Nile and to the west by the White Nile. To defend the river banks, he formed a flotilla of gunboats from nine small paddle-wheel steamers, which had been used for communication along the river, by fitting them with guns and metal plates for armour. In the southern part of the town, which faced the open desert, he prepared an elaborate system of trenches, makeshift Fougasse-type land mines, and wire entanglements. The surrounding country was controlled by the Shagia tribe, which were thought to be hostile to the Mahdi.

On 16 March Gordon launched an unsuccessful sortie from Khartoum, with 200 Egyptian troops dying in the fighting. By early April 1884, the tribes north of Khartoum had risen in support of the Mahdi, including those Gordon had met at Berber. The tribesmen intercepted river traffic on the Nile and cut the telegraph cables to Cairo. Communications were not entirely halted, as individual messengers could still get through, but this effectively began the siege of Khartoum. The city could rely only on its own food stores, which were expected to last five or six months. By this time, the combined forces besieging Khartoum and the other garrisons were over 30,000 men.

From April onwards, Khartoum was cut off. With no supply of money to pay the troops or facilitate trade of food, Gordon used his credit to issue a series of promissory notes, a form of siege money. Communication with Cairo was maintained through couriers, who took several days to make the trip. Gordon also contacted the Mahdi, who rejected his attempts to negotiate a peaceful evacuation. As the siege dragged on, food stores dwindled and starvation began to set in, for both the garrison and the civilian population.

In September, the besieged forces in Khartoum made an attempt to reach the garrison at Sennar; the expedition made it out of the siege lines but was defeated by the Mahdists at Al Aylafuh, with the loss of 800 garrison troops. A separate attempt to send a steamboat along the Nile to Cairo also failed; all the passengers were killed, including Colonel Stewart. Stewart had been carrying letters from Gordon, which were captured and revealed the worsening situation inside Khartoum. By the end of the month, the Mahdi moved most of his army to Khartoum, away from the outlying garrisons, more than doubling the number around the city. On 10 September 1884, the civilian population inside Khartoum was about 34,000.

=== Relief expedition ===
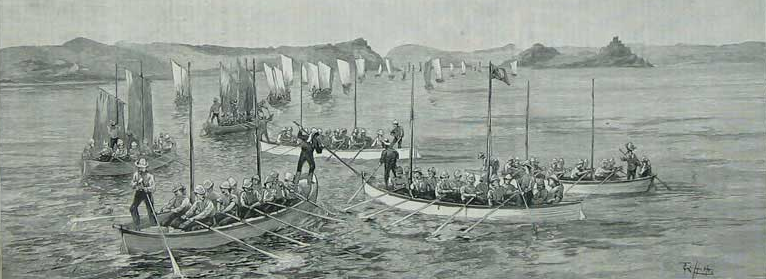
The Nile Expedition for the relief of Gordon

Gordon's plight excited great concern in the British press, and even Queen Victoria intervened on his behalf. The government ordered Gordon to return to Cairo, alone if necessary, but he refused, saying he would not abandon the city. In July 1884, Gladstone reluctantly agreed to send an expedition to relieve Khartoum. The relief force, 9,000 British troops led by Sir Garnet Wolseley, took several months to organise. The troops had to be carried on boats up the Nile to reach Khartoum. Navigators from Canada, mainly French-Canadian and Indigenous woodworkers, were brought in to operate the boats. They did not enter Sudan until January 1885.

By then the situation in Khartoum had become desperate. Food supplies had been expected to last six months, but the siege had gone on for ten months. With supplies running low, many inhabitants died of hunger, and the defenders' morale plummeted.

Informed of the dire situation in Khartoum, Wolseley was forced to divide his forces. While the main body would continue to advance by river to Abu Hamed, the Desert Column would strike from Korti, across the Bayuda Desert to Mettema where they would link with Gordon's steamboats awaiting them.

As they advanced toward Mettema, the Desert Column was attacked at the Battle of Abu Klea on 17 January. Although the Mahdists managed to break their infantry square, the British troops recovered and repelled the attack. Two days later, the relief force was attacked again at the Battle of Abu Kru but were able to drive off the Mahdists. The Mahdi, aware of the British advance, decided to assault Khartoum before they could arrive.

=== Fall of Khartoum ===
On the night of 25–26 January an estimated 50,000 Mahdists attacked the city wall just before midnight. The Mahdists took advantage of the seasonally low level of the Nile, which allowed them to ford the river on foot. The details of the final assault are unclear, but hearsay accounts were that by 3:30 am, the Mahdists had outflanked the city wall where it met the Nile. Meanwhile, another force, led by Al Nujumi, broke down the Massalamieh Gate, despite taking casualties from the land mines and barbed wire obstacles laid out by Gordon's men. The defending garrison, weakened by starvation and low morale, offered only patchy resistance. Within a few hours, the entire garrison was killed, as were 4,000 of the town's male inhabitants. Many women and children were enslaved by the victorious Mahdists.

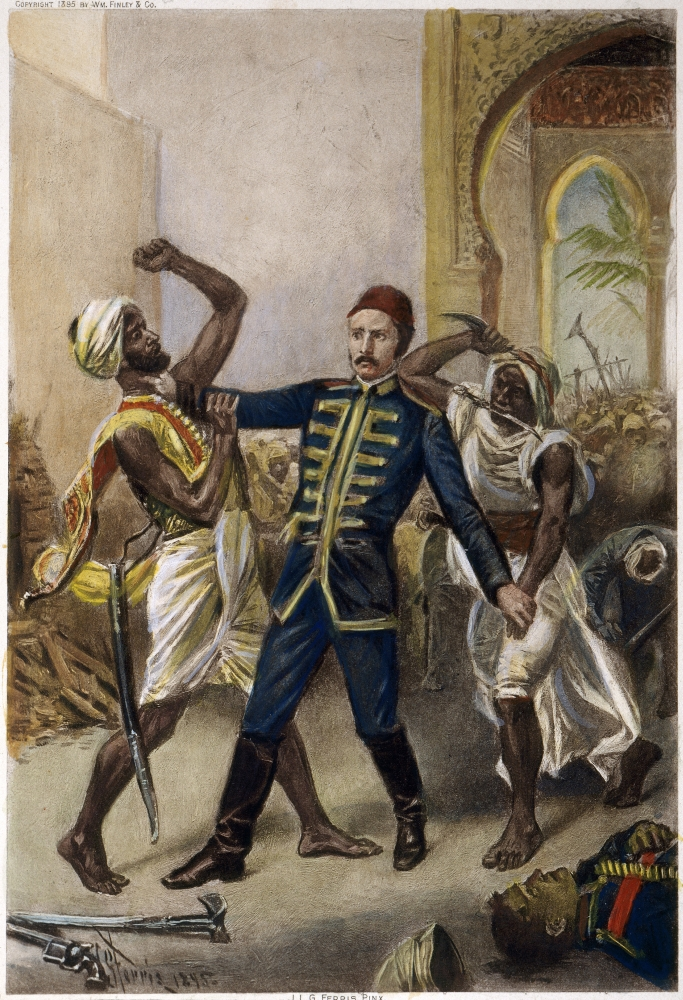
Death of General Gordon at Khartoum

Accounts differ as to how Gordon was killed. According to one version, when Mahdist troops broke into the governor's palace, Gordon came outside in full uniform and disdained to fight; he was then killed with a spear, despite orders from the Mahdi to capture Gordon alive. In another version, Gordon was recognised by Mahdists while attempting to reach the neutral Austrian consulate in the city, who shot him dead in the street.

The most detailed account of his death was given by his servant Khaleel Aga Orphali, when debriefed by the British in 1898 (13 years later). According to Orphali, Gordon died fighting on the stairs leading from the first to the ground floor of the west wing of the palace. Gordon was seriously wounded by a spear that hit him in the left shoulder, but continued fighting with Orphali beside him. Orphali stated that:

With his life's blood pouring from his breast [...] he fought his way step by step, kicking from his path the wounded and dead dervishes [...] and as he was passing through the doorway leading into the courtyard, another concealed dervish almost severed his right leg with a single blow.

Orphali claimed he was then knocked unconscious, waking unharmed several hours later to find Gordon's decapitated body near to him.

However he died, Gordon's head was taken to the Mahdi's headquarters at Omdurman (opposite Khartoum on the other side of the White Nile). There it was shown to Rudolf Carl von Slatin, a prisoner of the Mahdi who had worked for Gordon during his first term in Sudan, who verified it was Gordon's. The head was then brought to the Mahdi. According to some sources, the rest of Gordon's body was dumped in the Nile.

== Aftermath ==
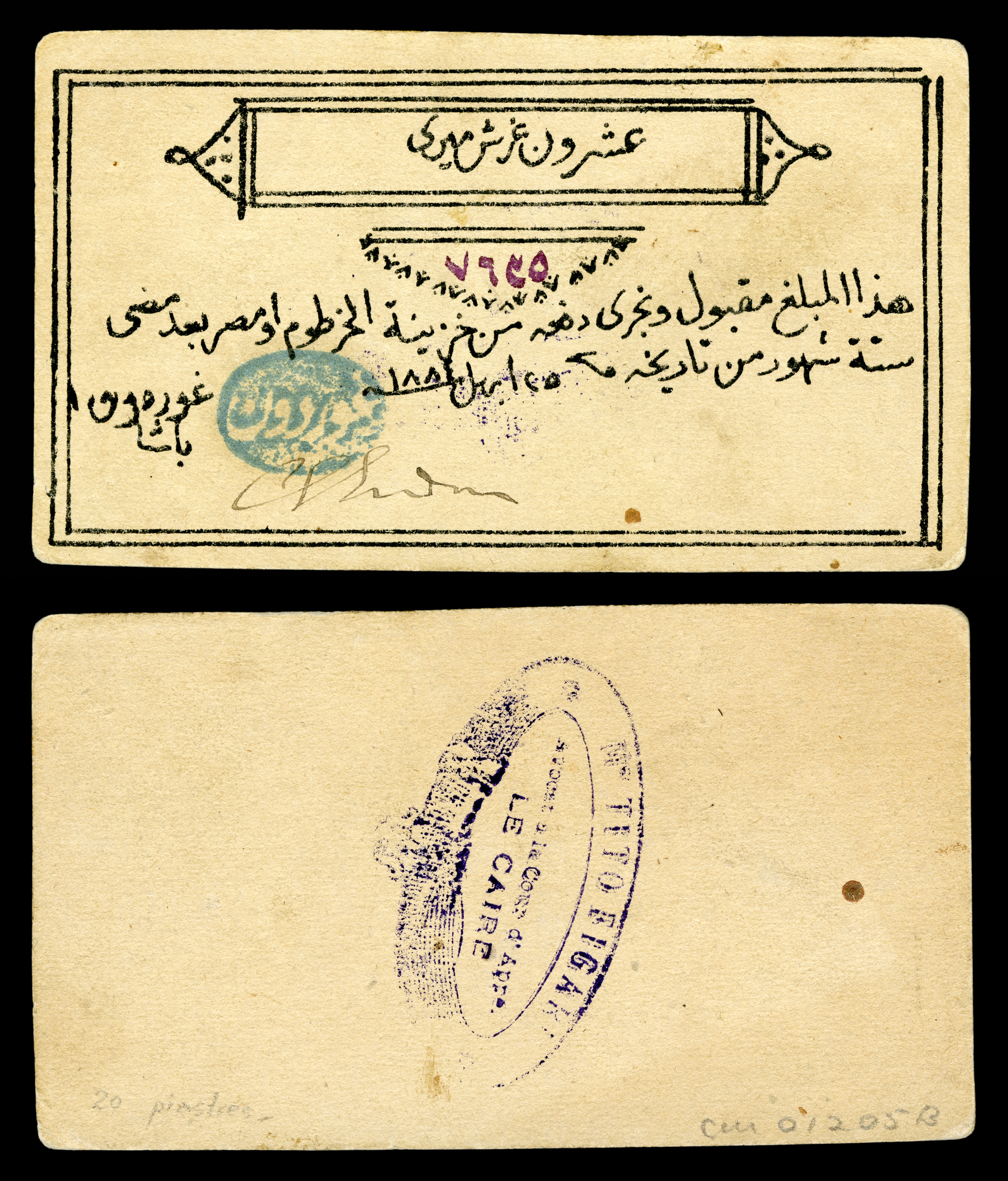
20 piastre promissory note issued and hand-signed by Gen. Gordon during the Siege of Khartoum (26 April 1884)

A small part of the relief expedition led by Colonel Charles William Wilson consisting of 240 British and native troops including 24 men from the Royal Sussex Regiment that were embarked on two of Gordon's steamboats – the Bordein and the Talahawiyeh – arrived within sight of Khartoum two days after it fell. After discovering that they were too late, the surviving British and Egyptian troops withdrew. The Mahdi was left in control of the entire country, with the exceptions of the city of Suakin on the Red Sea coast and the Nile town of Wadi Halfa on the Sudan-Egypt border, which were garrisoned by the Anglo-Egyptian force.

After his victory, Muhammad Ahmad became the ruler of most parts of what is now Sudan and South Sudan. He established a religious state, the Mahdiyah, but died shortly afterwards in June 1885, possibly from typhoid. The state he founded passed to Abdallahi ibn Muhammad, his chosen successor.

In the immediate aftermath of the Mahdist victory, the British press blamed Gordon's death on Gladstone, who was accused of being excessively slow to send relief to Khartoum. Gladstone had never wanted to get involved in Sudan and felt some sympathy for those Sudanese who sought to end Egyptian colonial rule. He declared in the House of Commons: "Yes, those people are struggling to be free, and they are rightly struggling to be free". Gordon's failure to conduct an immediate evacuation had not endeared him to Gladstone's government. However among the British public, Gordon was seen as a martyr and a hero. Gladstone was rebuked by Queen Victoria in a telegram, which was leaked to the public. The public outcry over Sudan soon weakened, firstly when press sensationalism of the events began to diminish, and secondly when the government announced that the war in Sudan had cost Britain £11.5 million (equivalent to £1.3 billion in 2025) from its military budget. Gladstone's government fell in June 1885; he regained power in December following the 1885 UK election, but lost it again in another election in 1886.

Fighting continued between Egypt and the Mahdists over the following years. Complex international events led to further European expansion into Africa, compelling the British to take a more active role in the conflict. The Anglo-Egyptian forces steadily regained their control over Sudan. In 1896, an expedition led by Herbert Kitchener (who had sworn to avenge Gordon) was sent to reconquer the whole country. On 2 September 1898, Kitchener's troops defeated the largest Mahdist army at the Battle of Omdurman. Two days later, a memorial service for Gordon was held in front of the ruins of the palace where he had died. Fourteen years after the Mahdist capture of Khartoum, the Mahdist Revolt was finally extinguished at the Battle of Umm Diwaykarat in November 1899.

== Cultural depictions ==
- Zoltan Korda's 1939 film The Four Feathers (one of several films of that name on the same events) was based on A. E. W. Mason's 1902 adventure novel set against the background of the Mahdist War and the siege of Khartoum.
- These events are depicted in Basil Dearden's 1966 film Khartoum, with Charlton Heston as General Gordon and Laurence Olivier as Muhammad Ahmad.
- The siege of Khartoum is the setting for Wilbur Smith's novel The Triumph of the Sun (2005) and David Gibbins's Pharaoh (2013).
- G. A. Henty wrote a young adults' novel about the siege called The Dash for Khartoum (1892). It has been reissued and is available to read free online at Project Gutenberg.
- Henryk Sienkiewicz, Polish writer and Nobel Prize winner, set his novel In Desert and Wilderness (1923) in Sudan during Mahdi's rebellion, which is integral to the plot.
- Gillian Slovo based her novel An Honourable Man (2012) on the established narrative of General Gordon's last days in Khartoum.
