= Patamar =

Type of Indian dhow (sailboat)

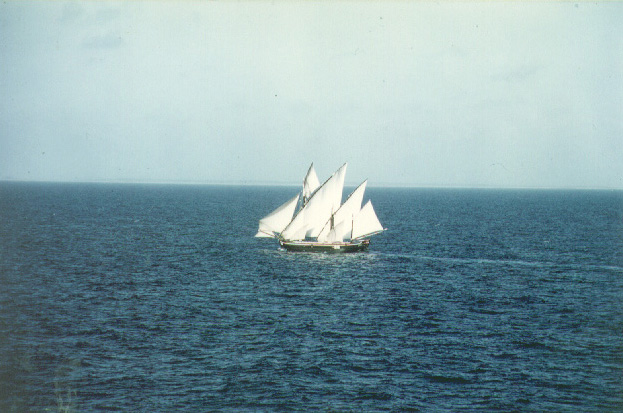
A Patamar

The Patamar (Portuguese), (English: Pattamar, Patimar, French: Patemar, Patmar, Malayalam: Pathemari), is a type of Indian Dhow. It was traditionally used in the western coast of the Indian subcontinent as a cabotage vessel between Gujarat and Ceylon, usually for the transport of rice. Some can still be seen on the Malabar Coast.

== Description ==
Patamar are commonly between 200 and 300 tons in weight and are rigged with one to three masts bearing lateen sails. They feature a peculiarly-shaped keel with a club-shaped end of the bow. The wide stern of the average Patamar is somewhat similar to the Baghlah, Sambuk and Kotiya but without a poop deck, which is replaced by a bamboo deck house thatched with coconut palm leaf.

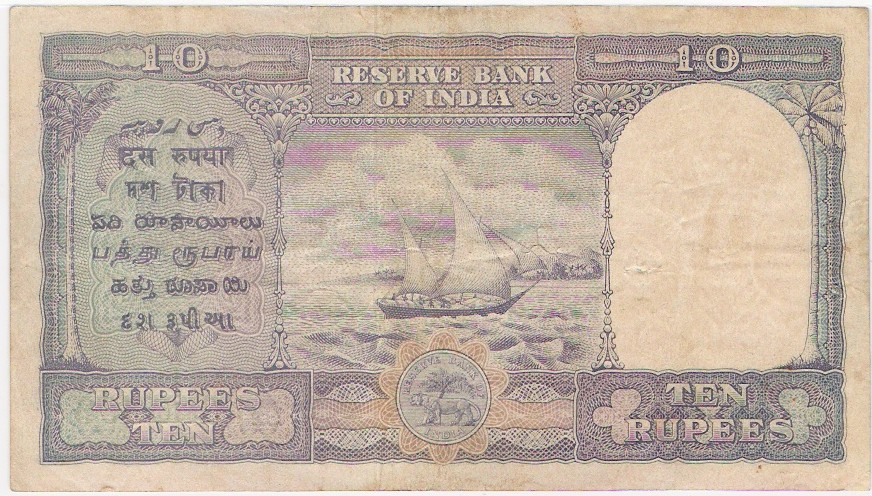
Pattamar on a 10 Indian rupee note

A pattamar in full sail appeared on the reverse of the 10 Indian rupee banknotes that preceded the Mahatma Gandhi Series.

== History ==
In 1806, Lieutenant de vaisseau Pierre Bouvet observed the indigenous ships of the Patamar type while a prisoner in Bombay. Back in Isle de France (now Mauritius), Bouvet suggested the use of armed Patamars to General Decaen, Governor General of the French possessions in the East Indies, to conduct reconnaissance and raids on the British. He was able to have Entreprenant built in 1807 and sailed her on a privateering cruise.

== See also ==
- Dhow Uru (boat)
