= Fateh Al-Khayr =

Kuwaiti museum ship

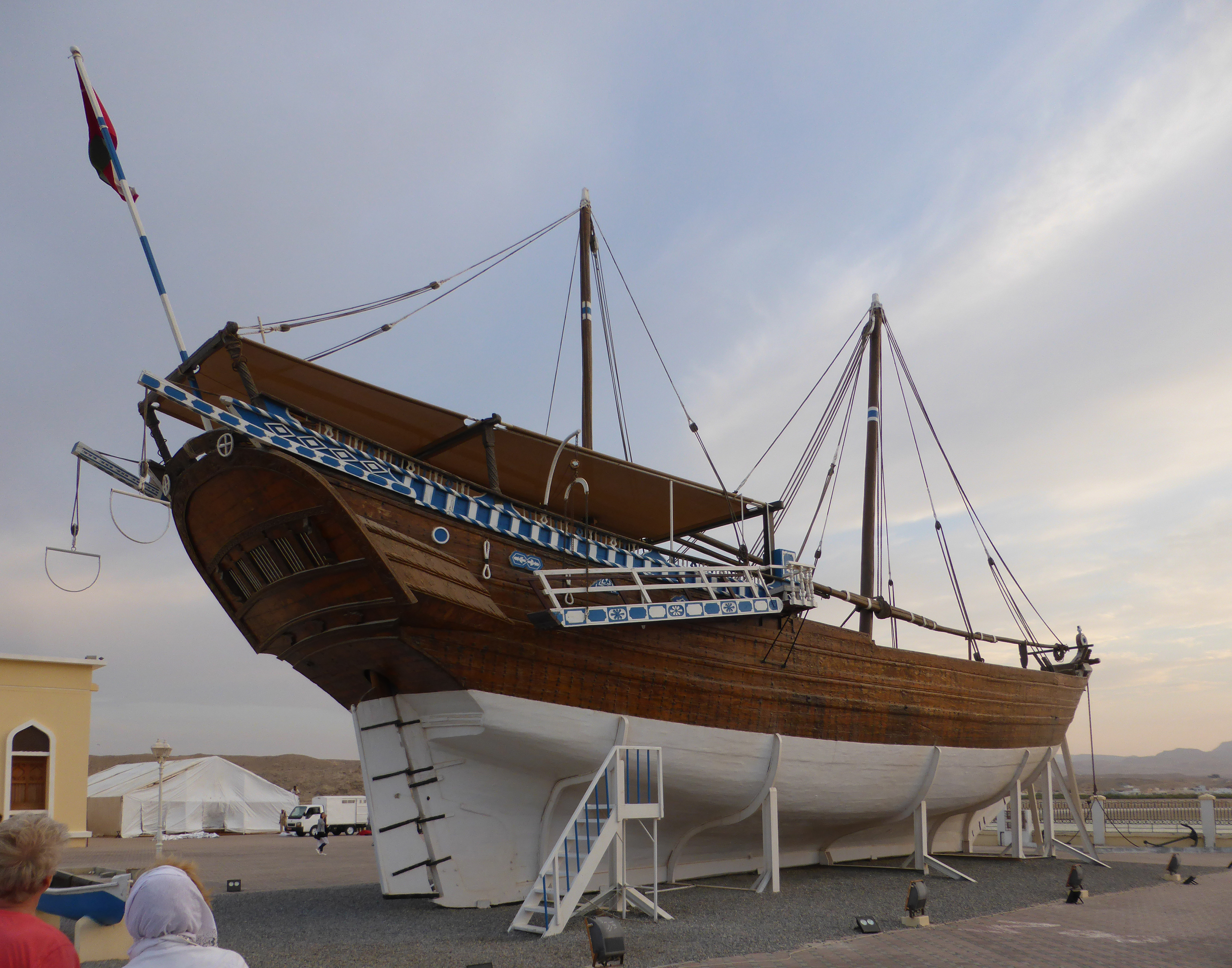
- This photo shows the Ghanjah in Sur, Oman.

History
- Builder: Ali Abdul Rassol
- Launched: 1938
- Status: museum ship

The Fateh Al-Khayr (Arabic: فاتح الخير) is a 226-ton dhow preserved as a museum ship in Kuwait at Kuwait Scientific Center. Built in 1938 in Kuwait by Ali Abdul Rassol for Mohamed Al-Ghanim and Thunayan Al-Ghanim, it is the only surviving Kuwaiti-built sailing ship of the country's pre-oil era. Though the Fateh Al-Khayr shares its name with a similar museum ship in Oman, the Omani ship is a type of dhow called a Ghanjah, and the Kuwaiti ship is a variant called a boum. The photo of this article shows the Ghanjah in Oman.

After being used for long-distance voyages to Africa, the Kuwaiti ship was sold in 1952 to an Iranian captain who used it for shipping within the Persian Gulf. In 1994, it was discovered by Kuwaiti maritime historian Yacoub al-Hijji, who organized its purchase and restoration. At the time, it was thought that the only surviving Kuwaiti-built boum had been destroyed during the Gulf War. After two years of work, the Fateh Al-Khayr was unveiled to the public and installed at the museum in Kuwait.

== See also ==
- Al-Hashemi-II
