= Shu'ai =

Sailing vessel

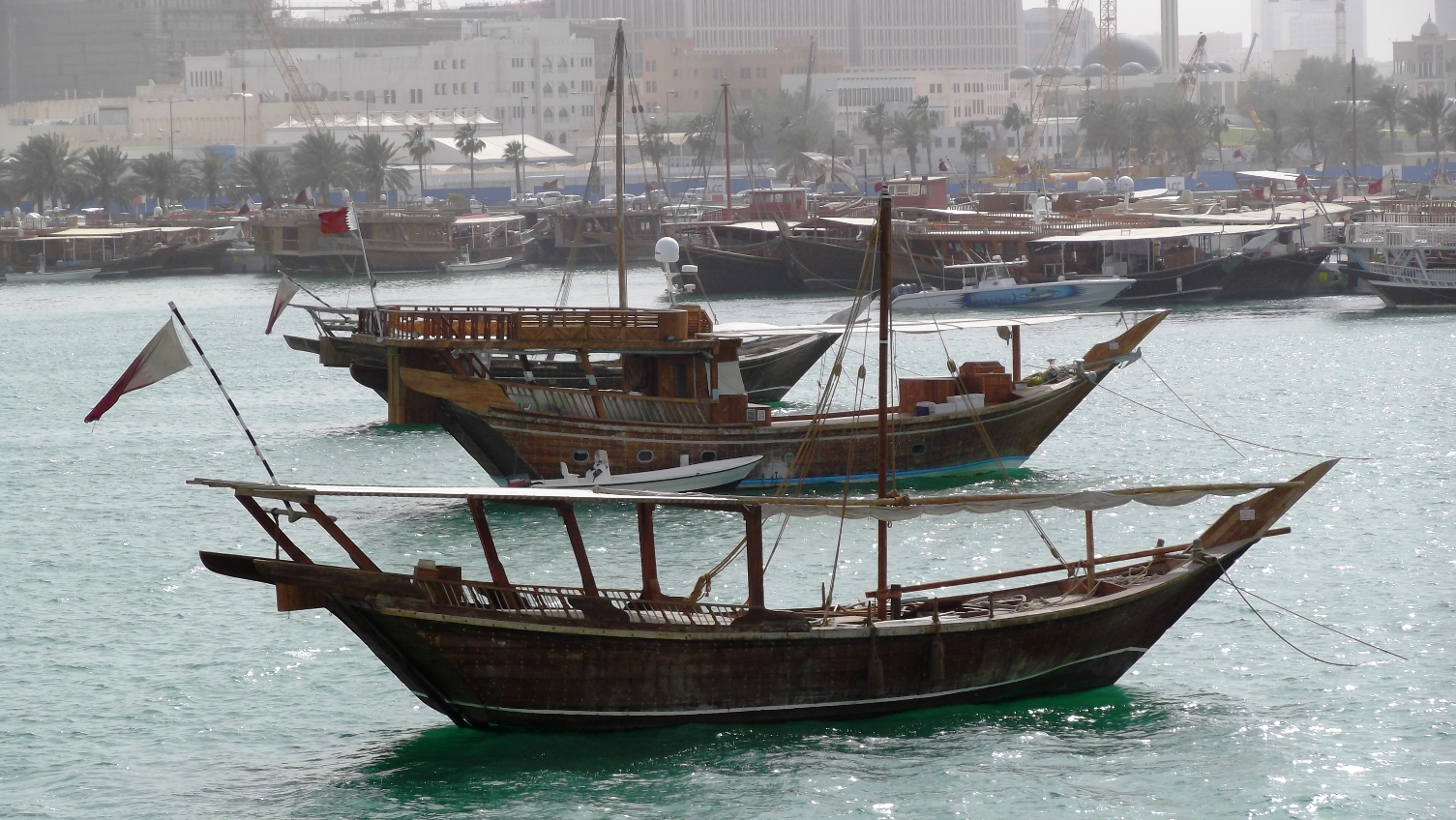
Fishermen's Shu’ai moored at Doha

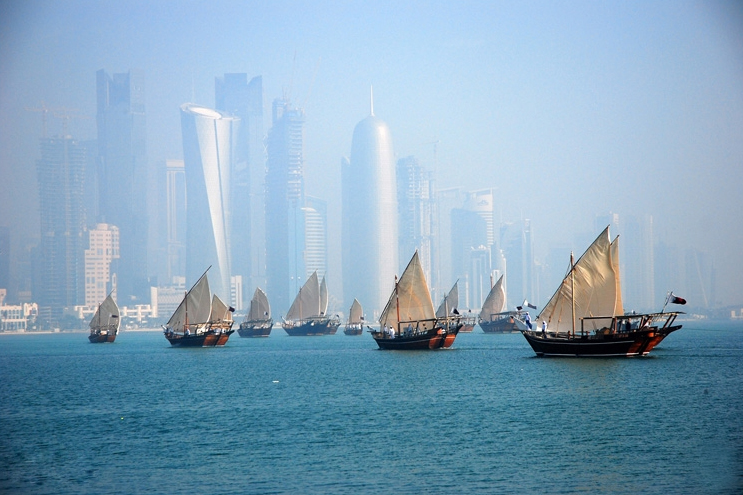
Shu’ai at dhow parade during Qatar National Day.

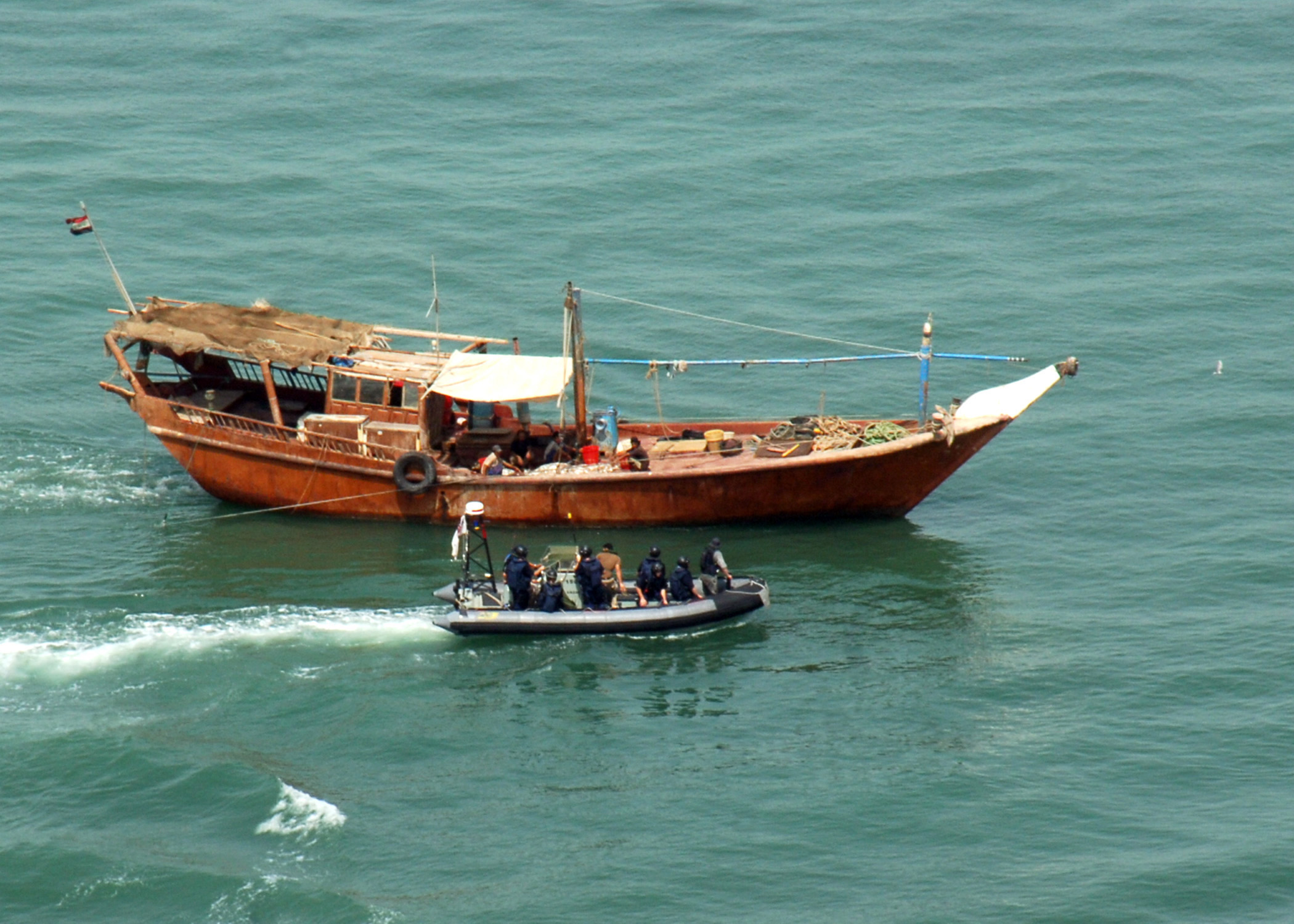
Shu’ai in the Persian Gulf

A Shu’ai, Shu’i or Shuw'i (Arabic: شوعي) is a small or medium-sized dhow, a traditional Arabic sailing vessel. This type of dhow is built low with a high quarterdeck and has one or two masts with lateen sails. A general purpose coastal boat, the shu’ai is one of the smaller-size dhow of Persian Gulf.

Formerly Shu’ai was the most common dhow in the Persian Gulf used for fishing as well as for coastal trade. Some Shu'ai have been converted into motorboats after being fitted with engines instead of sails, especially in the Persian Gulf area.

== See also ==
- Dhow
- Baghlah
- Batil (ship)
- Beden
- Boom (ship)
- Ghanjah
- Sambuk

== Bibliography ==
- Agius, Dionisius A (2008), Classic Ships of Islam: From Mesopotamia to the Indian Ocean, Brill, ISBN 978-90-0415863-4.
- Hawkins, Clifford W. (1977). The Dhow: An Illustrated History Of The Dhow And Its World. Nautical Publishing Co. Ltd, ISBN 978-0245526558
- Hourani, George F. (1995). Arab Seafaring in the Indian Ocean in Ancient and Early Medieval Times. Princeton: Princeton University Press. ISBN 9780691000329
