= Kuwait Scientific Center =

Coordinates: 29.349700°N 48.089559°E

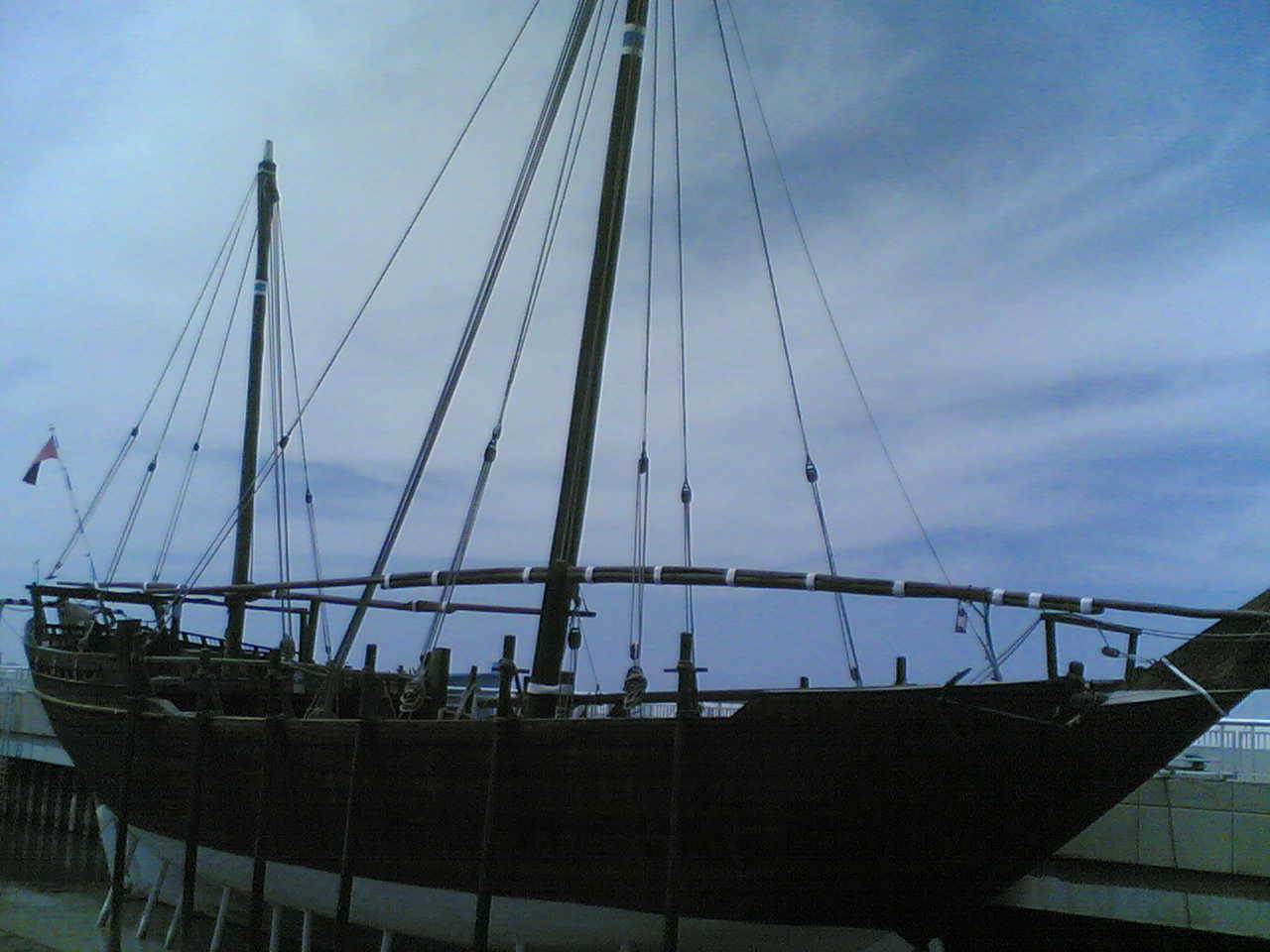
An image of a Kuwaiti Bǒm

The Scientific Center of Kuwait, located in Salmiya, Kuwait, serves as a center for environmental education in the Persian Gulf region. KSC spans over 80,000 square meters with the building covering over 18,000 square meters. The center also houses the largest aquarium in the Middle East after Dubai, holding over 100 different species of animals. Along with the aquarium, it also contains an IMAX theatre, a harbor of historic dhows, and a gift shop among other contents.

== Facilities ==
The Scientific Center has three main sections: the Mijbil Almutawa Aquarium, Discovery Place, and IMAX theater.

== See also ==
- Fateh Al-Khayr
