= Uru (boat) =

Type of boat from Kerala, India

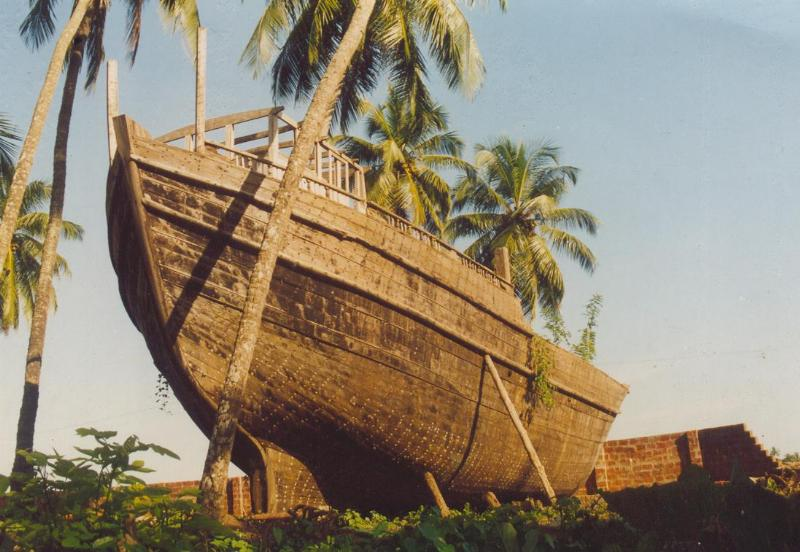
Uru is a boat with an ancient design

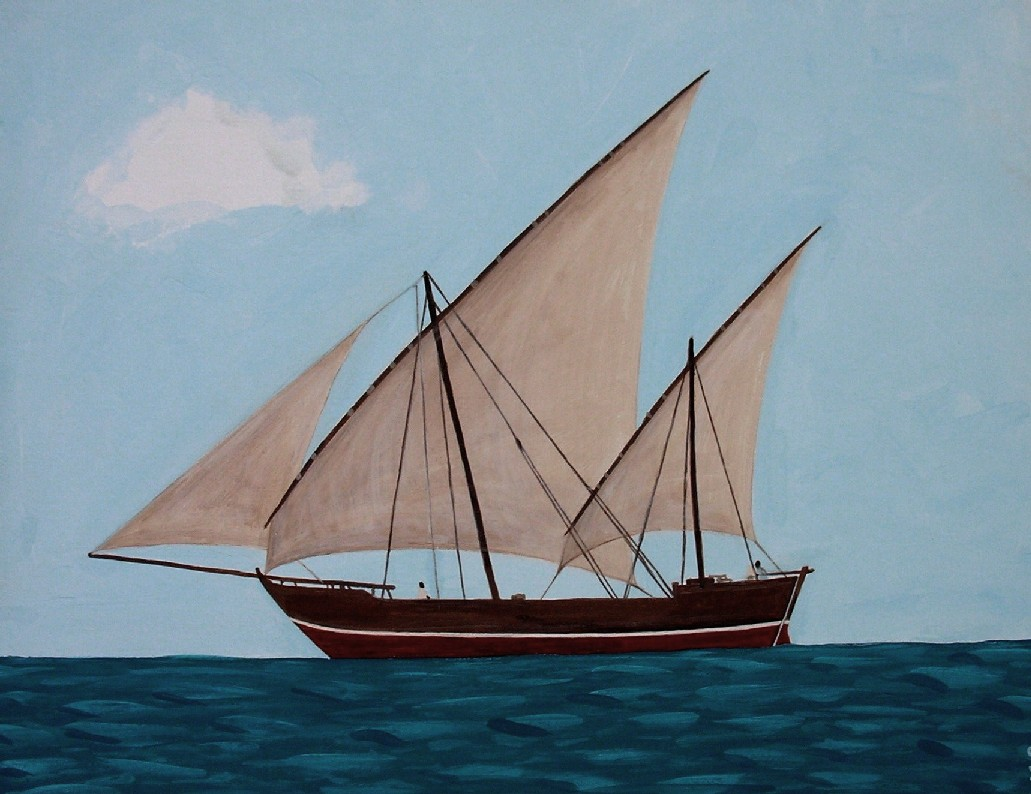
This boom had been originally built in Beypore, Kerala, India

Uru, also known as Fat Boat in English, is a type of dhow made in Beypore, Kerala, in the southwestern coast of India.

This type of boat has been used by the Arabs since ancient times as trading vessels, and even now, urus are being manufactured and exported to Arab nations from Beypore. These boats used to be built of several types of wood, the main one being teak. The teak was taken from Nilambur forests in earlier times, but now imported Malaysian teak is used. A couple of boat-building yards can still be found near the Beypore port.

== History ==
The art of uru making in Beypore, on the northern coast of Kerala, is as old as the beginnings of India’s maritime trade with Mesopotamia. Islands dotting the Chaliyar river have continued the tradition for over a millennium.

In the 1970s, the uru ship building industry faced declining sales and was forced to stop construction in the 1980s due to a lack of demand. The boat building industry in Beypore relied heavily on teak wood which was sourced from the Nilambur forest in Kerala. Deforestation and increased government protections on the Nilambur forest resulted in a dwindling supply and increased costs, forcing ship building yards in Beypore to source their teak from Malaysia instead. Additionally, strict import and export laws on wood made it difficult to supply the spare parts needed to maintain and repair urus abroad. Despite their impressive build quality, the many wooden and handcrafted components on uru boats deteriorated at faster rates than similar parts on modern metal boats and needed more frequent repairs and servicing At the same time, there was increasing availability of affordable metal dhows, which were built much faster using modern techniques as opposed to the urus which still relied on traditional and indigenous building techniques. These factors helped contribute to a decades-long pause in the construction of urus.

The Beypore ship yards produced very few urus for decades but saw a resurgence in popularity in the 2010s as the Persian Gulf became a major market for Urus. While Urus were previously built for trade and shipping, the boats being built in the 2010s were almost entirely constructed as luxury yachts for the wealthy. Qatar became a major market for Urus in 2011 after the Qatari Royal Family began commissioning Urus and since then, at least one Uru has left Beypore for Qatar each year. Puzhakkara Rameshan, a chief carpenter who has worked on multiple Urus destined for Qatar observed that, “Now many of the craftsmen are back to building Uru. Since 2011 our company has worked on two or three Urus simultaneously. In connection with the 2022 Football World Cup in Qatar, we have already received a few orders from the country.” The uru construction industry's resurgence is mainly attributed to centuries of trade between Western India and the Middle East. Although urus come from Beypore in the state of Kerala, they were usually sold to Persian Gulf countries as merchant vessels, thus holding historical and cultural significance in the region. As these countries grew in wealth, there was a desire to reconnect with their traditions and heritage, resulting in an increased demand for urus outfitted with modern amenities for luxury cruising. This underscores the impact that economic prosperity in the gulf had on the shipbuilding community of Beypore.

== Construction ==
As an art passed down through generations, uru-making is an undocumented practice. There are no build plans, sketches, drawings, or blueprints that the makers refer to. From conception to completion, it is all in the mind of the master carpenter of a yard, who assigns work to his assistants on a daily basis, so as to keep the secrecy that shrouds the technology intact.

There are multiple groups of people that work together in order to construct an uru, including Odayis, Mappila Khalasis, Burmakkar and agents. These titles correspond to the roles that people play in the construction of an Uru. Odayis manage the technical matters and take on the role of mesteris or master shipbuilders. Only a handful of mesteris exist today and they are the only people who know how to build an entire Uru while the rest of the shipbuilders are only skilled at specific tasks. There are fears that this knowledge could one day die out as it passed down orally from one generation to the next and there has been very little scientific study of the shipbuilding process. There are no printed sketches or instructions, so any revival process would be extremely difficult if the mesteris die out. The Mappilla Khalasis are the second highest ranking members on an uru building yard and perform manual labor. They are also responsible for launching the uru once it has been completed, an important moment which is celebrated by the entire community with songs and rituals as it often takes years to complete a single boat. The Burmakkar are skilled metal workers who are responsible for creating the nails used in the construction, and the anchor and chain. Agents, a newer group in the uru construction industry, act as brokers between the mesteris and customers.

== See also ==
- Pattamar
- Magan boat
- Kattumaram
