= Kattumaram =

Traditional watercraft made from logs lashed together

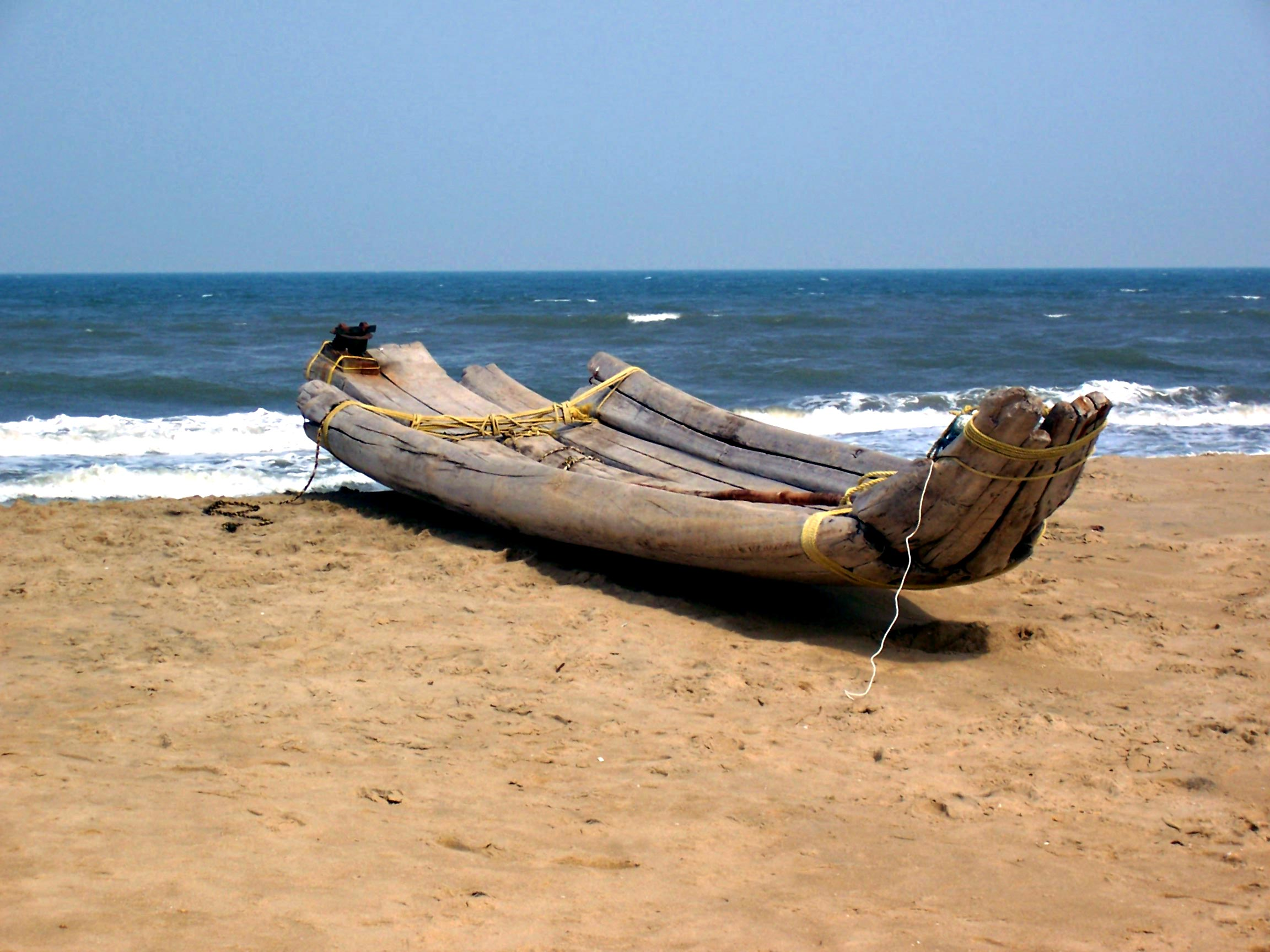
A kattumaram from Chennai, Tamil Nadu

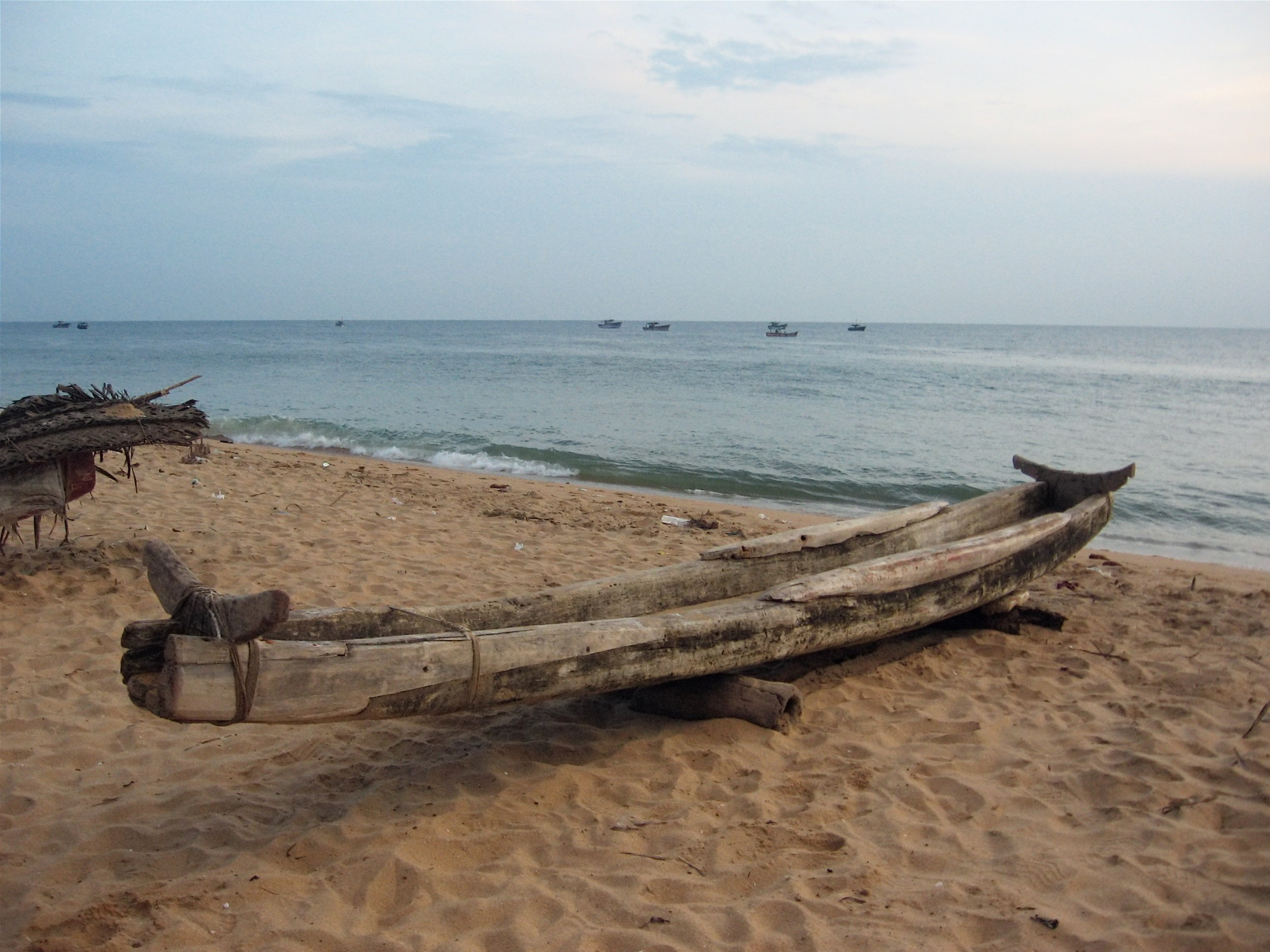
A kattumaram from Kerala

Kattumaram (Tamil: கட்டுமரம்) is a traditional Tamil watercraft used in the Coast of Southern India, Sri Lanka, and Bangladesh. They are characterized by being made from three to seven tree trunks tied together with fiber lashings and/or treenails. The lashings are not permanent and the individual tree trunks are commonly separated to dry under the sun when kattumaram are beached. Most kattumaram are rafts because they are not watertight and rely on the buoyancy of the individual logs. However, some types of kattumaram known as teppa are watertight due to the addition polystyrene fillings on the hull and thus are true boats. They are propelled by oars, paddles, or lateen or lug sails. Modern versions of the kattumaram made from fibreglass are known as "fibre-teppa".

The name "kattumaram" is Tamil for "tied wood," from kattu "binding" + maram "wood". Small kattumaram are called chinnamaram, while larger kattumaram are called periamaram. The term "kattumaram" is also the origin of the English word "catamaran", which later evolved to mean the unrelated double-hulled outrigger boats of the Austronesian peoples.

== Etymology ==
The English word "catamaran" is derived from the Tamil word, kattumaram (கட்டுமரம்), which means "logs bound together". However, the original kattumaram did not refer to double-hulled boats at all, but to a type of single-hulled raft of the Tamil people made of three to seven tree trunks lashed together. The term has evolved in English usage to refer solely to unrelated double-hulled boats.

== See also ==
- Dhow
