= Boom (ship) =

Medium-sized deep-sea dhow

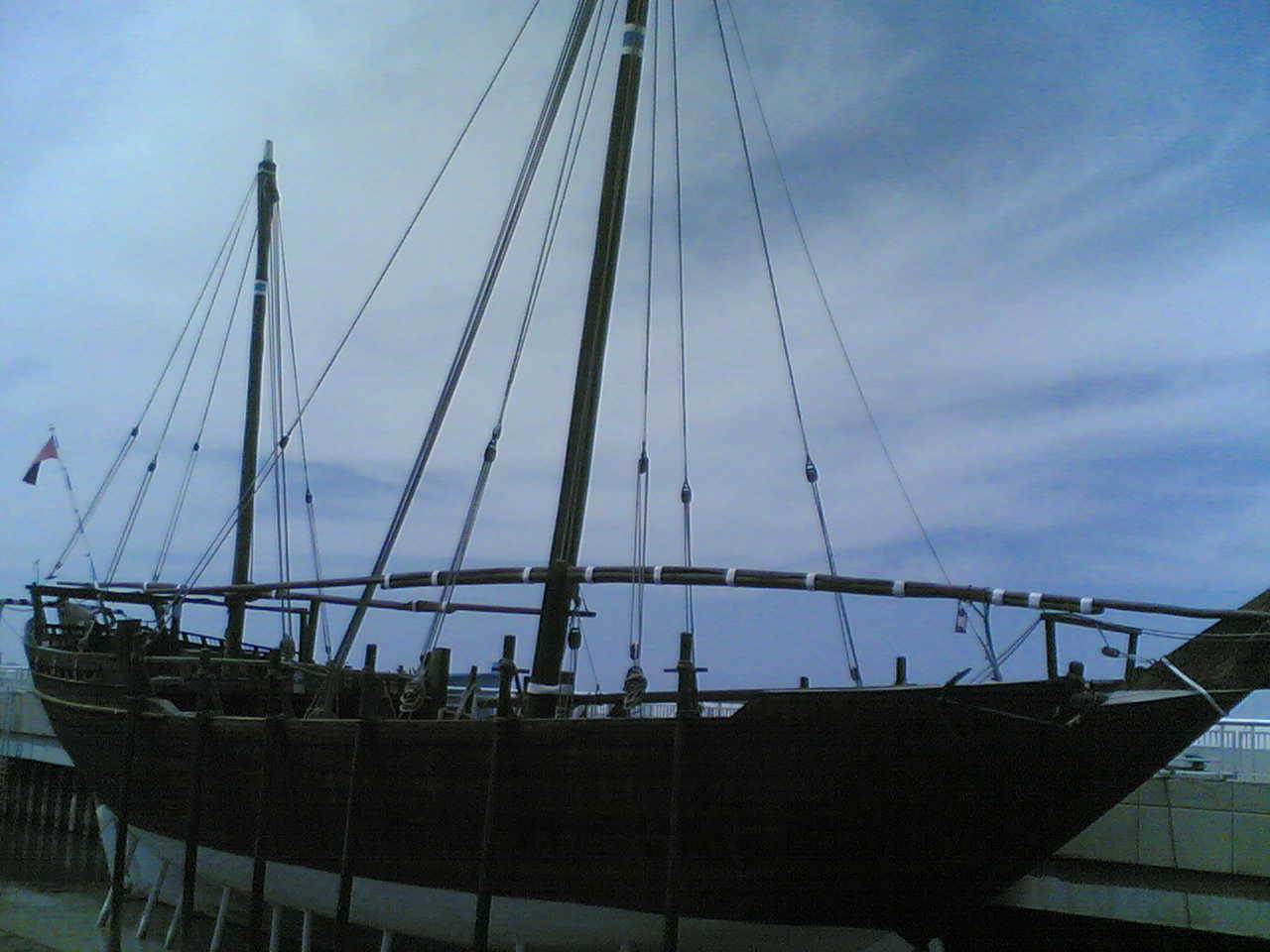
Picture of a boum in Kuwait.

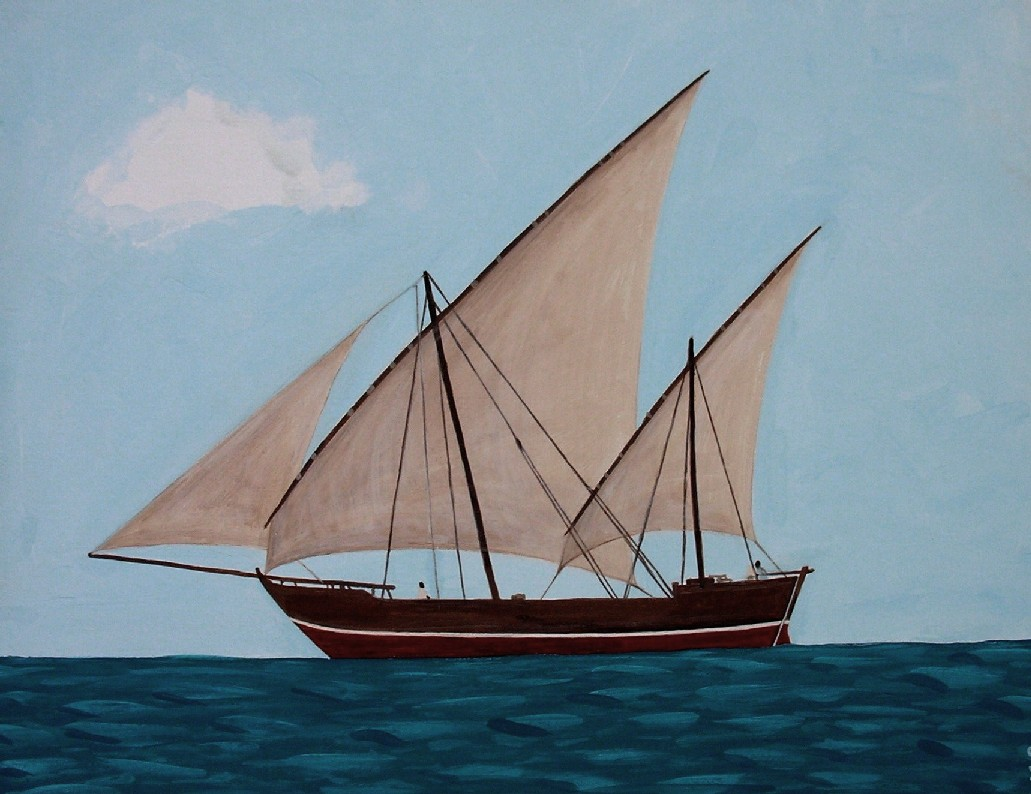
An Indian-style boum sailing. Note the shorter prow

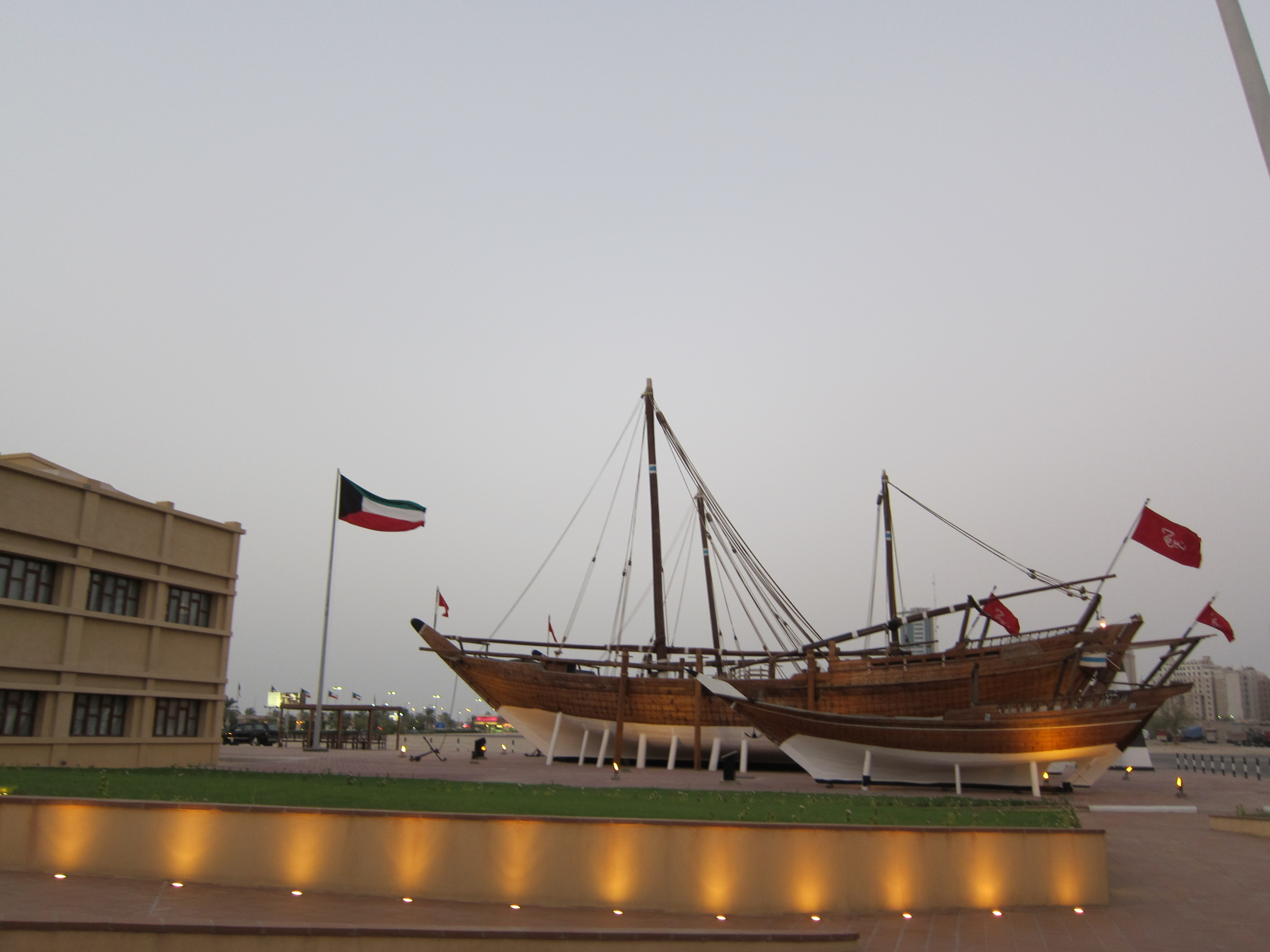
Boum; Maritime Museum in Kuwait City commemorating the founding of Kuwait as a sea port for merchants.

A boum/boom (Arabic: بوم) (French: bhum), known as dhangi in India, is a medium-sized deep-sea dhow, a traditional Arabic sailing vessel.

This type of dhow has two masts with lateen sails, a stern that is tapering in shape, and a more symmetrical overall structure than other dhow types. The Arab boum has a very high prow, which is trimmed in the Indian version.

== History ==
The boum replaced the heavier baghlahs and ghanjahs, which were more difficult to maneuver. Booms were mainly built in Beypore, Konkan and Gujarat, India, and Kuwait and are primarily used along the coasts of the Arabian Peninsula, Sindh, the west coast of the Indian subcontinent, and East Africa.

Nowadays, some Booms have been converted into motorboats after being fitted with engines instead of sails, especially in the Persian Gulf area. A boum in full sail is represented in the Emblem of Kuwait, emphasizing its traditional importance in the country, where it was used to carry fresh water and in the pearl industry, as well as a trading ship.

== See also ==
- Kuwait Scientific Center
- Uru (boat)
- Ghanjah
- Shu'ai
