= Baghlah =

Arabian dhow

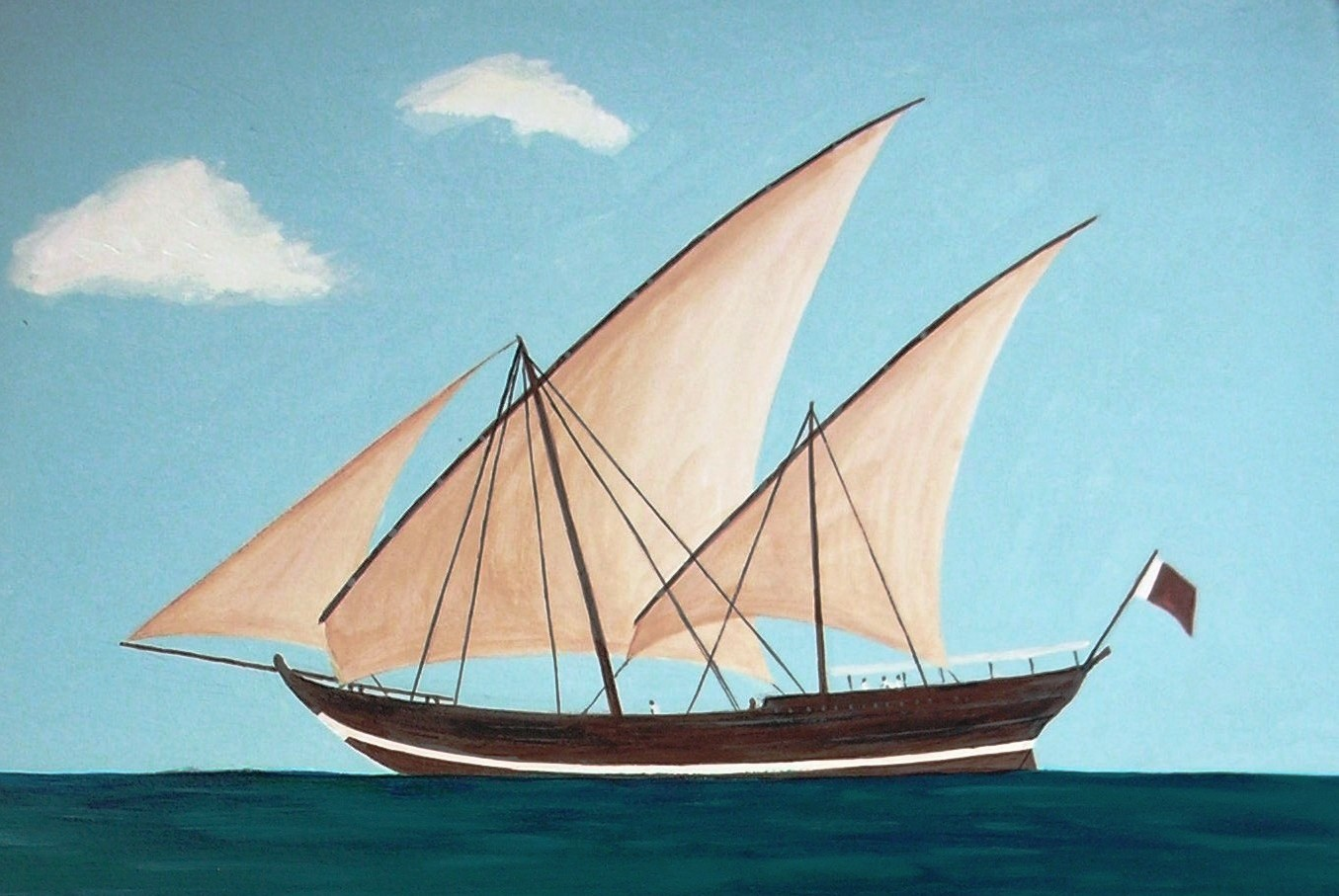
Baghlah sailing

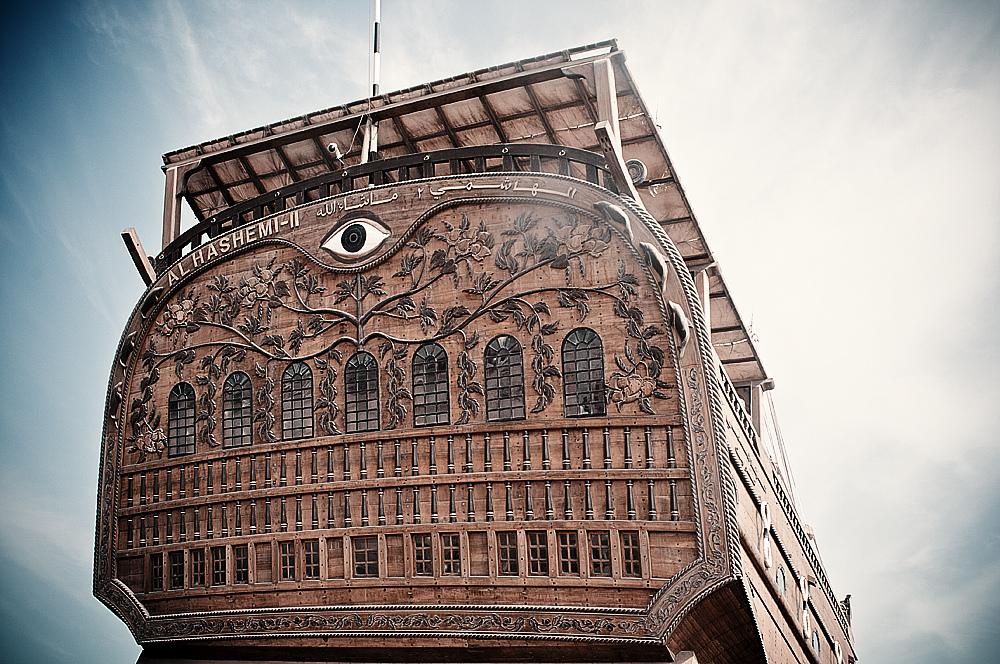
The ornate stern of a baghlah in Kuwait

A baghlah, bagala, bugala or baggala (Arabic: بغلة) is a large deep-sea dhow, a traditional Arab sailing vessel or cargo dhow. The name "baghla" means "mule" in the Arabic language.

== Description ==
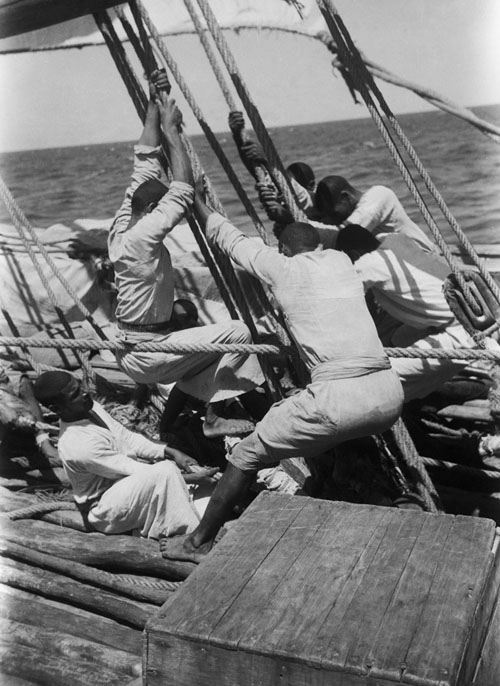
A baghlah needed to be crewed by numerous sailors

The baghlah dhows have a curved prow with a stem-head, and sometimes an ornately carved stern and quarter galleries. Their average length w is 100 ft (30 m) with an average weight of 275 tons. Usually they have two masts using two to three lateen sails; supplementary sails like a jib are often added on the bowsprit, as well as on a topmast atop the main mast. As a large and heavy ship the baghlah require a crew of at least 30 sailors. Some have even up to 40.

The ghanjah or kotiya is a similar type of vessel, often difficult to distinguish from the baghlah.

== History ==
Baghlahs are widely used and have been in the past centuries as merchant ships in the Indian Ocean and the minor seas around the Arabian Peninsula. They reach eastwards to Sindh, India and up to the Bay of Bengal and further beyond as far as the Spice Islands. Southwestwards they reach down to the East African coast. They are one of the main types of ship used by Bohra traders.

In the early 19th century these ships were also part of the pirate fleets operating from semi-independent or completely independent harbours in Persia or along the Arabian Peninsula.

During the 19th century, the Royal Navy attempted to suppress the Indian Ocean slave trade and in his 1873 book, Captain G. L. Sulivan described the "Bugala or genuine Dhow" as "by far the most numerous class" of dhow.

In favorable conditions a baghlah can sail up to 9 knots, but is a somewhat unwieldy ship and is not as popular as the easier to maneuver boom.

== See also ==
- Persian Gulf campaign of 1809
- Boom (ship)
- Ghanjah
- Shu'ai
- Dhow
