= Dhow =

Type of sailing vessel from the Indian Ocean

A dhow in the Indian Ocean, near the islands of Zanzibar on the Swahili coast

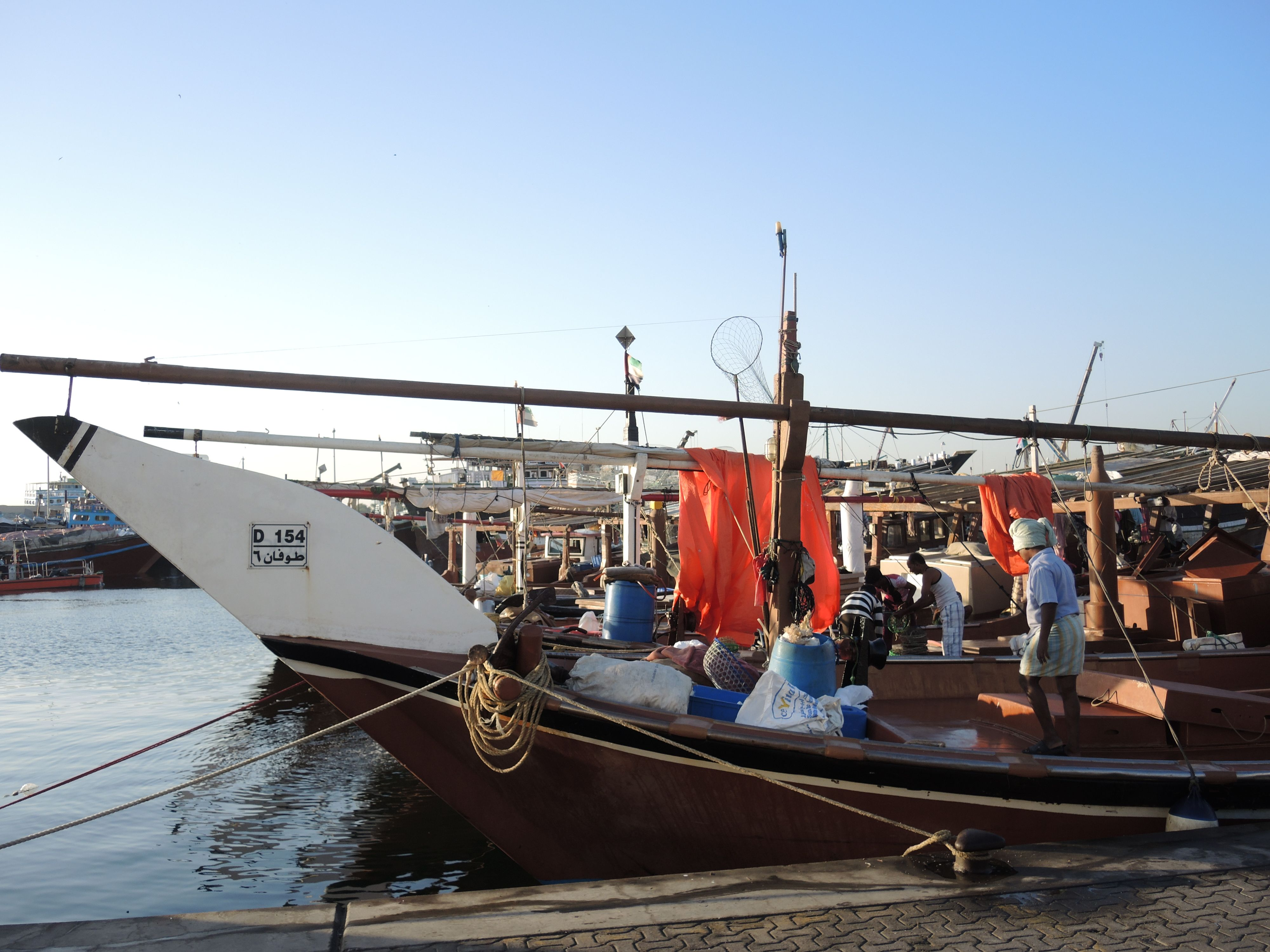
Fishermen's dhows moored at Dubai in 2014

Dhow (/daʊ/; Arabic: داو, romanized: dāw) is the generic name of a number of traditional sailing vessels with one or more masts with settee or sometimes lateen sails, used in the Red Sea and Indian Ocean region. Typically sporting long thin hulls, dhows are trading vessels primarily used to carry heavy items, such as fruit, fresh water, or other heavy merchandise, along the coasts of Eastern Arabia, Iran, East Africa, Yemen and coastal South Asia. Larger dhows have crews of approximately thirty and smaller ones typically around twelve.

== Etymology ==
There are several versions of the origin of the word "dau". Previously, it was believed that it could be of Arabic or Persian origin (and although in the 21st century there is no such word in either Arabic or Persian, some Dutch documents from the 17th-18th centuries indicate that then the Persian word dawh meant "small ship"). Recently, most researchers are inclined to believe that this term comes from daw in the language of the Swahili people in East Africa, which means "vessel". However, regardless of the sources of its origin, the use of "dhow" as a collective term to refer to the boats of the Indian Ocean with characteristic "Arabian" sails, was introduced definitely by Europeans. Since in the European tradition ships were classified mainly according to their sailing equipment, all the ships of the Indian Ocean that carried similar Arabian sails and looked more or less the same to the untrained European eye were known to Europeans by a single word, "dhow".

At the same time, neither the Arabs nor the Indians use the term "dhow" to refer to their vessels collectively. The collective terms used in Arabic for ships are markab, khashab and falūka; falūka is related to the term fulk (Arabic: فُلك) used in the Qur'an to describe Noah's ark. On the other hand, the peoples of the Indian Ocean use separate special names for each type of ship, differing from each other mainly not in sailing rigging, but in size, hull design and number of masts.

== History ==
The exact origins of the dhow are lost to history. Most scholars believe that it originated in India from 600 BC to 600 AD, although there are some who claim that the sanbuk, a type of dhow, may be derived from the Portuguese caravel. However, Portuguese caravels only appeared in the area in the late 15th century. The dhow was the ship of trade first used by the Somalis. The Somali people who are known to have the oldest surviving dhow which is called Beden, have traded with the ancient world from Egypt, Babylon, as well as the civilizations of the Far East, carrying valuable frankincense, myrrh, gold, etc. It was the Somali merchants that first introduced exotic animals from Africa to the Ming Dynasty. The dhow was used to transport a giraffe to the Chinese Emperor Yong Le's court, in 1414. Another source suggests the ship that carried the giraffe to China was part of a large Chinese fleet led by Zheng He.

Ships that are similar to the dhow are mentioned or described in the 1001 Nights including various ports where they harboured. The dhow is also associated with the pearl trade.

The Yemeni Hadhrami people, as well as Omanis, for centuries came to Beypore, in Kerala, India for their dhows. This was because of the good timber in the Kerala forests, the availability of good coir rope, and the skilled shipwrights. In former times, the sheathing planks of a dhow's hull was held together by coconut rope. Beypore dhows are known as 'Uru' in Malayalam, the local language of Kerala. Settlers from Yemen, known as 'Baramis', or 'Daramis' which could be derived from the word 'Hardamis' are still active in making urus in Kerala.

Dhows were extensively used for the Red Sea slave trade and the Indian Ocean slave trade, which the Royal Navy attempted to suppress. In his 1873 book, Captain G. L. Sulivan described "four different kinds of coasting dhows, as shown in the engravings, viz. the Bateele, the Badane, Bugala or genuine Dhow, and the Matapa boat".

=== Since the 20th century ===
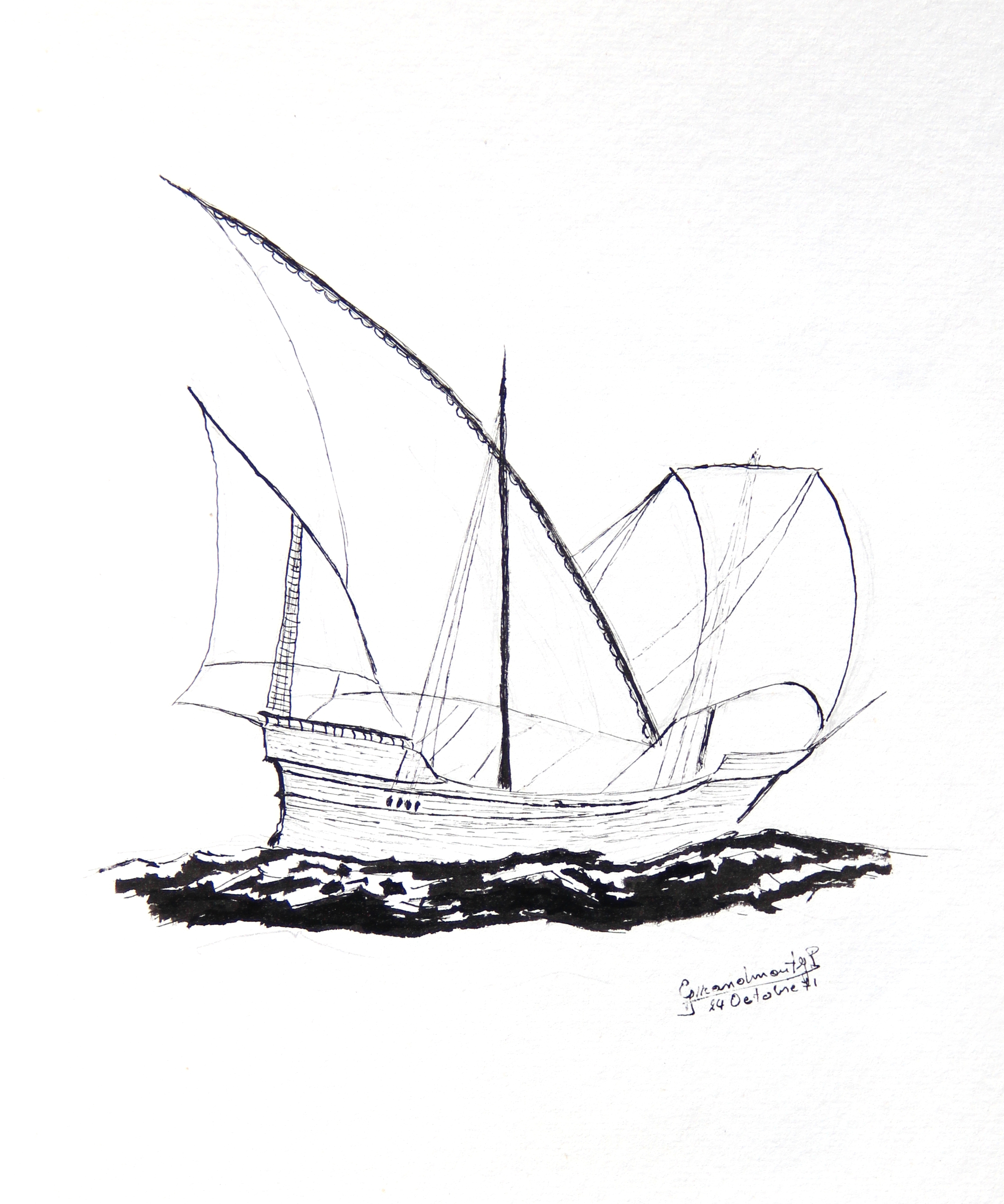
Moroccan dhow.

In the 1920s, British writers identified Al Hudaydah as the centre for dhow building. Those built in Al Hudaydah were smaller in size, and used for travel along the coasts. They were constructed of acacia found in Yemen. They are distinguishable for their smaller triangular sails on movable bases to harvest the irregular winds of the Red Sea.

Captain Alan Villiers (1903–1982) documented the days of sailing trade in the Indian Ocean by sailing on dhows between 1938 and 1939 taking numerous photographs and publishing books on the subject of dhow navigation.

Even to the present day, dhows make commercial journeys between the Persian Gulf and East Africa using sails as their only means of propulsion. Their cargo is mostly dates and fish to East Africa and mangrove timber to the lands in the Persian Gulf. They often sail south with the monsoon in winter or early spring, and back again to Arabia in late spring or early summer.

== Navigation ==
For celestial navigation, dhow sailors have traditionally used the kamal, an observation device that determines latitude by finding the angle of the Pole Star above the horizon.

== Types ==
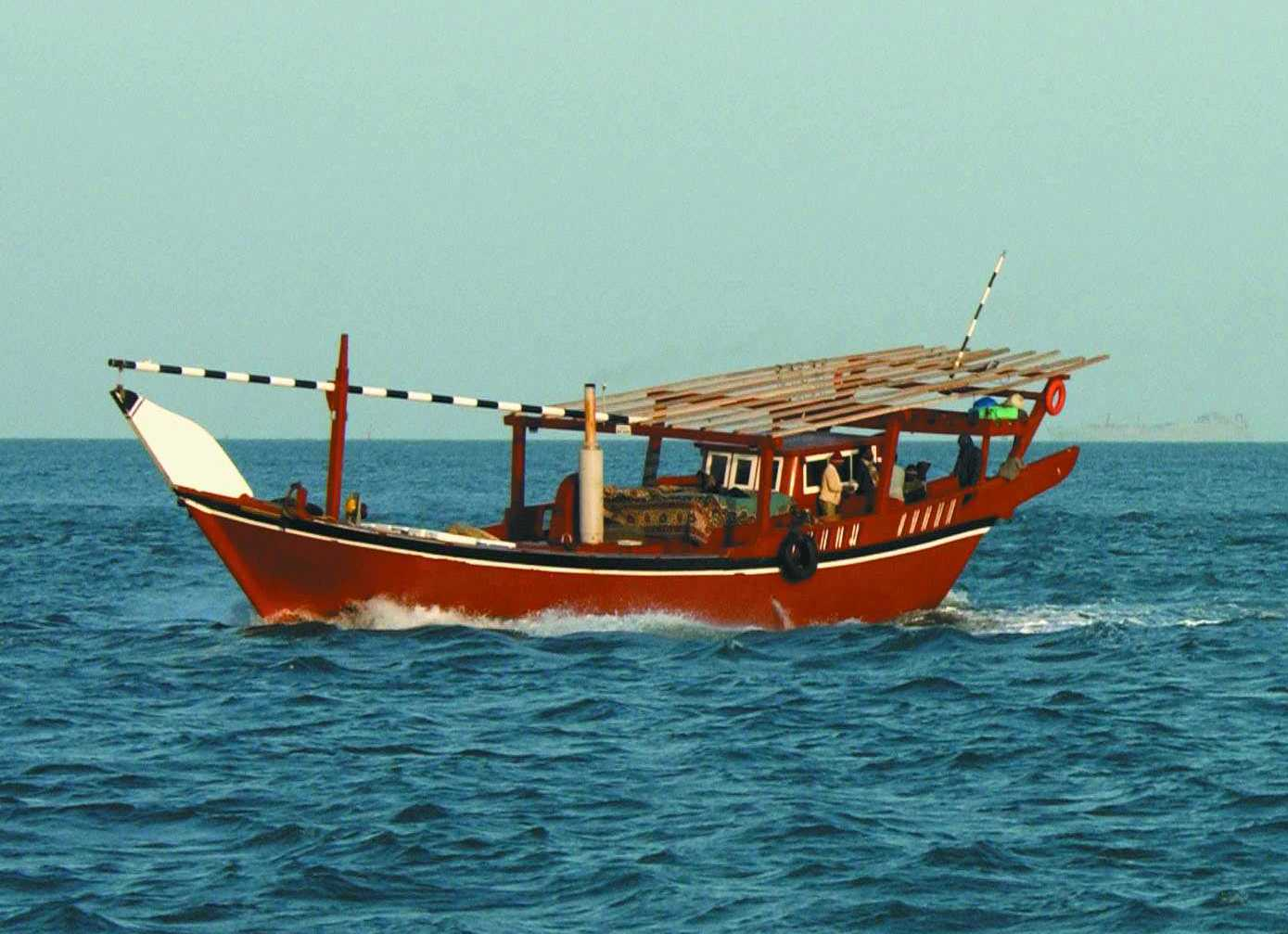
A Shu'ai in the Persian Gulf

- Baghlah (بغلة) – from the Arabic language word for "mule". A heavy ship, the traditional deep-sea dhow.
- Baqarah or baggarah (بقارة) – from the Arabic word for "cow". Old type of small dhow similar to the Battil.
- Barijah – small dhow.
- Battil (بتيل) – featured long stems topped by large, club-shaped stem heads.
- Beden – a smaller vessel requiring a shallow draft.
- Boom (Arabic: بوم, romanized: būm) or dhangi – a large-sized dhow with a stern that is tapering in shape and a more symmetrical overall structure. The Arab boum has a very high prow, which is trimmed in the Indian version.
- Ghanjah (غنجة) or kotiya – a large vessel, similar to the Baghlah, with a curved stem and a sloping, ornately carved transom.
- Jahazi or jihazi (جهازي). A fishing or trading dhow with a broad hull similar to the jalibut, common in Lamu Island and the coast of Oman. It is also used in Bahrain for the pearl industry. The word comes from jahāz (جهاز), a Persian word for "ship".
- Jaliboot or jelbut (جالبوت). A small to medium-sized dhow. It is the modern version of the shu'ai with a shorter prow stem piece. Most jalibuts are fitted with engines.
- Patamar, a type of Indian dhow.
- Sambuk or sambuq (صنبوق) – the largest type of dhow seen in the Persian Gulf today. It has a characteristic keel design, with a sharp curve right below the top of the prow. It has been one of the most successful dhows in history. The word is cognate with the Greek σαμβύκη sambúkē, ultimately from Middle Persian sambūk.
- Shu'ai (شوعي). Medium-sized dhow. Formerly the most common dhow in the Persian Gulf used for fishing as well as for coastal trade.
- Zaruq – small dhow, slightly larger than a barijah
- Dhoni – Maldivian traditional multi-purpose sail vessel.

The term "dhow" is sometimes also applied to certain smaller lateen-sail rigged boats traditionally used in the Red Sea, the eastern Mediterranean and the Persian Gulf area, as well as in the Indian Ocean from Madagascar to the Bay of Bengal. These include the feluccas used in Egypt, Sudan and Iraq, and the dhoni used in the Maldives, as well as the tranki, ghrab and ghalafah. All these vessels have common elements with the dhow. On the Swahili Coast, in countries such as Kenya, the Swahili word used for dhow is "jahazi".

== Museums ==
The Kuwaiti Maritime Museum in Salmiya, Kuwait, holds replicas of a number of different types of dhows.

The Al-Hashemi-II (1997-2001), in Kuwait City, Kuwait, was recognized by Guinness World Record as the largest wooden dhow ever built; it has never been floated and is used for events.

== Gallery ==
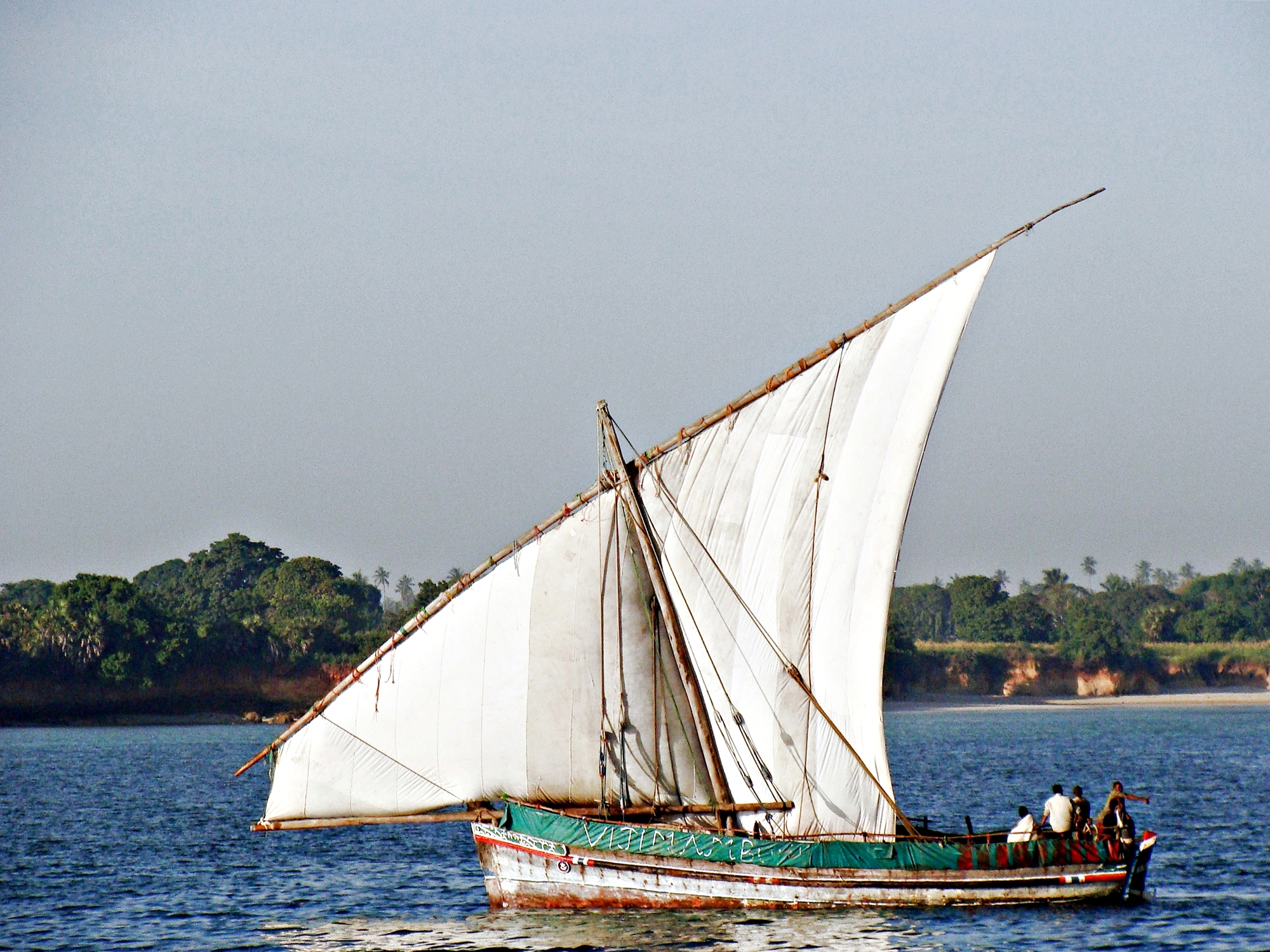
Dhow seen off the coast of Dar es Salaam, Tanzania

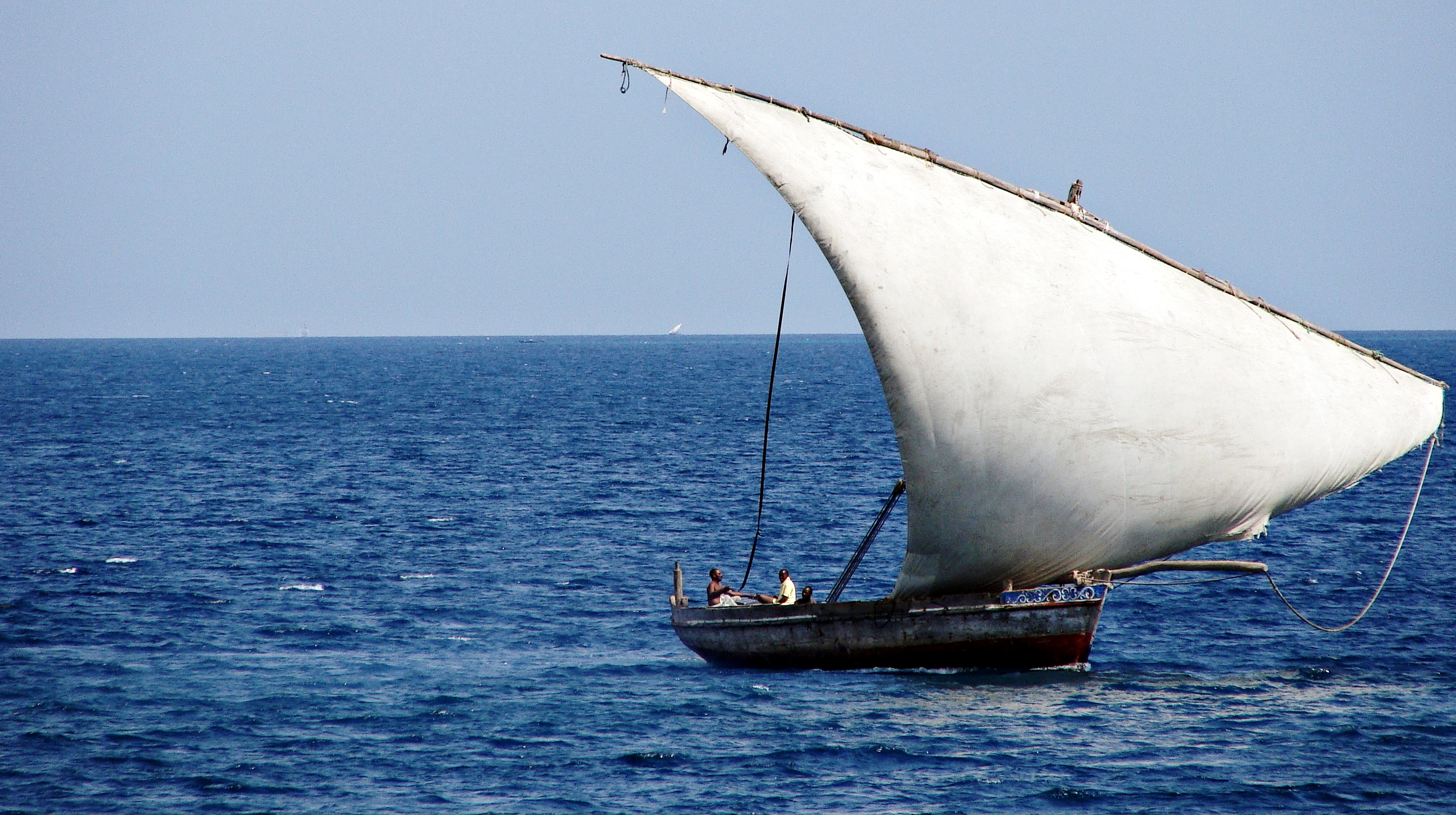
Dhow seen in the Indian Ocean

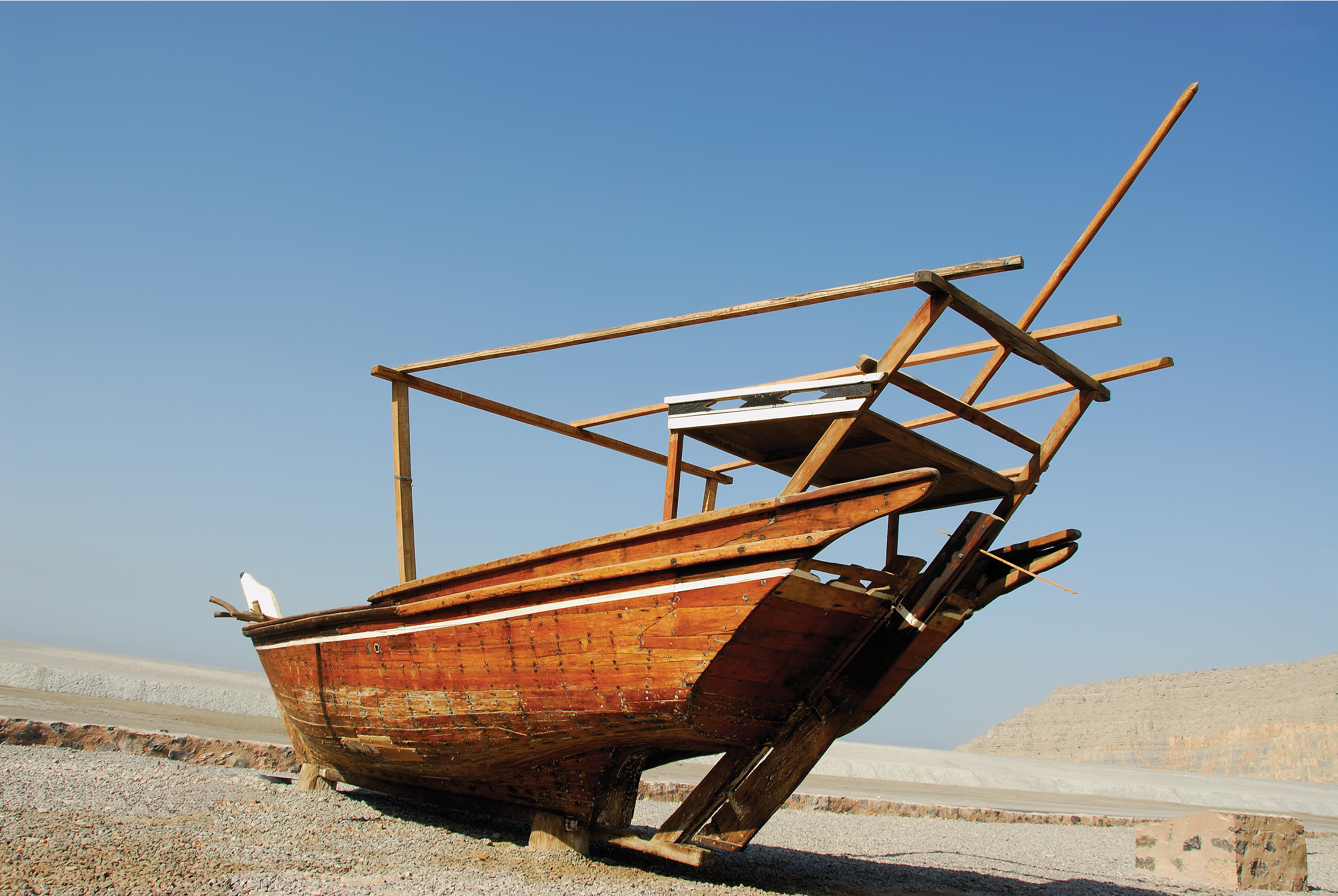
A dhow in the desert in Qatar

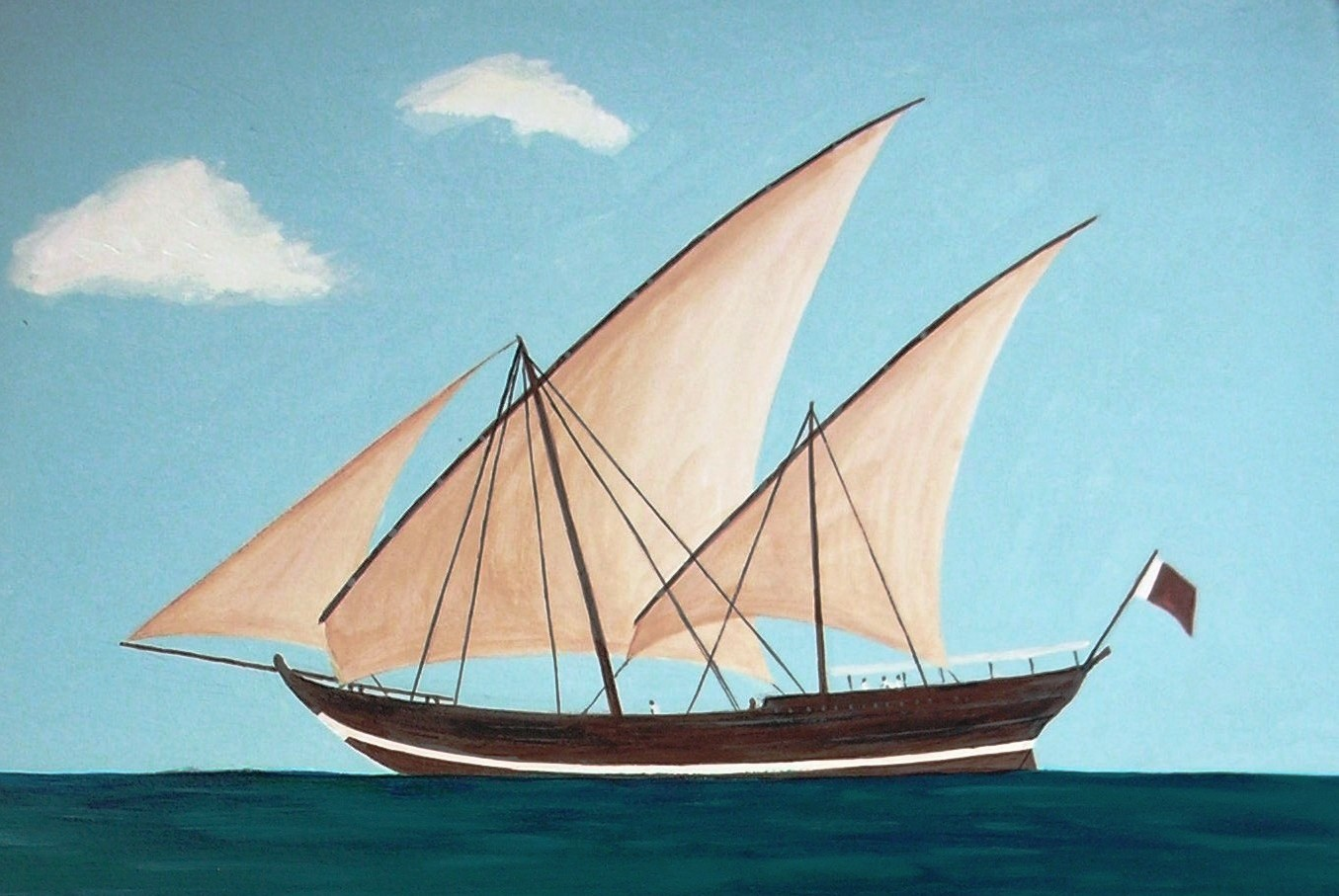
A painting of a Baghlah, traditional deep sea dhow

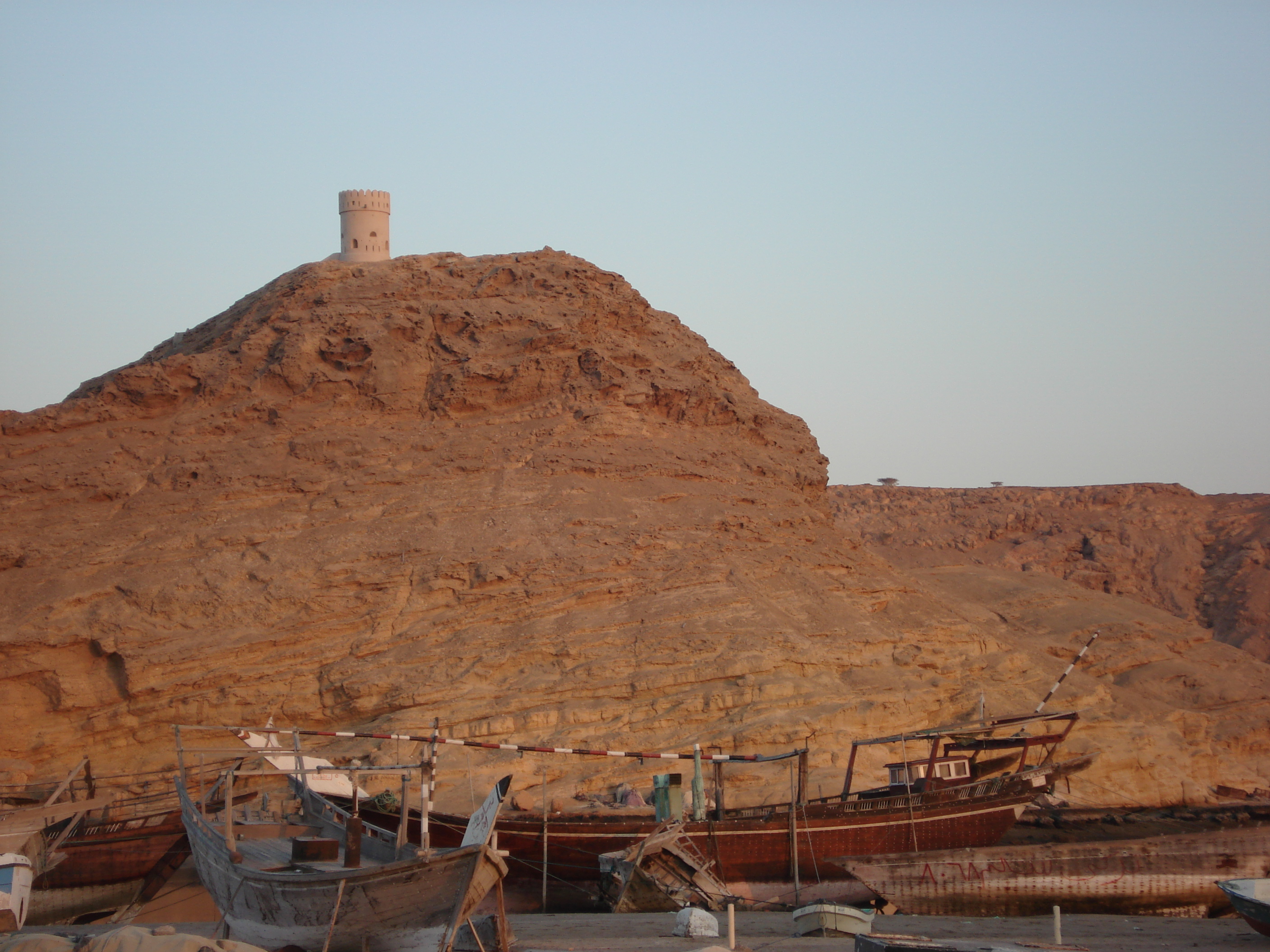
Construction and repair of dhows in Sur, Oman

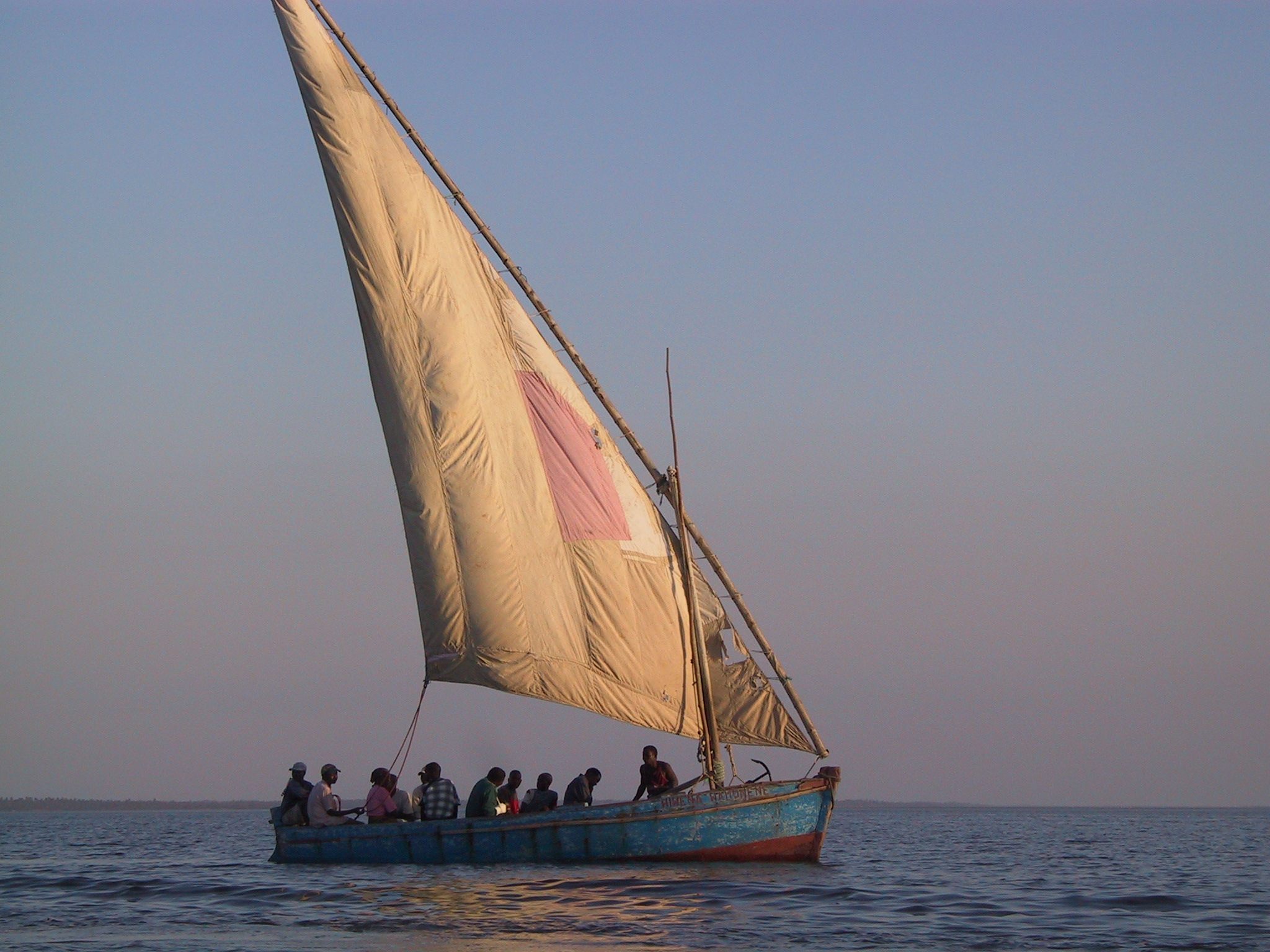
Dhow ferrying passengers near Inhambane, Mozambique

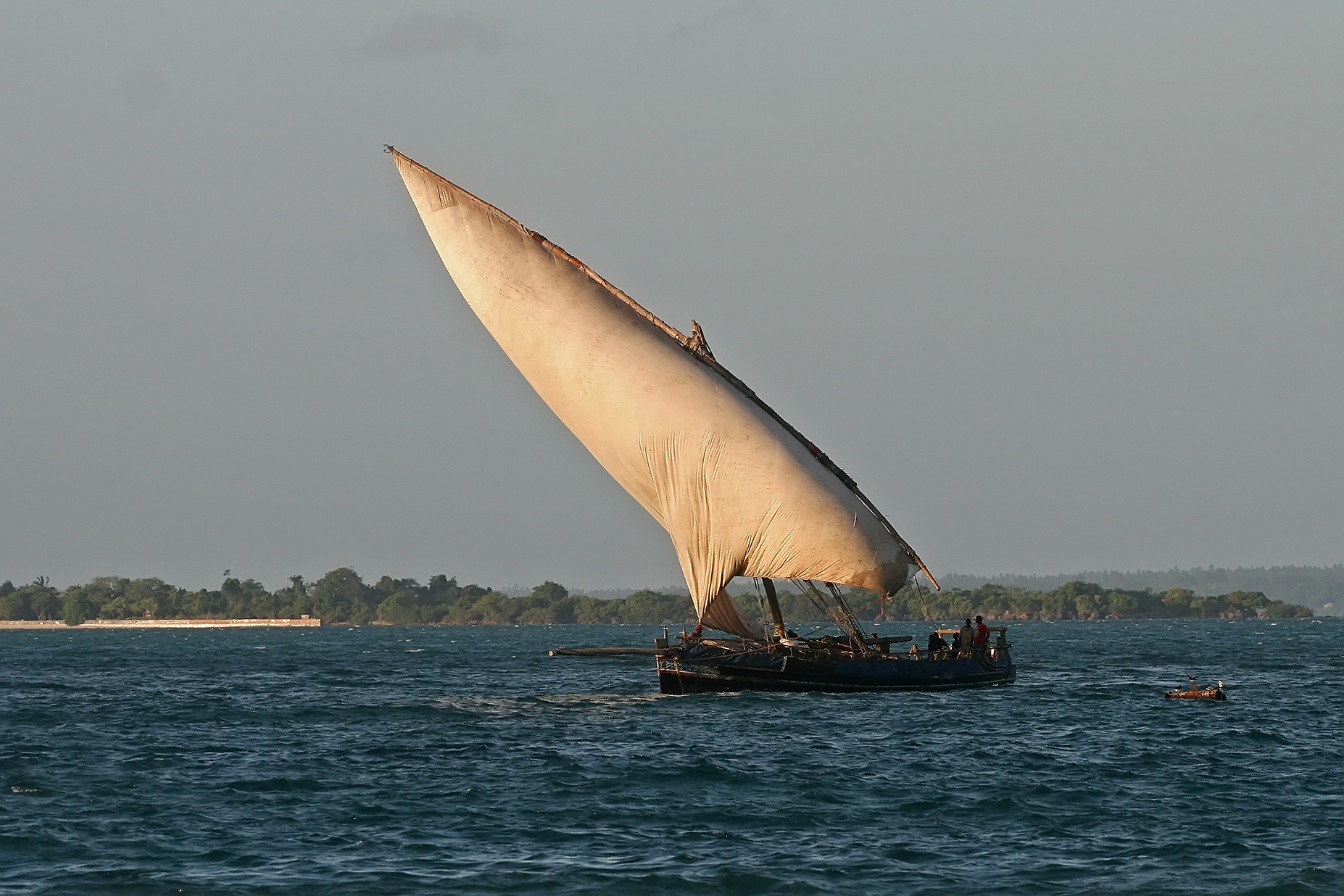
A small dhow in Zanzibar

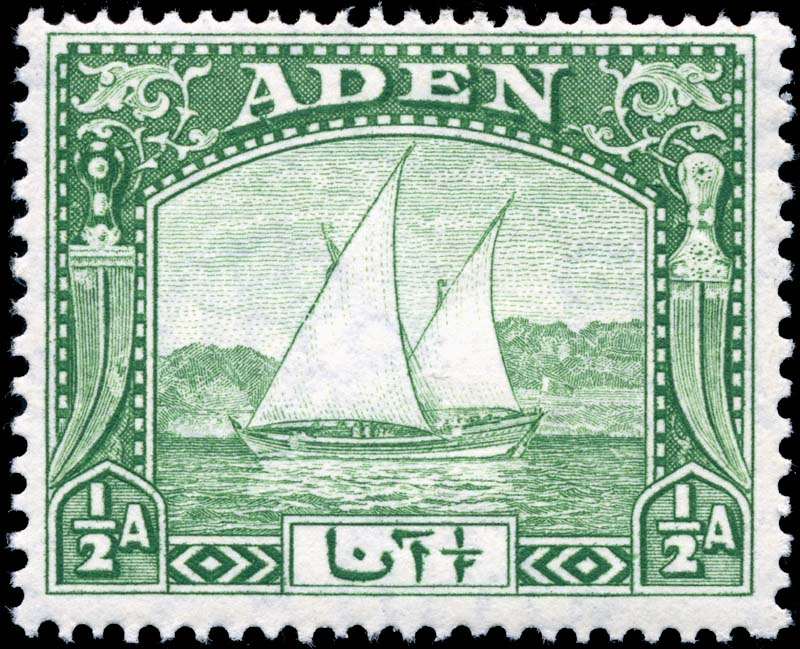
1937 stamp of Aden, Yemen depicting a dhow

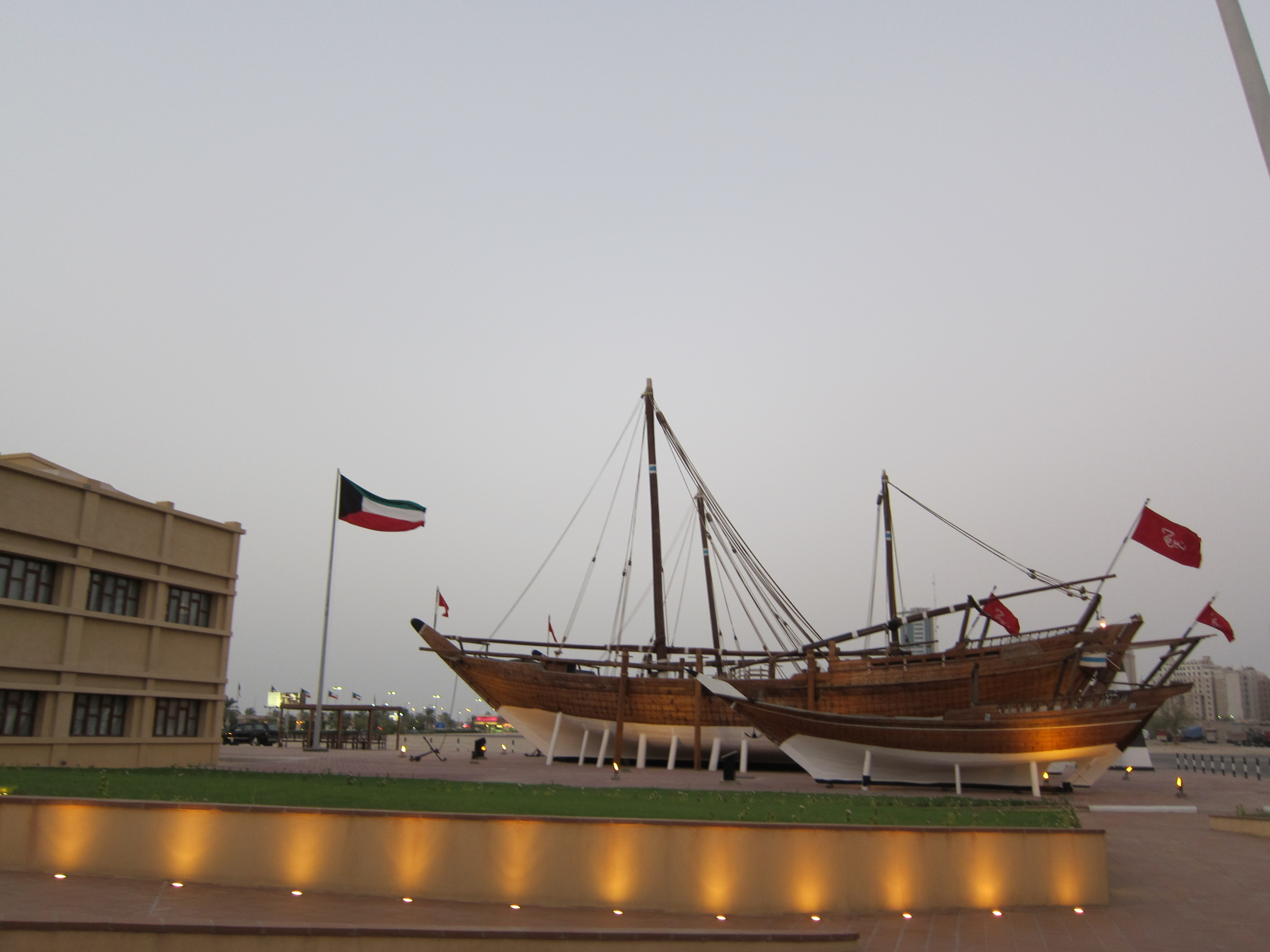
Boom in the Maritime Museum in Kuwait City commemorating the founding of Kuwait as a sea port for merchants

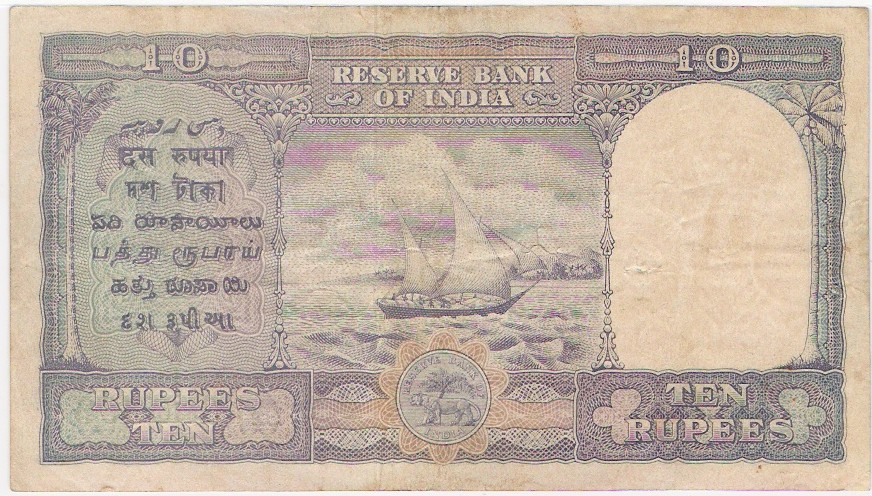
Patamar on a 10 Indian rupee note

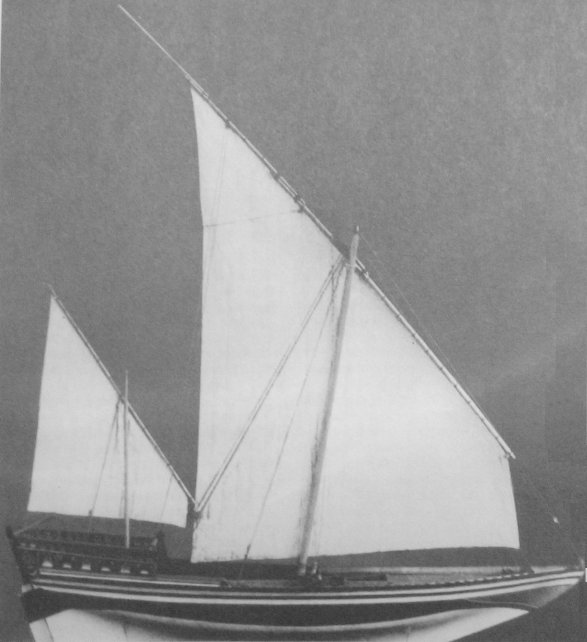
Model of a Sambuk

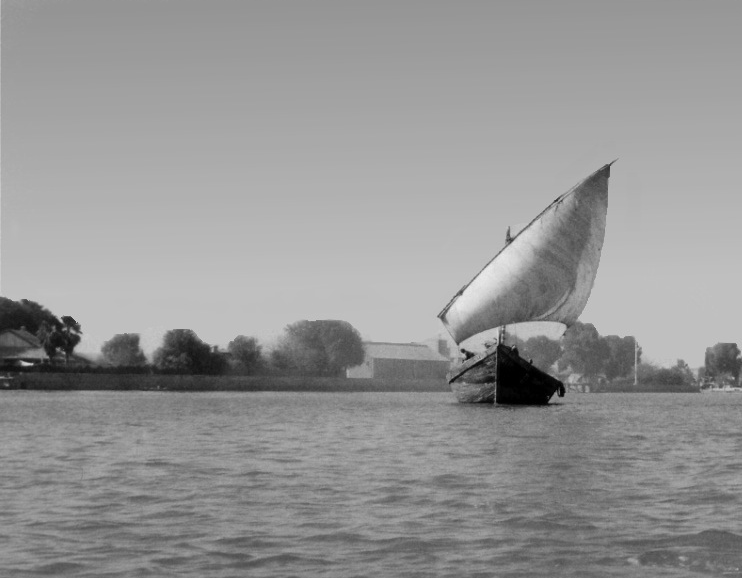
Dhow on the Shatt al-Arab (1958)

== See also ==
- Felucca
- Fusta
- Guilalo
- Kattumaram
- Uru (boat)
- Xebec
- Mahhat - Traditional Boat in Corporate Games

== Bibliography ==
- Agius, Dionisius A (2008), Classic Ships of Islam: From Mesopotamia to the Indian Ocean, Brill, ISBN 978-90-0415863-4.
