= Ghanjah =

Large wooden trading dhow

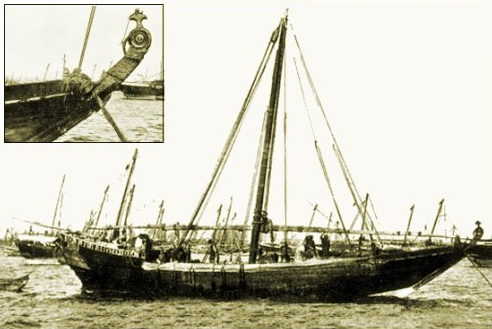
A ghanjah at Bombay harbor in 1909

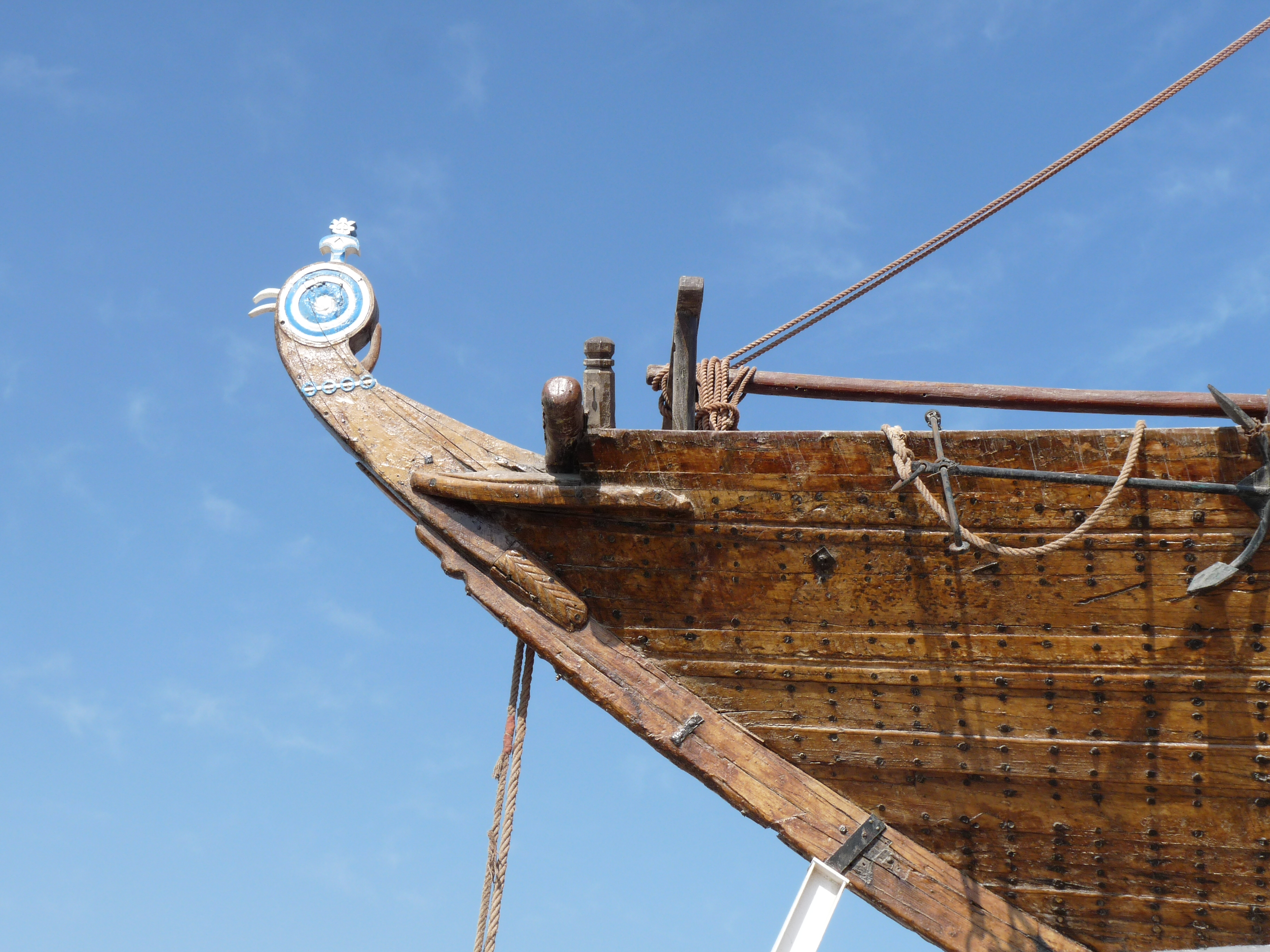
A ghanjah in dry dock showing the trefoil ornament on the prow

A ghanjah or ganja (Arabic: غنجه), is a large wooden trading dhow, a traditional Indian sailing vessel.

== Description ==
The ghanjah dhows had a curved prow with a characteristic trefoil ornament carved on top of the stem-head. They also had an ornately carved stern and quarter galleries. Their average length was 97 ft (30 m) with a 15 m (49 ft) keel-length and an average weight of 215 tons. Usually they had two masts, the main mast having a pronounced inclination towards the prow. They used two to three lateen sails; supplementary sails were often added on the bowsprit and on a topmast atop the main mast.

The ghanjah is often difficult to distinguish from the baghlah, a similar type of dhow. Besides the trefoil-shaped carving on top of the stem-head, ghanjahs usually had a more slender shape.

== History ==
Ghanjahs were widely used in the past centuries as merchant ships in the Indian Ocean between the western coast of the Indian subcontinent and the Arabian Peninsula. Many ghanjahs were built at traditional shipyards in Sur, Oman, as well as in Beypore, Kerala, India.

Ghanjahs were largely replaced by the newer-designed and easier to maneuver booms in the 20th century.

== See also ==
- Dhow
- Baghlah
- Shu'ai
