= Batil (ship) =

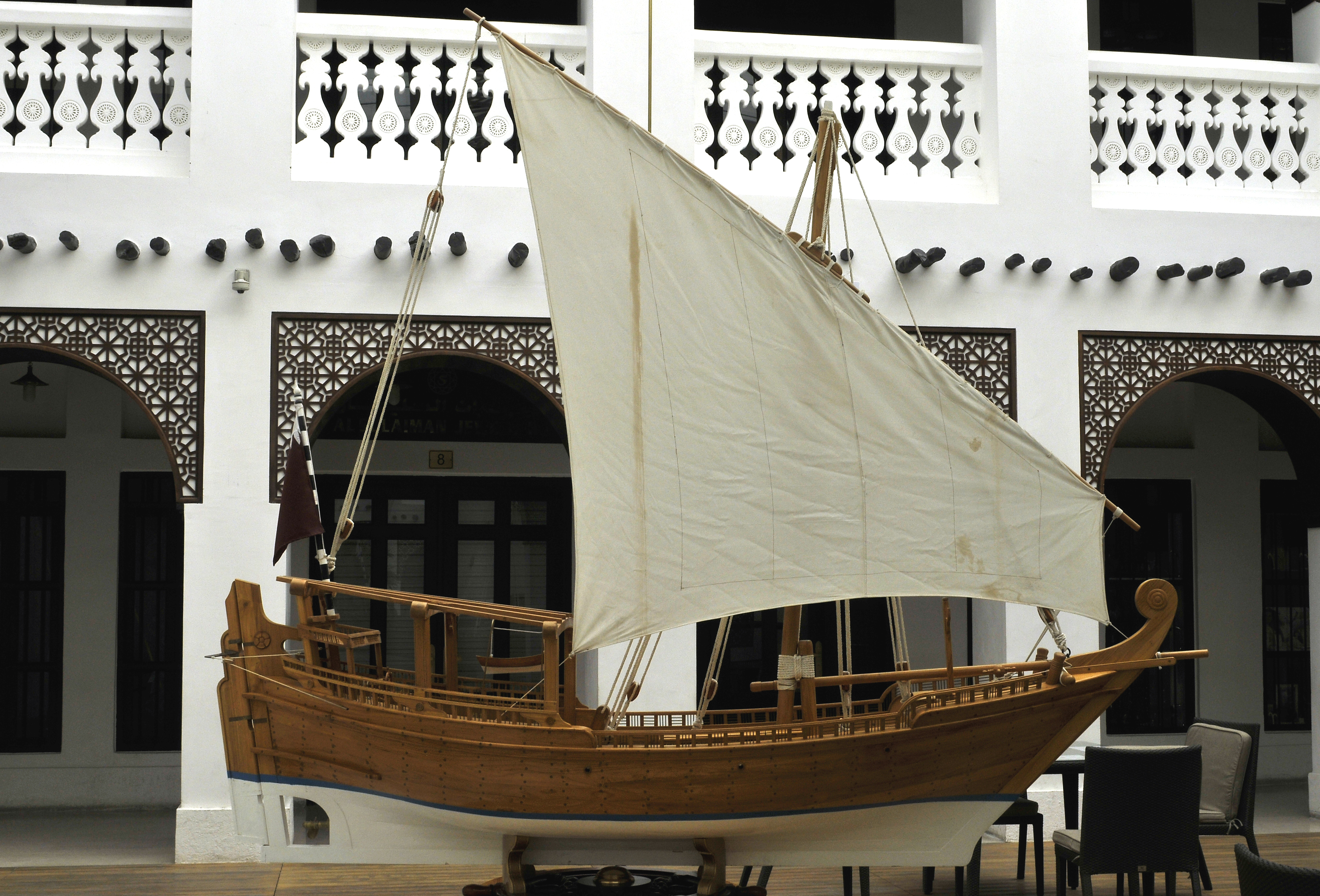
Model of batil in Doha, Qatar

Batil (Arabic: بتيل batīl), also spelled bateel or battil, is a traditional type of sailing vessel from Kuwait with a fiddle-headed bow and a high sternboard.
