= Sambuk =

Type of dhow, a traditional wooden sailing vessel

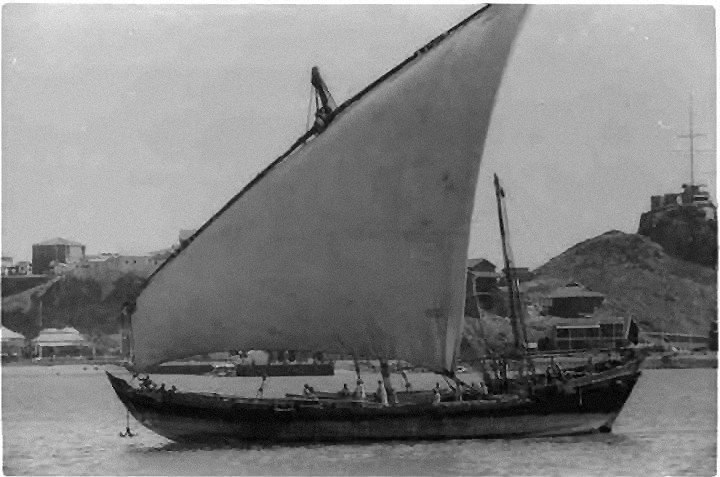
A sanbuk in Aden in 1936

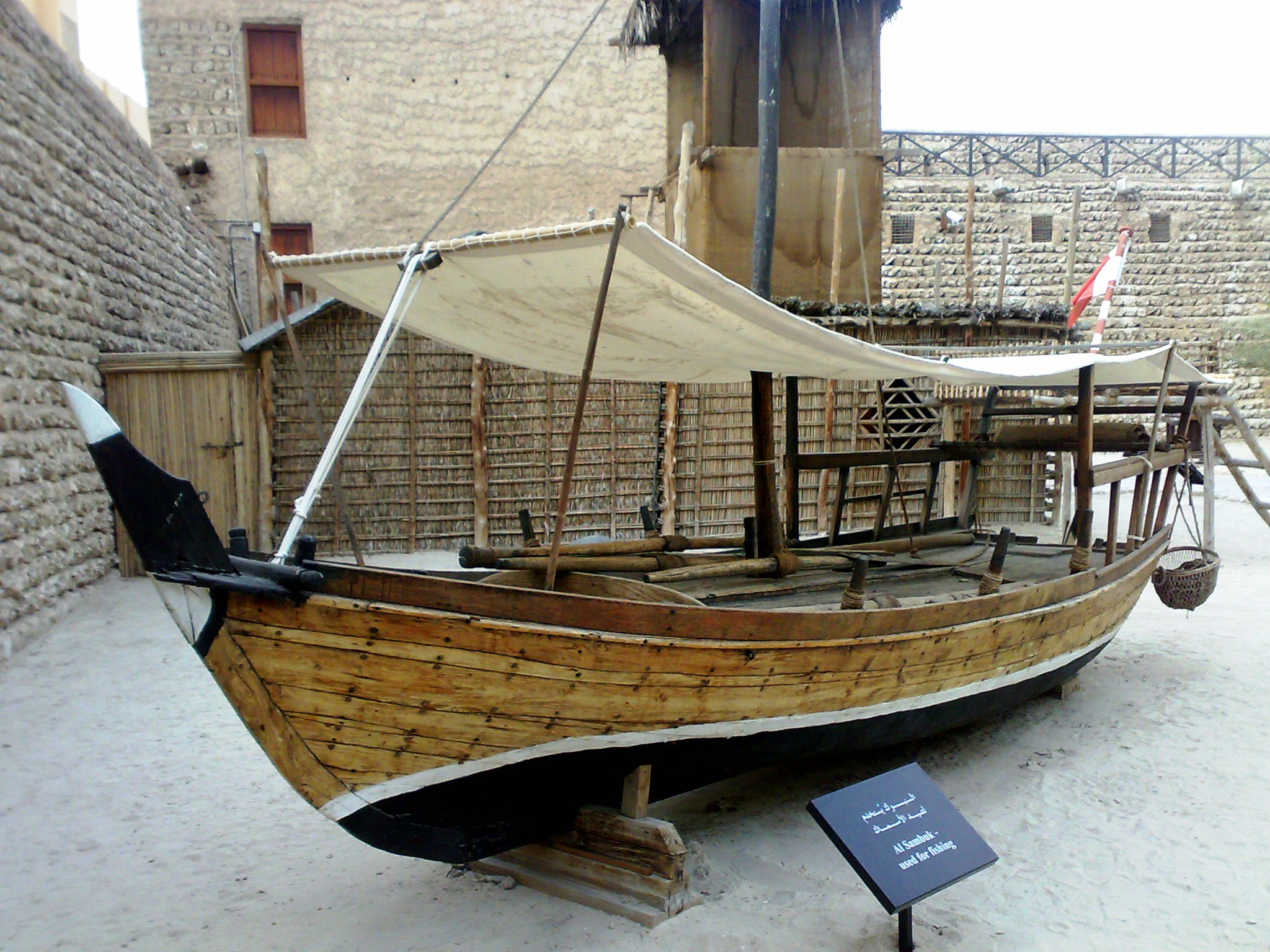
The hull of a small sanbuk at the Dubai Museum, Al Fahidi Fort, UAE

Sanbuk (ultimately from Middle Persian sanbūk), known in New Persian as Sunbūk (سنبوک), in Turkish as Zambuk and in Arabic as Sanbūk (سنبوك), Sanbūq (سنبوق) and Ṣunbūq (صنبوق, pl. صنابق), is a type of dhow, a traditional wooden sailing vessel. It has a characteristic keel design, with a sharp curve right below the top of the prow. Formerly sanbuks had ornate carvings.

== History ==
The exact origins of the dhow are lost to history. Most scholars believe that it originated in India from 600 BC to 600 AD, although there are some who claim that the sanbuk may be derived from the Portuguese caravel. However, Portuguese caravels only appeared in the area in the late 15th century.

In the early 1330's, Ibn Battuta visited Mogadishu and recorded that it was customary for the inhabitants of the city to send out "sumbuqs" (sanbuks), described by him as small boats, to meet incoming vessels as they approached the port, reflecting the organized practice of sanbuks.

Sanbuks of different sizes were used along the coasts of the Persian Gulf and the southern Arabian Peninsula. This type of boat was widespread in Southern Arabia, in places such as Saham and Sur in Oman —where it was formerly used in pearl diving and fishing, as well as in the Yemeni coast of the Red Sea. The sanbuk is the largest type of dhow seen in the Persian Gulf today.

Usually a sanbuk had one or two masts with lateen sails, but nowadays most are motorized. It has been one of the most successful dhows in history.

== See also ==
- Dhow
