= Ahmed al-Mabaqi =

Yemeni economist and governor of the Central Bank of Yemen

Governor of the Central Bank of Yemen
- Incumbent
- Assumed office 6 December 2021
- President: Abdrabbuh Mansour Hadi, Rashad al-Alimi
- Prime Minister: Maeen Abdulmalik Saeed

Personal details
- Born: 1957 (age 68–69) Lahj Governorate

Ahmed bin Ahmed Ghaleb al-Mabaqi (born 1957) is a Yemeni economist who has been serving as governor of the Central Bank of Yemen since 6 December 2021.

== Early life and education ==
Ahmed al-Mabaqi was born 7 October 1957 in Mabaq, in Lahij Governorate in southern Yemen. He studied Economics and Financial Sciences at King Fahd University of Petroleum and Minerals and graduated in 1983.

== See also ==
- Economy of Yemen
- Yemeni rial
- Central Bank of Yemen
