= Yemeni dinar =

Former currency of Yemen

الدينار اليمني Dinar
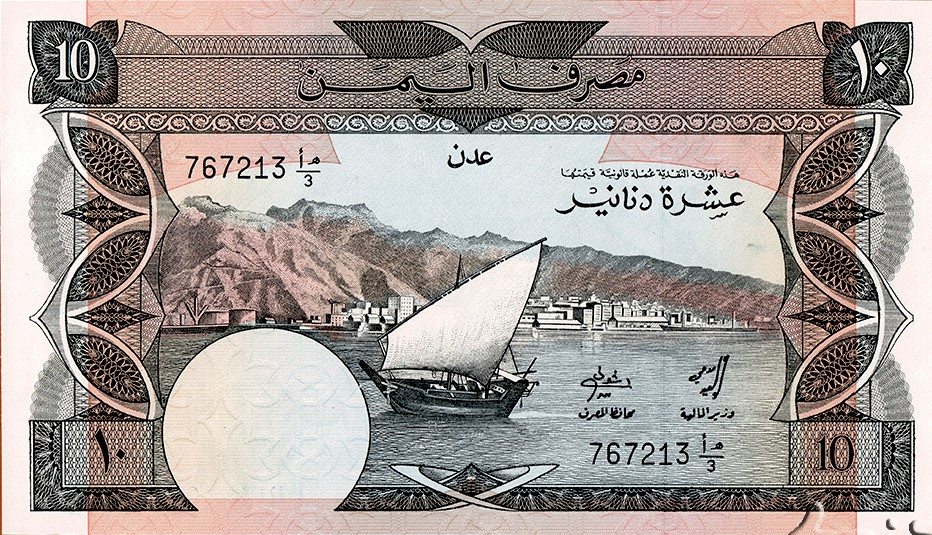
- Ten dinar banknote

ISO 4217
- Code: YDD

Units of account
- Plural: Dinars
- Symbol: £
- Subunit
- 1/1000: fils

Denominations
- Banknotes: 500 fils, £1, £5, £10
- Coins: 2 1/2, 5, 10, 50, 100, 250 fils

Demographics
- Replaced: East African shilling
- Replaced by: Yemeni rial
- User(s): South Arabia (since 1965); South Yemen; Yemen (until 11 June 1996)

Issuance
- Central bank: Bank of Yemen
- This infobox shows the latest status before this currency was rendered obsolete.

The dinar (Arabic: دينار; sign: £) was the currency of South Arabia (1965–1967), South Yemen (1967–1990), and Yemen (1990–1996) after Yemen's monetary unification on 1 July 1990.

Alongside the North Yemeni rial, it was one of the two official currencies used in Yemen until 11 June 1996. It was subdivided into 1000 fils (فلس).

== History ==
The dinar was introduced in 1965 as the South Arabian dinar, replacing the East African shilling at a rate of 1 dinar = 20 shillings, thus setting the dinar initially equal to one pound sterling, it also used the pound sign as its Latin script symbol. It was renamed to the dinar after the independence of the People's Democratic Republic of Yemen (South Yemen) in 1967. The dinar was replaced with the Yemeni rial following unification with the Yemen Arab Republic (North Yemen) in 1990. Dinar banknotes remained legal tender during a transitional period until 1996. The exchange rate during that period was 26 rials to one dinar.

For a wider history surrounding currency in the region, see British currency in the Middle East.

== Coins ==
In 1965, coins (dated 1964) were introduced for both the Federation of South Arabia and the Protectorate of South Arabia in denominations of 1, 5, 25 and 50 fils. The 1 fils was struck in aluminium, the 5 fils in bronze and the higher two denominations in cupro-nickel.

In 1971, coins were issued in the name of "Democratic Yemen", changing to the "People's Democratic Republic of Yemen" in 1973. That year, aluminium 2 1/2 fils were introduced, followed by aluminium 10 fils and cupro-nickel 100 and 250 fils in 1981. The 10 fils was scalloped shaped whilst the 100 fils was octagonal.

Image		Value	date
Obverse	Reverse	Value	date
		10 fils	1981
		50 fils	1964
		50 fils	1979
		100 fils	1981
		250 fils	1981

== Banknotes ==
On 1 April 1965, the South Arabian Currency Authority introduced notes in denominations of 250 fils, 500 fils, 1 dinar, and 5 dinars. A 10 dinar note was issued on 1 July 1967.

Image		Value	Main Colour	Description		Date of	
Obverse	Reverse	Value	Main Colour	Obverse	Reverse	Printing	Issue
		250 fils	Brown	Dhow boat with Port of Aden in background	Date Palm tree		
		500 fils	Green	Dhow boat with Port of Aden in background	Date palm, wheat		
		1 dinar	Blue	Dhow boat with Port of Aden in background Lettering: South Arabian Currency Authority This note is legal tender for One Dinar	Date palm and cotton Lettering: £1 د١		
		5 dinars	Pink	Dhow boat with Port of Aden in background	Date palm, millet and cotton		
		10 dinars	Black	Dhow boat with Port of Aden in background Lettering: South Arabian Currency Authority This note is legal tender for Ten Dinars	Date palm, cotton, maize and wheat Lettering: £10 د١٠		

In 1984, the Bank of Yemen introduced 500 fils as well as 1 dinar, 5 dinar, and 10 dinar notes that are like the preceding issues of South Arabia, except the English text and printer's imprint have been removed from the front, the name of the issuer has changed and now appears on the back, along with the name of the capital (ADEN).

Image		Value	Main Colour	Description		Date of	
Obverse	Reverse	Value	Main Colour	Obverse	Reverse	Printing	Issue
		500 fils					
		1 dinar					
		5 dinars					
		10 dinars					

Preceded by: East African shilling Ratio: 1 dinar = 20 shillings = 1 British pound	Currency of South Yemen; 1965 – 1990	Succeeded by: Yemeni rial Reason: unification with North Yemen to form Yemen; Ratio: 1 dinar = 26 rials
