= Ahmed Abdul Rahman Al-Samawi =

Yemeni economist and banker

Ahmed Abdulrahman Ali Al-Samawi
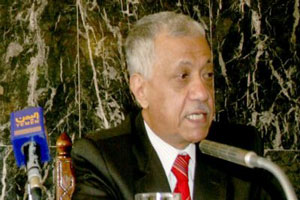
- Al-Samawi in 2012
- Born: 1946 (age 79–80); Dhamar, Yemen
- Occupation: Member of Yemeni Shura Council
- Known for: Governor of the Central Bank of Yemen, Minister of Finance, Chairman & CEO of Yemen Bank for Reconstruction and Development, Executive Director of Arab Monetary Fund (AMF)

Ahmed Abdulrahman Ali Al-Samawi (born 1946) is a Yemeni economist and banker. He was the Governor of the Central Bank of Yemen for thirteen years from May 1997 to April 2010. He was the first to prepare a scientific budget for the Republic of Yemen in 1972. He is currently a member of the 'Consultative' Shura Council of Yemen.

== Education ==
- (1976) Diploma for Advance Studies in Economics and Social Studies, The University of Manchester, U.K.
- (1969 - 1970) Diploma in Comprehensive Development, Kuwait Institute for Economic and Social Planning, Kuwait.
- (1964 - 1968) B.A. in economics, Alexandria University.
- (1960 - 1963) Secondary education, El Saidia Secondary school, Cairo, Egypt.

== Career ==
- 2010–Present – Member of the Yemeni Shura Council, Upper house of Yemen.
- 1997 - 2010 – Governor of the Central Bank of Yemen.
- 1991 - 1997 – Adviser, Presidential Council and Member of Supreme Elections Committee.
- 1985 - 1991 – Board directors, The Union of Arab and French Banks (UBAF), France.
- 1985 - 1990 – Chairman of the board of directors and CEO of Yemen Bank for Reconstruction & Development.
- 1983 - 1985 – Executive Director of Arab Monetary Fund (AMF), Abu Dhabi.
- 1980 - 1983 – Director of the Office of the Prime Minister of Yemen.
- 1978 - 1980 – Minister of Finance of North Yemen.
- 1977 - 1978 – Deputy Minister of Finance of Yemen.
- 1976 - 1977 – Chairman of the Technical Office of the Prime Minister.
- 1974 - 1976 – Deputy Minister of Finance of Yemen.
- 1972 - 1974 – Chairman of the Budget Central office.
- 1968 - 1972 – General Manager, Banking and Monetary Policy department, Ministry of Economy.

== Publications ==
=== Books ===
- 2023 – The Letters
- 2021 – Al-Kaskul (Experiences- Journeys- Stories- Banks- Money- Conferences- Messages and Images)
- 2020 – Concepts and Terminology in Economics, Finance and Banking
- 2020 – Selections from My Life
- 2018 – Public Finance- the features of the financial history of Yemen and the preparation of the first budget in its history
- 2017 – Banks History & Features and Yemen's Experience in Monetary Policy and Banking Sector Reform
- 2016 – Currency and Yemeni Heritage from Pre-Islamic Times Till Modern Era
- 2014 – Off To The Wide Universe: Memories of an Expatriate Child
- 2014 – Between the West and the East (a trip to European cities and Mumbai, India)
- 2013 – Reflections on Life and the Universe.
- 2012 – Stages in my life and taking part in building modern Yemen.
- 2007 – Yemen's experiences of monetary policy and banking reform.
- 1969 – The Ideal Use of Loans: the Development Challenge in the Yemen Arab Republic.
- 1971 – External Loans and Grants for Economic and Social Development.

=== Articles ===
- In the Age of Giant Trading Blocs, the fate of Inter-Arab Trade, Althowra Daily.
- Privatization : Selling the Public Sector to the Private Sector, Althowra Daily.

== Publications in the field of travel writing ==
- Journey to the Lost Paradise, Andalusia.
- Journey to the City of two Continents, Istanbul.
- Journey to the Paradise which Adam lost, Bali.

== Other activities ==
- Participated in several discussions of topics related to economics and Political Economy.
- Participated in several Economic conferences in Yemen and around the world.

== See also ==
- Economy of Yemen
- Yemeni rial
- Central Bank of Yemen
