= Tadhamon Bank =

Bank of Yemen

- Company type: Yemeni Stock Company
- Industry: Banking
- Founded: May 25, 1995; 31 years ago
- Headquarters: Sanaa, Yemen
- Number of locations: 24 branches
- Key people: Mahmoud Ataa Al Rafai (General Manager), Basheer Almaqtari (AGM), Osama AlAriqi, Rasheed Al-Sakkaf, Mohammed Abdulgabar (Directors)
- Number of employees: 700 (2023)
- Website: tadhamonbank.com

Tadhamon Bank is a Yemeni bank that offers retail and corporate banking and integrated investing services that abide by Islamic Banking Standards.

== History ==
Tadhamon Bank is considered one of the largest, classic banks in Yemen. It was founded in 1996 based on the Islamic Banks Law in the republic of Yemen. Tadhamon international Islamic Bank (TIIB) was established initially under the name of Yemen Islamic Bank for Investment and Development and was later renamed to TIIB (Tadhamon international Islamic Bank) to reflect its business expansion ambitions.

In 2008, the bank was rated the most efficient Islamic bank in a low-income country, and by 2009 it had become the second largest Islamic financial institution by assets in the MENA region.

As of 2022, the bank manages assets that are estimated at 497 billion YR which is approximately $2.314 billion US dollars. Its fixed capital is 20 billion Rials which is $93 million US dollars.

== Location ==
Tadhamon Bank is located in Sanaa, Republic of Yemen. It consists of 24 branches spread over most of Yemeni governorates and has more than 120 ATM machines.

== See also ==
- List of banks in Yemen
