= Yemen Commercial Bank =

Bank of Yemen

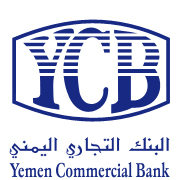
- Type: Yemeni closed joint-stock company
- Industry: Banking
- Founded: 1993 as Yemen Commercial Bank
- Headquarters: Aden, Yemen
- Key people: Sheikh/ Mohammed Bin Yahya Al-Rowaishan
- Products: Credit cards, consumer banking, corporate banking, finance and insurance, investment banking, mortgage loans, private banking, private equity, savings, Securities, asset management, wealth management

The Yemen Commercial Bank is a Yemeni closed joint-stock company established in accordance with Central Bank of Yemen's decree No 2783 dated 28/1/1993. The Bank was given the commercial permit by the Ministry of Trade and Supplies based on the Trade and Supplies Minister's decree No. 32/1993 .

An elite group of Yemeni businessmen contributed in the establishment of the Bank with 90% of the capital, and 10% belongs to the Yemeni Petroleum Company. The capital contributed to establish the Bank ran up to YR 250 million, which was larger than any capital amount paid by any Yemen-working bank in that period. The capital amount had kept on increasing to the point it reached YR 6,653,890,000 in 2009, which goes hand in hand with the requirement of the Central Bank of Yemen.

== See also ==
- List of banks in Yemen
