= List of banks in Yemen =

This is a list of banks in Yemen.

== Central bank ==
- Central Bank of Yemen

== Local banks ==
- Cooperative & Agricultural Credit Bank (CAC BANK)
- Tadhamon International Islamic Bank
- Yemen Kuwait Bank for Trade & Investment
- National Bank of Yemen
- International Bank of Yemen
- Yemen Commercial Bank
- Shamil bank of Yemen and Bahrain
- Saba Islamic Bank
- Al-Amal Microfinance Bank
- Islamic Bank of Yemen for Finance & Investment
- AL-Kuraimi Islamic Microfinance Bank
- Qasemi Islamic Microfinance Bank
- Arab Bank - Yemen Branch

== See also ==
- List of banks in the Arab world
