= North Yemeni rial =

Former currency of Yemen

ريال يمني (Arabic)
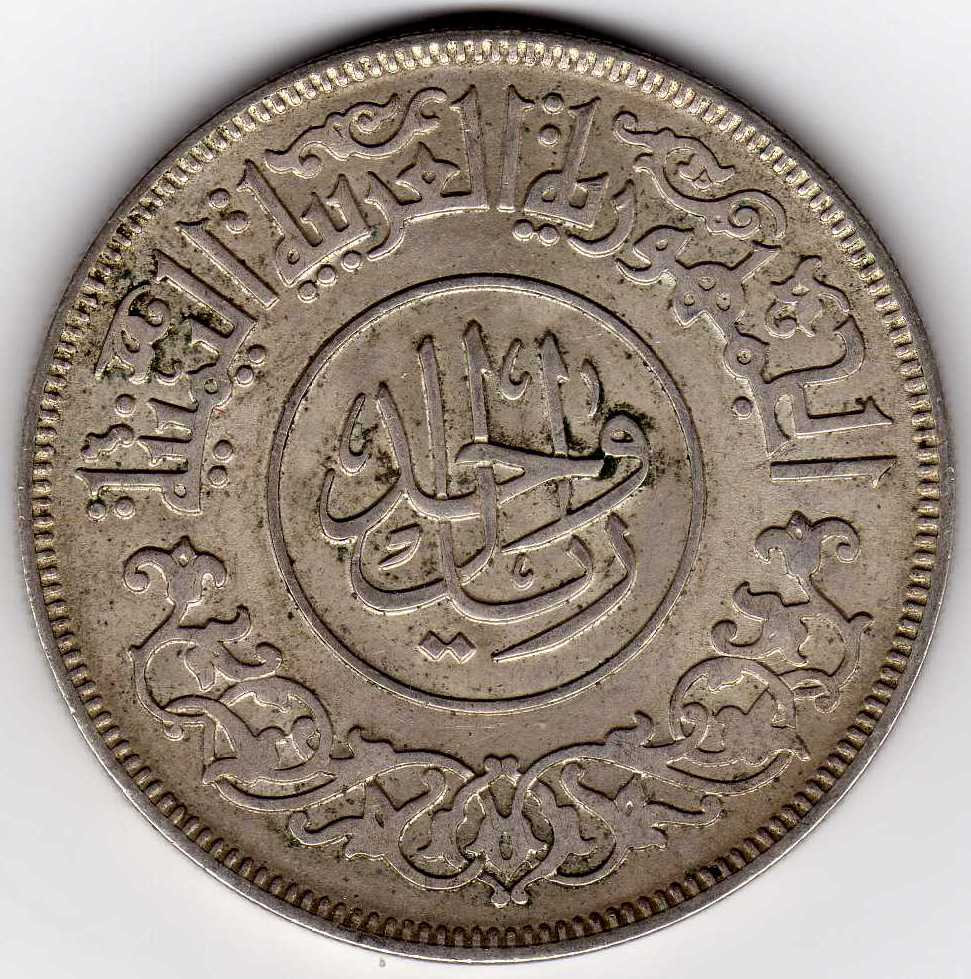
- 1 rial

ISO 4217
- Code: YER
- Subunit: 0.01

Denominations
- Subunit
- 1/100: fils
- Banknotes: 1, 5, 10, 20, 50, 100 rial
- Coins: 1, 5, 10, 25, 50 fils, 1 rial

Demographics
- Replaced by: Yemeni rial
- User(s): Kingdom of Yemen; North Yemen; Yemen (until 11 June 1996)

Issuance
- Central bank: Central Bank of Yemen
- Website: www.centralbank.gov.ye
- This infobox shows the latest status before this currency was rendered obsolete.

The rial or riyal was the currency of North Yemen, first the Kingdom of Yemen, then the Yemen Arab Republic. It is the predecessor to the modern Yemeni rial.

== History ==
The Mutawakkilite Kingdom began issuing coins around the turn of the 20th century. The rial was divided into 160 zalat, 80 halala or 40 buqsha. During the reign of Imam Yahya, the first rial coins were issued. Denominations were given on coins as a fraction of the rial, with the "honorific" Imadi appearing on the coins of Imam Yahya and Ahmadi on the coins of Imam Ahmad. Consequently, the currency is sometimes referred to as the "Imadi rial" or "Ahmadi rial".

A modern-style coinage was introduced into circulation in 1963, following the establishment of the Yemen Arab Republic. The country was one of the last to adopt a decimal currency system. In 1974 the rial was divided into 100 fils, although inflation caused the fils denominations to disappear from circulation.

After the unification of Yemen, the Yemeni rial replaced the North Yemeni rial at par. Denominations issued by the Yemen Arab Republic ceased to be legal tender afterward.

== Coins ==
In the reign of Imam Yahya (1904–1948), bronze coins were issued for the 1 zalat, 1 halala and 1 buqsha denominations, and silver coins for the 1 buqsha, 1/20, 1/10, 1/8, 1/4 and 1 rial denominations. During the reign of Imam Yahya's successor, Imam Ahmad (1948–1962), the silver 1 buqsha and 1/20 rial were discontinued, and 1/16 and 1/2 rial coins were introduced. Unusually, the 1/16 and 1/8 rial coins were pentagonal.

Gold coins denominated in guineas were also minted, primarily for presentation purposes.

In 1962, the Arab Republic first issued bronze 1/2 and 1 buqsha, 1/20, 1/10, 2/10 and 1/4 rial in a similar style to those of the last king. These were followed in 1963 by a new coinage, consisting of aluminium-bronze 1/2, 1, and 2 buqsha and silver 5, 10 and 20 buqsha and 1 rial coins.

In 1974, decimalized coinage was introduced, consisting of aluminium 1 fils, brass 5 and 10 fils coins, and cupro-nickel 25 and 50 fils coins. Cupro-nickel 1 rial coins followed in 1976.

== Banknotes ==
In 1964, the government introduced North Yemen's first paper money, which consisted of 1, 5, and 10 rial notes. These were followed by 10 and 20 buqsha notes in 1966, revised 1, 5, and 10 rial notes in 1969, and 20 and 50 rial notes on 13 May 1971.

The Central Bank of Yemen was established on 27 July 1971, with its headquarters in Sana'a, the capital of the Arab Republic of Yemen. The Central Bank of Yemen absorbed the functions of the Yemen Currency Board. When the Yemen Arab Republic (North Yemen) and the Democratic Republic of Yemen (South Yemen) united on 22 May 1990 to form the Republic of Yemen, the north's Central Bank of Yemen merged with the south's Bank of Yemen, and the joint venture continued to use the name Central Bank of Yemen.

Denomination	Color	Front	Back	Issue date	Size	Signature
1964 - 1967 issues
1 Rial	Green	Coat of arms	al-Musa mosque in Sana'a	08 Feb 1964	126 x 65 mm	Signed by Abdul Ghani Ali with two different titles: Minister of the Treasury (1964 issue) or Minister of the Treasury and Economy (1967 reissue)
5 Rials	Red	Coat of arms	Statue of Lion of Timna	14 Feb 1964	135 x 70 mm	Signed by Abdul Ghani Ali with two different titles: Minister of the Treasury (1964 issue) or Minister of the Treasury and Economy (1967 reissue)
10 Rials	Blue-grey	Coat of arms	Dam	14 Feb 1964	146 x 75 mm	Signed by Abdul Ghani Ali with two different titles: Minister of the Treasury (1964 issue) or Minister of the Treasury and Economy (1967 reissue)
1966 - 1971 issues
10 Buqshas	Orange-brown	Statue of Lion of Timna	Dedication stone from Barran temple	21 Feb 1966	126 x 65 mm	Signed by Ahmad al-Ruhumi as Minister of the Treasury.
20 Buqshas	Green	Statue of a head	Ruins of Bara'an Temple	21 Feb 1966	126 x 65 mm	Signed by Ahmad al-Ruhumi as Minister of the Treasury.
1 Rial	Green	Statue of a head	al-Musa mosque in Sana'a	08 Apr 1969	126 x 65 mm	Signed by Ahmad Abdu Said as Minister of the Treasury and Economy.
5 Rials	Red	Lion head sculpture	Statue of Lion of Timna	08 Apr 1969	136 x 70 mm	Signed by Ahmad Abdu Said as Minister of the Treasury and Economy.
10 Rials	Blue-grey	al-Shadhili mosque	Dam	08 Apr 1969	136 x 70 mm	Signed by Ahmad Abdu Said as Minister of the Treasury and Economy.
20 Rials	Purple, blue, yellow, pink	Palace on the rock at Dar al-Hajar	Skyline of Sana'a	13 May 1971	147 x 65 mm	Signed by Ahmad Abdu Said as Minister of the Treasury and Economy.
50 Rials	Green, yellow, pink, blue	Crossed jambiyas	Coffee beans and mountain range	13 May 1971	147 x 65 mm	Signed by Ahmad Abdu Said as Minister of the Treasury and Economy.

== Value ==
Value	Obverse	Reverse
1 rial		
