= National Bank of Yemen =

Bank of Yemen

The National Bank of Yemen is fully state-owned under the supervision of the Minister of Finance. Its head office is in Crater, Aden, Republic of Yemen. It was established in 1969 and now has 27 branches in 11 major cities in Yemen, and a branch on the Isle of Socotra.

== History ==
In 1969, the People's Democratic Republic of Yemen nationalised all the branches of foreign banks in Aden, including the branches belonging to Arab Bank, Bank of India, British Bank of the Middle East (BBME), Chartered Bank, Habib Bank, National and Grindlays Bank. The next year, National Bank of Southern Yemen incorporated all the banks in the country; this is now National Bank of Yemen.

== See also ==
- List of banks in Yemen
