= Environmental issues in Yemen =

Located in West Asia, Yemen's environmental issues involve mainly water scarcity, environmental pollution, and climate change. However, UNDP reported in 2023 that years of humanitarian and development crises undermine socio-economic development and worsen environmental conditions. A 2024 report ranked Yemen 163 out of 166 countries in terms of progress to meet Sustainable Development Goals.

Yemen has signed several international agreements: The Montreal Protocol, United Nations Framework Convention on Climate Change (UNFCCC), Stockholm Convention on Persistent Organic Pollutants, Vienna Convention for the Protection of the Ozone Layer, Kyoto Protocol, Civil Responsibility for Damage from Oil Pollution, and Paris Agreement.

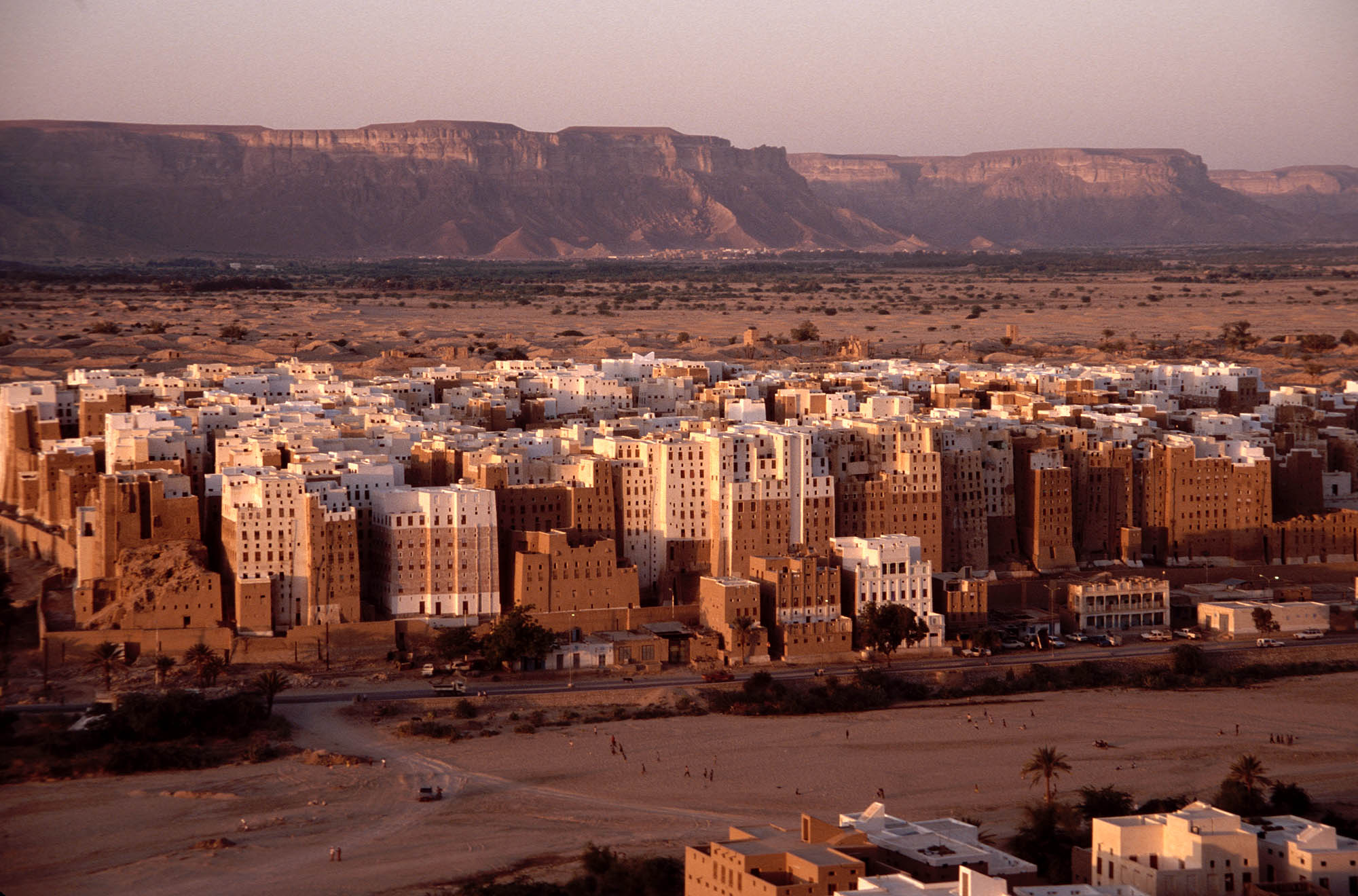
Shibam Wadi Hadhramaut Yemen

== Geography of Yemen ==
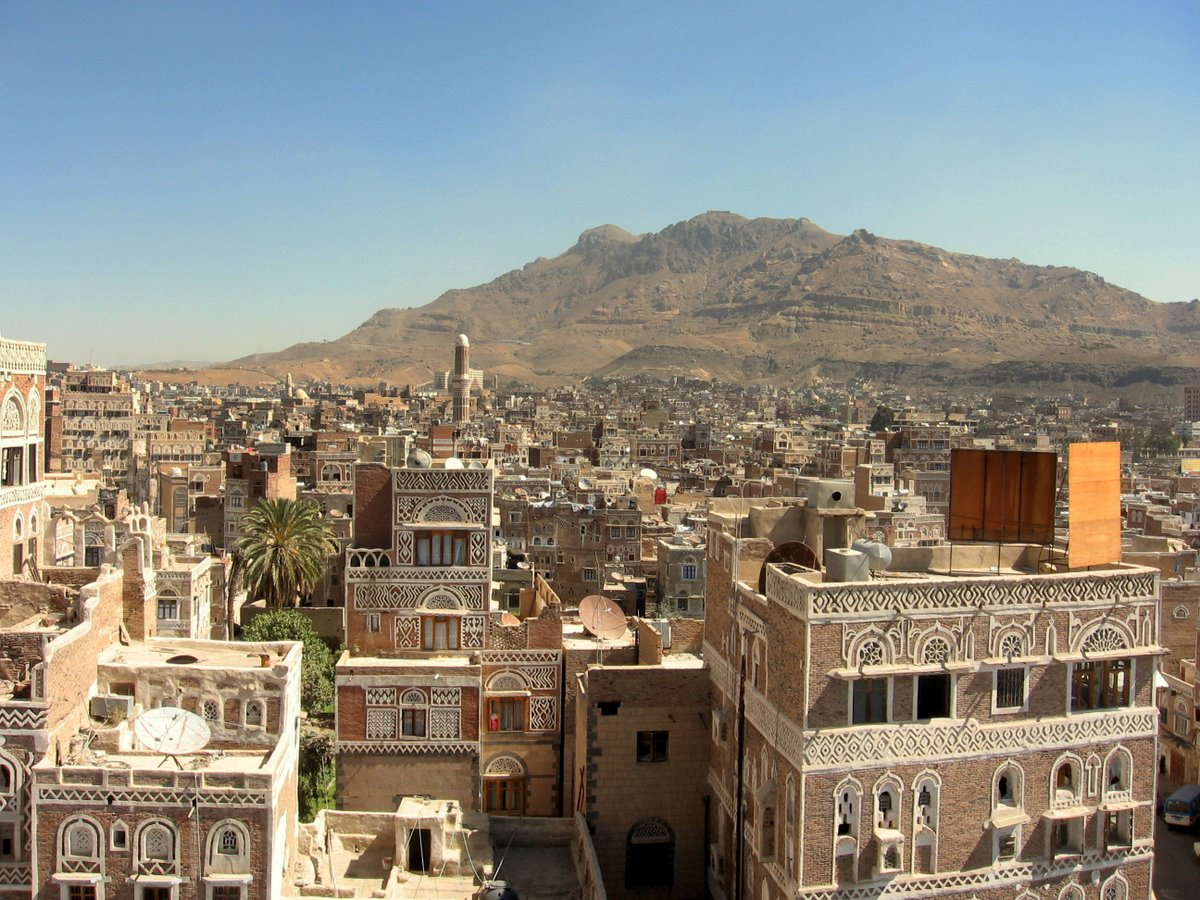
The city of Sana'a

The geography of Yemen is defined by its mountainous terrain. Despite 57% of total land area being desert, Yemen has many ecosystems and habitats. Coastal mangroves, shrub lands, and dunes from the coastal plains to the eastern deserts, rangelands comprising 40% of Yemen's territory. Mountain ranges create a diversity in climates and landscapes. About 3% of the land arable, providing a rich variety of natural habitats, species and genetic diversity, including many endemic species.

Alongside its diverse land geology, Yemen hosts 2,500 km long coastline, featuring elements of coral reefs to rocky and sandy coasts. Dependent on factors like elevation in the highlands or distance from the sea in coastal areas, in the winter, highland temperatures can drop below 15 °C (59 °F) and reach 25 °C (77 °F) in the summer, in coastal areas these temperatures are respectively 22.5 °C (72.5 °F) in the winter to 35 °C (95 °F) in the summer. From 1991 to 2020, average precipitation is 190.01 millimeters, though precipitation tends to decline from west to east, and central areas receive relatively low amounts of precipitation dependent on elevation and time of year.

== Climate change ==
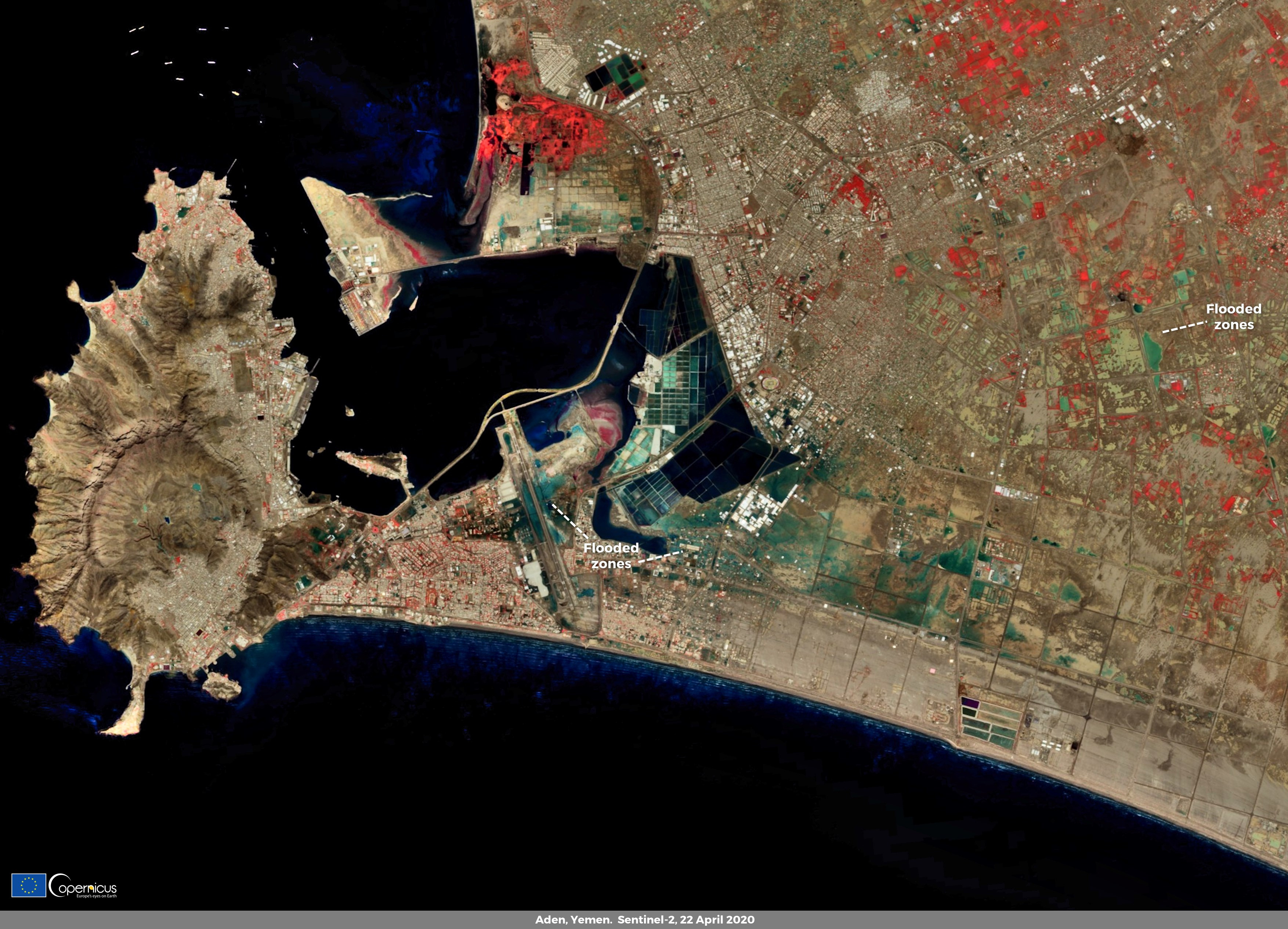
Impact of 2020 flooding in Yemen

Yemen is highly vulnerable to drought, extreme flooding, pests, sudden disease outbreaks, changes of rainfall patterns, increased storm frequency and/or severity, and sea level rise, despite being one of the lowest GHG emitting countries in the world. It is the 22nd most vulnerable and 12th least ready country to respond to the effects of climate change.

Indeed, UNDP reported in 2023 that temperatures across Yemen have been rising for at least six decades and are expected to continue warming through 2050. A recent report ranked Yemen 163 out of 166 countries in terms of progress to meet Sustainable Development Goals.

Yemen's economy is based on agriculture and small-scale farming, and its agriculture is highly vulnerable to climate change. Over 75% of the Yemeni population engages in rural-based farming and pastoralism, relying on favorable climatic conditions for economic sustenance.

One of the sectors highly affected by climate change is beekeeping. Dating back to the 10th century BC, beekeeping and honey production are an ancient practice in Yemen and, dependent on climatic and environmental factors now highly vulnerable to climate change, produce some of the world's finest and most expensive honey. Climate change and conflict in Yemen now jeopardize the livelihoods of 100,000 families in the Yemeni beekeeping business. Once valued at $500 million annually, frequent floods, extreme weather, and escalating urbanization degrade bee pastures and damage beehives, potentially resulting in a 30% drop due to the decreased honey yields. Many beekeepers, like Laila Sinan from Sana'a, struggle to sustain their bees, feeding them artificially because of the harsh weather.

Livestock farming is a critical livelihood for many Yemenis, with nearly 70% of households participating in the sector and around 25% relying on the sale of livestock products as a primary or secondary source of income. However, climate change poses significant threats to this vital industry. Rising temperatures increase the risk of diseases that affect livestock health, while environmental degradation and desertification are reducing the availability of grazing land. Additionally, natural disasters such as floods can lead to the direct loss of livestock, further destabilizing livelihoods and food security in affected regions. These challenges highlight the urgent need for sustainable environmental management to protect Yemen's agricultural and pastoral economies.

Flooding has become a significant environmental and humanitarian challenge in Yemen, exacerbating the struggles of a population already burdened by conflict. In recent years, floods have claimed the lives of hundreds of Yemenis and affected hundreds of thousands more, including many who were already displaced or vulnerable due to ongoing conflict. These natural disasters not only cause direct loss of life but also destroy homes, infrastructure, and livelihoods, compounding the challenges faced by affected communities. These natural disasters not only destroy homes and livelihoods but also create conditions conducive to the spread of diseases such as dengue fever, which has surged in flood-affected areas. Stagnant water left by floods provides a breeding ground for disease-carrying mosquitoes, intensifying health risks for already vulnerable communities. YEMEN

== War and humanitarian crises ==
Yemen is facing one of the largest humanitarian crises in this world. The conflict in Yemen has escalated into a dire humanitarian crisis, with over 23.4 million people, including 12.9 million children, in need of assistance. Malnutrition rates have soared, with around 2.2 million children acutely malnourished, and nearly 500,000 children facing severe malnutrition. Access to clean water, sanitation, and healthcare has deteriorated, leading to the spread of preventable diseases such as cholera. Education has also suffered, with over 2 million children out of school due to damaged infrastructure and insecurity, severely impacting Yemen's future generations.

== Water issues ==
Water issues in Yemen are based on two aspects: water shortage and water quality.

Yemen is the sixth most water stressed country in the world.

Yemen has suffered from intense water shortages owing to its climate, water mismanagement, and population growth. Projected to deplete it's water resources in 2017, the capital Sana'a has not yet run out of water but still continues to grapple with critical shortages, losing four to six meters of groundwater per year. As a result, residents are forced to seek alternative water sources. The ongoing conflict has exacerbated the situation, with over 16 million Yemenis lacking access to safe drinking water due to damaged infrastructure and limited access to safe water, reaching over 30% of the population.

=== Impact of conflict and humanitarian conflict ===
Yemen's long-running war has destroyed the country's water infrastructure, making contamination and shortages worse. Millions of people have less access to clean water as a result of attacks on water facilities by both sides of the conflict. Over 1.9 million probable cases of cholera have been documented since 2017 as a result of the devastation of sanitation systems. Conflict-related displacement has also put more strain on host communities' limited water supplies.

=== Agricultural impact on water quality ===
While the global average of the agricultural impact on water withdrawal is 70%, in Yemen, agriculture accounts for 90–95% of water withdrawal. Qat (Catha edulis, Bushman's Tea), a mild narcotic plant with high market value, consumes over 40% of Yemen's renewable water resources and over a quarter (32%) of all groundwater in the country, taking five years to grow. Qat production also uses over 80 different pesticides to increase yields and preserve freshness, though the effects on groundwater are likely to be significant but currently unknown and understudied. The overproduction of Qat, a non-nutritive cash crop, worsens food insecurity and strains water systems. The overreliance and overproduction of Qat exacerbates water insecurity in Yemen, directly contributing to the humanitarian crises in the country. 17.8 million people lack access to safe water and adequate sanitation services in Yemen, forcing millions, including women and children, to walk for miles to find water. To facilitate and transition Yemeni farmers towards more sustainable food production, the transition to coffee highlights the potential for reducing water usage while boosting economic opportunities. Yemen's coffee heritage, primarily its Mocha coffee, presents a viable solution for conserving water resources and mitigating agricultural pressure on the environment. However, the shift requires overcoming cultural and economic barriers deeply rooted in Qat's societal importance.

A combination of factors, such as damaged water and sanitation infrastructure, and the ongoing humanitarian crisis from prolonged conflict have led to a cholera outbreak, one of the worst in modern history, affecting over 2.5 million people and leading to thousands of lives lost since 2016. The lack of adequate healthcare services has further compounded the crisis as hospitals and clinics struggle to manage the abundance of cases. To support relief efforts, the World Health Organization (WHO) and the King Salman Humanitarian Aid and Relief Center (KSrelief) have initiated projects rehabilitating water infrastructure, improving access to safe water, and promoting hygiene practices to reduce the risk of cholera transmission. While these interventions have mitigated some impacts, the outbreak underscores Yemen's broader environmental challenges, particularly those tied to water scarcity and infrastructure degradation.

=== Health issues ===
Waterborne diseases such as cholera, hepatitis A, and typhoid fever all pose significant public health challenges for Yemen. The lack of access to clean water and adequate sanitation facilities has been a major factor in the spread of these diseases. As of 2023, approximately 15.3 million Yemenis are at risk of contracting waterborne diseases due to insufficient water, sanitation, and hygiene (WASH) services.

Environmental pollution further exacerbates the spread of disease from water quality issues. Studies have shown that leachate from the lbb landfill contains high concentrations of pollutants, including heavy metals, which exceed the permissible limits set by Yemen's Ministry of Water and Environment. This leachate poses a significant risk to groundwater, surface water, and soil quality in the region. The contamination of water sources by landfill leachate contributes to the proliferation of waterborne diseases, highlighting the urgent need for improved waste management and environmental protection measures in Yemen.

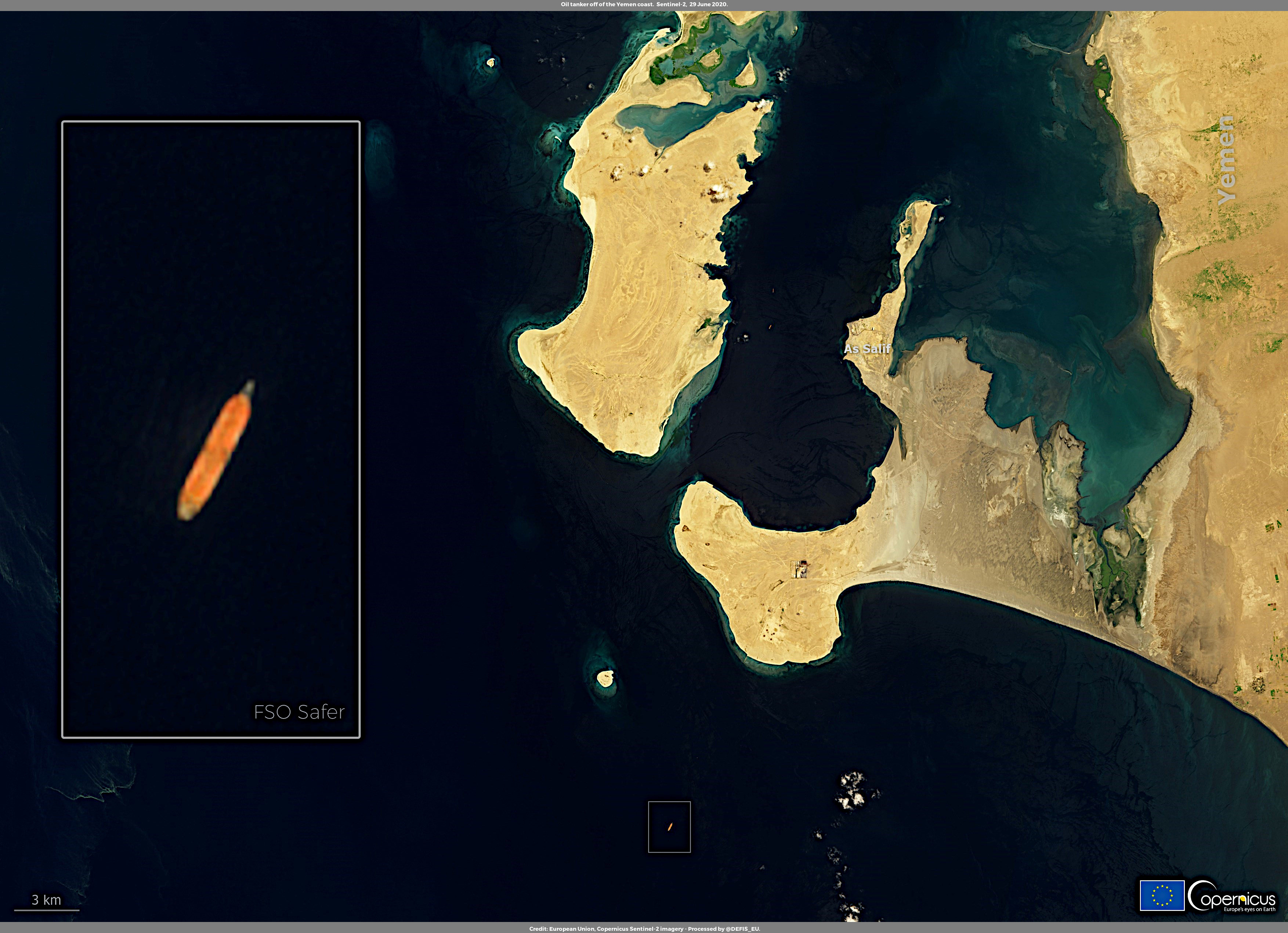
Oil tanker FSO Safer off the Yemen coast

== Pollution ==
The FSO Safer, a deteriorating oil tanker moored off Yemen's Red Sea coast, poses a significant environmental threat due to its potential to cause a massive oil spill. The vessel holds about 150,000 tons of crude oil but is structurally weak due to prolonged neglect and ongoing conflict. An oil spill from the Safer could devastate marine ecosystems, fisheries, and coastal communities, exacerbating Yemen's humanitarian crisis. Access restrictions and security issues have hampered international efforts to address the situation, underscoring the complex interplay between environmental hazards and geopolitical instability in the region.

== Policy ==
Yemen's water and sanitation sector faces significant challenges due to conflict, infrastructure damage, and resource scarcity. Reforms introduced under the National Water Sector Strategy and Investment Program (NWSSIP) in 2004 aimed to decentralize, corporatize, and commercialize water services, with private sector involvement to enhance efficiency and service delivery. However, ongoing conflict since 2015 has severely hindered progress, leaving millions without reliable access to clean water. Recent efforts include empowering local water and sanitation corporations, rehabilitating damaged infrastructure, and revising policies for sustainable water management.

To combat the spread of waterborne diseases like the cholera outbreak, humanitarian organizations have made significant strides in approving water quality and access. The Yemen Relief and Reconstruction Foundation has distributed thousands of water filters to displaced individuals and communities, ensuring access to clean drinking water. UNICEF has implemented solar-powered wells and purification initiatives, providing sustainable solutions for water supply in undeserved areas. Additionally, the World Health Organization (WHO), in partnership with KSrelief, has prioritized improving water infrastructure, chlorinating water supplies, and conducting awareness campaigns to prevent cholera's spread.

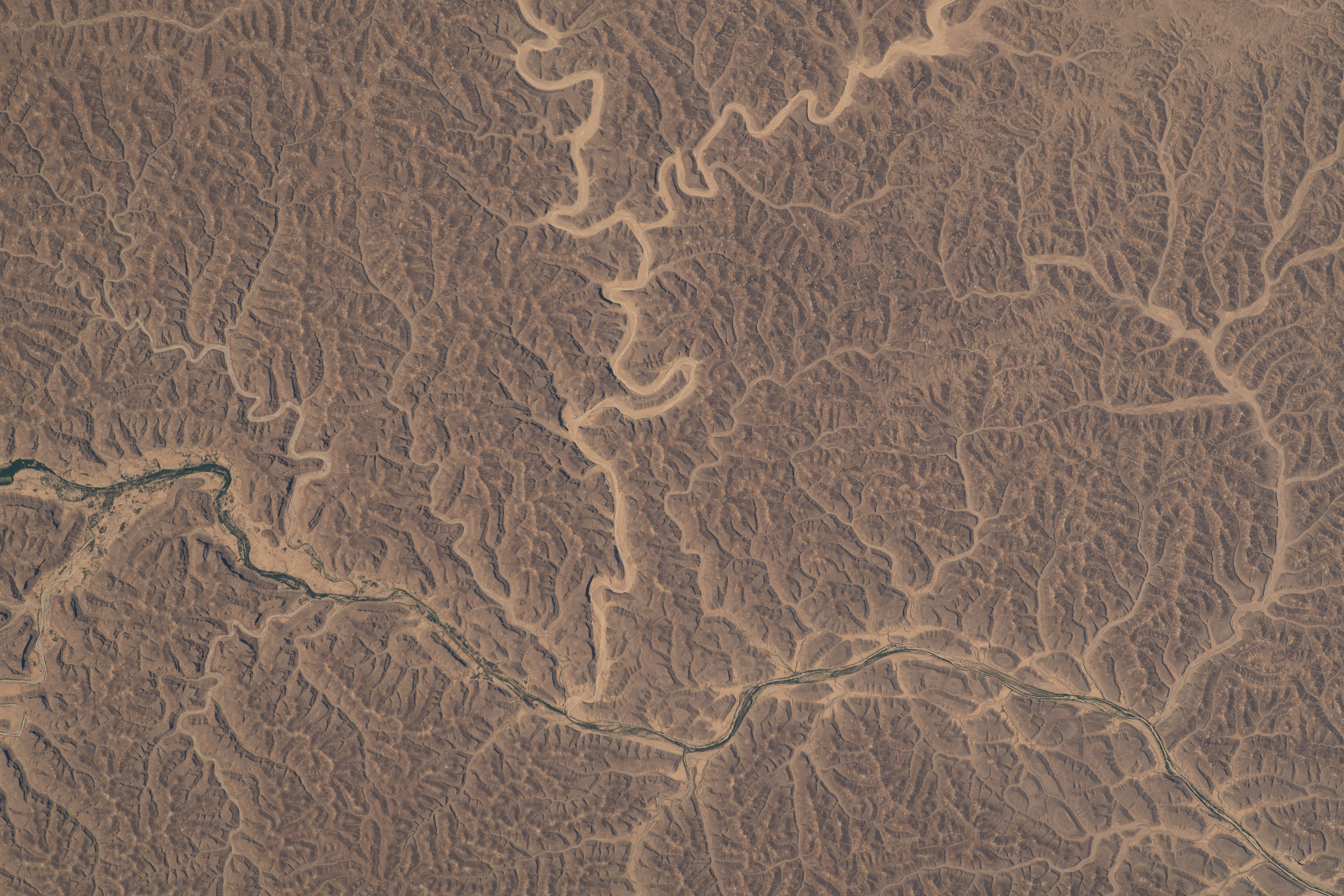
Wadis in the desert ecosystems of Yemen

== Desertification ==
Overgrazing of pastureland is a large issue. Soil erosion and desertification are also hazards in Yemen. Agricultural lands in Yemen are subject to various degrees of degradation and decline of soil productivity. Desertification largely threatens the natural resource-base.

The UNDP report on climate change in Yemen, desertification is a major environmental issue intensified by climate change and human activities. The country faces severe droughts, unpredictable rainfall, and higher temperatures, all contributing to the degradation of arid and semi-arid land that makes up over 90% of its territory. This loss of arable land impacts agricultural productivity, exacerbates water scarcity, and increases food insecurity. The ongoing desertification process also strains Yemen's already limited resources, fueling conflict and social instability. Efforts to address this challenge focus on climate adaptation and sustainable resource management to support long-term human development.

=== Actions to combat desertification ===
Yemen's approach to tackling desertification centers on safeguarding its agricultural lands and optimizing scarce water resources. Key strategies include reforestation and soil conservation, aimed at enhancing long-term land productivity. A collaborative approach empowers local communities to become stewards of the land, integrating their knowledge into sustainable practices. What stands out is the emphasis on environmental education, underscoring the need for public awareness in creating resilient landscapes. These initiatives align with regional partnerships, reflecting a unified effort to counter the impact of desertification across Yemen's vulnerable ecosystems.

=== Food insecurity ===
Desertification in Yemen significantly undermines food security by decreasing the amount of arable land available for farming, which in turn lowers crop yields. As soil quality declines and water becomes scarcer, farmers struggle to maintain production, leaving the population more susceptible to hunger and malnutrition. This cycle of land degradation and reduced productivity deepens Yemen's food insecurity, posing a critical threat to its already vulnerable communities.

== Waste management ==
Yemen's waste management system faces severe limitations due to prolonged conflict, economic instability, and limited resources. Yemen's City Cleaning and Improvement Funds (CCIFs), which are responsible for waste management services, have restricted operational capacity and funding shortages. These services in Yemen have been in place for years but faced challenges, hindered the ability of local service providers to maintain and expand waste collection. Public health risks grew and has impacting Yemen's most vulnerable communities.

These challenges have led to issues such as uncollected waste and unmanaged landfills. (CITE) In response, initiatives like those from the Global Partnership for Results-Based Approaches (GPRBA) are helping improve waste management infrastructure in key cities like Sana’a and Aden, providing necessary equipment and encouraging gender inclusivity within technical roles.

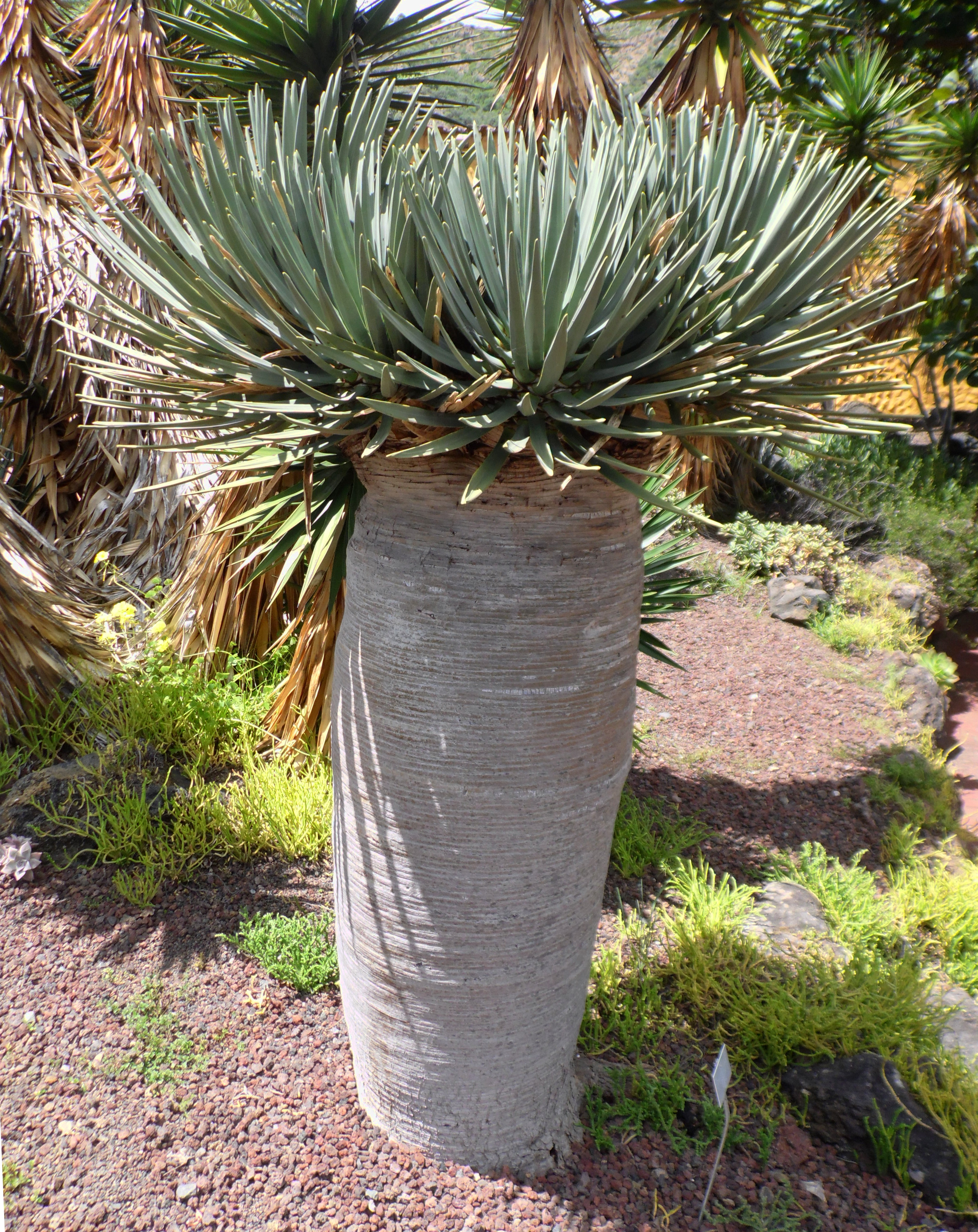
Dracaena cinnabari (Dragon's Blood Tree), an endemic plant in Yemen

== Biodiversity ==
Yemen's ecosystems and biodiversity are under serious threat due to climate change, environmental degradation, and continuing social-political issues. The country is home to unique species, making conservation crucial for protecting its biodiversity. However, growing pressures like habitat loss, unsustainable resource use, and changing climate patterns make it increasingly difficult to sustain Yemen's natural resources.

Efforts, including the National Biodiversity Strategy and Action Plan (NBSAP), focus on creating protected areas, conserving agricultural biodiversity, and encouraging sustainable practices. With support from international organizations like the United Nations Development Programme (UNDP) and the Global Environment Facility (GEF), Yemen aims to strengthen local conservation efforts and manage natural resources more sustainably.

== Sustainable development goals ==
The Yemeni government faces critical issues, including water scarcity, declining oil reserves, and political instability. Its National Assessment of Sustainable Development emphasizes aligning social and environmental goals with economic growth, social progress, and efficient resource use. The Millennium Development Goals (MDGs) helped Yemen advance in poverty reduction, education, and healthcare. Building on MDGs, Yemen's Sustainable Development Goals (SDGs) focus on climate action, renewable energy, and sustainable agriculture to strengthen resilience and expand access to essential services, especially in the context of ongoing humanitarian challenges.
