= Cisterns of Tawila =

Historic site in Aden, Yemen

Coordinates: 12.7743°N 45.0290°E

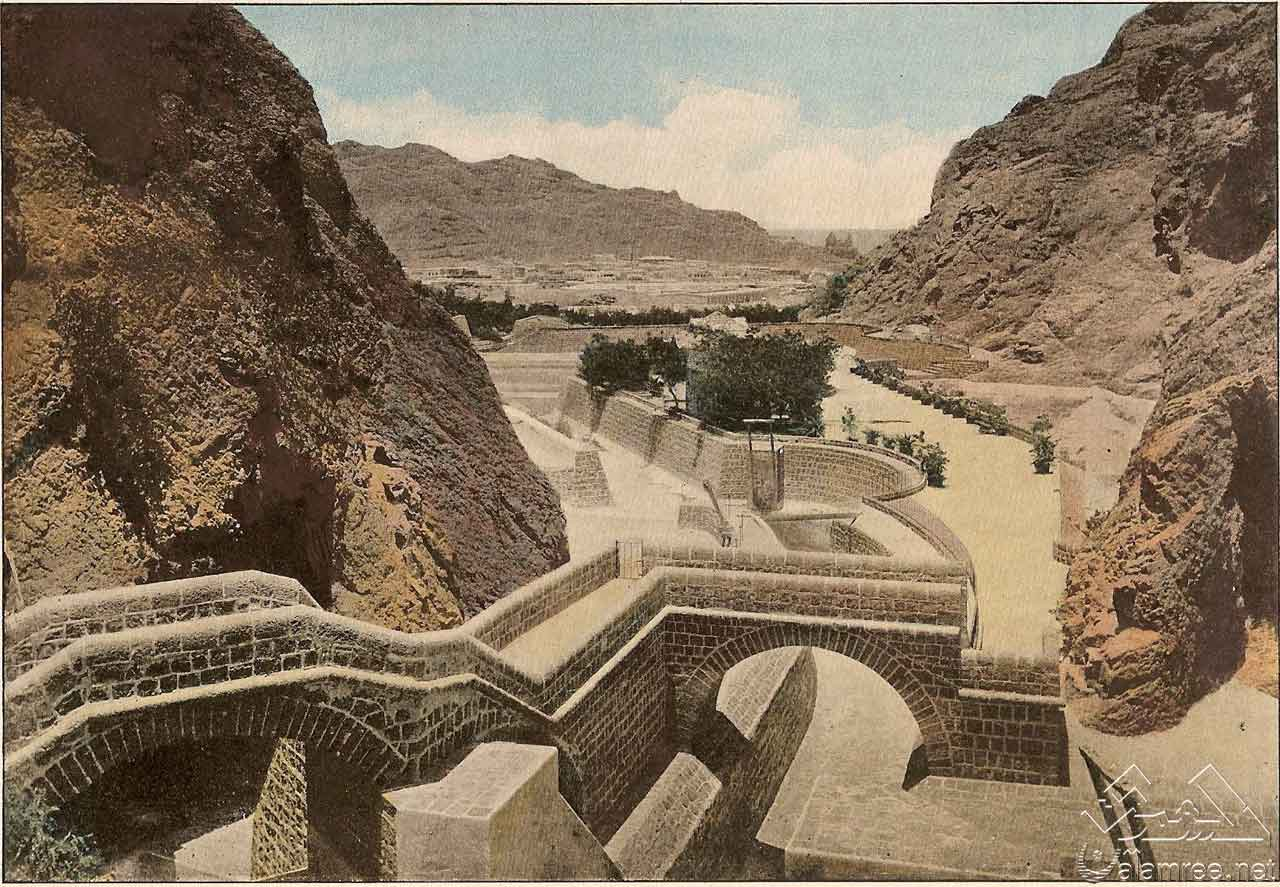
drawing of Cisterns of Tawila

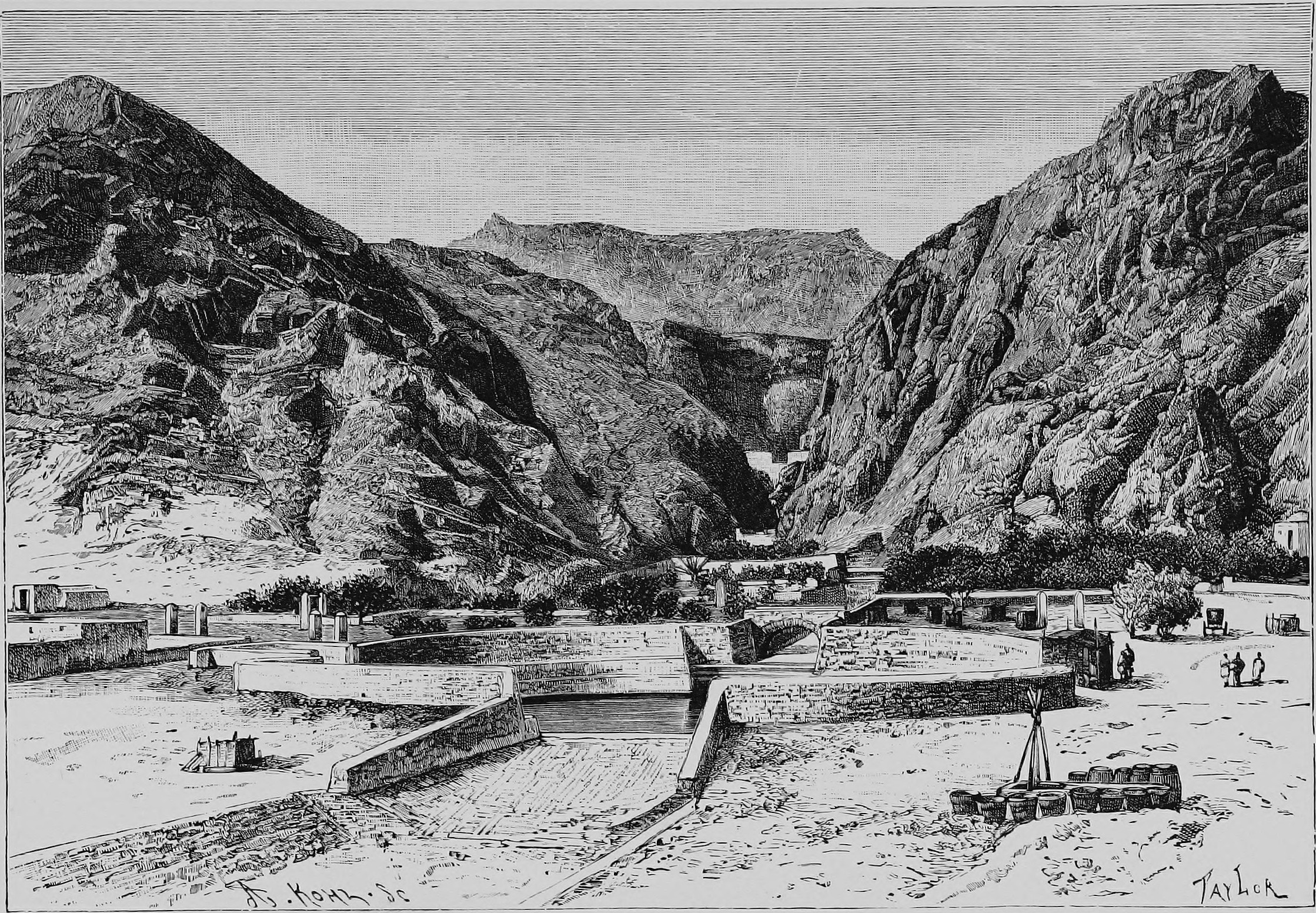
Old picture of the Cisterns.

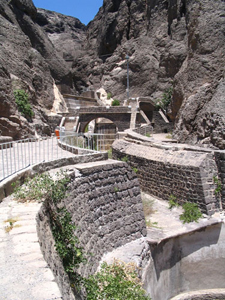
View of Cisterns looking towards Jebal Shamsan

The Cisterns of Tawila, or the Tawila Tanks, is a historic site in Aden, Yemen designed to collect and store the rain that flows down from the Shamsan massif through Wadi Tawila, and to protect the city from periodic flooding. The site consists of a series of tanks of varying shape and capacity. They are connected to one another and located in Wadi Tawila to the southwest of Aden’s oldest district, Crater. Originally there were about 53 tanks, but only 13 remain following a succession of renovations, including those done by the British in the 19th century. The existing tanks have a combined capacity of about nineteen million gallons. The largest of the tanks are the Coghlan Tank at the center of the main site and the large, circular Playfair Tank, located at the lowest point, outside the main site.

== History ==
The tanks were hewn from the volcanic rocks of Wadi Tawila and then lined with a special stucco that included volcanic ash to create a strong, natural cement that rendered the tanks' walls impermeable in order to retain water for extended periods.

Visitors to the Tanks are often surprised by the words on a plaque near the Coghlan Tank: "Regarding the original construction of which nothing is accurately known..." There is indeed little hard evidence and there are few reliable sources of information about the Tanks. One favored hypothesis is that Himyar, a pre-Islamic Arabian kingdom that ruled parts of Yemen from 115 B.C. to 525 A.D., started to build water tanks in the area that eventually became the Cisterns of Tawila. The Himyarites are known to have employed water-catchment tanks in other areas under their rule. The proposed Himyaritic origins of the tanks may help explain a recessed, rectangular area in the Coghlan tank that, according to the Director of the site, could have been used in pre-Islamic times for animal sacrifice (a ritual that the Himyarites were known to perform for a variety of occasions, including drought).

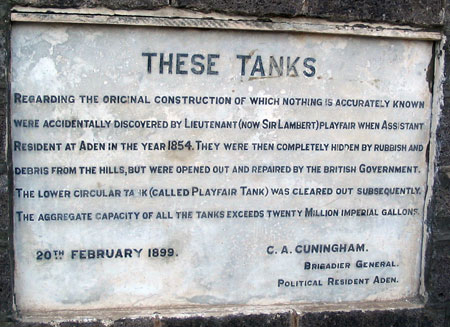

The Tanks were mentioned in some manuscripts after the coming of Islam to Yemen in the 7th century A.D. "Aden has Tanks that store water when the rain falls", wrote Al-Hamdani in the 10th century. Al-Makdsi, writing three centuries later, also recorded the presence of wells and cisterns in Aden. By the time of the Rasulid dynasty (1229-1454 A.D.), the Tanks had fallen into disrepair. However, the Rassulids recognized the utility of the Tanks and began to restore them. This restoration has led some to claim that the Rassulids built the Tanks, thereby obscuring what are, in all probability, the far more ancient origins of the Tanks. After the Rassulids, the Tanks once again fell into disrepair, damaged by flooding and neglect and filled with the rubble of successive floods.

By the time of the British occupation of Aden (beginning in 1839), the Tanks had been almost completely buried by debris carried down the mountains by successive floods. Sir Robert L. Playfair rediscovered the tanks and recognized their potential value. Aden had no fresh water and was often cut off from mainland water supplies by hostile tribes. Playfair hoped that the Tanks, once repaired, could provide a reliable source of water for public consumption. The British accordingly set out to restore the tanks to their original function. However, in the process, the British modified the design and layout of the Tanks significantly from their original state. With the intention of storing the greatest quantity of water possible, British engineers replaced an intricate network of numerous, small, cascading cisterns along the valley walls with a few, larger tanks. The Tanks' ability to both control floods and store water was thus hampered, and the site that tourists visit today is very much a Victorian British creation. Further, the remodeling destroyed what archaeological evidence might have been present with regards to the original site, and this, coupled with the scarcity of documentary evidence, has made learning more about the Tanks' origins difficult.

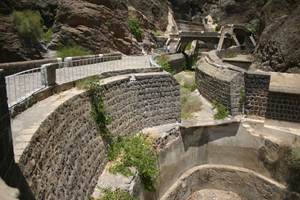
Close-up of Cisterns

Today, the cisterns are primarily a public park and a tourist attraction. They have not been filled for at least fifteen years and do not serve the city's water needs. They may still help with flooding, although the presence of structures in the saila, or flood course, that leads from the Tanks to the sea, impedes the flow of water. No significant restoration work has been conducted on the Tanks since the British colonial era ended in 1967. Time, floods, and visitors have taken their toll on the structures. In addition, construction on the tableland above the Tanks may threaten the entire system of wadis and dams that help channel floodwaters into the Tanks. The future of the Tanks remains uncertain.
