= Economy of Yemen =

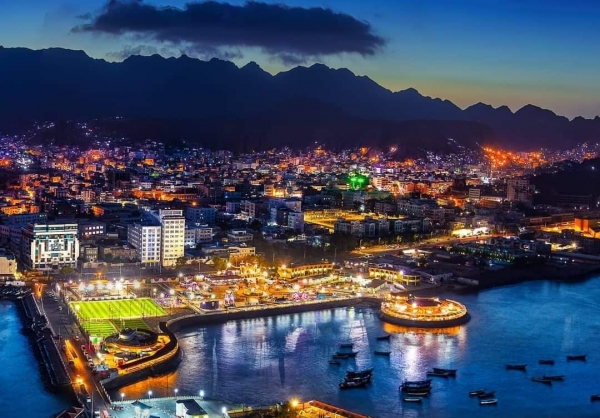
- Aden — the commercial port city of Yemen
- Currency: Yemeni rial (YER, ر.ي)
- Fiscal year: Calendar year
- Trade organisations: WTO, CAEU, G77
- Country group: Least Developed; Low-income economy

Statistics
- Population: ▲34.4 million (2023)
- GDP: ▼$17.240 billion (nominal, 2026 est.); ▲$71.175 billion (PPP, 2026 est.)
- GDP rank: 142nd (nominal, 2026); 120th (PPP, 2026)
- GDP growth: -1.0% (2024)
- GDP per capita: ▼$401 (nominal, 2026 est.); ▼$1,657 (PPP, 2026 est.)
- GDP per capita rank: 196th (nominal, 2026); 194th (PPP, 2026)
- GDP per capita growth: -2.2% (2018)
- GDP by sector: agriculture: 20.3%; industry: 11.8%; services: 67.9%; (2017 est.)
- Inflation (CPI): 14.9% (2023 est.)
- Population below national poverty line: 48.6% (2014); 18.8% on less than $1.90/day (2014)
- Gini coefficient: 36.7 medium (2014)
- Human Development Index: ▲0.470 low (2023) (184th); ▼0.325 low IHDI (2023)
- Labour force: ▲6,814,139 (2019); 31.4% employment rate (2014)
- Labour force by occupation: most people are employed in agriculture and herding; services, construction, industry, and commerce account for less than one-fourth of the labor force
- Unemployment: ▲13.6% (2022)
- Youth unemployment: ▲32.6% (2025)
- Informal employment: 77.4% (2014)
- Main industries: crude oil production and petroleum refining; small-scale production of cotton textiles, leather goods; food processing; handicrafts; aluminum products; cement; commercial ship repair; natural gas production

External
- Exports: ▼$37.5 million (2020 est.)
- Export goods: crude petroleum, gold, fish, industrial chemical liquids, scrap iron
- Main export partners: UAE 27.9%; Bangladesh 20.25%; Saudi Arabia 16.28%; Japan 16.22%; Oman 07.03% (2023)
- Imports: ▲$800.999 million (2022 est.)
- Import goods: wheat, refined petroleum, iron, rice, cars
- Main import partners: China 22.6%; UAE 14.5%; Saudi Arabia 11.1%; Pakistan 7.56%; Turkey 7.13% (2023)
- Current account: ▲ −$1.236 billion (2017 est.)
- Gross external debt: ▼$7.068 billion (31 December 2017 est.)

Public finance
- Government debt: ▲83,96% of GDP (2020 est.)
- Foreign reserves: ▼$245.4 million (31 December 2017 est.)
- Budget balance: −5.2% (of GDP) (2017 est.)
- Revenue: $2.821 billion (2017 est.)
- Spending: $4.458 billion (2017 est.)
- Economic aid: recipient: $2.3 billion (2003–07 disbursements)
- All values, unless otherwise stated, are in US dollars.

The economy of Yemen is weak and underdeveloped, even more so since the breakout of the Yemeni Civil War which then led to instability and a growing humanitarian crisis. At the time of unification, South Yemen and North Yemen had different but equally struggling underdeveloped economic systems. Since unification, the economy was further harmed by Yemen's support for Iraq during the 1990–91 Persian Gulf War because Saudi Arabia had expelled almost 1 million Yemeni workers, and both Saudi Arabia and Kuwait significantly reduced economic aid to Yemen. The 1994 civil war further drained Yemen's economy. As a consequence, Yemen relied heavily on aid from multilateral agencies to sustain its economy. In return, it pledged to implement significant economic reforms. In 1997 the International Monetary Fund (IMF) approved two programs to increase Yemen's credit significantly: the enhanced structural adjustment facility (now known as the poverty reduction and growth facility, or PRGF) and the extended funding facility (EFF). In the ensuing years, Yemen's government attempted to implement recommended reforms: reducing the civil service payroll, eliminating diesel and other subsidies, lowering defense spending, introducing a general sales tax, and privatizing state-run industries. However, limited progress led the IMF to suspend funding between 1999 and 2001.

In late 2005, the World Bank (which extended Yemen a four-year US$2.3 billion economic support package in October 2002, together with other bilateral and multilateral lenders) announced that, as a consequence of Yemen's failure to implement significant reforms, the World Bank would reduce financial aid by one-third over the period July 2005 through July 2008. A key component of the $2.3 billion package — $300 million in concessional financing — was withheld, pending the renewal of Yemen's PRGF with the IMF, which was under negotiation. However, in May 2006 the World Bank adopted an assistance strategy for Yemen providing for $400 million in International Development Association (IDA) credits in 2006-2009. In November 2006, at a meeting of Yemen's development partners, a total of $4.7 billion in grants and concessional loans was pledged for the period of the years from 2007–2010. Despite possessing significant oil and gas resources and a considerable amount of agriculturally productive land, Yemen remains one of the poorest of the world's low-income countries. In 2018, more than 80 percent (2018) of the population lived in poverty. The influx of an average 1,000 Somali refugees per month into Yemen looking for work was an added drain on the economy, which already coped with a 20 to 40 percent rate of unemployment. Yemen remained under significant pressure to implement economic reforms, lest it face the loss of badly needed international financial support.

In the north, disruptions of the civil war (1962–1970) and frequent periods of drought dealt severe blows to a previously prosperous agricultural sector. Coffee production, formerly the north's main export and principal form of foreign exchange, declined as the cultivation of khat increased. Low domestic industrial output and a lack of raw materials made the Yemeni Arab Republic dependent on a wide variety of imports.

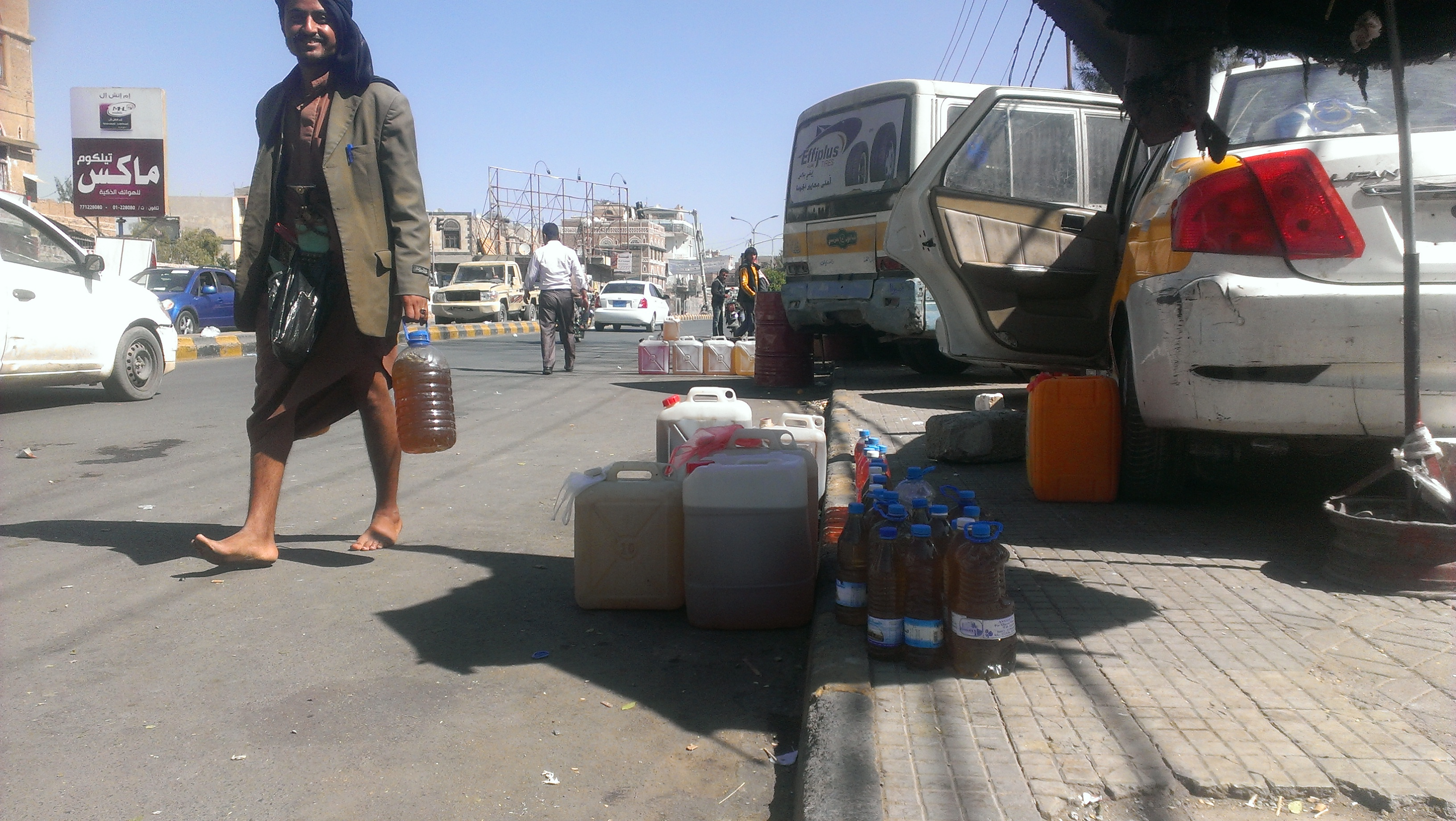
Black market fuel for sale in Sanaa during the ongoing civil war

The Yemeni Civil War and air bombing campaign by the coalition during the Saudi-led intervention devastated the Yemeni economy further.

As a result of civil war, Yemen suffered from inflation and devaluation of the Yemeni rial, and Yemen's economy contracted by 50% from the start of the civil war on 19 March 2015 to October 2018.

== Macro-economic trend ==
Historical GDP per capita development

This is a chart of trend of gross domestic product of Yemen (since unification) at market prices estimated by the International Monetary Fund with figures in millions of Yemeni Rials.

Year	Gross domestic product	US dollar exchange	Inflation index (2000=100)
1989	125,562	11.70 Yemeni Rials	5.10
1995	516,643	40.49 Yemeni Rials	51
2000	1,539,386	161.00 Yemeni Rials	100
2005	2,907,636	191.37 Yemeni Rials	175

For purchasing power parity comparisons, the US Dollar exchanged at 150.11 Yemeni Rials and mean wages were $1.06 per man-hour in 2009.

Remittances from Yemenis working abroad and foreign aid paid for perennial trade deficits. Substantial Yemeni communities exist in the Arabian Peninsula, Indonesia, India, East Africa, the United Kingdom, and the United States. Beginning in the mid-1950s, the Soviet Union and People's Republic of China provided large-scale assistance to the YAR. This aid included funding of substantial construction projects, scholarships, and considerable military assistance.

The following table shows the main economic indicators in 1994–2023 (with IMF staff estimates in 2025–2029).

Year	GDP (in bn. US$PPP)	GDP per capita (in US$ PPP)	GDP (in bn. US$ nominal)	GDP growth (real)	Inflation rate (in Percent)	Government debt (in % of GDP)
1990	24.20	1,845	12.64	n/a	n/a	n/a
1991	26.59	1,951	14.67	6.3	44.9	n/a
1992	29.43	2,078	17.96	8.2	51.2	n/a
1993	31.33	2,131	21.74	4.0	61.7	n/a
1994	34.15	2,237	28.02	6.7	71.3	n/a
1995	36.85	2,327	12.80	5.7	63.9	n/a
1996	39.26	2,398	6.50	4.6	38.8	n/a
1997	42.03	2,493	6.84	5.2	4.6	n/a
1998	45.05	2,595	6.32	6.0	11.5	n/a
1999	47.42	2,655	7.64	3.8	7.9	96
2000	51.49	2,803	9.68	6.2	11.0	61
2001	54.65	2,894	9.85	3.8	11.9	61
2002	57.68	2,973	10.69	3.9	12.2	58
2003	61.02	3,063	11.78	3.7	10.8	57
2004	65.15	3,185	13.87	4.0	12.5	52
2005	70.96	3,377	16.73	5.6	9.9	44
2006	75.46	3,489	19.06	3.2	10.8	41
2007	80.09	3,591	21.65	3.3	7.9	40
2008	84.62	3,682	26.91	3.6	19.0	36
2009	88.43	3,735	25.13	3.9	3.7	50
2010	96.40	3,953	30.91	7.7	11.2	42
2011	85.88	3,421	32.73	−12.7	19.5	46
2012	85.44	3,306	35.40	2.4	9.9	48
2013	92.76	3,487	40.42	4.8	11.0	48
2014	94.19	3,442	43.23	−0.2	8.2	49
2015	68.45	2,433	42.44	−28.0	22.0	58
2016	62.63	2,167	31.32	−9.4	21.3	77
2017	60.51	2,041	26.84	−5.1	30.4	84
2018	62.37	2,051	21.61	0.8	33.6	87
2019	64.73	2,077	21.89	2.1	15.7	91
2020	60.01	1,880	20.22	−8.5	21.7	87
2021	62.12	1,903	19.39	−1.0	31.5	76
2022	67.55	2,027	23.53	1.5	29.5	66
2023	68.58	2,013	18.81	−2.0	0.9	81
2024	69.52	1,996	16.19	−1.0	16.3	85
2025e	71.84	2,017	16.22	1.5	20.7	78
2026e	78.30	2,152	18.19	7.0	13.7	70
2027e	84.92	2,284	21.05	6.5	11.2	58
2028e	91.67	2,415	22.94	6.0	10.0	53
2029e	98.48	2,542	24.52	5.5	10.0	50

== Integration issues ==
In the south, pre-independence economic activity was overwhelmingly concentrated in the port city of Aden. The seaborne transit trade, upon which the port relied, collapsed with the closure of the Suez Canal and Britain's withdrawal from Aden in 1967. Only extensive Soviet aid, remittances from south Yemenis working abroad, and revenues from the Aden refinery (built in the 1950s) kept the PDRY's centrally planned Marxist economy afloat. With the dissolution of the Soviet Union and a cessation of Soviet aid, the south's economy effectively collapsed.

Since unification, the government has worked to integrate two relatively disparate economic systems. However, severe shocks — including the return of approximately 850,000 Yemenis in 1990 from the Persian Gulf states, a subsequent major reduction of aid flows, and internal political disputes culminating in the 1994 civil war — hampered economic growth.

== Industries ==
=== Agriculture and fishing ===
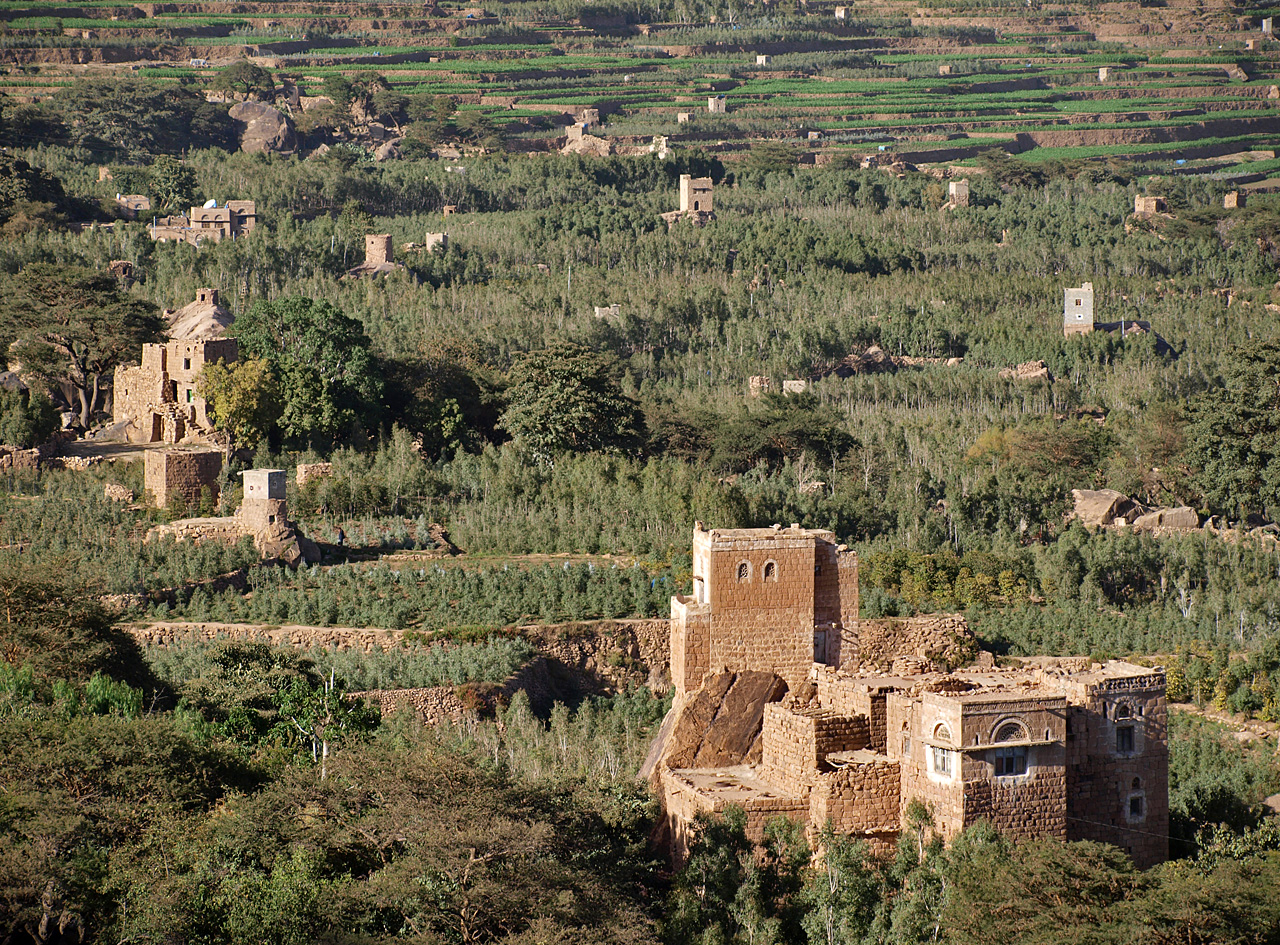
Khat cultivation in western Yemen near At Tawilah

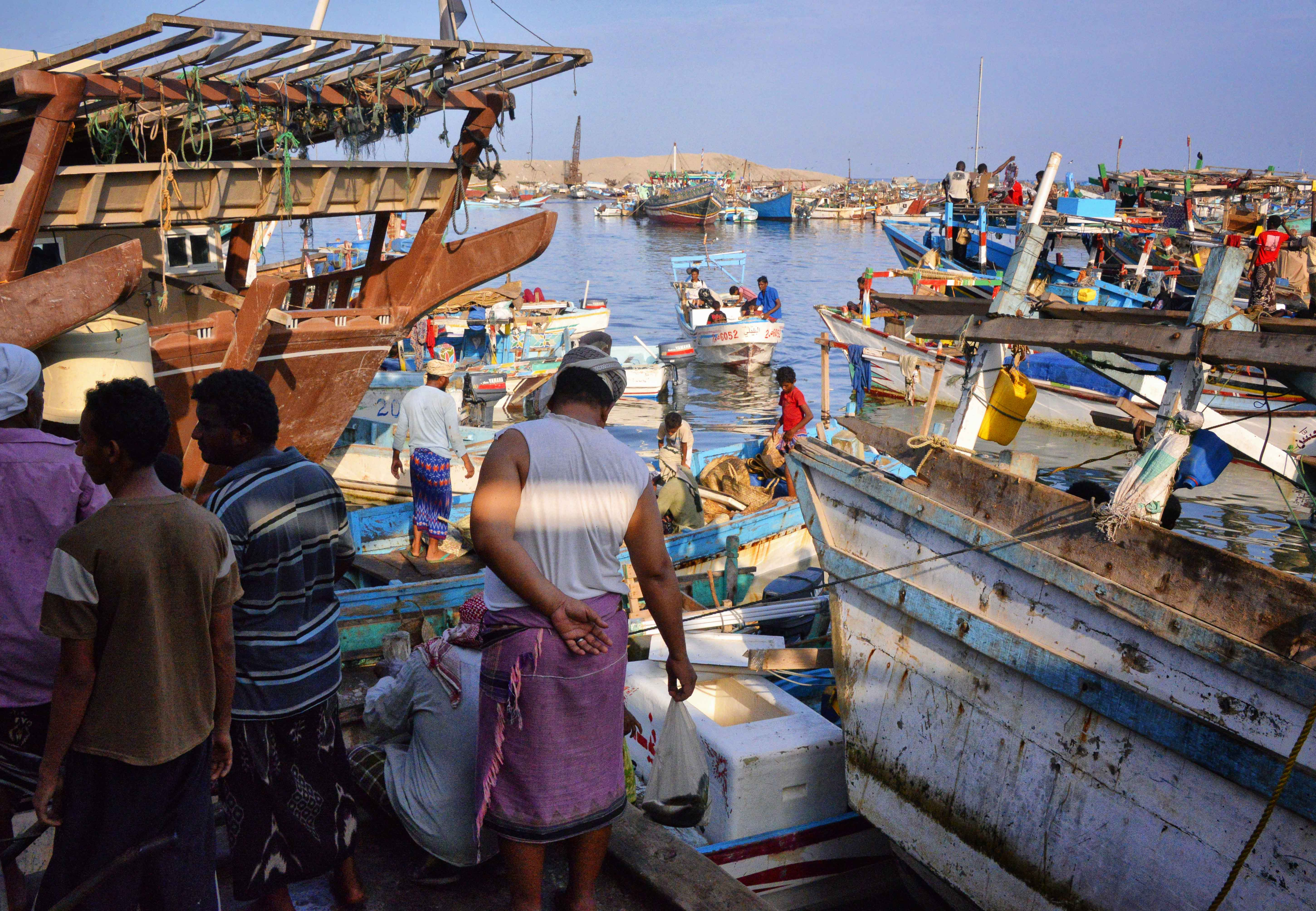
Fish market in Yemen (2013)

Agriculture is the mainstay of Yemen's economy, which has generated more than 20 percent of the country's gross domestic product (GDP) since 1990 (20.4 percent in 2005 according to the Central Bank of Yemen). Agriculture employs more than half (54.2 percent in 2003) of the working Yemeni population. However, a U.S. government estimate suggests that the sector accounted for only 13.5 percent of GDP in 2005. Numerous environmental problems hamper growth in this sector — soil erosion, sand dune encroachment, and deforestation — but the biggest problem by far is the scarcity of water. As a result of low levels of rainfall, agriculture in Yemen relies heavily on the extraction of groundwater, a resource that is being depleted. Yemen's water tables are falling by approximately two meters per year; it is estimated that Sanaa's groundwater supplies could be exhausted by 2030. The use of irrigation has made fruit and vegetables Yemen's primary cash crops. With the rise in the output of irrigated crops, the production of traditional rain-fed crops such as cereals has declined. According to the Central Bank of Yemen, the production of khat, a mildly narcotic and heavily cultivated plant that produces natural stimulants when its leaves are chewed, rose 6.7 percent in 2005 and accounted for 5.8 percent of GDP; the consumption of khat is widespread in Yemen. According to the World Bank and other economists, cultivation of this plant plays a dominant role in Yemen's agricultural economy, constituting 10 percent of GDP and employing an estimated 150,000 persons while consuming an estimated 30 percent of irrigation water and displacing land areas that could otherwise be used for exportable coffee, fruits, and vegetables.

Although Yemen's extensive territorial waters and marine resources have the potential to produce 840,000 tons of fish each year, its fishing industry is relatively underdeveloped and consists largely of individual fishermen in small boats. After the government lifted restrictions on fish exports, production reached one-quarter of capacity, yielding revenues valued at US$260 million in 2005. Fish and fish products constituted only 1.7 percent of Yemen's GDP but were the second largest export. In December 2005, the World Bank approved a US$25 million credit for a Fisheries Management and Conservation Project in all coastal governorates along the Red Sea and the Gulf of Aden. This project was expected to improve fish landing and auction facilities; provide ice plants for fish preservation; and enable Yemen's Ministry of Fisheries to undertake more effective research, resource management planning, and regulatory activities.

=== Oil and gas ===
Yemen is an oil producer and has significant untapped offshore oil and gas deposits. Unlike many regional oil producers, Yemen relies heavily on foreign oil companies that have production-sharing agreements with the government. Income from oil production constitutes 70 to 75 percent of government revenue and about 90 percent of exports. Yemen contains proven crude oil reserves of more than 9 billion barrels (1.4×10^{9} m^{3}), although that is falling from the country's older fields, which have been wrecked by war and corruption, both driven by the fact that oil provides around 90% of the country's exports. The World Bank predicted that Yemen's oil and gas revenues would plummet during 2009 and 2010, and would fall to zero by 2017 as supplies ran out; and then the UK's Royal Institute for International Affairs warned that instability in Yemen could expand a zone of lawlessness from northern Kenya to Saudi Arabia, while describing Yemen's democracy as "fragile" and pointing to armed conflicts with Islamists and tribal insurgents as causes of instability. As a result, Western entities and other diplomats and leaders have an interest in maintaining Yemen's stability averting adverse outcomes. According to statistics published by the Energy Information Administration, crude oil output averaged 413,300 barrels per day (65,710 m^{3}/d) in 2005, which was a reduction from 423,700 bbl/d (67,360 m^{3}/d) in 2004. For the first eight months of 2006, crude oil output was flat, averaging 412,500 bbl/d (65,580 m^{3}/d).

Following a minor discovery in 1982 in the south, an American company found an oil basin near Ma'rib in 1984. A total of 27,000 cubic metres per day (170,000 barrels per day) was produced there in 1995. A small oil refinery began operations near Ma'rib in 1986. A Soviet discovery in the southern governorate of Shabwah has proven only marginally successful even when taken over by a different group. A Western consortium began exporting oil from Masila in the Hadhramaut in 1993, and production there reached 67,000 m^{3}/d (420,000 bbl/d) in 1999. There are new finds in the Jannah (formerly known as the Joint Oil Exploration Area) and east Shabwah blocks. Yemen's oil exports in 1995 earned about US$1 billion. Yemen's offshore oil and gas deposits are estimated to contain billions of barrels of oil and gas. Marib oil contains associated natural gas. In September 1995, the Yemeni Government signed an agreement that designated TotalEnergies of France to be the lead company for a project for the export of liquefied natural gas (LNG). In 1997, Yemen Gas Company joined with various privately held companies to establish Yemen LNG (YLNG). In August 2005, the government gave final approval to three LNG supply agreements, enabling YLNG to award a $2 billion contract to an international consortium to build the country's first liquefaction plant at Balhat on the Arabian Sea coast. The project is a $3.7 billion investment over 25 years, producing approximately 6.7 million tons of LNG annually, with shipments likely to go to the United States and South Korea. Production of LNG began in October 2009. The Yemen government expects the LNG project to add $350 million to its budget and enable it to develop a petrochemicals industry.

=== Industry and manufacturing ===
The US government estimates that Yemen's industrial sector constitutes 47.2 percent of gross domestic product (GDP). Together with services, construction, and commerce, industry accounts for less than 25 percent of the labor force. The largest contributor to the manufacturing sector's output is oil refining, which generates roughly 40 percent of total revenue. The remainder of this sector consists of the production of consumer goods and construction materials. Manufacturing constituted approximately 9.5 percent of Yemen's GDP in 2005. In 2000 Yemen had almost 34,000 industrial establishments with a total of nearly 115,000 workers; the majority of the establishments were small businesses (one to four employees). Almost half of all industrial establishments are involved in processing food products and beverages; the production of flour and cooking oil has increased in recent years. Approximately 10 percent of the establishments are classified as manufacturing mixed metal products, such as water-storage tanks, doors, and windows.

=== Services and tourism ===
Economists have reported that Yemen's services sector constituted 51.7 percent of gross domestic product (GDP) in 2002 and 52.2 percent of GDP in 2003. The US government estimated that the services sector accounted for 39.7 percent of GDP in 2004 and 39.3 percent in 2005.

Yemen's tourism industry is hampered by both limited infrastructure and significant security concerns. The country's hotels and restaurants are below international standards, and air and road transportation is largely inadequate. Kidnappings of foreign tourists remain a threat, especially outside the main cities. Coupled with terrorist bombings at the Port of Aden in 2000 and 2002, the threat of kidnappings presents a significant deterrent to tourism. In September 2006, tribesmen in the Shabwa province, east of Sanaa, kidnapped four French tourists on their way to Aden; the tourists were freed two weeks later. In October 2006, the U.S. Department of State reiterated warnings to U.S. citizens, strongly urging them to carefully consider the risks of traveling to Yemen. Britain's Foreign Office issued a similar advisory. However, the number of tourist arrivals rose to 274,000 in 2004 from 155,000 in 2003.

=== Banking and finance ===
According to economists, Yemen's financial services sector is underdeveloped and dominated by the banking system. Yemen has no public stock exchange. The banking system consists of the Central Bank of Yemen, 15 commercial banks (nine private domestic banks, four of which are Islamic banks; four private foreign banks; and two state-owned banks), and two specialized state-owned development banks. The Central Bank of Yemen controls monetary policy and oversees the transfer of currencies abroad. It is the lender of last resort, exercises supervisory authority over commercial banks, and serves as a banker to the government. Since the end of 2005 and up to the end of 2010, Tadhamon International Islamic Bank has maintained the top spot of all banks in Yemen (both Commercial and Islamic) in terms of total assets, capital, and trade business. The largest commercial bank, the state-owned Credit and Agricultural Cooperative Bank, and the majority state-owned Yemen Bank for Reconstruction and Development are each currently being restructured with the goal of eventual privatization. Because of fiscal difficulties in both banks, Yemen government adopted a plan to merge all three banks in 2004; the new publicly owned Development Bank will have a minimum capital of US$50 million. As of April 2011, this step has not yet materialized.

The large volume of non-performing loans, low capitalization, and weak enforcement of regulatory standards hamper Yemen's banking sector as a whole. Numerous banks are technically insolvent. Because many debtors are in default, Yemen's banks limit their lending activities to a select group of consumers and businesses. As a result, the entire banking system holds less than 60 percent of the money supply; the bulk of the economy operates with cash. Legislation adopted in 2000 gave the Central Bank the authority to enforce tougher lending requirements, and in mid-2005 the Central Bank promulgated several new capital requirements for commercial banks, together aimed at curtailing currency speculation and protecting deposits.

In March 2023, the Houthi-controlled parliament in Sanaa passed a law banning the charging of interest. MP Ahmed Saif said the law would have catastrophic consequences for banks and citizens, the Minister of Finance and the governor of the Sanaa-based Central Bank of Yemen refused to endorse the law publicly, and a Sanaa banking official said that religious hardliners in the Houthi movement had pushed for the legislation.

=== Electricity ===
Electricity generation in Yemen in terawatt-hours

Yemen's state-owned Public Electricity Corporation (PEC) operates an estimated 80 percent of the country's electricity generating capacity (810–900 megawatts) as well as the national power grid. Over the past 10 years, the government has considered various means of alleviating the country's significant electricity shortage, including restructuring the PEC, integrating the power sector through small-scale privatization of power stations, creating independent power projects (IPPs), and introducing gas-generated power plants to free up oil supplies for export. However, because of inadequate infrastructure, large-scale IPPs and privatization proposals have failed to materialize; several smaller-scale projects in Mukalla and Aden, however, have been completed, and contracts have been signed for future projects. In 2004, Yemen's diesel-run power plants generated 4.1 billion kilowatt-hours of electricity, a level of production that is insufficient to maintain a consistent supply of electricity. Although demand for electricity increased 20 percent between 2000 and 2004, it is estimated that only 40 percent of the total population has access to electricity from the national power grid, and supply is intermittent. To meet this demand, the government plans to increase the country's power generating capacity to 1,400 megawatts by 2002.

== Labor ==
According to the US government, the agriculture and herding sector employs the majority of Yemen's working population (54.2 percent in 2003). Industry, services, construction, and commerce collectively account for less than 25 percent of the labor force.

According to the World Bank, Yemen's civil service is characterized by a large, poorly paid work force and inadequate salary differential between high and low skilled jobs to attract and retain qualified workers. In 2004, the government increased civil service salaries by 20 to 40 percent in order to alleviate the impact of anticipated economic reforms that were never implemented. The result was a 20 percent rise in wage costs; civil service wages constituted 7 percent of gross domestic product (GDP) in 2004. The 2005 budget reduced economic subsidies, but in exchange the new budget required the government to make various concessions, including increasing civil service wages another 10 to 15 percent by 2007 as part of a national wage strategy.

The economic assistance package that the International Monetary Fund (IMF) pledged to Yemen is contingent on the implementation of civil service reform, which the government has resisted because of the country's estimated 20 to 40 percent unemployment rate. In 2004, the government claimed to have reduced the civil service labor force through retirements and layoffs, but it appears that the large salary increases have lessened the impact of any reforms. The IMF has stated that civil service salaries as a component of GDP should be reduced by 1 to 2 percent, a level that can only be achieved with continued reductions in the size of the civil service. It is unclear whether the national wage strategy, which may succeed in streamlining the system and removing irregularities, will in fact be able to reduce employment costs.

== Currency, exchange rate, and inflation ==
Yemen's currency is the Yemeni rial (YR), which was floated on the open market in July 1996. Periodic intervention by the Central Bank of Yemen has enabled the riyal to gradually depreciate approximately 4 percent per year since 1999. Its valued averaged YR191.5 per U.S. dollar in 2005, and has averaged YR197.5 in 2006. In late November 2006, the exchange rate was about YR198 per dollar. In March 2023 the exchange rate for new rials in government-controlled areas was YR1,252 on average.

During the years immediately following unification (1990–96), Yemen experienced a very high average rate of inflation, at 40%. Economic reforms brought the inflation rate down to only 5.4 percent in 1997, but high oil prices and cuts in the fuel subsidy in recent years have had a negative impact on the inflation rate, which has generally been on the rise despite some fluctuations. In 2004, efforts by the Central Bank of Yemen to tighten the money supply were offset by a weakening U.S. dollar - to which the Yemeni riyal is linked in a managed float - and by rising global commodity prices, resulting in an inflation rate of 12.5%. In 2018 the inflation rate was 33.65%.

In July 2005, the government succumbed to public opposition and lowered the new general sales tax from 10 to 5 percent. There are special rates for telecommunication mobile services (10%) and cigarettes (90%).

== Government budget ==
In 1995, in order to comply with conditions stipulated by the International Monetary Fund (IMF), Yemen began an economic reform program, one component of which is fiscal policy reform aimed at reducing deficits and expanding the revenue base. However, the government has failed to significantly reduce its primary expenditure—subsidies, especially the fuel subsidy. In January 2005, Yemen's parliament narrowly adopted a 2005 budget that forecast a reduced budget deficit of about 3 percent of gross domestic product (GDP). The budget was predicated on the adoption of a reform package that included a broad-based, 10 percent general sales tax (GST) and a 75 percent reduction in the fuel subsidy. Strong public opposition to these reforms led the government in July 2005 to defer the 10 percent GST for 18 months, adopting instead a hybrid 5 percent GST, and to modify the fuel subsidy reduction. Nonetheless, the cost of subsidies, primarily for fuel, rose dramatically (almost 90 percent) in 2005, accounting for the largest share (almost 25 percent) of total government expenditures and approximately 9 percent of GDP. These costs, coupled with a 24 percent increase in civil service wages and salaries and a 42 percent increase in defense spending, resulted in a government budget deficit of US$350.8 million, or more than 2 percent of GDP, in 2005. The government has budgeted a sharp (41 percent) rise in overall spending for 2006, which economists estimate will result in a fiscal deficit of US$800 million, or 4.2 percent of GDP.

== Foreign economic relations ==
=== History and overview ===
During the 1990–91 Persian Gulf War, Yemen supported Iraq in its invasion of Kuwait, thereby alienating Saudi Arabia and Kuwait, which both had provided critical financial assistance to Yemen. In addition to withdrawing this aid, Saudi Arabia expelled almost 1 million Yemeni workers. The resultant fall in expatriate remittances had a disastrous impact on Yemen's governmental budget. The civil war of 1994 further drained the economy, and in 1995 Yemen sought the aid of multilateral agencies. In 1996 the International Monetary Fund (IMF) granted Yemen a US$190 million stand-by credit facility, and the following year it approved two funding facilities that increased the country's credit by approximately US$500 million. The funding was contingent on Yemen's adoption of stringent economic reforms, a requirement that the country had limited success in fulfilling. As a result, the IMF suspended lending to Yemen from late 1999 until February 2001. The extension of the two funding facilities, particularly the poverty reduction and growth facility (PRGF), through October 2001 was again contingent on Yemen's commitment to economic reform. Because of Yemen's failure to comply sufficiently with the terms imposed by the IMF, since 2002 the IMF has withheld US$300 million in concessional financing. Discussions over the renewal of the PRGF are ongoing. In 2000 Kuwait and Saudi Arabia resumed financial aid to Yemen.

In October 2002, bilateral and multilateral lenders led by the World Bank agreed to give Yemen a four-year economic support package worth US$2.3 billion, 20 percent in grants and 80 percent in concessional loans. This funding is almost eight times the amount of financial support Yemen received under the IMF's PRGF. However, in December 2005 the World Bank announced that because of the government's continued inability to effect significant economic reforms and stem corruption, funding would be reduced by more than one-third, from US$420 million to US$240 million for the period July 2005 – July 2008. In May 2006, the World Bank adopted a new Country Assistance Strategy (CAS) for Yemen for the period FY 2006 to FY 2009, providing a blueprint for fostering the country's fiscal and human development improvement. The bank pledged to contribute approximately US$400 million in International Development Association (IDA) credits over the CAS time frame. At present, Yemen owes approximately US$264 million to Japan, one of its largest donors. In December 2005, the Japanese government pledged to write off US$17 million of the debt. That same month, Germany pledged to increase its annual aid to Yemen to US$83.6 million over the next two years; funding will go primarily to education and water improvement projects. In November 2006, the United Kingdom announced that aid to Yemen would increase 400 percent, to US$222 million through 2011.

Yemen is a member of the Arab Fund for Economic and Social Development, which since 1974 has contributed to the financing of economic and social development in Arab states and countries through loans and guarantees. In March 2004, the Arab League provided US$136 million to Yemen to finance infrastructure improvements. At a mid-November 2006 meeting in London, a group of bilateral and multilateral donors pledged US$4.7 billion over four years (2007–10) to fund economic development in Yemen. The goal of the meeting, which was jointly chaired by the World Bank and the government of Yemen, was to provide sufficient economic aid to Yemen to enable it to qualify for future Gulf Cooperation Council (GCC) membership. More than 55 percent of the aid, which is primarily in the form of grants, will come from the GCC. Yemen was granted observer status at the World Trade Organization (WTO) in 1999, and its application for full membership was under negotiation as of December 2006.

=== Foreign trade ===
Exports of Yemen by product category (2019) Chemical products Transportation Machines Mineral products Plastics and rubbers Metals Foodstuffs Precious metals Textiles Instruments Animal products Vegetable products Paper goods Footwear and headwear Miscellaneous Stone and glass Wood products Animal and vegetable bi-products Animal hides Arts and antiques Weapons

Imports totaled an estimated US$4.7 billion in 2005 and are projected to increase to US$5 billion in 2006 and to US$5.4 billion in 2007. Yemen is a net importer of all major categories of products except fuels. Principal imports are machinery and transport equipment, food and livestock, and processed materials. According to the United Nations, Yemen imports more than 75 percent of its main dietary staple—wheat. The principal source of Yemen's imports in 2005 was the United Arab Emirates (13.4 percent of total imports); the bulk of these imports are actually re-exports from the United States and Kuwait. Yemen received 10.6 percent of its total imports from Saudi Arabia and 9 percent from China.

In 2005 Yemen's exports totaled US$6.4 billion. Exports are expected to increase to reach a record US$8.6 billion in 2006 as a result of strong oil revenues. Petroleum is Yemen's main export, accounting for 92 percent of total exports in 2004 and 87 percent in 2005. Yemen's non-oil exports are primarily agricultural products, mainly fish and fish products, vegetables, and fruits. In 2005 Asia was the most important market for Yemen's exports, primarily China (37.3 percent of total exports), Thailand, and Japan. Chile was also a primary export market (19.6 percent of total exports).

Yemen's import and export values have increased and decreased dramatically in the past 10 years owing to shifts in global oil prices. As a result, the country's trade balance has fluctuated significantly from a deficit of almost US$800 million in 1998 to a surplus of US$1 billion in 2000. Rising oil prices resulted in a surplus of US$817 million in 2004 and a surplus of US$1.7 billion in 2005.

In recent years, Yemen has reported increasing non-merchandise deficits. These deficits have, however, been offset by record export earnings, which have resulted in large enough trade surpluses to keep the current account in surplus—US$175.7 million in 2003, US$524.6 million in 2004, and US$633.1 million (about 4 percent of gross domestic product) in 2005.

==== Trade Regulations ====
In September 2024, the Yemen Gulf of Aden Ports Corporation (YGAPC), that's under Yemen’s internationally recognized government, announced the introduction of an Advance Cargo Declaration (ACD) requirement for containerized cargo destined for its ports, including the Port of Aden. The regulation requires shippers or freight forwarders to obtain an ACD number at the port of loading and to include it on the bill of lading. The requirement was subsequently reported as becoming mandatory for shipments to Yemen from 1 February 2025.

As of 2025, no equivalent publicly documented ACD regulation has been confirmed for ports outside the control of the internationally recognised government, such as Port of Hodeidah, which is administered by Houthi-aligned authorities, or Port of Mocha, where control and administrative practices differ. Requirements at these ports may vary and are typically confirmed through local agents or shipping lines.

=== External debt ===
In 1990 the newly unified Republic of Yemen inherited an unsustainable debt burden amounting to roughly 106 percent of gross domestic product. Debt rescheduling by the Paris Club creditor countries in the 1990s coupled with assistance from the World Bank's International Development Agency resulted in a drop in Yemen's debt stock to US$5.4 billion (an estimated 39 percent of gross domestic product) by year-end 2004. According to the Central Bank of Yemen, Yemen's debt stock was US$5.2 billion (an estimated 33 percent of gross domestic product) by year-end 2005. According to the U.S. government, Yemen's reserves of foreign exchange and gold were US$6.1 billion in 2005.

=== Foreign investment ===
Yemen does not have a stock exchange, therefore limiting inward portfolio investment. Portfolio investment abroad is also very limited, with the result that portfolio flows are largely unrecorded by authorities. In the early 1990s, net direct investment was at its peak as foreign investors tapped Yemeni oil reserves, but since 1995 net direct investment flows have been negative because cost recovery for foreign oil companies has exceeded new direct investment. A five-year US$3 billion liquid natural gas (LNG) construction project involving a consortium of foreign companies is planned following government approval in August 2005. Such a project raises the prospect of increased foreign investment in the future as LNG facilities are built.

=== International aid ===
Beginning in the mid-1950s, the Soviet Union and China provided large-scale assistance. For example, China was involved with the expansion of the Sanaa International Airport. In the south, pre-independence economic activity was overwhelmingly concentrated in the port city of Aden. The seaborne transit trade, which the port relied upon, collapsed with the temporary closure of the Suez Canal and Britain's withdrawal from Aden in 1967.

In early 1995, the government of Yemen launched an economic, financial, and administrative reform program (EFARP) with the support of the World Bank and the IMF, as well as international donors. These programs had a positive impact on Yemen's economy and led to the reduction of the budget deficit to less than 3% of gross domestic product during the period 1995–1999 and the correction of macro-financial imbalances. The real growth rate in the non-oil sector rose by 5.6% from 1995 to 1997.

Yemen is missing some international support because, as of 2024, it is one of three countries which have not ratified the Paris Agreement to limit climate change.
