= Yemeni rial =

Currency of Yemen

ريال يمني (Arabic)
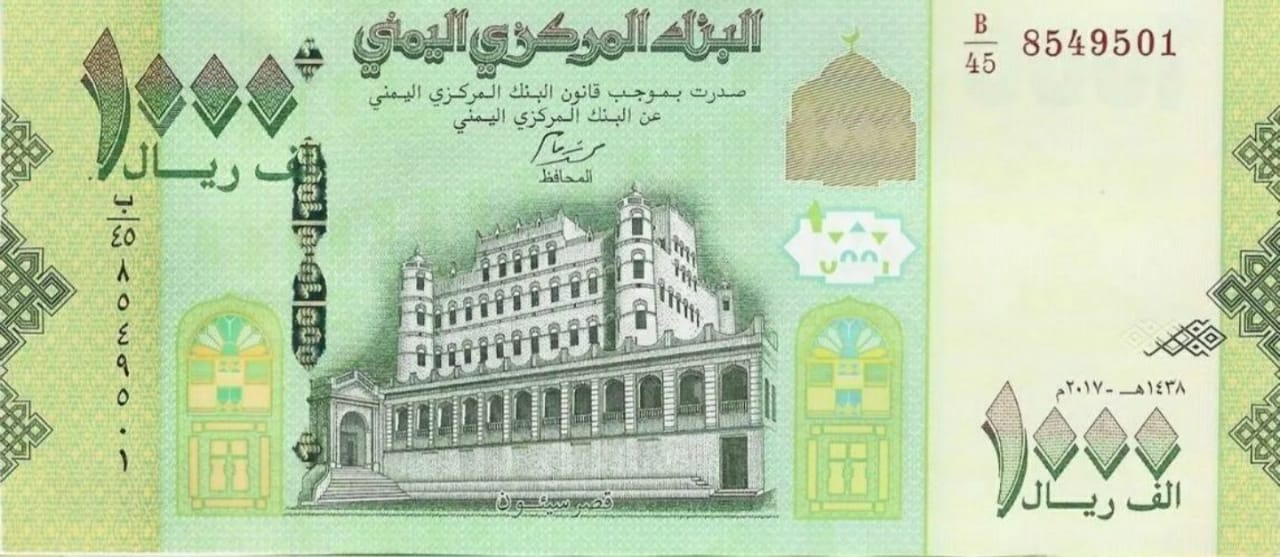
- 1000 Yemeni rial banknote

ISO 4217
- Code: YER (numeric: 886)
- Subunit: 0.01

Units of account
- Symbol: ﷼ or YRl/YRls
- Superunit
- 10: dinar
- Subunit
- 1/100: fils

Denominations
- Banknotes: YRls 50, YRls 100, YRls 200, YRls 250, YRls 500, YRls 1,000
- Coins: YRl 1, YRls 5, YRls 10, YRls 20

Demographics
- Replaced: North Yemeni rial Yemeni dinar
- User(s): Yemen

Issuance
- Central bank: Central Bank of Yemen
- Website: www.centralbank.gov.ye

Valuation
- Inflation: 16.8%
- Source: 2023

The rial (Arabic: ريال يمني; sign: ﷼; abbreviation: YRl (singular) and YRls (plural) in Latin, ,ر.ي in Arabic; ISO code: YER) is the official currency of the Republic of Yemen. It is technically divided into 100 fils, although coins denominated in fils have not been issued since Yemeni unification. Due to the ongoing political instability, the value of the Yemeni rial has fallen significantly.

The Yemeni civil war has caused the currency to diverge. In southern Yemen, which is primarily controlled by UAE-backed separatists and the internationally recognized government backed by Saudi Arabia, ongoing printing has caused the currency's value to plummet. However, in northern Yemen, which is primarily controlled by the Houthis with support from Iran, banknotes printed after 2017 are not considered legal tender. Therefore, the exchange rate has remained stable. The differences in banknotes printed before and after 2017 can be determined by their size.

== History ==
In the 18th and 19th centuries, the rial was traditionally associated with the Maria Theresa thaler, a currency that was widely used in Yemen owing to the Mocha coffee trade with the French, and a Yemeni request that its produce be paid for in thalers.

As Yemen progressed, it developed its own legal currency. After the union between the North (the Yemen Arab Republic) and the South (the People's Democratic Republic of Yemen) in 1990, both the northern rial and the southern dinar remained legal tender during a transitional period, with an exchange rate set at 1 dinar to 26 rials. On 11 June 1996, the dinar was withdrawn from circulation. In 1993, the first coins were issued for the Republic of Yemen. The value of the Yemeni rial against the United States dollar dropped significantly, compared to 12.01 rials per dollar in the early 1990s.

Since the mid-1990s, the Yemeni rial has been freely convertible. Though it dropped from YRls 20 to approximately YRls 215 against the US dollar since then, the rial was stable for several years. However, since 2010 the Central Bank of Yemen has had to intervene many times to protect the currency's value, resulting in a serious decline of foreign reserves. Due to the war, the exchange rate for the Yemeni rial has hovered between 250 and 500 Yemeni rials for 1 US dollar.

In January 2025, the currency further deteriorated to a historic low point, where 1 USD was traded at 2150 Yemeni rials due to the lack of foreign currency availability in exchange markets and the failure of government authorities to intervene with solutions for this issue. This decline was observed in areas under the control of the internationally-supported Presidential Leadership Council, while the Yemeni rial exchange rate remained stable in areas controlled by the Houthis, where the dollar was approximately 530 rials.

== Coins ==
Before unification, North Yemen issued coins in denominations of 1, 5, 10, 25 and 50 fils, and 1 rial. The fils denominations have all disappeared from circulation. In 1993, new coins were introduced by the Central Bank of Yemen in denominations of 1 and 5 rials. These were followed by 10-rial coins in 1995 and 20-rial coins in 2004.

For the first time in nearly a decade, Yemen's Houthi-led de facto government has announced the issuing of a newly minted 100 riyal coin, a move which has prompted outcry from the internationally recognised government and its central bank based in Aden as a “dangerous escalation.”

YRl 1	YRls 5	YRls 10	YRls 20

== Banknotes ==
At the time of unification, the Central Bank of Yemen issued banknotes in denominations of 1, 5, 10, 20, 50, and 100 rials. In 1993, the 1 and 5 rial notes were replaced by coins, with the same happening to the 10 rial notes in 1995, and 20 rial notes in 2004. In 1996, 200 rial notes were introduced, followed by 500 rials in 1997 and 1,000 rials in 1998. A 250 rial banknote was issued in 2009.

In 2017, the Central Bank of Yemen, now relocated in Aden, its interim capital due to the civil war, issued 500 and 1,000 rial banknotes with revised security features and different dimensions. In 2018, the Central Bank of Yemen reintroduced the 200 rial banknote and has issued a new 100 rial banknote.

In 2025 the Houthi administration in Sanaa issued a 200 rial banknote, inscribed Central Bank of Yemen, i.e. the same as regular banknotes issued by the internationally recognized government, which warned all citizens, financial institutions, banks, and money exchange companies against dealing with "counterfeit currencies" from an "illegal terrorist entity" and of punishment for anyone found possessing or using them.

=== 1990-2009 series ===
Currently circulating banknotes (1994–2009)
Image		Value	Main Colour	Description		Date of	
Obverse	Reverse	Value	Main Colour	Obverse	Reverse	Printing	Issue
		YRls 1	Green	Al-Bakiriyya Mosque	Coffea arabica	1990	
		YRls 5	Light red	Buildings in Old Sana'a	Al-Qahira Castle in Taiz		
		YRls 10	Blue and black	Al-Bakiriyya Mosque	Marib Dam	1992	
		YRls 20	Dark brown	Sculpture of Dionysus with grapes	A dhow in Aden Harbor	1995	
		YRls 50	Olive-green	Bronze statue of Ma'adkarib, ancient king of Haram	Shibam city, Hadramaut	1993	
		YRls 100	Purple	Cisterns of Tawila, Aden	City view of Sana'a with mosque minaret and mountains	1993	
		YRls 200	Green	Alabaster sculpture	Mukalla	1996	
		YRls 250	Orange & blue	Al-Saleh mosque, Sana'a	Khor Al-Mukalla	2009	November 14, 2009
		YRIs 500	Purple	Central Bank building, Sana'a	Throne of Queen Bilqis in Ma'rib	1997	
		YRls 500	Blue	Dar al-Hajr (Palace of the Rock)	Al-Muhdhar Mosque, Tarim	2001	
		YRls 500	Cyan	Dar al-Hajr (Palace of the Rock)	Al-Muhdhar Mosque, Tarim	2007	
		YRls 1,000	Green & yellow	Seiyun Palace, Hadhramaut	Bab al-Yaman, San'a	1998, 2004, 2009	August 2010

=== 2017–2018 series ===
Currently circulating banknotes (2017–2018 series)
Image		Value	Main Colour	Description		Date of	
Obverse	Reverse	Value	Main Colour	Obverse	Reverse	Printing	Issue
		YRls 100	Red and violet	Dragon Blood Tree of Socotra. Qamariya stained glass window art. Outline of a mosque as a latent image.	Terraced agricultural farming fields. Queen Arwa Mosque Mihrab decorated niche	2018	
		YRls 200	Yellow	Zabid fortress, Al Hudaydah Governorate	Hawf, Al Mahrah Governorate	2018	August 2018
		YRls 500	Light Cyan	Al-Muhdhar Mosque, Tarim	Dar al-Hajar	2017	
		YRls 1,000	Green	Seiyun Palace, Hadhramaut	Bab al-Yaman, San'a	2017	

=== Houthi-issued notes ===
The recognized central bank in Aden and other authorities consider the note illegal.

Houthi-issued note
Image		Value	Main Colour	Description		Date of	
Obverse	Reverse	Value	Main Colour	Obverse	Reverse	Printing	Issue
		YRls 200	Pink, light blue, yellow, and black	Al-Janad Mosque in Taiz	Oil tankers in Al Ma’alla port in Aden		July 16, 2025

Current YER exchange rates
From Google Finance:	AUD CAD CHF CNY EUR GBP HKD JPY USD
From Yahoo! Finance:	AUD CAD CHF CNY EUR GBP HKD JPY USD
From XE.com:	AUD CAD CHF CNY EUR GBP HKD JPY USD
From OANDA:	AUD CAD CHF CNY EUR GBP HKD JPY USD

Yemeni rial
Preceded by: South Yemeni dinar Location: South Yemen; Ratio: 1 dinar = 26 rials Note: Use of the Yemeni rial started in 1990, Yemeni dinar was withdrawn from circulation in 1996.	Currency of Yemen; 1990 –	Succeeded by: Current
Preceded by: North Yemeni rial Location: North Yemen; Ratio: at par	Currency of Yemen; 1990 –	Succeeded by: Current

== See also ==
- Economy of Yemen
- Ahmed A AL-Samawi
- Iranian rial
- Omani rial
- Qatari riyal
- Saudi riyal

== Sources ==
- Krause, Chester L.; Clifford Mishler (1991). Standard Catalog of World Coins: 1801–1991 (18th ed.). Krause Publications. ISBN 0873411501.
- Pick, Albert (1994). Bruce, Colin R. II; Shafer, Neil (eds.). Standard Catalog of World Paper Money: General Issues (7th ed.). Krause Publications. ISBN 0-87341-207-9.
