= Central Bank of Yemen =

Coordinates: 15°20′56″N 44°12′26″E

Central Bank of Yemen البنك المركزي اليمني
- Headquarters: Aden
- Established: 1971
- Ownership: 100% state ownership
- Governor: Ahmed Ghaleb al-Mabaqi
- Central bank of: Yemen
- Currency: Yemeni rial YER (ISO 4217)
- Reserves: $1.8 billion
- Website: cby-ye.com

The Central Bank of Yemen (Arabic: البنك المركزي اليمني) is the central bank of Yemen. The Bank is engaged in developing policies to promote financial inclusion and is a member of the Alliance for Financial Inclusion.

== History ==
A Yemen Currency Board was in activity from 1964 to 1967. The Central Bank of North Yemen was established in 1971 and the Central Bank of South Yemen in 1972. When the northern and southern sectors of Yemen reunited on 22 May 1990, the Central Bank of Yemen (of the north) merged with the Bank of Yemen (of the south) under the original name of “Central Bank of Yemen”.

Due to the Yemeni Civil War, the bank is bifurcated between the Central Bank of Yemen in Aden (CBY-Aden) and the Central Bank of Yemen in Sanaa (CBY-Sanaa).

== Governors of the Central Bank ==
- Abdul Aziz Abdul Ghani, 1971-1975
- Abdulla al-Sanabani, 1975-1985
- Mohammad Ahmed al-Junaid, 1985-1990
- Mohammad Ahmed al-Junaid, 1990-1994
- Alawi Saleh al-Salami, 1994-1997
- Ahmed Abdul Rahman Al-Samawi, 1997-2010
- Mohamed Awad Bin Humam, 2010-2016
- Mansar Al-Quaiti (in Aden), 2016-2018
- Mohamed Mansour Zemam (in Aden), 2018-2019
- Hafedh Meyad (in Aden), 2019
- Ahmed Obaid Al Fadhli (in Aden), 2019-2021
- Ahmed Bin Ahmed Ghaleb al-Mabaqi (in Aden), 2021- incumbent

== See also ==
- Ministry of Finance (Yemen)
- Economy of Yemen
- List of banks in Yemen
- Yemeni rial
- List of central banks
