= Royal Oman Symphony Orchestra =

Omani orchestra

- Orchestra
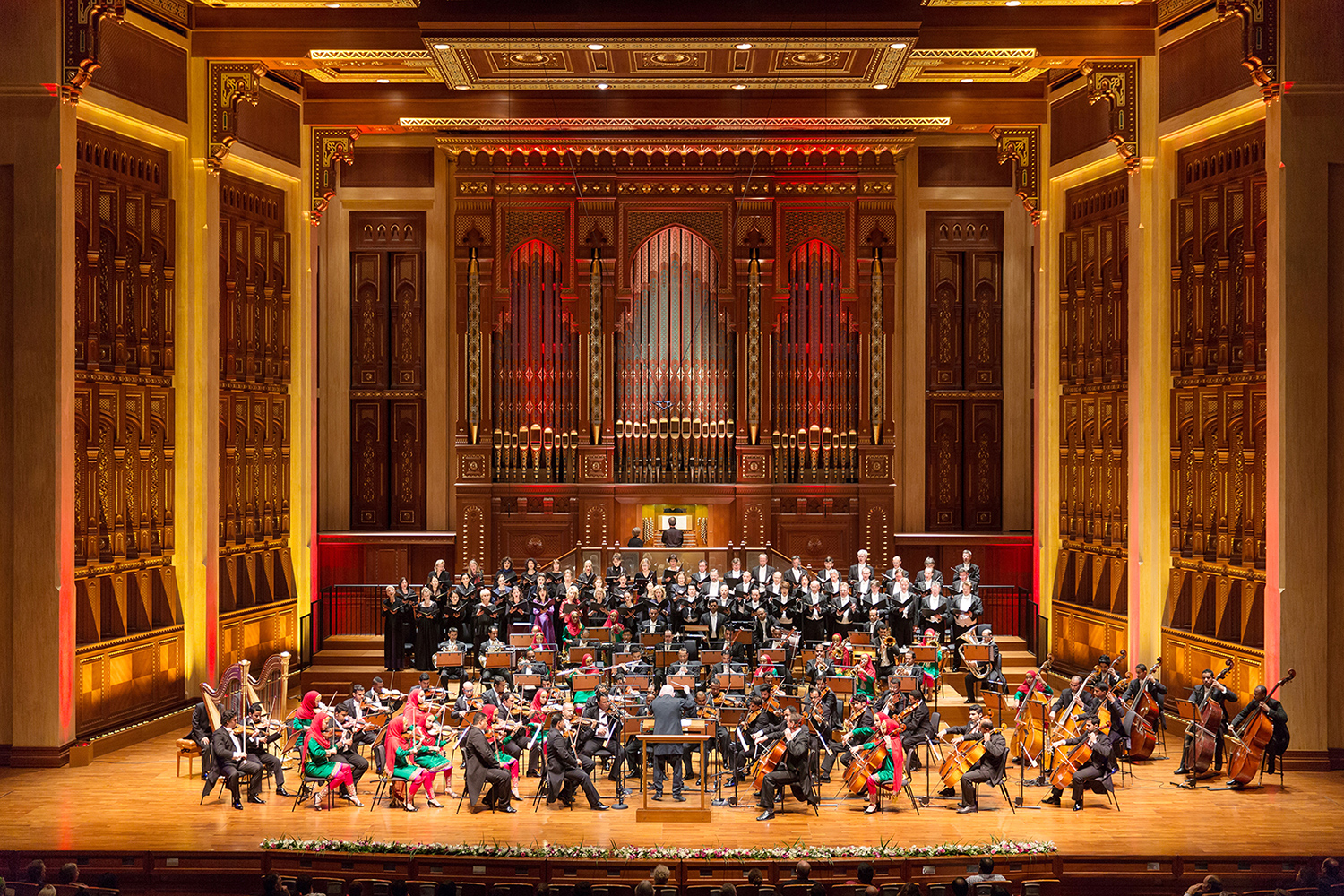
- ROSO at the Royal Opera House Muscat
- Native name: الأوركسترا السيمفونية السلطانية العمانية
- Founded: September 1985
- Location: Muscat, Oman

The Royal Oman Symphony Orchestra is an Omani orchestra based in Muscat. It was established in 1985 by Sultan Qaboos bin Said within the Royal Guard. Consisting solely of Omani nationals, foreign musicians were recruited for training. Initially all male, the first female musicians joined in 1988. Since its inaugural concert at the Al-Bustan Palace in 1987, it has performed both domestically and internationally, including in the United Arab Emirates, in Belgium for its first European performance in 2000, for UNESCO in Paris in 2003, at the Young Euro Classic in Berlin in 2007, and at the Berliner Philharmonie in 2024. Since 2010, it has been joined in Oman by a "sister orchestra", the Muscat Royal Philharmonic Orchestra.

== See also ==
- Omani Royal Guard Military Band
- Royal Opera House Muscat
