= Muzna Al Musafer =

Omani film director

- Born: 1987; Madinat Al Sultan Qaboos

Muzna Al Musafer (born 1987) is an Omani film director. She is the first female film director in Oman.

Muzna Al Musafer was born in 1987 in Madinat Al Sultan Qaboos in Muscat, Oman. She studied at Kuwait University and Stockholm University.

Her first film, Niqaab, won a student award at the Gulf Film Festival in Dubai in 2010. Her second film, Cholo, is about two young half-brothers, one dark-skinned and one light-skinned, who meet for the first time. It was awarded best script at the Abu Dhabi Film Festival in 2013 and screened around the world. She directed two documentaries, Dana's Goats (2015) and Pashk (2015). Her The Crown of Olives (2017) is about the struggles of two friends, a Moroccan woman and an Omani woman, in Muscat. Her Clouds (2022) is about a rural leopard hunter and his son in Dhofar.

== Filmography ==
- Niqaab (short film, 2010)
- Cholo (short film, 2013)
- بشك/Pashk (short film, 2015)
- عنزات دانا/Dana's Goats (short film, 2015)
- The Crown of Olives (short film, 2017)
- Clouds (short film, 2022)
