= Shati Al-Qurm =

Shatti Al-Qurm شاطئ القرم
- District
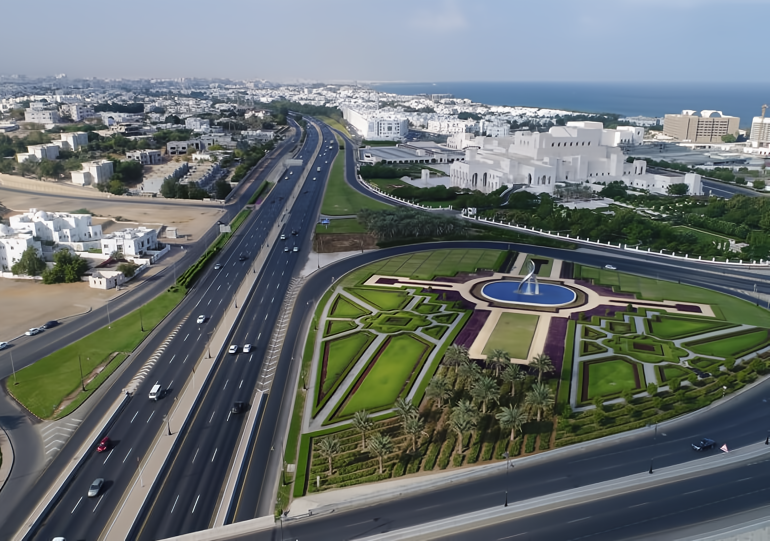
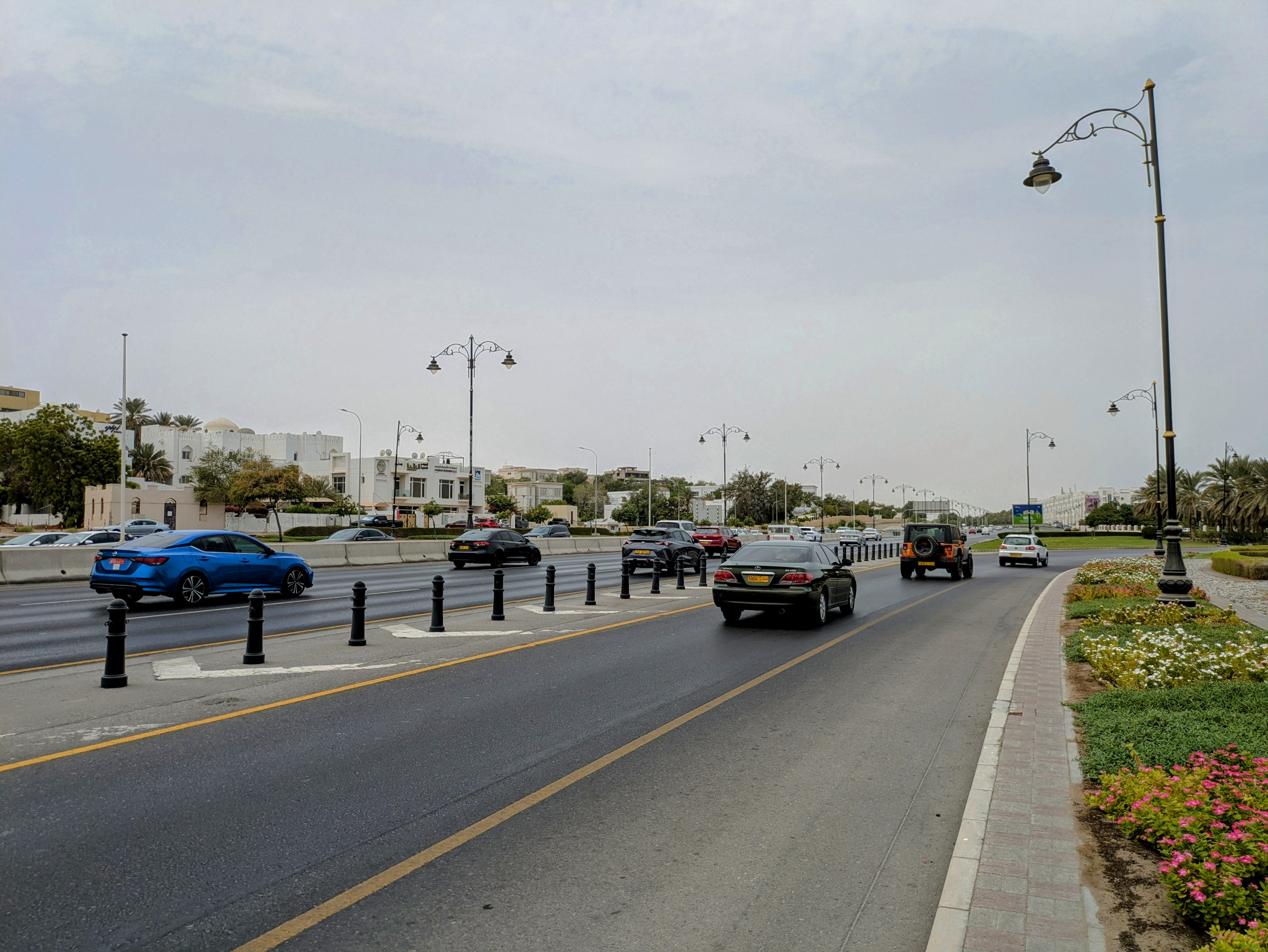
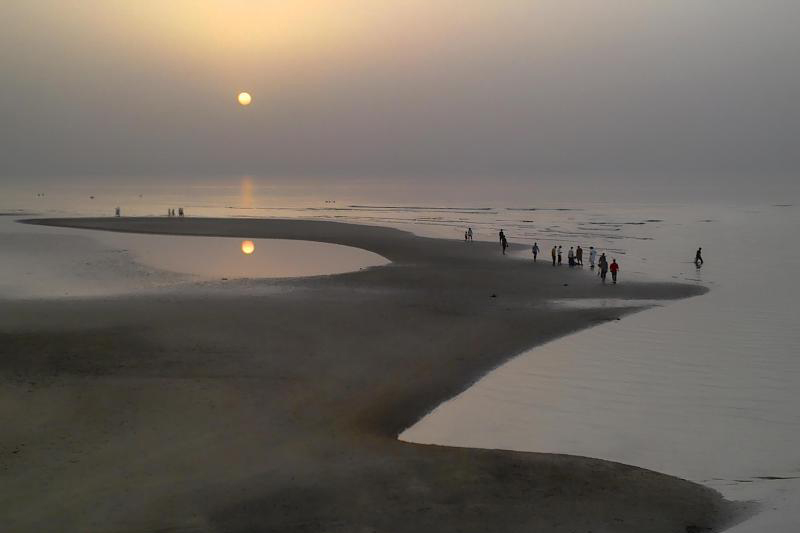
- Top view of Shati al-Qurum district Sultan Qaboos Street Qurum Beach Views of Shatti Al-Qurum district

- Location in Oman
- Coordinates: 23°37′N 58°28′E
- Country: Oman
- Governorate: Muscat Governorate
- Wilayat: Bawshar
- Time zone: UTC+4 (+4)

Shati Al-Qurum (also written Shatti Al-Qurm) is a residential locality and district situated on the coast of Muscat, the capital of the Sultanate of Oman. Known for its upscale businesses and expensive homes, it is also notable for being Muscat's diplomatic district due to many embassies and consulates being located there.

Shatti Al-Qurum is bordered by Qurum to the east, the Ministries and Embassies to the west and Madinat Qaboos to the south. It is a recent development, begun in the mid-1980s. The most noticeable sight while driving down the Sultan Qaboos Street used to be the Intercontinental Hotel but today several other significant constructions have been built. Shati Al-Qurum is also the home of several more hotels including the Grand Hyatt, W Hotel Muscat, Crowne Plaza, and budget hotels such as Days Inn. After Petroleum Development Oman, this is the most popular destination for expatriates living in Muscat.

The common and unique feature to the district is the overwhelming number of white houses. Royal Opera House Muscat, cinema, theatre, schools and a hospital are also located there.

== Etymology ==
Shatti Al-Qurm was named after the large number of qurm (mangrove) trees along with date palms that once grew in the area. In several parts of the coastline, the mangrove shrubs extend into the beach itself. The Ministry of Regional Municipalities and Environment continues to cultivate mangrove trees and implement a coastal afforestation program in the district.

== Geography ==
Shatti Al-Qurm lies on the Gulf of Oman, west of Qurum and east of Al-Khuwair. The district stretches along a long public beach, backed by residential areas and commercial centers. It is located roughly midway between Muttrah and Seeb, making it part of Muscat’s urban core.

The district is often grouped with neighboring Qurm in broader descriptions of Muscat’s coastal districts, though administratively it belongs to Wilayat Bawshar

== Landmarks ==
Shatti Al-Qurm contains a notable concentration of embassies, ambassadorial residences, and other diplomatic premises. The district is also known for its high-end residential areas, which include luxury villas, gated compounds and modern apartment buildings.

Commercial activity in the area is centred around the beachfront, where numerous restaurants, cafés and boutique shops are located. Several major international hotels such as the Crowne Plaza Muscat, InterContinental Muscat and Grand Hyatt Muscatare situated in or near the district. Adjacent to the beach, in Qurm Heights, stands the Royal Opera House Muscat, an important cultural opera house that adds to the area’s prominence.

Shatti Al-Qurm’s public beach is among the busiest in Muscat. The wide sandy shore and palm-lined corniche attract walkers, joggers, families and visitors throughout the year, and the beach is a popular site for picnics and various water-based activities.

== Administration ==
Shatti Al-Qurm is officially part of Wilayat Bawshar, one of six wilayat that make up the Muscat Governorate

== See also ==
- Muscat Governorate
- Bawshar
- Qurm, Oman
- Royal Opera House Muscat
