= Ali bin Masoud al Sunaidy =

Omani politician

Minister of Commerce and Industry

Personal details
- Born: December 28, 1964 (age 61) Muscat, Oman
- Occupation: Politician

Ali bin Masoud al Sunaidy (born December 28, 1964, in Muscat, Oman) is an Omani politician. He was the Minister of Commerce and Industry in Oman. In 2018, he was the Minister of Commerce and Industry and was the Deputy Chairman of the Oman Supreme Council for Planning.
