= Ministry of Commerce, Industry and Investment Promotion (Oman) =

Coordinates: 23°35′45″N 58°33′3″E

Sultanate of Oman Ministry of Commerce, Industry & Investment Promotion
- وزارة التجارة والصناعة وترويج الاستثمار
- National emblem of Oman

Agency overview
- Jurisdiction: Government of Oman
- Headquarters: Muscat (Oman)
- Agency executive: Anwar bin Hilal bin Hamdoun Al-Jabri, Minister
- Child agency: Oman Chamber of Commerce and Industry
- Website: Official website

The Ministry of Commerce, Industry & Investment Promotion is an Omani government department responsible for commercial regulation, industrial development, and investment promotion. Its responsibilities include business registration, commercial licensing, industrial policy, export promotion and competition regulation. Following organisational restructuring on 18 August 2020, the ministry began operating under its current name.

The current Minister is Anwar bin Hilal bin Hamdoun Al-Jabri, who was appointed in January 2026.

== History ==
The Ministry of Commerce and Industry was established in 1974, two years after the Department of Industry was set up within the Ministry of Development. The new ministry included a Directorate General for Industry, responsible for promoting industrial development in Oman.

On 18 August 2020, Royal Decree 97/2020 changed the name of the Ministry of Commerce and Industry to the Ministry of Commerce, Industry and Investment Promotion. The assets, responsibilities and employees of both the Public Authority for Investment Promotion and Export Development and the Competition Protection and Monopoly Prevention Centre were transferred to the ministry. Both authorities were subsequently abolished as separate institutions.

== Organizational Chart ==
=== The Ministry operates through its organizational structure consisting of ===
- The Minister, which includes: the Sultanate's commercial offices abroad, the office of the Sultanate of Oman
- Dubai Commercial, Investment Services Center, General Directorate of Planning and Follow-up, Minister's Office, Consultants, Ministry Security Office, Legal Department, Internal Audit Department, Auditors Service Department, Documents Department, Electronic Information Security Section.
- The Undersecretary, which includes: the Office of the Undersecretary, the Experts, the General Directorate of Commerce, the Directorate General of Industry, the Directorate General of Organizations and Commercial Relations, the Directorate General of Standards and Metrology, the Directorate General of Commerce and Industry in North Al Batinah Governorate, the Directorate General of Commerce and Industry in the Dhofar Governorate, the Directorate General of Administrative and Financial Affairs, The departments of commerce and industry in the governorates.

== See also ==
- List of company registers
