= Royal Opera House Muscat =

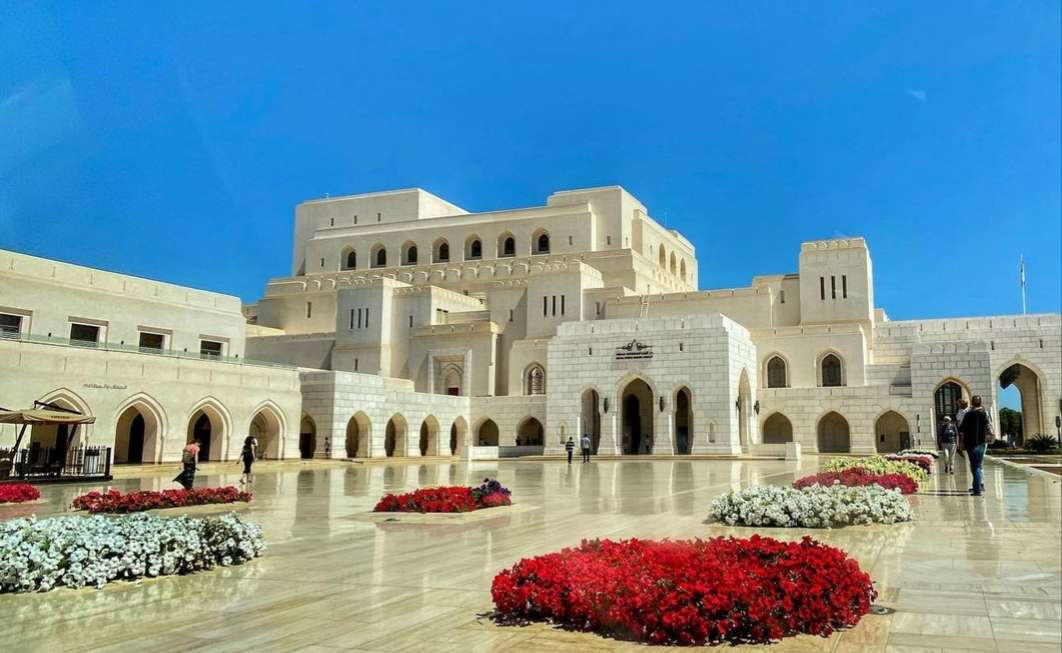
- Royal Opera House

- Location within Oman

General information
- Type: Arts Complex
- Architectural style: Islamic architecture Italianate architecture
- Location: Muscat, Oman
- Construction started: 2007
- Completed: 2011
- Opened: October 12, 2011

Design and construction
- Main contractor: Carillion Alawi

Website
- https://www.rohmuscat.org.om/en

The Royal Opera House Muscat (ROHM) is Oman's premier venue for musical arts and culture. The opera house is located in Shati Al-Qurm district of Muscat on Sultan Qaboos Street. Built on the royal orders of Sultan Qaboos of Oman, the Royal Opera House reflects unique contemporary Omani architecture, and has a capacity to accommodate maximum of 1,100 people. The opera house complex consists of a concert theatre, auditorium, formal landscaped gardens, cultural market with retail, luxury restaurants and an art centre for musical, theatrical and operatic productions. Opened in 2011, the venue is one of Oman’s main institutions for the performing arts, presenting opera, orchestral music, ballet and other stage productions. Its main auditorium is designed as a flexible performance space that can be adapted for different types of productions.

== History ==
Sultan Qaboos bin Said Al Said, who was the ruler of Oman during the opera construction, had been always a fan of classical music and arts. In 2001, the sultan ordered the building of an opera house. Initially called 'House of Musical Arts', the name 'Royal Opera House Muscat (ROHM)' was finally chosen. This opera house, which was built by Carillion Alawi, became the first in the world equipped with Radio Marconi's multimedia interactive display seatback system, Mode23. It was officially opened on October 12, 2011, with a production of the opera Turandot, conducted by Spanish tenor Plácido Domingo.

== Architecture and facilities ==
The Royal Opera House Muscat complex includes a concert theatre, auditorium, formal landscaped gardens, a cultural market with retail spaces, luxury restaurants and an art centre for musical, theatrical and operatic productions. The building reflects contemporary Omani architecture, while its performance spaces were designed to accommodate a range of stage productions and cultural events.

== Prominent guests ==
The opera house had an impressive first season, with performances by Plácido Domingo, Andrea Bocelli, and soprano Renée Fleming. There have also been music performances by cellist Yo Yo Ma and the London Philharmonic Orchestra, the American Ballet Theatre in a production of Don Quixote, The Paul Taylor Dance Company, the performance of Swan Lake by the Mariinsky Ballet, and trumpeter Wynton Marsalis with New York's Jazz at Lincoln Center Orchestra. There have been some Arab artists performing at the opera house as well such as Majida El Roumi as well as a tribute in honour of legendary Arab singer Um Kalthoum. In March 2013, Indian violin icon L. Subramaniam performed at the opera house and described it as the only orchestra in the Middle East composed entirely of musicians from the region.

== Gallery ==
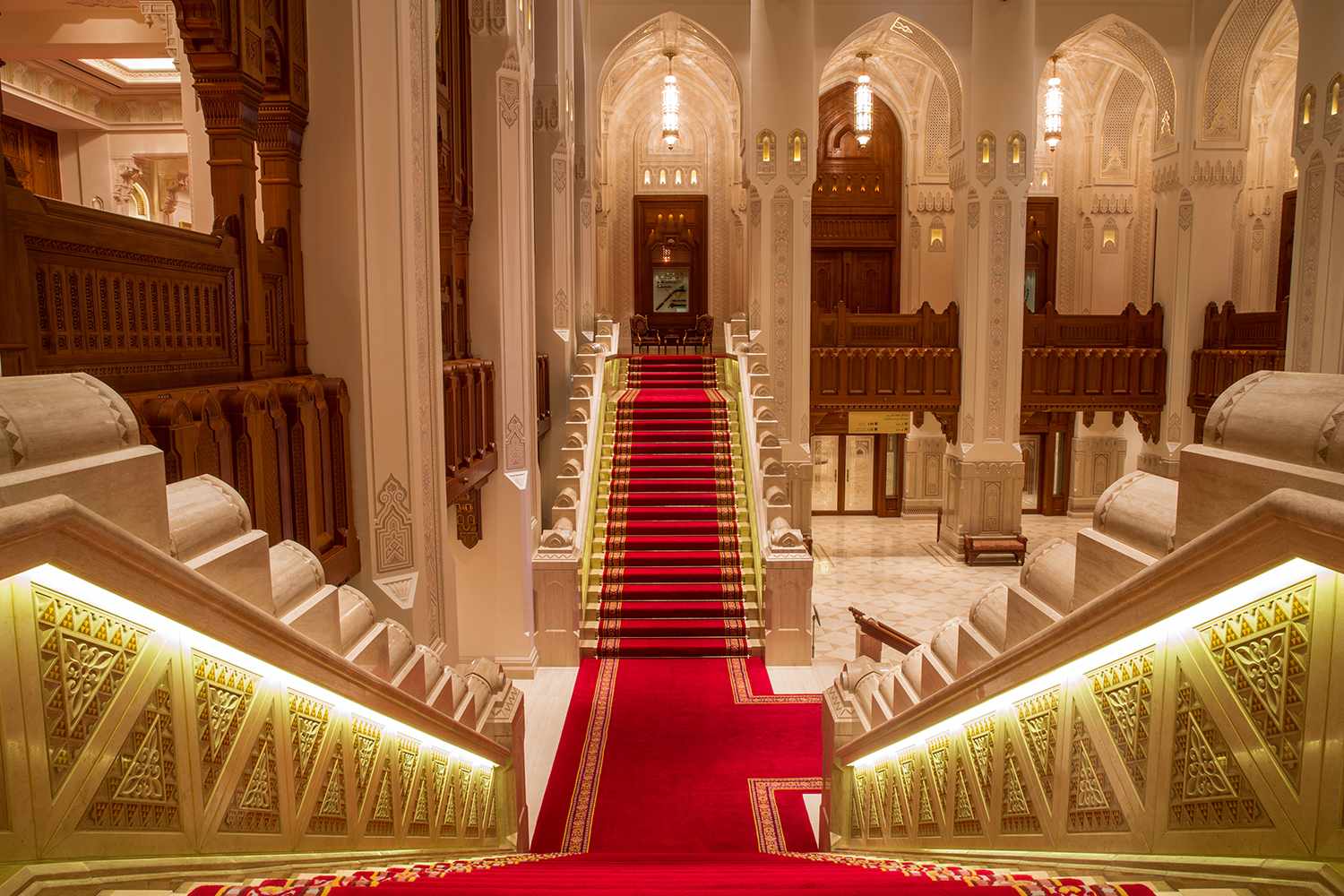
ROHM's main lobby

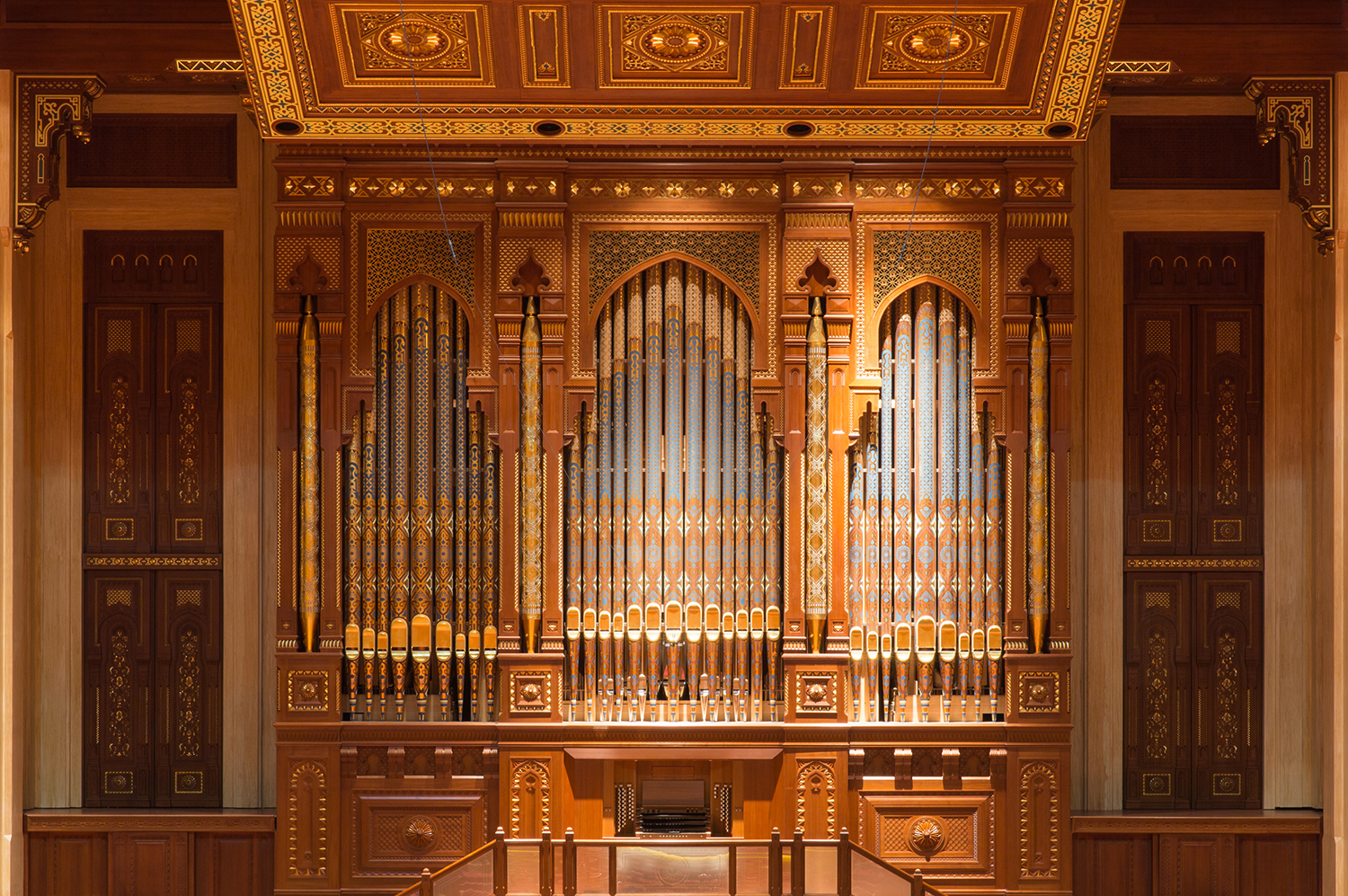
ROHM's pipe organ

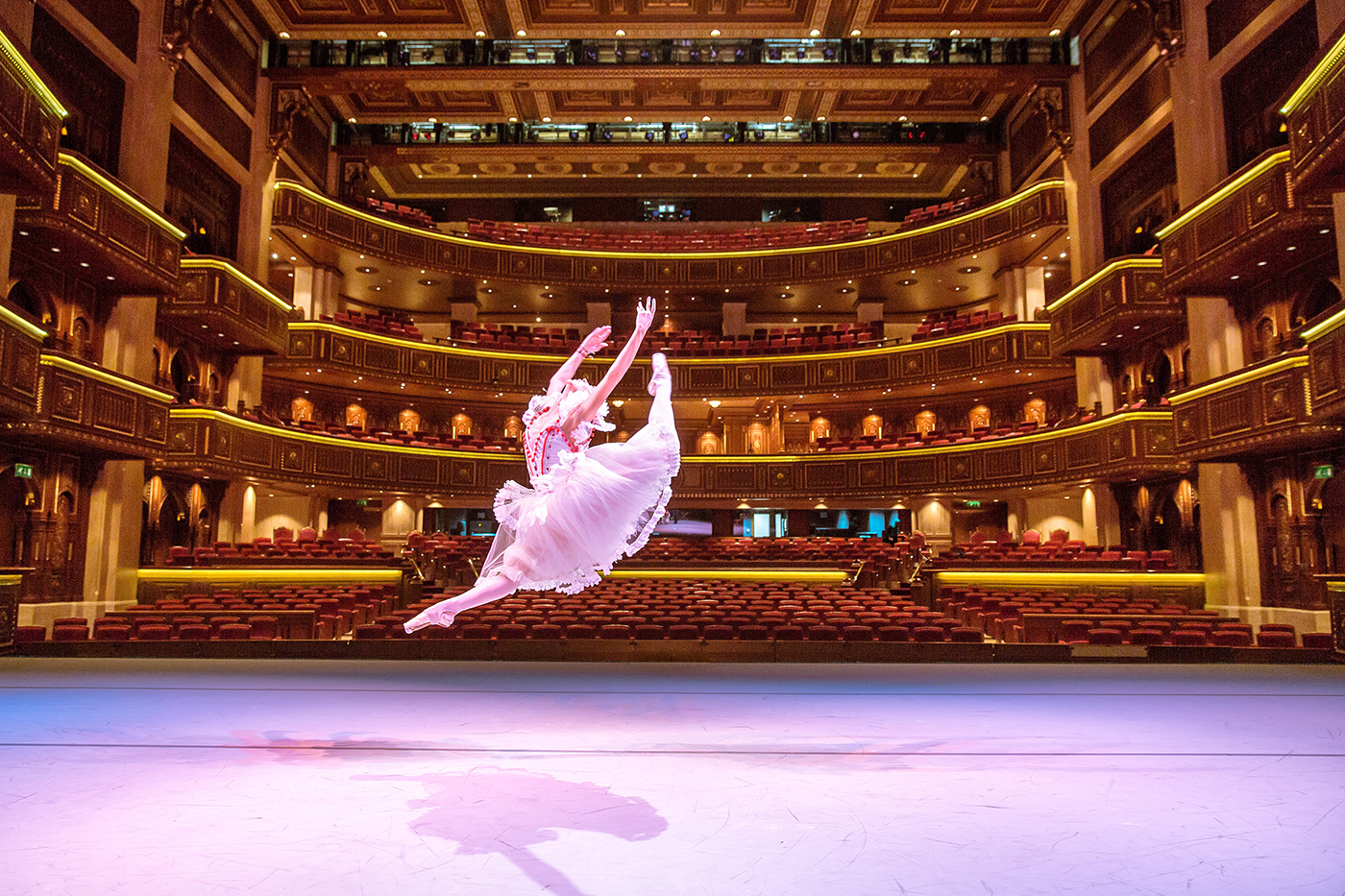
Cuban National Ballet rehearsing on the ROHM's stage

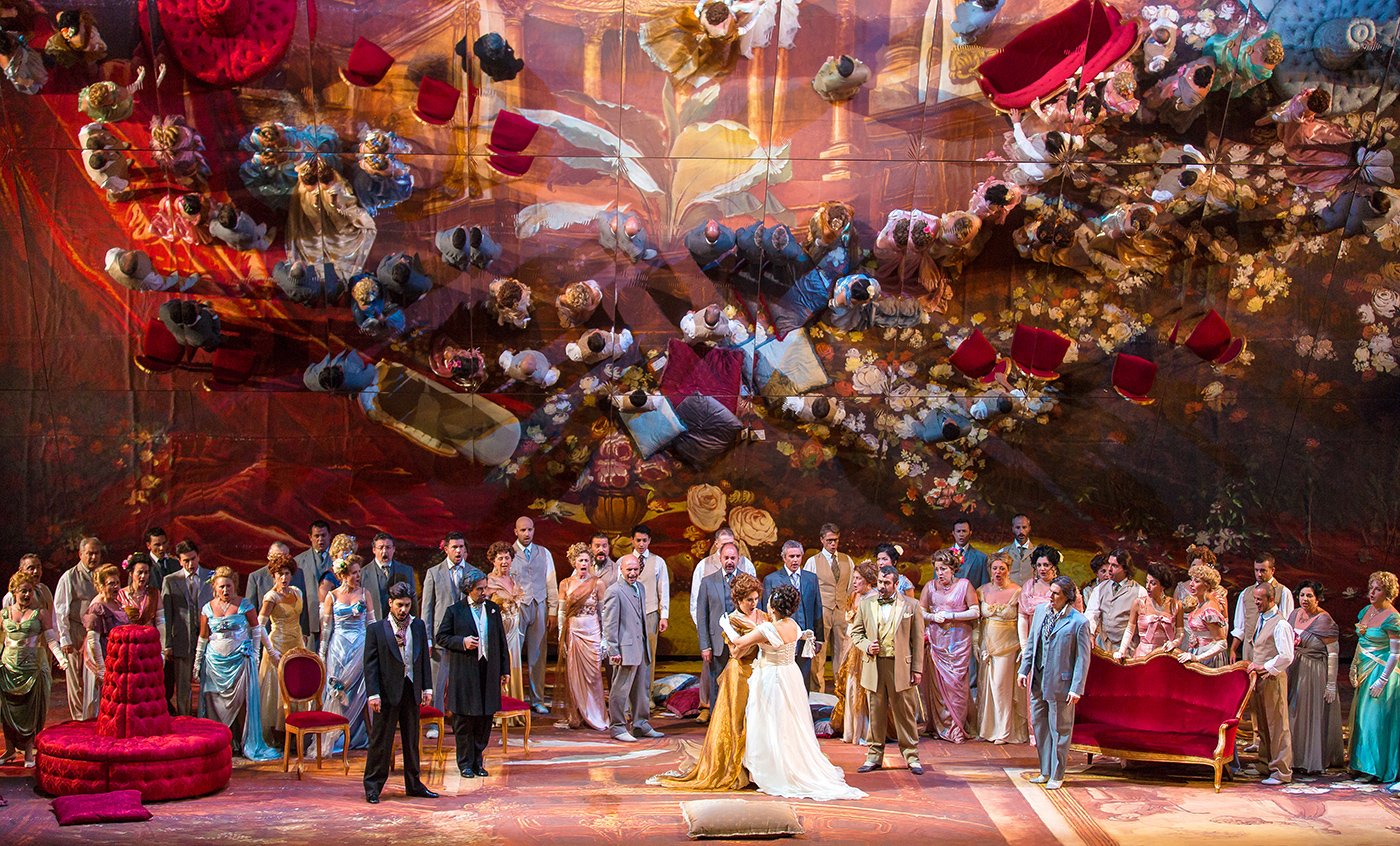
La traviata, opera by Giuseppe Verdi, October 2013

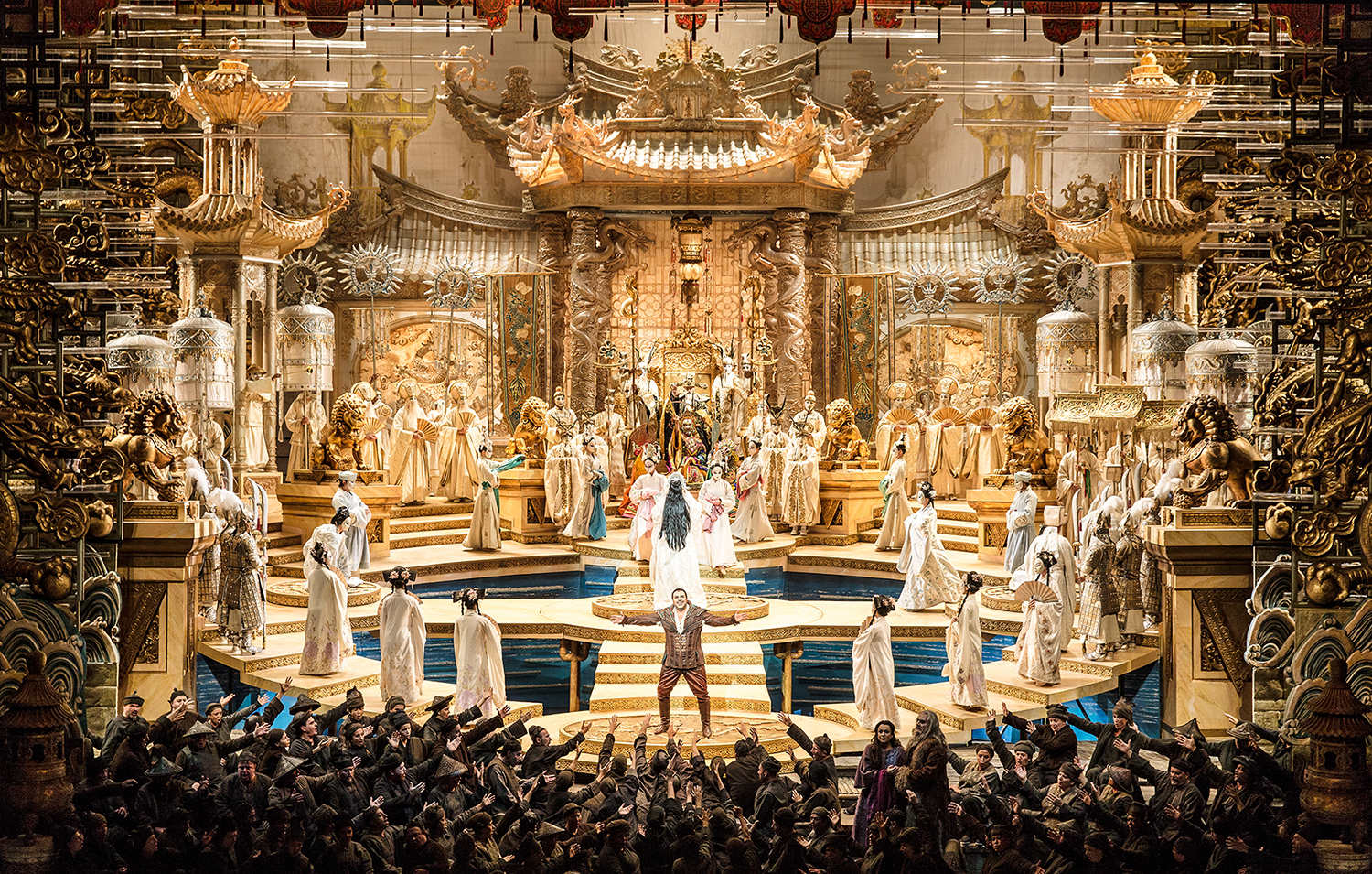
Turandot, opera by Giacomo Puccini at the stage of the Royal Opera House Muscat

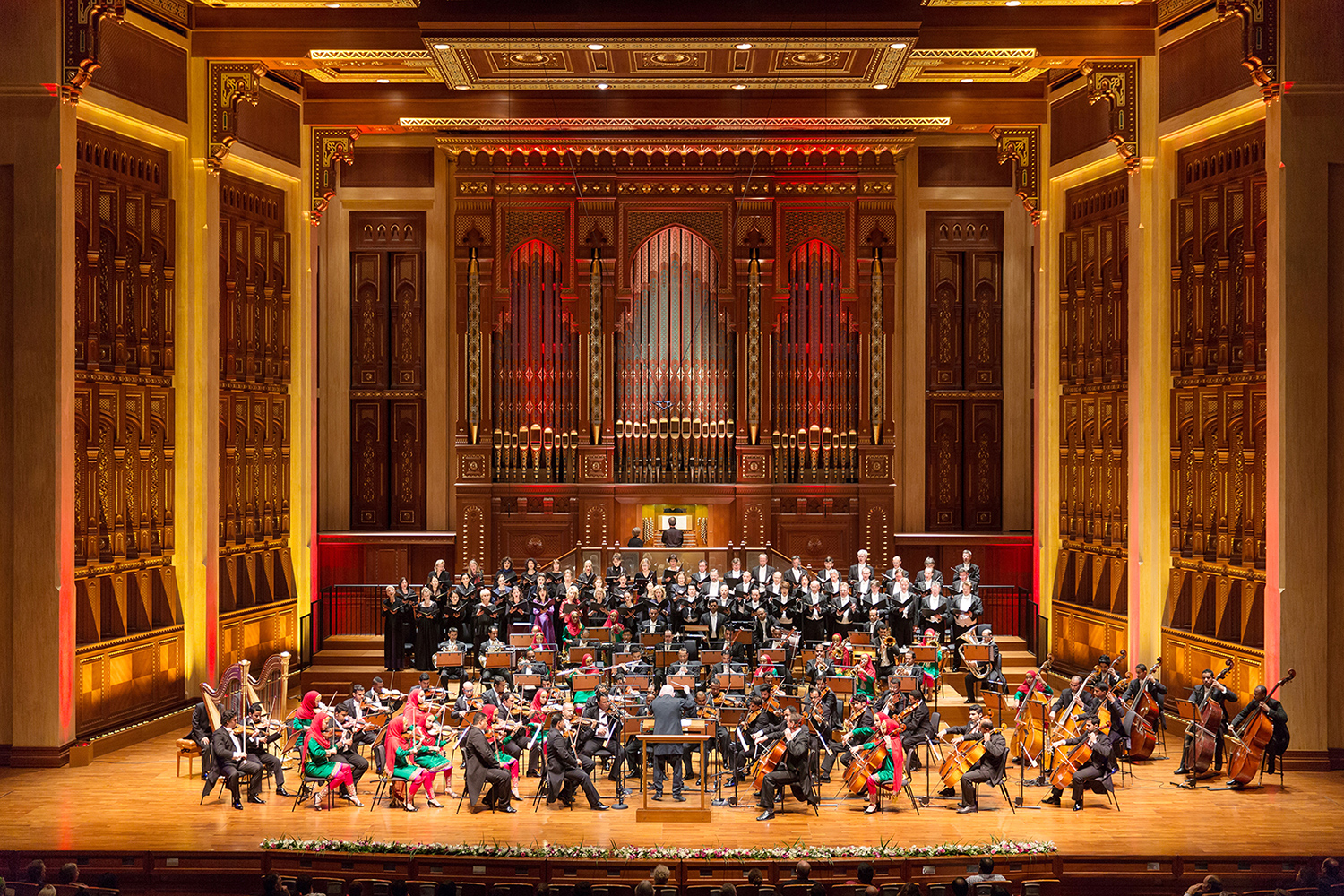
Pipe organ concert with the Royal Oman Symphony Orchestra
