= Oman Avenues Mall =

Shopping mall in Oman

Coordinates: 23.590208°N 58.411101°E

Oman Avenues Mall

Oman Avenues Mall is one of the largest shopping malls in Oman. It is a division of LuLu Group International based at Abu Dhabi. It was inaugurated in May 2015, under the patronage of M.A Yusuff Ali, MD, Lulu Group, along with other key members of the Lulu management.
