= Madinat Al Sultan Qaboos =

Madinat Al Sultan Qaboos مدينة السلطان قابوس
- Town
- Location in Oman
- Coordinates: 23°36′0″N 58°27′2″E
- Country: Oman
- Governorate: Muscat Governorate
- Time zone: UTC+4 (+4)

Madinat Al Sultan Qaboos (Arabic: مدينة السلطان قابوس) is a suburb of Muscat, the capital of the Sultanate of Oman. The Name "Madinat Al Sultan Qaboos" is an Arabic phrase that means "City of Sultan Qaboos." Sultan Qaboos was the monarch of the Sultanate of Oman, until Jan 2020. Madinat Al Sultan Qaboos (or Madinat Qaboos and MQ for short) is a predominantly upscale residential area located in the center of Muscat Governorate.

Nearby suburbs include Al-Khuwair, Shati Al-Qurm and Qurum. It is situated 6 kilometer from the sea and is well connected to the rest of the city by the arterial highway, Sultan Qaboos Street that separates the suburb from Shatti Al Qurum and the sea. Until the growth of Shatti Al Qurum in the 1990s, Madinat Qaboos is one of the most expensive residential areas in Muscat. It is also a popular choice of residence for expatriate workers in Muscat, particularly Westerners.

Madinat Qaboos contains one of the oldest shopping centres in the city and it is currently undergoing a period of expansion following the demolition of Matrah Cold Stores supermarket. While the expansion plans include a cinema, there are already several shops and restaurants located in the shopping centre including KFC, McDonald's, Pizza Hut, Starbucks, Pavo Real (a Mexican restaurant famed for its Karaoke Monday Nights), Kargeens (a popular open-air sheesha cafe) and Ziyara (another shisha bar with open-air seats outside along with an inside facility).

== Gallery ==
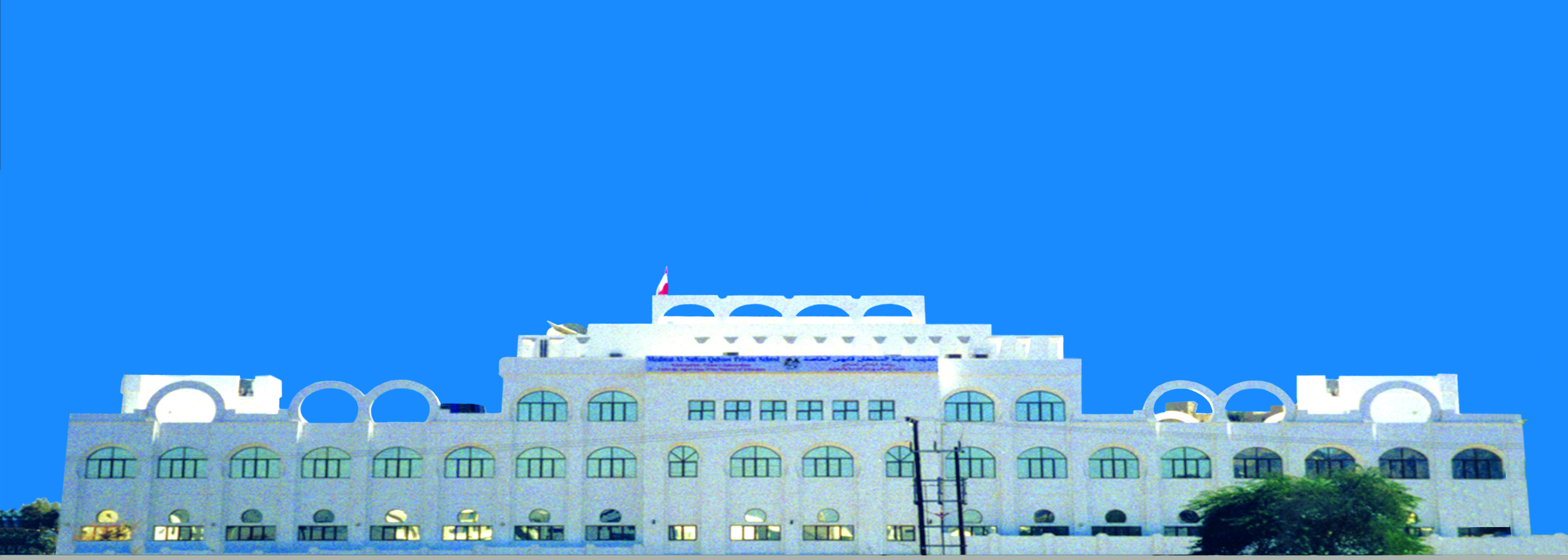
The school building at Madinat Qaboos in Oman by Basil Al Bayati
