= Muscat =

Capital and largest city of Oman

Muscat مَسْقَط
- Capital city and Metropolis
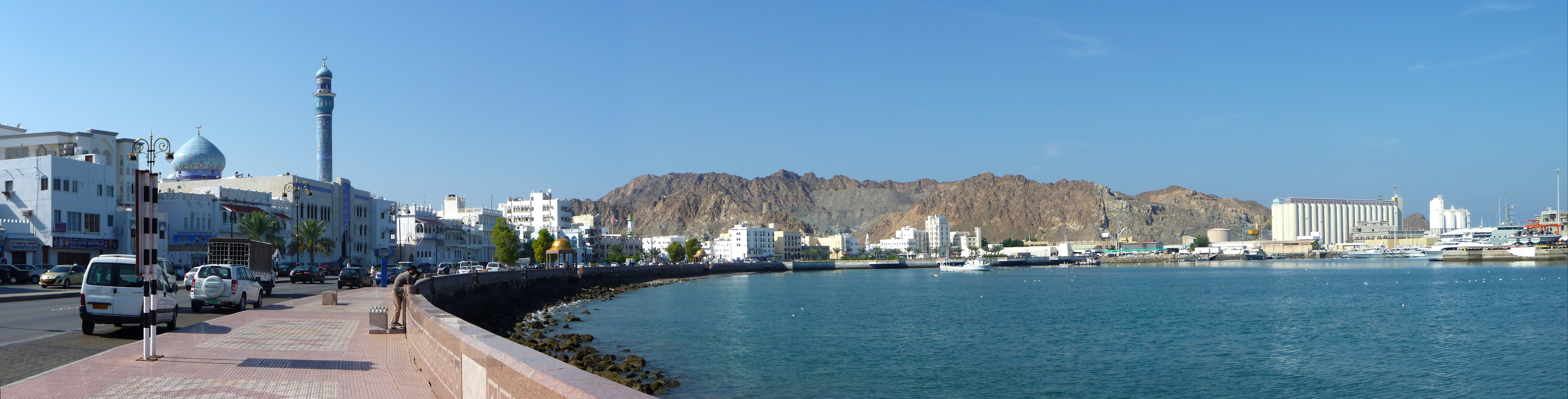
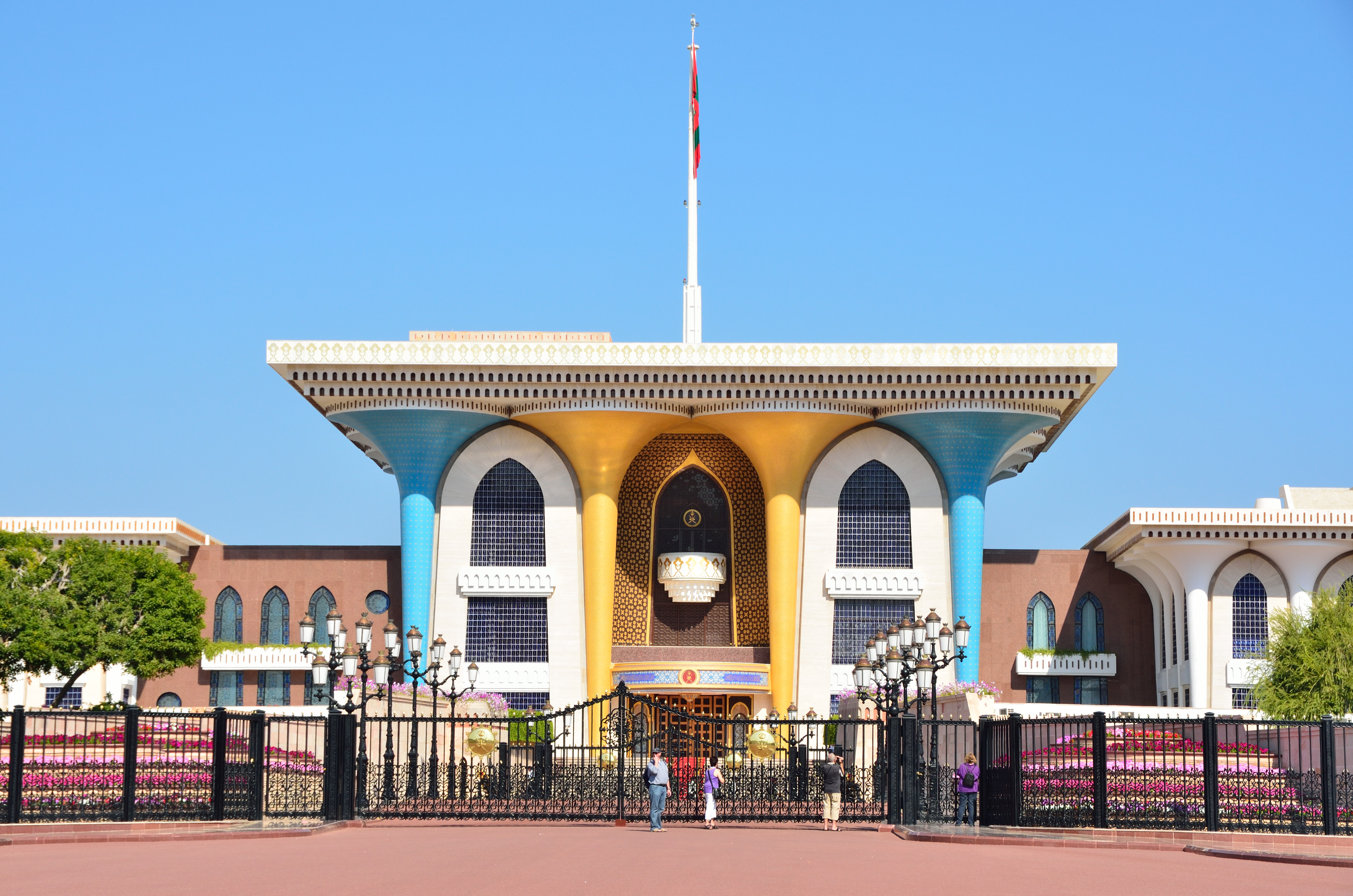
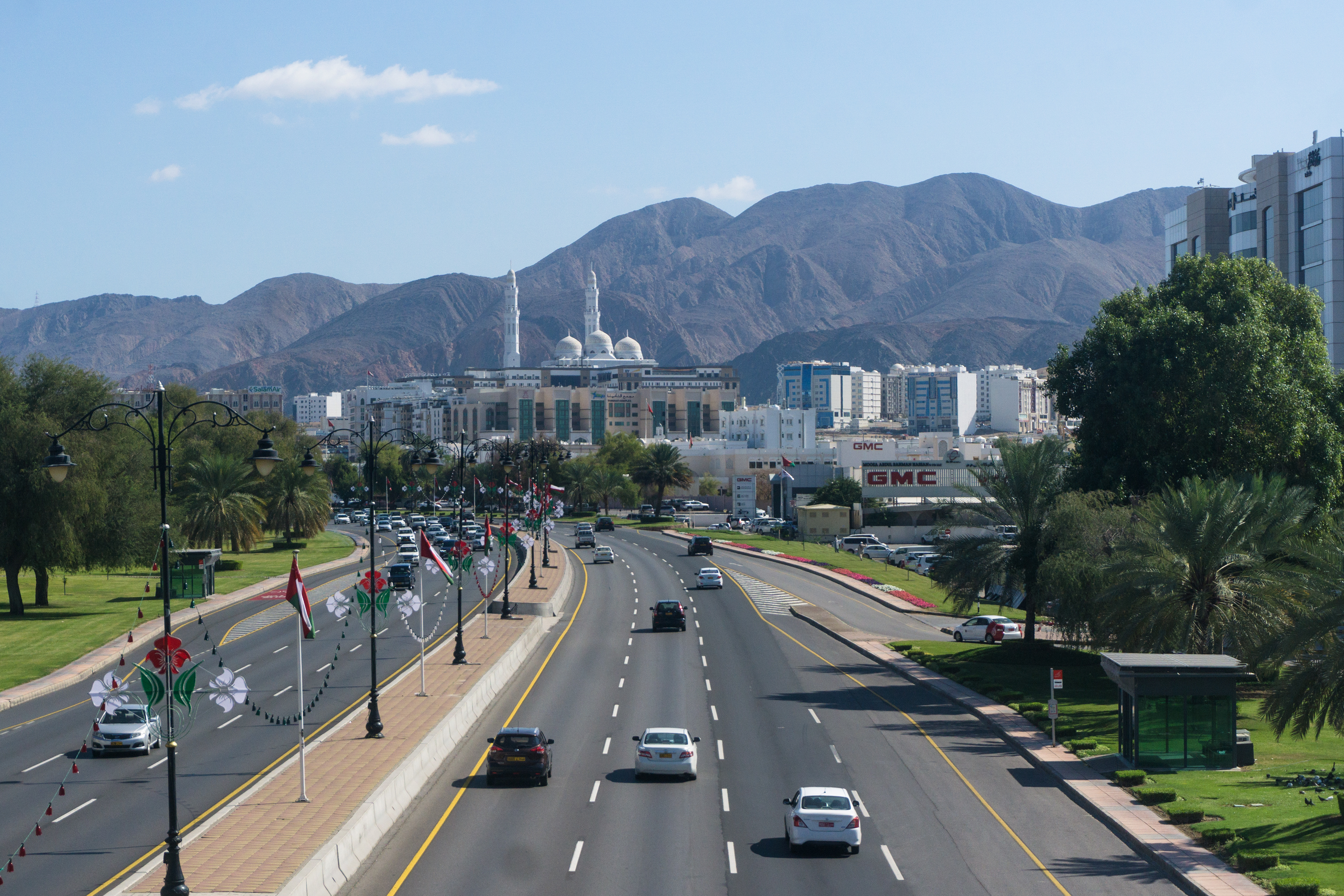
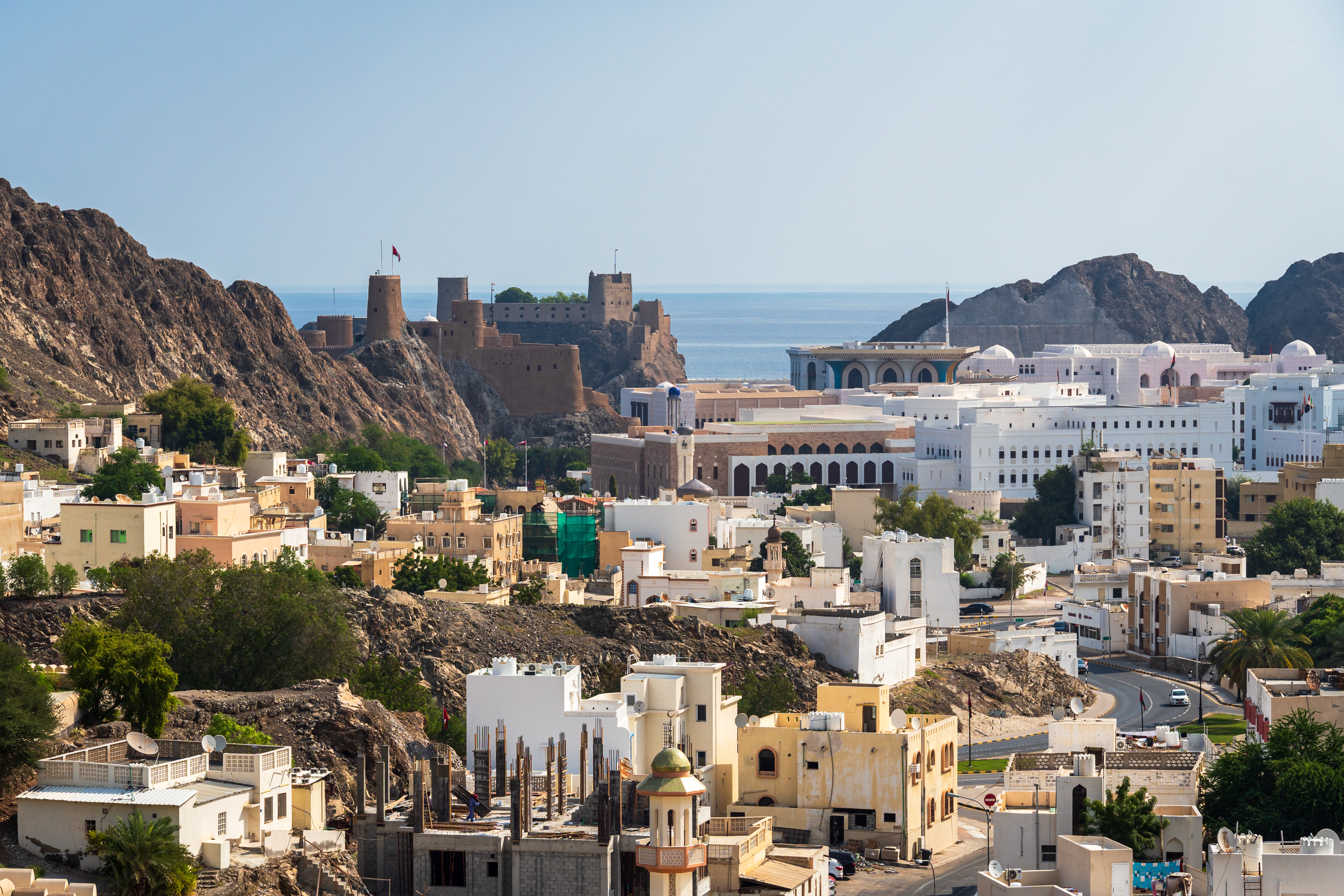
- Muttrah Al Alam Palace Sultan Qaboos Grand Mosque Sultan Qaboos Street Old Muscat

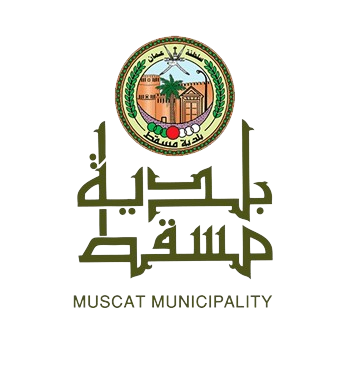
- Flag Emblem
- Nickname: The Pearl of Arabia
- Interactive map of Muscat
- Location of Muscat in Oman Muscat (Asia)
- Coordinates: 23°35′20″N 58°24′30″E
- Country: Oman
- Governorate: Muscat Governorate

Government
  - Type: Absolute monarchy
  - Sultan: Haitham bin Tariq Al Said

Area
  - Land: 6,500 km^{2} (2,500 sq mi)

Population (2023)
  - Capital city and Metropolis: 1,720,000 (urban area); 31,409 (Old Muscat Wilayat)
  - Density: 491/km^{2} (1,270/sq mi)
  - Metro: 1,720,000
- Demonym: Muscatian
- Time zone: UTC+04:00 (GST)
- Website: mm.gov.om

Muscat (/ˈmʌskæt, ˈmʌskət/ MUSK-at, -ət, US also /ˈmʌskɑːt/ -aht; Arabic: مَسْقَط, romanized: Masqaṭ, pronounced [ˈmasqatˤ]) is the capital and most populous city of Oman. It is the seat of the Governorate of Muscat. According to the National Centre for Statistics and Information (NCSI), the population of the Muscat Governorate in 2022 was 1.72 million. The metropolitan area includes six provinces, called wilayat, and spans approximately 6,500 km^{2} (2,500 sq mi). The Hajar Mountains dominate the view from Muscat. The city lies on the Gulf of Oman, near the strategically important Strait of Hormuz. Low-lying white buildings are a typical feature of its architecture. The city's port district of Muttrah, with its corniche and harbour, are at the north-eastern edge of the city. Muscat's economy is dominated by trade, petroleum, liquified natural gas and porting.

Known since the early 1st century CE as a leading port for trade between the west and the east, Muscat was ruled successively by various indigenous tribes, as well as by foreign powers such as the Persians, the Portuguese Empire and the Ottoman Empire. In the 18th century, Muscat was a regional military power: its influence extended as far as East Africa and Zanzibar. As an important port town in the Gulf of Oman, Muscat attracted foreign traders and settlers such as the Persians, the Balochs and the Sindhis. Beginning in 1970, after the accession of Qaboos bin Said as the Sultan of Oman, Muscat experienced rapid infrastructural development; it developed a vibrant economy and became a multi-ethnic society. The Globalization and World Cities Research Network classifies Muscat as a Beta-level Global City.

== Toponymy ==
Ptolemy's Map of Arabia identifies the territories of Cryptus Portus and Moscha Portus. Scholars are divided in opinion on which of the two is related to the city of Muscat. Similarly, Arrianus references Omana and Moscha in Voyage of Nearchus. Interpretations of Arrianus' work by William Vincent and Jean Baptiste Bourguignon d'Anville conclude that Omana was a reference to Oman, while Moscha referred to Muscat. Similarly, other scholars identify Pliny the Elder's reference to Amithoscuta to be Muscat.

The origin of the word Muscat is disputed. Some authors claim that the word has Arabic origins from moscha, meaning an 'inflated hide' or 'skin'. Other authors claim that the name Muscat means 'anchorage' or 'the place of "letting fall the anchor"'. Other derivations include muscat from Old Persian, meaning strong-scented, or from Arabic, meaning 'falling-place', or 'hidden'. Cryptus Portus is synonymous with Oman ('hidden land'). But Ov-man (Omman), and the old Sumerian name Magan (Maa-kan), means 'sea-people' in Arabic. An inhabitant is a Muscatter, Muscatian, Muscatite or Muscatan. In 1793 AD the capital was transferred from Rustaq to Muscat.

== History ==
Evidence of communal activity in the area around Muscat dates back to the 6th millennium BC in Ras al-Hamra, where burial sites of fishermen have been found. The graves appear to be well formed and indicate the existence of burial rituals. South of Muscat, remnants of Harappan pottery indicate some level of contact with the Indus Valley civilisation. Muscat's notability as a port was acknowledged as early as the 1st century AD by the Greek geographer Ptolemy, who referred to it as Cryptus Portus (the Hidden Port), and by Pliny the Elder, who called it Amithoscuta.

The port fell to a Sassanid invasion in the 3rd century AD, under the rule of Shapur I. Conversion to Islam occurred during the 7th century. Muscat's importance as a trading port continued to grow in the centuries that followed, under the influence of the Azd dynasty, a local tribe. The establishment of the First Imamate in the 9th century was the first step in consolidating disparate Omani tribal factions under the banner of an Ibadi state. However, tribal skirmishes continued, allowing the Abbasids of Baghdad to conquer Oman. The Abbasids occupied the region until the 11th century, when they were driven out by the local Yahmad tribe. Power over Oman shifted from the Yahmad tribe to the Azdi Nabahinah clan, during whose rule, the people of coastal ports such as Muscat prospered from maritime trade and close alliances with the Indian subcontinent, at the cost of the alienation of the people of the interior of Oman.

The Portuguese admiral Afonso de Albuquerque sailed to Muscat in 1507, in an attempt to establish trade relations. As he approached the harbour, his ships were fired on. He then decided to conquer Muscat. Most of the city burned to the ground during and after the fighting. The Portuguese maintained a hold on Muscat for over a century, despite challenges from Persia and a bombardment of the town by the Ottoman Turks in 1546. The Turks twice captured Muscat from the Portuguese, in the Capture of Muscat (1552) and 1581–88.

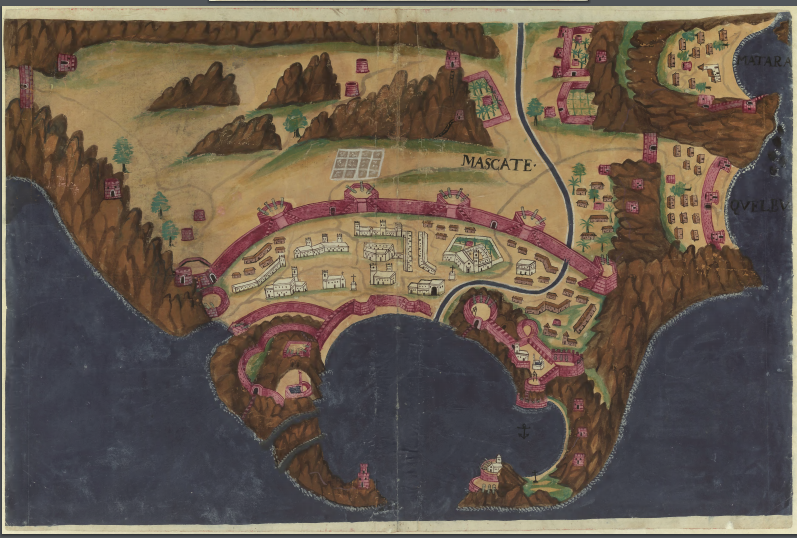
Muscat (Mascate) Portuguese Fortress in the 17th century. António Bocarro Book of Fortress.

The election of Nasir bin Murshid Al-Ya'rubi as Imam of Oman in 1624 changed the balance of power again in the region, from the Persians and the Portuguese to local Omanis. Among the most important castles and forts in Muscat, the Al Jalali Fort and the Al-Mirani Fort are the most prominent buildings left by the Portuguese. On August 16, 1648, the Imam dispatched an army to Muscat, which captured and demolished the high towers of the Portuguese, weakening their grip over the town. Decisively, in 1650, a small but determined body of the Imam's troops attacked the port at night, forcing an eventual Portuguese surrender on January 23, 1650. A civil war and repeated incursions by the Persian king Nader Shah in the 18th century destabilised the region, and further strained relations between the interior and Muscat. This power vacuum in Oman led to the emergence of the Al Bu Sa‘id dynasty, which has ruled Oman ever since.

"Muscat is a large and very populous town, flanked on both sides with high mountains and the front is close to the water's edge; behind, towards the interior, there is a plain as large as the square of Lisbon, all covered with salt pans. [T]here are orchards, gardens, and palm groves with wells for watering them by means of swipes and other engines. The harbour is small, shaped like a horse-shoe and sheltered from every wind."

— Afonso de Albuquerque, after the fall of Muscat, in 1507.

Muscat's naval and military supremacy was re-established in the 19th century by Said bin Sultan, who signed a treaty with U.S. President Andrew Jackson's representative Edmund Roberts on September 21, 1833. Having gained control over Zanzibar, in 1840 Said moved his capital to Stone Town, the ancient quarter of Zanzibar City; however, after his death in 1856, control over Zanzibar was lost when it became an independent sultanate under his sixth son, Majid bin Said (1834/5–1870), while the third son, Thuwaini bin Said, became the Sultan of Oman.

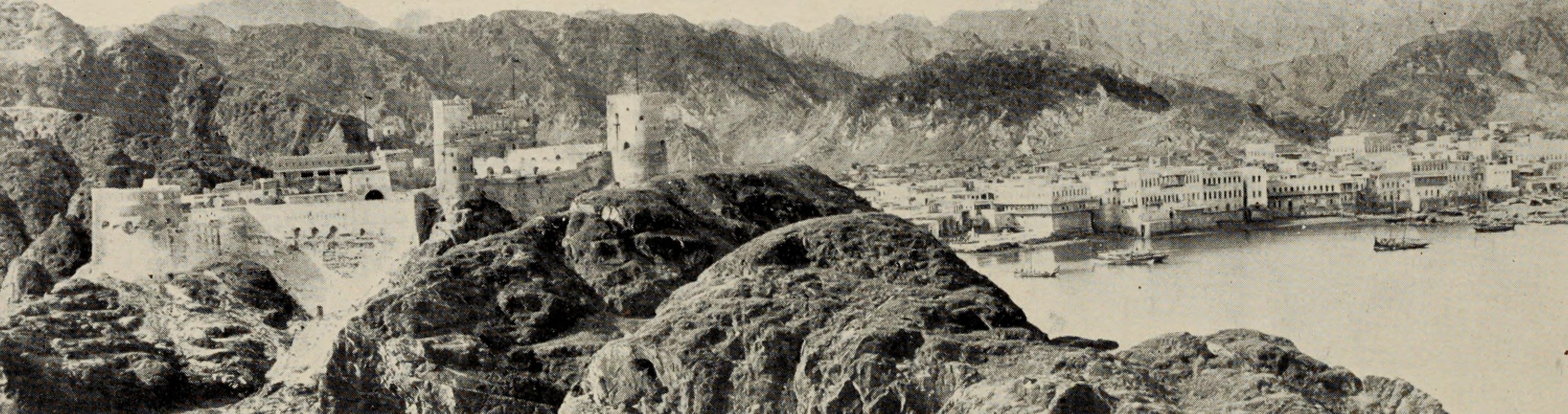
A view of Muscat, ca. 1902

By the 19th century, a large Hindu merchant community in the port city dominated its commercial life. It is argued that their settlement began in the fifteenth century; the Portuguese relied heavily on them to secure a trade monopoly in the Indian Ocean and Persian Gulf area. The Sindhis were amongst the first during this era, followed by the Kutchis. The merchant community played an important role in expelling the Europeans in 1650. They were not affected by civil war that established the Al Bu Sa‘id dynasty and continued to prosper under Ahmad bin Said al-Busaidi. Important trade existed between the city and Thatta, and later, Kutch, expanding to other parts of India.

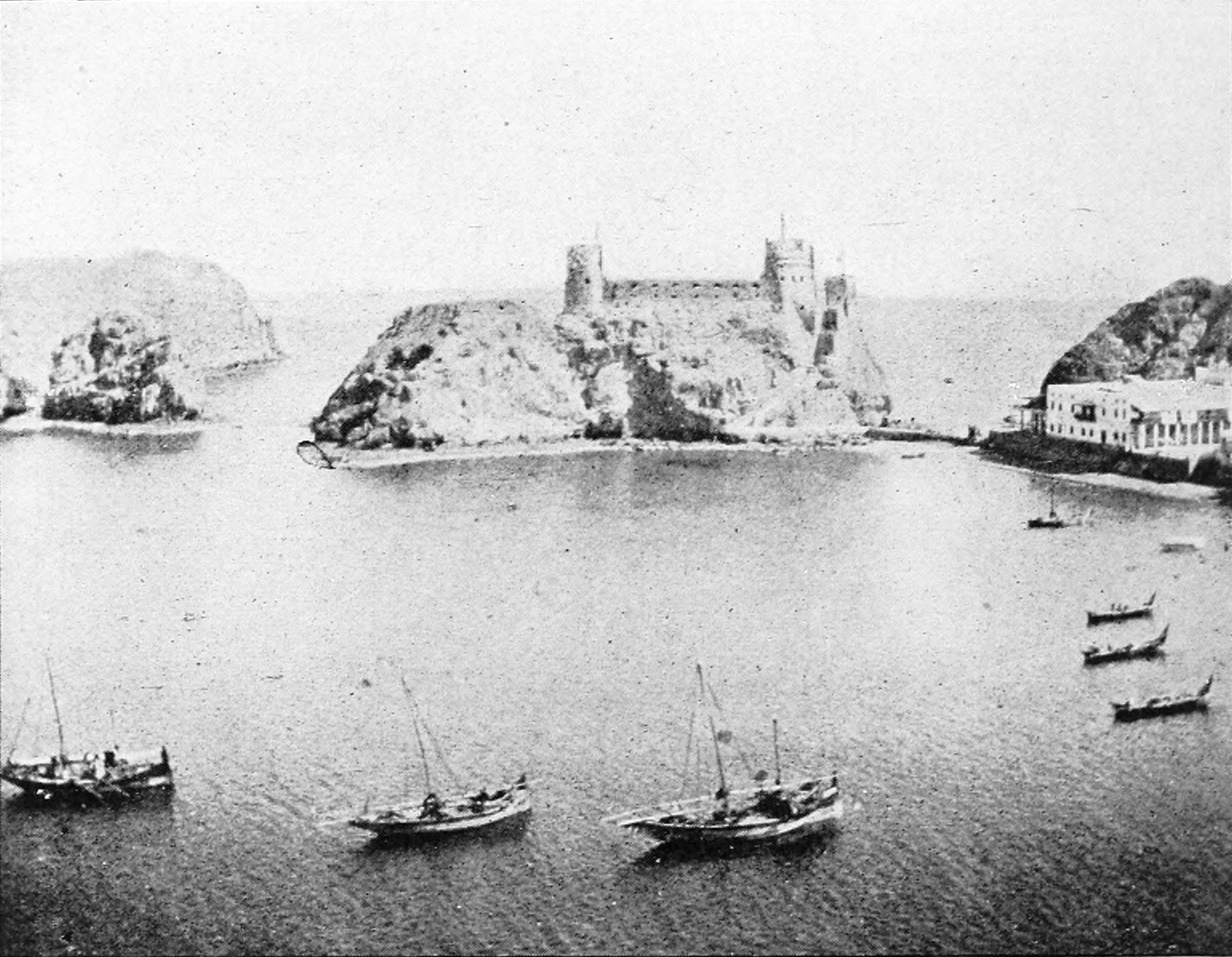
Muscat harbour, ca. 1903. Visible in the background is Fort Al Jalali.

During the second half of the 19th century, the fortunes of the Al Bu Sa‘id declined and friction with the Imams of the interior resurfaced. Muscat and Muttrah were attacked by tribes from the interior in 1895 and again in 1915. A tentative ceasefire was brokered by the British, which gave the interior more autonomy. However, conflicts among the disparate tribes of the interior, and with the Sultan of Muscat and Oman continued into the 1950s, and eventually escalated into the Dhofar Rebellion (1962). The rebellion forced the Sultan Said bin Taimur to seek the assistance of the British in quelling the uprisings from the interior. The failed assassination attempt of April 26, 1966 on Said bin Taimur led to the further isolation of the Sultan, who had moved his residence from Muscat to Salalah amidst the conflict. On July 23, 1970, Qaboos bin Said, son of the Sultan, staged a bloodless coup d'état in the Salalah palace with the assistance of the British, and took over as ruler.

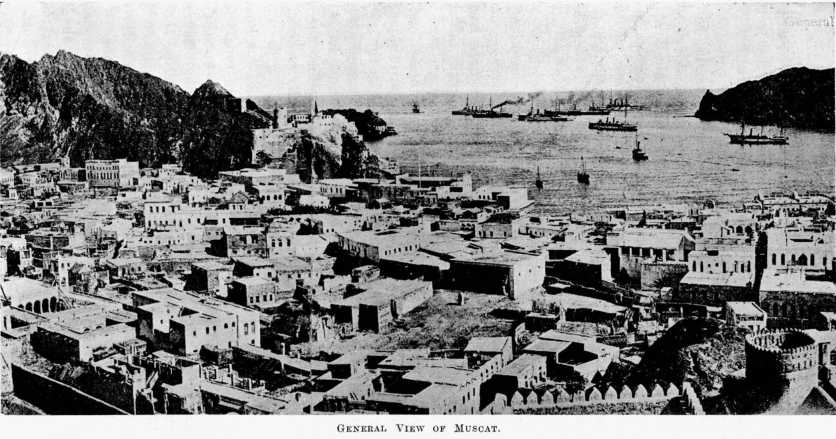
Muscat harbour during World War I

With the assistance of the British, Qaboos bin Said put an end to the Dhofar uprising and consolidated disparate tribal territories. He renamed the country the Sultanate of Oman (called Muscat and Oman hitherto), in an attempt to end to the interior's isolation from Muscat. Qaboos enlisted the services of capable Omanis to fill positions in his new government, drawing from such corporations as Petroleum Development Oman. New ministries for social services such as health and education were established. The construction of Mina Qaboos, a new port conceived initially by Sa‘id bin Taimur, was developed during the early days of Qaboos' rule. Similarly, a new international airport was developed in Muscat's Seeb district. A complex of offices, warehouses, shops and homes transformed the old village of Ruwi in Muttrah into a commercial district. The first five-year development plan in 1976 emphasised infrastructural development of Muscat, which provided new opportunities for trade and tourism in the 1980s–1990s, attracting migrants from around the region. On June 6, 2007, Cyclone Gonu hit Muscat causing extensive damage to property, infrastructure and commercial activity.

Early photographs of the city and harbour, taken in the early 20th century by German explorer and photographer, Hermann Burchardt, are now held at the Ethnological Museum of Berlin.

== Geography and geology ==
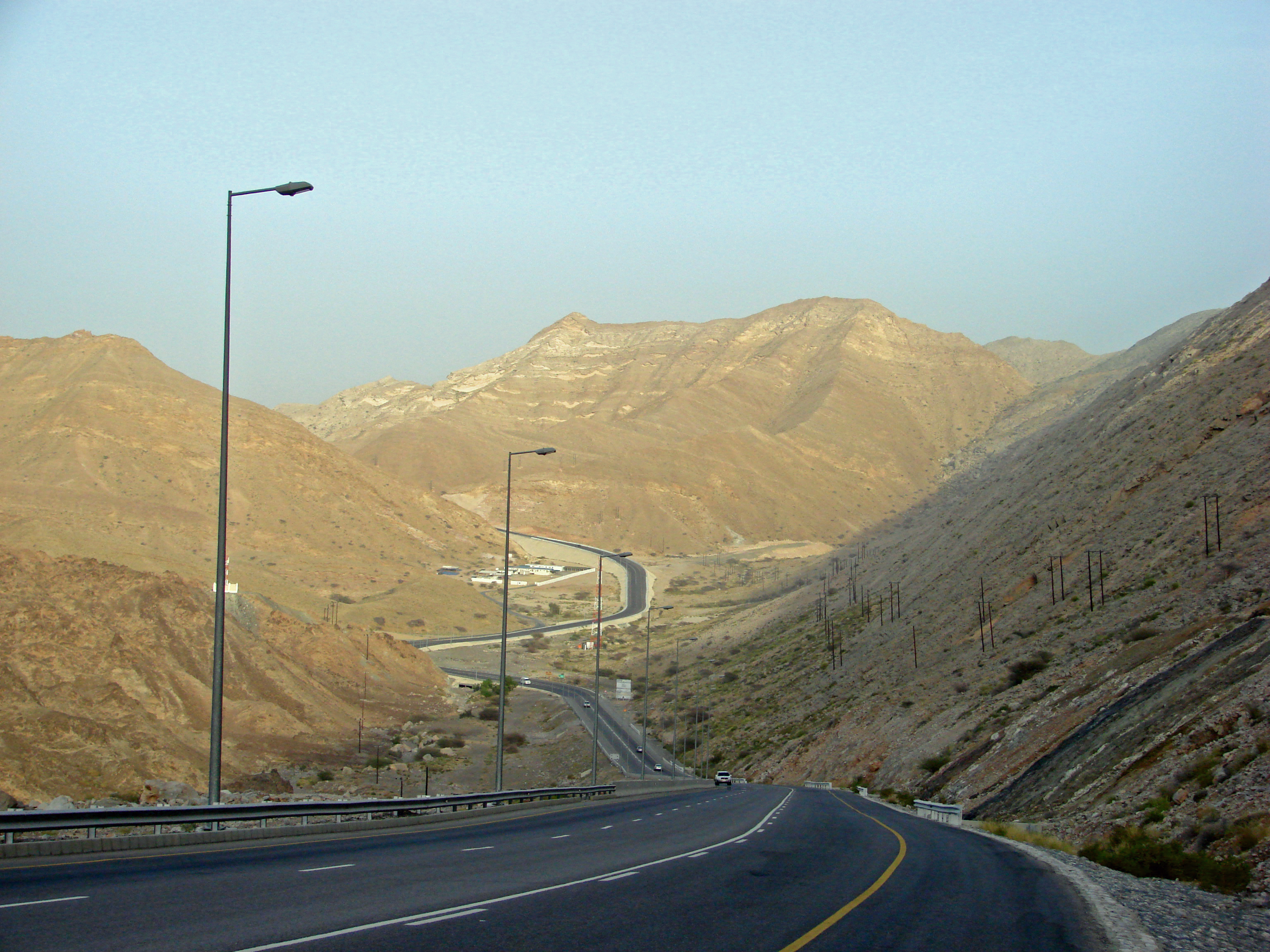
Muscat's rugged terrain, with plutonic Central Hajar Mountains dotting the landscape

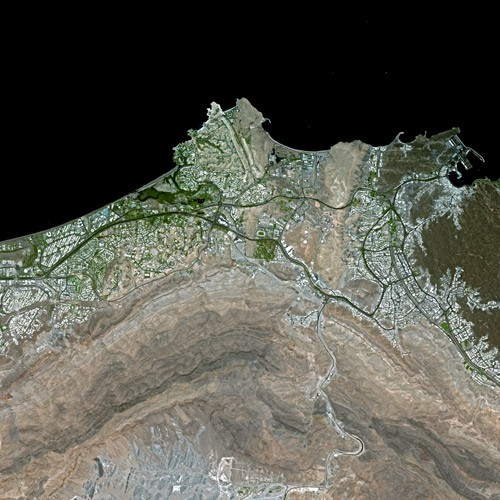
Muscat by SPOT Satellite

Muscat is located in northeast Oman. The Tropic of Cancer passes south of the area. It is bordered to its west by the plains of the Al Batinah Region and to its east by Ash Sharqiyah Region. The interior plains of Ad Dakhiliyah Region border Muscat to the south, while the Gulf of Oman forms the northern and western periphery of the city. The water along the coast of Muscat runs deep, forming two natural harbours, in Muttrah and Muscat. The Central Hajar Mountains run through the northern coastline of the city.

Volcanic rocks, predominantly serpentinite and diorite are apparent in the Muscat area and extend along the Gulf of Oman coast for ten or twelve 16 kilometres (9.9 mi) from the district of Darsait to Yiti. Plutonic rocks constitute the hills and mountains of Muscat and span approximately 30 miles (48 km) from Darsait to Ras Jissah. These igneous rocks consists of serpentinite, greenstone, and basalt, typical of rocks in southeastern regions of the Arabian Peninsula. South of Muscat, the volcanic rock strata are broken up and distorted, rising to a maximum height of 6,000 feet (1,800 m) in Al-Dakhiliyah, a region which includes Jebel Akhdar, the country's highest range. The hills in Muscat are mostly devoid of vegetation but are rich in iron.

The halophytic sabkha type desert vegetation is predominant in Muscat. The Qurum Nature Reserve contains plants such as the Arthrocnemum Macrostachyum and Halopeplis Perfoliata. Coral reefs are common in Muscat. Acropora reefs exist in the sheltered bays of the satellite towns of Jussah and Khairan. Additionally, smaller Porites reef colonies exist in Khairan, which have fused to form a flat-top pavement that is visible at low tide. Crabs and spiny crayfish are found in the waters of the Muscat area, as are sardines and bonito. Glassfish are common in freshwater estuaries, such as the Qurum Nature Reserve.

The Sultan Qaboos Street forms the main artery of Muscat, running west-to-east through the city. The street eventually becomes Al Nahdah Street near Al Wattayah. Several inter-city roads such as Nizwa Road and Al Amrat Road, intersect with Al Sultan Qaboos Road (in Rusail and Ruwi, respectively). Muttrah, with the Muscat Harbour, Corniche, and Mina Qaboos, is located in the north-eastern coastline of the city, adjacent to the Gulf of Oman. Other coastal districts of Muscat include Darsait, Mina Al Fahal, Ras Al Hamar, Al Qurum Heights, Al Khuwair, and Al Seeb. Residential and commercial districts further inland include Al Hamriyah, Al Wadi Al Kabir, Ruwi, Al Wattayah, Madinat Qaboos, Al Azaiba and Al Ghubra.

=== Climate ===
Muscat features a hot, arid climate (Köppen climate classification BWh) with long, sweltering summers and warm winters. Annual rainfall in Muscat is about 10 centimetres or 4 inches, falling mostly from December to April. In general, precipitation is scarce in Muscat, with the months May to November typically receiving only a trace of rainfall. However, in recent years, heavy precipitation events from tropical systems originating in the Arabian Sea have struck the city. Cyclone Gonu in June 2007 and Cyclone Phet in June 2010 affected the city with damaging winds and rainfall amounts exceeding 100 millimetres or 4 inches in just a single day. The climate generally is very hot and also very humid in the summer, with temperatures sometimes reaching as high as 45 °C or 113 °F.

Climate data for Muscat (Muscat International Airport) (1991–2020 normals, extremes 1961–1990)
Month	Jan	Feb	Mar	Apr	May	Jun	Jul	Aug	Sep	Oct	Nov	Dec	Year
Record high °C (°F)	34.6 (94.3)	38.2 (100.8)	41.5 (106.7)	44.9 (112.8)	48.3 (118.9)	48.5 (119.3)	49.1 (120.4)	49.2 (120.6)	47.2 (117.0)	43.6 (110.5)	39.4 (102.9)	37.8 (100.0)	49.2 (120.6)
Mean daily maximum °C (°F)	25.1 (77.2)	26.3 (79.3)	29.4 (84.9)	34.6 (94.3)	39.5 (103.1)	39.4 (102.9)	37.3 (99.1)	35.9 (96.6)	35.5 (95.9)	34.6 (94.3)	29.9 (85.8)	26.6 (79.9)	32.8 (91.1)
Daily mean °C (°F)	21.1 (70.0)	22.2 (72.0)	24.9 (76.8)	29.5 (85.1)	34.2 (93.6)	34.8 (94.6)	33.2 (91.8)	31.6 (88.9)	30.8 (87.4)	29.4 (84.9)	25.7 (78.3)	22.5 (72.5)	28.3 (83.0)
Mean daily minimum °C (°F)	16.7 (62.1)	17.8 (64.0)	20.3 (68.5)	24.7 (76.5)	29.1 (84.4)	30.4 (86.7)	30.0 (86.0)	28.4 (83.1)	27.1 (80.8)	24.7 (76.5)	21.0 (69.8)	17.9 (64.2)	24.0 (75.2)
Record low °C (°F)	1.6 (34.9)	2.3 (36.1)	7.0 (44.6)	10.3 (50.5)	17.2 (63.0)	21.6 (70.9)	23.5 (74.3)	21.3 (70.3)	19.0 (66.2)	14.3 (57.7)	9.4 (48.9)	4.5 (40.1)	1.6 (34.9)
Average precipitation mm (inches)	14.3 (0.56)	6.5 (0.26)	11.5 (0.45)	11.4 (0.45)	2.5 (0.10)	7.0 (0.28)	1.7 (0.07)	0.7 (0.03)	0.1 (0.00)	0.9 (0.04)	6.9 (0.27)	9.8 (0.39)	73.3 (2.9)
Average relative humidity (%)	63	64	58	45	42	49	60	67	63	55	60	65	58
Mean monthly sunshine hours	268.6	244.8	278.3	292.5	347.4	325.7	277.7	278.6	303.9	316.9	291.9	267.0	3,493.3
Source 1: NOAA (humidity and sun 1991–1960)
Source 2: Starlings Roost Weather

== Economy ==
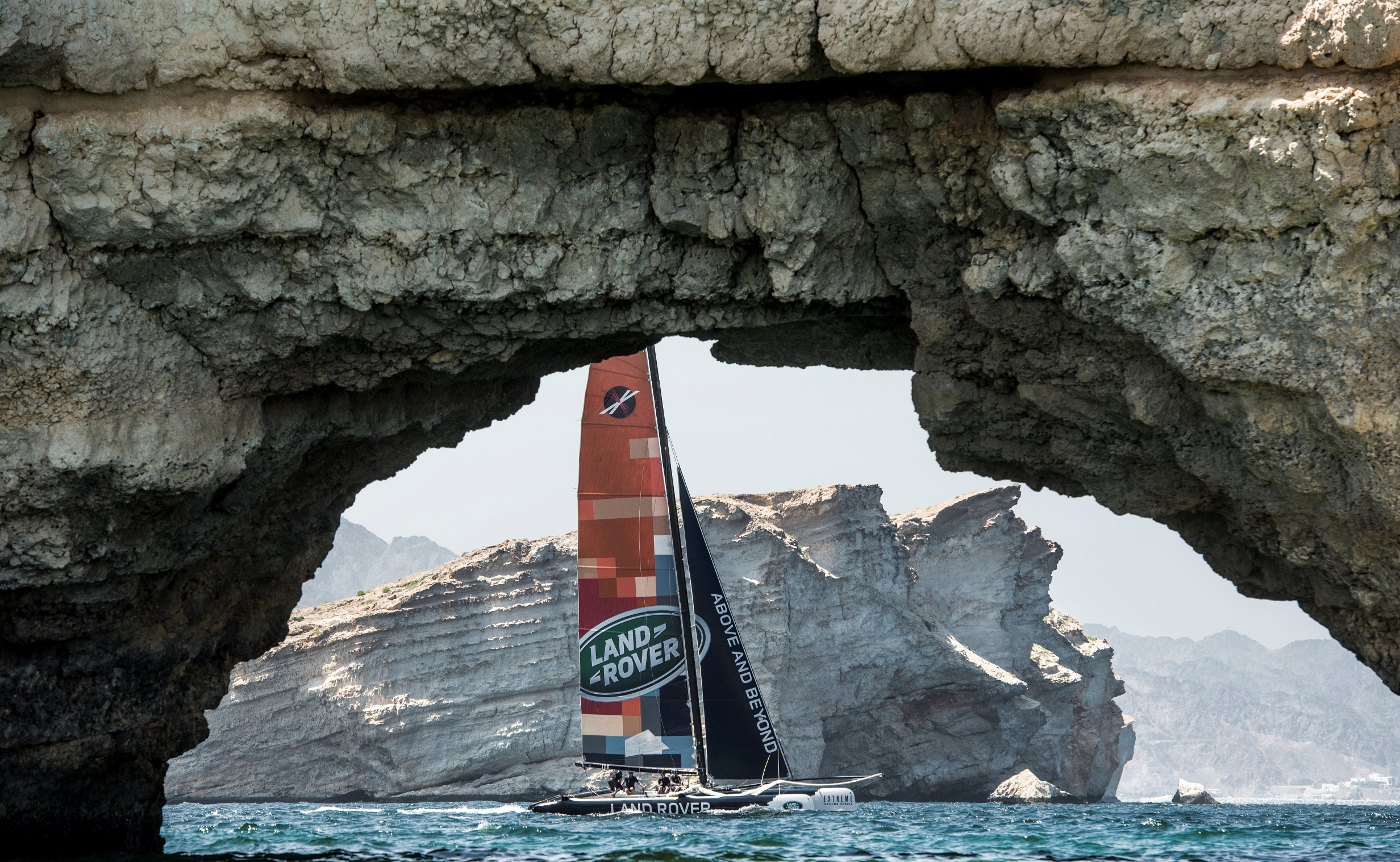
Offshore sailing in Muscat

Muscat's economy, like that of Oman, is dominated by trade. The more traditional exports of the city included dates, mother of pearl, and fish. Many of the souks of Muttrah sell these items and traditional Omani artefacts. Petroleum Development Oman has been central to Muscat's economy since at least 1962 and is the country's second largest employer, after the government. Its major shareholders include Shell, Total, and Partex and its production is estimated to be about 720,000 barrels per day (114,000 m^{3}/d).

The Muscat Securities Market is the principal stock exchange of Oman. It is located in Central Business District of Muscat and it was established in 1988, and has since distinguished itself as a pioneer among its regional peers in terms of transparency and disclosure regulations and requirements.

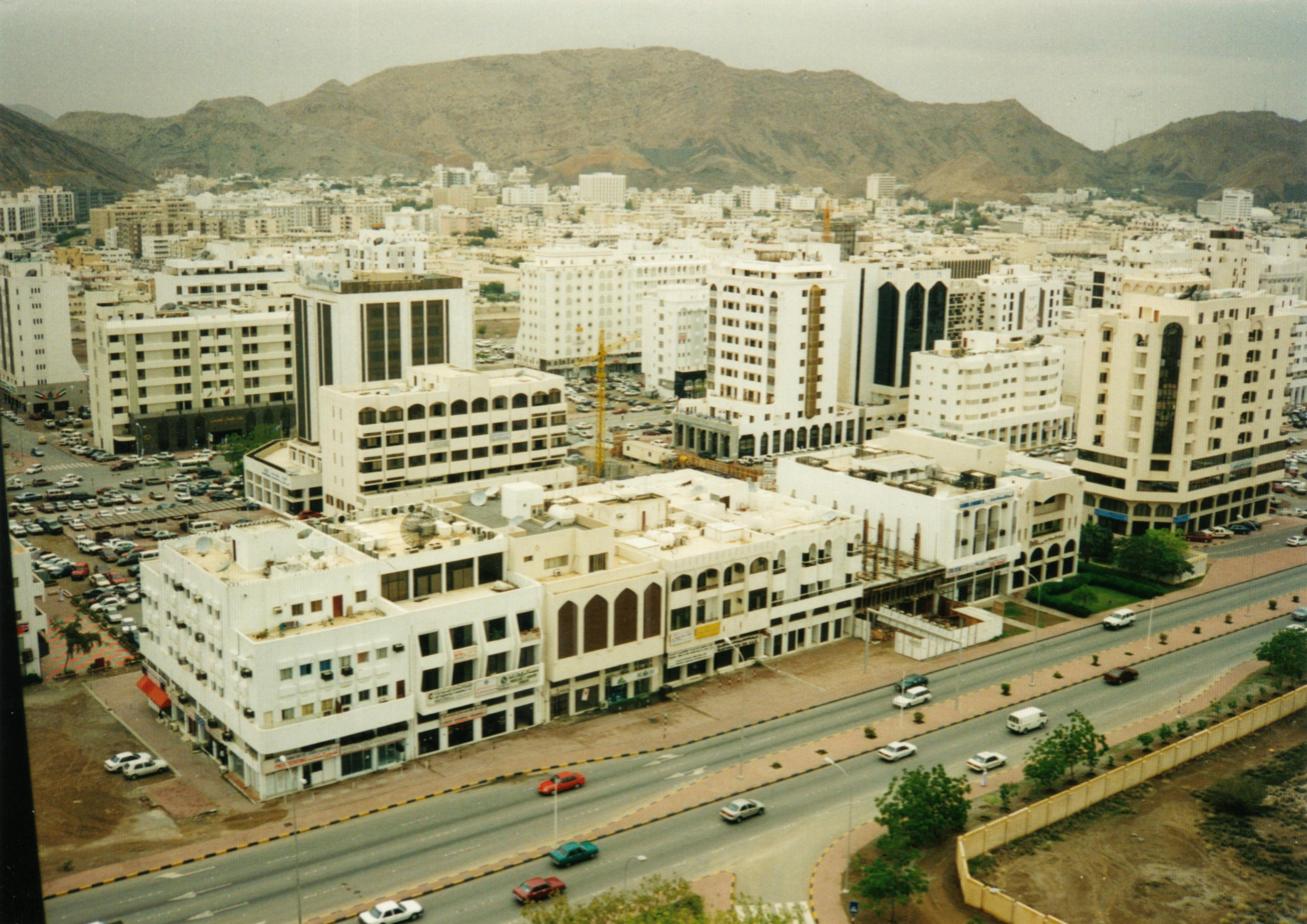
Ruwi, the main business district of Muscat

Mina'a Sultan Qaboos, Muscat's main trading port, is a trading hub between the Persian Gulf, the Indian subcontinent and the Far East with an annual volume of about 1.6 million tons. However, the emergence of the Jebel Ali Free Zone in neighboring Dubai, United Arab Emirates, has made that port the premier maritime trading port of the region with about 44 million tons traded in cargo annually.

Many infrastructural facilities are owned and operated by the government of Oman. Omantel is the major telecommunications organization in Oman and provides local, long-distance and international dialing facilities and operates as the country's only Internet service provider. Recent liberalization of the mobile telephone market has seen the establishment of a second provider, Ooredoo.

Muscat is home to multibillion-dollar conglomerate CK Industries with their headquarters located in Ruwi. Ajman based Amtek Industries also have a couple of offices around the city. The national airline Oman Air has its head office on the grounds of Muscat International Airport. The private Health Care sector of Muscat, Oman has numerous hospitals and clinics.

== Demographics ==
According to the 2003 census conducted by the Oman Ministry of National Economy, the population of Muscat is over 630,000, which included 370,000 males and 260,000 females. Muscat formed the second largest governorate in the country, after Al Batinah, accounting for 27% of the total population of Oman. As of 2003, Omanis constituted 60% of the total population of Muscat, while immigrants accounted for about 40%. The population density of the city was 162.1 per km^{2}.

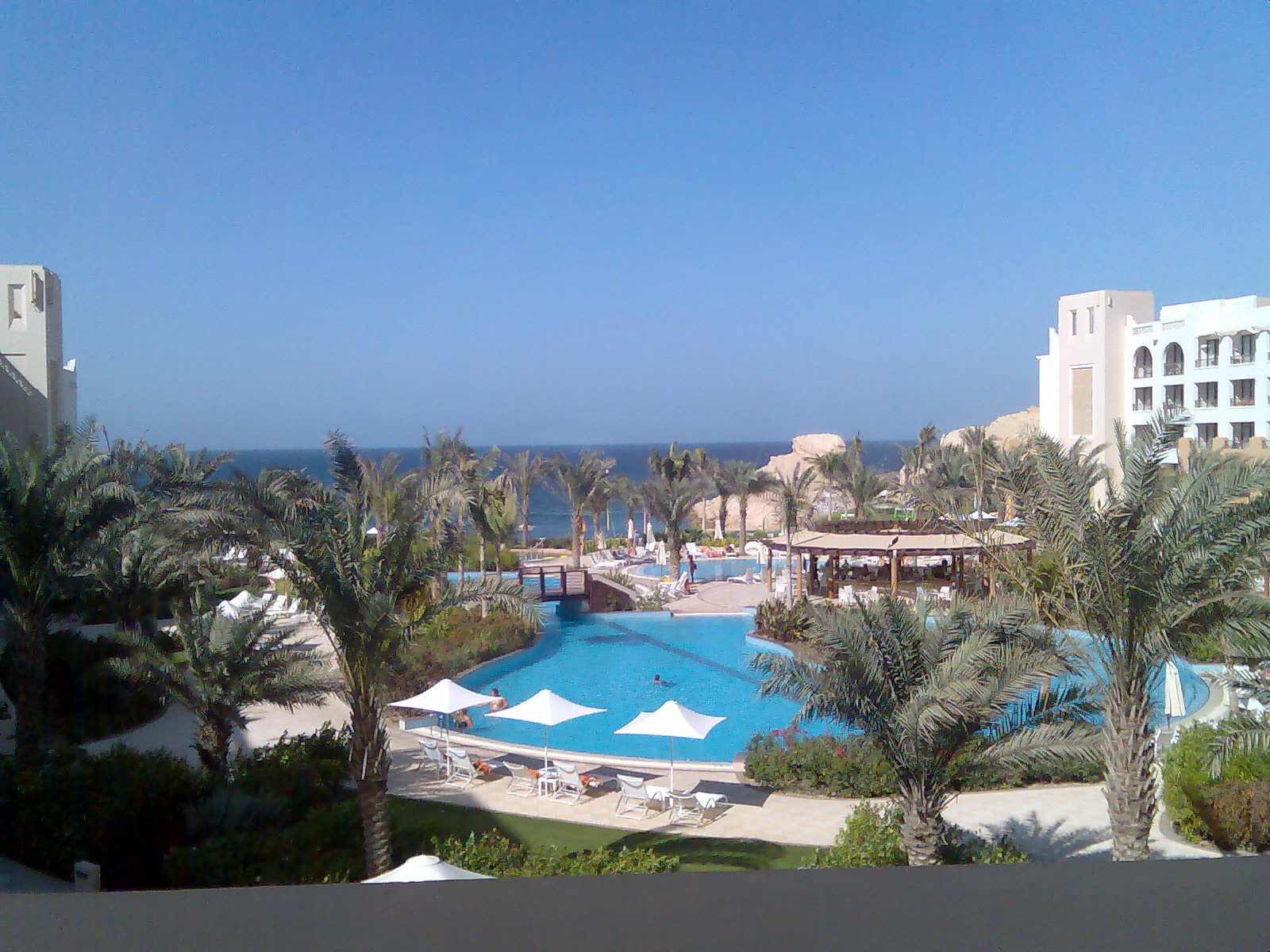
Shangri la in Muscat

The governorate of Muscat comprises six wilayat: Muttrah, Bawshar, Seeb, Al Amrat, Muscat and Qurayyat. Seeb, located in the western section of the governorate, was the most populous (with over 220,000 residents), while Muttrah had the highest number of expatriates (with over 100,000). Approximately 71% of the population was within the 15–64 age group, with the average Omani age being 23 years. About 10% of the population is illiterate, an improvement when compared to the 18% illiteracy rate recorded during the 1993 census. Expatriates accounted for over 60% of the labour force, dominated by males, who accounted for 80% of the city's total labour. A majority of expatriates (34%) was in engineering-related occupations, while most Omanis worked in engineering, clerical, scientific or technical fields. The defense sector was the largest employer for Omanis, while construction, wholesale and retail trade employed the largest number of expatriates.

The ethnic makeup of Muscat has historically been influenced by people not native to the Arabian Peninsula. British Parliamentary papers dating back to the 19th century indicate the presence of a significant Hindu Gujarati merchants in the city. Indeed, four Hindu temples existed in Muscat ca. 1760. Christianity flourished in Oman (Bēṯ Mazūnāyē "land of the Maganites"; a name deriving from its Sumerian designation) from the late 4th century to the 7th century. Missionary activity by the Assyrians of the Church of the East resulted in a significant Christian population living in the region, with a bishop being attested by 424 AD under the Metropolitan of Fars and Arabia. The rise of Islam saw the Syriac and Arabic-speaking Christian population eventually disappear. It is thought to have been brought back in by the Portuguese in 1507. Protestant missionaries established a hospital in Muscat in the 19th century.

Like the rest of Oman, Arabic is the predominant language of the city. In addition, English, Balochi, Sindhi, Swahili and Indian languages such as Bengali, Gujarati, Hindi, Konkani, Malayalam, Marathi, Odia, Tamil, Tulu, Telugu and Urdu are spoken by the residents of Muscat. Islam is the predominant religion in the city, with most followers being Ibadi Muslims. Non-Muslims are allowed to practise their religion, but may not proselytize publicly or distribute religious literature. In 2017 the Sultanate of Oman unveiled the Mushaf Muscat, an interactive calligraphic Quran following a brief from the Omani Ministry of Endowments and Religious Affairs.

== Notable landmarks ==
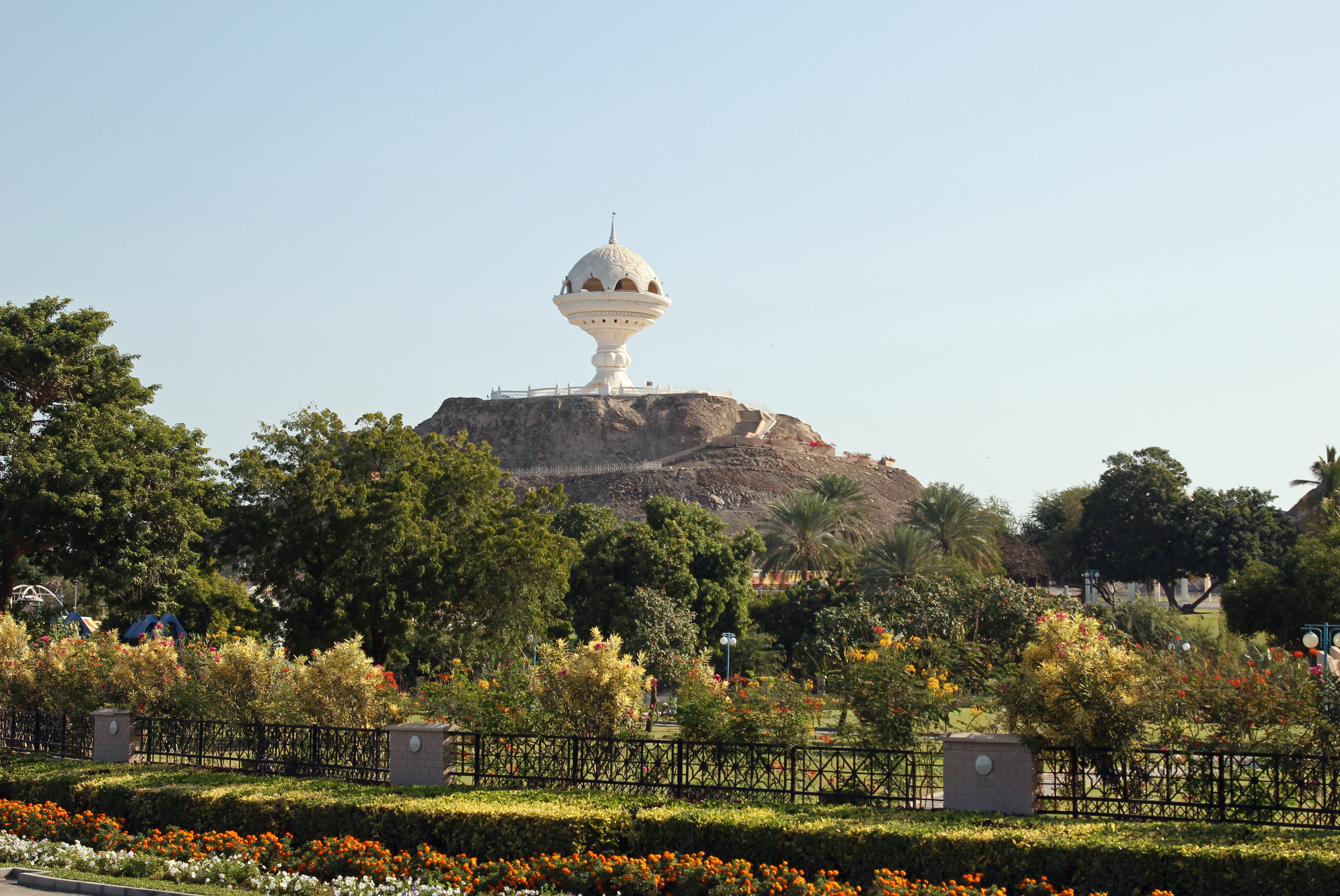
Riyam Park with Incense Burner

The city has numerous mosques including the Sultan Qaboos Grand Mosque, Ruwi Mosque, Saeed bin Taimoor and Zawawi Mosque. A few Shi'ite mosques also exist here. Muscat has a number of museums. These include Museum of Omani Heritage, National Museum of Oman, Oman Children's Museum, Bait Al Zubair, Oman Oil and Gas Exhibition Centre, Omani French Museum, Sultan's Armed Forces Museum and the Omani Aquarium and Marine Science and Fisheries Centre.

The Bait Al Falaj Fort played an important role in Muscat's military history. Recent projects include an opera house which opened on October 14, 2011. One of the most notable new projects is the Oman National Museum. It is expected to be an architectural jewel along with the Sultan Qaboos Grand Mosque. Visitors are also encouraged to visit Old Muscat and the Old Palace. The Al Khuwair Square Flagpole, which was inaugurated on 22 May 2025, is the 13th tallest flagpole in the world, standing at 126 metres into the sky, the equivalent of a 40-storey building. This monumental structure now stands as the highest man-made feature in the country.

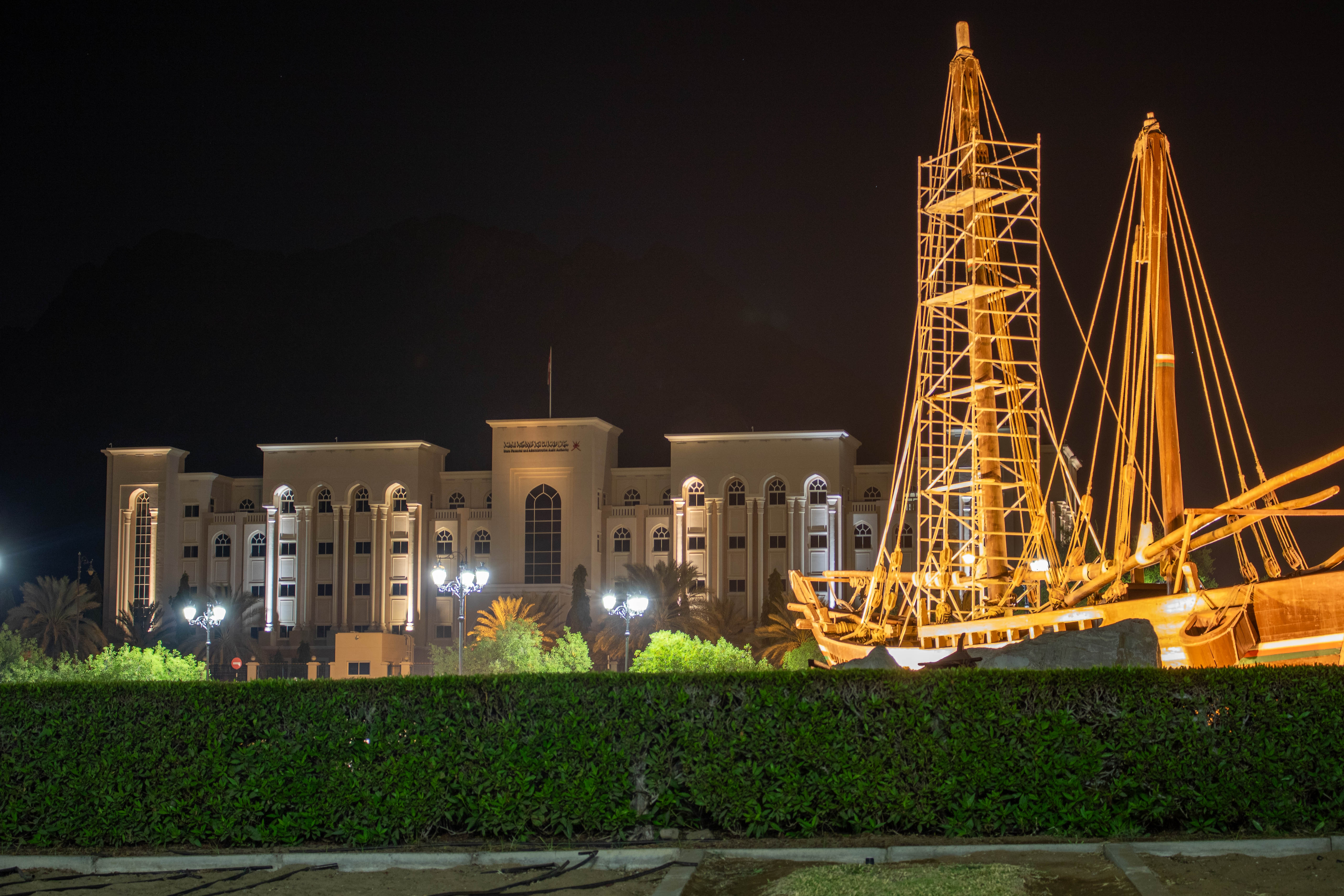
Oman State Audit Institution Building near Al Bustan Palace Roundabout

== Shopping and recreation ==
The main shopping district is situated in Al Qurum Commercial Area. However, shopping malls are found throughout the city. One of the largest malls in Oman is Oman Avenues Mall, located in Ghubra. The fourth largest mall is in Seeb, near the international airport, called City Centre Muscat, housing all major international brands and the largest Carrefour hypermarket. Two new megamalls opened during 2019 and 2020: in the Mabela area of Muscat are Al Araimi Boulevard and Mall of Muscat. The Mall of Muscat is also home to the Oman Aquarium. Mall Of Oman, the largest shopping mall in Oman was opened in Summer 2021 housing over 100+ stores including Snow Oman, Vox Cinemas, an arcade (Magic Planet) and various food chains.

== Transport ==
Waterways

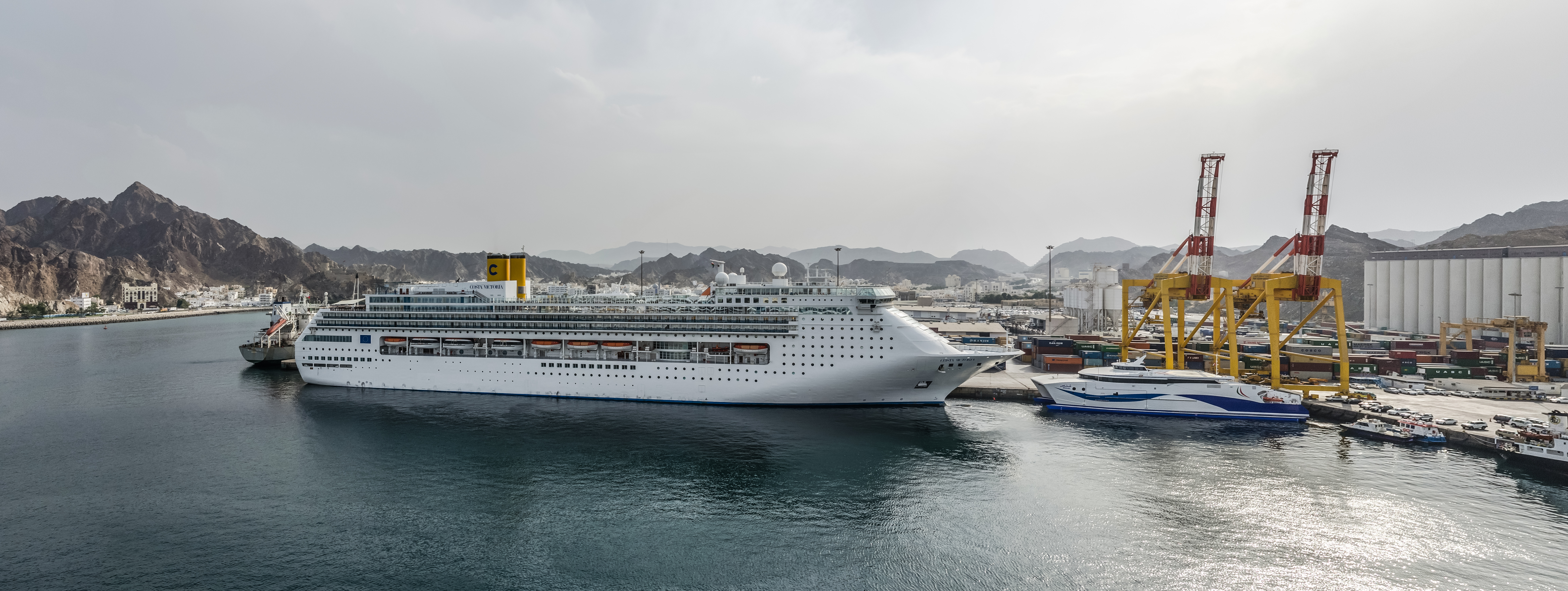
The Port Sultan Qaboos

Port Sultan Qaboos serves as one of the most important ports of Muscat Governorate. Dhows, the traditional boats of the Arabian Peninsula, can be seen in the harbor. This port has been a commercial and financial center of international maritime trade for many centuries.

Airport

The main airport is Muscat International Airport (formerly known as Seeb International Airport) around 25 km (16 mi) from the city's business district of Ruwi and 15 to 20 km from the main residential localities of Al-Khuwair, Madinat Al Sultan Qaboos, Shati Al-Qurm and Al-Qurm. Muscat is the headquarters for the local Oman Air, which flies to several destinations within the Middle East, the Indian Subcontinent, East Africa and Europe.

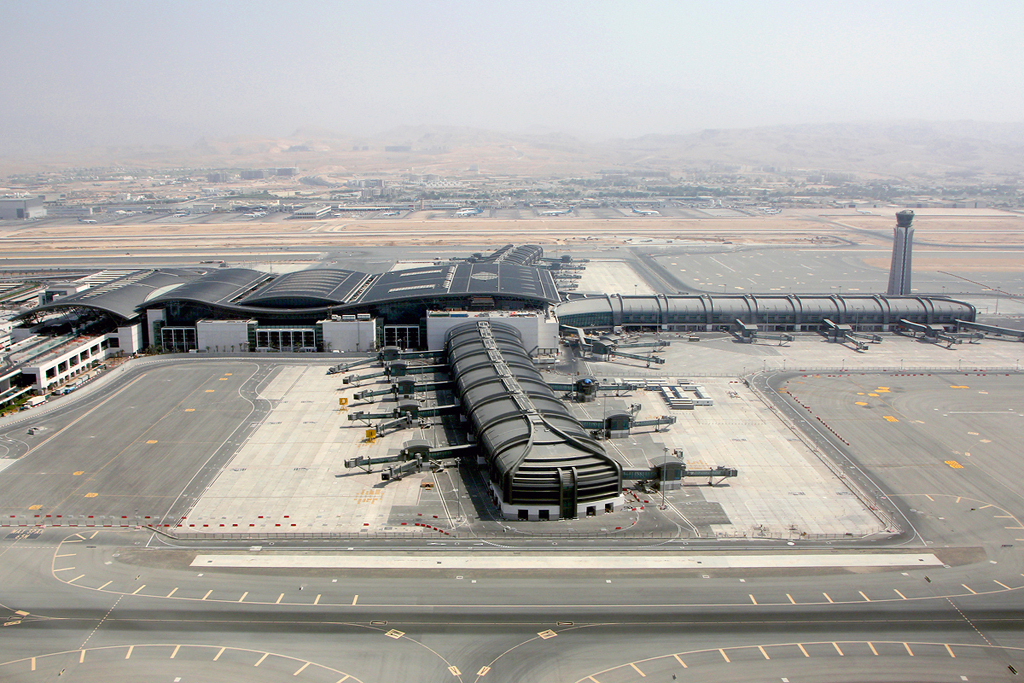
Muscat International Airport

Road transportation

The Muscat area is well serviced by paved roads and dual-carriageway connects most major cities and towns in the country.

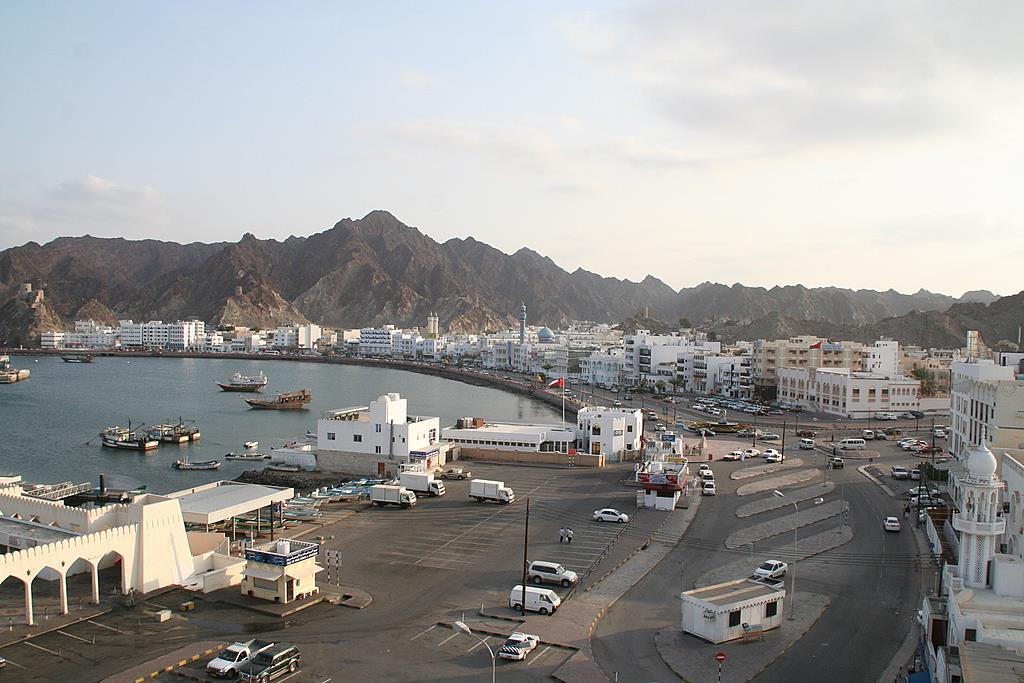
Mutrah

Since November 2015, Public transportation in Muscat has been revamped with a bus network connecting most important parts of the city with a fleet of modern Mwasalat (earlier Oman National Transport Company buses. Mwasalat buses procured from VDL of the Netherlands and MAN of Germany have several hi-tech features, including free Wi-Fi.

- Route 1 (Ruwi-Mabela) serves people travelling major shopping destinations (Oman Avenues Mall, Muscat Grand Mall, Qurum City Centre, Muscat City Centre, Markaz al Bhaja) and Muscat Airport.
- Route 2 (Ruwi-Wadi Kabir) serves the residential and industrial district of Wadi Kabir.
- Route 3 (Ruwi-Wadi Adei) serves the downmarket residential belt of Wadi Adei.
- Route 4 (Ruwi-Mattrah) serves the tourist destination of Muttrah Corniche, Al Alam Palace, Muttrah Fort, National Museum and Port Sultan Qaboos and churches/temples.
- Route 5 (Ruwi-Amerat) serves the rapidly developing Amerat suburb.
- Route 6 (Ruwi-SQU&KOM) serves the student community of Sultan Qaboos University (SQU) and the office commuters of Knowledge Oasis Muscat (KOM).
- Route 7 serves the three major malls in Muscat – Al Araimi Boulevard, Mall of Muscat and Markaz al Bhaja and Muscat City Centre.
- Route 8 serves Al Khuwair and Al Mouj Integrated Complex
- Route 9 serves Ansab and Misfah industrial area.
- Route 10 serves Seeb Souq and Mawelah Vegetable Market.
- Route 12 serves Oman Convention and Exhibition, Ghala areas.
- Route 14 serves Petroleum Development Oman, Qurm Natural Park, Qurm City Centre, Khoula Hospital.
- Routes 1b and 1A are special buses to Muscat International Airport.

Several forms of public transport are popular in Oman. Most popular are the "Baiza" buses, so named for the lower denomination of the Omani rial, the baiza (an adaptation of the Indian lower denomination paisa). These are relatively inexpensive and service all major roadways, as well as a wide and loose network of smaller byways in the greater Muscat metropolitan area, opportunistically dropping off and picking up passengers at any location. Less popular and slightly more expensive are large public buses, coloured red and green, whose service is limited to major roadways and point-to-point travel routes between Oman's major cities and towns. Taxis, also colour-coded orange and white, provide semi-personal transportation in the form of both individual hire and the same opportunistic roadway service as Baiza buses.

Baiza buses and colour-coded orange-and-white taxis are unmetered, after several government initiatives to introduce meters were rejected. The fare is set by way of negotiation, although taxi drivers usually adhere to certain unwritten rules for fares within the city. In many countries, one is advised to negotiate a fare with the driver before getting into a taxi. However, in Oman, asking for the fare beforehand often demonstrates a passenger's newness and unfamiliarity with the area. One should always find out the normally accepted fare for one's journey from one's hotel or host before looking for a taxi. Taxis also generally take passengers to locations out of the city, including Sohar, Buraimi and Dubai.

== Culture ==
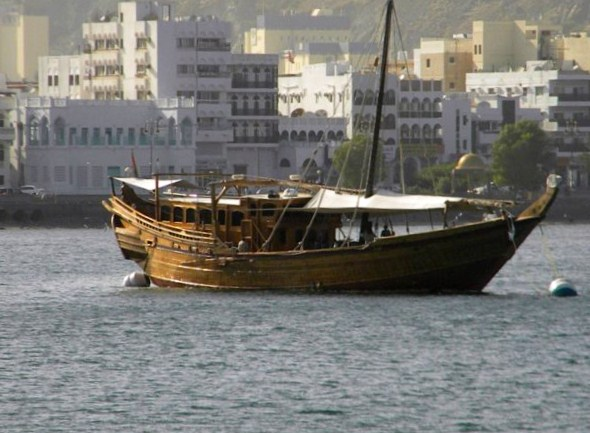
The traditional Dhow, an enduring symbol of Oman

Outwardly, Oman shares many of the cultural characteristics of its Arab neighbours, particularly those in the Gulf Cooperation Council. Despite these similarities, important factors make Oman unique in the Middle East. These result as much from geography and history as from culture and economics. The relatively recent and artificial nature of the state of Oman makes it difficult to describe a national culture; however, sufficient cultural heterogeneity exists within its national boundaries to make Oman distinct from other Arab States of the Persian Gulf. Oman's cultural diversity is greater than that of its Arab neighbours, given its historical expansion to the Swahili Coast and the Indian Ocean.

Oman has a long tradition of shipbuilding, as maritime travel played a major role in the Omanis' ability to stay in contact with the civilisations of the ancient world. Sur was one of the most famous shipbuilding cities of the Indian Ocean. The Al Ghanja ship takes one whole year to build. Other types of Omani ship include As Sunbouq and Al Badan.

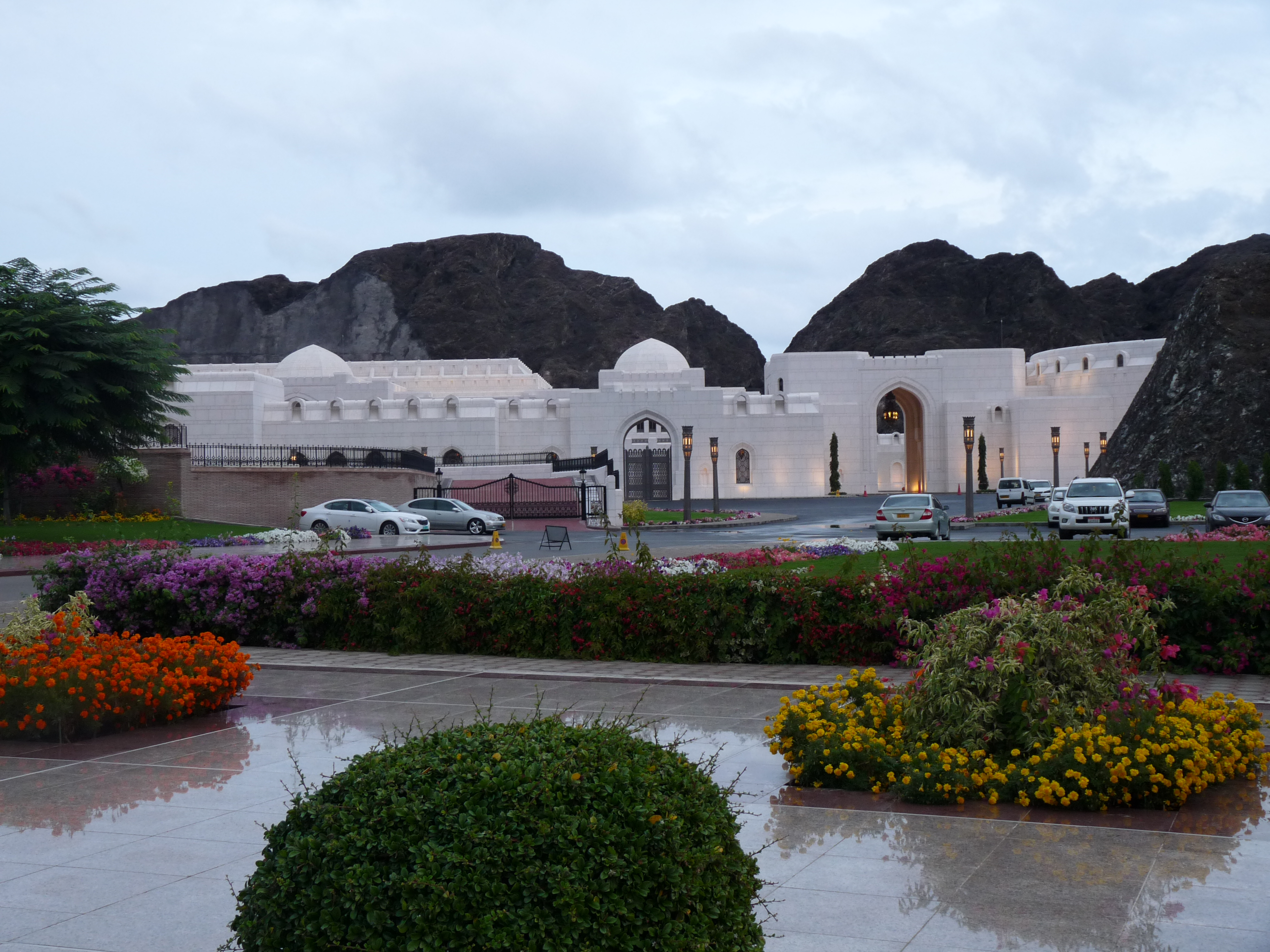
Oman Council building in Muscat

In March 2016, archaeologists working off Al-Hallaniyah Island identified a shipwreck believed to be that of the Esmeralda from Vasco da Gama's 1502–1503 fleet. The wreck was initially discovered in 1998. Later underwater excavations took place between 2013 and 2015 through a partnership between the Oman Ministry of Heritage and Culture and Blue Water Recoveries Ltd., a shipwreck recovery company. The vessel was identified through such artifacts as a "Portuguese coin minted for trade with India (one of only two coins of this type known to exist) and stone cannonballs engraved with what appear to be the initials of Vincente Sodré, da Gama's maternal uncle and the commander of the Esmeralda".

== Notable people ==
- Mohammed Al Barwani (born 1952), billionaire and founder of MB Holding
- Avicii (1989–2018), Swedish music producer and DJ, died in Muscat Hills
- Mahesh Bhupathi (born 1974), Indian tennis player. He studied at the Indian School, Muscat.
- Sarah-Jane Dias (born 1974), Indian actress. She studied at the Indian School, Muscat.
- Isla Fisher (born 1976), Australian actress, born to Scottish parents and lived in Australia
- Tate McRae (born 2003), Canadian singer-songwriter, studied at The American International School Muscat
- Ali Al-Habsi (born 1981), professional footballer, captain of the Oman national and goalkeeper for Saudi club Al Hilal
- Amad Al-Hosni (born 1984), professional footballer
- Ahmad Al Harthy (born 1981), racecar driver
- Fatma Al-Nabhani (born 1991), tennis player
- Shamaa Mohammed (1958–2022), television actress
- Ali bin Masoud al Sunaidy (born 1964), former Omani Minister of Commerce and Industry
- Sneha Ullal (born 1987), Indian Bollywood Actress. She studied at the Indian School, Muscat.
- Nitya Vidyasagar (born 1985), American actress
- Al Faisal Al Zubair (born 1998), racecar driver
- Hamed Al-Wahaibi (born 1968), rally driver
- Muzna Al Musafer (born 1987), first female film director in Oman.

== See also ==
- Old Muscat
- Sultan Haitham City

== Bibliography ==
- Barth, Hans-Jörg; Benno Böer (2002). Sabkha Ecosystems: The Arabian Peninsula and Adjacent Countries. Springer. ISBN 978-1-4020-0504-6.
- Fahlbusch, Erwin; Geoffrey William Bromiley; David B. Barrett (1999). The Encyclopedia of Christianity. Wm. B. Eerdmans Publishing. ISBN 978-0-8028-2415-8.
- Forster, Charles, The Historical Geography of Arabia: Or, The Patriarchal Evidences of Revealed Religion: a Memoir, Duncan and Malcolm, 1844, Vol.1
- Forster, Charles, The Historical Geography of Arabia: Or, The Patriarchal Evidences of Revealed Religion: a Memoir, Duncan and Malcolm, 1844, Vol.2
- Ghazanfar, Shahina A.; Fisher, Martin (1998). Vegetation of the Arabian Peninsula. Springer. ISBN 978-0-7923-5015-6.
- Hailman, John R. (2006). Thomas Jefferson on Wine. Univ. Press of Mississippi. ISBN 978-1-57806-841-8.
- Kechichian, Joseph A. (1995). Oman and the World: The Emergence of an Independent Foreign Policy. Great Britain: RAND Corporation. ISBN 978-0-8330-2332-2.
- Long, David E.; Reich, Bernard; Gasiorowski, Mark (2007). The Government and Politics of the Middle East and North Africa. Westview Press. ISBN 978-0-8133-4361-7.
- Miles, Samuel Barrett; Robin Bidwell. The Countries and Tribes of the Persian Gulf. Garnet & Ithaca Press.
- Peterson, J. E. (2007). "Chronology". Historical Muscat. Brill. p. 117+. ISBN 978-90-04-15266-3.
- Phillips, Wendell (1966). Unknown Oman. D. McKay Co. p. 4.
- Potter, Lawrence; Sick, Gary (2002). Security in the Persian Gulf. Macmillan. ISBN 978-0-312-23950-3.
- Rice, Michael (1994). The Archeology of the Arabian Gulf. Routledge. ISBN 978-0-415-03268-1.
- Room, Adrian (2003). Placenames of the World: Origins and Meanings of the Names for Over 5000 Natural Features, Countries, Capitals, Territories, Cities and Historic Sites. McFarland. ISBN 978-0-7864-1814-5.
- Salm, Rodney V.; Rolf A.C. Jensen; Vassili Papastavrou (1993). Marine Fauna of Oman. IUCN. ISBN 978-2-8317-0180-6.
