= 2024 state visits by Mohamed bin Zayed Al Nahyan to South Korea and China =

2024 visit by the President of the United Arab Emirates

State visit by Sheikh Mohamed to South Korea and China
- Venue: Seoul and Beijing
- Organised by: Government of the United Arab Emirates; Government of South Korea; Government of China

From May 28 to May 31, 2024, the President of the United Arab Emirates Sheikh Mohamed bin Zayed Al Nahyan (MBZ) visited South Korea and China for the first time as UAE Head of State.

== Background ==
In 2018, President of South Korea Moon Jae-in visited the United Arab Emirates (UAE), met with Crown Prince of Abu Dhabi Mohammed bin Zayed Al-Nahyan on March 25. During the summit, the two leaders agreed to upgrade the South Korea-UAE strategic relationship into a special strategic partnership.” Both leaders expect the talks to deepen their strategic partnership and enhance trade, science and technology, defense, industrial and economic exchanges.

The high-level visits about China and UAE, including President Xi Jinping's visit to the UAE in 2018 and Sheikh Mohamed's visit to China in 2019, have significantly bolstered the China-UAE strategic partnership, ushering in a new era of collaboration.

== South Korea ==
On May 28, 2024, the President of the United Arab Emirates Mohamed bin Zayed Al Nahyan paid a state visit to South Korea at the invitation of President Yoon Suk Yeol. This is the first time a UAE president has visited Korea. On the same day, Mr. and Mrs. Al Nahyan took a walk around the Furong Pond area of Changdeokgung Palace, watched a traditional performance, and held a tea party.

At the summit meeting held on May 29, the two countries reviewed the $30 billion (about 40 trillion won) scale of investment Korea has committed to the UAE by 2023 and discussed additional areas of cooperation between the two countries. The two countries discussed four areas: traditional and clean energy, peaceful atomic energy, economy and investment, and defense and defense technology. They signed a Comprehensive Economic Partnership Agreement (CEPA), an accord similar to a free trade agreement stipulating broader bilateral economic cooperation in sectors like services trade, economy and investment. Tariffs on more than 90% of imports between the two countries will be eliminated in the next ten years.

In the afternoon, entrepreneurs including Samsung Electronics Chairman Lee Jae-yong, SK Group Chairman Choi Tae-won, Hyundai Motor Group Chairman Jeong Eui-seon, Hanwha Group Vice Chairman Kim Dong-gwan, HD Hyundai Vice Chairman Jeong Ki-seon and GS Group Chairman Heo Tae-soo, among other chief executives, held a seminar for about one hour with Mohammad at Lotte Hotel in Jung-gu, Seoul.

== China ==
On the morning of May 30, President Mohammed and President Xi Jinping attended the opening ceremony of the 10th Ministerial Meeting of the China–Arab States Cooperation Forum.

In the afternoon, President Xi Jinping held talks at the Great Hall of the People in Beijing with President Mohammed. The President Mohammed expressed his great pleasure at visiting his second home China again and was honoured to attend the opening ceremony of the tenth ministerial meeting of the China–Arab States Cooperation Forum. The President Xi appreciated that China-UAE relations have maintained a good momentum of development, setting a model for China-Arab countries relations in the new era.

They discussed bilateral relations and opportunities to enhance cooperation within the framework of the Comprehensive Strategic Partnership between the two nations. The two countries signed a number of bilateral cooperation documents on investment, building the "Belt and Road", science and technology, peaceful use of nuclear energy, Chinese language education, culture and tourism. On the same day, the Chairman of the Standing Committee of the National People's Congress (NPC) Zhao Leji met with President Mohammed in Beijing.

On the morning of May 31, President Mohammed went to Tiananmen Square to lay a wreath at the People's Heroes Monument. On the same morning, Premier Li Qiang met with UAE President Mohammed at Diaoyutai State Guesthouse.

== See also ==
- Foreign relations of the United Arab Emirates
- South Korea–United Arab Emirates relations
- China–United Arab Emirates relations
- China–Arab States Cooperation Forum
- 2024 state visit by Sisi to China
