= List of ambassadors of the United Arab Emirates to China =

Ambassador of United Arab Emirates to the People's Republic of China
- Coat of Arms of the UAE
- Incumbent; Hussain bin Ibrahim Al Hammadi since May 20, 2023
- Ministry of Foreign Affairs
- Style: His Excellency
- Inaugural holder: H.E. Ismaeel Obaid Yousef Obaid Al Ali
- Formation: 1991

The Emirati ambassador in Beijing is the official representative of the Government in Abu Dhabi to the Government of the People's Republic of China.

== List of representatives ==
Diplomatic accreditation	Ambassador	Arabic / Chinese	Observations	Emirati president	Chinese premier	Term end
May 6, 1991	Ismaeel Obaid Yousef Obaid Al Ali	Chinese: 伊斯梅尔·尤素夫·奥贝德	Credentials presented on May 9, 1991.	Zayed bin Sultan Al Nahyan	Li Peng	September 1999
March 2000	Juma Rashed Jassim	Chinese: 朱马·拉希德·贾西姆	Credentials presented on March 17, 2000.	Zayed bin Sultan Al Nahyan	Li Peng	October 2004
January 1, 2005	Mohammed Rashed Alboot	Chinese: 穆罕默德·拉希德·布特	Credentials presented on January 5, 2005.	Maktoum bin Rashid Al Maktoum	Zhu Rongji	January 2010
February 2010	Omar Ahmad Adi Al Bitar	Chinese: 奥马尔·艾哈迈德·白伊塔尔	Credentials presented on March 19, 2010.	Khalifa bin Zayed Al Nahyan	Wen Jiabao	2016
October 16, 2017	Ali Al Dhaheri	Chinese: 阿里·扎希里	Credentials presented on December 5, 2017.	Khalifa bin Zayed Al Nahyan	Wen Jiabao	May 2023
May 20, 2023	Hussain bin Ibrahim Al Hammadi	Chinese: 侯赛因·哈麦迪	Credentials presented on May 29, 2023.	Mohamed bin Zayed Al Nahyan	Li Keqiang	Incumbent

== See also ==
- China–United Arab Emirates relations
- List of ambassadors of China to the United Arab Emirates
