= Chinese people in the United Arab Emirates =

Total population
- 370,000

Regions with significant populations
- Abu Dhabi · Dubai

Languages
- Mandarin · Cantonese · English · Arabic

There are about 370,000 Chinese people in the United Arab Emirates (UAE) as of 2025, according to the Chinese Ambassador to the UAE Zhang Yiming.

Many Chinese expatriates hail from the Wenzhou region; they are mostly businessmen and merchants who run hundreds of commodity shops through the Emirates. Chinese culture in the Emirates has a sizeable presence; there are many Chinese restaurants in Dubai.

== History ==
There were an estimated 7,000 Chinese nationals living in the UAE in 2000 and about 400,000 in 2022 according to the Chinese ambassador. In 2025 he estimated that number at 370,000. According to the Emirates News Agency there were more than 300,000 Chinese people in the UAE as of 2025.

== Dragon Mart ==
The Chinese-themed Dragon Mart is a set of two adjacent shopping malls in the China cluster of Dubai International City, a suburb of Dubai. It is 1.2 kilometre long and is the largest Chinese retail trading hub outside mainland China. It includes the largest concentration of Chinese businesses in the UAE.

== See also ==
- China–United Arab Emirates relations
- Expatriates in the United Arab Emirates
- Chinese diaspora
