= Foreign relations of the United Arab Emirates =

The diplomatic foreign relations of the United Arab Emirates are conducted by the Ministry of Foreign Affairs and International Cooperation.

The United Arab Emirates has broad diplomatic and commercial relations with most countries of the world. Until its departure in 2026, the UAE played a significant role in OPEC, and remains one of the founding members of the Gulf Cooperation Council (GCC). The United Arab Emirates is a member of the United Nations and several of its specialized agencies, as well as the World Bank, IMF, Arab League, Organisation of Islamic Cooperation (OIC), and the Non-Aligned Movement. Also, it is an observer in the Organisation Internationale de la Francophonie. Most countries have diplomatic missions in the capital Abu Dhabi with most consulates being in United Arab Emirates's largest and most populated city, Dubai.

== Multilateral relations ==
UAE has joined the United Nations and the Arab League and has established diplomatic relations with more than 60 countries, including China, Japan, South Korea, Pakistan, Russia, India, Nepal, United States, and most Western European countries. It has played a moderate role within the Organization of Petroleum Exporting Countries (OPEC), the Organization of Arab Petroleum Exporting Countries (OAPEC), the United Nations, and the Gulf Cooperation Council (GCC).

The UAE believes that the Arab League needs to be restructured to become a viable institution, and would like to increase the strength and interoperability of the GCC defense forces.

The UAE is a member of the following international organizations: UN and several of its specialized agencies (ICAO, ILO, UPU, WHO, WIPO); World Bank, IMF, Arab League, Organisation of Islamic Cooperation (OIC), OPEC, Organization of Petroleum Exporting Countries, and the Non-Aligned Movement.

In October 2010, the UAE was granted observer status at the Organisation Internationale de la Francophonie.

As a result of the foreign policy of the UAE, the Emirati passport became the largest individual climber in Henley & Partners Passport Index in 2018 over the past decade, increasing its global rank by 28 places. According to the Henley Passport Index, as of 28 March 2019, Emirati citizens had visa-free or visa on arrival access to 165 countries and territories, ranking the Emirati passport 21st in the world in terms of travel freedom.

In July 2024, The UAE and Japan signed multiple agreements to enhance business ties, including a $3 billion green financing deal and cooperation on energy reserves. Bilateral trade reached $47.4 billion in 2023, with the UAE as Japan's top GCC trading partner and a major oil supplier.

In January 2025, the UAE condemned the 2025 Point Triple attack on Benin.

On 22 September 2026, foreign ministers from India, France, and the United Arab Emirates met during the 81st United Nations General Assembly in New York. The meeting was led by Indian Foreign Minister S. Jaishankar, French Foreign Minister Jean-Noël Barrot, and UAE Foreign Minister Sheikh Abdullah bin Zayed Al Nahyan. The ministers discussed joint projects in space, artificial intelligence, and culture, as well as political developments in West Asia.

== Diplomatic relations ==
List of countries which the United Arab Emirates maintains diplomatic relations with:

#	Country	Date
1	United Kingdom	6 December 1971
2	Belgium	8 December 1971
3	Jordan	8 December 1971
—	Sudan (suspended)	December 1971
4	Bahrain	1971
5	Iraq	1971
6	Italy	1971
7	France	5 January 1972
8	India	6 January 1972
9	Lebanon	8 January 1972
10	Pakistan	13 January 1972
11	Syria	19 January 1972
12	Kuwait	8 March 1972
13	United States	20 March 1972
14	Japan	4 May 1972
15	Netherlands	6 May 1972
16	Germany	17 May 1972
17	Libya	24 May 1972
18	Tunisia	14 June 1972
19	Morocco	14 July 1972
20	Egypt	26 October 1972
21	Iran	28 October 1972
22	Spain	10 November 1972
23	Somalia	29 November 1972
24	Sweden	1972
25	Tanzania	8 January 1973
26	Mauritania	16 March 1973
27	Turkey	21 March 1973
28	Oman	1 April 1973
29	Afghanistan	6 April 1973
30	Chad	7 April 1973
31	Yemen	23 June 1973
32	Norway	4 July 1973
—	Algeria (suspended)	6 July 1973
33	Senegal	23 July 1973
34	Switzerland	12 September 1973
35	Malta	20 November 1973
36	Gabon	6 January 1974
37	Canada	2 February 1974
38	Argentina	26 February 1974
39	Burundi	February 1974
40	Bangladesh	9 March 1974
41	Austria	10 March 1974
42	Brazil	10 June 1974
43	Philippines	19 August 1974
44	Saudi Arabia	21 August 1974
45	Ireland	8 October 1974
46	Zambia	29 November 1974
47	Denmark	18 January 1975
48	Finland	21 February 1975
49	Cameroon	24 February 1975
50	Australia	10 March 1975
51	Greece	31 May 1975
52	Ecuador	9 June 1975
53	Venezuela	18 June 1975
54	Lesotho	8 July 1975
55	Gambia	9 July 1975
56	Niger	9 July 1975
57	Mexico	12 September 1975
58	Thailand	12 December 1975
59	Grenada	1975
60	Qatar	1975
61	Colombia	1 January 1976
62	Mauritius	4 January 1976
63	Indonesia	30 April 1976
64	Portugal	20 June 1976
65	Nepal	22 January 1977
66	Comoros	2 June 1977
67	Burkina Faso	16 January 1978
68	Maldives	15 March 1978
69	Chile	23 June 1978
70	Sri Lanka	19 July 1979
71	Uruguay	8 April 1980
72	Luxembourg	6 May 1980
73	South Korea	18 June 1980
74	Mali	18 August 1981
75	Ghana	25 August 1981
76	Djibouti	26 December 1981
77	Nigeria	20 January 1982
78	Kenya	5 June 1982
79	Sierra Leone	5 October 1982
80	Seychelles	18 December 1982
81	Malaysia	23 June 1983
82	China	1 November 1984
83	Singapore	15 May 1985
84	New Zealand	20 May 1985
85	Russia	13 November 1985
86	Benin	5 January 1986
87	Peru	17 June 1986
88	Bolivia	1 December 1986
89	Czech Republic	7 June 1988
—	State of Palestine	5 January 1989
90	Romania	1 August 1989
91	Hungary	2 August 1989
92	Poland	4 September 1989
93	Nicaragua	1 August 1991
94	Bulgaria	19 October 1991
95	Belize	10 December 1991
96	Brunei	28 May 1992
97	Albania	1 June 1992
98	Croatia	23 June 1992
99	Azerbaijan	1 September 1992
100	Kazakhstan	1 October 1992
101	Slovenia	15 October 1992
102	Ukraine	15 October 1992
103	Lithuania	16 October 1992
104	Belarus	20 October 1992
105	Georgia	20 October 1992
106	Uzbekistan	25 October 1992
107	Guatemala	15 December 1992
108	Slovakia	3 January 1993
109	Panama	9 March 1993
110	Ethiopia	5 May 1993
111	Eritrea	28 June 1993
112	Bosnia and Herzegovina	1 August 1993
113	Vietnam	1 August 1993
114	South Africa	17 May 1994
115	Ivory Coast	30 May 1994
116	Cambodia	21 October 1994
117	Guyana	6 February 1995
118	Guinea	2 June 1995
119	Latvia	18 September 1995
120	Turkmenistan	10 October 1995
121	Tajikistan	18 December 1995
122	Moldova	21 December 1995
123	Rwanda	1995
124	Barbados	8 January 1996
125	Honduras	26 February 1996
126	Mongolia	1 April 1996
127	Mozambique	3 April 1996
128	North Macedonia	27 May 1996
129	Malawi	12 June 1996
130	Zimbabwe	24 June 1996
131	Namibia	22 July 1996
132	Kyrgyzstan	1 August 1996
133	Laos	15 October 1996
134	São Tomé and Príncipe	24 October 1997
135	Angola	11 December 1997
136	Armenia	25 June 1998
137	Suriname	7 October 1999
138	Cuba	18 March 2002
139	Iceland	17 September 2003
140	Eswatini	2 November 2005
141	Estonia	28 March 2006
142	Botswana	28 April 2006
143	Cape Verde	July 2006
144	El Salvador	15 March 2007
145	Serbia	21 March 2007
146	Nauru	27 March 2007
147	Antigua and Barbuda	4 May 2007
148	Republic of the Congo	21 May 2007
—	Holy See	30 May 2007
149	Cyprus	6 June 2007
150	Paraguay	13 July 2007
151	Tonga	13 July 2007
—	North Korea (suspended)	17 September 2007
152	Togo	6 December 2007
153	Uganda	2007
154	Montenegro	4 April 2008
155	Andorra	23 September 2008
156	Dominican Republic	12 November 2008
157	San Marino	28 January 2009
158	Saint Vincent and the Grenadines	20 February 2009
159	Liberia	6 May 2009
160	Central African Republic	22 May 2009
161	Vanuatu	23 June 2009
162	Monaco	9 October 2009
163	Palau	16 October 2009
164	Haiti	21 October 2009
165	Liechtenstein	22 October 2009
166	Timor-Leste	13 November 2009
167	Costa Rica	11 March 2010
168	Fiji	17 March 2010
169	Tuvalu	29 March 2010
—	Kosovo	27 April 2010
170	Solomon Islands	29 April 2010
171	Samoa	11 May 2010
172	Marshall Islands	3 June 2010
173	Saint Kitts and Nevis	16 June 2010
174	Saint Lucia	29 November 2010
175	Jamaica	4 March 2011
176	Bahamas	2 May 2011
177	Bhutan	13 September 2012
178	Dominica	17 December 2014
179	South Sudan	23 June 2016
180	Federated States of Micronesia	8 September 2016
181	Madagascar	22 September 2016
182	Papua New Guinea	22 March 2017
183	Democratic Republic of the Congo	1 November 2017
—	Cook Islands	5 August 2018
184	Guinea-Bissau	28 June 2019
185	Equatorial Guinea	13 July 2019
186	Israel	15 September 2020
187	Myanmar	9 November 2020
188	Trinidad and Tobago	Unknown

== Africa ==
Country	Formal Relations Began	Notes
Algeria	6 July 1973 (Diplomatic severed 10 September 2026)	See Algeria–United Arab Emirates relations Both countries established diplomatic relations on 6 July 1973 when UAE officials opened an embassy in Algiers: Algeria has an embassy in Abu Dhabi.; The United Arab Emirates has an embassy in Algiers.
Egypt	10 January 1972, severed diplomatic relations from 25 April 1979, Restored 11 November 1987	See Egypt–United Arab Emirates relations Both countries established diplomatic relations on 10 January 1972 Since the establishment of the UAE in 1971, Egypt and the United Arab Emirates relations were always at a good level and developing at an unprecedented rate. The bond of friendship between the leaders of both countries has reflected on the growing political, economic and cultural ties between them, as a result, UAE ranks first among Arab and foreign countries investing in Egypt. The UAE and Egypt maintain a close economic ties and maintain trade between the two countries with imports and exports between the two sides.
Eritrea	28 June 1993	Both countries established diplomatic relations on 28 June 1993: Eritrea has an embassy in Abu Dhabi and a consulate-general in Dubai.; The United Arab Emirates has a military base in Assab.
Ethiopia	5 May 1993	Both countries established diplomatic relations on 5 May 1993 Since the late 2010s, Ethiopia and the United Arab Emirates have developed a comprehensive strategic partnership encompassing political, economic, and security cooperation. Bilateral relations include joint initiatives in humanitarian aid, agriculture, and media, and formal defense cooperation through a military Memorandum of Understanding. Economic ties have strengthened through growing trade, investment in sectors such as renewable energy, agro-industry, chemicals, aluminium, and pharmaceuticals, and the establishment of business offices and advisory initiatives to support Emirati investors. A bilateral currency swap agreement facilitated trade and financial integration, and in 2026 both countries reaffirmed their partnership, emphasizing collaboration on regional peace, security, development, and economic growth.
Kenya	5 June 1982	See Kenya–United Arab Emirates relations
Liberia	6 May 2009	Both countries established diplomatic relations on 6 May 2009: Liberia has a Consulate General in Dubai.; Relations with The UAE are very good with multiple bilateral agreement signed in 2019.
Libya	24 May 1972	See Libya–United Arab Emirates relations The UAE maintains a forward operating base at the Al-Khadim Airport, near Marj.
Senegal	23 July 1973	Both countries established diplomatic relations on 23 July 1973 The United Arab Emirates established an embassy in Dakar in March 2018, which was unveiled by Abdullah Bin Zayed Al Nahyan. The Abu Dhabi Fund for Development loaned Senegal $13 million to invest in rural solar energy.
Somalia	29 November 1972	See Somalia–United Arab Emirates relations Both countries established diplomatic relations on 29 November 1972: Somalia has an embassy in Abu Dhabi.; The United Arab Emirates has an embassy in Mogadishu.
Sudan	December 1971 (Dipiomatic severed 6 March 2026)	See Sudan–United Arab Emirates relations: On 6 March 2025, Sudan filed a case against the UAE at the International Court of Justice, accusing the UAE of complicity in genocide by supporting the Rapid Support Forces, which are alleged to have committed atrocities against the Masalit people in Darfur. The Court dismissed the case on the grounds that it lacks prima facie jurisdiction.

== Americas ==
Country	Formal Relations Began	Notes
Argentina	February 1974	Both countries established relations in February 1974.: In 2008, the UAE opened an Embassy in Buenos Aires.; Argentina has an Embassy in Abu Dhabi.; In 2025, both countries participated in a high-level seminar about Argentina's Incentive Regime for Large Investments, with the UAE signaling intent to increase its trade relations with Buenos Aires. The countries have signed more than 30 bilateral treaties and memoranda of understanding.
Barbados	8 January 1996	Both countries established diplomatic relations on 8 January 1996.: In 2022 the government of Barbados opened an embassy in Dubai.; In 2023 the Government of Dubai signed a deal to operate the sole International airport in Barbados.
Brazil	26 May 1974	Both countries established diplomatic relations on 26 May 1974: Brazil has an embassy in Abu Dhabi.; The United Arab Emirates has an embassy in Brasília.; In 2023, President Lula da Silva visited the UAE, where he met with President of the United Arab Emirates and Ruler of Abu Dhabi Mohammed bin Zayed Al Nahyan. In 2025, the countries signed a Memorandum of Understanding, establishing a partnership in which the UAE committed to invest US$2.5 billion in the rare minerals industry and energy transition in Brazil.
Canada	2 February 1974	See Canada–United Arab Emirates relations Both countries established diplomatic relations on 2 February 1974: Canada has an embassy in Abu Dhabi and a consulate-general in Dubai.; The United Arab Emirates has an embassy in Ottawa.
Chile	23 June 1978	Both countries established diplomatic relations on 23 June 1978: Chile has an embassy in Abu Dhabi.; The United Arab Emirates has an embassy in Santiago.
Colombia	1 January 1976	See Colombia–United Arab Emirates relations Both countries established diplomatic relations on 1 January 1976: Colombia has an embassy in Abu Dhabi.; The United Arab Emirates has an embassy in Bogotá.
Mexico	12 September 1975	See Mexico–United Arab Emirates relations Both countries established diplomatic relations on 12 September 1975: Mexico has an embassy in Abu Dhabi.; The United Arab Emirates has an embassy in Mexico City.
Peru	17 June 1986	Main article: Peru–United Arab Emirates relations Both countries established diplomatic relations on 17 June 1986: Peru has a consulate-general in Dubai.; The United Arab Emirates has an embassy in Lima.
United States	20 March 1972	See United Arab Emirates–United States relations The UAE's strategic relationship with the United States dates back to the 1990 invasion of Kuwait. Subsequent to joining the military effort, the two countries signed an agreement in late 1992 permitting the United States to use some UAE bases temporarily and to pre-position supplies on UAE territory. Since 25 July 1994, a formal Defense Cooperation Agreement has been in place. Ten years later, despite publicly opposing the US led war in Iraq, the UAE permitted a minimal amount of US forces to support the operation from the Al Dhafra air base, Jebel Ali, and naval facilities at Fujairah. Enhancing security relations, has been a US arms sale in March 2000 to the Emirates, valued at $8 billion and included over $2 billion worth of weapons, munitions, and services. A nuclear deal was signed between the US and the UAE meant to supply nuclear technology, expertise and fuel. Despite international opposition to neighboring Iran's nuclear developments, the US is confident of the UAE's compliance with the Nuclear Non-proliferation Treaty and the International Atomic Energy Agency safeguards to refrain from enriching uranium and extracting plutonium. It firmly believes this agreement "has the potential to usher in an era of responsible nuclear-energy development throughout the Middle East." Commercially, the UAE is also the States' largest export market in the Middle East constituting $11.6 billion in exports annually. In March 2005, the US opened negotiations on a free trade agreement and despite intermittent depreciation of currencies in the Persian Gulf area, the UAE dirham remains pegged to the dollar. The two countries have also maintained close ties through an exchange of cultural and educational partnerships which include the Guggenheim Museum, and a number of American Universities opening campuses in the Emirates.: The United Arab Emirates has an embassy in Washington, DC and a consulate-general in Boston, Los Angeles, and New York City.; The United States has an embassy in Abu Dhabi and a consulate-general in Dubai.

== Asia ==
Country	Formal Relations Began	Notes
Afghanistan	6 April 1973	See Afghanistan–United Arab Emirates relations Both countries established diplomatic relations on 6 April 1973: Afghanistan has an embassy in Abu Dhabi and a consulate general in Dubai.; The United Arab Emirates has an embassy in Kabul.
Armenia	25 June 1998	See Armenia–United Arab Emirates relations: Both countries established diplomatic relations on 25 June 1998.; Armenia has an embassy in Abu Dhabi.; The United Arab Emirates has an embassy in Yerevan.
Azerbaijan	1 September 1992	Both countries established diplomatic relations on 1 September 1992: The United Arab Emirates recognized the independence of the Republic of Azerbaijan on 26 December 1991.; Azerbaijan has an embassy in Abu Dhabi.; The United Arab Emirates has an embassy in Baku.
Bahrain	1971	See Bahrain–United Arab Emirates relations: Bahrain has an embassy in Abu Dhabi.; The United Arab Emirates has an embassy in Manama.
China	1 November 1984	See China–United Arab Emirates relations Both countries established diplomatic relations on 1 November 1984 Over the years, the relations between the UAE and China intensified, causing increasing issues with an important western ally, the US. From the Chinese technology to crude oil and to COVID-19 vaccine, the Emirates began to expand its reliance on China. In 2021, the US raised multiple warnings for the Emirates to move back in its growing relations with China. The Biden administration pushed the Emirates to abandon Huawei's telecommunication network, which was a potential threat to a crucial deal of F-35 fighter jet and other military equipment between the UAE and US. The US also warned the Emirates of a military facility that was secretly being built by China at a port near Abu Dhabi. The US intelligence warnings and multiple trips by the American officials to the UAE let to a halt in the construction of the facility.: China has an embassy in Abu Dhabi and a consulate-general in Dubai.; The United Arab Emirates has an embassy in Beijing and consulates-general in Hong Kong and Shanghai.; The UAE and China have been strong international allies, with significant cooperation across economic, political and cultural aspects.
India	23 February 1972	See India–United Arab Emirates relations UAE enjoys close economic and cultural relations with India. Close maritime contact between India and the Arabian Peninsula date back to 3rd and 2nd millennium BC. and textile and spice trade between the two countries flourished during most of 1st millennium AD. The discovery of oil allowed the UAE to increase and diversify its trade relations with India. UAE and India are each other's main trading partners. The trade totals over $75 billion (AED275.25 billion). During the first half of 2010, non-oil trade between India and the UAE stood at US$20.4 billion. UAE is home to more than 3 million Indian expatriates, making Indians the largest ethnic group in the nation.: India has an embassy in Abu Dhabi and a consulate-general in Dubai.; The United Arab Emirates has an embassy in New Delhi.
Indonesia	1976	See Indonesia–United Arab Emirates relations The diplomatic relations between Indonesia and United Arab Emirates are friendly and cordial since they were established in 1976. Both Muslim majority countries, they each recognize the other's important role its respective region. Indonesia has an embassy in Abu Dhabi, while the United Arab Emirates has an embassy in Jakarta. Both countries are partners in multilateral organizations, such as the World Trade Organization (WTO), The Non-Aligned Movement and Organisation of Islamic Cooperation (OIC). Indonesia uses the UAE as the main gate to enter the Persian Gulf and Middle East market, Indonesia's export to UAE is the largest in the Middle East. Indonesian Government has established the trade and investment representative office to promote its products in United Arab Emirates and the entire Middle East region.
Iran	28 October 1972	See Iran–United Arab Emirates relations Both countries established diplomatic relations on 28 October 1972: Iran has an embassy in Abu Dhabi and a consulate-general in Dubai.; The United Arab Emirates has an embassy in Tehran. The embassy is administered by a Chargés d'affaires en pied.; Iran and United Arab Emirates both claim three islands in the Persian Gulf (Abu Musa, Greater Tunb, and Lesser Tunb).; Following the escalation of tensions and armed exchanges between Iran and the United States and Israel, relations between Iran and the United Arab Emirates deteriorated. The Khatam al-Anbiya Central Headquarters of the Iranian Armed Forces, which is led by commanders of the Islamic Revolutionary Guard Corps (IRGC), also warned Emirati leaders not to allow their country to become a "nest for the Americans and Zionists and their military equipment to betray the Islamic world and Muslims."
Iraq	1971	See Iraq–United Arab Emirates relations The 1990 Iraqi invasion and occupation of Kuwait were a shock to the UAE. For the UAE, the crisis over Kuwait demonstrated a lack of Arab unity on a critical Arab issue. The UAE joined the Arab states that opposed the Iraqi invasion and supported the use of force to compel Iraq's withdrawal of troops from Kuwait. Prior to the 2003 invasion of Iraq, the UAE opposed the US-led invasion. In June 2008, the Iraqi government announced that the United Arab Emirates would send an ambassador to Baghdad within a few days. This would become the first Arab ambassador in Iraq since the kidnapping and murder of the Egyptian Ambassador Ihab el-Sherif in July 2005. This announcement was made during a surprise visit by the United Arab Emirates' Foreign Minister Abdullah bin Zayed Al Nahyan to Baghdad on 5 June 2008. This marked the first time a high-ranking official from a Gulf state visited Iraq since March 2003. On 31 July 2007 following Iraq victory of the Asian Cup, Sheikh Mohammed bin Rashid Al Maktoum, vice-president and prime minister of the UAE awarded the Iraq national football team 20 million Dhs, ($5.2 million) for capturing the Asian Cup for the first time in the country's history.
Israel	15 September 2020	See Israel–United Arab Emirates relations: Israel has an embassy in Abu Dhabi and a consulate-general in Dubai.; The United Arab Emirates has an embassy in Tel Aviv.; The Abraham Agreement has opened a new window of opportunity for normalization between Israel and the UAE. However, some analysts, such as Salem Al Ketbi, reject "zero-sum arguments" and suggest that relations with Israel and Iran do not preclude each other. As a response to the Gaza war, the UAE condemned Hamas for its "serious and grave escalation" and its hostage taking.
Japan	1972	Japan was one of the first countries to recognize the UAE as an independent country, officially establishing relations in 1972. The Emirati embassy was inaugurated in Tokyo in 1973 and Japan opened its embassy in Abu Dhabi in 1974. The relationship has traditionally relied on oil diplomacy, as Japan relies on imports. In 2025, the UAE supplied 52,1% of total imports. As part of the diversification of their bilateral relations, the countries have developed a joint space program, exchanging technologies and training. The UAE Space Agency has tapped Mitsubishi Heavy Industries to launch an asteroid exploration mission, expected to launch in 2028.
Jordan	1972	See Jordan–United Arab Emirates relations Jordan was the first country to recognize UAE after forming the union in 1971. The first commander in Chief in the UAE military was Jordanian, and the first commander in Zayed Military college was Jordanian as well. Making Jordan effectively one of a key partners of forming the UAE. The relationship between UAE and Jordan dates to the 1950s, before UAE gain independence and form the union. Jordan at the time used to aid UAE with educational, military, and health care missions, when UAE was still a barren desert.: Jordan has an embassy in Abu Dhabi and a consulate-general in Dubai.; The United Arab Emirates has an embassy in Amman.
Kazakhstan	1992	In 2025 the UAE and Kazakhstan signed over $5 billion in deals, expanding ties in energy, tech, and infrastructure. This followed a 2023 strategic investment agreement and a surge in UAE investment in 2024.
Kuwait	8 March 1972	See Kuwait–United Arab Emirates relations Both countries established diplomatic relations on 8 March 1972: Kuwait has an embassy in Abu Dhabi and a consulate-general in Dubai.; The United Arab Emirates has an embassy in Kuwait City.
Malaysia	11 September 1974	See Malaysia–United Arab Emirates relations The United Arab Emirates has an embassy in Kuala Lumpur, and Malaysia has an embassy in Abu Dhabi. The countries established diplomatic relations in 1983. In 2005 Malaysia's export to the UAE stood at Dh7 billion. Main export items were gold and jewellery, wood products (furniture and parts), palm oil, petroleum products and electrical appliances. In 2007, trade between Malaysia and UAE was worth MYR 14.56 billion making UAE, Malaysia's largest trading partner in West Asia as well as Malaysia being the 10th largest exporter to UAE. In 2009, Malaysian ambassador Datuk Yahaya Abdul Jabar said total trade between Malaysia and UAE from January to November stood at RM19.5 billion. Malaysia's main exports to the UAE are jewellery, consumer electronics and palm oil.
Oman	1 April 1973	See Oman–United Arab Emirates relations Both countries established full diplomatic relations on 1 April 1973: Oman has an embassy in Abu Dhabi and a consulate-general in Dubai.; The United Arab Emirates has an embassy in Muscat.
Pakistan	13 January 1972	Both countries established diplomatic relations on 13 January 1972 See Pakistan–United Arab Emirates relations Pakistan and the UAE are very close allies with extremely close relations based on cultural affinities and shared faith. These relations date back to the UAE's formation in 1971, and have since developed into wide-ranging co-operation in various fields. UAE has been a major donor of economic assistance to Pakistan. Sheikh Zayed International Airport in Rahim Yar Khan, in the Punjab province of Pakistan is an example of UAE's economic assistance as the late president and the founder of the UAE Sheikh Zayed donated the airport to the government of Pakistan. UAE has emerged as one of Pakistan's major economic and trading partners. A large number of Pakistani expatriates, numbering nearly 1.2 million are gainfully employed in UAE.
Qatar	1975	See Qatar–United Arab Emirates relations Both countries established diplomatic relations in 1975. The UAE alongside multiple Middle Eastern and African countries cut diplomatic ties with Qatar in June 2017 due to allegations of Qatar being a state sponsor of terrorism, resulting in the Qatar diplomatic crisis. Ties were restored in January 2021. In June 2023, both countries reopened their embassies and appointed ambassadors in July and August.
Saudi Arabia	21 August 1974	See Saudi Arabia–United Arab Emirates relations Both countries established diplomatic relations on 21 August 1974.: Saudi Arabia has an embassy in Abu Dhabi and a consulate-general in Dubai.; The United Arab Emirates has an embassy in Riyadh and a consulate-general in Jeddah.
Singapore	15 May 1985	Both countries established diplomatic relations on 15 May 1985.: The UAE has an Embassy in Singapore.; Singapore upgraded its consulate in Abu Dhabi to an Embassy in 2008.
South Korea	18 June 1980	See South Korea–United Arab Emirates relations Both countries established diplomatic relations on 18 June 1980: South Korea has an embassy Abu Dhabi.; The United Arab Emirates has an embassy in Seoul.
Syria	19 January 1972	See Syria–United Arab Emirates relations: Both countries established diplomatic relations on 19 January 1972; The UAE has an embassy in Damascus.; Syria has an embassy in Abu Dhabi and a consulate-general in Dubai.; Both countries are members of the Arab League.; On 18 March 2022, Bashar al-Assad visited the UAE for the first time since 2011. He met Dubai's Mohammed bin Rashid Al Maktoum and the UAE President Mohamed bin Zayed Al Nahyan for the peace deal. The US fully opposed the relations building between the UAE and Syria. Despite the US opposition, the UAE was still building relation with Syria. On 19 March 2023, Assad visited the UAE again, with his wife Asma al Assad.
Turkey	21 March 1973	See Turkey–United Arab Emirates relations Both countries established diplomatic relations on 21 March 1973: Turkey has an embassy in Abu Dhabi and a consulate-general in Dubai.; The United Arab Emirates has an embassy in Ankara and a consulate-general in Istanbul.
Turkmenistan	1995	On 14 May 2025, UAE's XRG took a 38% stake in Turkmenistan's Caspian Block I, deepening energy ties after a 2024 high-level visit. Turkmenistan has an embassy in Abu Dhabi and a consulate-general in Dubai. The UAE has an embassy in Ashgabat.
Vietnam	1 August 1993	See United Arab Emirates–Vietnam relations Both countries established diplomatic relations on 1 August 1993: Vietnam has an embassy in Abu Dhabi.; The United Arab Emirates has an embassy in Hanoi.
Yemen		See United Arab Emirates–Yemen relations The UAE and Yemen have a complex and strained relationship, as the UAE has played a significant role in regional politics in Yemen, and has at various points been an adversary of the country, as the UAE's involvement in Yemen, for example the United Arab Emirates takeover of Socotra, and its support for the Southern Transitional Council, a secessionist organization in Southern Yemen, has been a source of tension between the two countries, and has contributed to the ongoing conflict and humanitarian crisis in the country. Furthermore, the UAE has been involved in other efforts in Yemen that have been controversial. The country has been accused of backing local militias and separatist groups that have sought to gain more autonomy or independence from the central government. Some critics have accused the UAE of using these groups to further its own interests in the region, rather than working towards a broader peace and stability in Yemen.

== Europe ==
Country	Formal Relations Began	Notes
Denmark	18 January 1975	See Denmark–United Arab Emirates relations Both countries established diplomatic relations on 18 January 1975: Denmark has an embassy in Abu Dhabi.; The United Arab Emirates is accredited to Denmark from its embassy in Stockholm, Sweden.
France	5 January 1972	See France–United Arab Emirates relations The UAE's relationship with France has been strategically important as it negotiated a defence cooperation agreement and remains one of the country's primary providers of military material. France and the UAE have signed a defence cooperation agreement in order to diversity its procurement from solely the US. Culturally, as the Sorbonne and Louvre are both establishing extensions in the UAE, a plan is in the works to recreate a miniature Lyon city in Dubai complete with public squares, restaurants and museums. On 25 May 2009, the French president Nicolas Sarkozy visited the UAE, Abu Dhabi where he along with UAE's president Sheikh Khalifa Bin Zayed Al Nahyan formally opened a French military base in the United Arab Emirates. This would become France's first permanent base in the Persian Gulf, hosting up to 500 French troops. In addition to the inauguration of Peace Camp, Nicolas Sarkozy visited the site of a Louvre Museum branch which France is opening in the United Arab Emirates. Sheikh Abdullah bin Zayed Al Nahyan, Minister of Foreign Affairs, said that the co-operation with France is a top priority for the UAE's foreign policy.: France has an embassy in Abu Dhabi and a consulate-general in Dubai.; The United Arab Emirates has an embassy in Paris.
Germany	17 May 1972	See Germany–United Arab Emirates relations Both countries established diplomatic relations on 17 May 1972 German exports amount to 5.84 billion Euros. German companies significantly contribute to the UAE's ongoing infrastructure projects and play a leading role in the country's alternative energy developments. Consequently, German Business Park, an area designed to house several of the already seven hundred present companies and their logistical needs, is in the midst of construction.
Greece	21 June 1976	See Greece–United Arab Emirates relations: Greece has an embassy in Abu Dhabi and an economic and commercial affairs office in Dubai.; United Arab Emirates has an embassy in Athens.
Italy	1971	See Italy–United Arab Emirates relations Both countries established diplomatic relations in 1971.: Italy has an embassy in Abu Dhabi and a consulate-general in Dubai.; The United Arab Emirates has an embassy in Rome.
Ireland	8 October 1974	Both countries established diplomatic relations on 8 October 1974: Ireland has an embassy in Abu Dhabi.; The United Arab Emirates has an embassy in Dublin.
Kosovo	14 October 2008	See Kosovo–United Arab Emirates relations: Kosovo has an embassy in Abu Dhabi.; The United Arab Emirates is accredited to Kosovo from its embassy in Ankara, Turkey.
Netherlands	6 May 1972	Both countries established diplomatic relations on 6 May 1972: The Netherlands has an embassy in Abu Dhabi.; The United Arab Emirates has an embassy in The Hague.
Poland	4 September 1989	See Poland–United Arab Emirates relations Both countries established diplomatic relations on 4 September 1989: Poland has an embassy in Abu Dhabi.; The United Arab Emirates has an embassy in Warsaw.
Portugal	20 June 1976	See Portugal–United Arab Emirates relations Both countries established diplomatic relations on 20 June 1976.: Portugal has an embassy in Abu Dhabi.; The United Arab Emirates has an embassy in Lisbon.
Russia	13 November 1985	See Russia–United Arab Emirates relations Both countries established diplomatic relations on 13 November 1985.: Russia has an embassy in Abu Dhabi and a consulate-general in Dubai.; The United Arab Emirates has an embassy in Moscow.
Serbia	21 March 2007	See Serbia–United Arab Emirates relations Both countries established diplomatic relations on 21 March 2007: Serbia has an embassy in Abu Dhabi.; The United Arab Emirates has an embassy in Belgrade.
Spain	10 November 1972	See Spain–United Arab Emirates relations Both countries established diplomatic relations on 10 November 1972.: Spain has an embassy in Abu Dhabi and a commercial office in Dubai.; The United Arab Emirates has an embassy in Madrid.
Switzerland	12 September 1973	See Switzerland–United Arab Emirates relations Both countries established diplomatic relations on 12 September 1973.: Switzerland has an embassy in Abu Dhabi and a consulate-general in Dubai.; The United Arab Emirates has an embassy in Bern.
Ukraine	15 October 1992	Both countries established diplomatic relations on 15 October 1992: Ukraine has an embassy in Abu Dhabi.; The United Arab Emirates has an embassy in Kyiv.; When Russia invaded Ukraine in 2022, the UAE abstained in a U.N. Security Council vote to condemn Russia's invasion. The UAE later condemned Russia in a U.N. General Assembly vote. It did not recognize Russian annexation of Crimea.; In 2025, the UAE offered to host peace talks between Ukraine and Russia. In January 2026, a first round of trilateral talks between the U.S., Kyiv and Moscow took place in Abu Dhabi.
United Kingdom	6 December 1971	See United Arab Emirates–United Kingdom relations British Prime Minister Keir Starmer in Abu Dhabi, December 2024. The United Arab Emirates established diplomatic relations with the United Kingdom on 6 December 1971.: The United Arab Emirates maintains an embassy in London.; The United Kingdom is accredited to the United Arab Emirates through its embassies in Abu Dhabi and Dubai.; The UK governed the United Arab Emirates from 1920 to 1971, when the United Arab Emirates achieved full independence. Both countries share common membership of the World Trade Organization. Bilaterally the two countries have a Defence Cooperation Accord, an Investment Agreement, and a Partnership for the Future. Both countries are negotiating a Free Trade Agreement.

== Oceania ==
Country	Formal Relations Began	Notes
Australia	16 March 1975	See Australia–United Arab Emirates relations: Australia has an embassy in Abu Dhabi and a consulate-general in Dubai.; The United Arab Emirates has an embassy in Canberra.
New Zealand	20 May 1985	Both countries established diplomatic relations on 20 May 1985: New Zealand has an embassy in Abu Dhabi.; The United Arab Emirates has an embassy in Wellington.; In January 2025, the New Zealand and UAE governments signed a comprehensive economic partnership agreement, cutting tariffs on 98.5% of New Zealand exports to the UAE.
Vanuatu	25 June 2009	Both countries established diplomatic relations on 25 June 2009.: Vanuatu has a consulate in Abu Dhabi.; The UAE has appointed a non-resident ambassador to Vanuatu.

== See also ==
- List of diplomatic missions in the United Arab Emirates
- List of diplomatic missions of the United Arab Emirates
- List of foreign military bases in the United Arab Emirates
- Visa requirements for Emirati citizens
- Expatriates in the United Arab Emirates
