= Kosovo–United Arab Emirates relations =

Kosovo–United Arab Emirates

- Kosovo: United Arab Emirates

Diplomatic mission
- Embassy of Kosovo, Abu Dhabi: none

Envoy
- Ambassador Avni Arifi: none

Kosovo–United Arab Emirates relations are foreign relations between Kosovo and the United Arab Emirates.

== History ==
Kosovo declared its independence from Serbia on 17 February 2008 and the United Arab Emirates recognised it on 14 October 2008. Kosovo has an embassy in Abu Dhabi. On 27 April 2010, the United Arab Emirates designated Khalid Khalifa Al-Mualla, who is the Emirati ambassador to Turkey, as its non-resident ambassador to Kosovo.

On 13 March 2014, Kosovo and the UAE agreed to open mutual embassies, organise a forum for businessmen in Abu Dhabi to explore investment opportunities in Kosovo and signed a cooperation agreement between the two countries in the field of air transport services.

== Diplomatic relationships ==
=== Kosovo War ===
After the Serbian government launched a major offensive against the ethnic Albanian population in Kosovo in 1998, the UAE called for international intervention and commenced a major program of humanitarian relief through its Red Crescent Society. In 1999, the UAE was among the first non-NATO states to voice support for NATO's bombing campaign. During the UN administration period, the UAE maintained almost 1,500 peacekeeping and special operations troops in Kosovo. The UAE was the only Arab state to offer to participate in the Kosovo Force and its commitment was the first operational deployment of UAE forces outside the Middle East region. These forces remained in Kosovo and between 1998 and 2008. The aid given to Kosovo by the UAE's Red Crescent Authority alone amounted to Dh125 million, which at the time in 2008 was the biggest international humanitarian mission in the UAE's history.

== See also ==
- Foreign relations of Kosovo
- Foreign relations of the United Arab Emirates
- Serbia–United Arab Emirates relations
