= Denmark–United Arab Emirates relations =

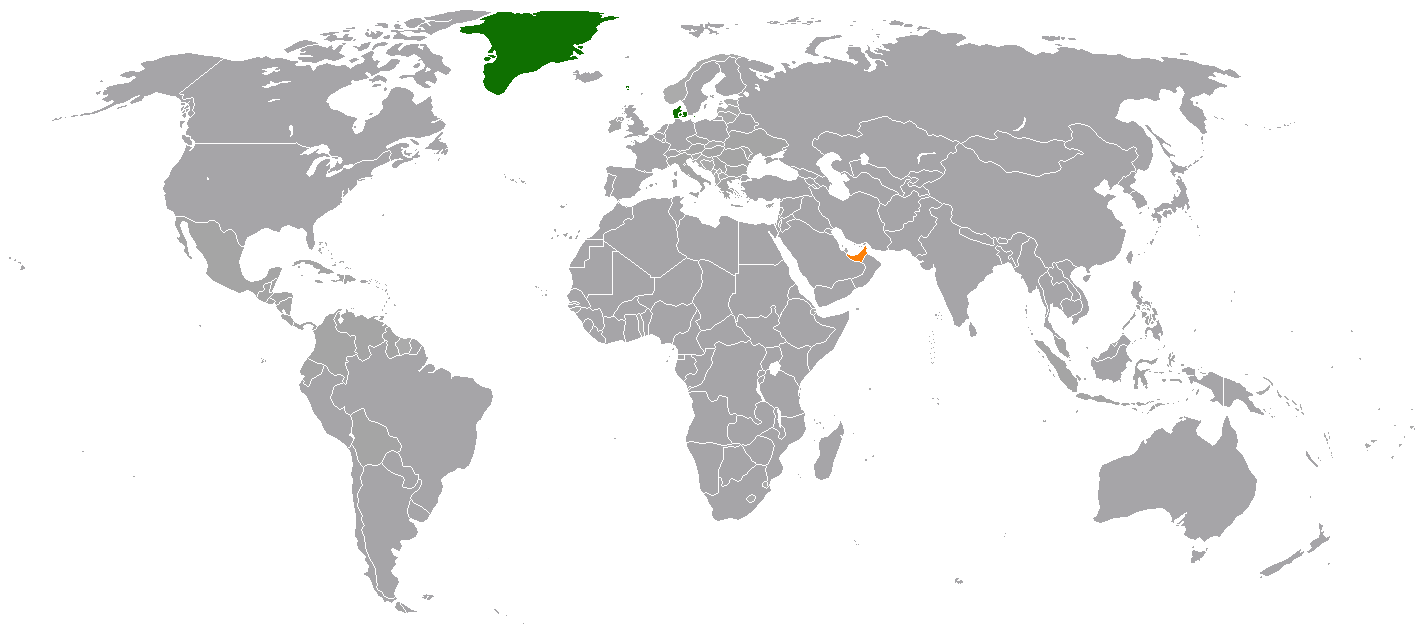

- Denmark: United Arab Emirates

Denmark–United Arab Emirates relations refers to the bilateral relations established between Denmark and the United Arab Emirates. The UAE does not have a diplomatic mission in Denmark although Denmark maintains a consulate in Dubai and also announced the reopening of an embassy in Abu Dhabi in 2010, more than a decade after it was closed because of budget cuts.

== Expatriate community ==
There is also a small expatriate community of Danes in the United Arab Emirates. As of 2010, their number was around 2,000, up from just 400 since 2005.

== Diplomatic relations ==
=== Reaction to the Jyllands-Posten Muhammad cartoons controversy ===
Relations between the two were strained following the Jyllands-Posten Muhammad cartoons controversy. Summoning non-resident Danish ambassador to UAE Hans Klingenberg to his office in 2008, UAE Foreign Affairs Minister Anwar Mohammed Qarqash remarked that the UAE was "keen to bolster and sustain relations with many countries worldwide, including the kingdom of Denmark" but reiterated the stance of the UAE "on non-mixing up the Press freedom and ridiculing Islam". He added that the event had cast a shadow on the bilateral relations, noting that the Danish government could do more to stop the defamation of Islam and that the UAE would remain "vocal and tolerant, and build foreign relations," but would "not tolerate attacks on its Islamic heritage."

== Resident diplomatic missions ==
- Denmark has an embassy in Abu Dhabi and a consulate-general in Dubai.
- the United Arab Emirates has an embassy in Copenhagen.
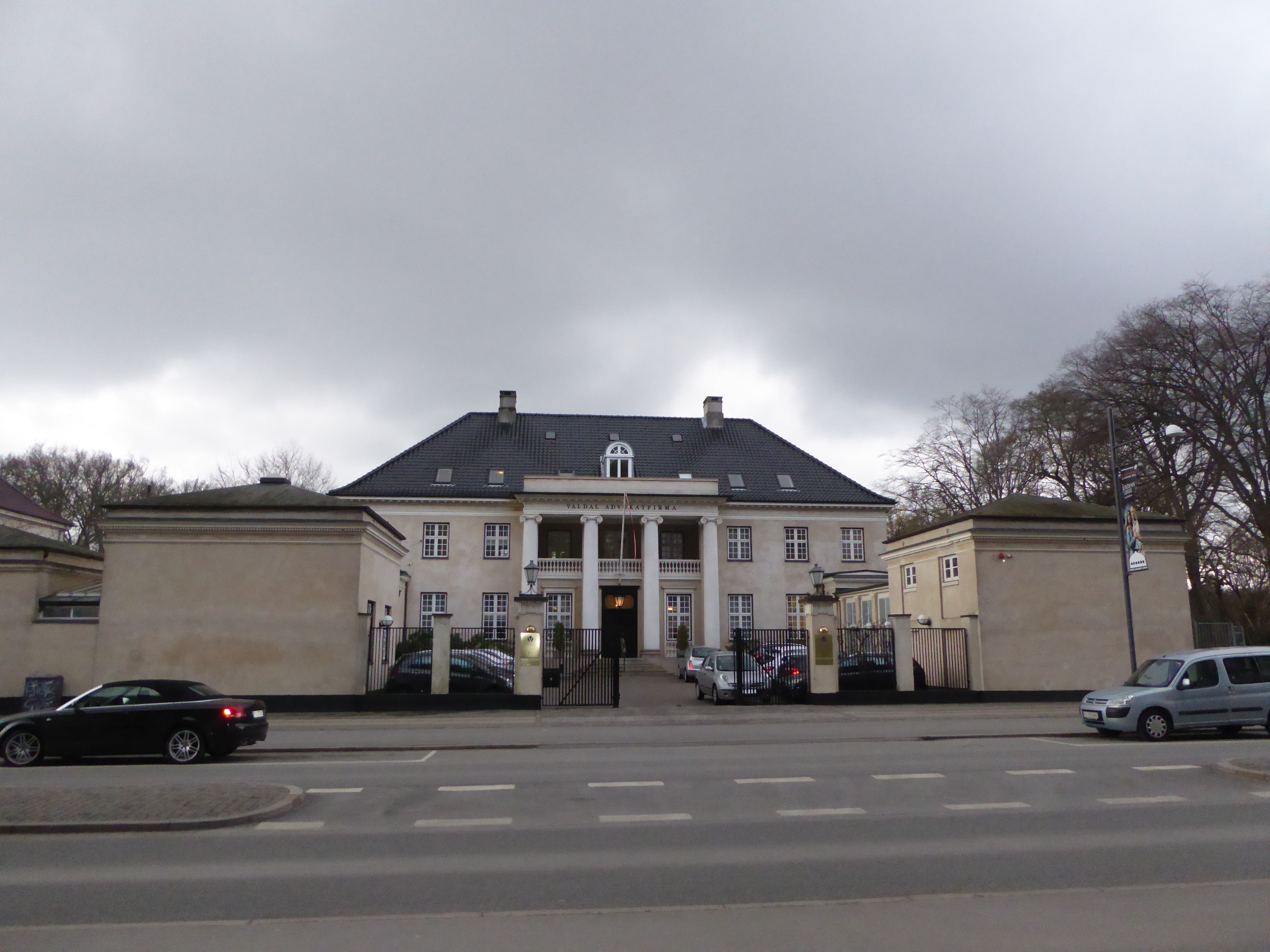
Embassy of the United Arab Emirates in Copenhagen

== See also ==
- Foreign relations of Denmark
- Foreign relations of the United Arab Emirates
