= Spain–United Arab Emirates relations =

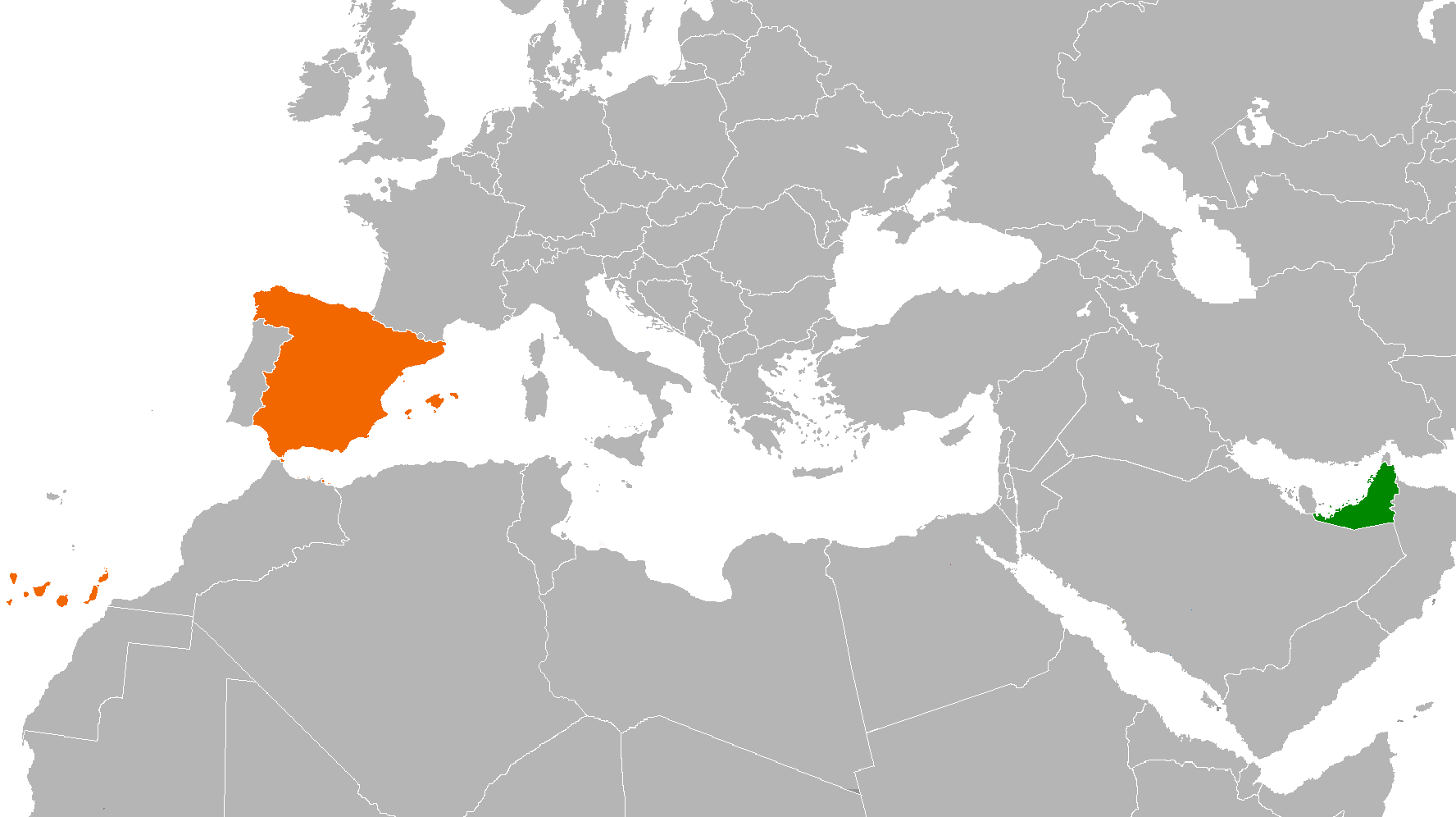

- Spain: United Arab Emirates

Spain–United Arab Emirates relations are the bilateral and diplomatic relations between these two countries. Spain has an embassy in Abu Dhabi and an Economic and Commercial Office in Dubai. The UAE has an embassy in Madrid and a consulate general in Barcelona.

== Bilateral relations ==
Bilateral relations have known, since May 2008, a considerable revitalization following the visit of the State of the King of Spain, having since found a line of constant continuity through frequent exchanges of high-level visits, particularly the official visit of the Princes of Asturias to Abu Dhabi in January 2010 or the first of a Spanish Government President in February / March 2011.

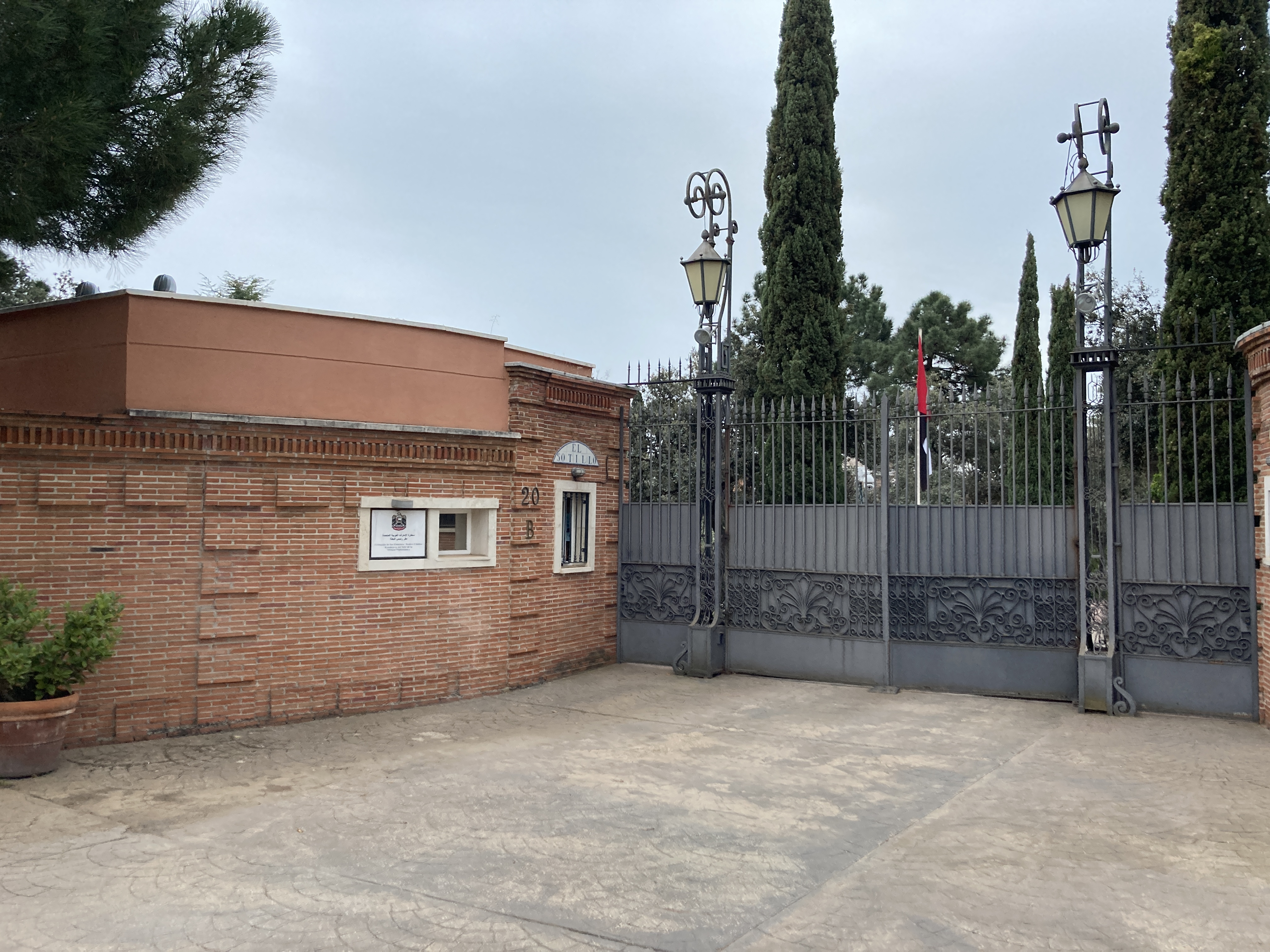
Residence of the UAE ambassador in Alcobendas

Despite the excellent state of bilateral relations and the enormous affinity in bilateral and international affairs, the dispute regarding renewable energies arose after the revision of the regulatory framework by the Spanish authorities (2013) and that has affected important Emirati investments in Spain.

In 2020, the Royal House announced, after some controversy, that the former King Juan Carlos would be residing abroad in the UAE. He has been residing in Abu Dhabi ever since.

== See also ==
- Foreign relations of Spain
- Foreign relations of the United Arab Emirates
