= Syria–United Arab Emirates relations =

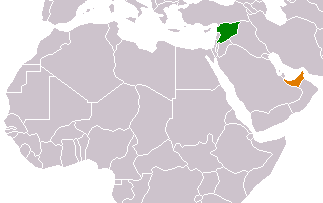

- Syria: United Arab Emirates

Syria–United Arab Emirates relations refer to the relationship between the United Arab Emirates (UAE) and Syria. The UAE has an embassy in Damascus and Syria has an embassy in Abu Dhabi and a consulate-general in Dubai. Both countries are members of the Arab League, part of the Middle East region and share close cultural ties.

== Diplomatic relations ==
=== Early years (1972–2011) ===
The United Arab Emirates and Ba'athist Syria established diplomatic relations on 19 January 1972. Relations between the two countries remained timid under Hafez al-Assad and later his son, Bashar al-Assad.

=== Syrian civil war and suspension of diplomatic ties (2011–2018) ===
In 2011, the Syrian civil war began. The UAE broke diplomatic ties with Syria in February 2012 after the nationwide suppression of protests by Bashar al-Assad that escalated into civil war.

On 25 September 2013, Foreign minister Abdullah bin Zayed Al Nahyan said that the UAE would continue to support the Syrian people and their legitimate aspirations for restoring security and stability to the country. On 13 January 2014, Vice President, Prime Minister and Emir of Dubai Sheikh Mohammed bin Rashid Al Maktoum said that there could be no long-term solution to ending the war with Assad in power, and predicted that the Syrian president would eventually lose power.

The UAE stance on the Syrian conflict has been described as "less aggressive" than Saudi Arabia or Qatar—but, unlike Egypt, not "favourable to Assad". However, it has exhibited openness to Assad remaining in power as part of a peace settlement. It has been critical of Saudi, Qatari and Turkish support for Islamist rebel groups in Syria.

The UAE took part in the 2014 American-led intervention in Syria against the ISIL. It later broke with Saudi Arabia by supporting the 2015 Russian military intervention in the Syrian civil war, maintaining it was against a "common enemy". It also reportedly provided funding for the moderate Southern Front, through an Amman-based Military Operations Center, although this center has been inactive since 2017. Alongside the United States, it has been involved in supporting and training the Kurdish-dominated Syrian Democratic Forces (SDF) between 2017 and 2018. Along with Egypt and Russia, it also supported the Syria's Tomorrow Movement, which has a military wing, the Elite Forces, that is part of the SDF.

=== Reapproachment (2018–2024) ===
The UAE initially floated normalising relations with Syria in 2016 in order to reduce Syrian dependence on Iran, but the suggestion was rejected by the United States.

In April 2018, Emirati Foreign Minister of State Anwar Gargash stated, "Our position on the Syrian crisis is very clear: a few years ago we had a choice—to support Bashar Assad or the opposition, which was joined by jihadists and even many terrorist elements, and we chose to be somewhere between. We confirm the need for a political solution in Syria. It is impossible to achieve stability in this country through a military solution."

In June 2018, Gargash criticised the decision to suspend Syrian membership of the Arab League, noting, "it meant we had no political leverage at all, no open channel, we could not present an Arab prism to how the Syrian issue should be resolved."

In November 2018, it was reported that the United Arab Emirates was negotiating with Syria over the reopening of its embassy in Damascus, already had a diplomat permanently stationed there, and was acting as an intermediary between Syria and Saudi Arabia in reconciliation talks involving those two countries. On 27 December 2018, the United Arab Emirates announced it had reopened its embassy in Damascus, after over six years of closure. The UAE issued a statement that said the country was "keen to put relations back on their normal track", while Gargash tweeted that "An Arab role in Syria has become even more necessary to face the regional expansionism of Iran and Turkey."

In early January 2019, following the embassy opening, Emirates, FlyDubai and Etihad announced plans to fly to Syria again, but no announcement has been made regarding when flights will restart. In an attempt to restore ties with the Syrian government, the UAE hosted a Syrian trade delegation in January 2019. The meeting was led by a businessman and lawmaker who has been on US Treasury sanctions list since 2011.

On 29 January 2019, the UAE Minister of State of Foreign Affairs said regarding the Israeli strikes on Syria that the UAE supported Syria and a united capable Arab Syria. However, he also said that the UAE was against the Iranians' presence in Syria and that the dispute is caused by the freedom of movement Iran has in Syria.

In December 2019, the UAE's Chargé d'Affaires in Damascus, Abdul Hakim Ibrahim al-Nuaimi, praised the "wise leadership of President Bashar al-Assad" and described relations between the countries as "solid, distinct and strong". Syrian deputy foreign minister Faisal Mekdad responded by stating, "We cannot forget that the United Arab Emirates stood by Syria in its war against terrorism".

From 2011 to 2019, the UAE has accepted 100,000 Syrians from Syria, mostly family members of Syrian expatriates who were already living in the UAE. The UAE is not signatory to the 1951 Refugee Convention, hence it does not refer to the Syrians as refugees. The UAE used its labour migration policy as a quasi asylum policy.

On 27 March 2020, Abu Dhabi crown prince Mohamed bin Zayed Al Nahyan and Assad discussed the COVID-19 pandemic on phone.

In April 2020, according to the Middle East Eye the UAE allegedly had promised Assad money to break a ceasefire with the Turkish-backed rebels and restart the Idlib offensive in order to tie up Turkish support in Syria and allow Russian backed rebels in western Libya campaign to advance, but Russia objected.

On 9 November 2021, United Arab Emirates Foreign Minister Abdullah bin Zayed Al Nahyan met with Assad, for the first time since the outbreak of the Syrian civil war in 2011, to discuss "ways to develop cooperation in different sectors that are of common interest".

In March 2022, Assad visited the UAE, which was his first visit to an Arab country since the start of the Civil War. He met Mohammed bin Zayed Al Nahyan, Mohammed Al Maktoum and Mansour bin Zayed Al Nahyan. According to Emirati state media, Mohamed bin Zayed Al Nahyan "stressed that Syria is a fundamental pillar of Arab security, and that the UAE is keen to strengthen cooperation with it". The UAE's decision to welcome Assad was condemned by the US. The Biden administration said it was "profoundly disappointed and troubled" by the UAE's attempt to normalise ties with Assad.

In January 2023, the UAE joined Russia in promoting reconciliation in Syria–Turkey relations, following the restoration of Turkey–United Arab Emirates relations in 2022.

In March 2023, Assad conducted a state visit to the UAE where he was received in Abu Dhabi by Mohamed bin Zayed Al Nahyan. On 6 February 2024, President Bashar al-Assad received the credentials of Hassan Ahmed Muhammad Suleiman Al-Shehhi as Ambassador Extraordinary and Plenipotentiary of the United Arab Emirates to the Syrian Arab Republic. Al Shehhi is the first UAE ambassador to Syria since 2011.

At an Arab League summit in May 2024, Syria backed the UAE's claim to Abu Musa and the Greater and Lesser Tunbs over that of its ally, Iran.

=== Post-Assad (2024–present) ===
In December 2024 during the fall of the Assad regime, the UAE called on all Syrian parties “to prioritize wisdom" and to fulfil "the aspirations and ambitions of all segments of the Syrian population". Emirati diplomat Anwar Gargash said Assad did not use the "life line" for constitutional discussions offered to him by various countries, and that Syria should have free elections so the Syrian people can determine their future.

Syrian foreign minister Asaad Hassan al-Shibani made an official visit to the United Arab Emirates on 6 January 2025 where he discussed bilateral relations with Emirati foreign minister Sheikh Abdullah bin Zayed.

Syrian President Ahmed Al Sharaa visited the United Arab Emirates on 13 April 2025 for the first time and met Sheikh Mohammed bin Zayed Al Nahyan. The two leaders discussed areas of mutual interest and exchanged views on regional and international developments. The UAE resumed flights to Syria after the meeting between the two leaders. Flights between Syria and the UAE were previously suspended in early January 2025 after the eruption of the conflict surrounding the fall of Assad.

== See also ==
- Foreign relations of Syria
- Foreign relations of the United Arab Emirates
