= Egypt–United Arab Emirates relations =

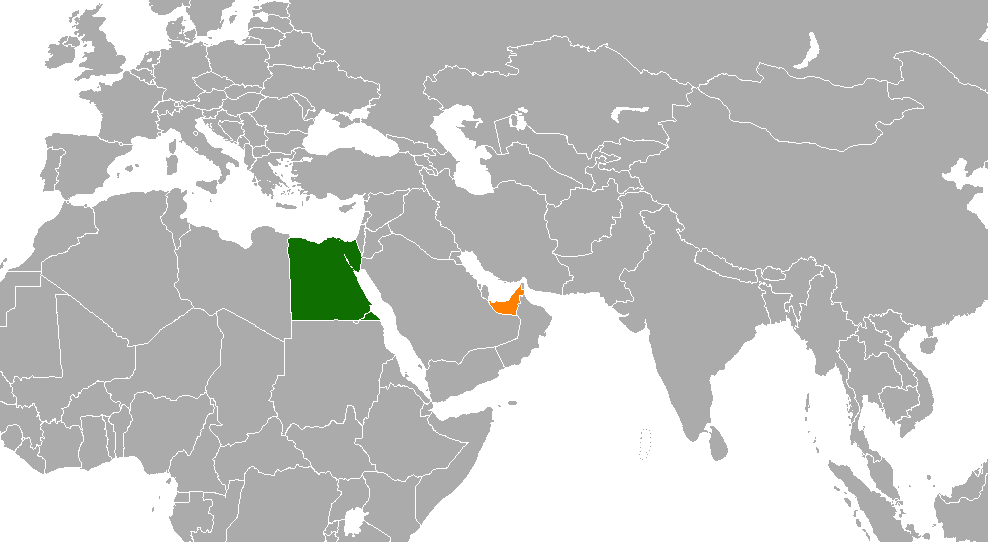

- Egypt: United Arab Emirates

Since the independence of the United Arab Emirates from Britain in 1971, Egypt and the UAE relations (Arabic: العلاقات المصرية الإماراتية) were always at a good level and developing at an unprecedented rate. Egypt has an embassy in Abu Dhabi and consulate-general in Dubai while the UAE maintains an embassy in Cairo. The bond of friendship between the leaders of both countries has reflected on the growing political, economic and cultural ties between them, and as a result the UAE ranks first among Arab and foreign countries investing in Egypt. UAE and Egypt maintain a close economic ties and maintain trade between the two countries, with imports and exports between the two sides. The government of the UAE, by an order from Sheikh Khalifa bin Zayed Al Nahyan the President of UAE, gave Egypt cargo ships carrying 1,000,000 tonnes of wheat as a food gift to the people of Egypt. The UAE supported the overthrow of Mohamed Morsi in 2013, and has since become one of Egypt's closest allies in the Middle East, alongside Saudi Arabia and Bahrain.

Egypt and the UAE have both supported and supplied troops to the Saudi-led intervention in the Yemeni civil war. The two countries have also cooperated in Libya, intervening in the Second Libyan Civil War on behalf of the Tobruk-based House of Representatives. Despite usual cooperation in global affairs, Egypt and the UAE have taken opposite sides in the 2023 Sudan conflict. Egypt has backed the Sudanese Armed Forces, and the United Arab Emirates the Rapid Support Forces.

== See also ==
- Foreign relations of Egypt
- Foreign relations of the United Arab Emirates
