= List of foreign military bases in the United Arab Emirates =

Base	State(s)	Ref
Al Minhad Air Base	Australia United Kingdom	
Al Dhafra Air Base	United States	
Camp de la Paix	France	

== See also ==
- Foreign relations of the United Arab Emirates
- List of countries with overseas military bases
