= Russia–United Arab Emirates relations =

- Russia: United Arab Emirates

Diplomatic mission
- Embassy of Russia, Abu Dhabi: Embassy of the United Arab Emirates, Moscow

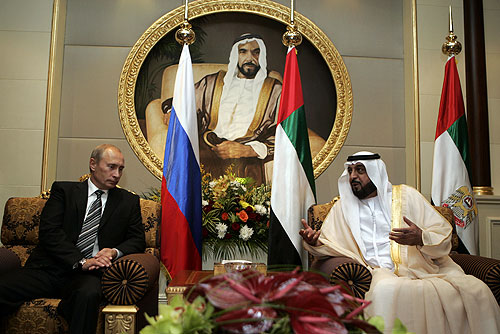
UAE's President Khalifa bin Zayed Al Nahyan with the Russian President Vladimir Putin on 10 September 2007.

The relationship between the Russian Federation and the United Arab Emirates (UAE) stretches back to December 1971, when the Soviet Union and the UAE established diplomatic relations. Relations between the two countries have been described as close and a "somewhat strategic partnership", with the countries cooperating closely in Iraq, Egypt, and Libya.

== Background ==
The Soviet Union and the UAE established formal diplomatic relations on 8 December 1971. In 1986, the Soviet embassy in Abu Dhabi was officially established and opened, while the UAE embassy in Moscow was opened in 1987.

== Modern relations ==
Russia has an embassy in Abu Dhabi, and the UAE has an embassy in Moscow. In 2002, a Russian consulate-general was established in Dubai.

In November 2015, the UAE was the sole Gulf Cooperation Council member state that publicly endorsed the 2015 Russian military intervention in the Syrian civil war, describing it as against a "common enemy" of the two nations.

During 2017, the UAE sought to drive a wedge between Russia and Iran, with which the UAE has had a strained relationship. In coordination with Saudi Arabia and Israel, the UAE encouraged the Trump administration, which has been generally considered close to Russia, to remove sanctions on Russia pertaining to its activity in Ukraine in exchange for Russian assistance in ending the Iranian military presence in Syria.

During the Second Libyan Civil War, the UAE backed the Tobruk-based House of Representatives, led by Abdullah al-Theni. Apart from the UAE, al-Thani's administration and its military forces (commanded by General Khalifa Haftar) received a significant amount of financial, military, and other assistance also from Chad, Cyprus, Egypt, France, Greece, Israel, Jordan, Saudi Arabia, and Russia. The latter's support was particularly substantial, encompassing not only financial assistance and military supplies but also the deployment of the Russian government-controlled mercenary group the Wagner Group to Libya.

Al-Thani's Tobruk-based government managed to receive all of this support and assistance, despite the Tripoli-based Government of National Accord being internationally recognized as the sole legitimate executive authority in Libya, and, consequently, enjoyed support of the United Nations and was (financially and militarily) backed primarily by Algeria, Iran, Italy, Pakistan, Qatar, Sudan, Turkey, and Ukraine.

In 2019, the UAE purchased $710 million of anti-tank weapons from Russia.

=== Economic and diplomatic relations following the Russian invasion of Ukraine (2022–present) ===
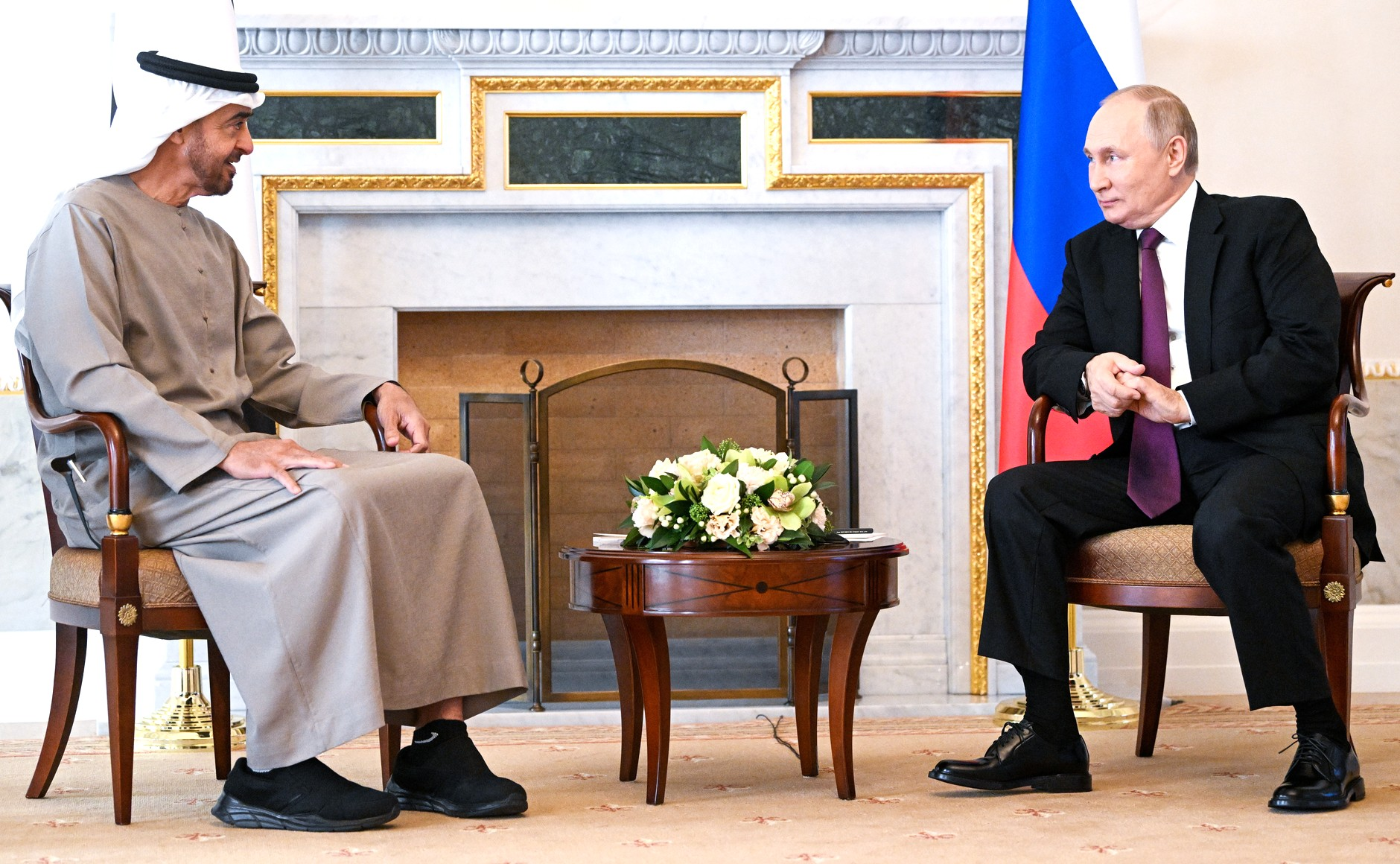
UAE's President Mohamed bin Zayed Al Nahyan with Russian President Vladimir Putin, days after OPEC+ cut oil production, 11 October 2022

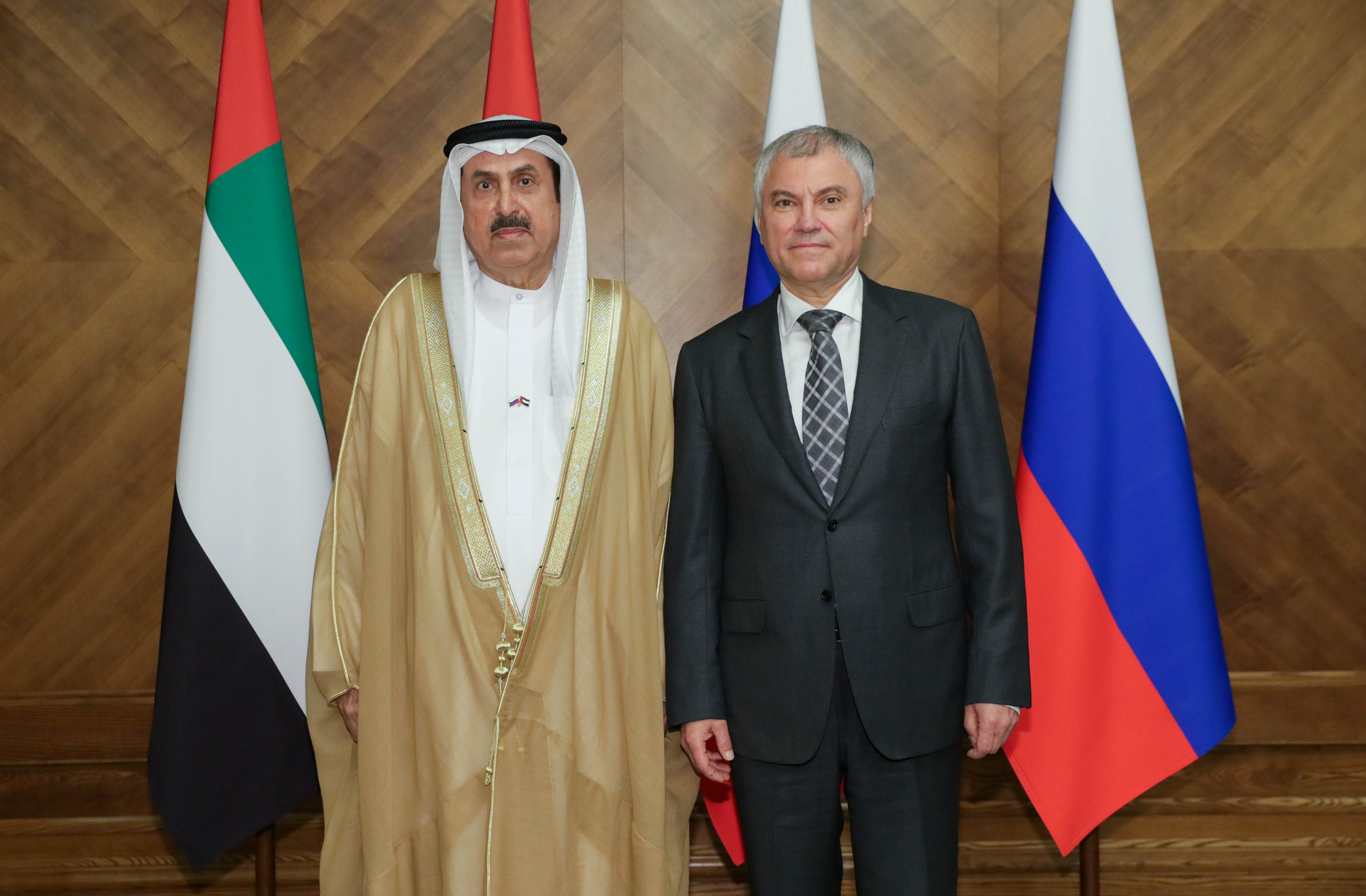
Saqr Ghobash with Vladimir Putin's close associate Vyacheslav Volodin in Moscow, Russia, 24 May 2023

Following the 2022 Russian invasion of Ukraine, trade between the two nations strengthened with many Russians relocating to the UAE to invest in real estate, business, or "escape financial restrictions in Europe". Trade between the two countries has doubled to $5 billion since 2020 and there are approximately 4,000 companies with Russian roots that are operating within the country.

In February 2022, Russia supported an Emirati UN Security Council resolution to extend the arms embargo on the Houthis to all members of the Yemen-based rebel group, in a deal that was purportedly for Emirati abstention on Ukraine resolutions.

According to the leaked confidential US documents, titled "Russia/UAE: Intelligence Relationship Deepening", the Russian intelligence officials were engaged in strengthening their relations with the United Arab Emirates. The document stated that Russia had convinced the Emirates "to work together against US and UK intelligence agencies". It also concluded that the UAE viewed it as an "opportunity" to diversify its partnerships, while the US was gradually parting ways from the Emirates. However, the UAE government had dismissed the accusations that they were maintaining close ties with Russian intelligence.

Against the backdrop of rising economic and political engagement with Russia, the UAE Central Bank granted a license to MTS Bank in February 2023, aimed at meeting growing demands for financial services for Russians in the UAE. The issue of new banking licenses in the UAE is rare, and the decision generated criticism accusing the UAE of providing safe harbour to sanctioned individuals. On 31 March 2023, the UAE Central Bank revoked MTS Bank's license citing "sanctions risks associated with the bank". It is noted that MTS Bank were not sanctioned when their license was granted, with the UK Foreign Secretary stating MTS was sanctioned on 24 February 2023 in an effort to "further isolate Russia from the international financial system and [...] prevent circumvention [of sanctions]".

On 23 August 2023, at the 15th BRICS summit, Russia, along with the other founding members of BRICS, formally invited the United Arab Emirates and others to join the organization on 1 January 2024. When the date was reached, the United Arab Emirates officially joined BRICS.

In early 2024, following mediation efforts by the UAE, Russia and Ukraine exchanged hundreds of prisoners of war.

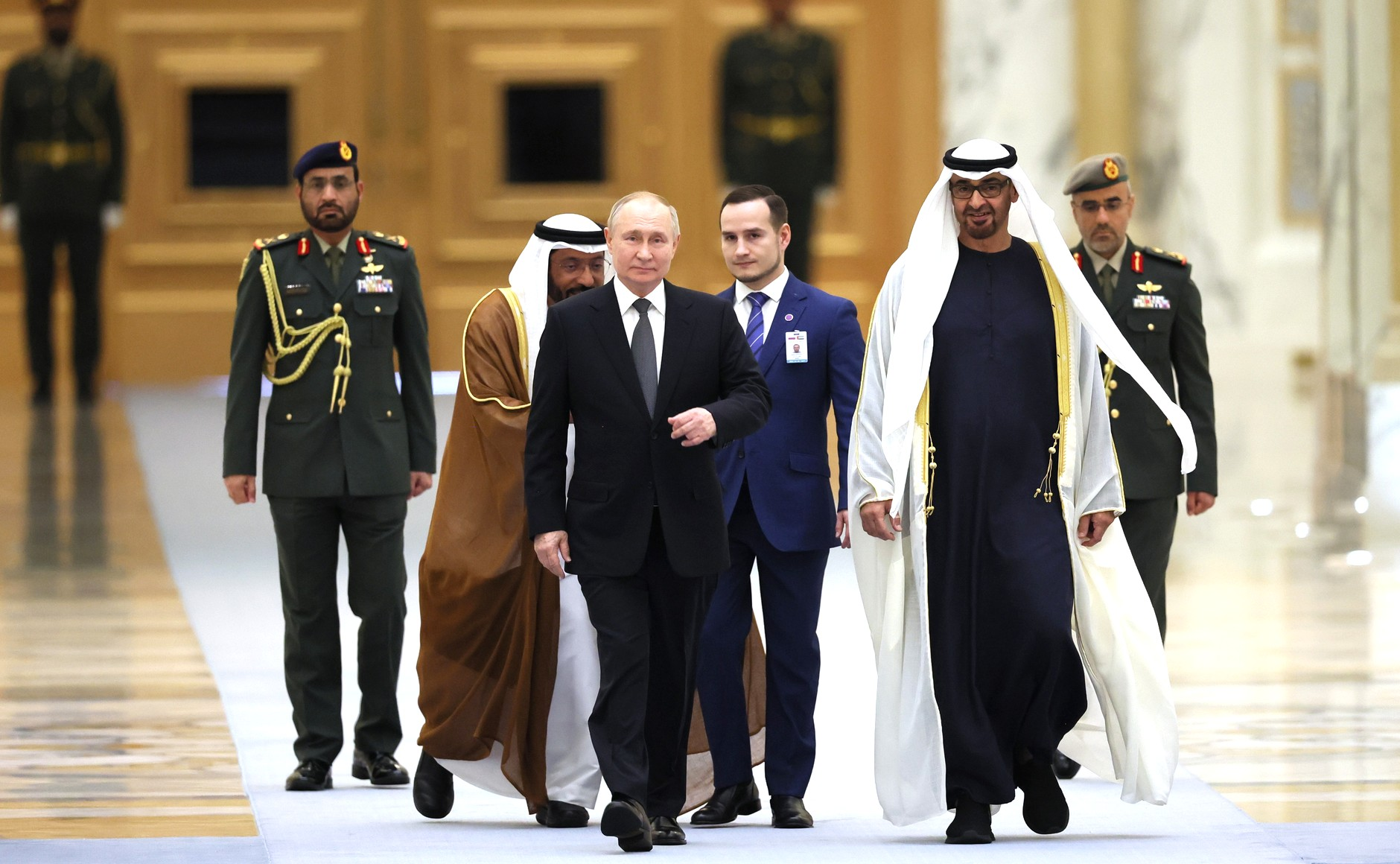
UAE's President Mohamed bin Zayed Al Nahyan with Russian President Vladimir Putin in Abu Dhabi, 6 December 2023

On 1 May 2024, the US sanctioned almost 300 firms and individuals, including numerous legal and natural persons from China and the UAE, over accusations that they were supporting the Russian invasion of Ukraine. The United States Department of the Treasury imposed sanctions on the UAE-based Albait Al Khaleeja General Trading LLC for facilitating the passage of sanctioned goods to reach Russia. The company, supposedly an auto parts exporter, was involved in supplying over 6,800 shipments to Russian consumers. Meanwhile, the US, UK, and the EU were also putting pressure on the UAE to share the country's record of the crackdown on firms evading sanctions imposed on Russia.

Former DMCC Chairman, Hamad Buamim pointed out the inefficiency of US sanctions against Russia, stating that the sanctions have had no impact outside the West. He also stated that the attempt to halt the flow of business had redirected it to other areas, and that the sanctions were making trade more complex and affecting the entire world. Due to its strategic geographical location, the UAE has played a crucial role in connecting the West and the East, due to its geographical position. Dubai, in particular, significantly benefited from American and European efforts to isolate and hamper the Russian economy. Following Switzerland's imposition of sanctions on Russia, oil traders eventually shifted away from Geneva to the UAE. However, Buamim said businesses were not relocating to Dubai due to sanctions, but because of the city's infrastructure.

== Resident diplomatic missions ==
- Russia has an embassy in Abu Dhabi and a consulate-general in Dubai.
- The United Arab Emirates has an embassy in Moscow.
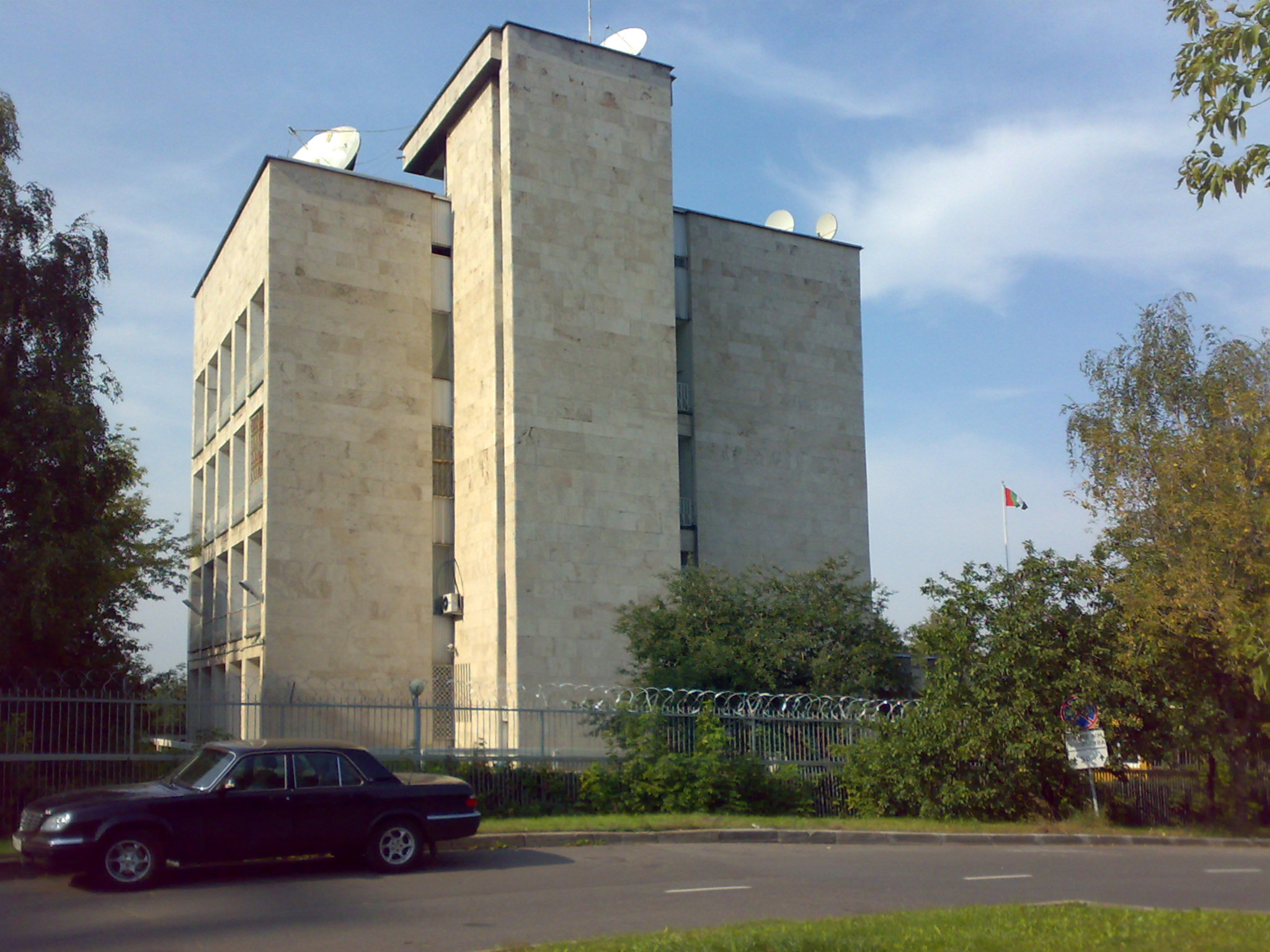
Embassy of the United Arab Emirates in Moscow

== See also ==
- Foreign relations of Russia
- Foreign relations of the United Arab Emirates
- List of ambassadors of Russia to the United Arab Emirates
