= France–United Arab Emirates relations =

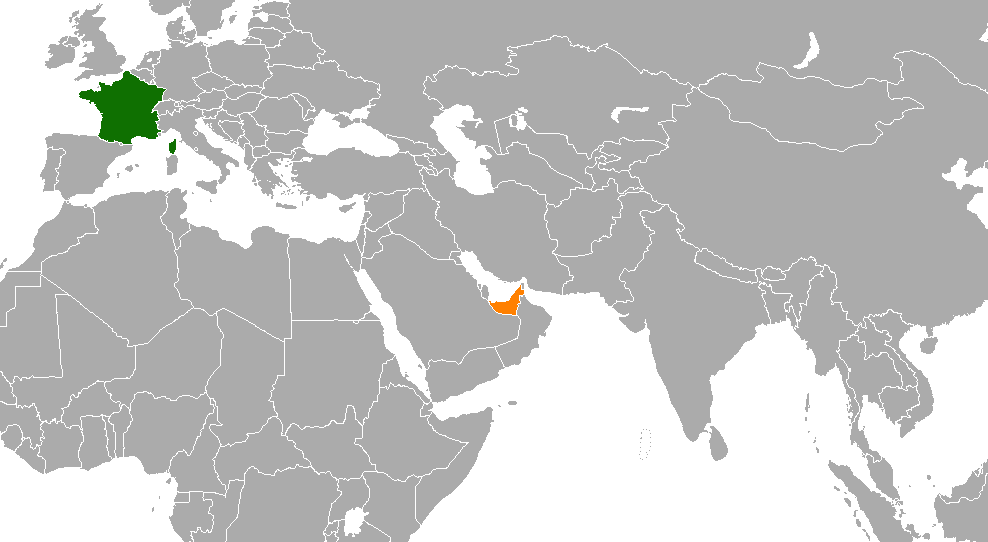

- France: United Arab Emirates

Diplomatic mission
- France Embassy, Abu Dhabi: United Arab Emirates Embassy, Paris

France–United Arab Emirates relations are the foreign relations between France and the United Arab Emirates.

== History ==
The ambassador of the United Arab Emirates (UAE) to France, Khalifa Ahmad Mubarak, was assassinated in Paris on 8 February 1984.

Militarily, the UAE and France negotiated a defence cooperation agreement to diversify the UAE's procurement of weaponry, in addition to a significant military relationship with the United States; France is one of the country's primary providers of military matériel.

Culturally, as of 2008 the Sorbonne university and Louvre museum were both establishing extensions in the UAE, and there was a plan to recreate a miniature Lyon city in Dubai complete with public squares, restaurants and museums.

On May 25, 2009, French president Nicolas Sarkozy visited Abu Dhabi, UAE, where he and the UAE's president Sheikh Khalifa Bin Zayed Al Nahyan formally opened a French military base, France's first permanent base in the Persian Gulf, with up to 500 French troops. Sarkozy also visited the site of a Louvre Museum branch which France is opening in the United Arab Emirates. Sheikh Abdullah Bin Zayed Al Nahyan, Minister of Foreign Affairs, said that co-operation with France was a top priority of UAE foreign policy.

On September 15, 2021, Crown Prince of Abu Dhabi Mohamed bin Zayed Al Nahyan met French president Emmanuel Macron in Paris to discuss the situation in Afghanistan and to improve cooperation between the two nations.

In November 2021, the expanding efforts to improve relations between the two nations saw a visit by Emmanuel Macron to the UAE. Following the meeting, the French Defense Ministry announced that a weapons deal worth 16 billion euros ($18 billion) was signed with the UAE, which included 80 upgraded Rafale warplanes and 12 Airbus-built combat helicopters. While Macron said the contracts were important to deepen the military ties with the Gulf nation, the human rights groups raised concerns about the Emirates’ involvement in the conflicts in Yemen and Libya. The rights groups said that the deal was even more objectionable because of the Gulf nation’s failure in improving its human rights records.

In April 2024, the UAE intruded the Paris book fair, through an Emirati research centre, Trends Research & Advisory. Representatives of the institution distributed English and Arabic brochures against the Muslim Brotherhood, which is the main focus of the Emirati bookshops. They also distributed research of Group 42, which included issues related to the use of AI in the fight against Covid-19. Intelligence Online suggested that Trends might use its senior adviser and the IRIS director, Pascal Boniface, to help UAE navigate its way into Paris.

In July 2024, Intelligence Online revealed that Abu Dhabi was considering to order 12 more Rafale fighter jets from Dassault Aviation. Several sources suggested that the contract might include the Neuron, a combat drone. However, there were doubts around completion of the deal. Abu Dhabi was considering an offset agreement to order more Rafales, despite official French denial of the initial contract signed in 2021, which also received criticism from human rights groups. On 4 April 2026, in the middle of its conflict with Iran, the UAE withdrew from the Rafale program altogether.

== Resident diplomatic missions ==
- France has an embassy in Abu Dhabi and a consulate-general in Dubai.
- United Arab Emirates has an embassy in Paris.
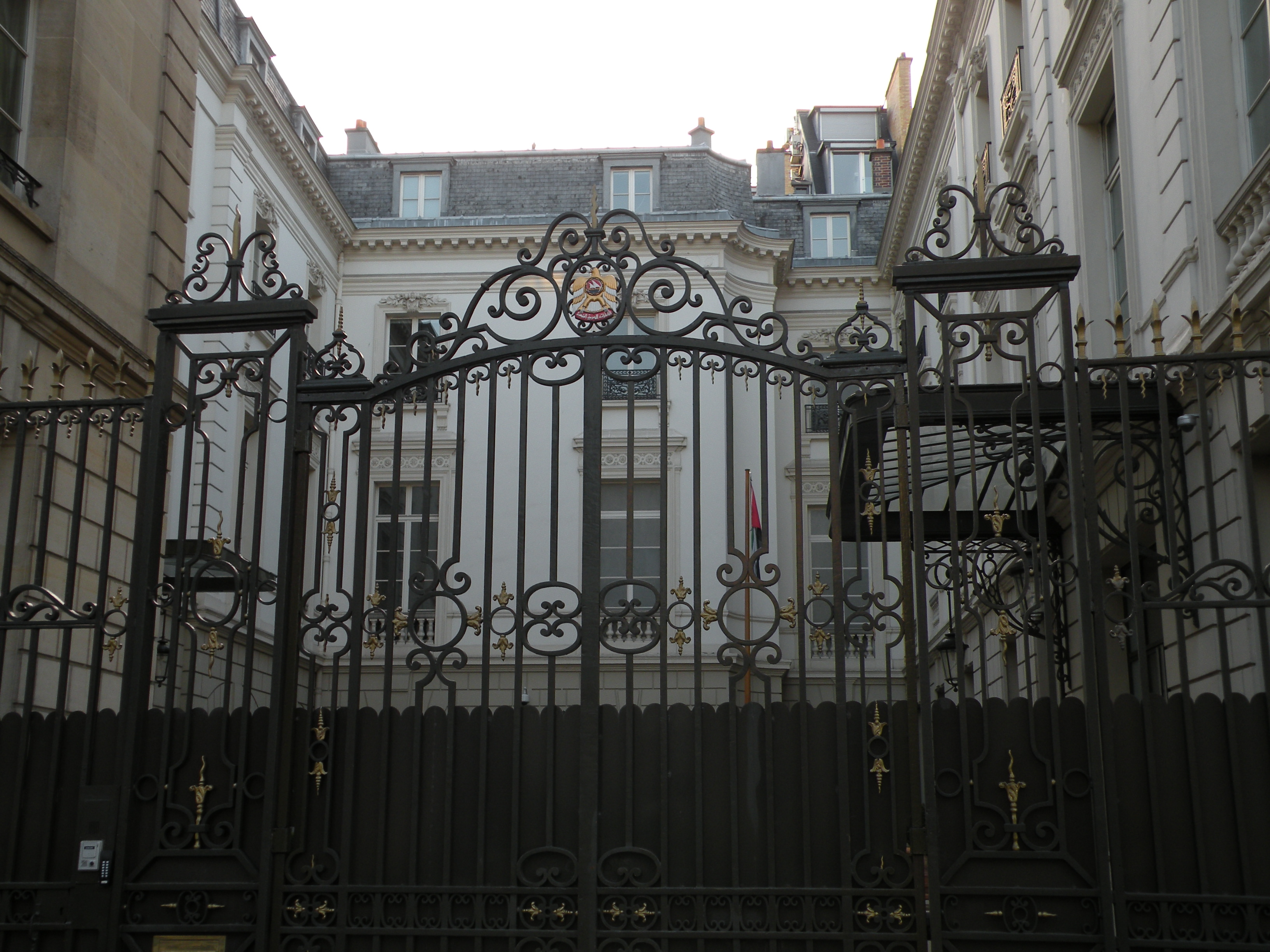
Embassy of the United Arab Emirates in Paris

== See also ==
- Foreign relations of France
- Foreign relations of the United Arab Emirates
- French people in the United Arab Emirates
