= Zhang Zhijun (diplomat) =

Chinese diplomat

- 张志军

Chinese Ambassador to the United Arab Emirates
- In office August 2001 – October 2006
- Preceded by: Zhu Dacheng
- Succeeded by: Gao Yusheng (diplomat, born 1955)

Personal details
- Born: February 1946 (age 80) Beizhen County, Liaoning, China
- Party: Chinese Communist Party
- Education: Beijing International Studies University

Chinese name
- Simplified Chinese: 张志军
- Traditional Chinese: 張志軍
Transcriptions
Standard Mandarin
- Hanyu Pinyin: Zhāng Zhìjūn

Zhang Zhijun (Chinese: 张志军; born February 1946) is a Chinese diplomat who served as Chinese Ambassador to the United Arab Emirates from 2001 to 2006.

== Early life and education ==
Zhang was born in Beizhen County (now Beizhen), Liaoning, in February 1946, and graduated from Beijing International Studies University.

== Career ==
Zhang joined the Foreign Service in 1971. In 2001 he succeeded Zhu Dacheng as Chinese Ambassador to the United Arab Emirates, serving in that position from 2001 to 2006.

== Awards ==
- 9 October 2006 Medal of Independence (First Class)

Diplomatic posts
Preceded by Zhu Dacheng	Chinese Ambassador to the United Arab Emirates; 2001–2006	Succeeded by Gao Yusheng (diplomat, born 1955)
