= Colombia–United Arab Emirates relations =

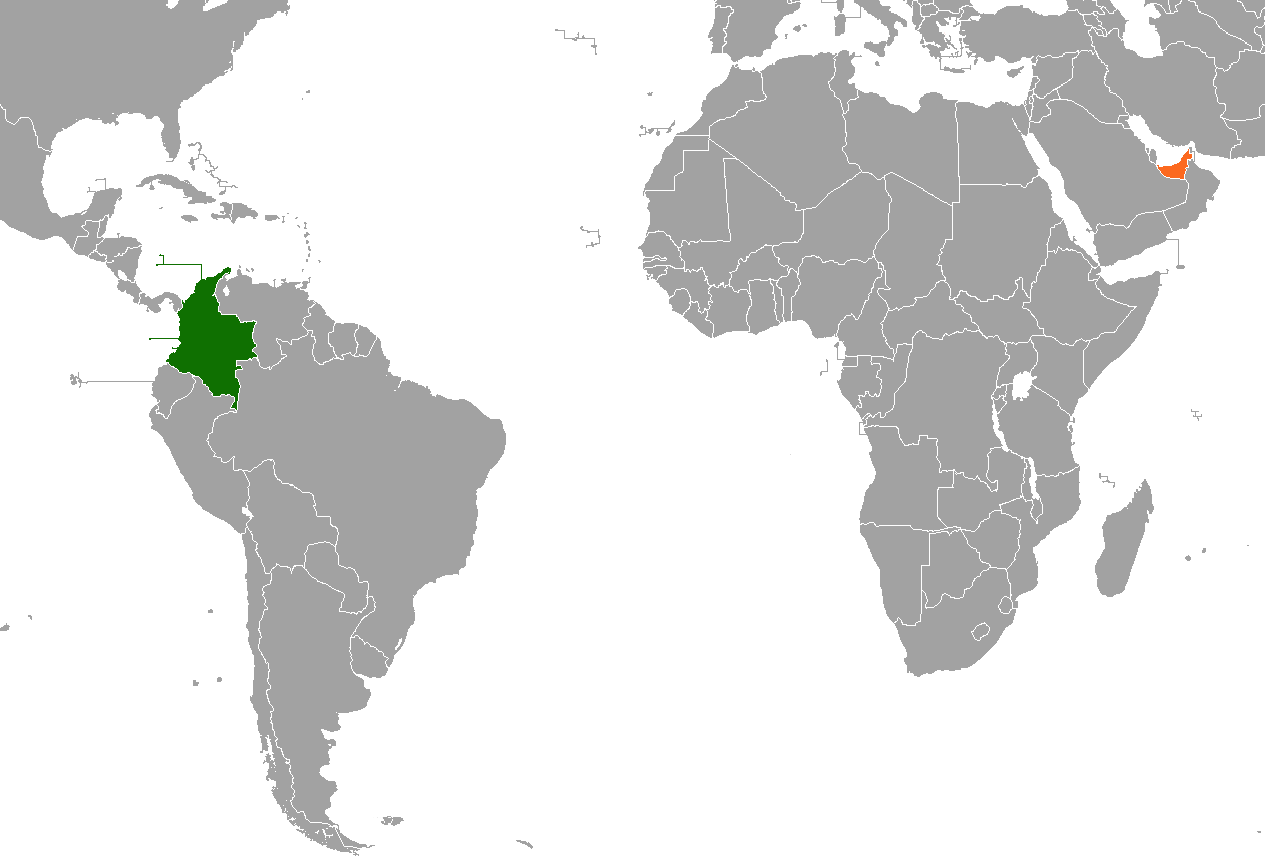

- Colombia: United Arab Emirates

Colombia–United Arab Emirates relations are the bilateral relations between Colombia and the United Arab Emirates (UAE). The two countries are members of the United Nations, Group of 77 and the Non-Aligned Movement.

== History ==
Colombia and the UAE established bilateral relations on January 1, 1976. In August 2011, Colombia opened its embassy in Abu Dhabi. Three years later on October 21, 2013, the United Arab Emirates opened its embassy in Bogotá. In August 2024, Colombia and the United Arab Emirates formalized a project by having a memorandum of understanding signed, which led to the donation of a hospital to La Guajira.

== High-level visits ==
High-level visits from Colombia to the United Arab Emirates

- President Juan Manuel Santos (2017)
- Foreign Minister Carlos Holmes Trujillo (2018)
- Vice President and Foreign Minister Marta Lucía Ramírez (2022)
- Minister of Mines and Energy Irene Vélez Torres (2023)
- President Gustavo Petro (2023)
- President Gustavo Petro (2025)

High-level visits from the United Arab Emirates to Colombia

- Minister of Education Hussain Ibrahim Al Hammadi (2018)
- Foreign Minister Abdullah bin Zayed Al Nahyan (2019)
- Minister of State for International Cooperation Reem Al Hashimy (2023)

== Bilateral agreements ==
Both nations have signed bilateral agreements such as a memorandum of understanding between the civil aviation authorities of the Republic of Colombia and the United Arab Emirates (2009); Memorandum of Air Transport between the Government of the United Arab Emirates and the Government of Colombia (2011); Air Services Agreement (ASA) (2012); Memorandum of Understanding for the establishment of Political Consultations between the Ministry of Foreign Affairs of Colombia and the Ministry of Foreign Affairs of the United Arab Emirates (2014); Memorandum of Understanding to create a joint commission on cooperation (2014); Agreement between the Republic of Colombia and the United Arab Emirates on mutual exemption from the requirement of entry visas for holders of diplomatic and official or special passports (2014); Agreement between the Republic of Colombia and the United Arab Emirates for the Exchange of Information on Tax Matters (2016); Agreement on cultural, educational and sports cooperation between the Republic of Colombia and the United Arab Emirates (2016); Memorandum of Understanding on cooperation for efficient and sustainable agricultural production between the Ministry of Agriculture and Rural Development of the Republic of Colombia and the Ministry of Climate Change and Environment of the United Arab Emirates (2016); Bilateral agreement on the promotion and protection of investments between the Republic of Colombia and the United Arab Emirates (2017); Agreement between the Republic of Colombia and the United Arab Emirates for the elimination of double taxation with respect to income taxes and the prevention of tax evasion and avoidance (2017); Memorandum of Understanding between the Presidential Cooperation Agency (APC) and the Abu Dhabi Fund for Development (ADFD) (2017); Memorandum of Understanding between the Augusto Ramírez Ocampo Diplomatic Academy and the Anwar Gargash Diplomatic Academy of the United Arab Emirates (2023) and a Comprehensive Economic Partnership Agreement between the Ministry of Commerce, Industry and Tourism of the Republic of Colombia and the Ministry of Foreign Trade of the United Arab Emirates (2023).

== Trade ==
In 2022, United Arab Emirates exported $105M to Colombia. The products exported from the United Arab Emirates to Colombia included metal stoppers ($20.1M), cars ($12.9M), and ethylene polymers ($9.61M). Colombia exported $259M to the United Arab Emirates. The products exported from Colombia to the United Arab Emirates were gold ($174M), precious metal ore ($44.1M), and coffee ($8.85M).

In 2023, non-oil bilateral trade between both countries experienced an increase compared to 2022, which was worth $553 million. On August 8, 2024, UAE ambassador to Colombia Mohammed Abdullah Al Shamsi held a meeting with Minister of Finance and Public Credit of Colombia Ricardo Bonilla González to discuss about economic agreements that could strengthen ties between the two countries. Al Shamsi proclaimed that agreements would attract more investments and amplify trade and economic partnerships between Colombia and the United Arab Emirates.

== Resident diplomatic missions ==
- Colombia has an embassy in Abu Dhabi.
- United Arab Emirates has an embassy in Bogotá.

== See also ==
- Foreign relations of Colombia
- Foreign relations of the United Arab Emirates
