= Malaysia–United Arab Emirates relations =

- Malaysia: United Arab Emirates

Malaysia–United Arab Emirates relations refers to foreign relations between Malaysia and United Arab Emirates. United Arab Emirates has an embassy in Kuala Lumpur, and Malaysia has an embassy in Abu Dhabi. Relations between the two countries are mainly in economic co-operation.

== History ==
Malaysia established its embassy in Abu Dhabi in 1983 with the main purpose to strengthening its political, economic and socio-cultural links with the country. In the October of 1995 the United Arab Emirates established their embassy in Kuala Lumpur. Since 27 September 2022 the relationship between the two countries have officially been raised to "Strategic Partnership".

== Relations ==
Since 2008, United Arab Emirates has become one of the Malaysia's largest trading partner among the GCC countries with a total trade around Dh21.6 billion. A large number of United Arab Emirates companies have invested in Malaysia such as Abu Dhabi Commercial Bank, Mubadala, Limitless and Adia. There are around 6,000 Malaysians in United Arab Emirates with many of them working in the professionals sectors both in foreign and local companies. The communities have played an important role to strengthen the relationship between the two countries. United Arab Emirates embassy has recognised a number of Malaysian companies in the country in promoting the Malaysian brand. An agreement in avoidance of double taxation also has been signed to boost economic co-operation between the two countries. Currently, the United Arab Emirates in the process to seeks more opportunities to invest in Malaysia. In May 2014, following the visit of Prime Minister Najib Razak to United Arab Emirates, a memorandum of understanding between Lulu Hypermarket and the Federal Land Development Authority (FELDA) was signed for the establishment of ten Lulu Hypermarkets in Malaysia. As a mark of close friendship relations between the two countries, the then Crown Prince of United Arab Emirates Sheikh Mohammed Zayed al Nahyan has proposed to build a mosque in Kuala Lumpur as a gift to Malaysia, with an architecture design similar to the Sheikh Zayed Grand Mosque. While another two memorandum of understanding on tourism and higher education has been signed during the meeting. During an investigation into the 1MDB scandal, the then UAE crown prince, Mohammed Bin Zayed was asked to donate money by Najib Tun Razak.

== Resident diplomatic missions ==
- Malaysia has an embassy in Abu Dhabi and a consulate-general in Dubai.
- the United Arab Emirates has an embassy in Kuala Lumpur.

== See also ==
- Foreign relations of Malaysia
- Foreign relations of the United Arab Emirates
- Malaysians in the United Arab Emirates
