= Indonesia–United Arab Emirates relations =

- Indonesia: United Arab Emirates

Indonesia and the United Arab Emirates (UAE) established diplomatic relations in 1976. Diplomatic relations between both nations are important because they share solidarity as Muslim majority countries. Indonesia has an embassy in Abu Dhabi and a consulate-general in Dubai, while the United Arab Emirates has an embassy in Jakarta. Both nations are members of the World Trade Organization (WTO), Non-Aligned Movement, BRICS and the Organisation of Islamic Cooperation (OIC).

== History ==
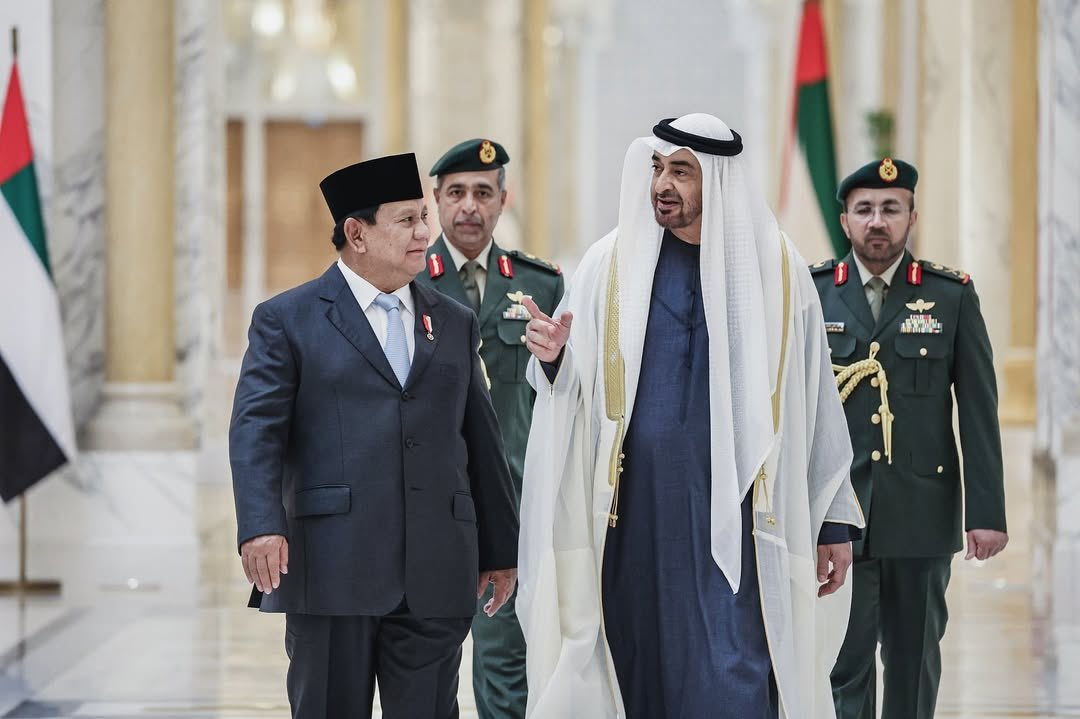
Presidents Prabowo Subianto and Mohamed bin Zayed Al Nahyan at the Qasr Al Watan.

Indonesia was one of the first nations to recognize the United Arab Emirates upon its independence in 1971. Diplomatic relations have been established since 30 April 1976. Former Indonesian President Suharto visited the UAE in October 1977, and the Indonesian embassy in Abu Dhabi was established a year later. The former president B. J. Habibie, by then a minister, also visited the UAE in 1988.

Emirati President Sheikh Zayed bin Sultan Al Nahyan's visit to Indonesia in May 1990, followed by the establishment of the United Arab Emirates' embassy in Jakarta on 10 June 1991, further strengthened the relations between two nations.

In May 2006, Indonesian President Susilo Bambang Yudhoyono visited the UAE and met President Sheikh Khalifa Bin Zayed Al Nahyan.

On 14 November 2022, President Joko Widodo and his Emirati counterpart, Sheikh Mohamed bin Zayed Al Nahyan, inaugurated the Sheikh Zayed Grand Mosque in the city of Surakarta. Built at a cost of $20 million, it is a smaller replica of the grand mosque in Abu Dhabi, and is named in honor of the UAE's founder, Sheikh Zayed bin Sultan Al Nahyan.

On 17 July 2024, Presidents Joko Widodo and Mohamed bin Zayed Al Nahyan discussed a raft of agreements including co-operation on infrastructure development, artificial intelligence and other environmental issues. They also had a discussion to accelerate the Comprehensive Economic Partnership Agreement (CEPA) which was signed between both nations in July 2022. Jokowi also performed a prayer in President Joko Widodo Mosque, a mosque named after him in Abu Dhabi. He also received the Order of Zayed, the highest civilian honor that the UAE leader confers to world leaders and heads of state.

On 23 November 2024, the newly elected Indonesian President Prabowo Subianto visited the UAE. He and Sheikh Mohamed observed the signing of a number of memorandums of understanding in important fields during the meeting, such as mining and infrastructure, industry and advanced technology, energy, health, culture, tourism, and governance and reform. He visited the UAE again on 9 April 2025, where he and Sheikh Mohamed announced eight bilateral agreements including cooperation in energy transition, food security, marine affairs, security and counterterrorism, trade and economy, as well as religious affairs.

== Economy and trade ==
Indonesia sees the United Arab Emirates as a strategic ally and business center of the world, especially in the Middle East. Indonesia uses the UAE as the main gate to enter the Persian Gulf and Middle Eastern market, hence Indonesia exports more to the UAE than any other country in the region. The Indonesian Government has established a trade and investment representative office to promote its products in the United Arab Emirates and the rest of the Middle East.

The trade volume between Indonesia and the UAE stood at more than US$2.18 billion in 2008. The value of Indonesia's exports to the UAE has exceeded more than US$1 billion, with Indonesia's primary exports to the UAE consisting of more than 200 items, such as textiles, garment, paper, plywood, furniture (Indonesia covers 35% of the UAE's market) and electronics. While the value of the UAE's exports to Indonesia is around US$400 million, consisting of products among others; lubricant oil, chemical products, aluminum ore, iron scraps and corn flour. The UAE has announced a plan to invest US$10 billion in the Indonesia Investment Authority (INA) which will fund infrastructure projects, tourism and agriculture.

The United Arab Emirates is also a popular destination for Indonesian workers in the Middle East. In 2020, approximately around 36 thousand Indonesian workers work in the UAE.

Indonesia and the United Arab Emirates signed a free trade agreement on 1 July 2022. The agreement will come into force once it is ratified by both countries.

== Resident diplomatic missions ==
- Indonesia has an embassy in Abu Dhabi and a consulate-general in Dubai.
- The United Arab Emirates has an embassy in Jakarta.

== See also ==
- Foreign relations of Indonesia
- Foreign relations of the United Arab Emirates
