= Germany–United Arab Emirates relations =

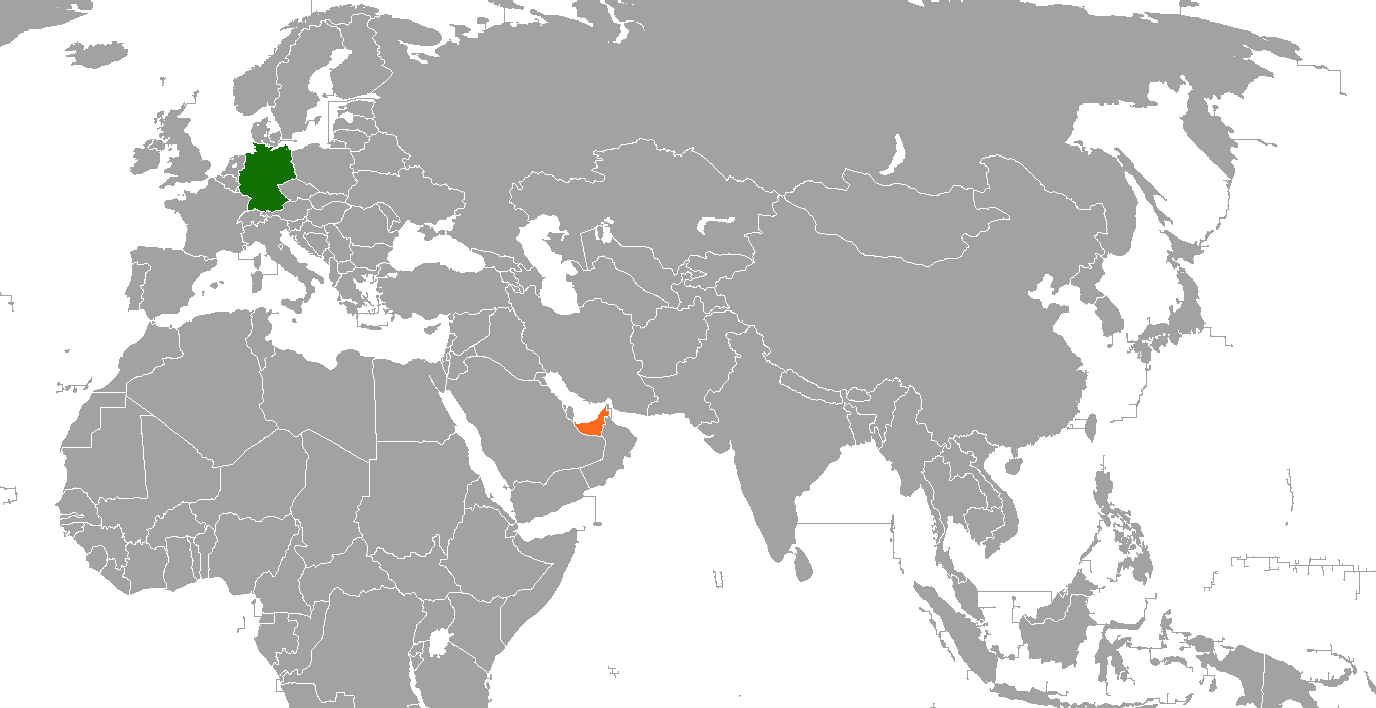

- Germany: United Arab Emirates

The United Arab Emirates and Germany established relations in May 1972. The U.A.E. has an embassy in Berlin and consulate-general in Munich while Germany maintains an embassy in Abu Dhabi and a consulate-general in Dubai. German exports amount to 5.84 billion Euros. German companies significantly contribute to the UAE's ongoing infrastructure projects and play a leading role in the country's alternative energy developments. Consequently, German Business Park, an area designed to house several of the already seven hundred present companies and their logistical needs, is in the midst of construction. There are thousands of expatriate Germans in the United Arab Emirates who have helped maintain connections between the two countries.

== History ==
Contacts between the two societies can be traced back to the early 20th century, when the German explorer Hermann Burchardt visited the British Trucial States in 1908 and photographed the ruler of Abu Dhabi. In the 1960s, German companies were involved in building infrastructure in what is now the UAE. Shortly after the UAE gained independence from the United Kingdom, the country established diplomatic relations with the Federal Republic of Germany in October 1972. Four years later, the UAE opened an embassy in Bonn. After German reunification, the UAE moved its embassy from Bonn to Berlin and inaugurated the new embassy building in 2004. In the same year, the two countries agreed on a strategic partnership to increase cooperation. Two years later, the German Academic Exchange Service and the Goethe Institute opened foreign offices in Abu Dhabi, and a joint German-Emirati Chamber of Commerce and Industry was established in 2009.

In 2017, the two countries entered into an energy partnership that focuses on promoting energy efficiency and renewable energy sources. In June 2019, they adopted a Memorandum of Understanding on a comprehensive strategic partnership with enhanced cooperation in the fields of security, energy, politics, economics, and culture. In doing so, the two countries reaffirmed their "friendly ties and stable partnership."

== Economic exchange ==
Both countries are close economic partners, and economic relations have been steadily expanded since the 2000s. The joint trade volume stood at 8.0 billion euros in 2021, ranking the UAE 42nd in the list of Germany's trading partners. Germany exports machinery, aircraft, automobiles, electronic equipment and chemicals to the UAE. The UAE sells mainly aluminum and petrochemical products to Germany. Germany does not import crude oil from the UAE and therefore has a strong trade surplus in bilateral trade. Numerous German companies are active in the country and, as part of an energy partnership, German companies are involved in setting up production facilities for the manufacture of hydrogen.

== Cultural relations ==
In the UAE, there are three German language schools in the cities of Dubai, Abu Dhabi and Sharjah. There are also more than 20 bilateral collaborations in the higher education sector. In 2020 and 2021, Germany was the guest country at the 30th and 31st International Book Fairs in Abu Dhabi, respectively. At Expo 2020 in Dubai, Germany and the state of Baden-Württemberg were represented with their own pavilions.

The football national teams of the two countries met for the first time at the 1990 World Cup. The Germany national football team won the group stage match 5-1. Further international matches between the two teams took place in 1994 and 2009 as part of friendly matches, which Germany won 2-0 and 7-2 respectively.

== Military relations ==
The UAE is seeking an active military and political role in the region and, as a coalition partner of Saudi Arabia and the United States, is involved in regional conflicts, including the Yemen Civil war. The German arms industry supplies weapons to the UAE armed forces. In 2018, the value of German arms deliveries to the country amounted to 45 million euros. In 2020, the UAE was the third-largest buyer of German weapons, with arms deliveries worth 51.3 million euros.

== Migration ==
In 2008, nearly 10,000 Germans lived in the city of Dubai, many of them entrepreneurs or technical specialists. Recently, the city has become the adopted home of several well-known German Internet influencers. In Dubai, an influencer license can be obtained from the resident government in exchange for a sum of money and positive coverage of the UAE's authoritarian government.

== Diplomatic locations ==
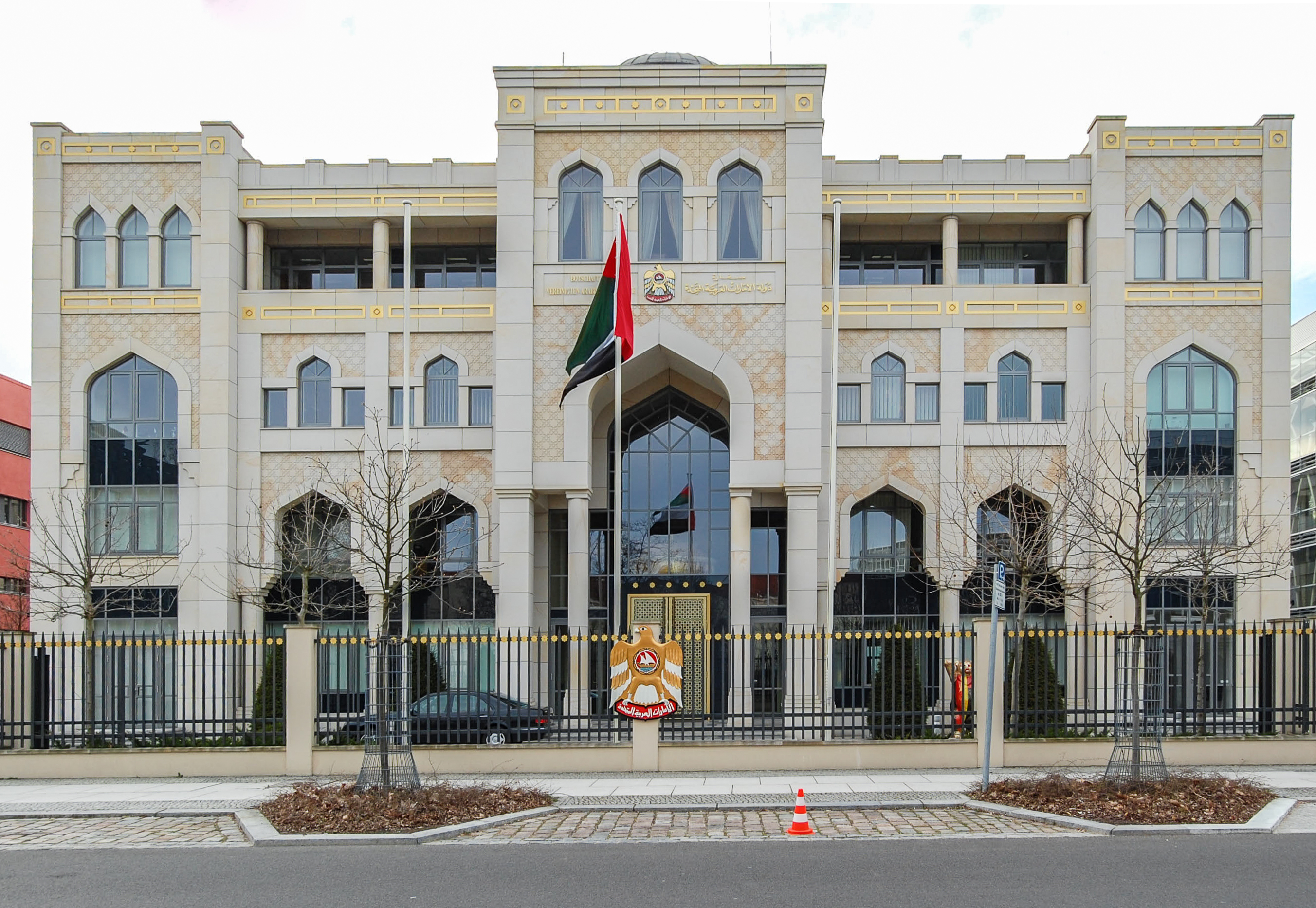
UAE Embassy in Berlin

- Germany has an embassy in Abu Dhabi and a consulate general in Dubai.
- The UAE has an embassy in Berlin and consulates general in Bonn and Munich.

== See also ==
- Foreign relations of Germany
- Foreign relations of the United Arab Emirates
