= South Korea–United Arab Emirates relations =

- South Korea: United Arab Emirates

South Korea–United Arab Emirates relations are the bilateral relations between South Korea and United Arab Emirates. Since establishing diplomatic ties in June of 1980, Korea and the UAE have continued cooperation in various fields, including energy, construction, defense, and culture. As of 2023, the UAE is Korea's 14th trading partner.

On May 28, 2024, the President of the United Arab Emirates Mohamed bin Zayed Al Nahyan paid a state visit to South Korea at the invitation of President Yoon Suk Yeol. This is the first time a UAE president has visited Korea.

== Economic cooperations ==
"The cooperation between our countries has evolved from developing plants and oil fields into that of a special strategic partnership, exemplified by the Barakah Nuclear Power Plant... We will provide support so that the seeds of cooperation can grow."

— Cheong In-kyo, the Minister of Trade, Industry and Energy

In 2009, a consortium led by Korea Electric Power Corporation signed a contract worth $20 billion to export nuclear reactors to Barakah, 270 km west of Abu Dhabi. This project is South Korea's first commercial nuclear reactor export.

== See also ==
- Foreign relations of South Korea
- Foreign relations of United Arab Emirates
