= Serbia–United Arab Emirates relations =

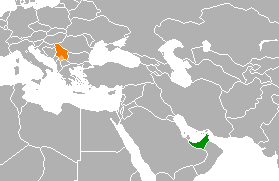

- United Arab Emirates: Serbia

Serbia and the United Arab Emirates maintain diplomatic relations established between SFR Yugoslavia and United Arab Emirates in 1971. From 1971 to 2006, United Arab Emirates maintained relations with the Socialist Federal Republic of Yugoslavia (SFRY) and the Federal Republic of Yugoslavia (FRY) (later Serbia and Montenegro), of which Serbia is considered shared (SFRY) or sole (FRY) legal successor.

== Economic relations ==
Serbia and the United Arab Emirates have developed strong economic ties in the last decade, with significant investments flowing from the UAE into Serbia, particularly in high-profile projects like the Belgrade Waterfront and Air Serbia. The Belgrade Waterfront is a flagship $3.5 billion mixed-use development urban development project in Belgrade: it covers 177 hectares along the Sava River, aiming to transform a neglected area into a modern urban hub with 10 thousand residential units, luxury hotels (such as Saint Regis), the largest shopping mall in Southeast Europe, and the 180-meter Belgrade Tower, the tallest building in the region.

Air Serbia, national flag carrier and largest airline of Serbia was another key pillar of Serbia-UAE economic relations, with the UAE's Etihad Airways playing a pivotal role in its restructuring. In 2013, Etihad acquired a 49% stake in Jat Airways, which was rebranded as Air Serbia. The Serbian government retained 51% and majority control of the supervisory board. Etihad also secured management rights for five years, aiming to turn around the struggling carrier. Partnership ended in 2023.

Emirati telecommunication company Etisalat and is a major player on Serbian market, having acquired Yettel in 2024, a mobile and fixed telephony operator as well as internet and cable television/IPTV provider.

== Resident diplomatic missions ==
- Serbia has an embassy in Abu Dhabi.
- United Arab Emirates has an embassy in Belgrade.

== See also ==
- Foreign relations of Serbia
- Foreign relations of the United Arab Emirates
