= List of ambassadors of China to the United Arab Emirates =

The ambassador of China to the United Arab Emirates is the official representative of the People's Republic of China to the United Arab Emirates.

== List of representatives ==
| Name (English) | Name (Chinese) | Tenure begins | Tenure ends | Note |
|---|---|---|---|---|
| Hu Changlin | 胡昌林 | April 1985 | February 1989 | |
| Huang Zhen | 黄振 | March 1989 | September 1991 | |
| Liu Baolai | 刘宝莱 | October 1991 | November 1995 | |
| Hua Liming | 华黎明 | December 1995 | March 1998 | |
| Zhu Dacheng | 朱达成 | April 1998 | June 2001 | |
| Zhang Zhijun | 张志军 | August 2001 | October 2006 | |
| Gao Yusheng | 高育生 | October 2006 | February 2012 | |
| Huang Jiemin | 黄杰民 | March 2012 | November 2014 | |
| Chang Hua | 常华 | December 2014 | August 2016 | |
| Ni Jian | 倪坚 | November 2016 | April 2022 | |
| Zhang Yiming | 张益明 | May 2022 | | |

== See also ==
- China–United Arab Emirates relations
