= Mexico–United Arab Emirates relations =

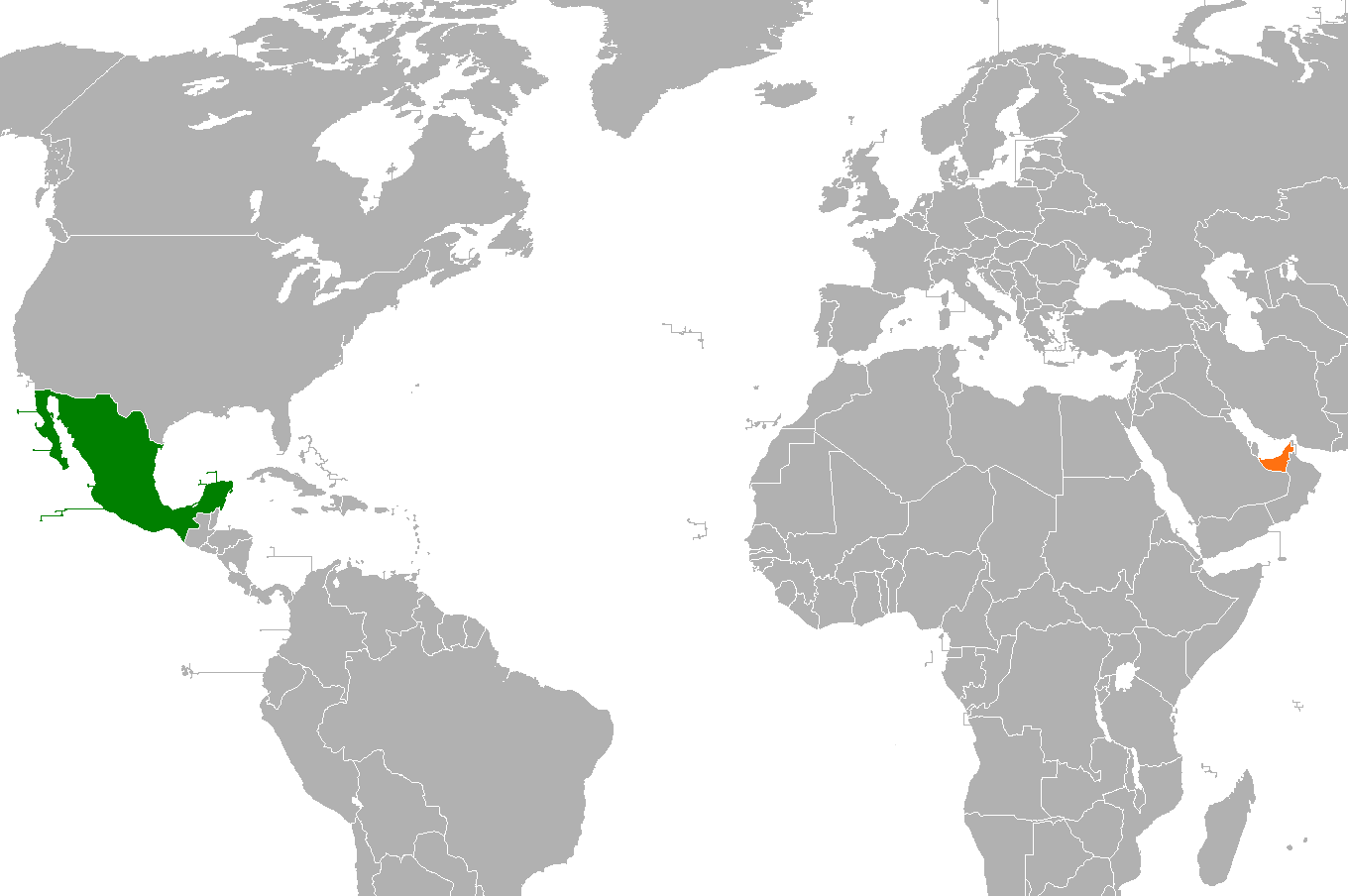

- Mexico: United Arab Emirates

The nations of Mexico and the United Arab Emirates established diplomatic relations in 1975. Both nations are members of the United Nations.

== History ==
Mexico and the United Arab Emirates (UAE) established diplomatic relations on 12 September 1975. For the first three decades, Mexico was accredited to the UAE from its embassy in Beirut, Lebanon while the UAE was accredited to Mexico from its embassy in Washington, D.C., United States.

In 2008, Mexico opened a consulate-general in Dubai to promote trade and cultural cooperation between the two nations. In 2010, the UAE opened an embassy in Mexico City and in return, Mexico opened an embassy in Abu Dhabi in 2012 and closed its consulate in Dubai.

Since the establishment of resident diplomatic missions, both nations have increased mutual international cooperation, cultural events, trade and high level visits. Foreign ministers of both nations have repeatedly visited each other's nation and have signed several bilateral agreements including improved cooperation in the energy sector.

In April 2014, Emirati Vice President and Prime Minister Mohammed bin Rashid Al Maktoum paid an official visit to Mexico. It was the first visit ever by a ruling Emirati Prime Minister. In January 2016 Mexican President Enrique Peña Nieto paid an official visit to the UAE. During President Peña Nieto's visit, both nations signed 13 agreements and memorandums.

In March 2022, Mexican Foreign Minister Marcelo Ebrard paid a visit to Abu Dhabi where he held bilateral, cultural and trade discussions and promoted investment opportunities in Mexico. Ebrard would later travel to Dubai and attend the World Government Summit. In 2024, Mexican Foreign Undersecretary María Teresa Mercado Pérez travelled to Abu Dhabi and met with the Minister of State, Ahmed Ali Al Sayegh and discussed bilateral cooperation in strategic sectors such as energy, agriculture, science and technological innovation, climate change, education and culture. Foreign Undersecretary Mercado Pérez also participated in the inauguration of an exhibition of five Mexican archaeological pieces at the Louvre Abu Dhabi.

== High-level visits ==
High-level visits from Mexico to the United Arab Emirates

- Foreign Undersecretary Lourdes Aranda (2007)
- Foreign Minister Patricia Espinosa (2010)
- Foreign Minister José Antonio Meade (2014)
- Foreign Undersecretary Carlos de Icaza (2014)
- President Enrique Peña Nieto (2016)
- Foreign Undersecretary Martha Delgado Peralta (2019)
- Foreign Minister Marcelo Ebrard (2022)
- Foreign Undersecretary María Teresa Mercado Pérez (2024)

High-level visits from the United Arab Emirates to Mexico

- Foreign Minister Abdullah bin Zayed Al Nahyan (2009, 2010, 2019)
- Vice President and Prime Minister Mohammed bin Rashid Al Maktoum (2014)

== Bilateral agreements ==
Both nations have signed several bilateral agreements such as an Agreement on Air Services (2012); Agreement to Avoid Double Taxation and Prevent Tax Evasion in Income Tax Matters and its Protocol (2012); Memorandum of Understanding for the Establishment of Political Consultations on Issues of Mutual Interest (2012); Memorandum of Understanding on mutual visa Exemption for Holders of Diplomatic, Official and Private Passports (2012); Agreement on the Promotion and Protection of Investments (2016); Agreement on Tourism Cooperation (2016); Memorandum of Understanding of Cooperation in Clean Energy (2016); Memorandum of Understanding of Cooperation in the Energy Sector (2016); Memorandum of Understanding of Cultural Cooperation (2016); Memorandum of Understanding in Educational and Scientific Cooperation (2016); Memorandum of Understanding of Cooperation between Pemex and the Abu Dhabi National Oil Company (2016); Memorandum of Understanding between the Bank for Foreign Trade of Mexico (Bancomext) and the Dubai Economic Council (2016); Memorandum of Understanding for Cooperation and Comprehensive Partnership (2023); and a Memorandum of Understanding on Cooperation in Agricultural, Aquaculture and Fishery Products and Food Security (2023).

== Transportation ==
The airline Emirates provides flights between Dubai and Mexico City with a stopover in Barcelona.

== Trade relations ==
In 2023, two-way trade between both nations totaled US$1.2 billion. Mexico's main exports to the UAE include: motor cars and other vehicles, tubes and pipes of iron or steel, aluminum, telephones and mobile phones, machinery, home appliances, fruits and nuts, diary based products, alcohol, plastic, chemical based products, and minerals. The UAE's main exports to Mexico include: unwrought aluminum, iron and steel, machinery and parts, chemical based products, petroleum, parts and accessories for motor vehicles, articles of jewelry, and seafood. Mexican multinational companies Cemex and KidZania operate in the UAE.

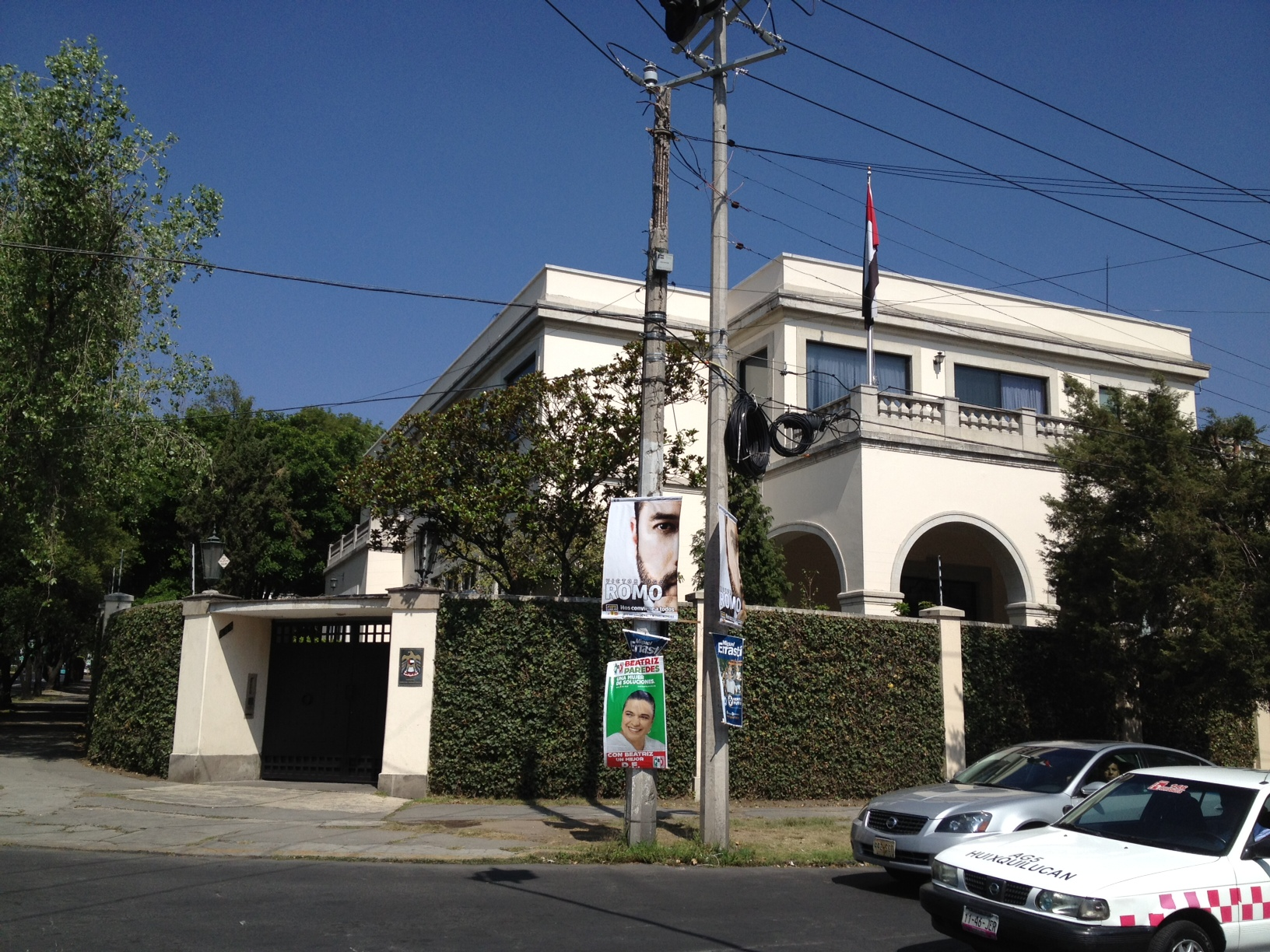
Embassy of the UAE in Mexico City

== Resident diplomatic missions ==
- Mexico has an embassy in Abu Dhabi
- United Arab Emirates has an embassy in Mexico City.

== See also ==
- Expatriates in the United Arab Emirates
