= China–United Arab Emirates relations =

- China: United Arab Emirates

Diplomatic mission
- Embassy of China, Abu Dhabi: Embassy of the United Arab Emirates, Beijing

The People's Republic of China and the United Arab Emirates established diplomatic relations in 1984. The UAE maintains an embassy in Beijing and a consulate-general in Hong Kong while China has an embassy in Abu Dhabi and consulate-general in Dubai. The two countries signed a strategic partnership agreement in 2012. The UAE and China have maintained strong relations, with significant cooperation across economic, political and cultural aspects.

== Background ==
The relations between the two have historically been mounted on high-level trade. In 2007, China-UAE bilateral trade scaled new highs, exceeding $19.4 billion and indicating a growth rate of 41 percent. There are also some 2,000 Chinese firms operating in the UAE and a large community of Chinese in the United Arab Emirates who are involved primarily in the construction sector. Additionally, the UAE is China's second largest trading partner in the Persian Gulf region and the largest in terms of buying Chinese products.

According to Wen Jiabao, "the UAE is one of China's most important economic partners in the Persian Gulf region, serving as a transfer center for Chinese products to the Middle East and African markets." He also encouraged Emirati businesses to invest in China and Chinese companies to invest in the UAE, noting that the expansion of bilateral cooperation facilitates the fundamental interests of both nations.

During a visit to China in 2010, UAE Minister of Foreign Trade Sheikha Lubna Al Qasimi expressed that the UAE was keen on strengthening its strategic partnership with China and developing commercial and investment cooperation. In 2012, China and UAE signed a strategic partnership agreement.

Despite pressure from the US, Abu Dhabi's cooperation with China over artificial intelligence and upgradation of hi-tech industries continued. Analysts were warning that strengthening relations between the UAE and Beijing, citing the May 2024 visit of Mohamed bin Zayed Al Nahyan to China, were “not irreversible” and may cause issues with the US. In the meeting, UAE-China vowed on closer cooperation in areas including artificial intelligence. The US and China have most intensive competition in the areas on which Abu Dhabi and Beijing were vowing cooperation, including trade and investment, science and technology, and others. That was becoming an increasing concern for Washington. In May 2024, US restricted the UAE's G42 to reduce its association with China. In 2023, the US also stopped the Emirati plans to participate in China's 2026 Chang’e-7 moon mission, considering the US technology transfer restrictions.

In July 2024, China and the United Arab Emirates are holding joint air force training exercise, dubbed Falcon Shield, in the northwest Xinjiang province of China. In 2022, The Emirati Defense Ministry announced a deal with the China National Aero-Technology Import & Export for the purchase of 12 L-15 light attack planes. In 2022, China was the UAE's largest trading partner, while the UAE was China's biggest partner in the Arab world.

== Ventures ==
In May 2010, both sides inked a memorandum of understanding with the aim of pushing forward cooperation in railway construction. Under the document, signed by Liu Zhijun and Sheikh Hamdan bin Mubarak Al Nahyan, the two sides will launch extensive cooperation in such areas as railway development, engineering construction, technical exchanges and personnel training.

== Diplomatic visits ==
In July 2018, Chinese Communist Party general secretary Xi Jinping visited UAE. Xi meets Prime Minister Sheikh Mohammed bin Rashid Al Maktoum and Crown Prince of Abu Dhabi Sheikh Mohammed bin Zayed Al Nahyan in Abu Dhabi. Xi was awarded Order of Zayed by President Sheikh Khalifa bin Zayed Al Nahyan.

== Belt and Road initiative ==
UAE joined the Belt and Road Initiative (BRI) in 2018.

China and the UAE signed $3.4 billion worth of deals as part of China's Belt and Road Initiative. The initiative aims to use the Port of Jebel Ali to ship Chinese products to the world using the UAE's position as both sea and land trading hub. Dubai's Rashid Al Maktoum Solar Park is intended as a flagship BRI renewable project in the Middle East.

== Immigration ==
There are over 180,000 people of Chinese origin living in the UAE.

== Sovereignty issues ==
The United Arab Emirates follows the one China principle, and recognizes government of the People's Republic of China as the sole legal government representing the whole of China and Taiwan as "an inalienable part" of China. The UAE also supports all efforts by the PRC to "achieve national reunification" and opposes Taiwan independence.

In July 2019, UN ambassadors of 37 countries, including UAE, Qatar, Bahrain and Saudi Arabia, signed a joint letter to the UNHRC defending China's treatment of Uyghurs in the Xinjiang region.

In June 2020, UAE was one of 53 countries that backed the Hong Kong national security law at the United Nations.

== Resident diplomatic missions ==
- China has an embassy in Abu Dhabi and a consulate-general in Dubai.
- United Arab Emirates has an embassy in Beijing and a consulate-general in Hong Kong.

== See also ==
- Taiwan–United Arab Emirates relations

== Bibliography ==
- Cardenal, Juan Pablo; Araújo, Heriberto (2011). La silenciosa conquista china (in Spanish). Barcelona: Crítica. pp. 79–84. ISBN 9788498922578.
