= Al Qabil, Al Buraimi =

Al-Qabil ٱلْقَابِل
- Village
- Location in Oman Al-Qabil (Persian Gulf)
- Coordinates: 23°56′51″N 55°49′11″E
- Country: Oman
- Region: Al-Buraimi
- Time zone: UTC+4 (Oman Standard Time)

Al-Qābil (Arabic: ٱلْقَابِل) is a village in Al Buraimi Governorate (formerly Ad Dhahirah Region), in northwestern Oman. A small agricultural village, Al Qabil lies on Highway 21 across the border from Al Ain in the United Arab Emirates. The village lies south of Mazyad and Al-Zahir, and west of Hisn Mazyad. Described as a "prosperous market village", Al-Qabil lies at a curve in the road before "descending into the Sa'dah basin from the west". The village is said to contain populations of Al Bu-Shamis group of the Na'im who moved into the village from across the border with the Emirates. Wadi Sarin is said to flow nearby.

== See also ==
- Al-Buraimi
- Hamasah
- Mahdah
- Sunaynah
