= Bakhabi =

- Village
- Location in Oman
- Coordinates: 23°27′N 56°12′E
- Country: Oman
- Region: Ad Dhahirah Region
- Time zone: UTC+4 (Oman Standard Time)

Bakhabi is a village in Ad Dhahirah Region, in northeastern Oman. It lies along Highway 21 opposite Abu Silah, north of Mazim.
