= Khuwayr Kadra' =

- Location in Oman
- Coordinates: 22°37′57″N 55°54′28″E
- Country: Oman
- Governorate: Ad Dhahirah Governorate
- Province: Ibri Province

Khuwayr Kadra' or Tawi al Khuwayr is a community in Ibri Province, Ad Dhahirah Governorate, Oman.
