= Hayy Al-Nahdha, Ibri =

Hayy Al-Nahdha حي النهضة Hayy Al-Nahdha
- Neighborhood
- Location in Ibri
- Coordinates: 23°12′29.3″N 56°28′19.1″E
- Country: Oman
- Region: Ad Dhahirah
- City: Ibri
- Time zone: UTC+4 (Oman Standard Time)

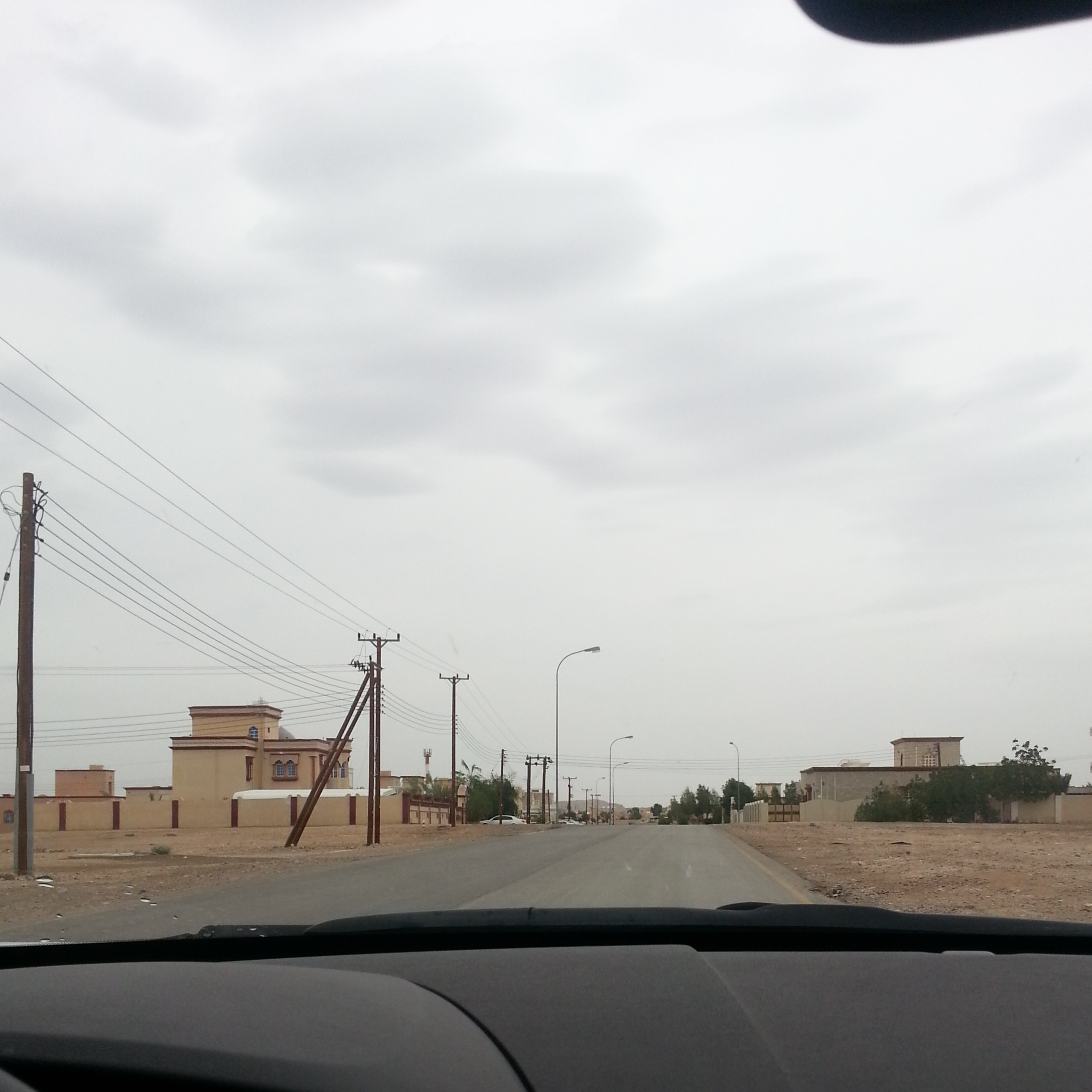
picture from Hayy Al-Nahdha

Hayy Al-Nahdha is a neighborhood in Ibri, located in the Al-Dhahira Governorate, approximately 3 km from the city center.

== Location ==
It is near the Al-Dhahira Police Headquarters.

== Climate ==
The weather in Hayy Al-Nahdha is usually hot and dry, with summer temperatures ranging from 35 to 55°C (95 to 131°F). In contrast, from December to February, the weather is relatively cooler, with temperatures ranging from 5 to 25°C (41 to 77°F).

== Education ==
The city has Khadra' Ibri School and the Al-Wafa Center for the Rehabilitation of Disabled Children.

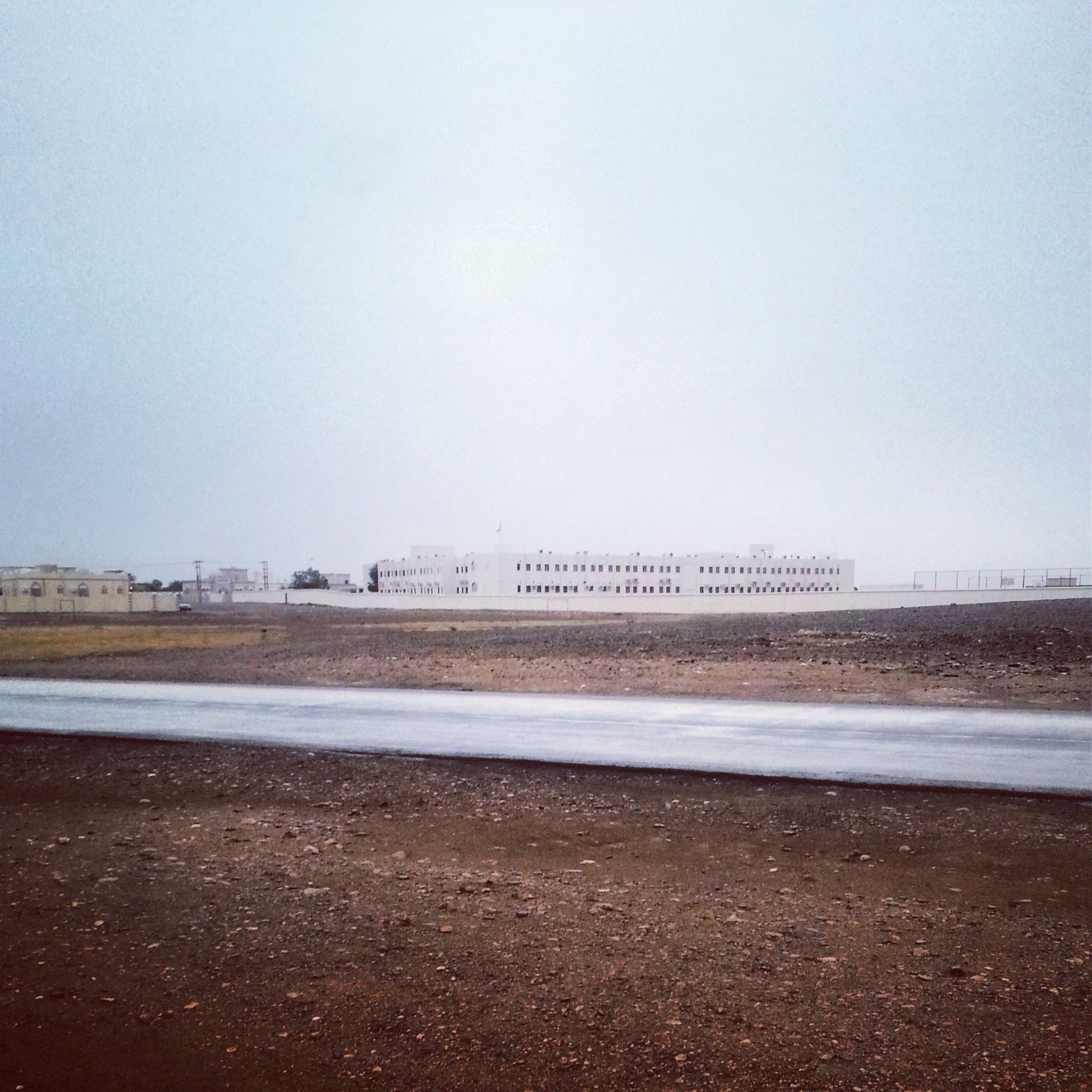
picture for "Khadra' Ibri School"
