= Jizzi Valley =

Region of Al Buraimi Governorate, Oman

The Jizzi Valley is a sub-region located in Al Buraimi Governorate and part of it in Sohar Governorate. It is a mountainous area.

== Naming ==
It is said that Al Jizzi valley was named after the village of Al Zaji (or Az-Ziji), which is located in the middle of Al Jizzi valley, along with the neighboring villages today.

== Villages ==
The villages affiliated with Al Jizzi valley are divided, some belonging to Al Buraimi Governorate and others to Sohar Governorate:

- Wasit – considered the capital of the land of Al Hajar
- Al Huwaylat
- Sahban
- Al Farfar
- Al Khan
- Al Khatwa
- Al Sahila
- Al Thaqba
- Al Yass
- Al Dhahran
- Al Arja
- Bayda
- Rahab
- Al Rabi
- Al Jahili
- Al Hayl
- Katna
- Misyal Al Sidr
- Khashisha Al Milh
- Al Aqq valley
- Al Uwayna valley
- Al Asil valley
- Al Malina
- Al Ubayla
- Al Jil
- Al Daqiq
- Huwaylat Ghala, and other small villages.

Among the tributary valleys at the head of the valley are:

- Sahban valley
- Qasid valley
- Katna valley
- Wasit valley
- Al Kamar valley
- Al Sahi valley
- Al Thajir valley
- As for the lower part of the valley, it belongs to Sohar Governorate, where Al Jizzi valley Dam is located.

Tributary valleys in this section include:

- Al Farfar valley
- Hansi valley
- Al Aqq valley
- Al Hayl Al Ada valley
- Al Thaqba valley
- Al Yass valley

Among the most important springs in Al Jizzi valley:

- The famous Ain Sahban, located specifically in Sahban.
- It is a beautiful oasis distinguished by its blue color and has many benefits.
- Reaching it is somewhat difficult for some people due to its location in a mountainous area.
- There is also the Sultan Qaboos Mosque in it.
