= As Subaykhi =

- Village
- Location in Oman
- Coordinates: 23°19′N 56°19′E
- Country: Oman
- Region: Ad Dhahirah Region
- Time zone: UTC+4 (Oman Standard Time)

As Subaykhi is a village in Ad Dhahirah Region, in northeastern Oman. The village is located just off Highway 21, south of Mazim and about 20 miles northwest of Ibri. Over half of the village is covered in green trees and agricultural land. A hill area to the south of the village is known as Jebel Subaykhi. The central government have discouraged Iqtabi families from moving into As Subaykhi. In the late 1970s, it was reported that semi- nomads were building more permanent structures, adjacent to the village.
