= Jebel Ghawil =

Jebel Ghawil جَبَل غَوِيْل (in Arabic)
- Village and mountain
- Location in Oman
- Coordinates: 24°34′N 56°01′E
- Country: Oman
- Region: Al Buraimi Governorate
- Time zone: UTC+4 (Oman Standard Time)

Jebel Ghawil (Arabic: جَبَل غَوِيْل, romanized: Jabal Ġawīl) is a village and a mountain in Al Buraimi Governorate, in northwestern Oman. The village lies northwest of Abud.

== Geology ==
Geologically Jebel Ghawil constitutes a formation with Jebel Suweini. It consists of Triassic limestone, which is said to be "underlain by a thick sequence of pillow lavas, which are partly imbricated with cherts". There are three sills intruded into basaltic lavas and tuffs dated to the late Triassic and its sills reportedly give K-Ar ages on separated biotites of 93-4 ±4Ma.
