= Mazim =

- Village
- Location in Oman
- Coordinates: 23°24′N 56°17′E
- Country: Oman
- Region: Ad Dhahirah Region
- Time zone: UTC+4 (Oman Standard Time)

Mazim is a village in Ad Dhahirah Region, in northeastern Oman. The village lies southeast of Abu Silah and northwest of As Subaykhi along Highway 21, which connects the village to Ibri, the district capital. The village contains a large green area of trees to the west of the main road entering the village. The 1917 Gazetteer of Arabia describes Mazim as being a hamlet, located about 25 miles northwest of Ibri, and being fortified with walls. Tanker filler stations have been proposed in Mazim.

To the north of the village is the hamlet of Masharub.

Mazim was a small settlement of Baluchis allied and intermarried with the Bani Qitab and It consisted of about three hundred houses.
