= Oman–United Arab Emirates relations =

- Oman: United Arab Emirates

Diplomatic mission
- Embassy of Oman, Abu Dhabi: Embassy of the United Arab Emirates, Muscat

Oman–United Arab Emirates relations have been described by both countries as a special relationship, with both countries' populations sharing common heritage, culture, and fraternal ties that precede the formation of their respective modern states.

The United Arab Emirates (UAE) has an embassy in Muscat, while Oman has an embassy in Abu Dhabi and a consulate-general in Dubai. Both countries are part of Eastern Arabia and the Middle East region and share close cultural ties. Oman and the UAE also share a long border with each other, including two exclaves of Oman accessible on land only through the UAE, and also border the Gulf of Oman. Both countries are members of the Arab League, the Organisation of Islamic Cooperation and the Gulf Cooperation Council.

== History ==
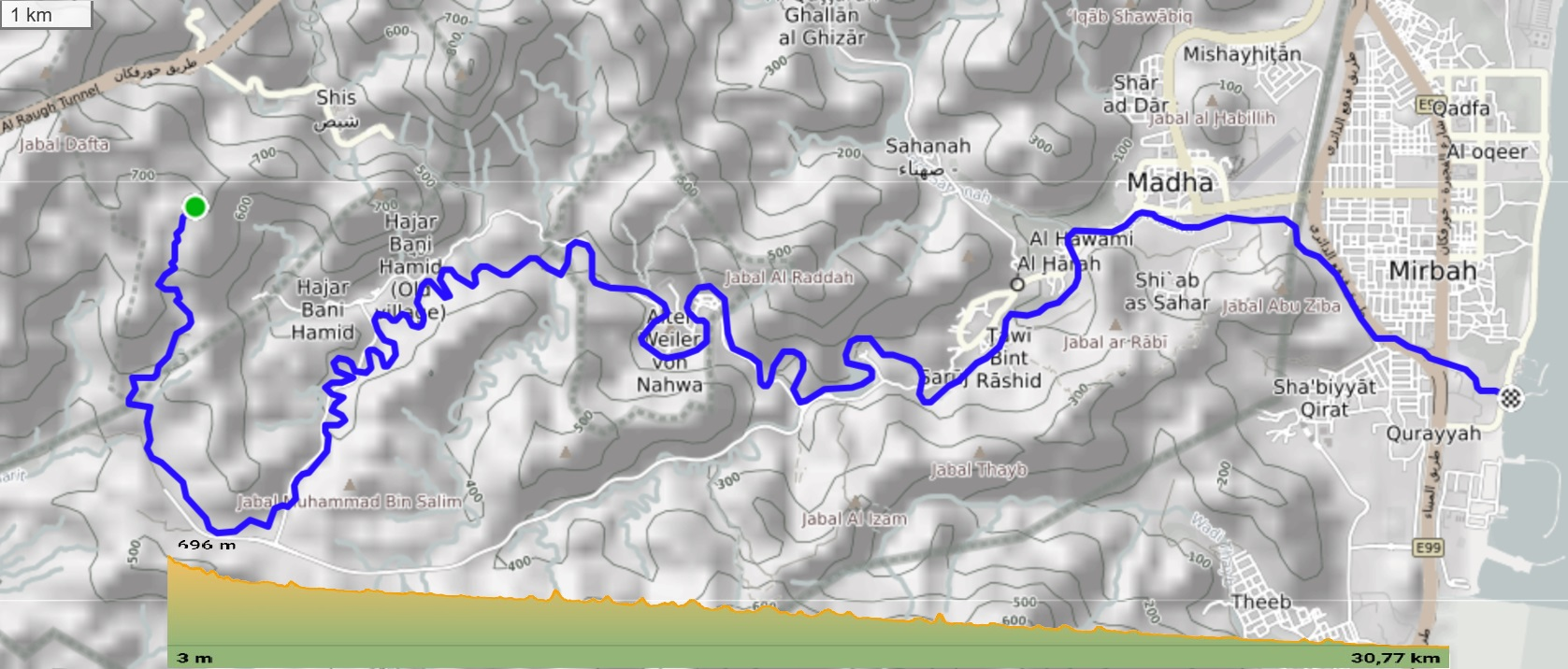
Map of Wadi Madha, a wadi that passes between Fujairah, Madha, an enclave of Oman, and Nahwa, a second order enclave of UAE.

=== Buraimi dispute (1952 - 1955) ===
The Buraimi dispute was a series of covert attempts by Saudi Arabia to influence the region of Al Buraimi and parts of Al Ain which resulted in an armed conflict and a territorial dispute between Saudi Arabia on one side and Oman and the Trucial States on the other. Sheikh Zayed bin Sultan Al Nahyan was supported by Sultan Said bin Taimur during the dispute. The dispute eventually culminated with Saudi surrender after the intervention of the Trucial Oman Scouts.

=== Dhofar War (1963 - 1976) ===
During the Dhofar War in Oman, the UAE sent troops to Oman and provided financial aid to Sultan Qaboos bin Said.

=== Iran nuclear program ===
In January 2011, Oman stated that they have discovered an alleged spy network operated by the United Arab Emirates that targeted its government and military. UAE denied any involvement and expressed willingness to cooperate with any investigation. A number of Omani citizens were arrested, some of whom worked in the government. Divisions between the two countries regarding Iran's nuclear ambitions were seen by analysts as a possible cause for the espionage. Oman helped establish back channels between Iran and the United States which resulted in the 2015 Joint Comprehensive Plan of Action. Kuwait's Sheikh Sabah Al Sabah mediated in the dispute after the spying accusation.

In 2019, Oman announced another alleged Emirati spying cell, with 5 Emiratis and 2 Omani citizens being put on trial for espionage. Omani Foreign Minister Yousuf bin Alawi remarked on the arrest during a lecture by saying “these things happen between neighbours”.

=== 2018 land purchase restriction ===
In 2018 there were regional tensions between the countries following Qaboos' order to restrict non-Omani citizens' ownership of agricultural land and real estate in Oman. The restriction followed multiple purchases by Emirati citizens. The restrictions were centered on strategic areas around the UAE, including the Musandam Peninsula.

Tribes in Musandam have cultural, family and economic link with the surrounding Emirates and show differences with the Omani mainland in terms of religion with the presence of Sunni and Shia communities beyond the predominant Ibadi sect in Oman. The Shihuh tribe, who inhabit areas in the northern emirates and in Musandam, is spread across both Oman and UAE. Oman has detained tens of members of the tribe on national security reasons.

== Hafeet Rail ==
In 2022, a joint venture to link the two countries by rail was announced. On April 23, 2024, the rail was renamed Hafeet Rail in reference to Jebel Hafeet, which lies between both Oman and UAE. The rail will connect the Etihad Rail at the Emirati city of Al Ain with Omani city of Sohar.

== Diplomatic visits ==
On 29 September 2022, President Sheikh Mohamed bin Zayed visited Muscat. On 22 April 2024, Sultan Haitham bin Tariq visited Abu Dhabi and both countries signed agreements worth $35 billion. These agreements were in different sectors, such as energy and transportation.

== See also ==
- Omanis in the United Arab Emirates
- Oman–United Arab Emirates border
