= Ash Shuwayhah =

- Village
- Location in Oman
- Coordinates: 24°38′N 56°05′E
- Country: Oman
- Region: Al Buraimi Governorate
- Time zone: UTC+4 (Oman Standard Time)

Ash Shuwayhah is a village in Al Buraimi Governorate, in northeastern Oman. It lies north of Abud.
