= Abud, Oman =

Aljwayef دار بني كعب الجويف
- Village
- Location in Oman
- Coordinates: 24°33′N 56°06′E
- Country: Oman
- Region: Al Buraimi Governorate
- Time zone: UTC+4 (Oman Standard Time)

Abud or Hayl is a village in Al Buraimi Governorate, in northeastern Oman.The village lies south of Ash Shuwayhah. Nearby is a small populated place called Al Juwayf.
