= Hamasa =

Hamasa حَمَاسَة
- Town
- Location in Oman
- Coordinates: 24°14′N 55°46′E
- Country: Oman
- Governorate: Al Buraimi
- Time zone: UTC+4 (+4)

Hamasa (Arabic: حَمَاسَة, romanized: Ḥamāsah) is an area in the Buraimi area in Oman on the Oman–United Arab Emirates border. Hamasa, for the period of 200 years, was the capital of the Buraimi district.

== History ==
Being part of the region of Tawam or Al-Buraimi Oasis, Hamasa's history dates back thousands of years, and in 2015 was the site of archaeological investigations undertaken by Sultan Qaboos University, the Omani Ministry of Heritage & Culture and Zayed University. It was described by the explorer Wilfred Thesiger as being involved in the slave trade when he visited in the 1940s.

== Al Kandaq Fort ==
The Al Kandaq Fort is an ancient fort located in Hamasa. The fort is believed to have been built in the pre-Islamic era. It is being maintained by the government since 1994. The fort is a local tourist attraction. It is situated just 755m away from the Hamasa border crossing station connecting Al Buraimi to Al Ain.

== Role in the Buraimi dispute ==
On 31 August 1952, Hamasa was occupied by a group of 80 Saudi guards led by the Saudi Emir of Ras Tanura, Turki bin Abdullah Al Otaishan as part of the Saudi's attempts to claim Buraimi as the eastern province of Saudi Arabia.The British initially responded with diplomacy and formality and reached a Standstill agreement in October 1952 and negotiations to take place in Geneva . In 1955, proceedings had taken place in Geneva only to collapse when the British arbitrator, Sir Reader Bullard, objected to Saudi Arabian attempts to influence the tribunal and withdrew – one of the two judges to resign, the other being the Belgian President.

Given these breaches of the agreement, the British government decided to unilaterally abrogate the Standstill Agreement and take the oasis on 25 October 1955.

On 25 October, the Trucial Oman Levies quickly took the oasis and captured all fifteen of the Saudi contingent under the Saudi Emir Bin Nami.

Following the conflict, the British decided to split the territory of Buraimi Oasis, ceding the areas under the Na'im and Al Bu Shamis, Buraimi and Hamasa, to Oman and the territory under Sheikh Zayed, including the village of Al Ain, to Abu Dhabi.

The dispute continued to rumble on for many years to come until settled in 1974 by an agreement, known as the Treaty of Jeddah, between Sheikh Zayed (then President of the UAE) and Faisal of Saudi Arabia .

== See also ==
- Al-Buraimi
- Mahdah
- Sunaynah
