= Abu Silah =

- Village
- Location in Oman
- Coordinates: 23°26′N 56°14′E
- Country: Oman
- Region: Ad Dhahirah Region
- Time zone: UTC+4 (Oman Standard Time)

Abu Silah is a village in Ad Dhahirah Region, in northeastern Oman. The hamlets of Qa`idi and Jufayf are in very close proximity. The village lies along the Muscat Sur Highway (Highway 21) north by road from Mazim. There is also a Wadi Silah flowing through the Ad Dhahirah Region.
