= Sultan Qaboos Grand Mosque, Al-Buraimi =

Mosque in Al-Buraimi, Oman

Sultan Qaboos Grand Mosque
- جَامِع ٱلسُّلْطَان قَابُوْس
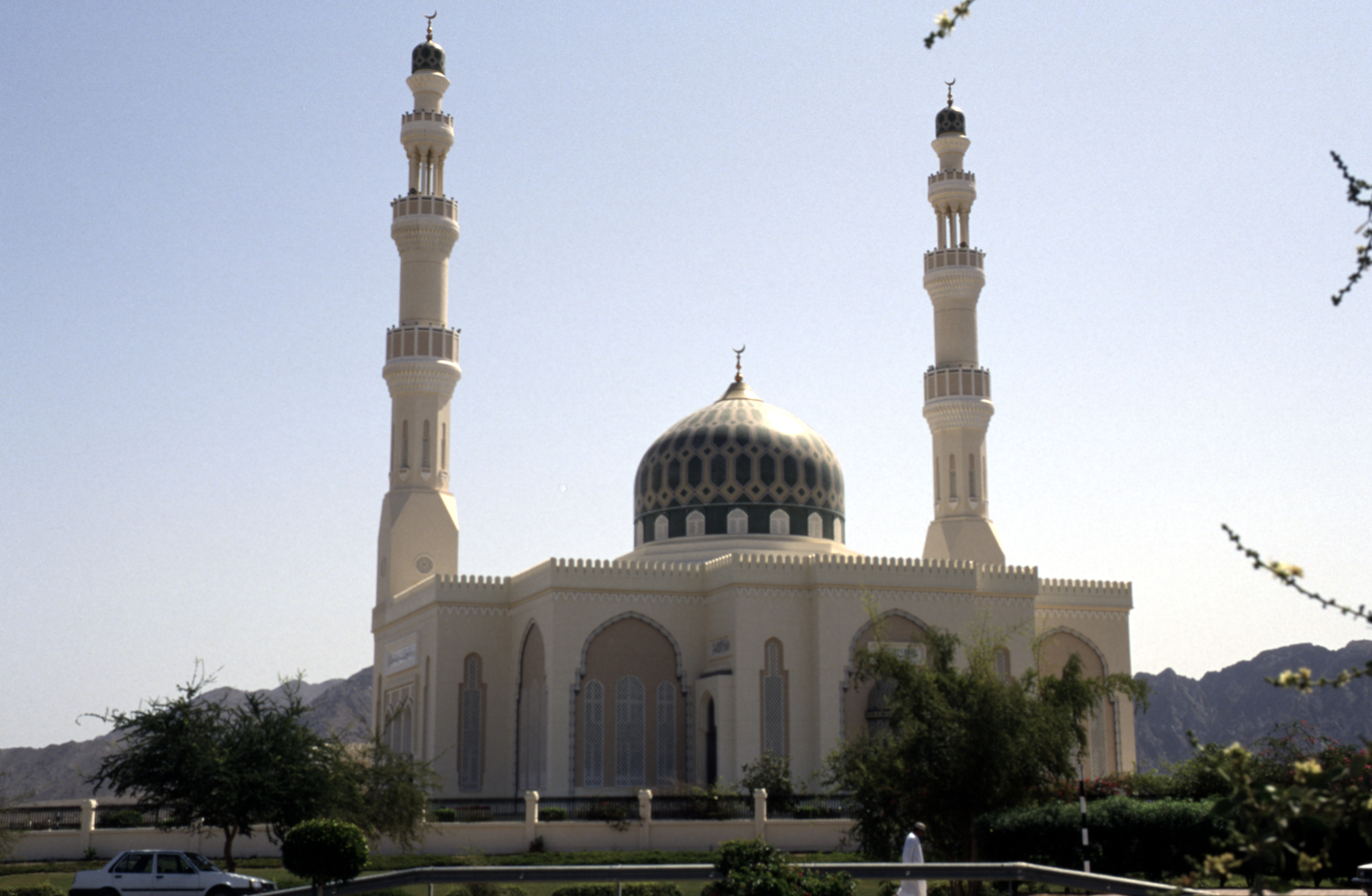
- The mosque in 2001

- Location of the mosque in Oman Sultan Qaboos Grand Mosque, Al-Buraimi (Middle East) Sultan Qaboos Grand Mosque, Al-Buraimi (West and Central Asia)

Religion
- Affiliation: Islam
- Ecclesiastical or organizational status: Friday mosque
- Status: Active

Location
- Location: Al-Buraimi, Al Buraimi Governorate
- Country: Oman
- Interactive map of Sultan Qaboos Grand Mosque
- Coordinates: 24°15′41″N 55°47′04″E

Architecture
- Style: Contemporary Islamic
- Completed: December 1993

Specifications
- Capacity: 2,016 worshipers; 252 Female worshipers
- Dome: 1
- Minaret: 2
- Site area: 189 m^{2} (2,030 sq ft)

The Sultan Qaboos Grand Mosque (Arabic: جَامِع ٱلسُّلْطَان قَابُوْس, romanized: Jāmiʿ As-Sulṭān Qābūs) is a Friday mosque in Al-Buraimi, in the Sultanate of Oman; and the largest mosque in Al-Buraimi.

== Overview ==
The Grand Mosque was opened on 10 December 1993 and is named in honor of the former Sultan of Oman, Qaboos bin Said Al Said. The mosque has an area of 189 square metres (2,030 ft^{2}) and can accommodate 2,016 worshipers, including 252 women.

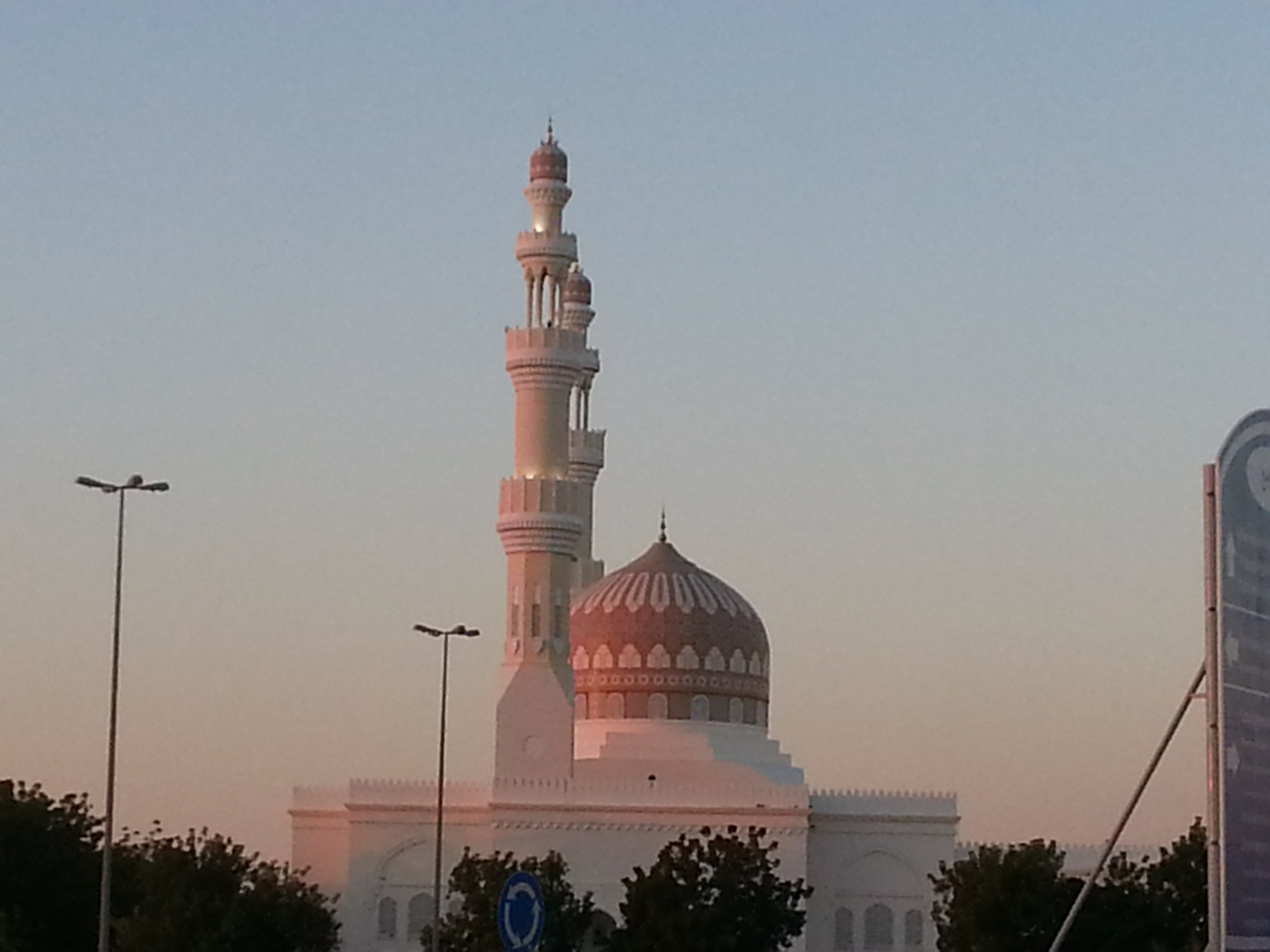

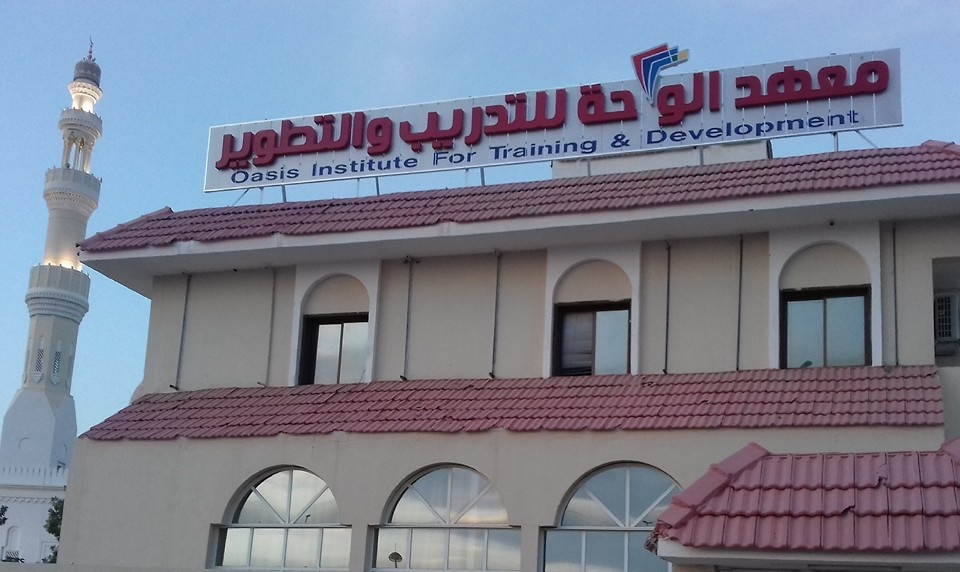
The Oasis Institute for Training and Development, Al-Buraimi, near the Grand Mosque

== See also ==
- Islam in Oman
  - List of mosques in Oman
- Al-Buraimi Oasis
