= Oman–United Arab Emirates border =

International border

The Oman–United Arab Emirates border consists of three non-contiguous sections totalling 609 km (378 mi) in length.

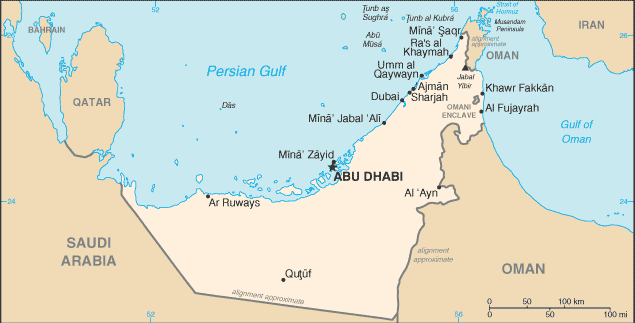
Map of the UAE, with Oman to the east

== Description ==
=== Northern (Musandam) section ===
The northern section of the border divides the Omani exclave of Musandam from the UAE Emirates of Fujairah and Ras Al Khaimah. This peninsula commands the strategic Strait of Hormuz, with the Oman-UAE border consisting of a series of irregular, though roughly horizontal, lines running through mountainous terrain, from the western Persian Gulf coast to the eastern Gulf of Oman coast.

=== Middle (enclaved) section ===
The middle section of the border consists of the Omani enclave of Madha, within which is the UAE counter-enclave of Nahwa, belonging to the Emirate of Sharjah. This territory is the only territory between UAE and Oman which is not lined with any barrier and there is no border crossing checkpoint between Madha, Nahwa, or the rest of the UAE.

=== Southern section ===
The southern, and by far the longest, section of the frontier starts in the north on the Oman Gulf coast, just south of Kalba in the Emirate of Sharjah. It then proceeds inland roughly south-westwards via a series of irregular lines, arcing southwards so as to include Hatta within the UAE. The border then proceeds roughly south-westwards down to the Omani tripoint, save for a piece of Emirati territory south-east of Al-Ain that juts into Oman.

== History ==
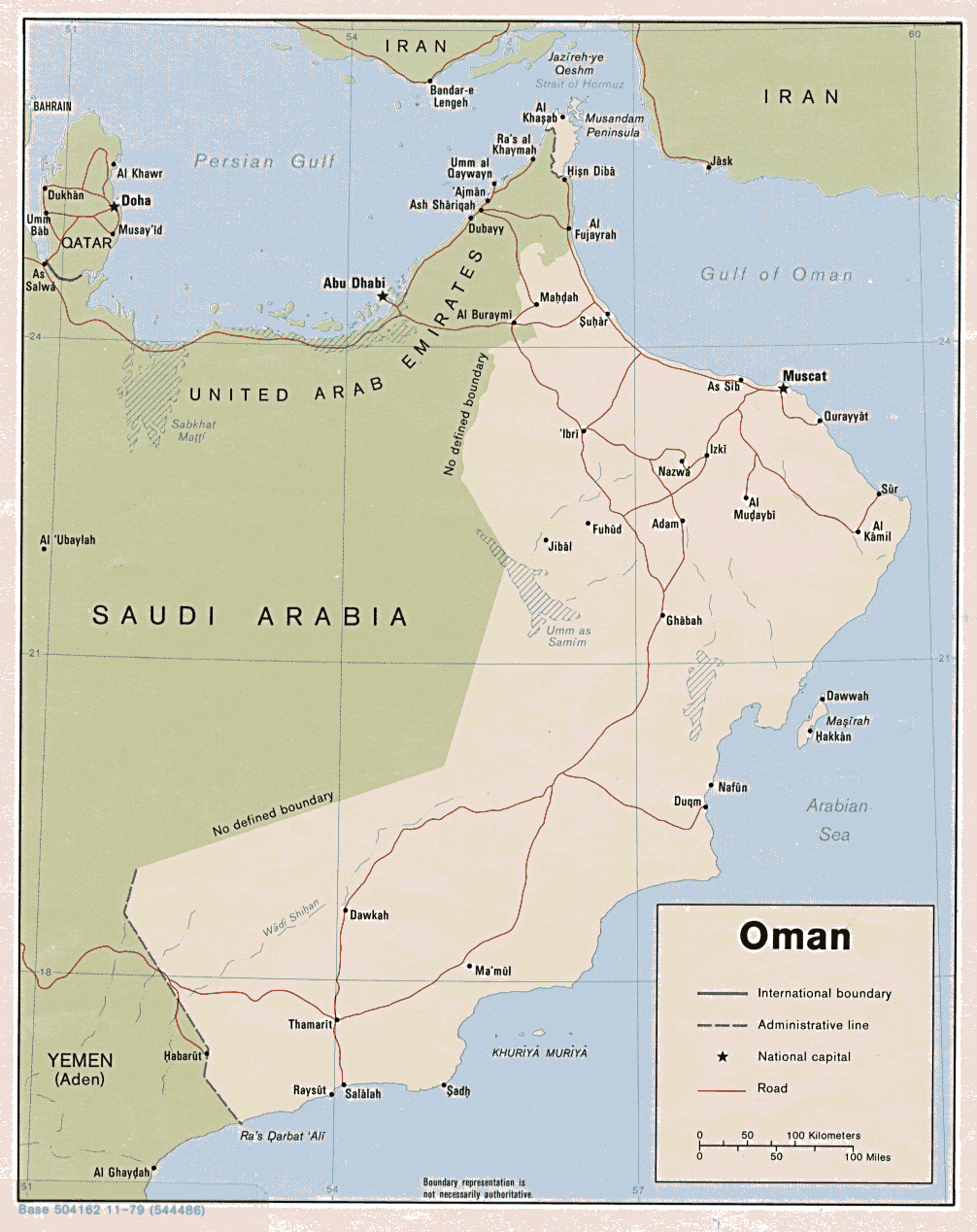
Map of Oman from 1979, showing the UAE border as undefined

During the 19th century, Britain had signed a number of protectorate treaties with seven emirates on what was then known as the 'Pirate Coast', giving rise to the so-called Trucial States. Britain also exercised protectorate control over Oman via its sultan. Boundaries in this part of Arabia remained indistinct; Britain and the Ottoman Empire theoretically divided their realms of influence in Arabia via the so-called 'Blue' and 'Violet lines' in 1913–14, however these agreements were rendered null and void following the collapse of the Ottoman Empire after the First World War.

The enclaves of Madha and Nahwa appear to have arisen in the 1930s-40, following a dispute over the ownership of the area between Oman and the local emirs, which was settled by a vote amongst the village elders. The boundaries of the enclaves were fixed in 1969.

In the 1950s Britain appointed Julian Walker to survey more precise boundaries between the Trucial States and Oman. However, by the time of independence of the Trucial States (as the United Arab Emirates) in 1971, much of the border remained undemarcated, resulting in several disputes. The Ras Al Khaimah section of the boundary was settled in 1979 after a dispute arose in 1977-78 following the discovery of oil in the area. Relations between the two states warmed in the 1980s-90s, resulting in a border agreement for the southern section of the frontier in 1999, followed by a complete border delimitation ratified in Abu Dhabi on 22 June 2002.

== Barrier ==
In 2002, the UAE announced that it was installing a fence along the UAE-Oman border (minus the Madha-Nahwa enclaves) in an effort to curb the flow of illegal migrants, illicit drugs and terrorists into the country. The barrier constructed is a 4-metre (13 ft) barbed wire border fence.

In 2003, Oman introduced an exit toll on crossing to the UAE border. In July 2004, Oman and the UAE jointly launched a three-day coordinated crackdown in and around Al Buraimi and arrested approximately 1,000 illegal immigrants.

== Settlements near the border ==
=== Oman ===
- Tibat
- Quroon as Said
- Dibba Al-Baya
- Al Wajajah
- Aswad
- A'Tuvayah
- Hadf
- Al-Buraimi
- Mahdah
- Shinas
- Liwa
- Hamasa
- Al Qabil
- Sahl al Arba
- Safah
- Al Khuwayr

=== United Arab Emirates ===
- Sha'am
- Al Jeer
- Dibba Al-Fujairah
- Dibba Al-Hisn
- Shis
- Qidfa
- Sayh Mudayrah
- Mirbah
- Wahla
- Al Nasla
- Mosfuj
- Al Qor
- Fili
- Al Madam
- Shwaib
- Al Ain
- Al Ghafan
- Mezyad
- Al Arad
- Al Qua’a
- Umm az Zamul

== Border crossings ==
There are two border crossings on the Musandam section of the border (Tibat and Dibba) and four on the main southern section (Hatta/Al Wajajah, Hilli, Jebel Hafeet and Khatmat Malaha). There are no border controls at the Madha-Nahwa enclaves.

== Gallery ==
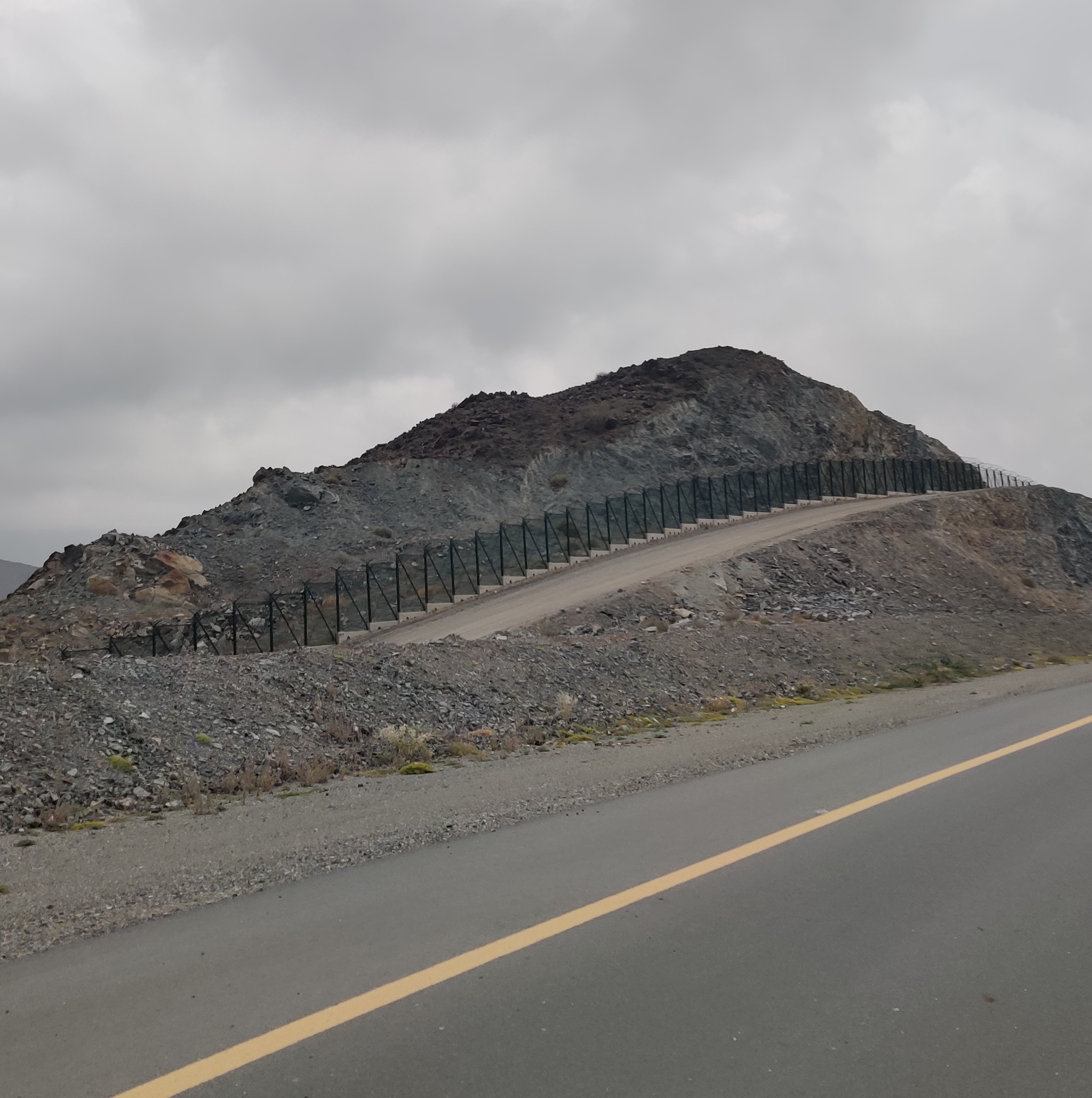
Border barrier between UAE and Oman as seen from the Emirati side.

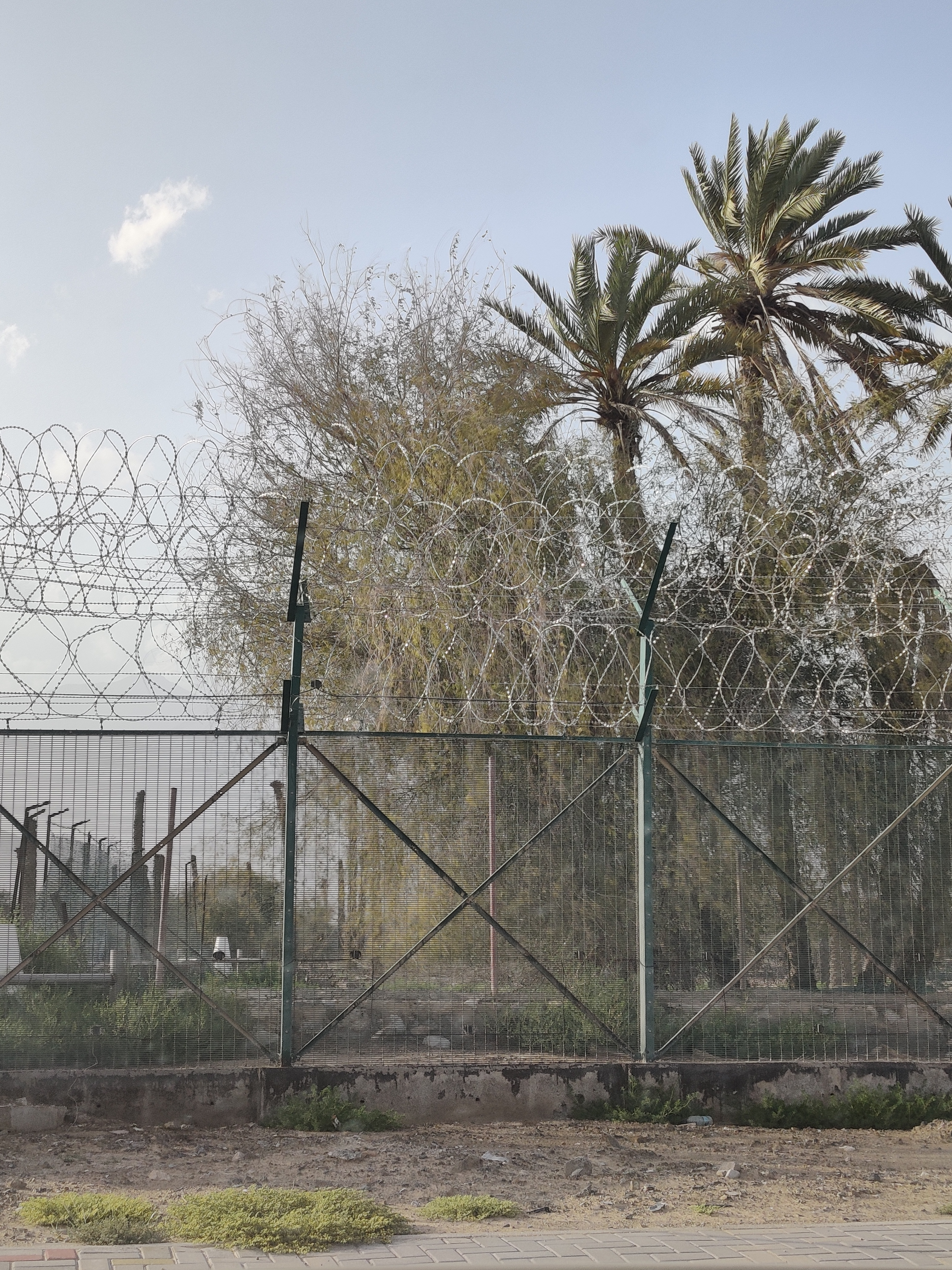
The barrier between Dibba Al-Hisn and Dibba Al-Baya as seen from the Emirati side.

== See also ==
- Oman-United Arab Emirates relations
