= Biladhi Shuhoom =

- Village
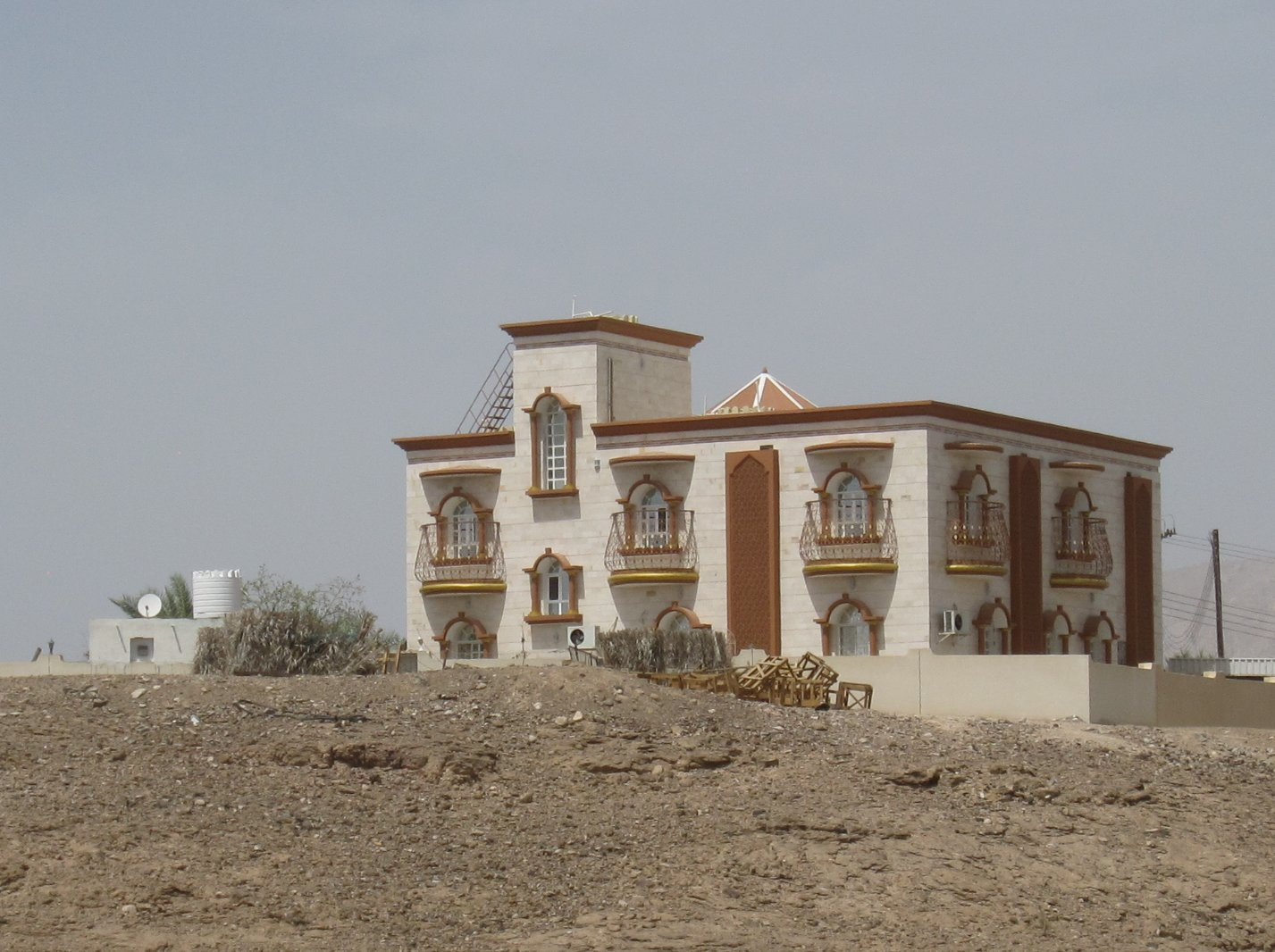
- Omani house in Biladhi Shuhoom
- Interactive map of Biladhi Shuhoom
- Coordinates: 23.23567°N 56.50337°E
- Country: Oman
- State: Ibri
- District: Mokhniyath

Biladhi Shuhoom is a small village near Ibri town in Oman. The village lies near Mokniyath town on the way to Ibri. There is one school and Friday mosque in the village.

== Transportation ==
The village has no bus service but there is a mud road through which four-wheeled vehicles can access the village. The population of the village is around 300 people.

== Demography ==
Most of the people living in the village are Omani Arabs of Bedouin descent. There are also a small number of expatriate workers from India, Pakistan, Sri Lanka, and Egypt. The total number of people is not more than 300.

== Geography ==
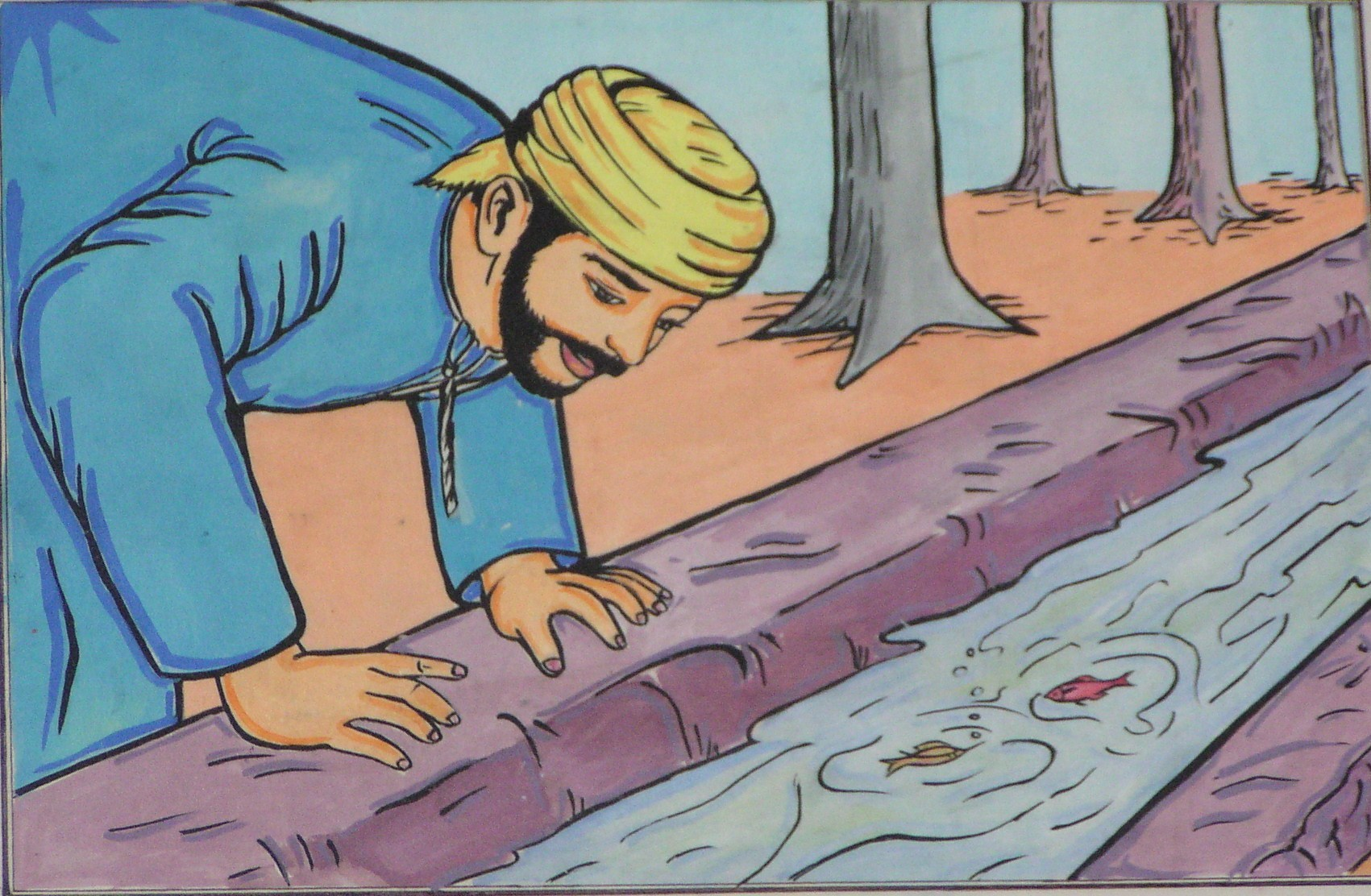
Biladhi Shuhoom has many wadis or mountain streams

Unlike other parts of Oman, this village is very green because of the presence of little mountain streams called wadis. The presence of water allows the cultivation of wheat and they also keep livestock here. Date farms are also common.

== Administration ==
Biladhi Shuhoom comes under Wilayath Ibri administration. The village has its own chief called Sheikh who has extensive powers in local matters.

== Education ==
There is a school in the village called Zeid bin Kathab secondary school. For higher studies, students go to Mokhniyath.

== See also ==
- Oman
- Ibri
- Wadi
