= Ahmad bin Na'aman Al Kaabi =

Ahmad bin Na'aman Al Ka'abi
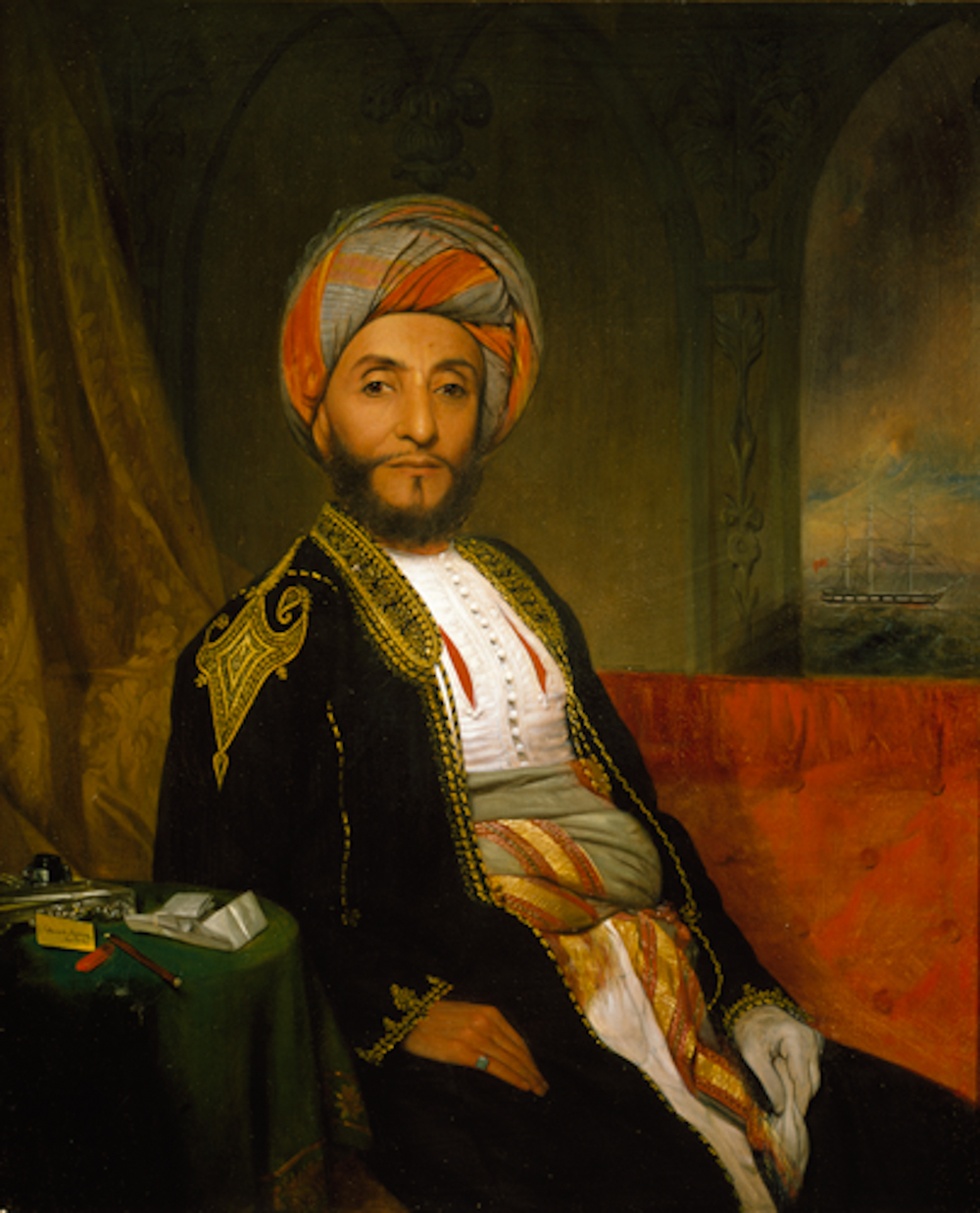
- Portrait of Ahmad bin Na'aman in Peabody Essex Museum
- Born: Ahmad bin Na'aman bin Muhsin bin Abdullah Al Ka'abi Al Bahrani; 1784; Oman
- Died: 1869; Zanzibar

Ahmad bin Na'aman Al Ka'abi (Arabic: أحمد بن نعمان الكعبي) was an Omani diplomat who was born in Basrah, Iraq. He was the first Arab emissary to visit the United States. He was sent by the Sultan of Oman, Sayyid Said bin Sultan and sailed in 1840 from Zanzibar, in a newly built ship, called the Sultanah, to New York for trade between the two countries. He worked as Sayyid Said's Private Secretary and Political Advisor. He kept a log book during the entire journey to the United States recording all the trade transactions and events. The log book was in the family of Saleh bin Abbas bin Abdulamir Al Shaibani through his father's great uncle, Nasser bin Saleh bin Suleiman Al Shaibani.

Na'aman had two daughters, Fatma and Maryam. The latter was married to Nasser bin Saleh bin Suleiman Al Shaibani but they had no children.

== Voyage to the United States ==
Sayyid Said bin Sultan had long flirted with the idea of sending one of his vessels to the US. In 1839, several senior members of the New York firm Scoville and Britton arrived in Zanzibar and sought to persuade Sayyid Said to open direct trade with New York. Sayyid Said selected his private secretary Ahmad bin Na'aman on his royal ship, Al-Sultanah for the voyage to New York. The ship was navigated by an English captain, but was replaced by an American sailing master upon its return to Zanzibar. After loading some cargo in Muscat, al-Sultanah took on additional cargo in Zanzibar and set sail for America, stopping only in St. Helena. The ship was well received on its arrival in New York in early May 1840 and its officers were invited to visit the Navy Yard, take a train ride, and attend a reception for the governor of New York and vice-president of the United States. The US Navy undertook repairs to al-Sultanah, as a gesture of gratitude for al-Sultanah's assistance to the American vessel Peacock, which had been damaged when it went aground on a coral reef off Masirah Island in 1835. The trip was primarily a commercial venture and al-Sultanah's cargo of Persian carpets, coffee, dates, ivory tusks, gum copal, cloves, and salted hides was offloaded in New York. The proceeds were used to purchase American goods including general merchandise, personal items for Sayyid Said and his brother, and some chandeliers and mirrors for several Zanzibar merchants.

Ahmad bin Na'aman had two daughters, Fatma and Maryam. His daughter Maryam was married to Nasser bin Saleh bin Nasser bin Suleiman Al-Sheibani but they had no children. Ahmad bin Na'aman's estate was inherited by Abdulamir bin Ali bin Saleh Al-Sheibani, the nephew of Nasser, Ahmad bin Na'aman's son in-law. Abdulamir bin Ali inherited Ahmad bin Na'aman's logbook that was used in the al-Sultanah's voyage to New York in 1840. Abdulamir's family donated the logbook to Oman's Ministry of Heritage and it is now in the Museum in Muscat. Ahmed bin Na'aman died in Zanzibar in 1869.

== See also ==
- Muscat and Oman
- Said bin Sultan
- Sultanate of Zanzibar
