= Sunaynah =

As-Sunaynah Arabic: ٱلسُّنَيْنَة, romanized: As-Sunaynah
- Village / Wilayah
- Location in Oman As-Sunaynah (Middle East) As-Sunaynah (Asia)
- Coordinates: 23°36′N 55°58′E
- Country: Oman
- Governorate: Al Buraimi Governorate

Population (2020)
  - Total: 1,474
- Time zone: UTC+4 (Oman Standard Time)

Sunaynah (Arabic: ٱلسُّنَيْنَة, romanized: As-Sunaynah) is a Wilayah (Province) in Al Buraimi Governorate, northeastern Oman. The village contains a substantial area of greenery and is described "remote, even by Omani standards". The village is reportedly occupied by the Al Nuaimi tribe; in the 1960s the tamimah of the Al Nuaim was reported to be 'Ali ibn Hamuda of the Al Bu Khuraiban division, who lived at Sunainah.

== Economy ==
Oil is found nearby in the Sala field and began mass commercial production in February 1984, although mention of oil drilling in the area was discussed back in the 1970s. the Sunaynah concession is operated 65 per cent by Occidental Petroleum Oman and 35 per cent by Gulf Oil Oman as of 1985. Chevron was said to have "offered its 18.2 per cent holding in Sunainah acreage". In the mid 1980s, test drilling by Occidental Oman, a subsidiary of the US' Occidental Petroleum Corporation, identified a potential output of 15000-20000 barrels a day from its Sunainah concession.

In March 2004, a 72-F fibre optic cable was laid from Sunaynah to the district capital of Ibri by the Oman Telecommunications Company.

== See also ==
- Al-Buraimi
- Al Qabil
- Hamasah
- Mahdah
