= Ibri =

Ibri Arabic: عِبْرِي, romanized: ʿIbrī
- Province
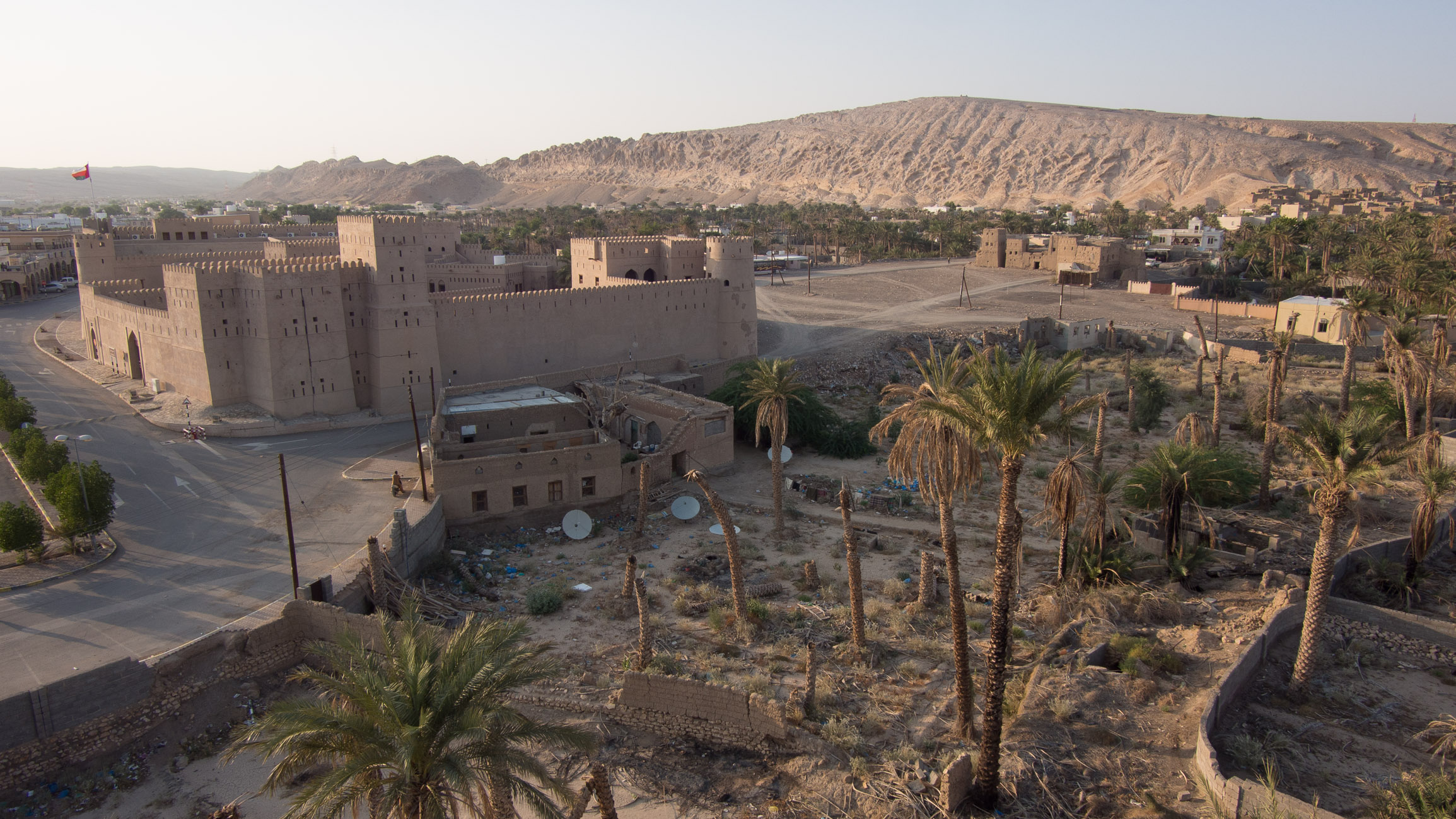
- Fort Ibri

- Location in Oman
- Coordinates: 23°14′11″N 56°30′16″E
- Country: Oman
- Governorate: Ad Dhahirah

Population (2020)
  - Total: 163,473
- Time zone: UTC+4 (Oman Standard Time)
- Postal code: 511

Ibri (Arabic: عِبْرِي, romanized: ʿIbrī) is a city and Wilāyat (Province) in the Ad Dhahirah Governorate, in northwest Oman.

== Ancient history ==
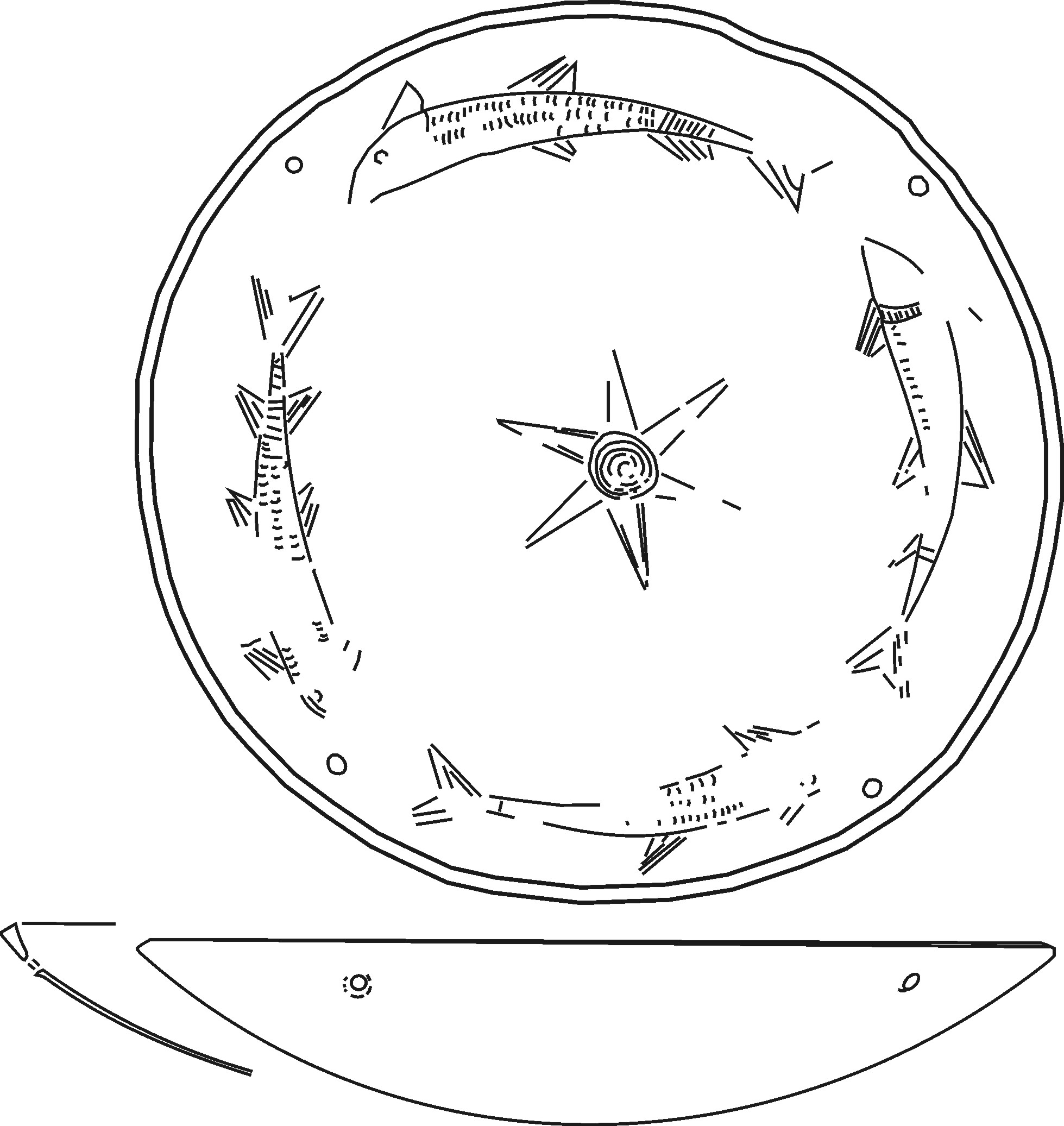
Early Iron Age copper alloy pan from the hoard at Ibri / Selme

Ibri Municipality (Wilayat Ibri) is distinguished by archaeological landmarks including forts, castles, and towers. In 1979, the largest metal hoard in the ancient Near East came to light in ʿIbri-Selme. Also, there are the remains of the town of Bat, which is the second archaeological site in Oman to be classified by UNESCO on the list of world heritage and culture sites, after the Bahla Fort in the A’Dakhliya district. The protohistoric archaeological complex of Bat, al-Khutm and al-Ayn represents one of the most complete and well-preserved ensembles of settlements and necropolises from the 3rd millennium BCE worldwide. The core site is a part of the modern village of Bat, in the Wadi Sharsah approximately 24 km (15 mi) east of the city of Ibri, in the Al-Dhahira Governorate of north-western Oman. Further extensions of the site of Bat are represented by the monumental tower at al-Khutm and by the necropolis at Al-Ayn. Together, monumental towers, rural settlements, irrigation systems for agriculture, and necropolises embedded in a fossilized Bronze Age landscape, form a unique example of cultural relics in an exceptional state of preservation.

Seven monumental stone towers have been discovered at Bat and one is located in Al-Khutm, 2 km (1.2 mi) west of Bat. The towers feature a circular outer wall about 20–25 m (66–82 ft) in diameter, and two rows of parallel compartments on either side of a central well. The earliest known tower at Bat is the mud-brick Hafit period structure underneath the Early Umm An-Nar stone tower at Matariya. The latest known tower is probably Kasr al-Rojoom, which can be ceramically dated to the Late Umm an-Nar period (ca. 2200–2000). All of the stone-built towers show dressed blocks of local limestone laid carefully with simple mud mortar. While conclusive evidence of their function is still missing, they seem to be platforms on which superstructures (now missing) were built – either houses, or temples, or something else entirely. The vast necropolis at Bat includes different clusters of monumental tombs that can be divided into two distinct groups. The first group is Hafit-period "beehive" tombs located on the top of the rocky slopes surrounding Bat, while the second group extends over a river terrace and includes more than a hundred dry-stone cairn tombs. Another important group of beehive tombs is located at Qubur Juhhal at Al-Ayn, 22 km (14 mi) east-southeast of Bat. Most of these tombs are small, single-chambered, round tombs with dry masonry walls dating to the beginning of the 3rd millennium BCE. Others are more elaborate, bigger, multi-chambered tombs from the second half of the 3rd millennium BCE. As in many other ancient civilizations, monuments in ancient Oman were usually built with regularly cut stones. Unique of Bat and Al-Ayn are the remains the ancient quarries from which the building materials were mined, and the many workshops that attest to the complete operational procedure, from the quarries, to the stone-masonry, to the buildings construction techniques. The continuous and systematic survey activities constantly increase the types and number of monuments and sites to be documented and protected, which include villages and multiple towers, quarries associated with the Bronze Age stone-masonry workshops, Bronze Age necropolises, an Iron Age fort, Iron Age tombs, and two Neolithic flint mines connected with workshop areas for stone tool-making.

== Geography ==
=== Climate ===
Ibri is characterized by a hot desert climate (Köppen-Geiger climate classification BWh). The average annual temperature is 26.2 °C (79.2 °F), and about 78 mm (3.07 in) of precipitation falls annually. Most of the rainfall occurs in winter.

Climate data for Ibri, elevation 327 m (1,073 ft), (1991–2020 normals, extremes 2004–2023)
Month	Jan	Feb	Mar	Apr	May	Jun	Jul	Aug	Sep	Oct	Nov	Dec	Year
Record high °C (°F)	33.0 (91.4)	36.5 (97.7)	41.0 (105.8)	43.3 (109.9)	49.5 (121.1)	49.8 (121.6)	49.2 (120.6)	48.6 (119.5)	47.2 (117.0)	43.4 (110.1)	37.0 (98.6)	36.5 (97.7)	49.8 (121.6)
Mean daily maximum °C (°F)	25.7 (78.3)	28.7 (83.7)	32.5 (90.5)	37.6 (99.7)	41.9 (107.4)	44.6 (112.3)	44.6 (112.3)	43.6 (110.5)	41.5 (106.7)	37.5 (99.5)	31.7 (89.1)	27.6 (81.7)	36.5 (97.6)
Daily mean °C (°F)	19.4 (66.9)	22.0 (71.6)	25.7 (78.3)	30.8 (87.4)	34.9 (94.8)	37.1 (98.8)	37.7 (99.9)	36.7 (98.1)	34.7 (94.5)	31.1 (88.0)	25.6 (78.1)	21.2 (70.2)	29.7 (85.6)
Mean daily minimum °C (°F)	13.2 (55.8)	15.3 (59.5)	18.6 (65.5)	23.3 (73.9)	27.3 (81.1)	29.3 (84.7)	30.8 (87.4)	30.0 (86.0)	27.9 (82.2)	24.4 (75.9)	19.7 (67.5)	15.0 (59.0)	22.9 (73.2)
Record low °C (°F)	6.6 (43.9)	6.0 (42.8)	9.2 (48.6)	13.4 (56.1)	17.5 (63.5)	21.0 (69.8)	23.6 (74.5)	20.9 (69.6)	22.2 (72.0)	18.6 (65.5)	11.0 (51.8)	7.3 (45.1)	6.0 (42.8)
Average precipitation mm (inches)	4.6 (0.18)	17.4 (0.69)	15.5 (0.61)	10.8 (0.43)	0.5 (0.02)	3.2 (0.13)	6.5 (0.26)	1.8 (0.07)	3.1 (0.12)	0.2 (0.01)	0.0 (0.0)	3.9 (0.15)	67.5 (2.67)
Average precipitation days (≥ 1.0 mm)	0.9	0.5	1.1	0.9	0.5	0.5	1.1	1.9	0.6	0.6	0.5	0.6	9.7
Source 1: World Meteorological Organization (precipitation 2000–2009)
Source 2: Starlings Roost Weather

== Economy ==
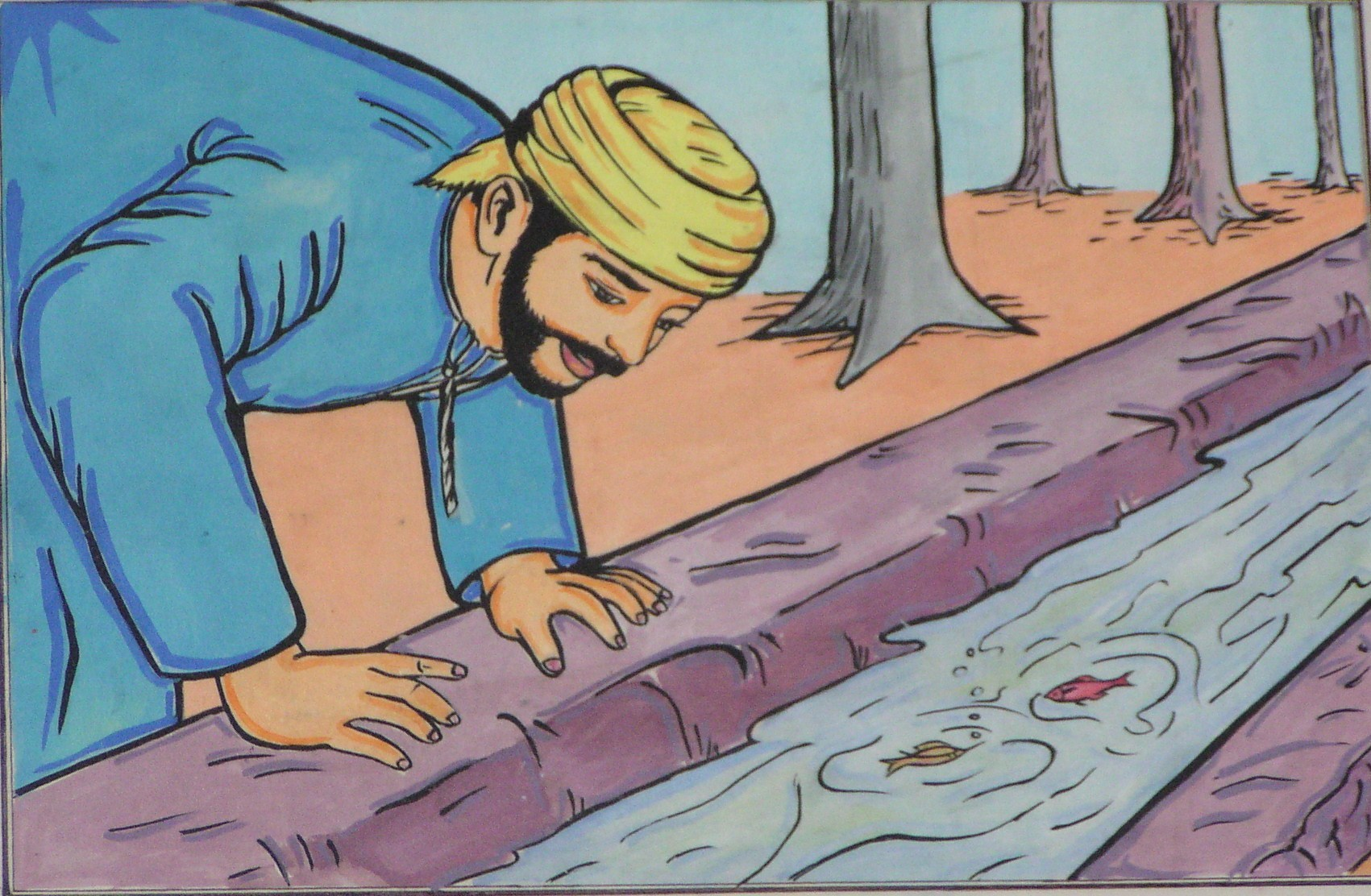
An Omani falaj (water canal)

Historically, Ibri was known for its market and for fruit.

Ibri is currently a center for marble quarrying. In 2022, a landslide killed 10 quarry workers in the area of Al-Aridh.

The area is also home to the Ibri 2 Solar Power Plant, a 500-megawatt solar farm that is Oman's largest renewable energy project. Completed in 2022 by a consortium of companies from Saudi Arabia, Kuwait, and other Gulf states, the project is expected to power 33,000 homes. The plant consists of 1.4 million solar panels and covers an area of 13 million square meters.

== Education ==
There are many government primary and secondary schools in the wilayah plus some private primary schools and one Indian school. In terms of higher education, there is the Ibri College of Technology and a College of Applied Sciences. In addition to this, there are many institutes offering various courses.

The United States Department of State-funded Critical Language Scholarship Program offers Arabic-language training in Ibri, through the Noor Majan Training Institute.

== Culture ==
Ibri was one of three locations in Ad Dhahirah Governorate to host the first Al Dhahirah International Film Festival, in October 2022.

== Transport ==
Ibri is connected by road to the Emirati city of Al-Ain, via the Mezyad border post near Jebel Hafeet. This road also goes through the Wilayat of Dhank and to Nizwa.

In September 2021, a road between Oman and Saudi Arabia was completed. Measuring between 700 and 800 kilometres (430 and 500 miles) in total, it extends from Ibri to Al-Ahsa in eastern Saudi Arabia. The Omani side of the road measures approximately 160 km (99 miles), and the Saudi side 580 km (360 miles). Aside from the Empty Quarter, the road goes through the archaeological sites.

== See also ==
- Al-Buraimi
  - Sunaynah
- Biladhi Shuhoom
- Railway stations in Oman
- List of cities in Oman
