= Al-Buraimi =

Omani town on the border of the United Arab Emirates

Al Buraimi Al-Buraimī (ٱلْبُرَيْمِي)
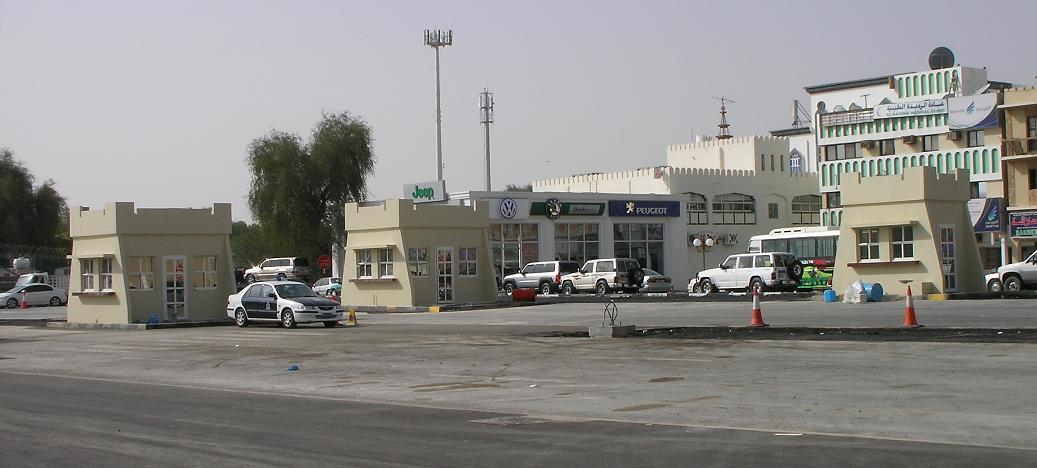
- Border between Al-Buraimi (Oman) and Al Ain (the UAE)
- Interactive map of Al Buraimi
- Location in Oman Al Buraimi (Middle East) Al Buraimi (West and Central Asia)
- Coordinates: 24°15′33″N 55°47′2″E
- Country: Oman
- Governorate: Al Buraimi
- Elevation: 292 m (958 ft)

Population (2020 Census)
  - Total: 92,223
- Time zone: UTC+4 (Omani Standard Time)

Al-Buraimi (Arabic: ٱلْبُرَيْمِي, romanized: Al-Buraymī) is an oasis city and a wilayah (province) in northern Oman, on the border with the United Arab Emirates. It is the capital of Al Buraimi Governorate and is located approximately 343 km (213 miles) from the national capital Muscat. It is bordered by the United Arab Emirates city of Al Ain, and the wilayas Mahdah and Dhank.

Al-Buraimi has taken the motto of Al-Khandaq Fort (the Trench Fort). It includes several important historical landmarks, such as forts and heritage houses. One of the prominent ones is the "Bayt Bahr" (House of the Sea). Among its castles are Al Fayd-Hafit Castle and Wadi Al Jizi Castle.

Within the province, there are some villages, including around 49 aflaj indigenous water management structures, in addition to extensive sandy deserts. Al-Buraimi Governorate serves as a major commercial market, where goods and commodities from neighboring governorates are received. A large market is held there to showcase various necessities.

== History ==
The governorate stands out as a unique and expansive Omani market, encompassing a multitude of historical states. In ancient times, around 600 CE, the city of Al Buraimi was an integral part of the Sultanate. Subsequently, Omani Azdi tribes took control of the region. Al Buraimi oasis was eventually abandoned around 700. Throughout history, the area was known as "Tawam" and "Al Jaw," featuring a large oasis consisting of nine villages: Sa'ara, Hamasah, Haili, Al-Jaimi, Al-Mawijai, Al-Mu'tarid, Al-Jahili, Al Ain and Al-Qutayrah. Al-Buraimi Governorate serves as a welcoming hub for visitors from various regions, renowned for its hospitable people. The original inhabitants are Al Nuaimi tribal group, particularly Al-Naimi tribe. Notably, the rebuilding of Al Buraimi saw rulers such as Sultan bin Mohammed Al Hamoud Al Qurtasi Al Nuaimi and later, Sheikh Saqr bin Sultan bin Mohammed Al Hamoud Al Qurtasi Al Nuaimi.

In the pre-Saudi era, Al-Buraimi was governed by Al-Zar'a family. Al-Surur family held authority over Hamasah, the Bani Jaber tribe over Sa'ara, and Al-Azaznah tribe over Al Hailah village. Over time, the region came under the influence of Al Saud. Following the passing of Prince Turki bin Ahmed Al Sudairi, a power struggle ensued for control of Al-Buraimi between Sheikh Zayed I and Ali bin Hamoud. Sheikh Ali bin Hamoud Al Nuaimi assumed guardianship of the children of Sheikh Al Filani Al Qassar, the ruler of Dhank, and cleverly seized control. His son, Mohammed bin Ali, succeeded him in leadership and sought to make Al Buraimi the capital. During this era, Al Buraimi was under the rule of Hamad bin Abdullah Al Jirahi, known as "Ghubar."

Tensions arose between Ghubar and Sheikh Zayed bin Khalifa Al Nahyan, the ruler of Abu Dhabi. These conflicts nearly resulted in Ghubar's dominance over Al Buraimi. However, intervention by Mohammed bin Ali and his allies paved the way for a peace agreement. Tragically, Al-Azaznah tribe betrayed Mohammed bin Ali, leading to his assassination and their appointment of him as ruler of Al Buraimi. Mohammed bin Ali had strong ties with the Bani Jaber tribe in Sa'ara, eventually assuming leadership around 1873 or 1874. The Al Hamoud family's rule persisted until 1950, with the final ruler being Sheikh Saqr bin Sultan bin Mohammed Al Hamoud.

=== Buraimi Crisis ===
The Buraimi dispute, also known as the Buraimi Oasis Dispute, was a border conflict involving Saudi Arabia, Oman, and the United Arab Emirates concerning the Buraimi Governorate situated within the Sultanate of Oman.

== Buildings ==
=== Al-Khandaq Fort ===
Al-Khandaq Fort (Arabic: حُصْن ٱلْخَنْدَق, romanized: Ḥuṣn Al-Khandaq) in Al-Buraimi is considered one of the important landmarks in the province. It was named "Al-Khandaq" (Arabic: ٱلْخَنْدَق, lit. 'The Trench') because it is surrounded by a trench for defensive purposes. This strategic approach was used in the past to protect cities, castles, and forts in Oman since periods before the arrival of Islam. The construction of the fort dates back to the first half of the 19th century AD, which corresponds to the second half of the 13th century in the (Hijri calendar).

The fort is square in shape and consists of approximately ten rooms spread across its area, along with its towers. The fort includes four towers situated at its four corners, and its total area is about 3,070 m^{2} (33,000 sq ft).

=== Al-Hillah Fort ===
Al-Hillah Fort (Arabic: حُصْن ٱلْحِلَّة, romanized: Ḥuṣn Al-Ḥillah) is located in the area of Haraat Al Souq. It was built by Sheikh Mohammed bin Ali bin Hamoud Al-Nuaimi on an area of approximately 4,200 m^{2} (45,000 sq ft), where the components of the fort are distributed. It is possible that this fort was constructed to replace Al Khandaq Fort and meet the needs of local administration. The fort is surrounded by a wall, with the main facade extending for a length of 79 m (259 ft). The northern facade stretches for 53 metres (174 feet), and the outer wall's height ranges from 4–6 metres (13–20 feet).

Al-Hillah Fort stands out for its gypsum decorations and designs, setting it apart from others. It is located in the heart of Al-Buraimi Oasis. Throughout history, it has been a center of conflict due to its location on the overland route between Sohar and the Persian Gulf, giving it a captivating historical significance.

The fort also includes three fortified tower-like structures that are 10 m (33 ft) in height. Internally, the fort is divided into two courtyards, northern and southern, each with its associated facilities. The upper residential area features two decorated rooms in various sections adorned with lunar motifs, window grills, and bands beneath the roof. This upper area also has a southern-facing upper band. Throughout the fort, doors and windows are adorned with distinctive carvings on wood, along with some ornate iron windows.

The fort is constructed from stone, gypsum, and clay. The Ministry of Heritage and Culture undertook a restoration project that lasted for 35 months.

=== Institutions ===
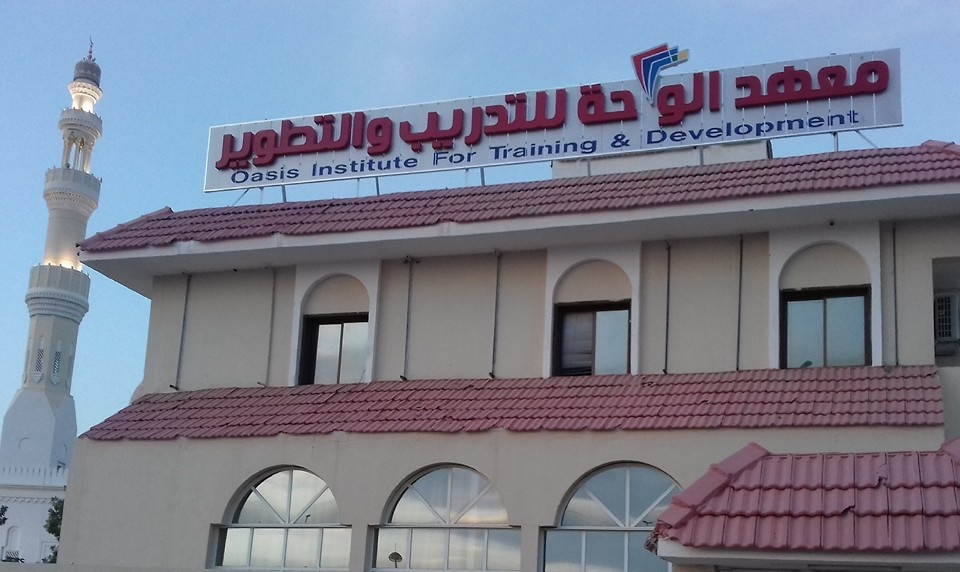
The Oasis Institute for Training and Development, near the Sultan Qaboos Grand Mosque

The Oasis Institute for Training and Development (Arabic: مَعْهَد ٱلْوَاحَة لِلتَّدْرْيْب وَٱلتَّطْوِيْر, romanized: Maʿhad Al-Wāḥah Lit-Tadrīb Wat-Taṭwīr; 24°15′37.37″N 55°47′6.06″E) is an institution which was approved by the KUDOS International Learning Organization.

=== Mosques ===
The most prominent place of worship in Al-Buraimi is the Sultan Qaboos Grand Mosque, named after the former Sultan of Oman, Qaboos bin Said Al Said.

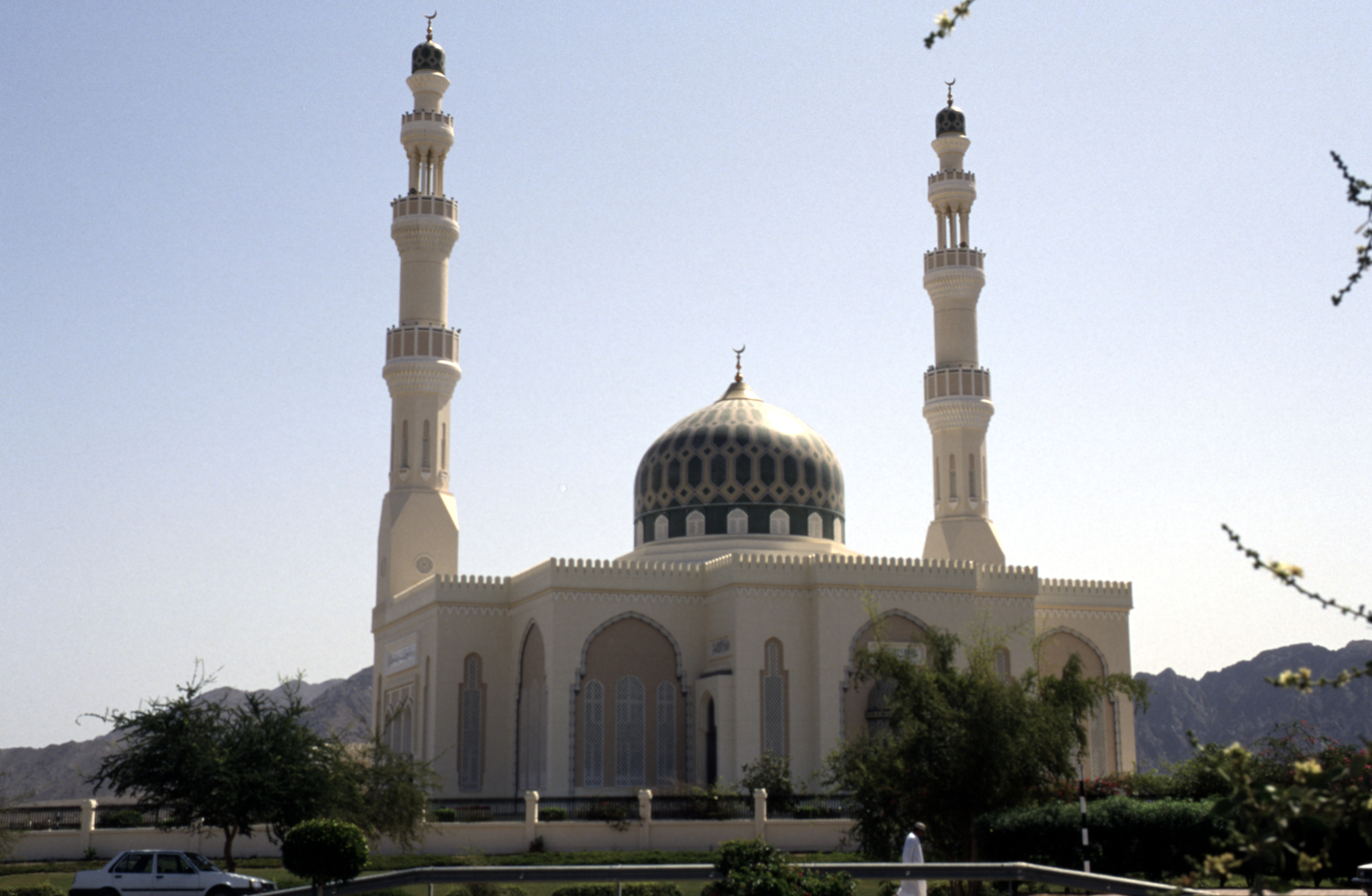
The Grand Mosque

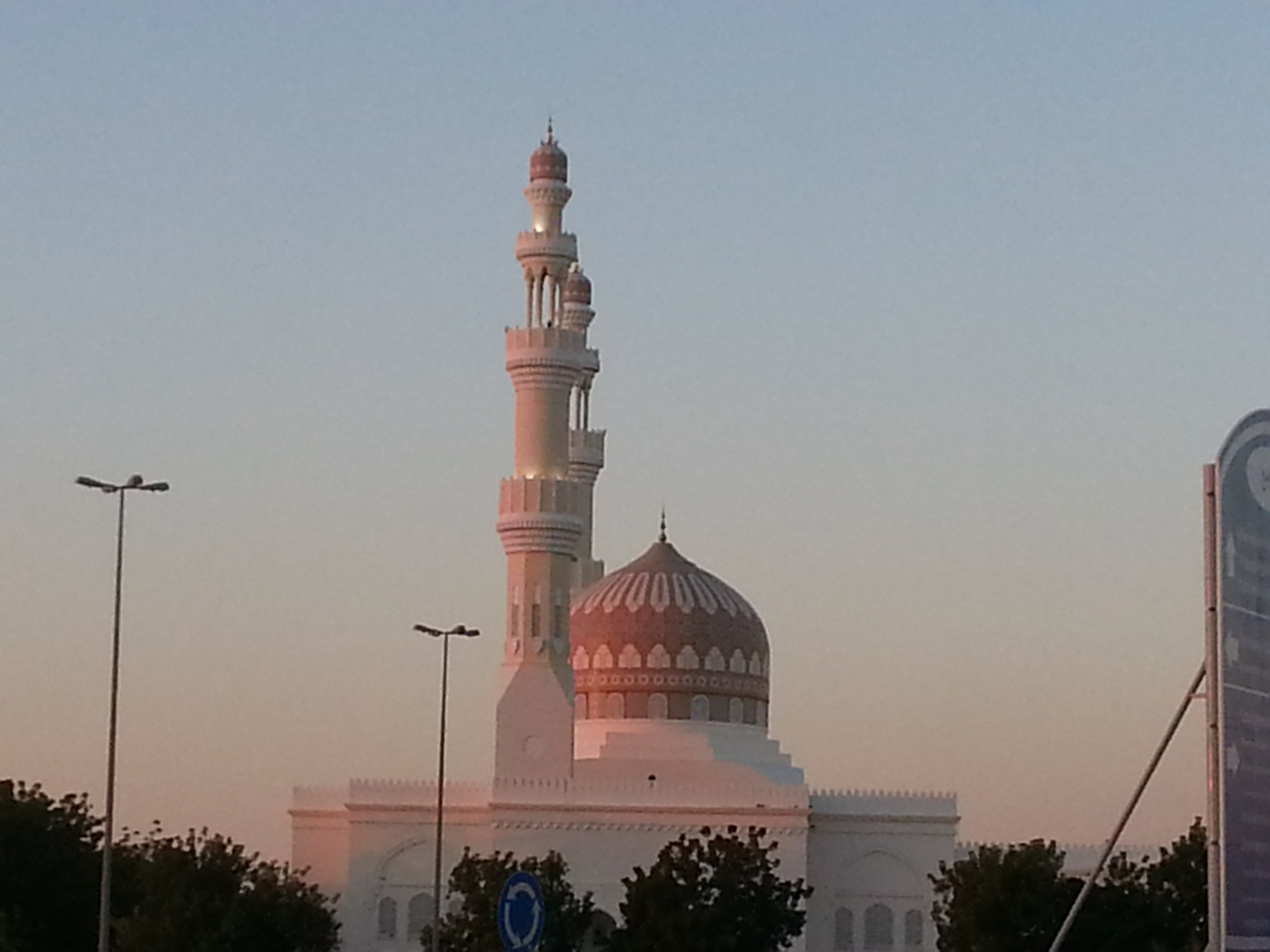

== Tourism ==
=== Al Buraimi Souq ===
Al Buraimi Souq is one of the most famous tourist destinations in Al Buraimi. It is considered the largest open Arab market. The market stands out for its old architectural charm, with origins dating back to the late 1990s, aimed at reviving traditional Omani handicrafts.

Within the market, visitors may find a wide range of food products, including vegetables, fruits, various agricultural crops, as well as smoked and dried fish, among others. Visitors may stroll through the market for shopping and purchasing souvenir gifts, including traditional handicrafts such as textiles, silver jewelry, ceramics, and more.

=== Hafeet Mountain ===
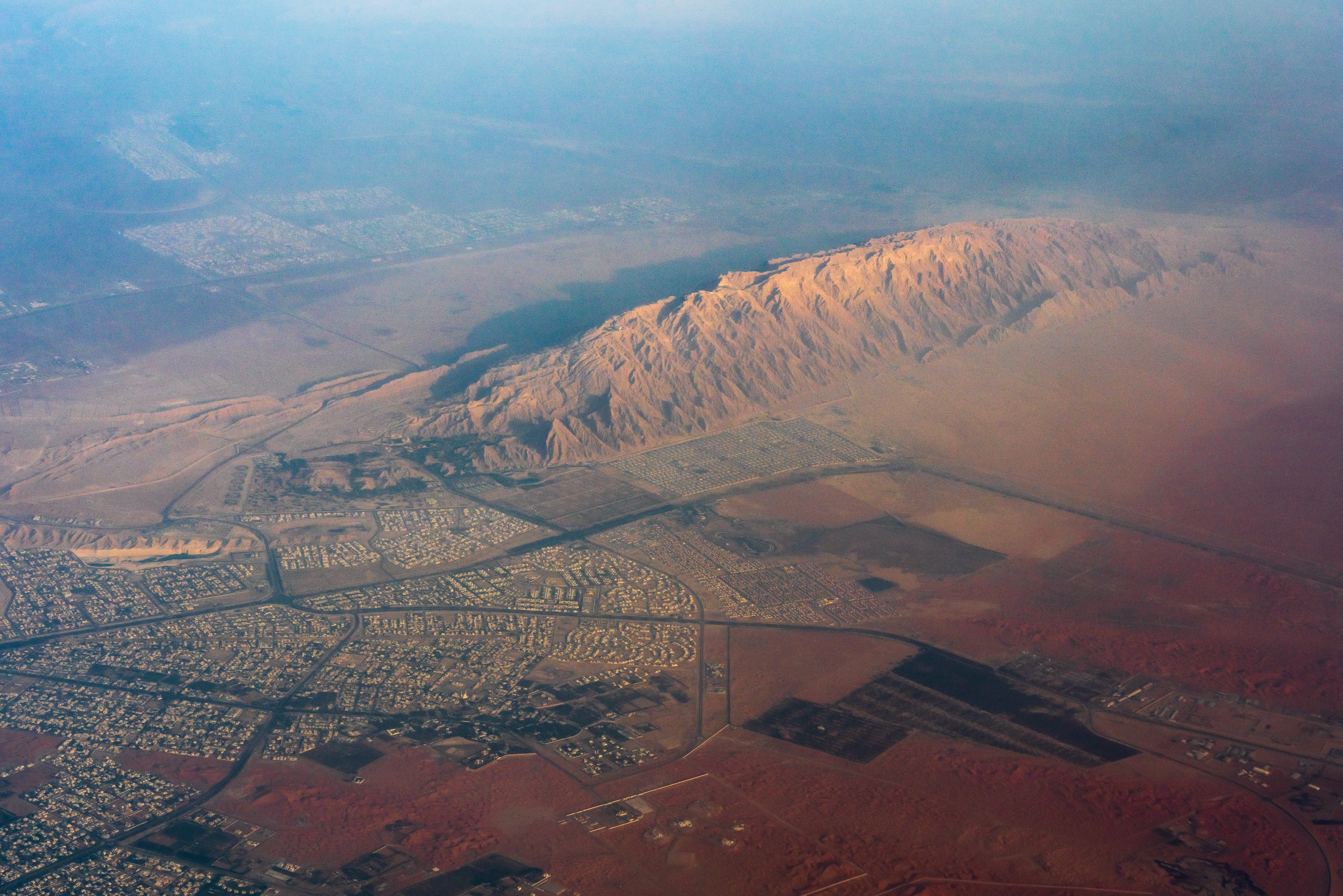
Jebel Hafeet straddles the border of Oman and the U.A.E., and overlooks the twin settlements of Al-Buraimi and Al-Ain

The historical site of Jebel Hafeet stands as one of the prominent tourist attractions in Al-Buraimi, Oman. It holds significant popularity in the region, as it reflects the convergence of two civilizations dating back over 3,000 years – the "Bat" and "Umm Al Nar" civilizations.

Visitors can engage in guided tours and enjoy observing the tombs and beehive structures, as well as pottery artifacts associated with the Jamdat Nasr civilization in Iraq. This site holds crucial historical importance and appeals especially to history enthusiasts.

=== Public Park ===
One of the essential recreational spots to visit in Al Buraimi city is the Al Buraimi Public Park. This location ranks among the notable tourist destinations in Al Buraimi, Oman, suitable for families and children. It stands as one of the most significant and expansive parks within the governorate.

The park offers its visitors relaxation within vast green spaces, leisurely strolls and walks, long-distance jogging, and playful activities with children. Additionally, it provides the opportunity to relish dining or outdoor barbecue gatherings.

== Climate ==
Climate data for Buraimi (1986–2009)
Month	Jan	Feb	Mar	Apr	May	Jun	Jul	Aug	Sep	Oct	Nov	Dec	Year
Mean daily maximum °C (°F)	23.6 (74.5)	26.2 (79.2)	30.3 (86.5)	36.2 (97.2)	41.5 (106.7)	43.7 (110.7)	43.9 (111.0)	43.7 (110.7)	41.0 (105.8)	36.9 (98.4)	31.0 (87.8)	26.0 (78.8)	35.3 (95.6)
Mean daily minimum °C (°F)	11.4 (52.5)	13.6 (56.5)	16.5 (61.7)	20.6 (69.1)	24.6 (76.3)	27.3 (81.1)	29.8 (85.6)	30.1 (86.2)	27.0 (80.6)	22.4 (72.3)	17.2 (63.0)	13.4 (56.1)	21.2 (70.1)
Average rainfall mm (inches)	20.4 (0.80)	15.2 (0.60)	15.7 (0.62)	6.2 (0.24)	4.1 (0.16)	2.4 (0.09)	11.7 (0.46)	2.7 (0.11)	2.0 (0.08)	0.3 (0.01)	0.0 (0.0)	14.2 (0.56)	94.9 (3.73)
Source: World Meteorological Organization

== See also ==
- Archaeological Sites of Bat, Al-Khutm and Al-Ayn
- Hamasah
- Mahdah
- Sunaynah
