= Al Dhahirah Governorate =

Governorate of Oman

Coordinates: 23°N 56°E

Al-Dhahirah
- Governorate
- Al-Dhahirah, Governorate of Oman
- Country: Oman
- Capital: Ibri

Government
  - Governor: Najeeb bin Ali bin Ahmed Al Rawas

Area
  - Total: 37,000 km^{2} (14,000 sq mi)

Population (2020)
  - Total: 213,043
  - Density: 5.8/km^{2} (15/sq mi)

Al Dhahirah Governorate (Arabic: محافظة الظاهرة, romanized: Muḥāfaẓat aẓ-Ẓāhirah, lit. 'The Phenomenon') is one of the eleven governorates (muhafazah) of Oman. It was previously a region (mintaqah), and became a governorate on 28 October 2011. The largest city in the governorate is Ibri.

== Economy ==
Al Dhahirah Governorate is the location of the biggest oil field in Oman, Yibal, which started operations in 1968.

== Provinces ==
The governorate consists of three provinces, or wilayat:

- Ibri
- Yanqul
- Dhank

== Regional Subdivision ==
Until October 2006, two more former wilayat were also part of this region, Al Buraymi and Mahdha. Al Buraimi Governorate was formed from these provinces as a new governorate in October 2006. A third wilaya, Al Sunaynah, was created from rural parts of Al Buraymi and Mahdha.

== Demographics ==
Historical population
Census year	Pop.	±% p.a.
1993	124,606	—
2003	130,177	+0.44%
2010	151,664	+2.21%
2020	213,043	+3.46%
Source: Citypopulation
