= Mahdah =

Mahdah Arabic: مَحْضَة, romanized: Maḥḍah
- Wilayah
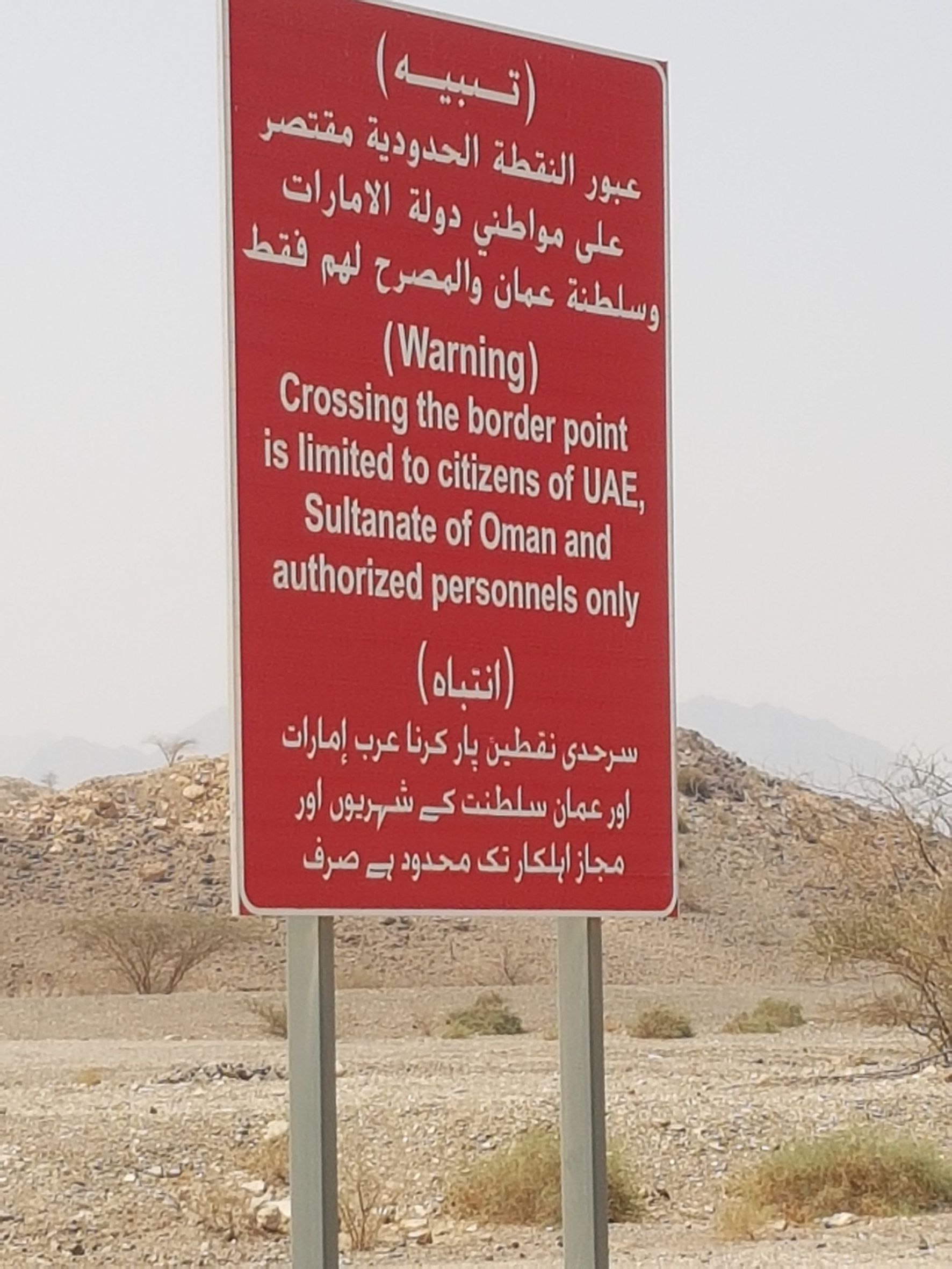
- Sign board at border point Hatta/Madam road passing through Mahdah

- Location in Oman
- Country: Oman
- Governorate: Al-Buraimi

Government
  - Sultan: Haitham bin Tariq
  - Wāli: Salim Ali Al Kaabi
- Time zone: UTC+4 (GST)

Mahdah (Arabic: مَحْضَة, romanized: Maḥḍah), or Wilāyat Maḥḍah (وِلَايَة مَحْضَة), is an Omani Wilayah (province) north of the town of Buraimi which borders the emirates of Sharjah, Ajman and Dubai, to the east, it borders the Wilayats of Liwa and Sohar. It was previously necessary to pass through Mahdah when travelling through Madam to reach the Ajman exclave of Masfut, as well as the Dubai exclave of Hatta, a tourist spot popular for its hotel, heritage village and the famous (although now a metalled road) Hatta track. The Mleiha road bypasses Mahdah for travel from the Emirates' coastal towns to Hatta and Masfut.

Mahdah contains the township of Rawdah and is governed from Buraimi. It was traditionally home to the Bani Kaab tribe.

== History ==
Home to the Bani Kaab, Mahdah has long been strategically important due to its location along its border with the United Arab Emirates. In the mid-20th century, the area became a focal point during the Buraimi Dispute, a territorial conflict between Oman and Saudi Arabia over control of the Al Buraimi Oasis. During British efforts to resolve the conflict in 1955, they deployed overwhelming force to avoid bloodshed, sending in 220 men and two squadrons of the Trucial Oman Levies against a small Saudi force. However, the operation was complicated by the presence of the Bani Kaab from Mahdah under Sheikh Obaid bin Juma. Though subjects of the Sultanate of Muscat and Oman, the Bani Kaab supported Sheikh Rashid bin Hamad of the Al Bu Shamis, another influential tribal group in the region.

== Administration ==
Administratively, Mahdah is affiliated with the jurisdiction of Al-Rawda and is set to host a special economic zone as part of Oman's Vision 2040. This development aims to support economic growth by establishing projects, attracting investments, and creating job opportunities for citizens.

== Border ==
Previously a 'soft' border, the road through Mahdah from the Emirates now has formal border entry and exit points, open only to GCC nationals. Crossing the Omani border at Mahdah represents an exit from/entry to the UAE. The trip to the Omani border at Hatta is a popular one for expatriates from qualifying countries performing a 'visa run' in order to renew their visit visas to the UAE. A visit visa is valid for one month, renewable at a police station up to three months but then requires an exit from the country. As a number of, mainly Western, nationalities acquire a 'visa on entry', a trip to the Hatta border post and then back results in the renewal of an expiring three-month visit visa. This trip has been rendered a great deal less popular since Dubai, and the UAE in general, has reformed immigration practices and streamlined residence visa issuance and renewal.

It is claimed the first Arab Ambassador to America, Ahmed Bin Na'man Al Kaabi, came from Mahdah in 1840.
