= Al Buraimi Governorate =

Governorate of Oman

Al Buraimi Governorate Muḥāfaẓat Al-Buraimī (مُحَافَظَة ٱلْبُرَيْمِي)
- Governorate
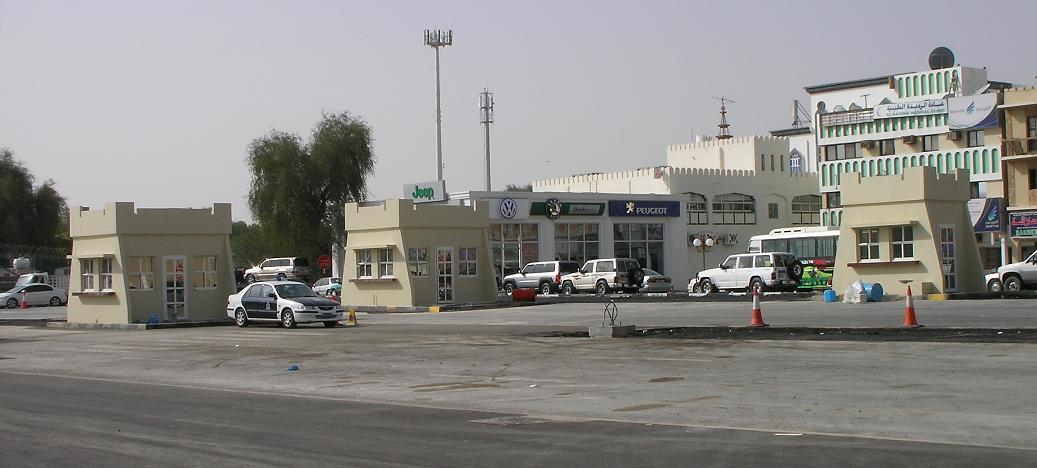
- Border control with Al-Ain as of late 2006

- Coordinates: 24°15′N 55°47′E
- Country: Oman
- Capital: Al-Buraimi

Government
  - Governor: Dr. Hamad bin Ahmed bin Saud Al Busaidi

Area
  - Land: 7,000 km^{2} (2,700 sq mi)

Population (December 2020)
  - Total: 121,802

Al Buraimi Governorate (Arabic: مُحَافَظَة ٱلْبُرَيْمِي, romanized: Muḥāfaẓat Al-Buraimī) is one of the 11 governorates of Oman. The area was part of Ad Dhahirah Region until October 2006, when a new governorate was created from the wilayats (provinces) of Al Buraymi and Mahdah. A third wilayat, As-Sunaynah, was created from parts of the two. Dr. Hamad bin Ahmed Al Busaidi has been governor since 2020.

The town of Al-Buraimi is an oasis town in northwestern Oman, on the border of the United Arab Emirates. Al Ain is an adjacent city on the UAE side of the border. Both settlements are part of the historical region of Tawam or Al-Buraimi Oasis. For many decades, there had been an open border between Al-Buraimi located in Oman and Al-Ain. In September 2006, this border was relocated to an area near Hilli which is around 8 kilometres (5.0 miles) from the traditional open border. The traditional border near Al-Ain City is now closed to all except to those with valid visas (GCC nationals require no visa).

== Climate ==
Al Buraimi has a hot desert climate (Köppen climate classification: BWh). Daily high temperatures average over 40 degrees Celsius (104 degrees Fahrenheit) from May through September.

Climate data for Buraimi (1986-2009)
Month	Jan	Feb	Mar	Apr	May	Jun	Jul	Aug	Sep	Oct	Nov	Dec	Year
Mean daily maximum °C (°F)	23.6 (74.5)	26.2 (79.2)	30.3 (86.5)	36.2 (97.2)	41.5 (106.7)	43.7 (110.7)	43.9 (111.0)	43.7 (110.7)	41.0 (105.8)	36.9 (98.4)	31.0 (87.8)	26.0 (78.8)	35.3 (95.6)
Daily mean °C (°F)	17.5 (63.5)	19.9 (67.8)	23.4 (74.1)	28.4 (83.1)	33.1 (91.6)	35.5 (95.9)	36.9 (98.4)	36.9 (98.4)	34.0 (93.2)	29.7 (85.5)	24.1 (75.4)	19.7 (67.5)	28.3 (82.9)
Mean daily minimum °C (°F)	11.4 (52.5)	13.6 (56.5)	16.5 (61.7)	20.6 (69.1)	24.6 (76.3)	27.3 (81.1)	29.8 (85.6)	30.1 (86.2)	27.0 (80.6)	22.4 (72.3)	17.2 (63.0)	13.4 (56.1)	21.2 (70.1)
Average precipitation mm (inches)	20.4 (0.80)	15.2 (0.60)	15.7 (0.62)	6.2 (0.24)	4.1 (0.16)	2.4 (0.09)	11.7 (0.46)	2.7 (0.11)	2.0 (0.08)	0.3 (0.01)	0.0 (0.0)	14.2 (0.56)	94.9 (3.73)
Source: World Meteorological Organization (temperature and rainfall 1986–2009)

== Demographics ==
Historical population
Census year	Pop.	±% p.a.
1993	56,618	—
2003	76,838	+3.10%
2010	72,917	−0.75%
2020	121,802	+5.26%
Source: Citypopulation

As of 2020, Al Buraimi Governorate had a population of 121,802, more than doubling in size since 1993. It is the third-least-populous of Oman's 11 governorates, after Musandam and Al Wusta. The city of Al-Buraimi, with 92,223 inhabitants, comprises the vast majority of the governorate's population.

== Infrastructure ==
=== Transportation ===
Transportation in and around Al-Buraimi mainly occurs using private cars and taxis. Buraimi also lies on a bus route from Dubai to Muscat.

=== Landmarks ===
Al-Buraimi, like the rest of Oman, features many historic forts in varying condition. The largest mosque in Al-Buraimi is the Sultan Qaboos Grand Mosque, named after the former Sultan, Qaboos bin Said Al Said. There are ruins of ancient hovels and a fort in Al-Buraimi.

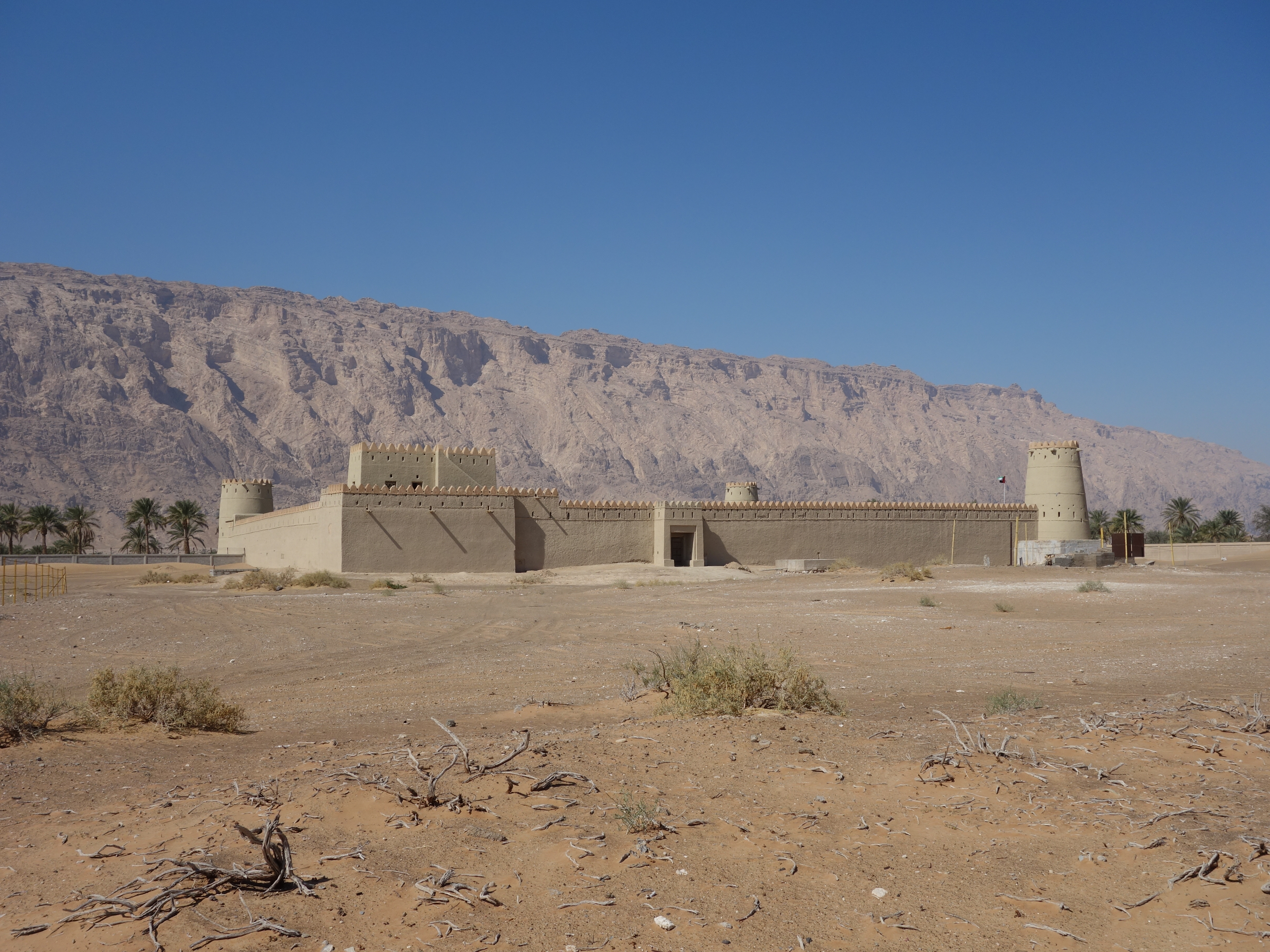
Jebel Hafeet, which the governorate shares with the U.A.E., as viewed from Mezyad Fort in the adjacent Emirati city of Al Ain

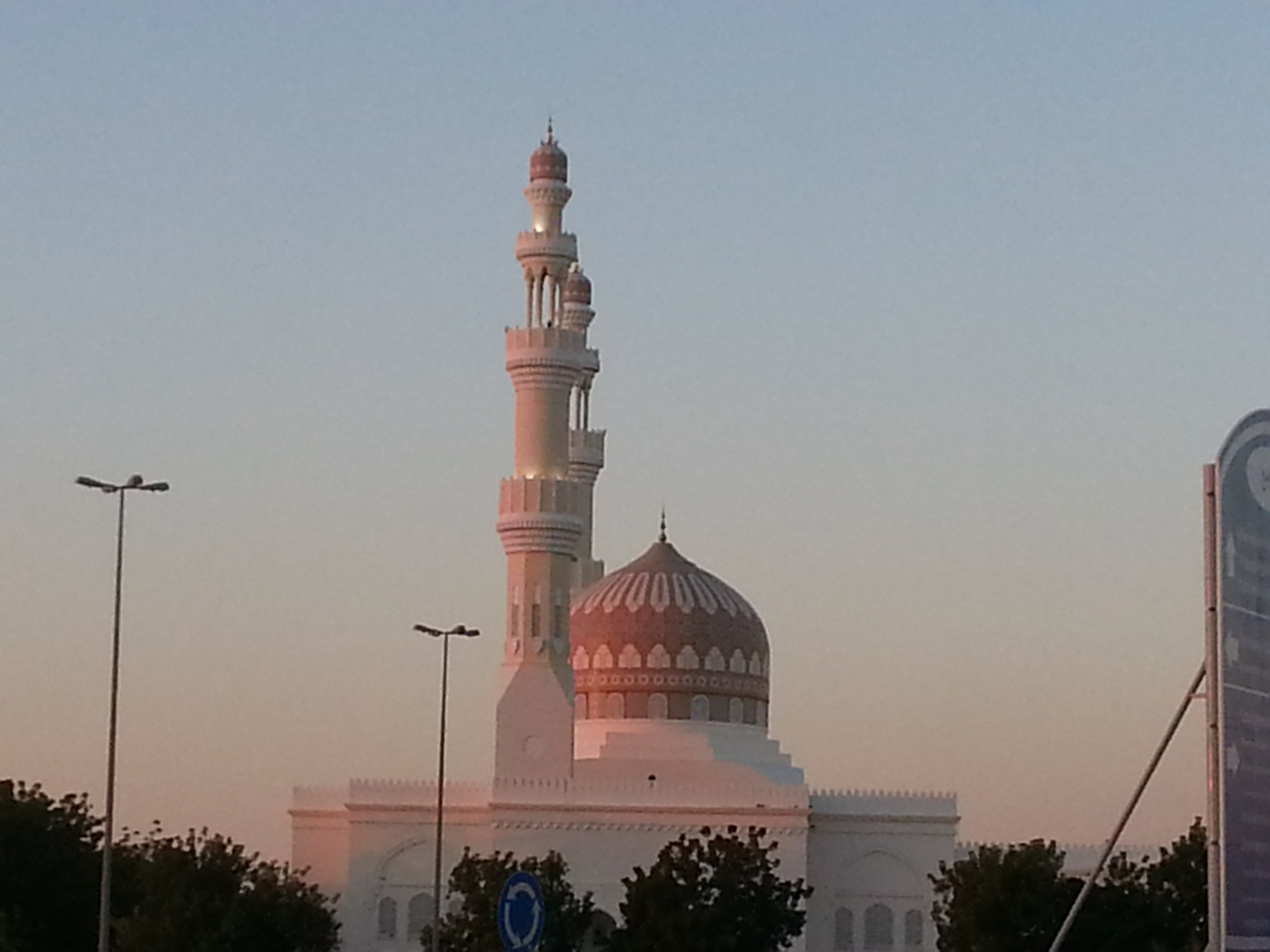
The Grand Mosque

== History and prehistory ==
Being in the region of the Western Hajar, the area of Al-Buraimi and Al-Ain, traditionally referred to as 'Tawam', is of historical and cultural importance. It is demonstrated to have been inhabited as far back as the Hafit period of the early Bronze Age, and according to one author, an oasis in this region and Al-Hasa in Saudi Arabia are the most important in the Arabian Peninsula.

Al-Buraimi was part of Oman from early historical times. From around 600 CE, the Azdi tribes of Oman occupied the area. Then Al-Buraimi town was abandoned in the 700s. The area witnessed events relevant to the history of Islam during the Rashidun, Umayyad and Abbasid eras. The area had come under the rule of the Wajihid Dynasty in the 9th century CE. Al Nuaimi tribe, the original people of the town, rebuilt and ruled it in the 1800s to the 1950s. It had only two rulers, Sheikh Sulṭan bin Mohamed bin Ali Al-Hamood Al Qurtasi Al Naimi, then Sheikh Saqer bin Sulṭan bin Moḥammed Al Hamood Al Qurtasi Al Naimi. The late president of the United Arab Emirates, Sheikh Zayed bin Sultan Al Nahyan, was known to have been brought from Abu Dhabi to Al-Ain by his mother, Shaikhah Salaamah, following the assassination of his father Sultan bin Zayed in 1927. Zayed was raised in a fortified house in the Muwaiji district of Al-Ain. Since 1761, Abu Dhabi was ruled by sheikhs of Al Abu Falah dynasty.

=== Buraimi Dispute ===
The community of Al-Buraimi is probably best known as the result of an incident known as the "Buraimi Dispute." The dispute arose from Saudi Arabia's claim, first made in 1949, of sovereignty over a large part of Abu Dhabi territory where oil was suspected to be present and an area in a 20 miles (32 km) circle around the centre of the Buraimi Oasis. The Saudis relied on historical precedent (the oasis was under Wahhabi influence in the period between 1800 and 1870) for their claims, which were countered by arguments from Abu Dhabi and Muscat based on more recent events.

The argument led to the 1950 London Agreement, whereby exploration and troop movements in the area would continue until the issue of sovereignty was resolved. Despite ongoing negotiations, the Saudis attempted to take back the oasis. In 1952 a group of some 80 Saudi Arabian guards, 40 of whom were armed, led by the Saudi Emir of Ras Tanura, Turki Abdullah Al Otaishan, crossed Abu Dhabi territory and occupied Hamasa, one of three Omani villages in the oasis, claiming it as part of the Eastern Province. The Sultan of Oman gathered his forces to expel the Saudis but was persuaded by the British government to exercise restraint pending attempts to settle the dispute by arbitration.

A standstill agreement was implemented and, on 30 July 1954, it was agreed to refer the dispute to an international arbitration tribunal. Meanwhile, Saudi Arabia embarked on a campaign of bribery to obtain declarations of tribal loyalty on which its case was based. In 1955 arbitration proceedings began in Geneva only to collapse when the British arbitrator, Sir Reader Bullard, withdrew. A few weeks later, the Saudi party was forcibly ejected from Hamasa by the Trucial Oman Levies, a paramilitary group raised by the British. Together with a few refugee sheikhs and their families, the Saudis were taken to Sharjah and dispatched to Saudi Arabia by sea. The dispute was finally settled in 1974 by an agreement, known as the Treaty of Jeddah, between Sheikh Zayed bin Sultan Al Nahyan and King Faisal of Saudi Arabia.

== See also ==
- Eastern Arabia
- Al Qabil, Al Buraimi, village in Al Buraimi Governorate
- Archaeological Sites of Bat, Al-Khutm and Al-Ayn
- Jebel Ghawil
- University of Buraimi
