= Mudaifi =

- Location within United Arab Emirates
- Coordinates: 25°21′42″N 56°20′41″E
- Country: United Arab Emirates
- Emirate: Sharjah
- Elevation: 29 m (95 ft)

Mudaifi is a suburb of the town of Khor Fakkan in Sharjah, United Arab Emirates (UAE).
