= Wadi Shie =

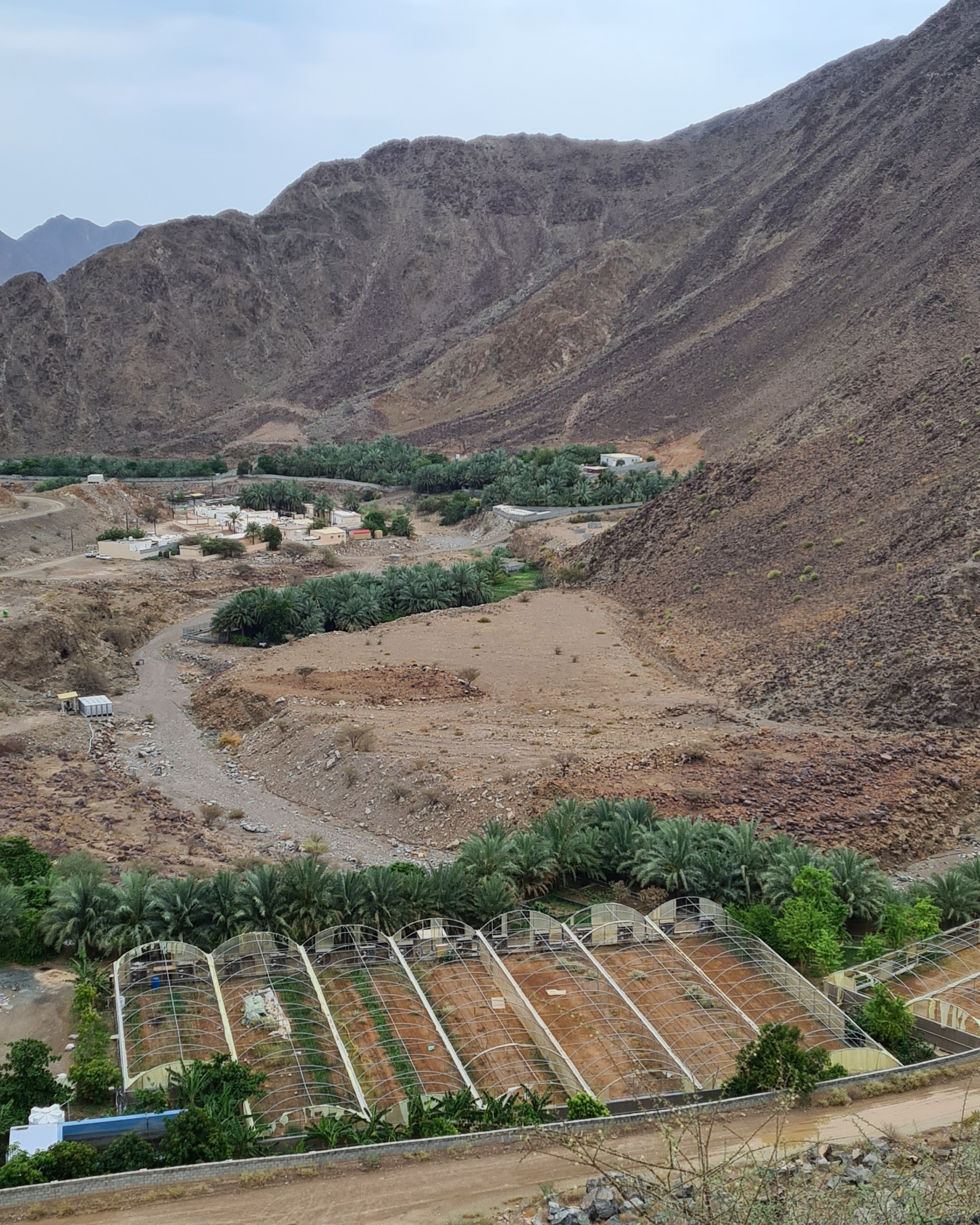

- Location within United Arab Emirates

Physical characteristics
- Mouth
  - coordinates: 25°20′50.5″N 56°19′38.4″E

Wadi Shie is a seasonal watercourse located in the Eastern Hajar Mountains of Sharjah, in the United Arab Emirates.

The wadi runs from the mountains down to meet the coastal city of Khor Fakkan on the Gulf of Oman and is dammed above the restored heritage village of Najd Al Miqsar by the Al Rafisah Dam, a popular tourist spot. Below the dam is the restored hillside heritage village and fort of Najd Al Miqsar. The fort at Najd Al Miqsar formed part of a connected series of fortifications protecting Khor Fakkan, including the Al Rabi Tower and the Al Adwani Tower.

Wadi Shie is the location of the Wadi Shie Archaeological Site, an important collection of petroglyphs that includes zoomorphs (images of horses and camels) and anthropomorphs (riders on animal back). A number of geometric patterns includes a depiction of a ship under sail, a pattern similar to others found in Oman as well as in the Ruus Al Jibal of Ras Al Khaimah. The terraced site is located to the southeastern side of the wadi.

The precise age of the petroglyphs is not known, although they (like others found in the UAE and Oman) bear a striking resemblance to dateable artistic embellishments on Iron Age finds. However, dating is problematic and post-Iron Age dating is also a possibility.

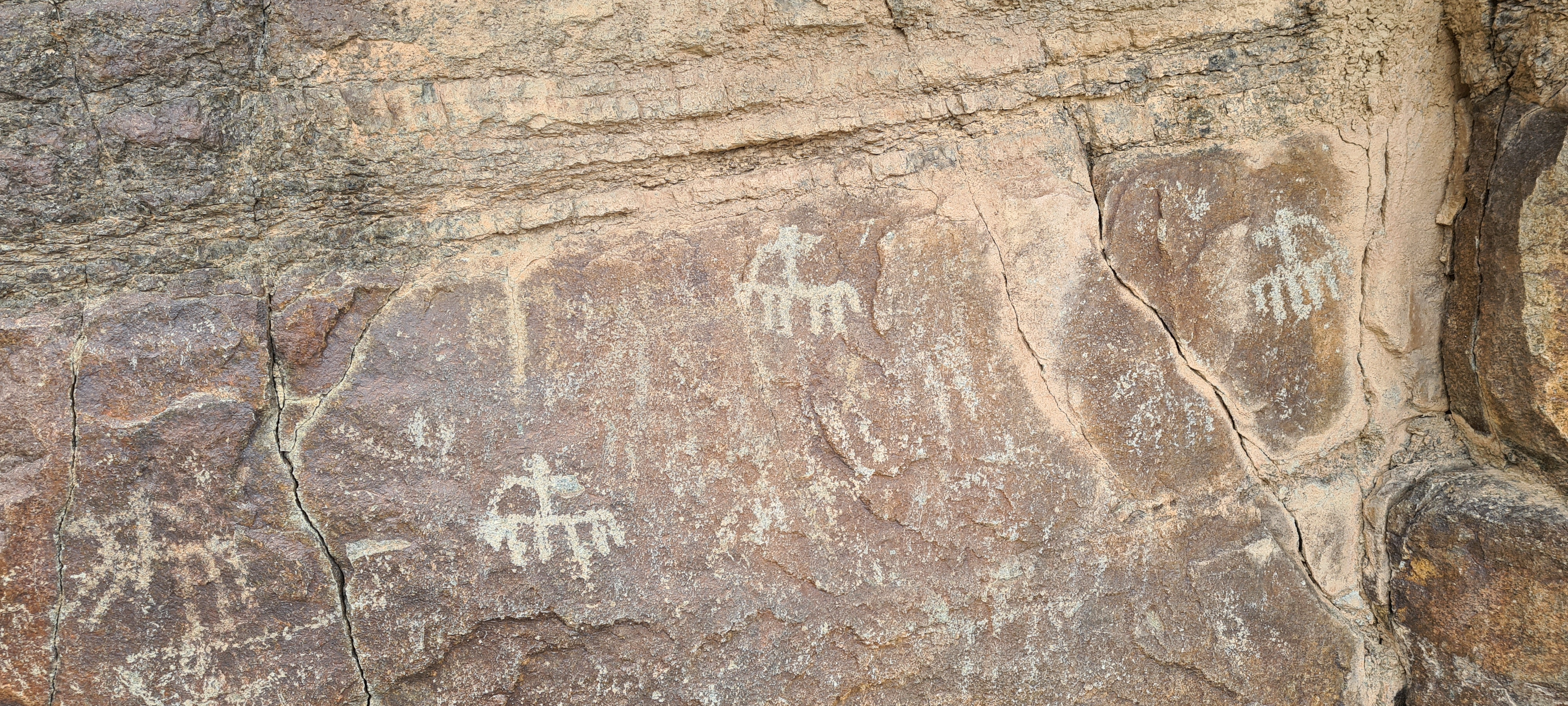
Anamorphic and zoomorphic petroglyphs at Wadi Shie

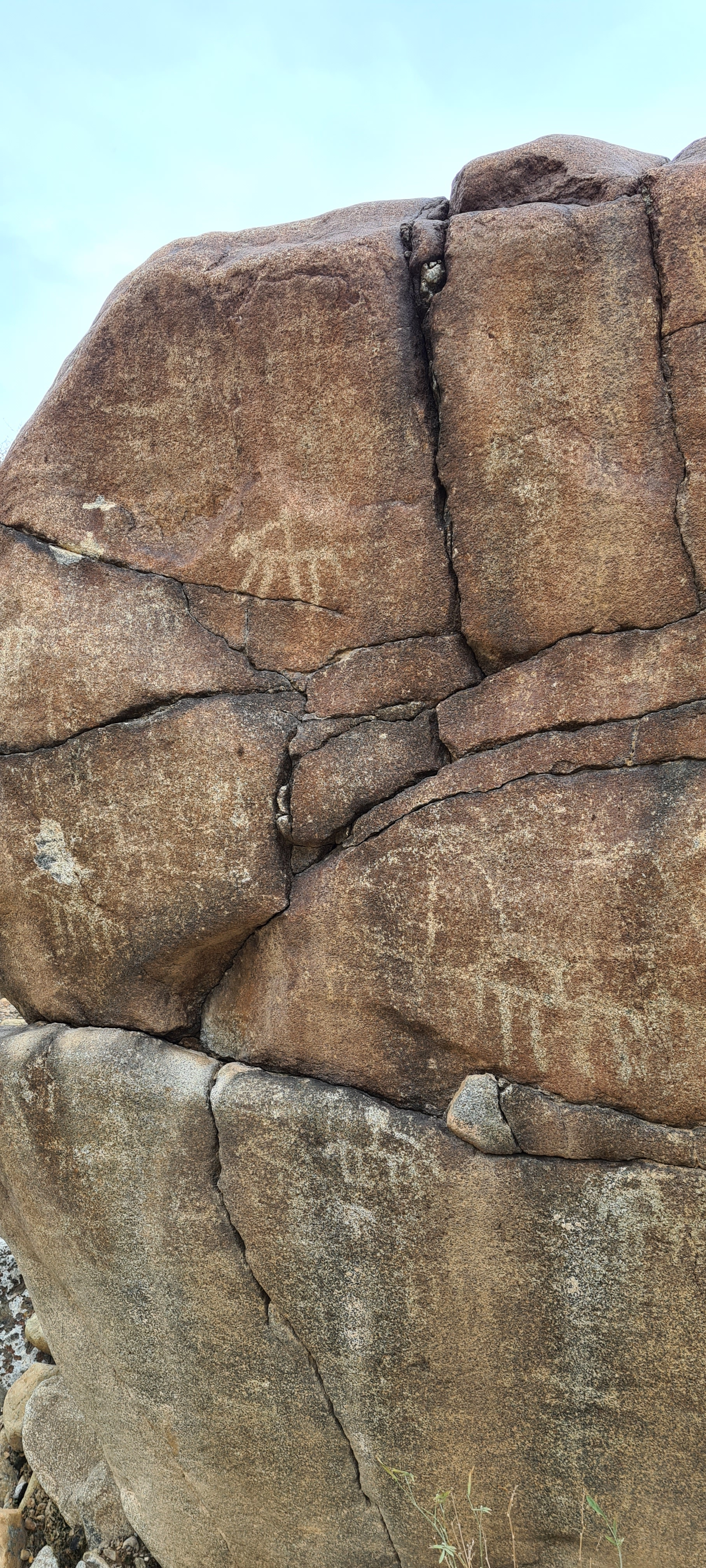
Petroglyphs in Wadi Shie, including horseback and camelback riders.

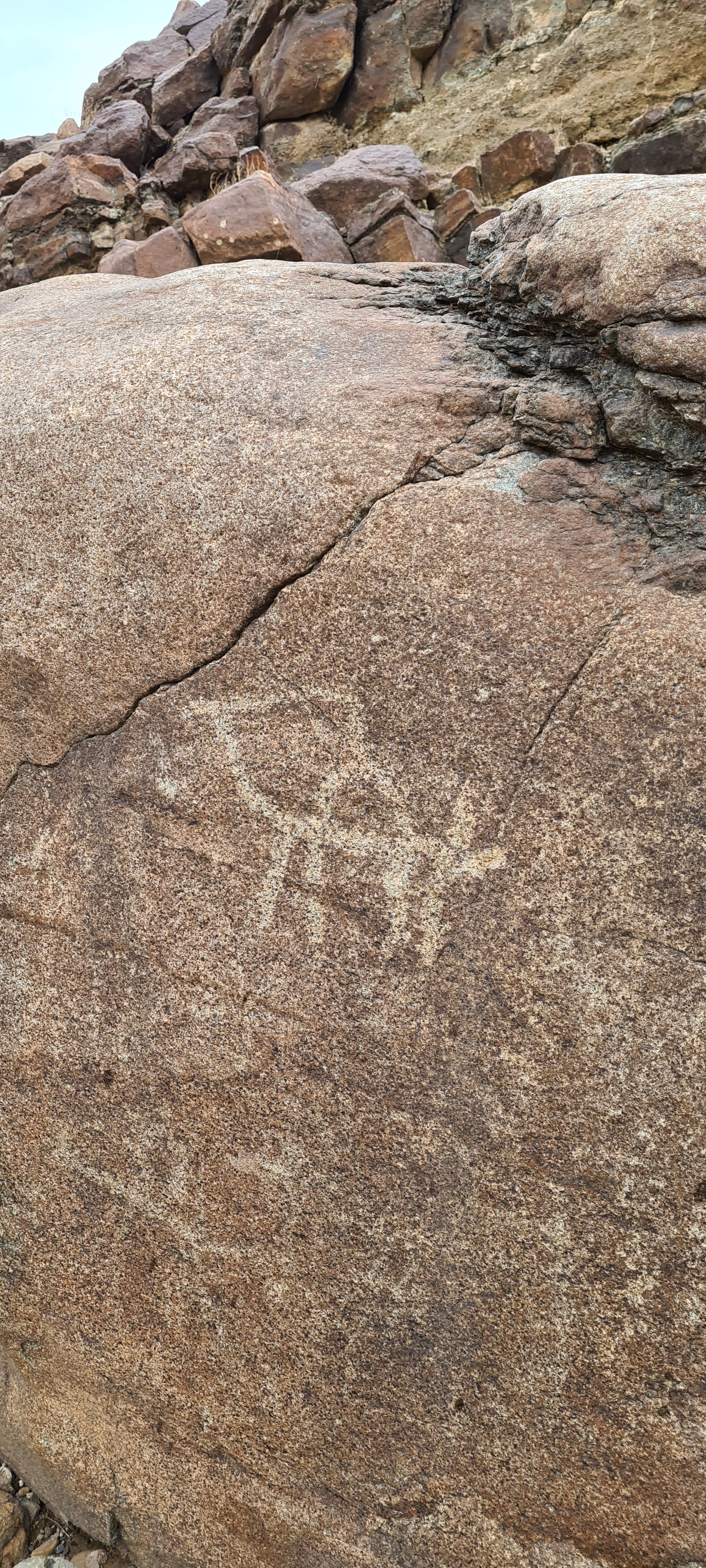
Petroglyphs depicting camels in Wadi Shie

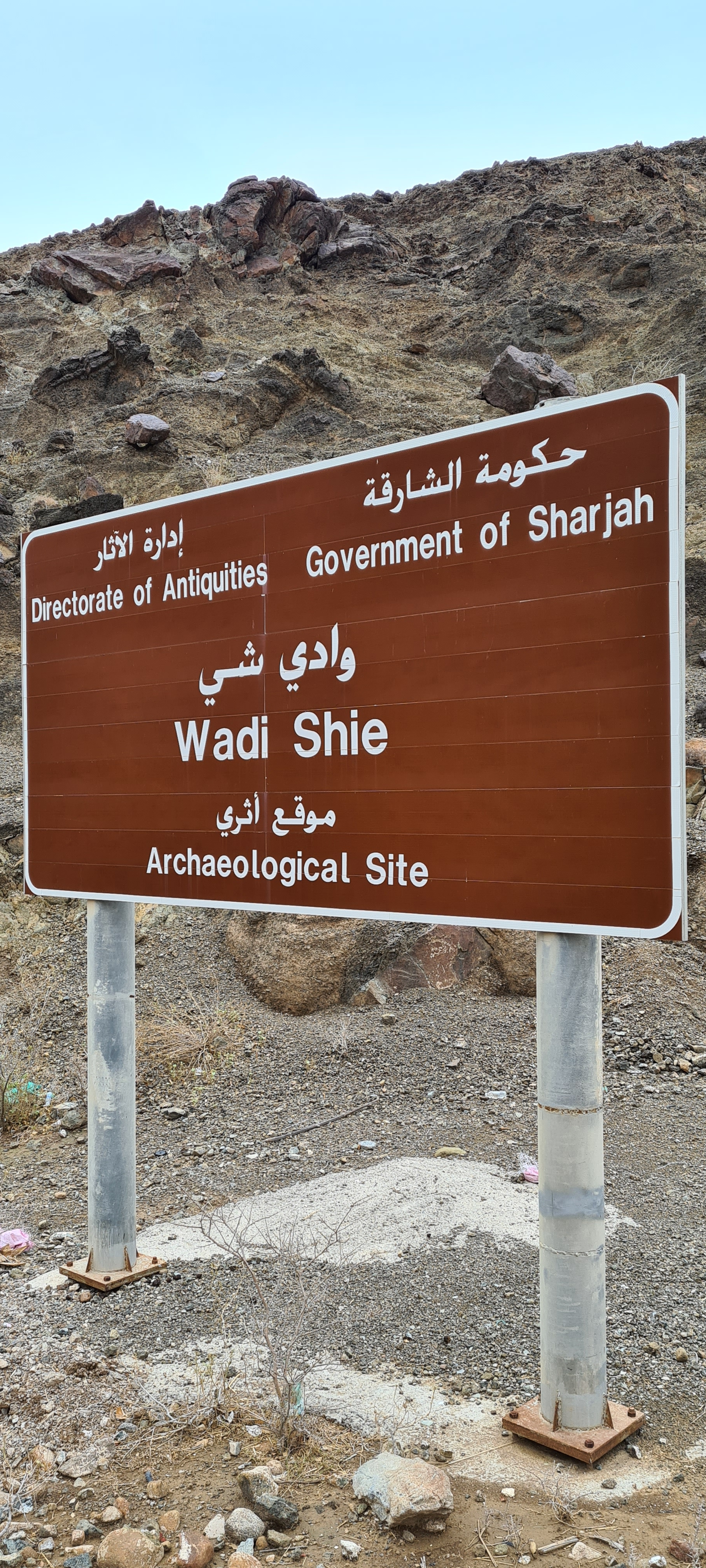
The Archaeological Site in the Wadi Shie is unprotected from the elements save for the sign marking it out.

== See also ==
- List of wadis of the United Arab Emirates
