= Saeed bin Saqer bin Sultan Al-Qasimi =

Sheikh Saeed bin Saqer bin Sultan Al-Qasimi (born January 25, 1962) is the son of the late Sheikh Saqr bin Sultan Al Qasimi, Ruler of Sharjah, 1951–1965. He is a member of the ruling family of Sharjah, which is one of the Emirates that comprise the UAE. Sheikh Saeed is Deputy Chairman of the Amiri Court in Khorfakkan. At the same time, he is the Chairman/President of Al-Ittihad Kalba Sports Club.
