= Shees Park =

Recreational park in the United Arab Emirates

Coordinates: 25.2933610846°N 56.236942300°E

- Interactive map of Shees Park
- Type: Municipal
- Location: Sharjah
- Operator: Sharjah Municipality: Sharjah Public Parks

Shees Park (or Shis Park) is a recreational park near the village of Shis in Khor Fakkan, Sharjah, the United Arab Emirates.The area is directly accessible via Khorfakkan Road S142/E55.

The park was constructed in 8 months. It covers an area of 11,362 m^{2}, has a 25-meter-high artificial waterfall and includes 506 meters of walkways throughout three mountain terraces connected by stone stairs leading to the main viewing platform at a height of 30 meters from the main park level. It includes a children's play area, 32 shaded seating areas for families, an outdoor theater that can accommodate 70 people and a barbecue area.

It was inaugurated by the ruler of Sharjah, Sheikh Dr Sultan bin Muhammad Al Qasimi, on 15 October 2020. During the inauguration, Sheikh Dr Sultan handed over the shops' title deeds to the Emiratis, wishing them success. Shees Rest Area was built on a strategic location that could cater to visitors who are driving through the Khor Fakkan Road to enjoy the mountains. However, there are not much rest spots available, so visitors used to bring water, food, and appropriate footwear with them during their Visit to Sharjah. The area, which is set against the backdrop of majestic mountains, is surrounded with flowers and greenery, too. It includes 58 shops which provides variety of goods, including groceries, carpets, travel tools, perfumes, and many more, restaurants and cafés.

== Gallery ==
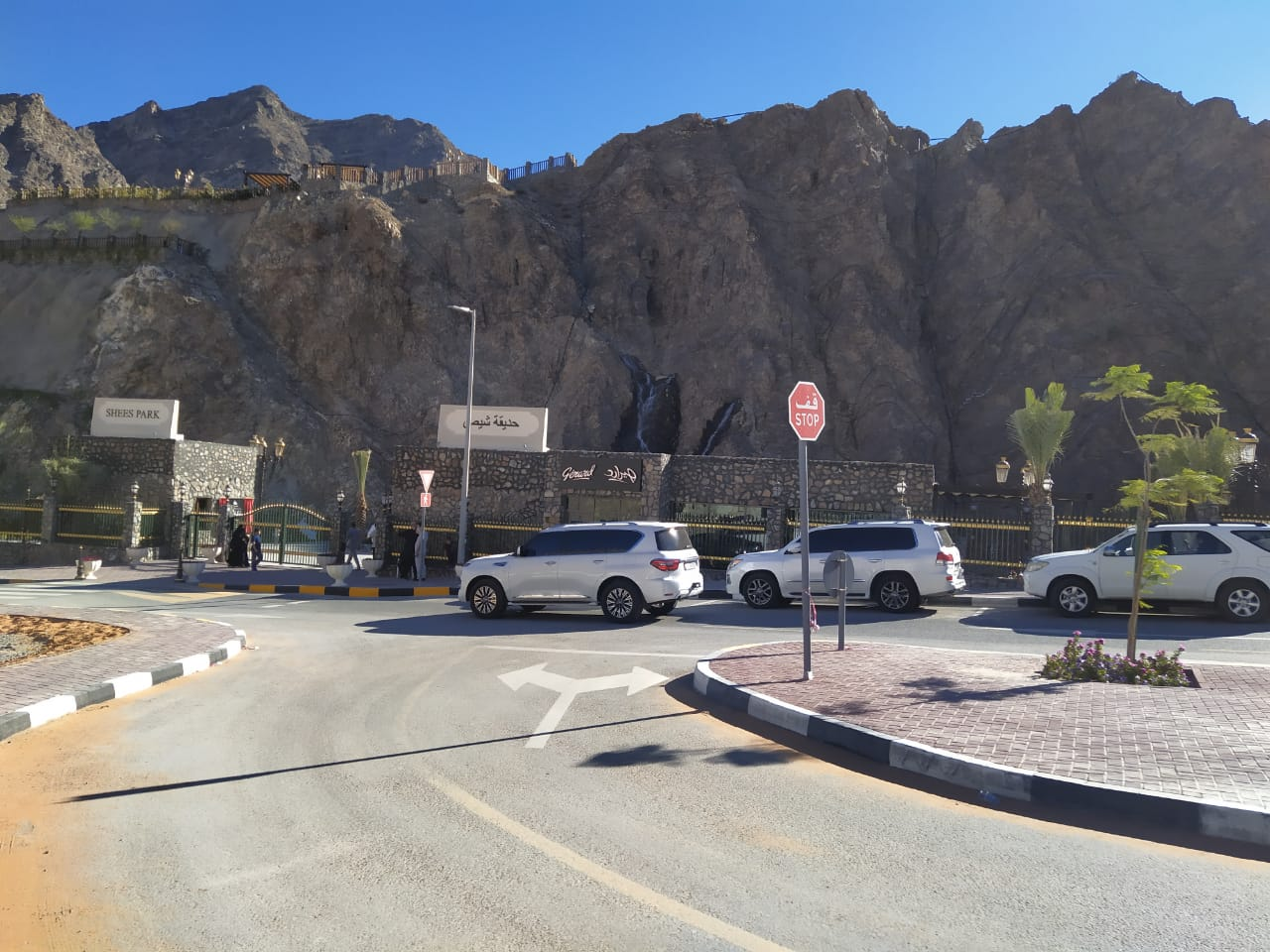
Shees Park Entrance

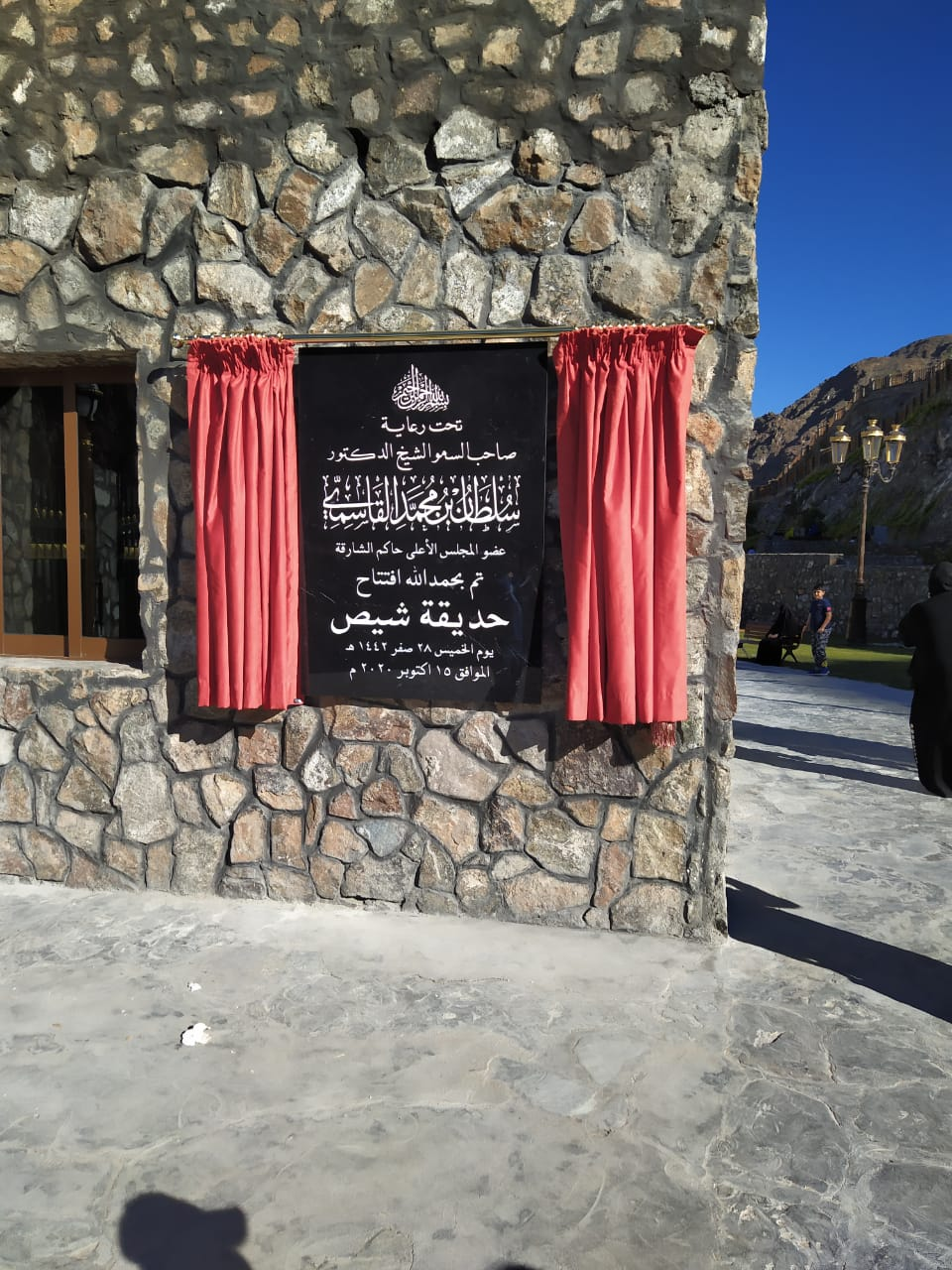
Arabic Plaque describing date of inauguration

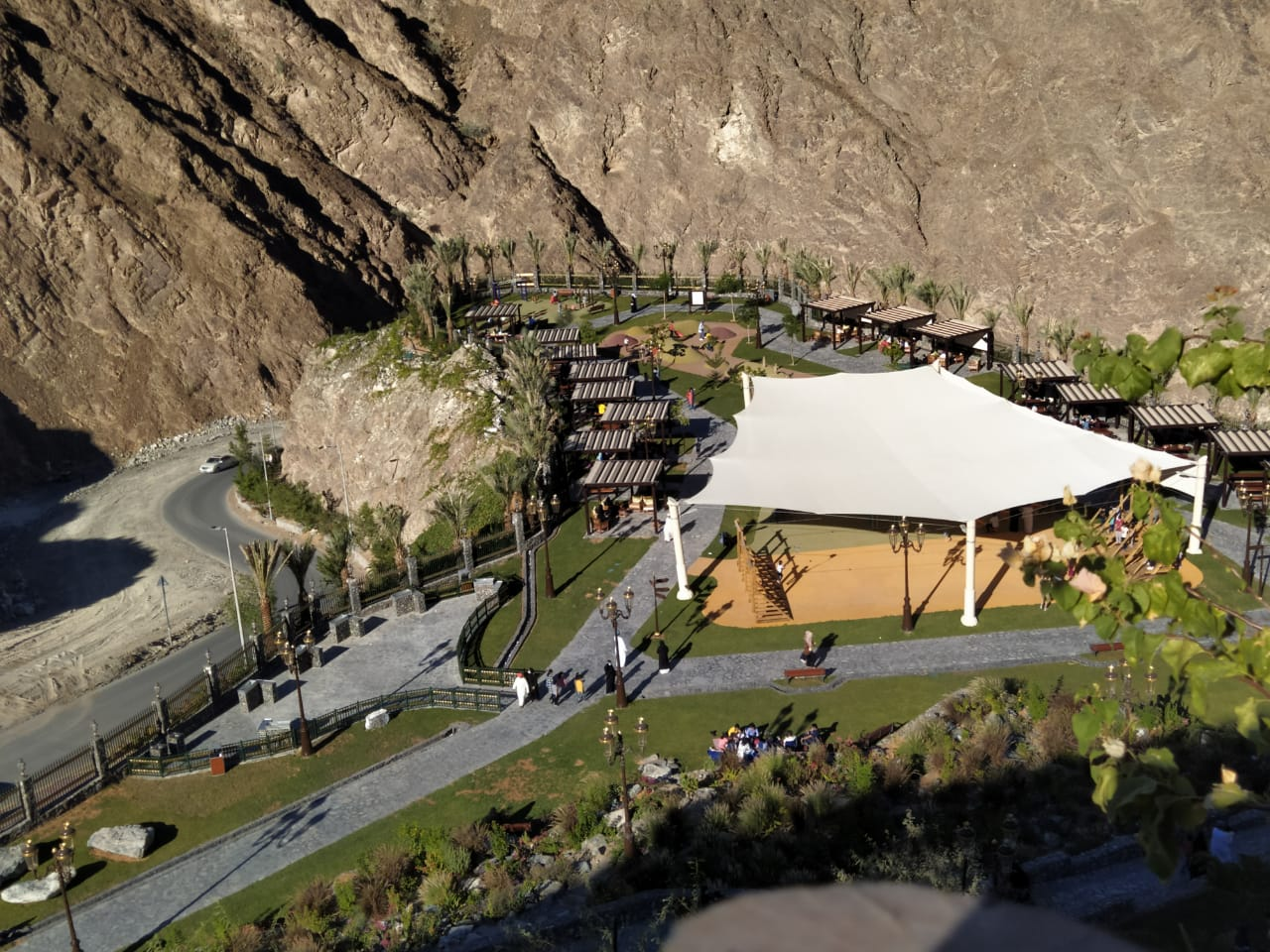
View from Mountain Walkway

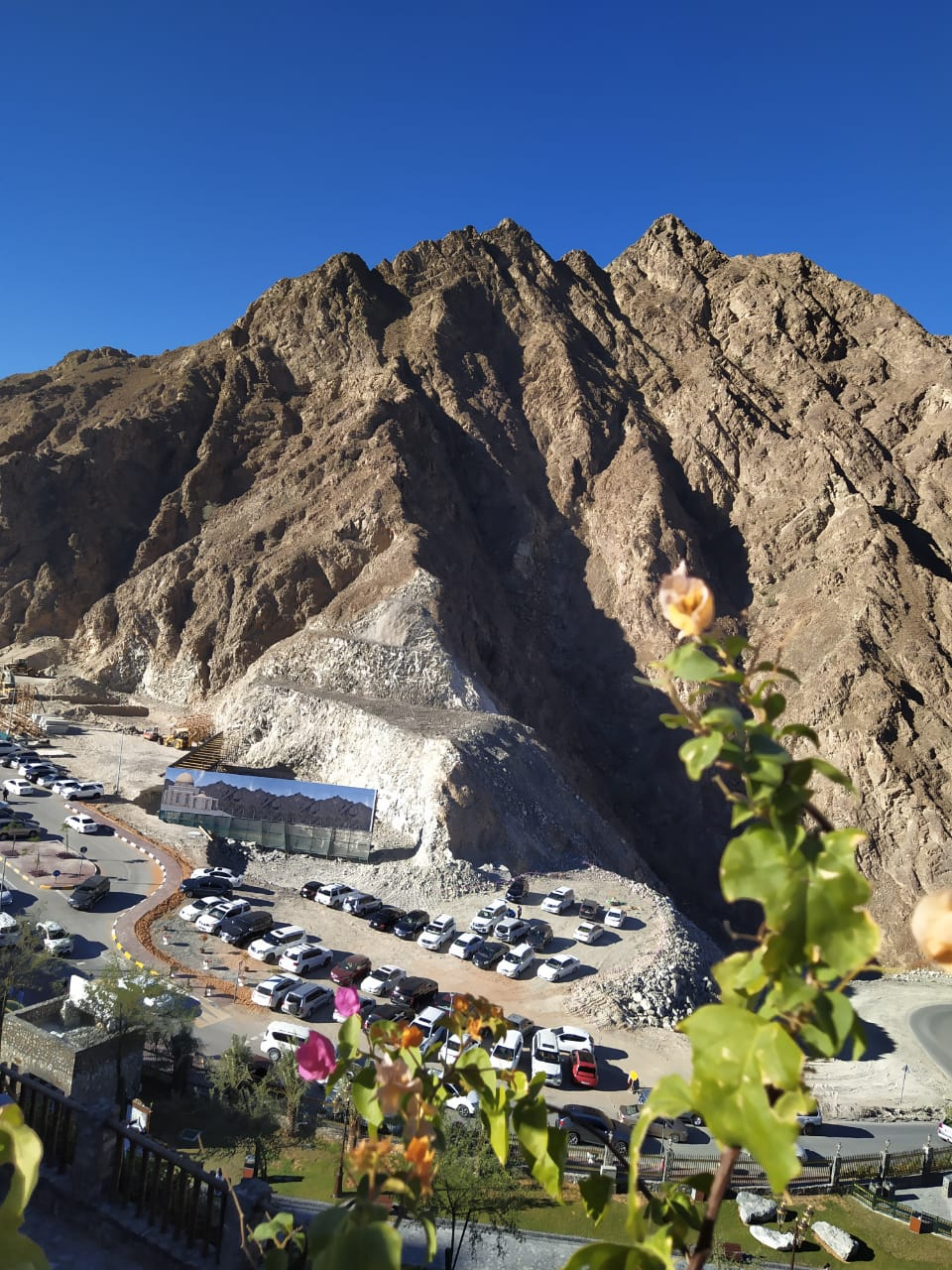
View from Mountain Walkway

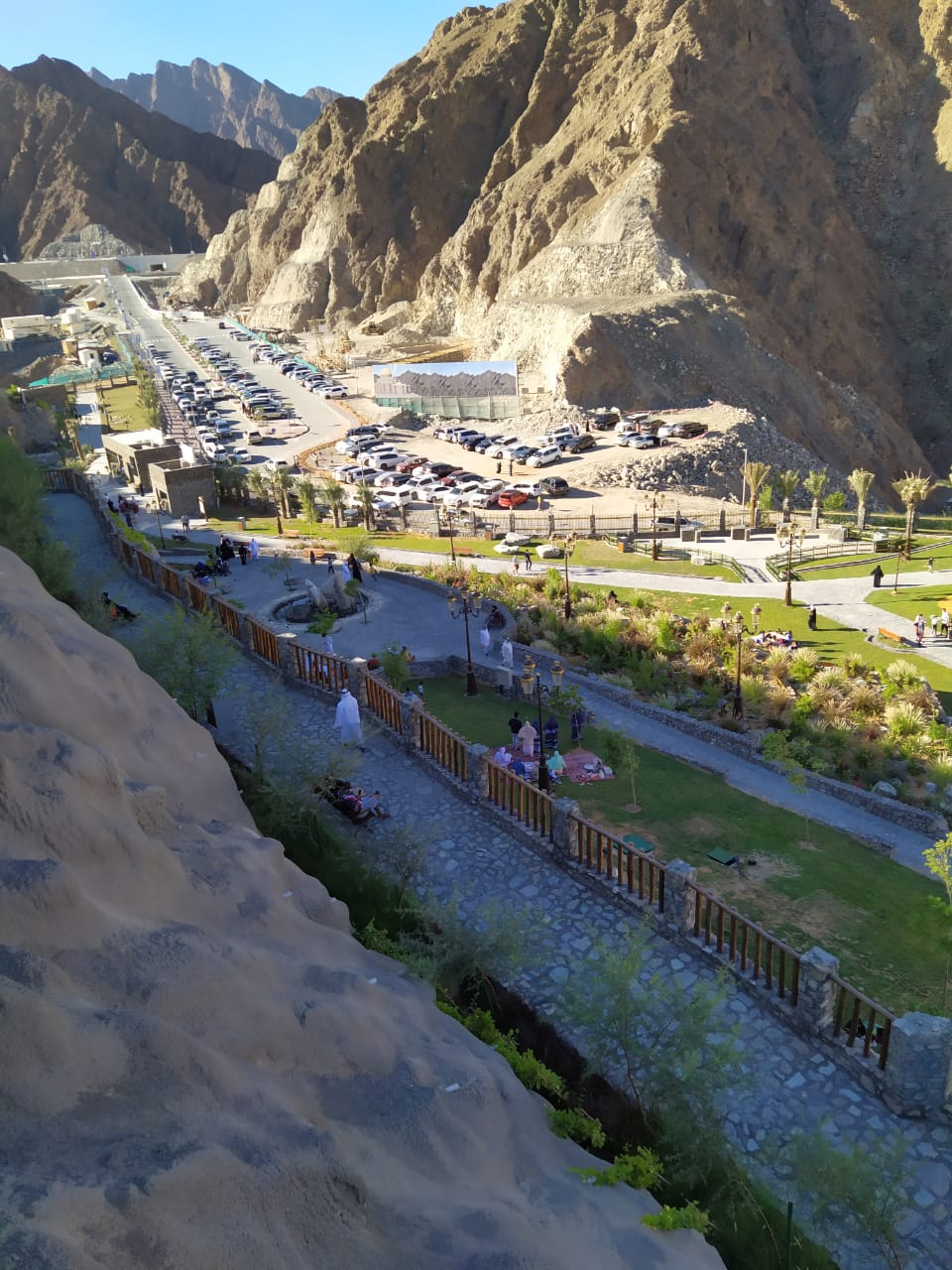
View from Mountain Walkway

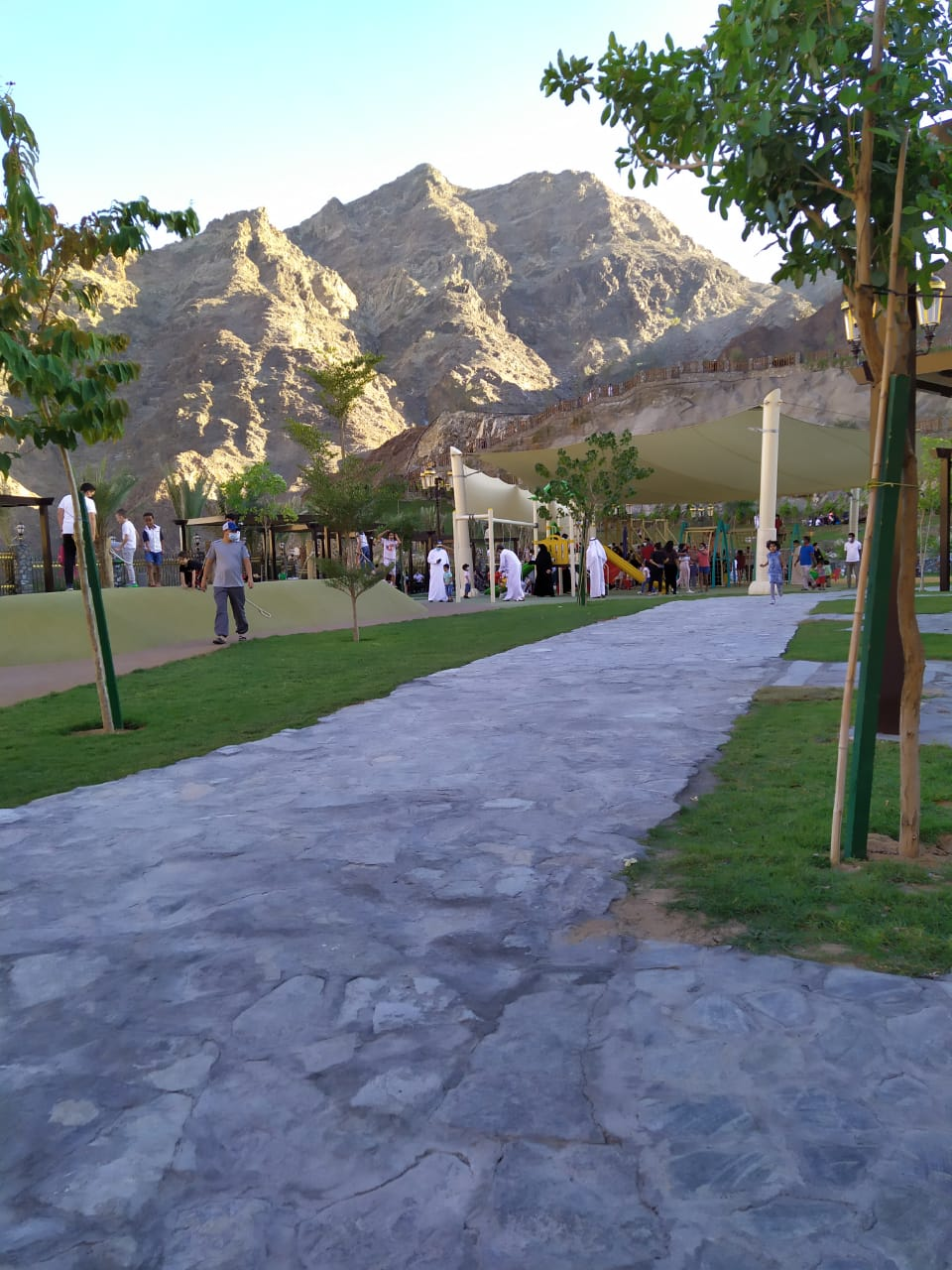
One of the Pathways

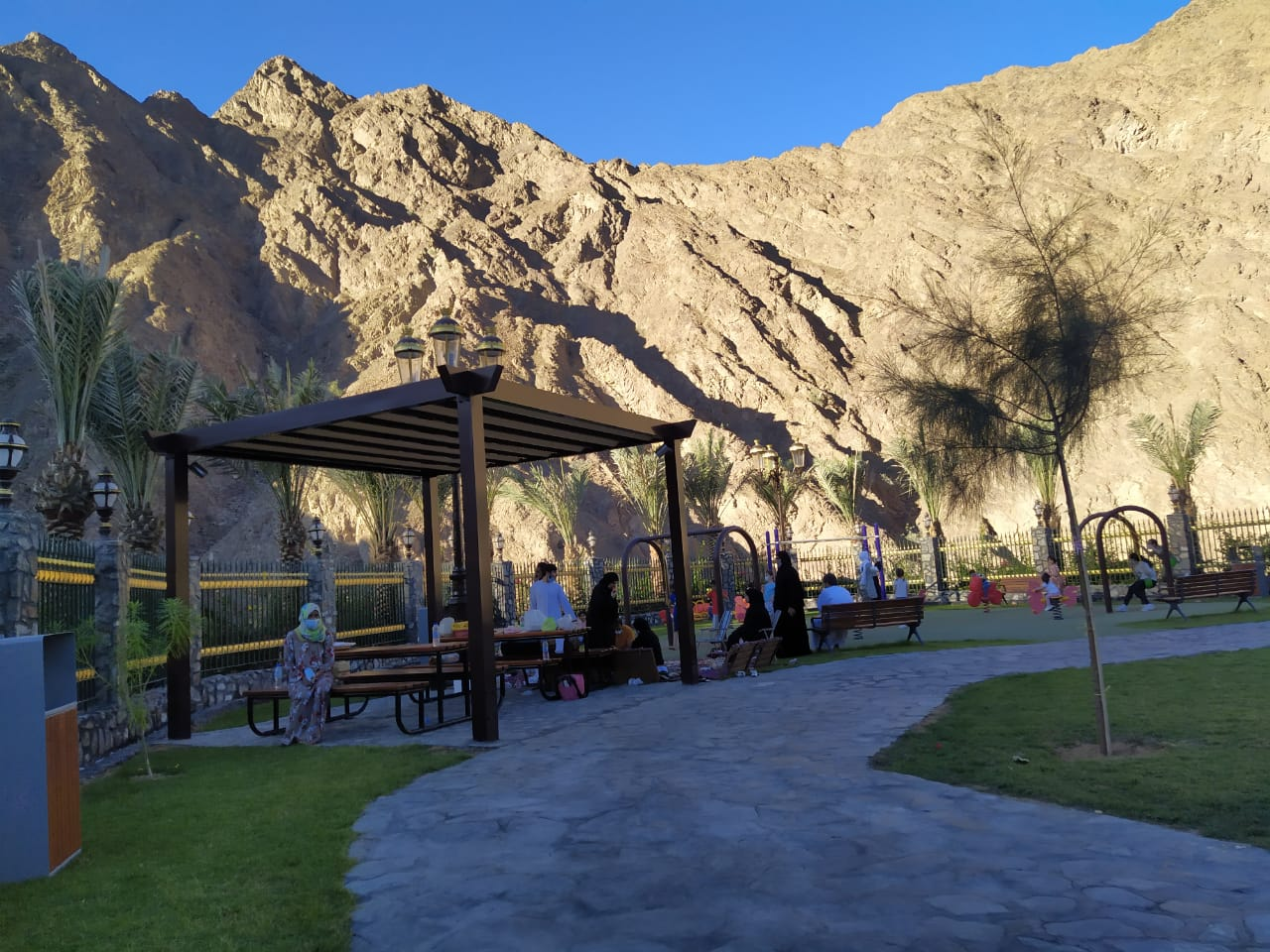
One of the seating areas

== See also ==
- Sharjah National Park
- Jebel Hafeet National Park, Abu Dhabi
- Mangrove National Park, Abu Dhabi
