= Khor Fakkan Amphitheatre =

Open-air theatre

Coordinates: 25.36784°N 56.34748°E

- Interactive map of Khor Fakkan Amphitheatre
- Type: Municipal
- Location: Khorfakkan
- Operator: Fujeirah Municipality

The Khor Fakkan Amphitheatre is an open-air theatre and a cultural landmark in the Emirate of Sharjah, located in Khor Fakkan. This is a Roman style architectural theatre (not an amphitheatre, contrary to its name) which is a semi-circular shape with tiered seating and it provides an excellent views of the stage from all angles.

== History ==
The theatre was opened to the public and inaugurated by the ruler of Sharjah Sheikh Sultan bin Muhammad Al Qasimi on 14 December 2020. In 21 April 2022, the amphitheatre was added to the United Arab Emirates banknotes and was featured on the 10 dirham bill.

== Location ==
The theatre is located at the foot of "Al Sayed" mountain facing the beach of the city of Khorfakkan.

== Dimensions ==
The theatre was built on a total area of 190,000 square feet (18,000 m^{2}). It can accommodate 3600 individuals, and includes a cooling system. The semicircular structure has a stone facade includes 234 arches and 295 columns and is situated on an elevated hillock. The lobby is equipped with six main elevators, divided into two entrances with three elevators for each entrance and also it accommodates people with special needs. There is a waterfall built next to it, which is 45 metres (148 feet) long and 11 metres (36 feet) wide, and is located at a height of 43 metres (141 feet) above sea level. This waterfall is linked to the Khor fakkan Amphitheatre through elevators and a walkway that allows visitors to spend a good time together.
