= Najd Al Miqsar =

- Location within United Arab Emirates
- Coordinates: 25°21′0″N 56°18′0″E
- Country: United Arab Emirates
- Emirate: Sharjah
- Elevation: 220 m (720 ft)

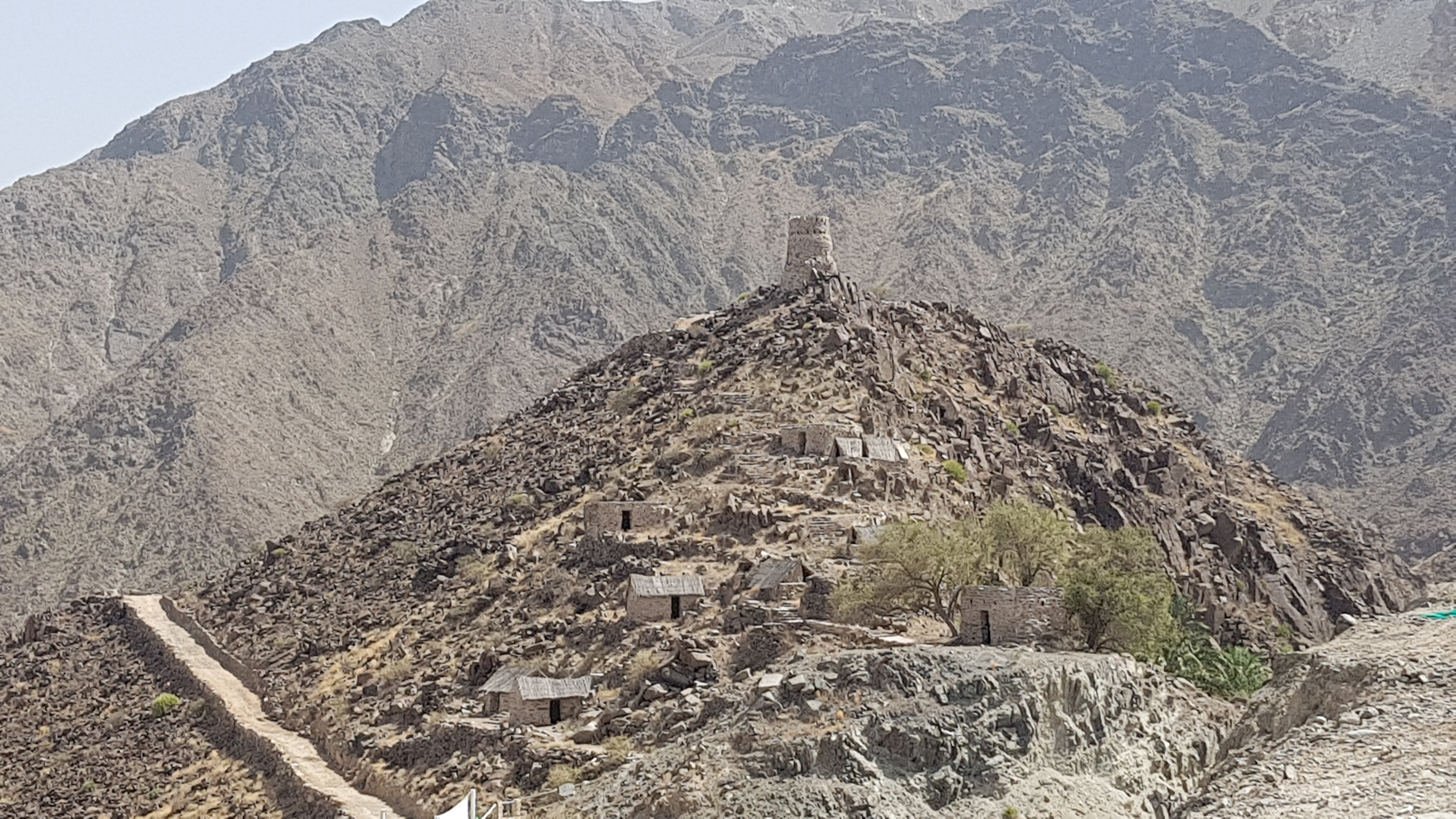
The restored village and watchtower of Al Miqsar at the head of the Wadi Shie.

Najd Al Miqsar is a historical abandoned settlement west of Khor Fakkan in Sharjah, United Arab Emirates (UAE). It sits on top of Wadi Shie mountains and overlooks the city of Khor Fakkan. It is now a heritage village and popular tourist spot, showcasing the past traditional housing lifestyle, local agricultural and community practices.

== History ==
Najd Al Miqsar is located within the settlement area of Khor Fakkan. It consists of a historical fort and 13 houses that are a 100 years old. Within its vicinity, rock art with symbols and images of animals dating back to about 2000 BC were discovered.

A traditional village at the head of the Wadi Shie, which is dammed by the Al Rafisah Dam, Najd Al Miqsar was restored as a heritage village following the construction of the Sharjah-Khor Fakkan highway and the dam and associated rest area in 2020. The area was developed as part of the AED 5.5 billion highway project. The fort at Najd Al Miqsar formed part of a connected series of fortifications protecting Khor Fakkan, which included the Al Rabi Tower and the Al Adwani Tower.
