= Al Rafisah Dam =

- Location within United Arab Emirates
- Coordinates: 25°21′0″N 56°18′0″E
- Country: United Arab Emirates
- Emirate: Sharjah
- Elevation: 197 m (646 ft)

Al Rafisah Dam (Arabic: سدّ اٱرَّفِيْصَة, romanized: Sudd Ar-Rafīṣah) is a dam in Sharjah, United Arab Emirates. It dams the Wadi Shie, a seasonal waterway in the Hajar Mountains that runs down to the city of Khor Fakkan on the east coast of Sharjah.

== History ==
The dam was built in the 1980s at the same time as the Khor Fakkan Dam under a $63 million contract. The recreational area was built decades later as part of the Sharjah-Khor Fakkan highway project.

== Description ==
The development of Al Rafisah spans an area of 10,684 square metres, and includes prayer facilities, outdoor seating area for 300 people, car parking for 45 vehicles, walkways, and three play areas over some 410 sqm. It is originally built in the 1980s and holds the waters of the Wadi Shees, a river that flows down through the Hajar mountains. The rest area and tourist facilities were built alongside the dam as part of the Sharjah-Khor Fakkan highway (S 142) project, a 14-year project to connect the interior of Sharjah with the UAE's east coast. The project included the restoration of the Heritage village of Najd Al Miqsar.

The dam is an area rich in local flora and fauna, including the Little Grebe and other migrating and wintering birds, as well as being home to problematic introduced and invasive species, such as Tilapia and the red-eared slider turtle.

During summer, submerged ruins are partially visible.

== Gallery ==
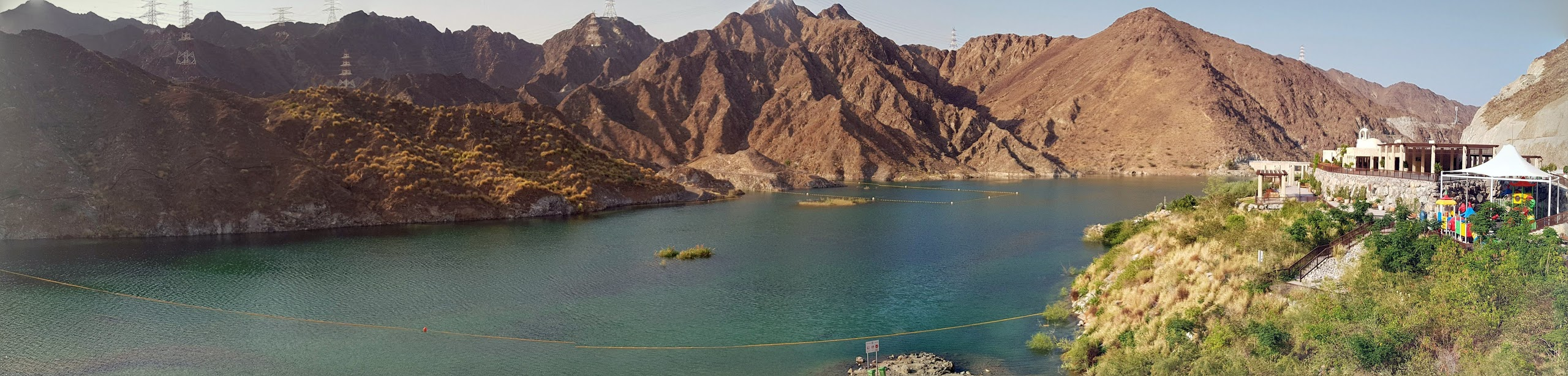
The Al Rafisah Dam at the head of Wadi Rafisah in the Hajar Mountains above Khor Fakkan.

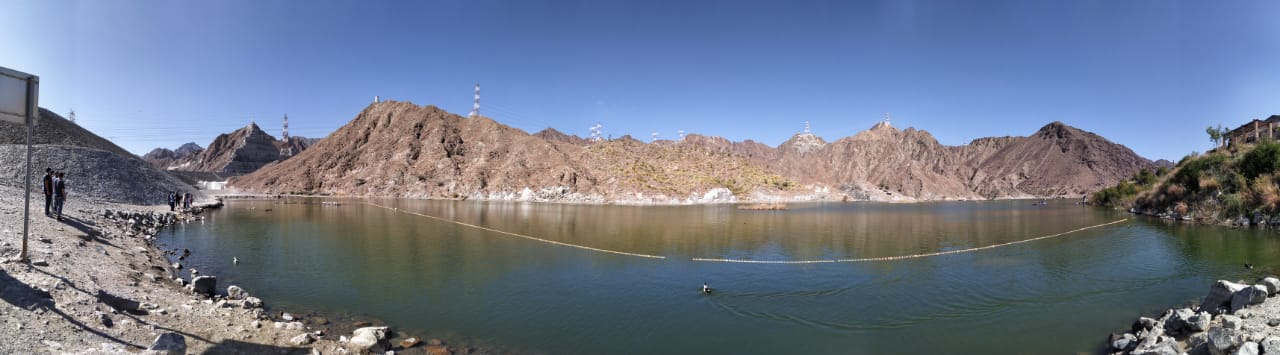
Panoramic view of the Dam
