= Al Suhub Rest House =

Tourist attraction in the United Arab Emirates

Coordinates: 25°21′38″N 56°19′26″E

The Al Suhub Rest House is a tourist attraction in Khor Fakkan, on the East Coast of the Emirate of Sharjah, United Arab Emirates. Located on top of mountains overlooking the city, and forming its highest point, the circular building offers panoramic views of Khor Fakkan and the Gulf of Oman.

== Operation ==
The rest house (also known as the 'cloud lounge') is reached by a 5.6 km roadway cut out of the mountain and is located 580 metres above sea level. The 30-metre diameter building offers 360 degree panoramic views of Khor Fakkan, and houses a branch of the Sharjah Art Foundation's Fen Café and a multipurpose hall, as well as a children's play park.

The rest house was opened by the ruler of Sharjah, Dr Sultan Al Qasimi, on July 15, 2021. It was briefly closed in January 2023 when heavy rainfall caused rockslides to obstruct the access road to the rest house. Heavy rain also forced a closure in July 2022.
