= Hayawa =

- Location within United Arab Emirates
- Coordinates: 25°21′36″N 56°20′56″E
- Country: United Arab Emirates
- Emirate: Sharjah
- Elevation: 0 m (0 ft)

Hayawa is a suburb of Khor Fakkan, in Sharjah, United Arab Emirates (UAE).

Originally a village community in its own right consisting of some 30 families and with arish houses constructed from palm fronds, Hawaya has been subsumed by the expansion of Khor Fakkan and now forms a suburb of the city. An early administrative centre, it was the site of the first medical clinic, post office and schools to be developed in the area. The local economy was dominated by fishing and trade between Kuwait and Africa.

Hayawa was also the site of the first bank to be developed in the Khor Fakkan area. Today it is home to the Souq Al Mirgab and is governed through the Huwaya Suburb Council, founded in June 2021 by the ruler of Sharjah, Sultan bin Mohammed Al Qasimi.
