= Sharjah National Park =

National park in the United Arab Emirates

- مُتَنَزَّه ٱلْشَّارقَة ٱلْوَطَنِي
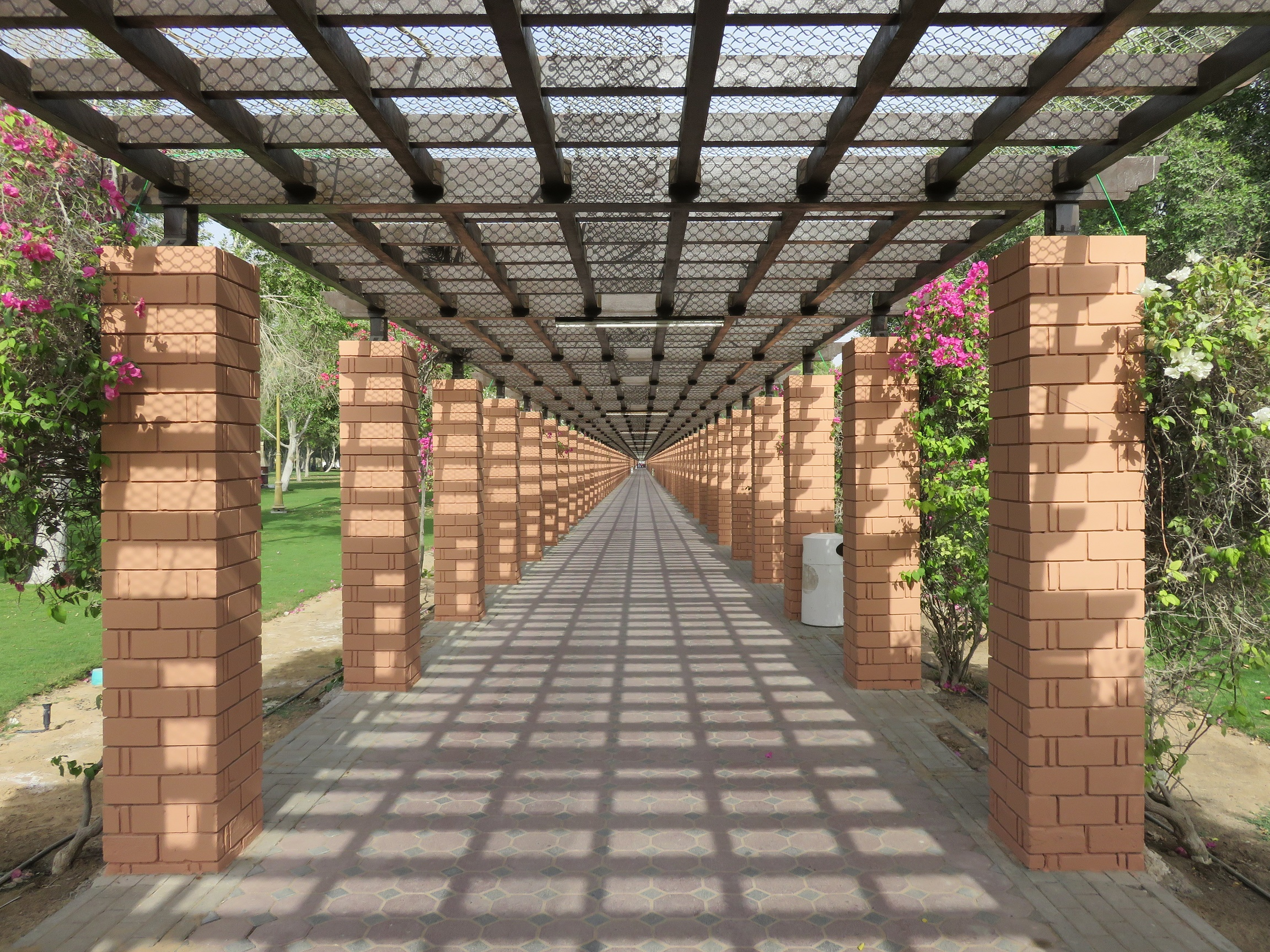
- Interactive map of Sharjah National Park
- Type: Municipal
- Location: Sharjah
- Coordinates: 25°18′46″N 55°32′11″E
- Area: 155.68 acres (63.00 ha)
- Operator: Sharjah Municipality: Sharjah Public Parks

Sharjah National Park (Arabic: مُتَنَزَّه ٱلْشَّارقَة ٱلْوَطَنِي, romanized: Mutanazzah Ash-Shāriqah Al-Waṭanī) is a park in Sharjah, the United Arab Emirates. The park is the largest in Sharjah, covering approximately 630,000 m^{2}.

The park includes many recreational facilities, such as a children's play area, an electronic games area, and sports fields including a football field, a handball court, and a basketball court. It also provides a train that takes visitors on a tour around the park, as well as a duck pond. As for the service facilities provided by the park, they include two cafeterias for eating, public bathrooms, a mosque, and a prayer room designated for women.

== See also ==
- Jebel Hafeet National Park, Abu Dhabi
- Mangrove National Park, Abu Dhabi
- Shees Park
