= Khor Fakkan =

Khawr Fakkan خَوْر فَكَّان
- City
- Khor Fakkan
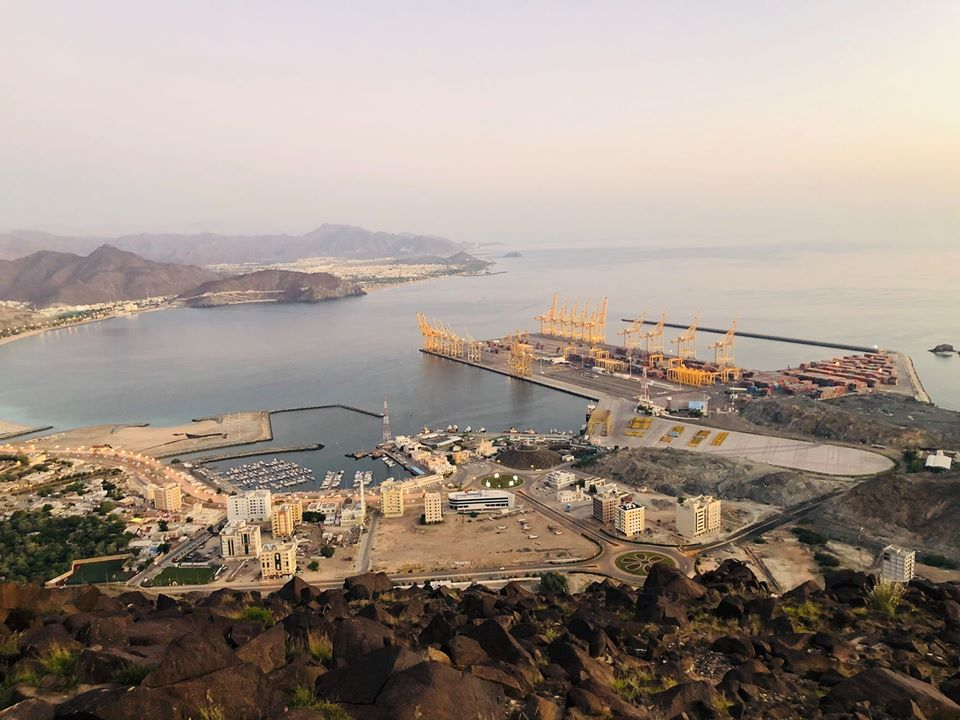
- Khor Fakkan as seen from Al Rabi mountain

- Location of Khor Fakkan
- Coordinates: 25°20′21″N 56°21′22″E
- Country: United Arab Emirates
- Emirate: Sharjah

Government
  - Sheikh: Sultan bin Muhammad Al-Qasimi

Population (2023)
  - Total: 43,223
  - Density: 1,150/km^{2} (3,000/sq mi)
- Time zone: UTC+04:00 (UAE Standard Time)

Khorfakkan (Arabic: خَوْر فَكَّان, romanized: Khawr Fakkān, lit. 'Creek of the Two Jaws') is a city and an exclave of the Emirate of Sharjah, located on the east coast of the United Arab Emirates (UAE), facing the Gulf of Oman (Indian Ocean), and geographically surrounded by the Emirate of Fujairah. The city, the second largest on the east coast after Fujairah City, is set on the bay of Khor Fakkan, which means "Creek of Two Jaws". It is the site of Khor Fakkan Container Terminal, the only natural deep-sea port in the region and one of the major container ports in the UAE. The Port of Khor Fakkan faces the Emirate of Sharjah’s eastern seaboard, extending connections with Asia and the Far East. It is one of the emirate’s three ports.

It is also popular among domestic tourists due to its white sand beaches and coral reefs that attract many marine life enthusiasts. The Khor Fakkan beach lies to the north of the city centre. Khor Fakkan is located on the east coast of the UAE, between the Shumayliyah Mountains and the Arabian Sea, with an altitude of 1,023 meters (3,356 ft) at al Hilqah Mountain (Jebel al Hilqah). The bay of Khor Fakkan faces the northeast and is protected from prevailing winds by a jetty serving terminal for container ships. In the mountains of Khor Fakkan and off the Sharjah-Khor Fakkan highway lies the Rifaisa Dam that is considered to have been built over a village, and thus when the water is very quiet, the tops of the old houses are visible. The development of Al Rifaisa Dam spans an area of 10,684 square meters.

== Etymology ==
Khor Fakkan in Arabic means "Creek of the Two Jaws" which the city is named due to its position in a crescent shaped bay and being flanked by two headlands.

== History ==
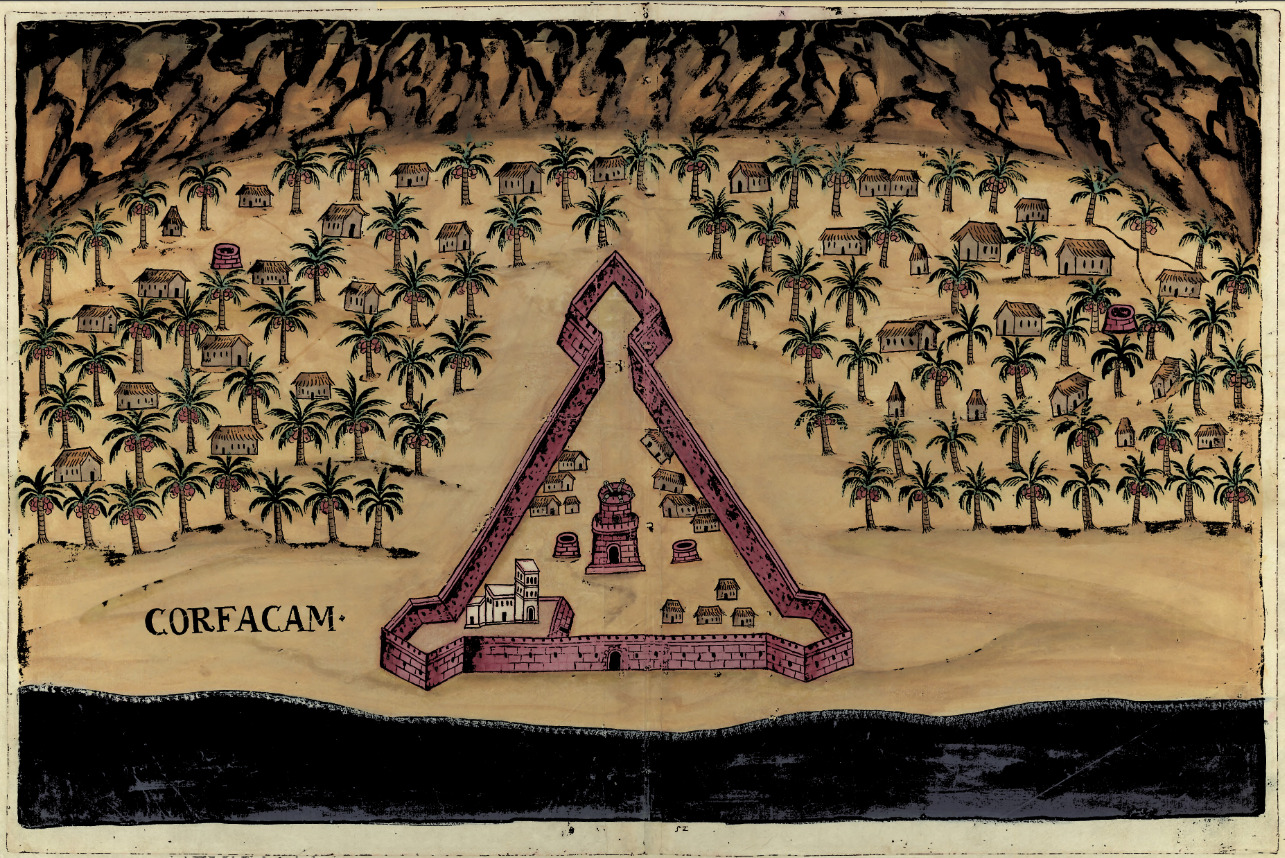
Painting of Portuguese Fortress Khor Fakkan (Corfacão) in 1635.

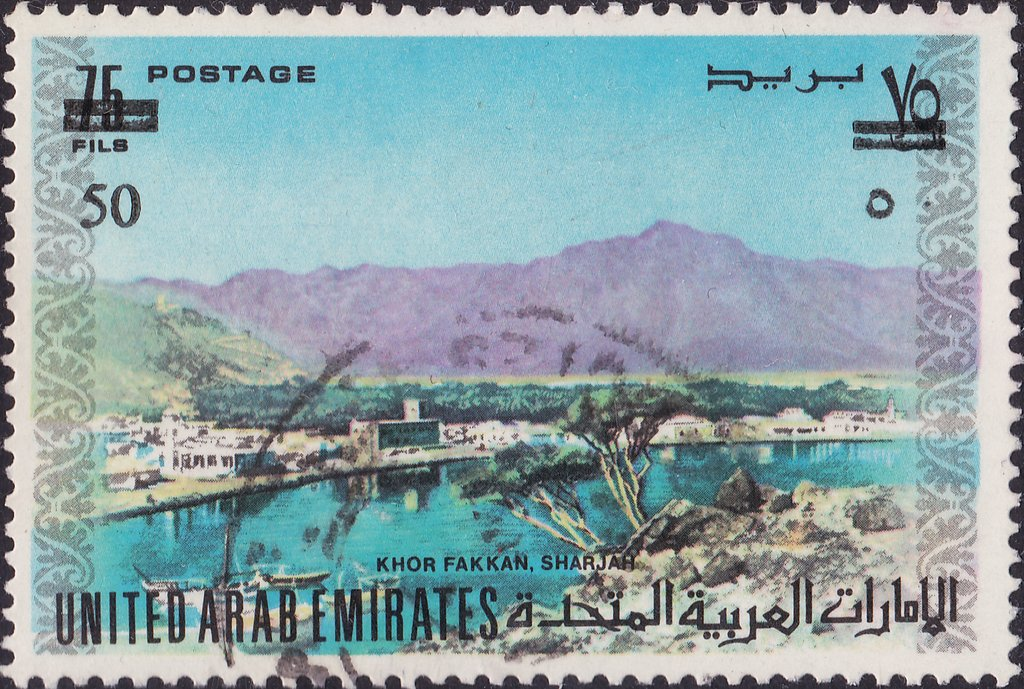
A 1973 postal stamp showing the city of Khor Fakkan.

Khor Fakkan has a long history of human settlement. There is evidence of post holes from the wooden uprights of the traditional barasti huts known as areesh, similar to those found at Tell Abraq which date from the 3rd to 1st millennium BC. Excavations by a team from the Sharjah Archaeological Museum have identified 34 graves and a settlement belonging to the early-mid 2nd millennium BC. These are clustered on rock outcrops overlooking the harbor.

Around 1500, Duarte Barbosa described it as a village “around which are gardens and farms in plenty”. The town was captured by the Portuguese Empire in the 16th century by naval commander General Afonso de Albuquerque and was referred to as Corfacão. It was part of a serial of fortified cities that the Portuguese used to control access to the Persian Gulf and Gulf of Oman, including Muscat, Sohar and Hormuz. At the dawn of the 16th century, it and its port were defended by a wide walled belt facing the land, closing the gorge that, in the mountain range parallel to the coast, allows communication with the interior. In this monumental structure a single door was torn, defended by a tower. The ensemble was responsible for safeguarding eventual tribal attacks.

In 1580 the Venetian jeweler Gasparo Balbi noted "Chorf" in a list of places on the east coast of the United Arab Emirates, which is considered by historians to indicate Khor Fakkan. The Portuguese built a fort at Khor Fakkan that was a ruin by 1666. The log book of the Dutch vessel the Meerkat mentions this fort and another one, describing "Gorfacan" as a place on a small bay, with about 200 small houses built from date branches, near the beach. It refers to a triangular Portuguese fortress on the northern side, in ruins, and a fortress on a hill on the southern side, also in ruins, without garrison or artillery. As well as date palms, the Meerkat's log also mentions fig trees, melons, watermelons and myrrh. It notes several wells with "good and fresh water" used for irrigation. One reason suggested for the ruinous state of the forts is an invasion in 1623 of the Omani navy under the control of Omani Sheikh Muhammad Suhari. Suhari, facing a Portuguese counterattack, withdrew to the Portuguese forts, including that of Khorfakkan. When the Arabs were expelled, the Portuguese commander Rui Freire urged the people of Khorfakkan to remain loyal to the Portuguese crown and established a Portuguese customs office as well.

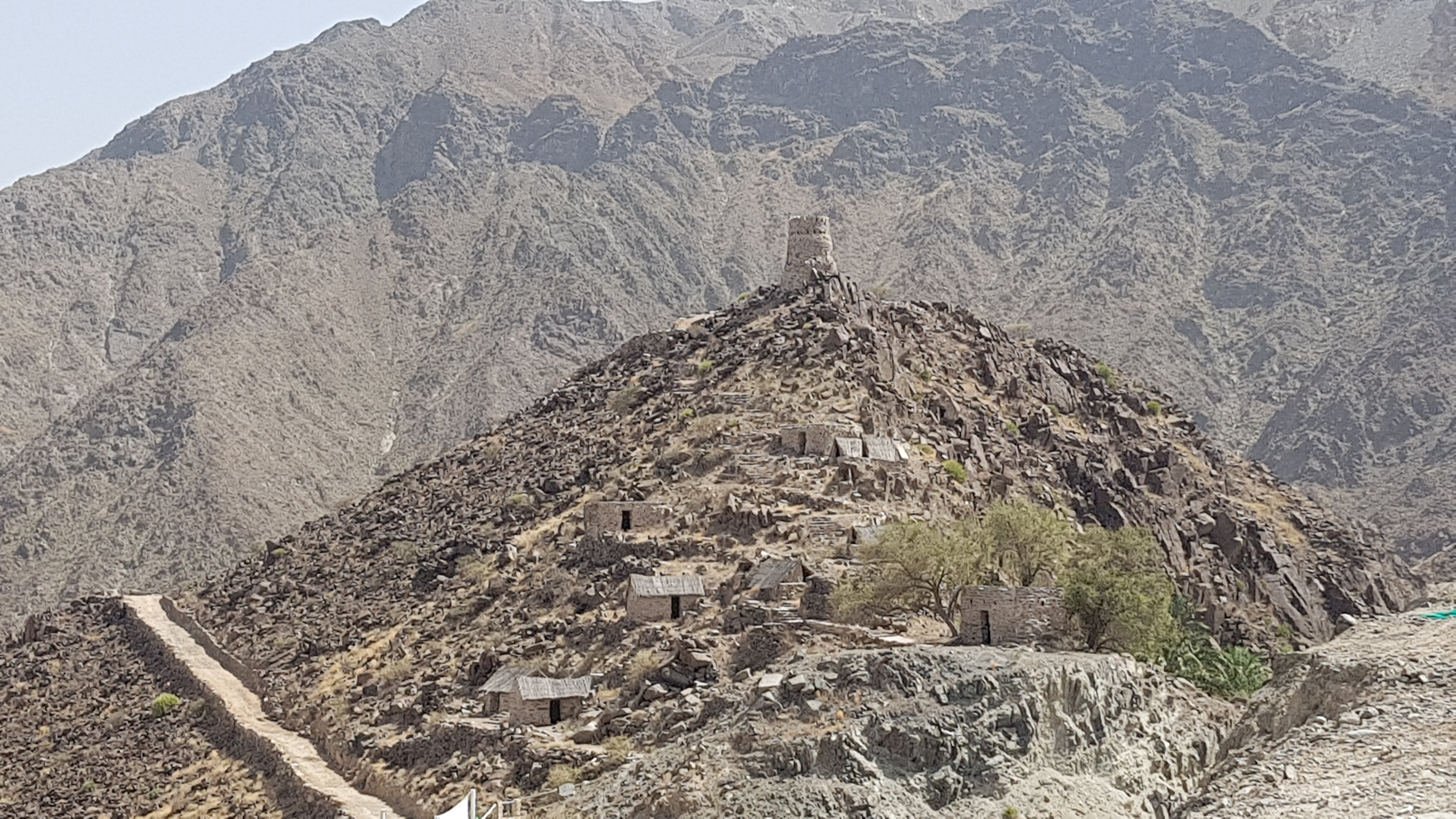
The restored heritage village of Najd Al Miqsar, located in the suburbs of Khor Fakkan, is a popular tourist spot.

In 1737, long after the Portuguese had been expelled from Arabia, the Persians again invaded Khor Fakkan, with some 5,000 men and 1,580 horses, with the help of the Dutch, during their intervention in the Omani civil war. In 1765 Khor Fakkan belonged to a sheikh of the Al Qasimi, Sharjah's ruling family, according to the German traveler Carsten Niebuhr. There is a map by the French cartographer Rigobert Bonne dating to about 1770 that shows the Arabian Peninsula and the Persian Gulf and includes Khor Fakkan.

At the turn of the 19th century, Lorimer notes that Khor Fakkan had about 5,000 date trees and was home to about 150 houses of Naqbiyin and Arabs, amounting to some 800 people. The population lived by cultivation and pearling, and the town had seven shops. Modern Khor Fakkan grew up around the early administrative centre of Hayawa.

The German submarine U-533 sank about 25 miles (40 km) off the coast on 16 October 1943 during World War II. Divers found the wreck at a depth of 108 metres (354 ft) in 2009.

== Port ==
The modern Khor Fakkan Container Terminal was inaugurated in 1979, and is the only natural deep-sea port in the region, and one of the top ports in the Emirates for containers. The Dh 300 million ($81.75 million) project involved reclaiming some 150,000 square metres (1,600,000 sq ft) to increase the storage capacity and to facilitate large cranes, and 16 metres (52 ft) deep quays to accommodate for major vessels over 400 metres (1,300 ft) in length. As of 2004 it handled 1.6 million TEU's.

The port is part of the Maritime Silk Road that runs from the Chinese coast to the south via the southern tip of India to Mombasa, from there through the Red Sea via the Suez Canal to the Mediterranean, there to the Upper Adriatic region to the northern Italian hub of Trieste with its rail connections to Central Europe, Eastern Europe and the North Sea.

== Geography and climate ==
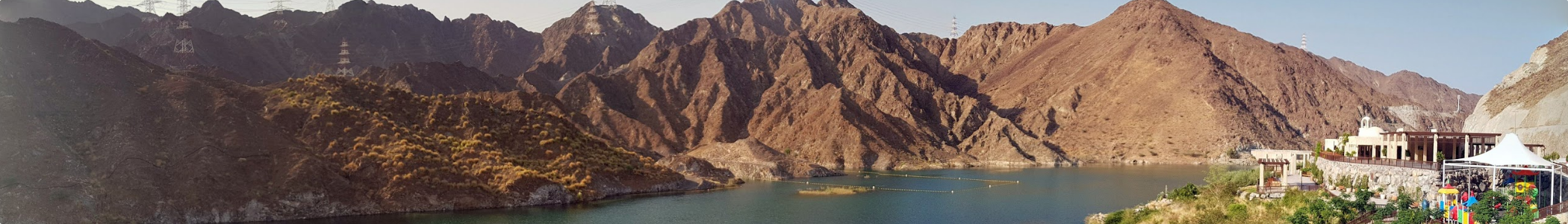
Al Rafisah dam

Khor Fakkan lies on the east coast of the UAE, between the Indian Ocean and the Shumayliyyah or Western Hajar Mountains. The bay of Khor Fakkan is north-east facing and is protected from prevailing winds by a jetty serving the container terminal. Tourism is well developed thanks to sandy beaches and the coral reefs that attract many divers. Khor Fakkan Beach lies to the north of the center of the town.

From November to April Khor Fakkan is sunny and warm during the day; the evenings are cool and humidity low. Daytime temperatures range from 18 to 30 °C (64 to 86 °F). One may expect rain and tropical storms between January and March. The climate warms from May to September with the high temperature at noon in July and August reaching 40 °C (104 °F). The nights too are warm, with the temperature reaching 36 °C (97 °F), with high humidity.

== Landmarks ==
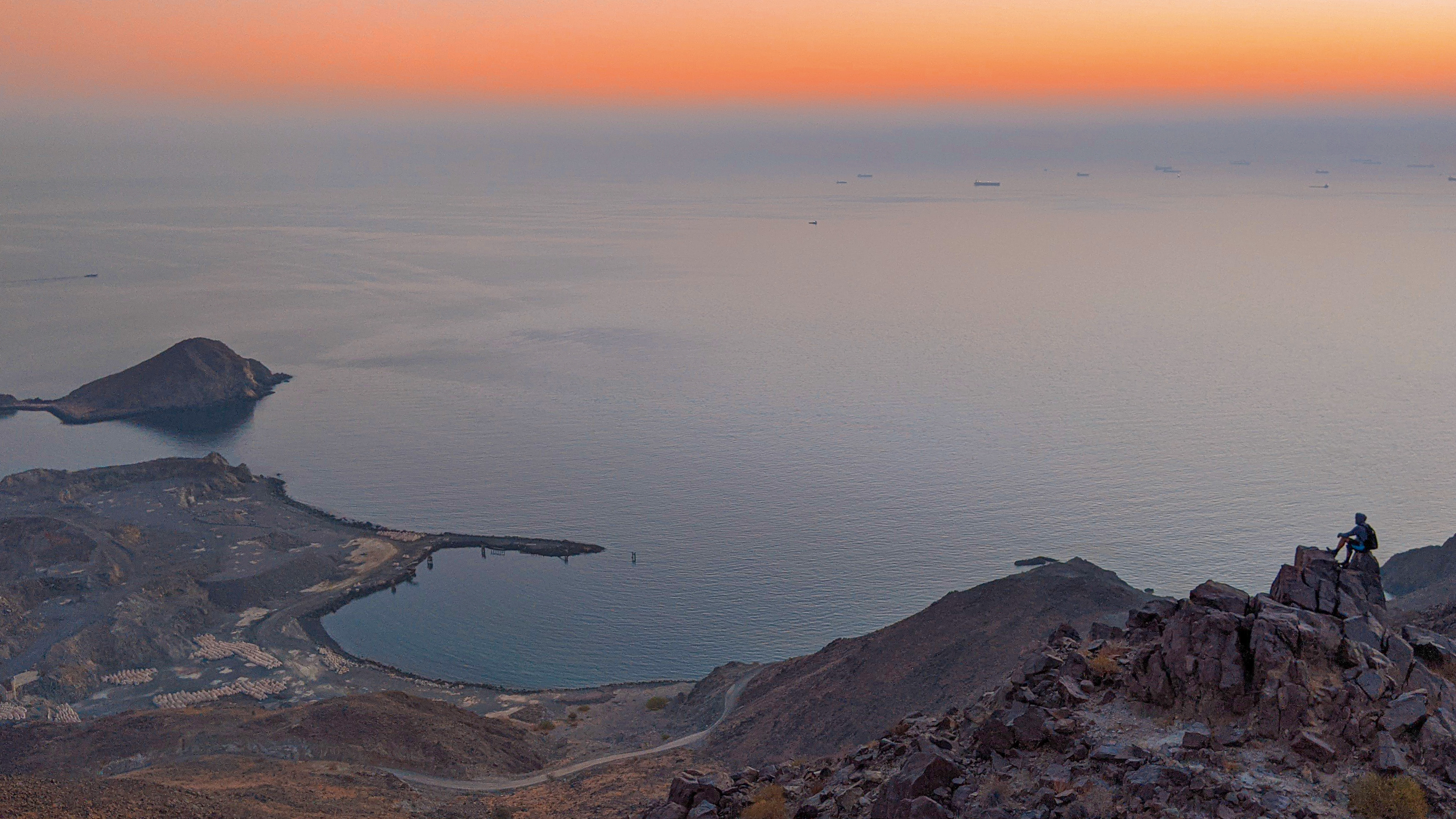
Al Rabi hiking trail in Khor Fakkan

Khor Fakkan has one 4 star holiday beach resort, the Oceanic Hotel. The fish, fruit and vegetable souq is located at the southern end of the corniche and near the main highway. Shees Park, a recreational park is located near the village of Shis. The highest building in the city is the Al Suhub Rest House, which overlooks Khor Fakkan from a height of 580 metres above sea level.

== Gallery ==
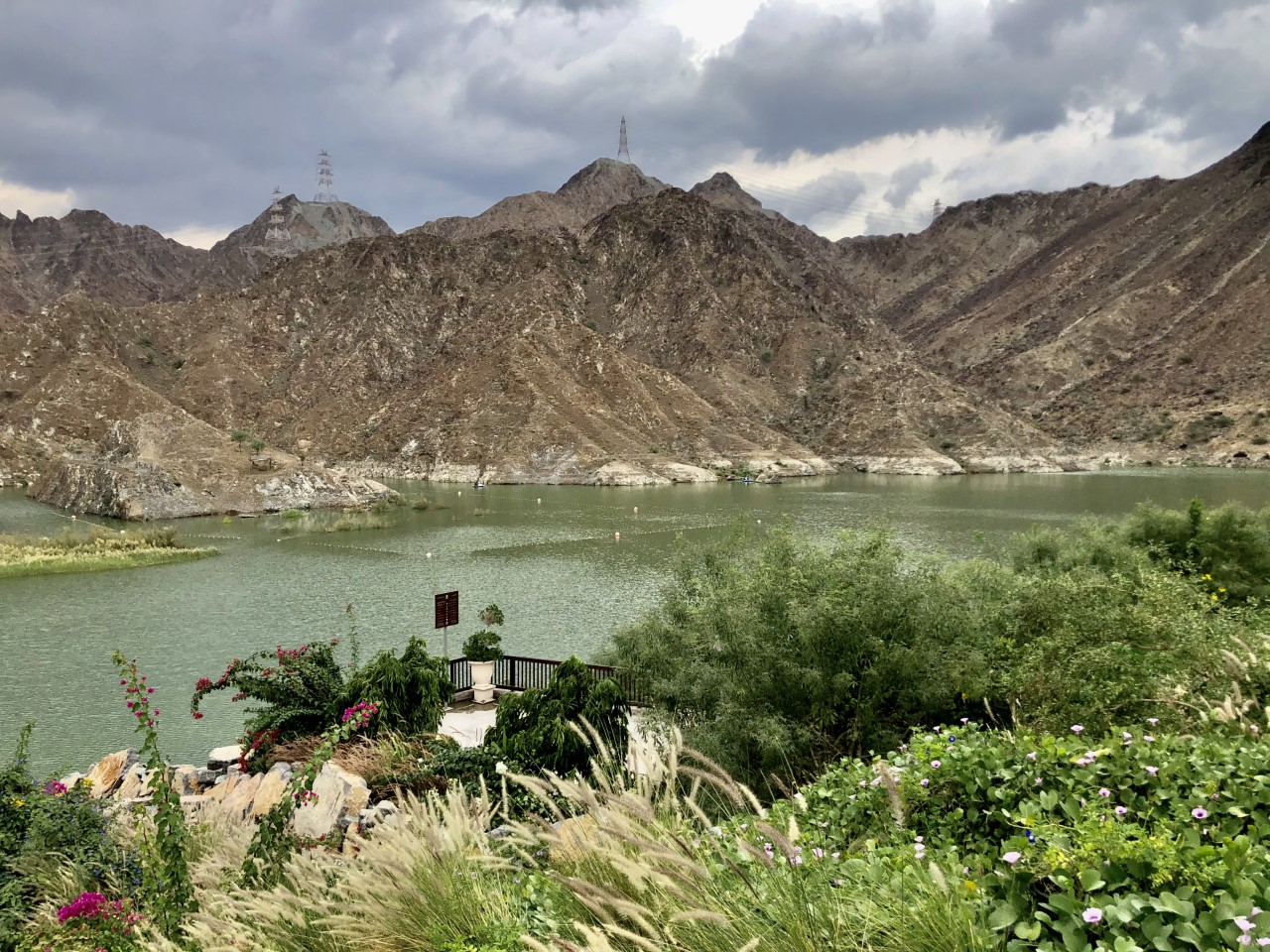
Al Rafisah dam in Khor Fakkan

Khor Fakkan Amphitheatre

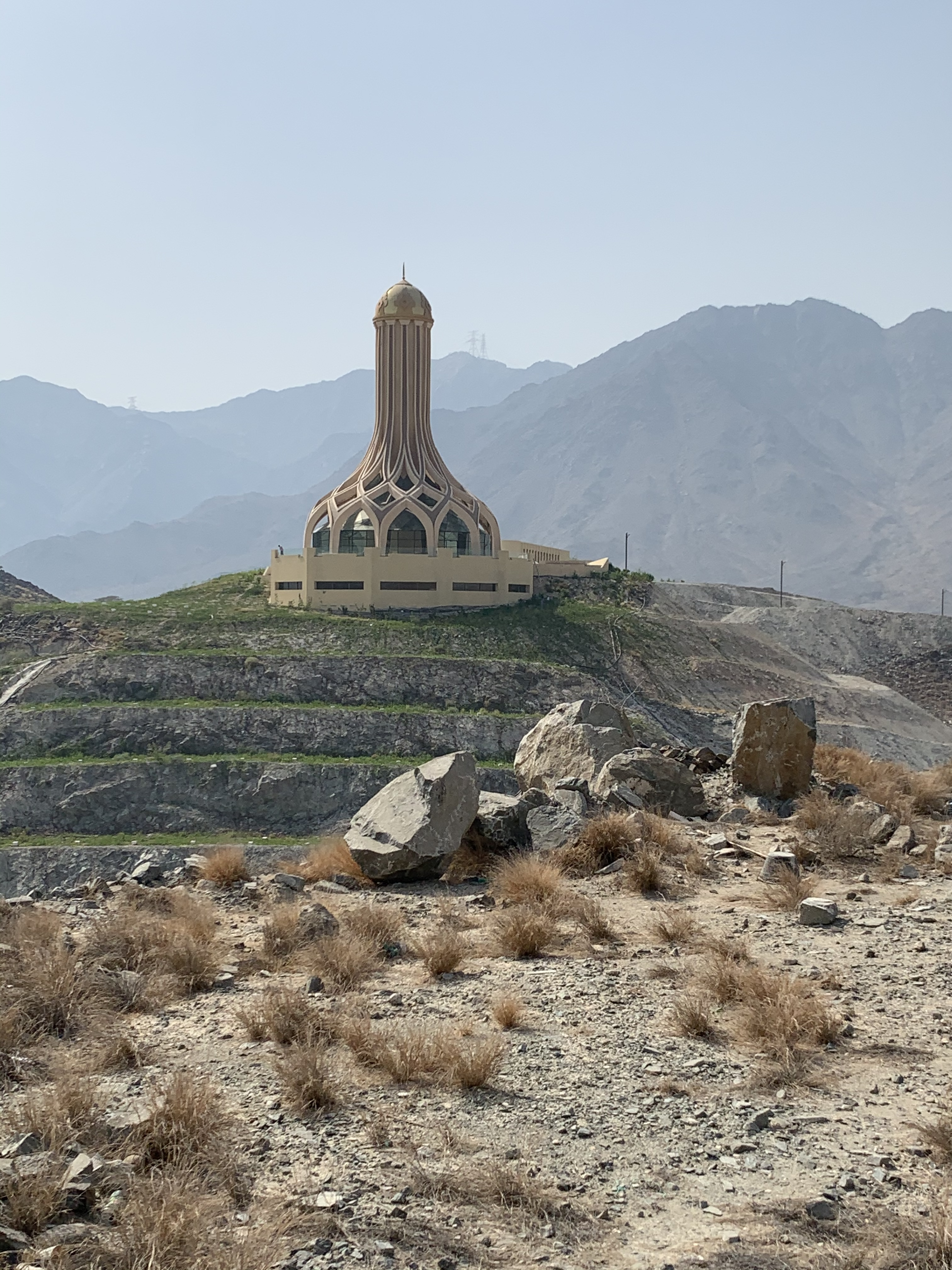
Resistance monument in Khor Fakkan

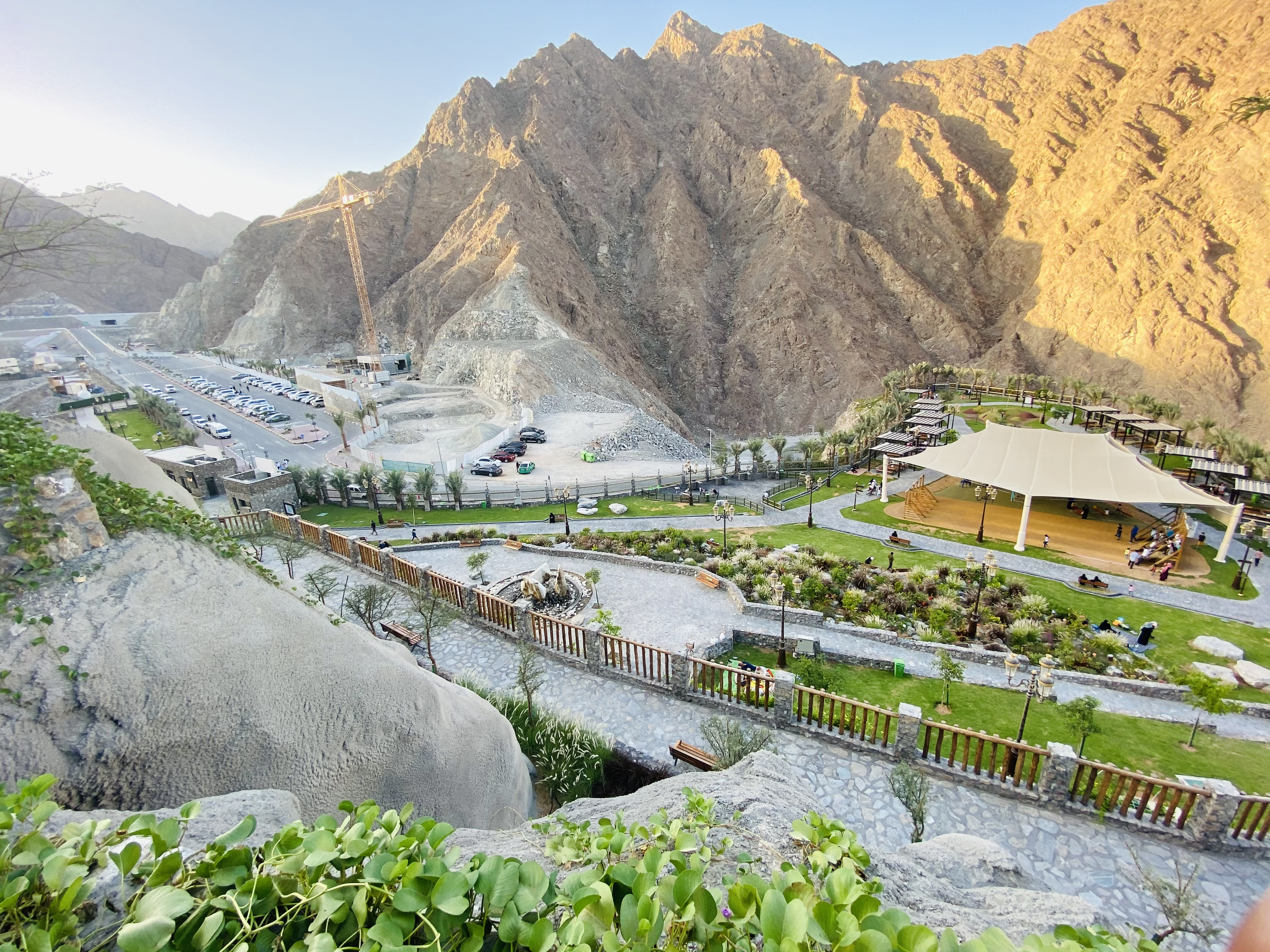
Shees Park

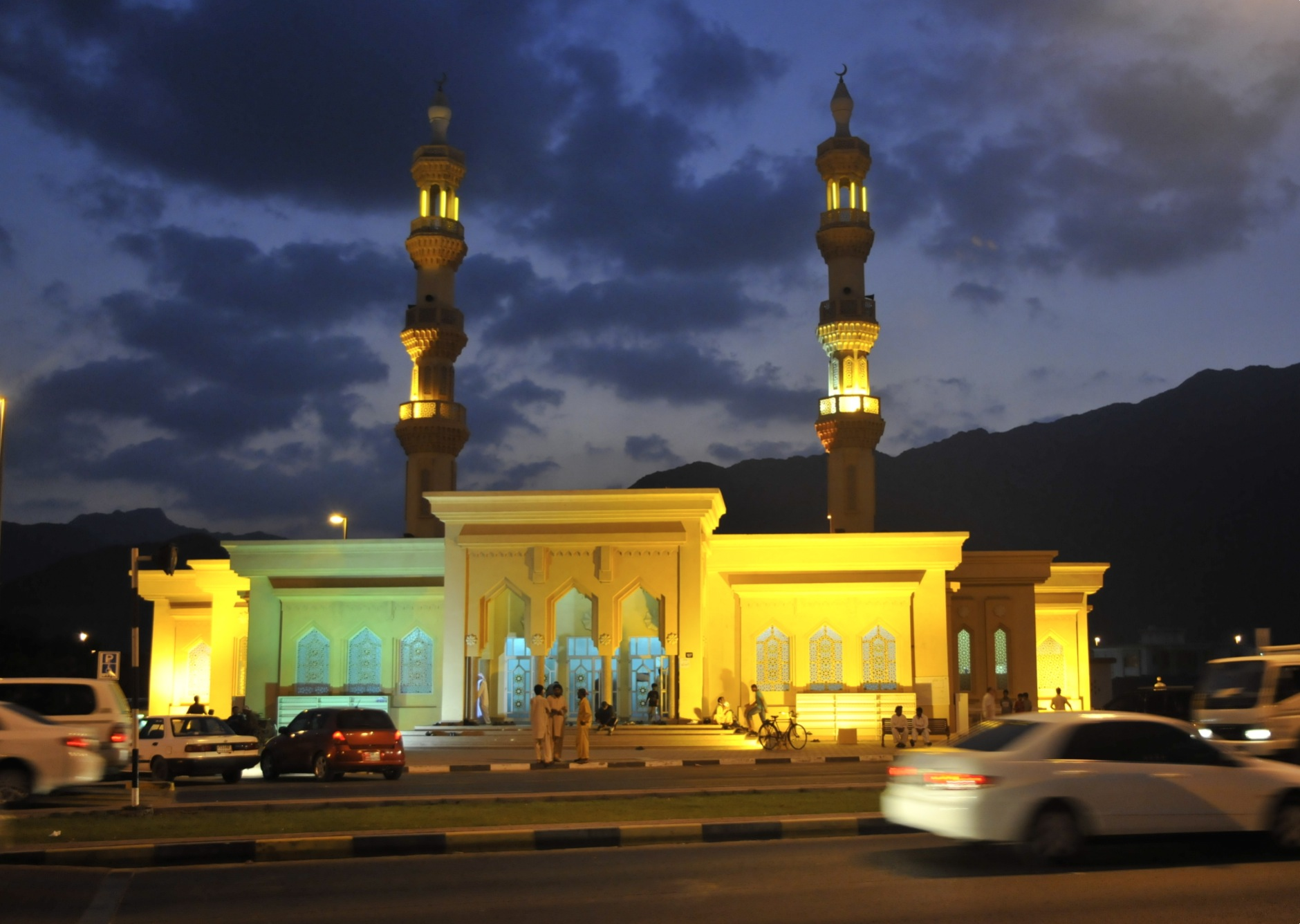
A mosque in Khor Fakkan

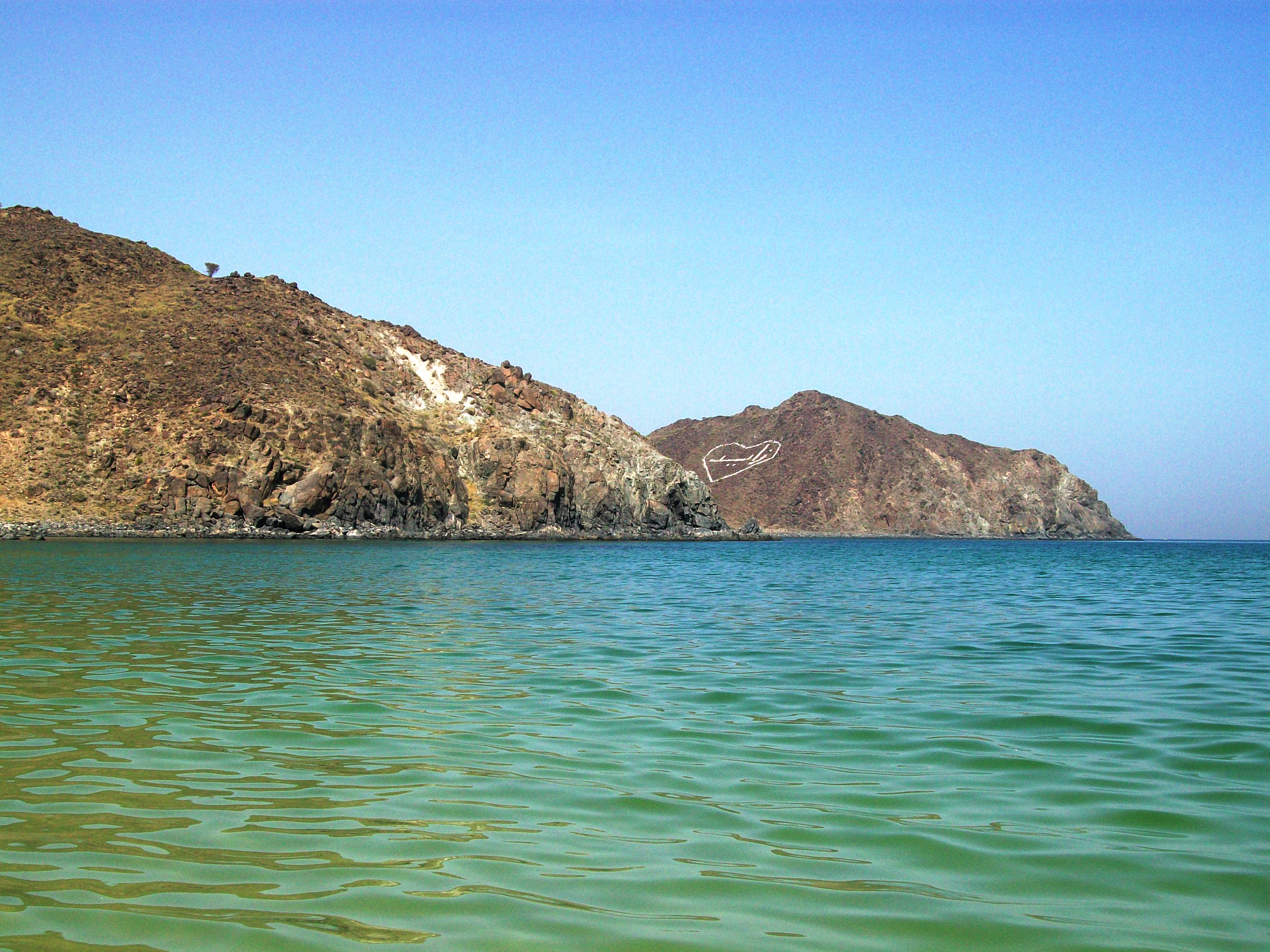
Khor Fakkan beach

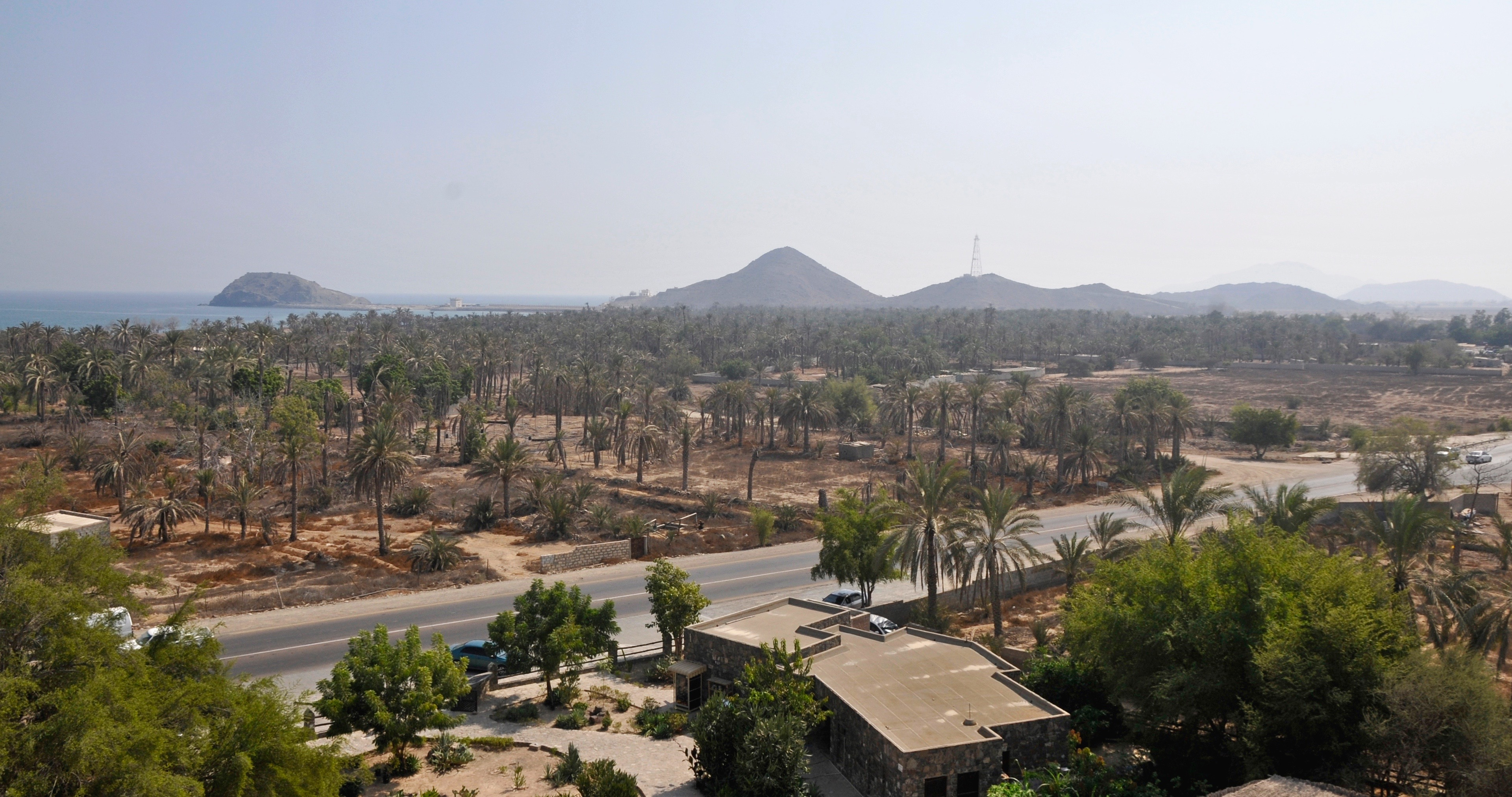
East view, with the Shumayliyyah or Western Hajar Mountains in the background

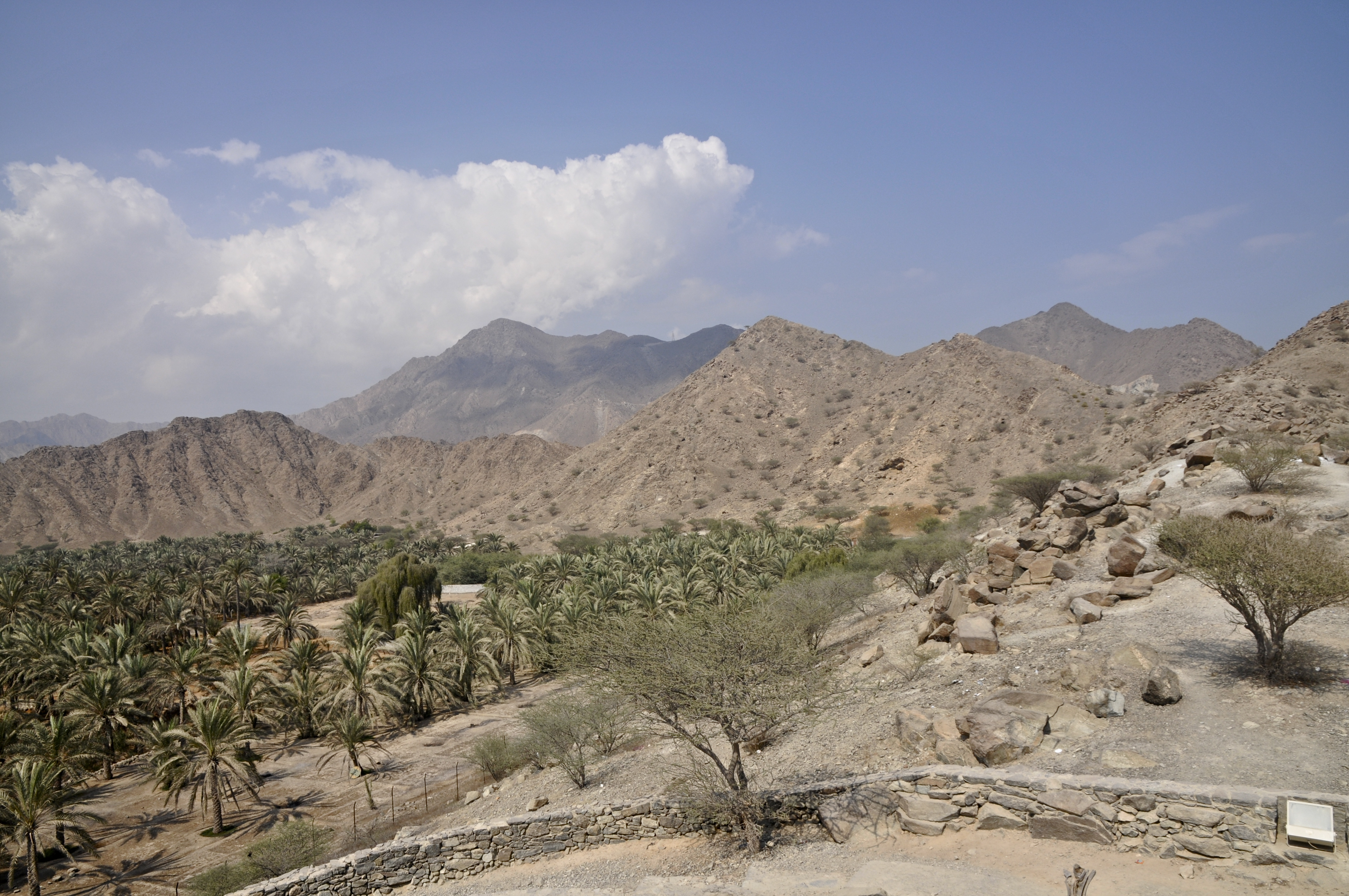
View to the western landscape

== Notable people ==
- H.E. Sheikh Saeed bin Saqer bin Sultan Al-Qasimi (born 1962), a Qasimi royal, Deputy Chairman of the Amiri Court in Khorfakkan
- Mohammed Ahmed Ibrahim (born 1962), visual artist
- Hussain Al Jassmi (born 1979), Arabic musician
- Abdullah Al-Naqbi, (born 1993), Emirati footballer
- Mohammed Khalfan (born 1992), Emirati footballer
- Fayez Banihammad (1977–2001), hijacker aboard United Airlines Flight 175 as part of the September 11 attacks.

== See also ==
- E 99 road (United Arab Emirates)
- Shees Park
- Khor Fakkan Amphitheatre
- Al Rafisah Dam
