= Wadi Half =

Wadi in Oman

Wadi Half Wādī Ḥalf
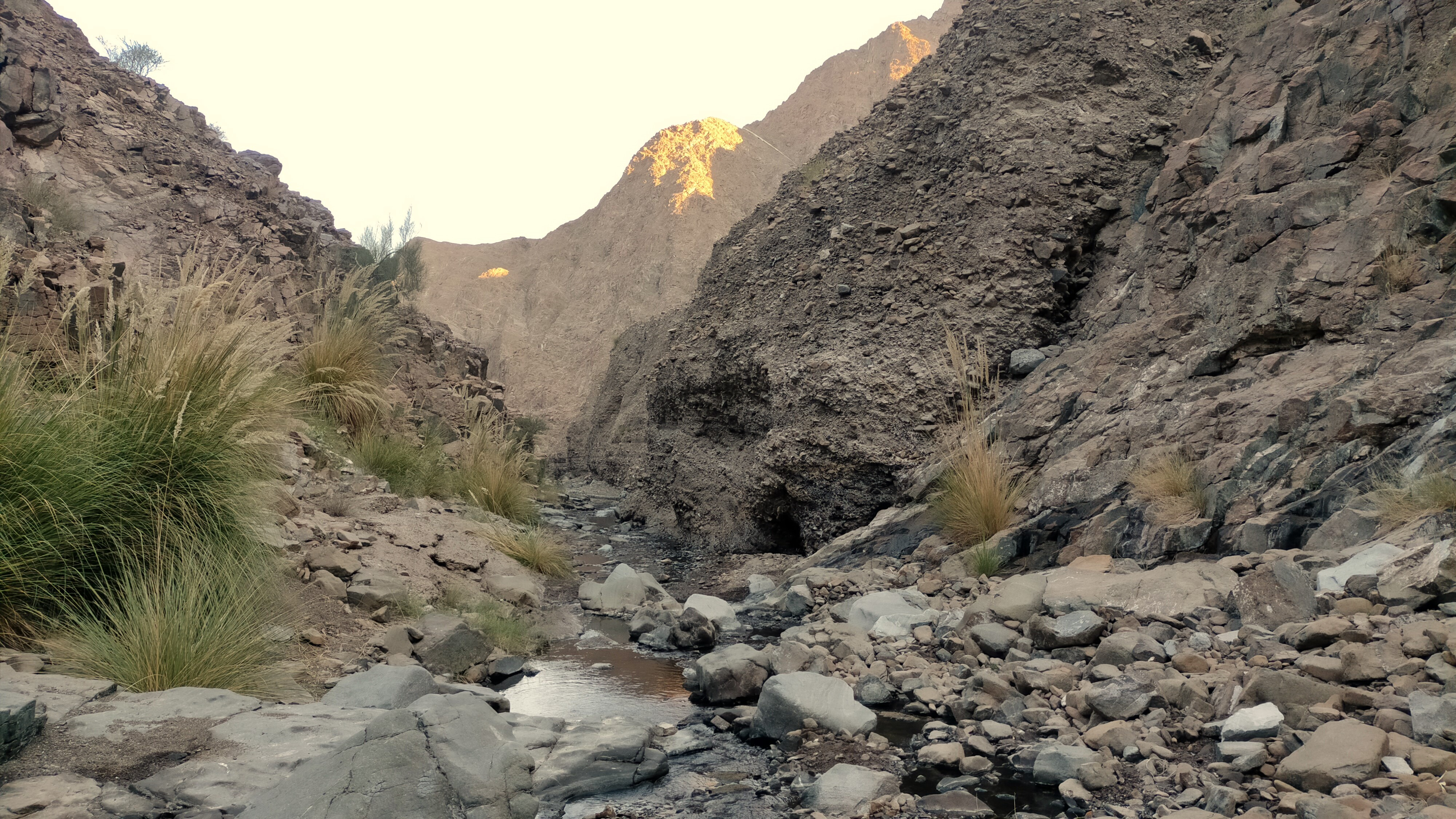
- Pools in Wadi Half

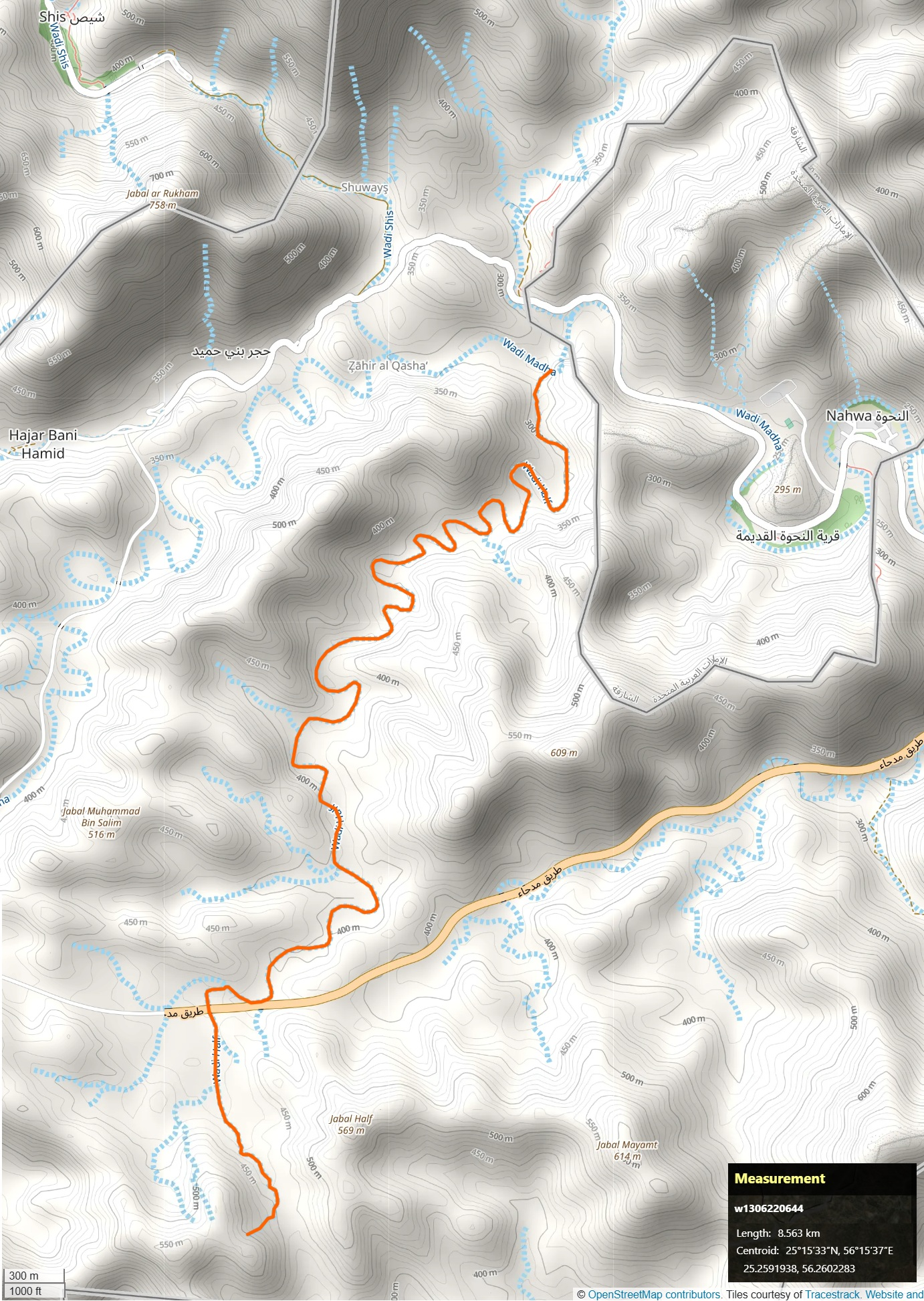
- Location and course of Wadi Half

- Location within Oman Location within Persian Gulf Location within West and Central Asia
- Native name: وادي حلف (Arabic)

Location
- Country: Oman
- Governorate: Musandam

Physical characteristics
- Source: Southwest of Jabal Half (569 m (1,867 ft))
  - elevation: 500 m (1,600 ft), approximately
- Mouth: Confluence with Wadi Madha
  - coordinates: 25°16′32″N 56°16′07″E
  - elevation: 289 m (948 ft)
- Length: 8.6 km (5.3 mi)
- Basin size: 106 km^{2} (41 mi^{2}) (Wadi Madha basin)

Basin features
- Progression: Wadi. Intermittent flow
- River system: Wadi Madha

Wadi Half (Arabic: وادي حلف, romanized: Wādī Ḥalf) is a valley or dry river with ephemeral or intermittent flow, flowing almost exclusively during the rainy season. It is located in northern Oman, in the Omani enclave of Madha (Musandam Governorate); and in the eastern United Arab Emirates, specifically the emirates of Sharjah, and Fujairah.

It is a right tributary of Wadi Madha, to whose hydrographic basin of 106 km^{2} (41 mi^{2}) it belongs.

== Course ==
The total length of Wadi Half is approximately 8.6 km (5.3 mi), running entirely within Omani territory.

Its source is located at an approximate altitude of 500 m (1,600 ft), southwest of Jabal Half (569 m (1,867 ft)), next to the drainage divide that separates the Wadi Madha and Wadi Safad basins.

At the end of its upper course, Wadi Half is crossed by the partially constructed new road, intended to link the city of Madha (Oman) with Daftah (UAE). Preliminary studies for this project had warned of the serious environmental impact it could cause, potentially resulting in irreparable damage to the area's natural environment.

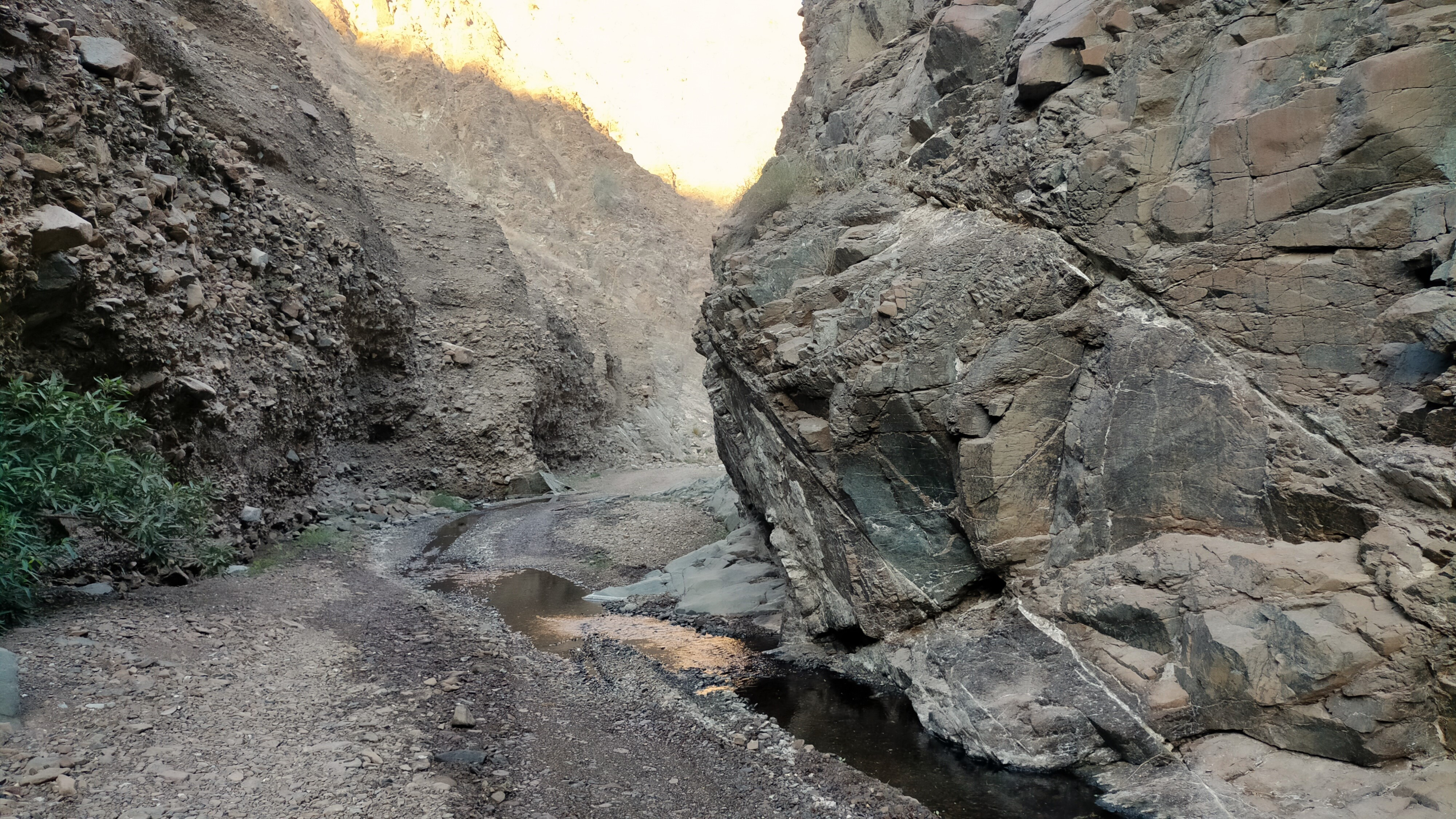
Channel of Wadi Half

In its gently sloping middle and lower reaches, Wadi Half forms the characteristic meanders also found in Wadi Madha and other wadis in the region. It also features several pools that retain water for much of the year.

It flows into Wadi Madha, shortly after the site of Z̧āhir al Qasha', and shortly before crossing the border of the Nahwa (UAE) enclave.

== Toponymy ==
Alternative names: Wādī Ḥalf, Wadi Half, Wadi Hilf, Wādī Ḩalf, Wādī Ḩilf.

The name of Wadi Half (with the spellings Wadi Half and Wādī Ḩalf), its tributaries, mountains and nearby towns, was recorded in the documentation and maps produced between 1950 and 1960 by the British Arabist, cartographer, military officer and diplomat Julian F. Walker, during the work carried out to establish the borders between the then-called Trucial States. These were subsequently completed by the Ministry of Defence of the United Kingdom, on 1:100,000 scale maps published in 1971.

In the National Atlas of the United Arab Emirates, it appears with the spelling Wādī Ḥalf (Arabic: وادي حلف).

== Population ==
The area of Wadi Madha and Wadi Half was populated mainly by the Madhahana, Bani Hamid, Bani Sa'ad, Dahwahir, and Naqbiyin tribes.

== See also ==
- List of wadis of the United Arab Emirates
- List of mountains in the United Arab Emirates
- List of wadis of Oman
- List of mountains in Oman
