= Madha (disambiguation) =

Madha may refer to:

- Madha, Oman, an exclave of Oman
- Wadi Madha, wadi in Oman and United Arab Emirates
- Madha, Maharashtra, a city and a municipal council in Maharashtra, India
  - Madha (Lok Sabha constituency)
  - Madha (Vidhan Sabha constituency)
- Madha, Hissar, a village in Haryana, India
- Madha Engineering College, in Kunrathur, India
- Omar Madha, British television director
