= Al Nahwa Cave =

Cave in Sharjah, United Arab Emirates

- كهف النحوه
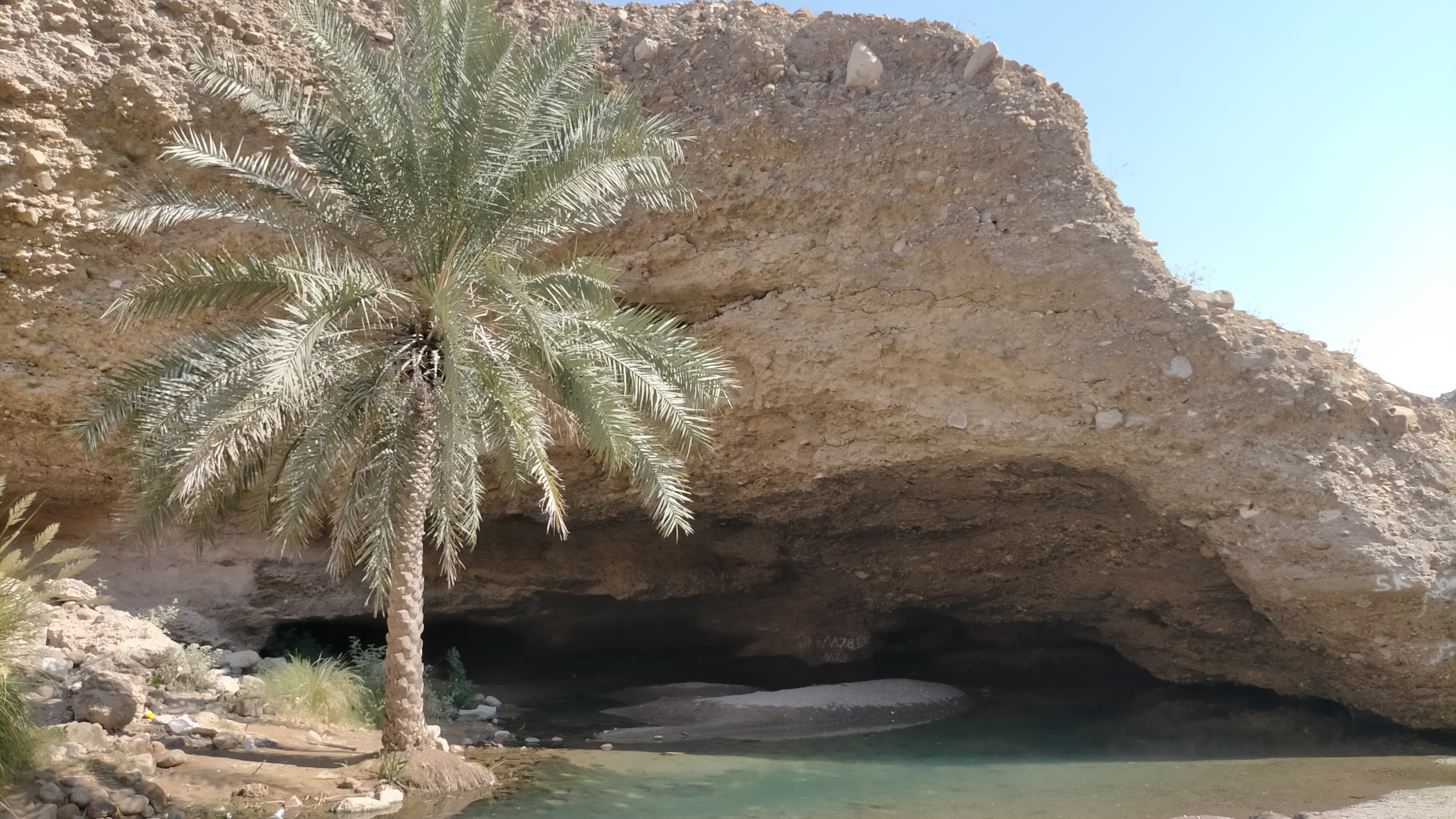
- front view of Nahwa Cave

- Location within United Arab Emirates Location within Persian Gulf Location within West and Central Asia
- Location: Nahwa, Emirate of Sharjah, the UAE
- Coordinates: 25.274876°N 56.272996°E
- Geology: Karst cavern, Mississippian Limestone
- Entrances: 1
- Access: Permanently open

Al Nahwa Cave (Arabic: كهف النحوه), also known as Kahf Aldaaba (كهف الدابة), is a cave and archaeological site located in Nahwa, northern Khor Fakkan, in the Emirate of Sharjah. Archaeological remains were discovered here in the 1930s.

The cave features a large chamber with domes, and most of the cavity is spacious enough to stand upright. Visitors can reach the cave by driving through a flat gravel plain, as it is connected to the road. At the entrance, a few palm trees grow, benefiting from the water and shade provided by the surrounding Wadi Madha.

== History ==
The location of Al Nahwa Cave is notable for its complex borders. Oman is situated to the east and the UAE to the west. Within this region lies Madha, an Omani enclave within the UAE, and inside Madha is Nahwa, a UAE enclave within Oman.

The origins of Al Nahwa’s unique second-order enclave status date back to the late 1930s, when local village elders invited representatives from neighboring territories. In 1968, Great Britain withdrew from the region, Muscat and Oman united in 1970, and the United Arab Emirates (UAE) was established in 1971. The borders have remained the same since then, with the region's primary resource shifting from freshwater to oil.

This unique geography makes Al Nahwa Cave an interesting point of reference within the region.

== See also ==
- List of wadis of the United Arab Emirates
