= Wadi Madha =

Wadi in Oman and UAE

Wadi Madha Wādī Maḥḍah
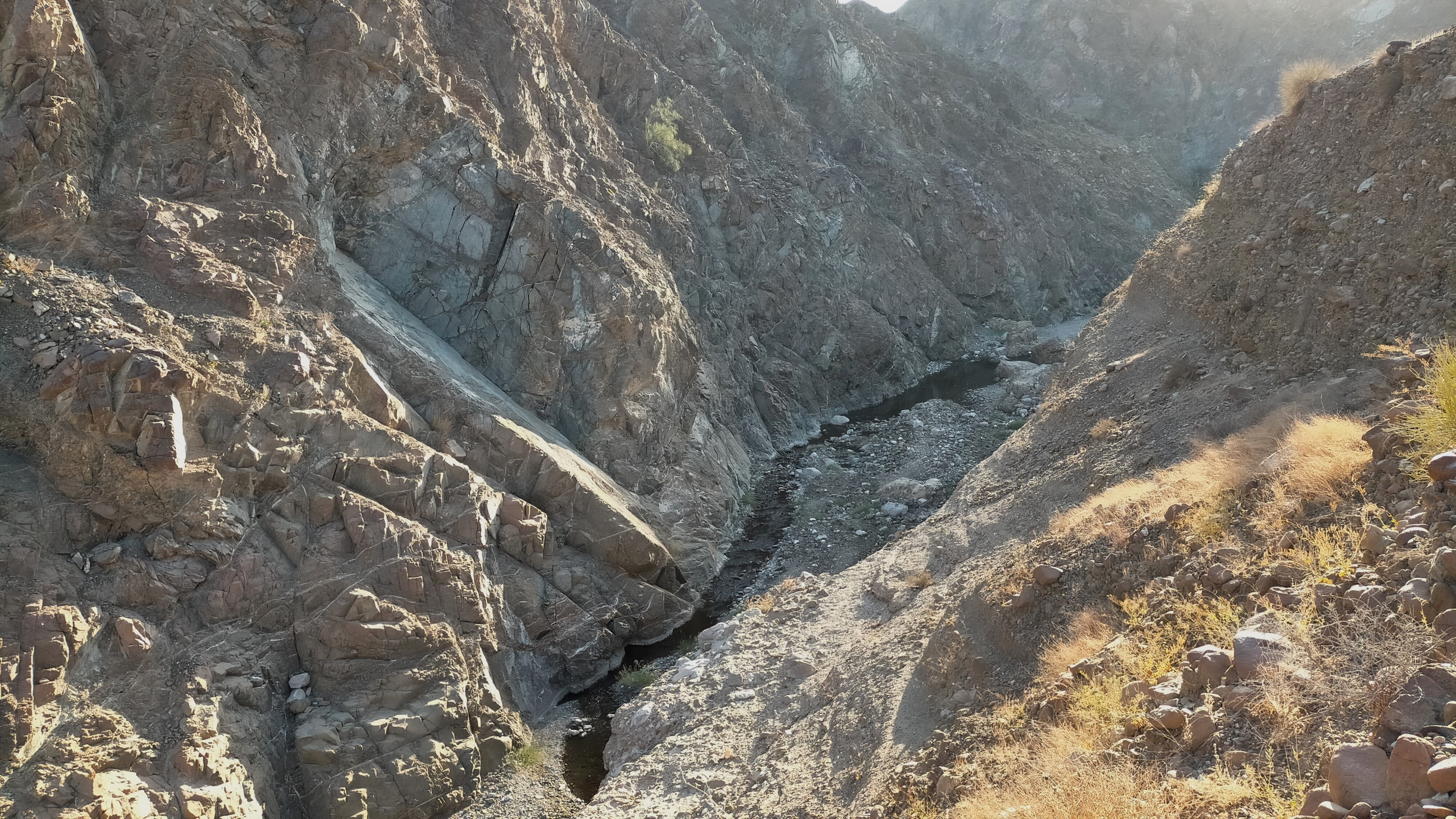

- Location within Oman Location within Persian Gulf Location within West and Central Asia
- Native name: وادي مدحاء (Arabic)

Location
- Country: Oman; United Arab Emirates
- Governorate Emirate: Musandam; Sharjah; Fujairah

Physical characteristics
- Source: SSE of Jabal Daftah (878 m (2,881 ft))
  - elevation: 698 m (2,290 ft) (approximately)
- Mouth: South of Murbah (Emirate of Fujairah, UAE), in the Gulf of Oman.
  - coordinates: 25°15′50.2103″N 56°22′7.1998″E
  - elevation: 0 m (0 ft)
- Length: 31 km (19 mi)
- Basin size: 106 km^{2} (41 mi^{2})

Basin features
- Progression: Wadi. Intermittent flow
- River system: Wadi Madha
- Tributaries
  - left: Wadi Shis, Wadi Sahanah. Sub-tributaries: Wadi Hajar Bani Hamid, Wadi Mardamt, Wādī ash Shi‘aybah, Wādī Badá, Wadi Al Hawrah
  - right: Wadi Mayamt, Wadi Half.

Wadi Madha (Arabic: وادي مدحاء, romanized: Wādī Maḥḍah) is a dry river valley or dry river with ephemeral or intermittent flow, which flows almost exclusively during the rainy season. It is located in northern Oman, within the Omani enclave of Madha (Musandam), and east of the United Arab Emirates, in the emirates of Sharjah and Fujairah.

It forms its own drainage basin, covering an area of approximately 106 km^{2} (41 mi^{2}), and is bordered to the north by the drainage basins of Wadi Wurayah and Wadi Shie; to the west by that of Wadi Ham; and to the south by the Wadi Safad.

The main wadi, Wadi Madha, lends its name to the entire drainage basin. This basin includes numerous tributaries and sub-tributaries, forming a significant drainage network of approximately 111 independent streams, most of which are unnamed.

The main tributaries and sub-tributaries are:

- In the northern sub-basin: Wadi Sahanah. Sub-tributaries: Wadi Mardamt, Wadi ash Shi‘aybah, Wadi Badá, Wadi Al Hawrah.
- In the southern sub-basin: Wadi Shis / Wādī Ash Shīş, Wadi Mayamt, Wadi Half. Sub-tributaries: Wadi Hajar Bani Hamid.

== Course ==
The total length of the Wadi Madha is approximately 31 km (19 mi), of which 10 km (6.2 mi) run in Emirati territory, and 21 km (13 mi) in Omani territory. Its source is located within territory of the emirate of Sharjah (UAE), at an approximate altitude of 698 m (2,290 ft), south-southeast of Jabal Daftah (878 m (2,881 ft)).

During its course, Wadi Madha crosses the border between Oman and the UAE four times, passing through the enclaves of Madha and Nahwa before emptying into the Gulf of Oman, south of Murbah/Sha'biyyāt Mirbah (Emirate of Fujairah, UAE).

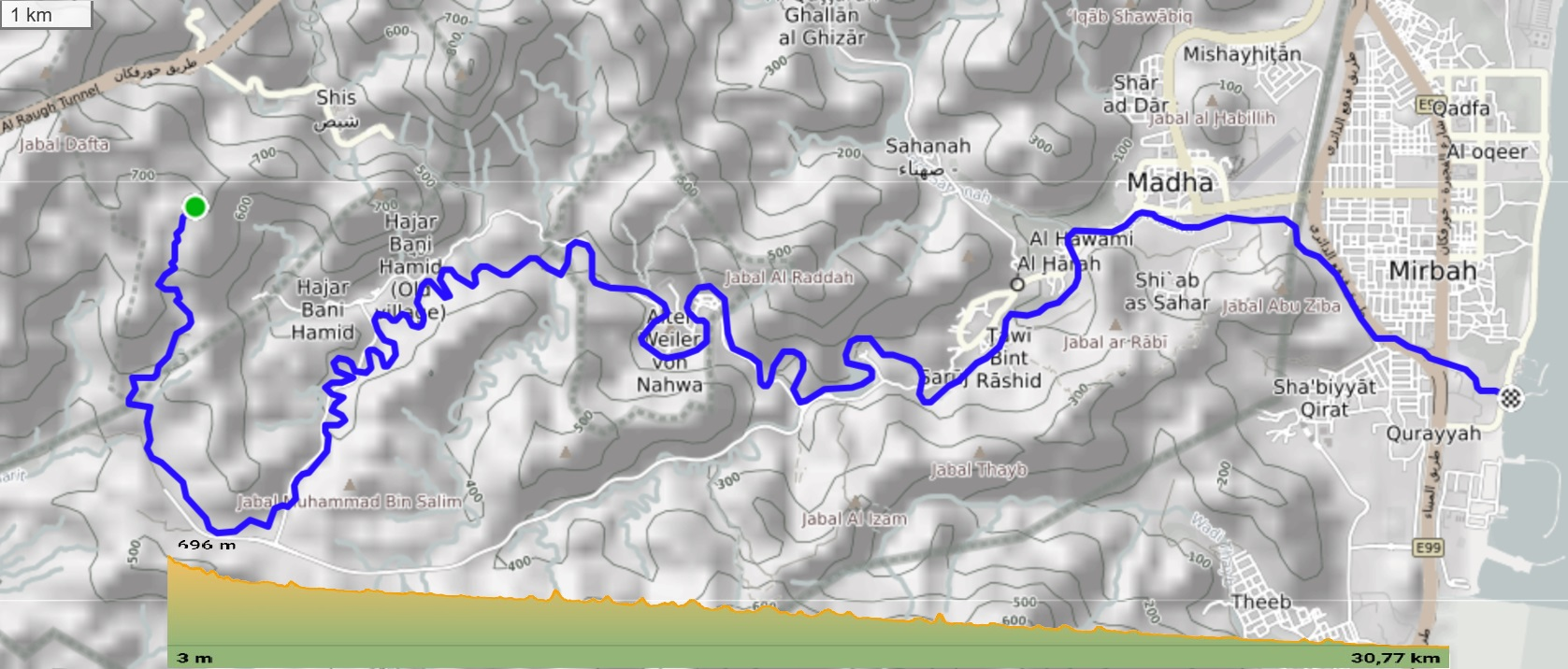
Course chart and elevation profile of Wadi Madha - Oman and UAE

The upper course of the Wadi Madha extends for the first two kilometers entirely within the United Arab Emirates. It flows from north to south with a moderate slope. The point where it first crosses the border between the UAE and Oman also marks the boundary between the Emirates of Sharjah and Fujairah.

Within the Madha enclave, the wadi shifts its course to a south-southeast direction for another two kilometers. A portion of its bed runs parallel to the partially constructed new road intended to connect the city of Madha (Oman) with Daftah (UAE). Preliminary studies had cautioned that this construction could have a significant negative environmental impact, causing irreparable damage to the natural environment of the region, particularly to the channels of Wadi Madha and its tributaries, Wadi Half and Wadi Mayamt.

Shortly after, Wadi Madha flows north-northeast, between the channel of the small Wadi Hajar Bani Hamid and that of Wadi Half, gaining a significant flow from its numerous tributary torrents, as evidenced by its characteristic meanders. A branch of the Madha-Daftah road, which leads to the village of Hajar Bani Hamid, also severely affected the Wadi Madha riverbed, with thousands of cubic meters of debris scattered along its banks and tributary wadis.

In the village or settlement of Z̧āhir al Qasha, Wadi Madha receives the confluence of Wadi Shis on its left, and continues its course towards the east, forming a small gorge, shortly before the mouth of another of its important tributaries, the Wadi Half, and the crossing with the border line of the Nahwa (UAE) enclave.

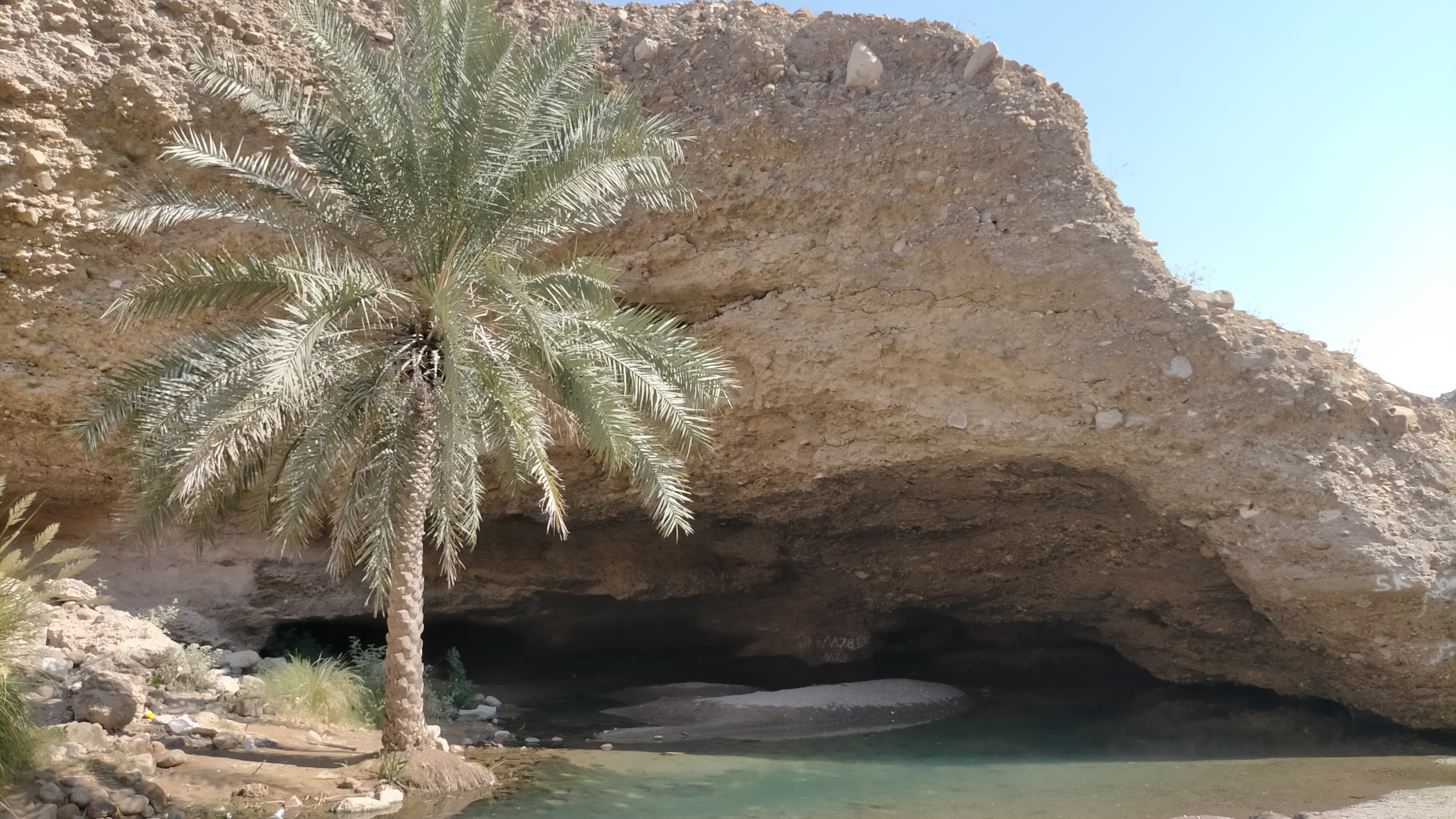
Wadi Madha in Nahwa (UAE) - Al Nahwa Cave

For 4 km (2.5 mi), the Wadi Madha runs through the Nahwa enclave, also forming several meanders . On its banks it is common to find lush palm groves and fields of crops, especially around the old town of Nahwa. Also popular and very well known for tourism is the so-called Al Nahwa Cave, located in the course of the wadi itself.

The next UAE-Oman border is located at the exit of the modern part of the village of Nahwa, which, like the others, has no barriers or checkpoints, and does not require a visa or special requirements for crossing. The only indicators of the border are the flags and large murals with the portraits of the rulers of each country.

Back in Oman, the Wadi Madha crosses an area with natural pools and two small villages with agricultural crops: Al Maksar and Sa'ad, the latter located just before the confluence of the Wadi Mayamt, one of the most affected by the construction of the Madha-Daftah road. The tail end of the extensive reservoir of the As Saruj dam reaches this point.

Downstream from the dam and up to its mouth, the Wadi Madha passes through the most populated area of its entire course.

In Oman: the village of Saruj, the historic village of Al Ghūnah, Al Ḩārah, Al Hawami, Al Anz̧ār (where the Wadi Sahanah / Wadi Sahna meets) and finally the city of Madha / Sha'biyyāt Madḥah.

Upon reaching the coastal strip, on the other side of the border, already in the Emirate of Fujairah (UAE), the course of Wadi Madha has been partially channeled and diverted from its natural path, crossing the southern end of the city of Murbah / Sha'biyyāt Mirbah (Emirate of Fujairah), shortly before its mouth in the Gulf of Oman.

== Dams and reservoirs ==
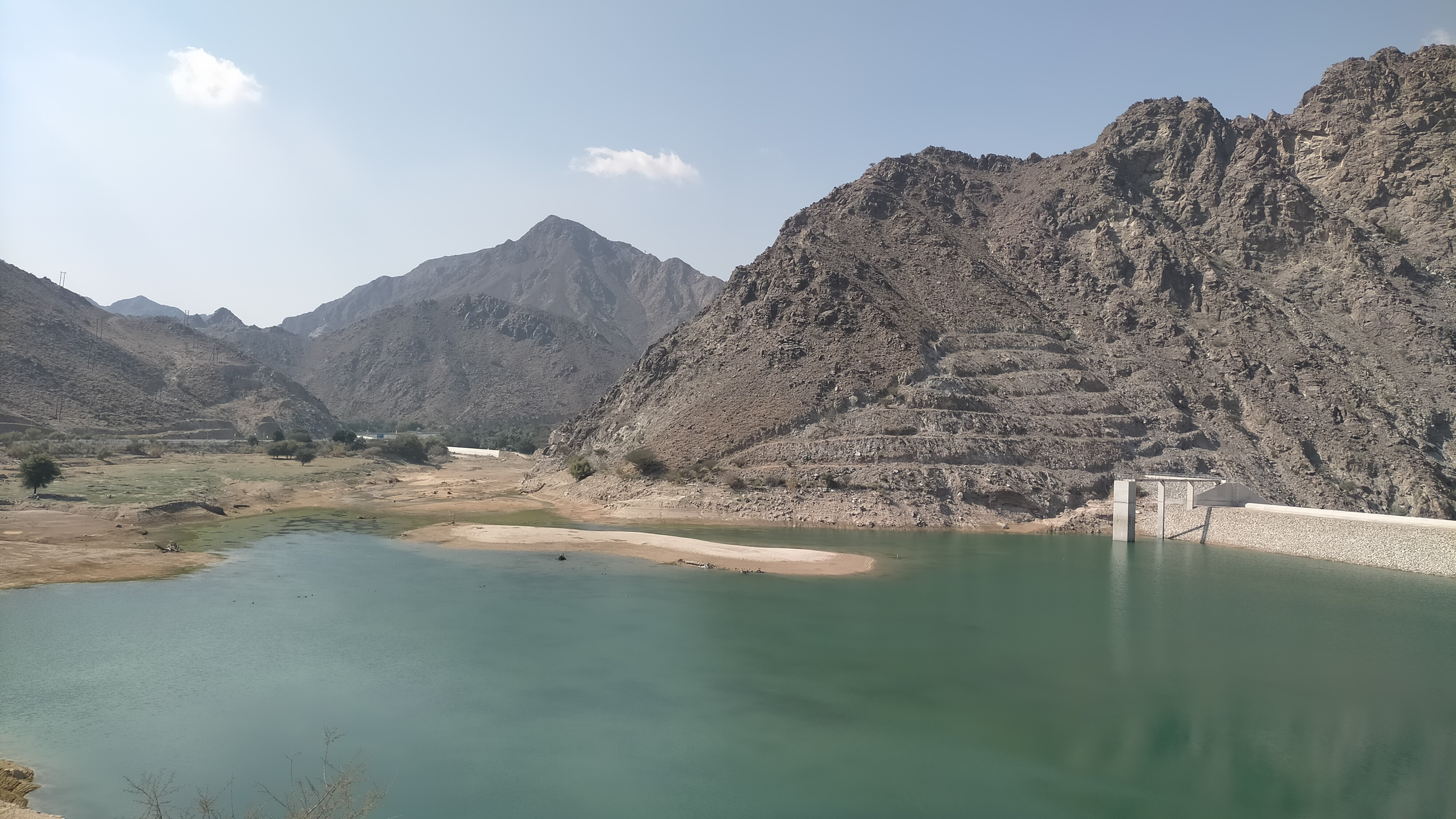
Wadi Madha. As Saruj Dam, Oman

To supply water to the inhabitants of the area, prevent the danger of flash floods, and increase the potential for groundwater recharge, a dam was built in 2004 on the Wadi Madha river, just before the village of As Saruj (Oman), and was therefore named As Saruj Dam. The dam has a height of 25.5 m (84 ft) and a reservoir with a capacity of 1.35 million cubic meters (coordinates: 25°16′4″N, 56°17′58″E).

Also in Oman, another dam was built in 2009 in the northern sub-basin of the Wadi Madha, on the channel of its tributary the Wadi Sahanah / Wadi Sahna, with a height of 13.2 m (43 ft) and a reservoir with a capacity of 0.5 million cubic meters (coordinates: 25°17′15″N, 56°18′20″E). This second dam was officially named Wadi Sahna Dam.

== Toponymy ==
Alternative names: Wādī Maḥḍah, Wādī Maḩḑah, Wadi Madha, Wadi Madha', Wadi Madhah, Wādī Madḥā’, Wādī Madḩah, Wādī Madḩā, Wādī Madḩā’

The name of Wadi Madha (with the spelling Wādī Madḩah), its tributaries, mountains and nearby towns, was recorded in the documentation and maps produced between 1950 and 1960 by the Arabist, cartographer, military officer and British diplomat Julian F. Walker, during the work carried out to establish the borders between the then called Trucial States, later completed by the Ministry of Defence of the United Kingdom, in 1:100,000 scale maps published in 1971.

In the National Atlas of the United Arab Emirates it is spelled Wādī Maḥḍah.

== Population ==
The Wadi Madha area was mainly populated by the Madhahana, Bani Hamid, Bani Sa'ad, Dahwahir and Naqbiyin tribes.

== See also ==
- List of wadis of the United Arab Emirates
- List of mountains in the United Arab Emirates
- List of wadis of Oman
- List of mountains in Oman
