= Wadi Shis =

Wadi in UAE

Wadi Shis Wādī Ash Shīṣ
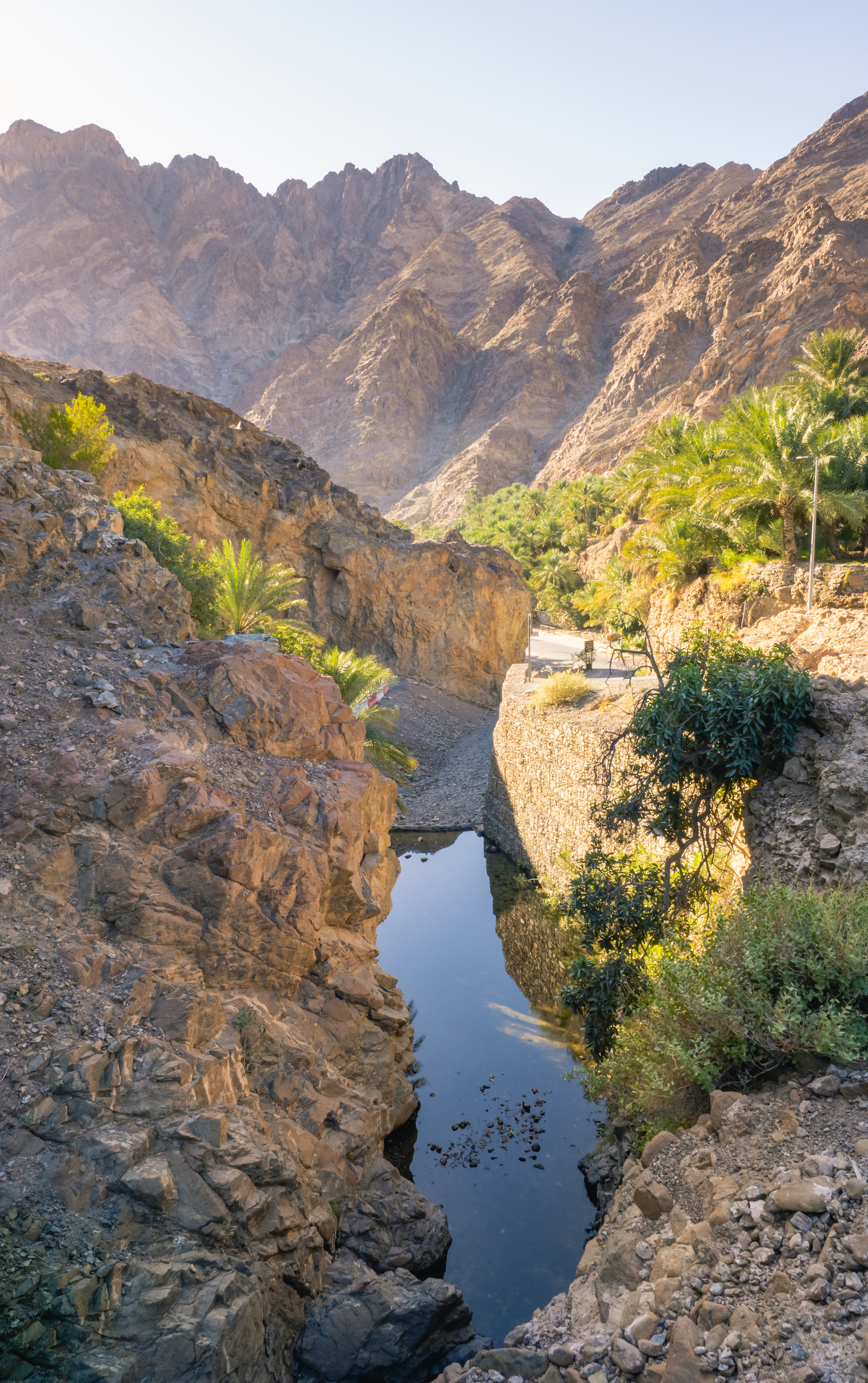

- Location within United Arab Emirates Location within Persian Gulf Location within West and Central Asia
- Native name: وادي صفد (Arabic)

Location
- Country: United Arab Emirates; Oman
- Emirate Governorate: Sharjah; Musandam, Oman

Physical characteristics
- Source
  - elevation: 800 m (2,600 ft)
- Mouth
  - coordinates: 25°16′35″N 56°15′40″E
  - elevation: 302 m (991 ft)
- Length: 8.5 km (5.3 mi)
- Basin size: 106 km^{2} (41 mi^{2})

Basin features
- River system: Wadi Madha
- Tributaries
  - right: Wadi Hajar Bani Hamid

Wadi Shis or Wadi Shees (Arabic: وادي شيص, romanized: Wādī Ash Shīṣ), is a wadi, a seasonal watercourse, in the Hajar Mountains of Sharjah, United Arab Emirates.

The wadi passes through the mountain village of Shis and crosses the border with the enclave of Madha (Oman) one kilometer downstream. It subsequently flows into Wadi Madha.

Like many of the wadis of the Hajar Mountains, Shis can be dangerous during and following periods of rain and in 2020 four UAE nationals lost their cars to flash-floods in the wadi.

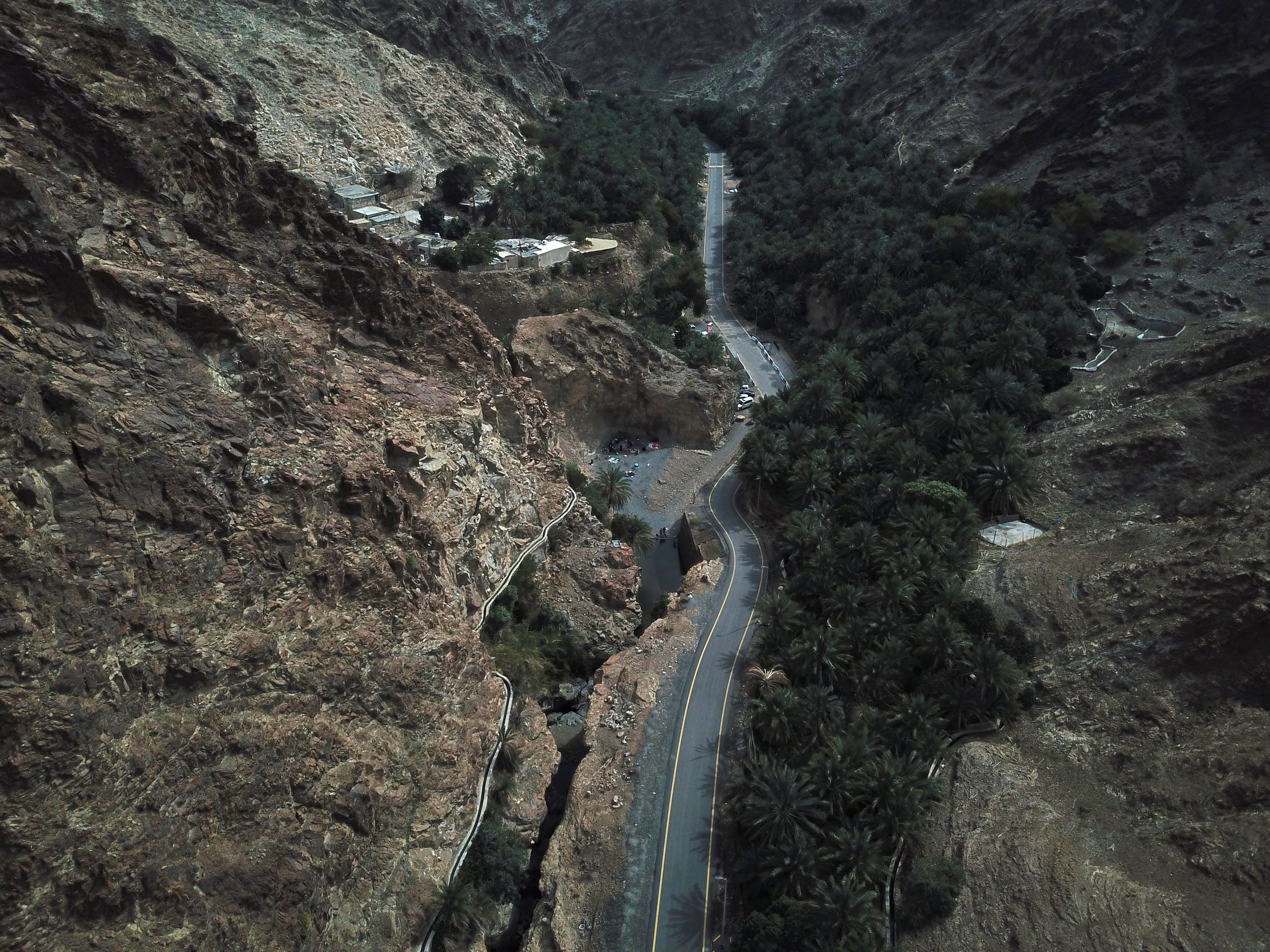
View down the Wadi Shis towards the village of Shis from the Sharjah-Khor Fakkan highway.

The village is the site of an integrated recreation facility, constructed to highlight the natural beauty of the area. It was opened in October 2020. Between the area's natural microclimate and the investment from the Government of Sharjah, Wadi Shis is establishing itself as a great day trip for tourists.

== Population ==
The Wadi Shis area was populated mainly by the Naqbiyin tribe, corresponding to the Bani Hamid tribal area.

== See also ==
- List of wadis of the United Arab Emirates
