= Shis =

Shis شيص
- Location within United Arab Emirates
- Coordinates: 25°17′26″N 56°14′44″E
- Country: United Arab Emirates
- Emirate: Sharjah

Area
  - Total: 19.59 km^{2} (7.56 sq mi)
- Elevation: 364 m (1,194 ft)

Population (2017-07-01)
  - Total: 110
  - Density: 5.6/km^{2} (15/sq mi)

Shis (Arabic: شيص) is the name of a settlement to the East of Sharjah, United Arab Emirates (UAE). It is the westernmost district of Khor Fakkan Municipality.

The village of Shis was previously accessible only by a track leading from the East Coast up the Wadi Shis, a seasonal watercourse that passes through the Omani exclave of Madha and the Emirati exclave of Nahwa, itself enclosed by the Omani exclave. The village is now reached by the Khor Fakkan road.

It is the location of the Shees Park, a recreational facility opened in October 2020.
