= Madha, Hissar =

Madha
- Village
- Location in Haryana, India Madha (India)
- Coordinates: 29.196639°N 76.065315°E
- Country: India
- State: Haryana
- District: Hisar
- Named for: Madh

Population (2007)
  - Total: 25,000

Languages
  - Official: Hindi
- Time zone: UTC+5:30 (IST)
- PIN: 125039
- ISO 3166 code: IN-HR
- Vehicle registration: HR 86
- Website: www.hisar.nic.in

Madha is a village of Jats located in Hissar district in Haryana, India.

Madha is a village in Narnaund Tehsil of Hissar District in Haryana State of India. It is situated 46 km from Hissar city on the road to Narnaund which also leads to Jind. At Madha there is another road that leads to Hansi Tehsil. It is 16 km from hansi Tehsil and only 6 km from Narnaund town (where India's largest grain market is located).

The village has a population of 25,000, of which 12,000 are female.

West of Madha is fertilized land and the rest of the area around the village is fertile plain land, served by an irrigation canal. Madha has two large ponds (johd) and small pond (jhodi).

Madha has both a girls' and a boys' secondary government school. The village has a total of three schools with two government run, and one otherwise run.

Madha has an old Shiva and Bajrang Bali temple and Akhara for sadhus (Hindu saints) as well as a village temple nearby, the Temple of Baba Lal Das where newlyweds go for blessings before entering the village. On every shukla 15 many people from all over India come for blessings.

Near the village there is a large gausala of BABA LAL DAS (the biggest in north India). This was established in 1967 by a farmer. The gausala has nearby 1,100 acres (4.5 km^{2}) of land; it has also a big power plant of cost 4.5 crores. The yearly budget of the gausala is in crores.

Madha is an administrative unit and has panchayat samiti. It also has a Patwari (government land record officer) and ADO (Assistant Development Officer, for development of agricultural activities).

== Agriculture ==
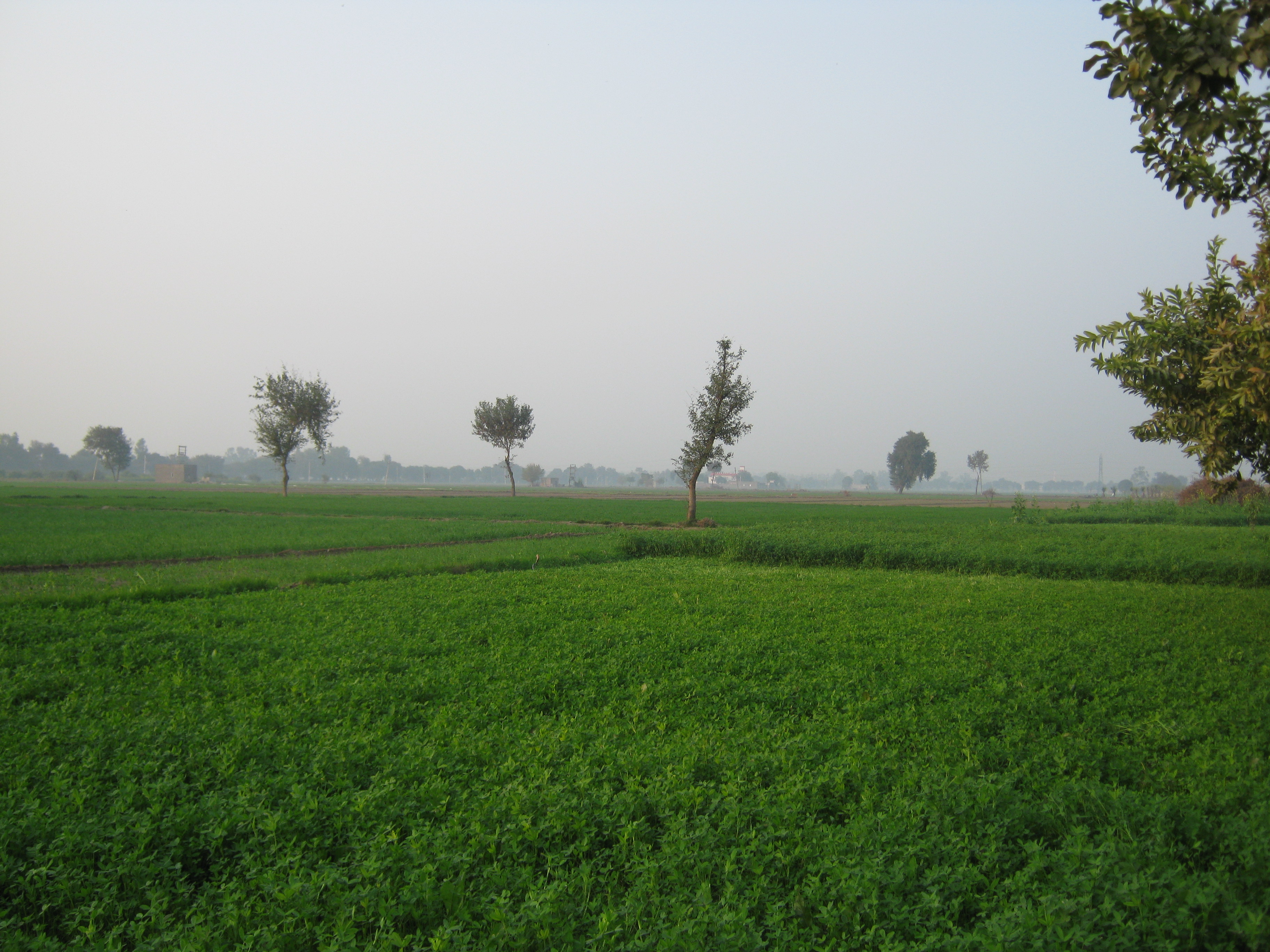
Green fields in Madha

Despite recent industrial development, Haryana is primarily an agricultural state. About 70% of residents are engaged in agriculture. Wheat and rice are the major crops. Haryana is self-sufficient in food production and the second largest contributor to India's central pool of food grains. The main crops of Haryana are wheat, rice, sugarcane, cotton, oilseeds, pulses, barley, maize, and millet. There are two main types of crops in Haryana: Rabi and Kharif. The major Kharif crops of Haryana are rice, jowar, bajra, maize, cotton, jute, sugarcane, sesame and groundnut. For these crops the ground is prepared in April and May and the seeds are sown at the commencement of rains in June. The crops are ready for harvesting by the beginning of November. The major Rabi crops are wheat, tobacco, pulses, linseed, rapeseed and mustard. The ground is prepared by the end of October or the beginning of November and the crops are harvested by March.

About 86% of the area is arable, and of that 96% is cultivated. About 75% of the area is irrigated, through tube wells and an extensive system of canals. Madha contributed significantly to the Green Revolution in India in the 1970s that made the country self-sufficient in food production.

Dairy farming is also an essential part of the rural economy. Madha has a livestock population of 14000. Milk and milk products form an essential part of the local diet. There is the saying Desaan main des Haryana, jit doodh dahi ka khaana, which means "Best among all the countries in the world is Haryana, where the staple food is milk and yoghurt". Haryana, with 660 grams of availability of milk per capita per day, ranks at number two in the country as against the national average of 232 grams. There is a vast network of milk societies that support the dairy industry. The National Dairy Research Institute at Karnal, and the Central Institute for Research on Buffaloes at Hisar are instrumental in development of new breeds of cattle and propagation of these breeds through embryo transfer technology. The Murrah breed of water buffalo from Haryana is world-famous for its milk production.

== Climate ==
Data

Climate chart (precipitation, max. and min. temperature)
J	F	M	A	M	J	J	A	S	O	N	D
13 21 6	16 25 8	12 31 14	5.6 37 19	20 41 24	43 41 28	141 37 27	147 35 26	65 35 24	15 34 18	6.1 29 11	7.3 24 7
- █ Average max. and min. temperatures in °C
- █ Precipitation totals in mm
- Source: IMD
Imperial conversion
J	F	M	A	M	J	J	A	S	O	N	D
0.5 71 42	0.6 76 47	0.5 87 57	0.2 98 67	0.8 105 76	1.7 106 82	5.5 99 81	5.8 95 79	2.6 96 75	0.6 94 64	0.2 84 52	0.3 74 44
- █ Average max. and min. temperatures in °F
- █ Precipitation totals in inches
