= Wadi Safad =

Wadi in UAE

Wadi Safad Wādī Şafad
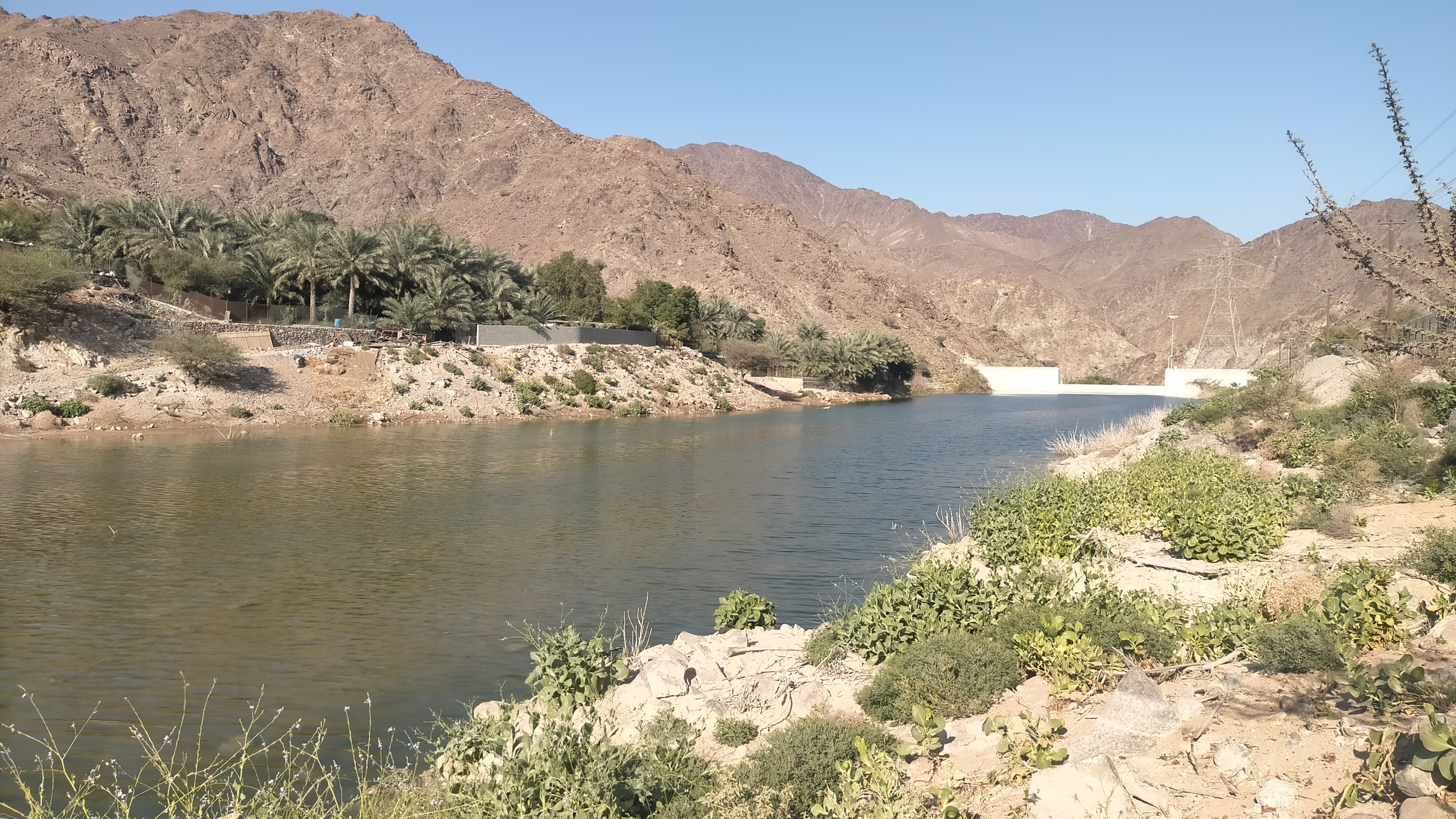
- Wadi Safad Main Dam Reservoir

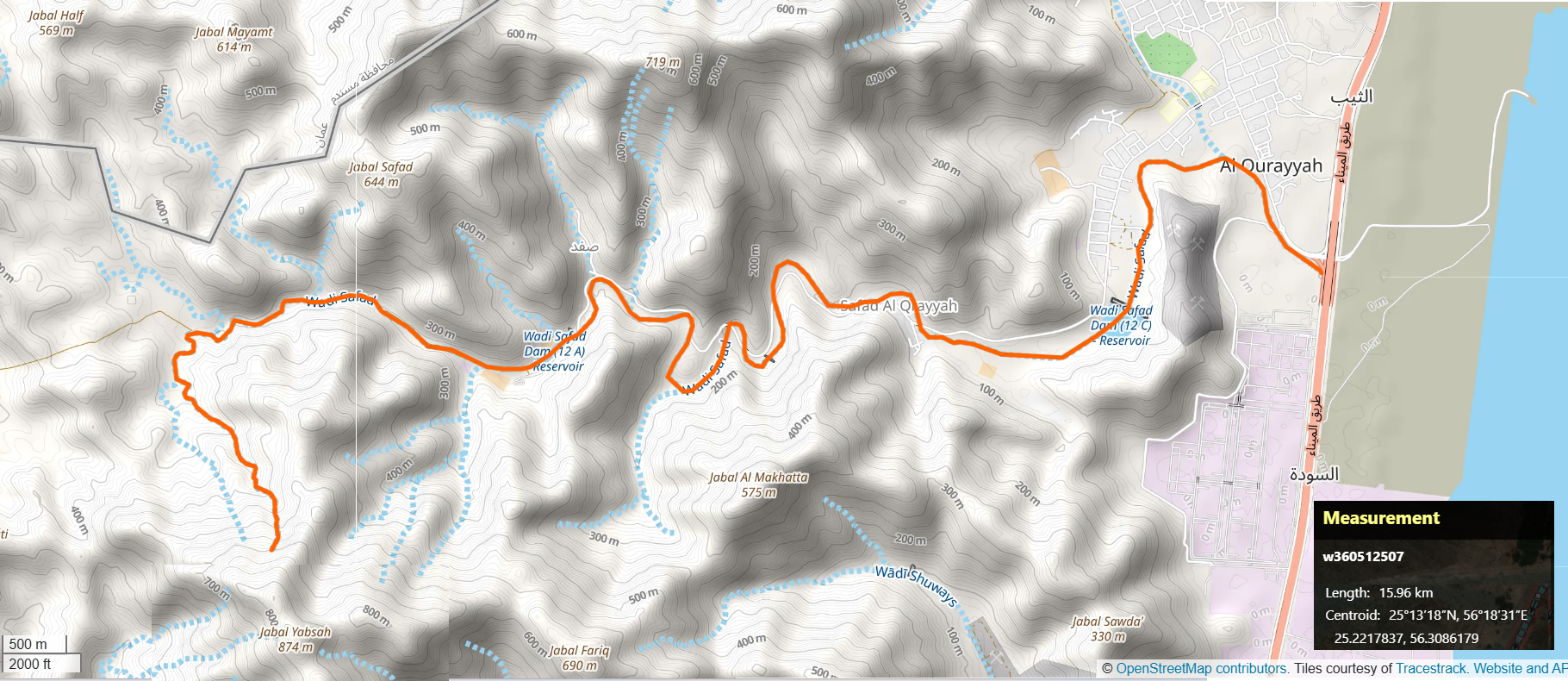
- Location and course of Wadi Safad

- Location within United Arab Emirates Location within Persian Gulf Location within West and Central Asia
- Native name: وادي صفد (Arabic)

Location
- Country: United Arab Emirates
- Emirate: Fujairah

Physical characteristics
- Source
  - elevation: 705 m (2,313 ft)
- Mouth
  - coordinates: 25°13′45.0″N 56°21′05.0″E
  - elevation: 0 m (0 ft)
- Length: 15.5 km (9.6 mi)
- Basin size: 50 km^{2} (19 mi^{2})

Basin features
- River system: Wadi Safad / Wādī Şafad
- Tributaries
  - left: Wadi Thayb / Wādī Thе̄b

Wadi Safad (Arabic: وادي صفد, romanized: Wādī Ṣafad), is a valley or dry river, with ephemeral or intermittent flow, which flows almost exclusively during the rainy season, located northeast of the United Arab Emirates, in the Emirate of Fujairah.

It forms its own drainage basin, which covers an area of approximately 50 km^{2} (19 mi^{2}).

The wadi originates on the northern slope from Jabal Jabsah / Jabal Yabsah (874 m (2,867 ft)), and runs from west to east, zigzagging between the steep, low-lying hills south of the Shimayliyah Range, composed almost entirely of harzburgite, with a very steep and rugged relief, which generally culminates in narrow, rocky peaks. As harzburgite is easily weathered at the ground surface, the slopes in this range, which have little vegetation, are often littered with small eroded chips, which make for treacherous climbs.

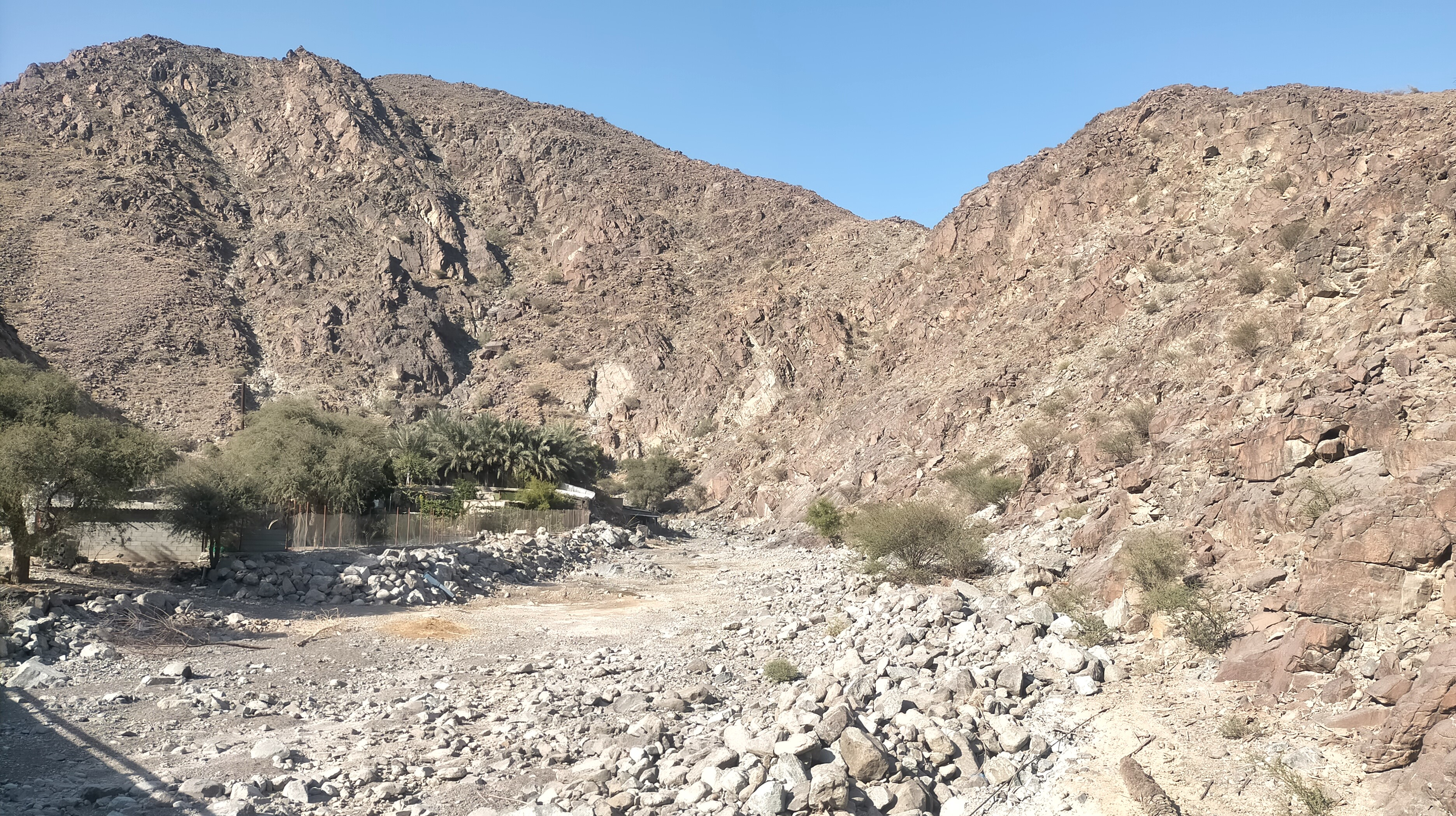
Wadi Safad, shortly before the Wadi Safad Breaker (B)

Along the upper and middle reaches of the Wadi Safad, and on its slopes, there are vestiges of ancient villages, cultivation terraces and palm groves, which show that in the not-so-distant past the wadi had a large permanent population, dedicated mainly to agriculture and livestock.

The channel of its lower course, where the wadi meets its only major tributary, the Wadi Thayb / Wādī Thе̄b, has been transformed and diverted from its natural path as it approaches the suburbs and industrial areas of coastal towns, due to the construction of roads, industrial estates and new housing developments.

== Archaeological studies ==
An initial archaeological survey carried out in Wadi Safad in 1994 revealed a series of pre-Islamic stone cairns, similar to those found in southern Ras al Khaimah, in the Wadi Qor, and even to the tombs of Wadi Suq. The later Islamic presence is especially characterized by cultivation terraces, defined by stone buttresses, with associated irrigation systems.

Later studies allowed the identification of other archaeological remains of the country's late pre-Islamic period (16th & 17th centuries), which stand on a hilltop overlooking a bend in the wadi, before the village of Safad Al Qrayyah (coordinates: 25°13'08.0"N 56°18'25.3"E), and include a fortified husn, (Note: A husn (from Arabic حصن, meaning "fortress" or "castle") is a term used in the Arab world to refer to a fortification or defensive structure, usually built to protect a city, town, or strategic area. Husns are often located at elevated or strategic locations, such as hills, to offer a defensive advantage against potential invaders.) with a Quranic inscription, a neighbouring mosque, variety of houses, and a graveyard on the southern slope.

== Dams and Reservoirs ==
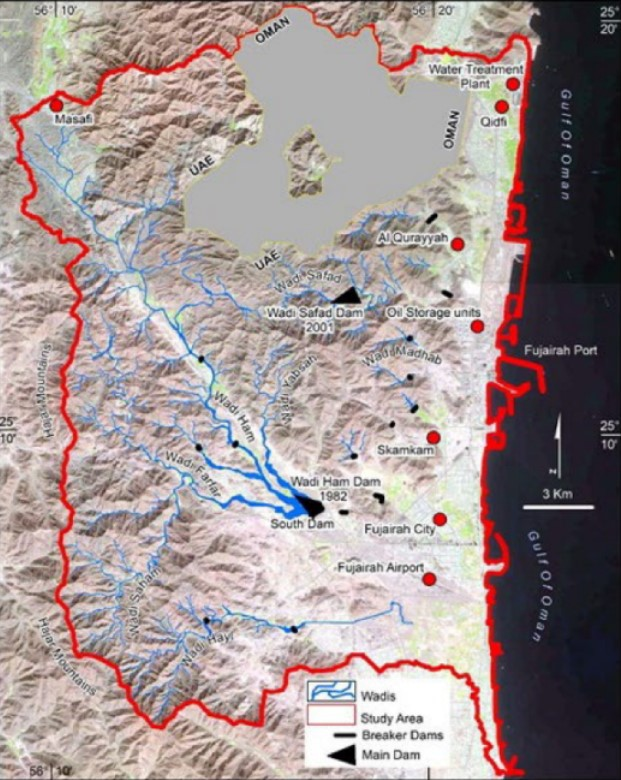
Wadi Safad, Wadi Ham and others - Map - Areas at increased risk of flooding, in the arid region near Fujairah City (UAE)

As in other regions of the UAE, the coastal area of Fujairah has occasionally been affected by unusually heavy rainfall and flooding.

To prevent the danger of flash flooding and increase the potential for recharging groundwater, a dam was built in 2001 on the Wadi Safad, a 17-meter-high dam, with a reservoir of 0.072 km^{2} (0.028 mi^{2}) and a capacity of 0.26 million cubic meters, called Wadi Safad Dam (12A) (coordinates: 25°13′16″N, 56°17′54″E).

Also in 2001, two smaller dams were built, the Wadi Safad Dam (12B) (coordinates: 25°13′9″N, 56°18′48″E), with a height of 3 meters and a reservoir with a capacity of 0.0025 million cubic meters; and the Wadi Safad Dam (12C) (coordinates: 25°13′22″N, 56°20′26″E), also 3 meters high, and a reservoir with a capacity of 0.07 million cubic meters.

== Toponymy ==
Alternative names: Wādī Şafad, Wadi Safad

The name and cartographic references of Wadi Safad was recorded in the documentation and maps produced between 1950 and 1960 by the British Arabist, cartographer, military officer and diplomat Julian F. Walker, during the work carried out to establish borders between the then called Trucial States, later completed by the Ministry of Defence of the United Kingdom, on 1:100,000 scale maps published in 1971.

In the National Atlas of the United Arab Emirates it appears with the spelling Wādī Şafad.

== Population ==
The whole area around Wadi Safad was historically populated by the Sharqiyin tribe, mainly the Hafaitat / Ḩufaitāt tribal section.

== See also ==
- List of wadis of the United Arab Emirates
- List of mountains in the United Arab Emirates
- List of wadis of Oman
- List of mountains in Oman
