= Nahwa =

Nahwa النحوة
- Village
- Nahwa
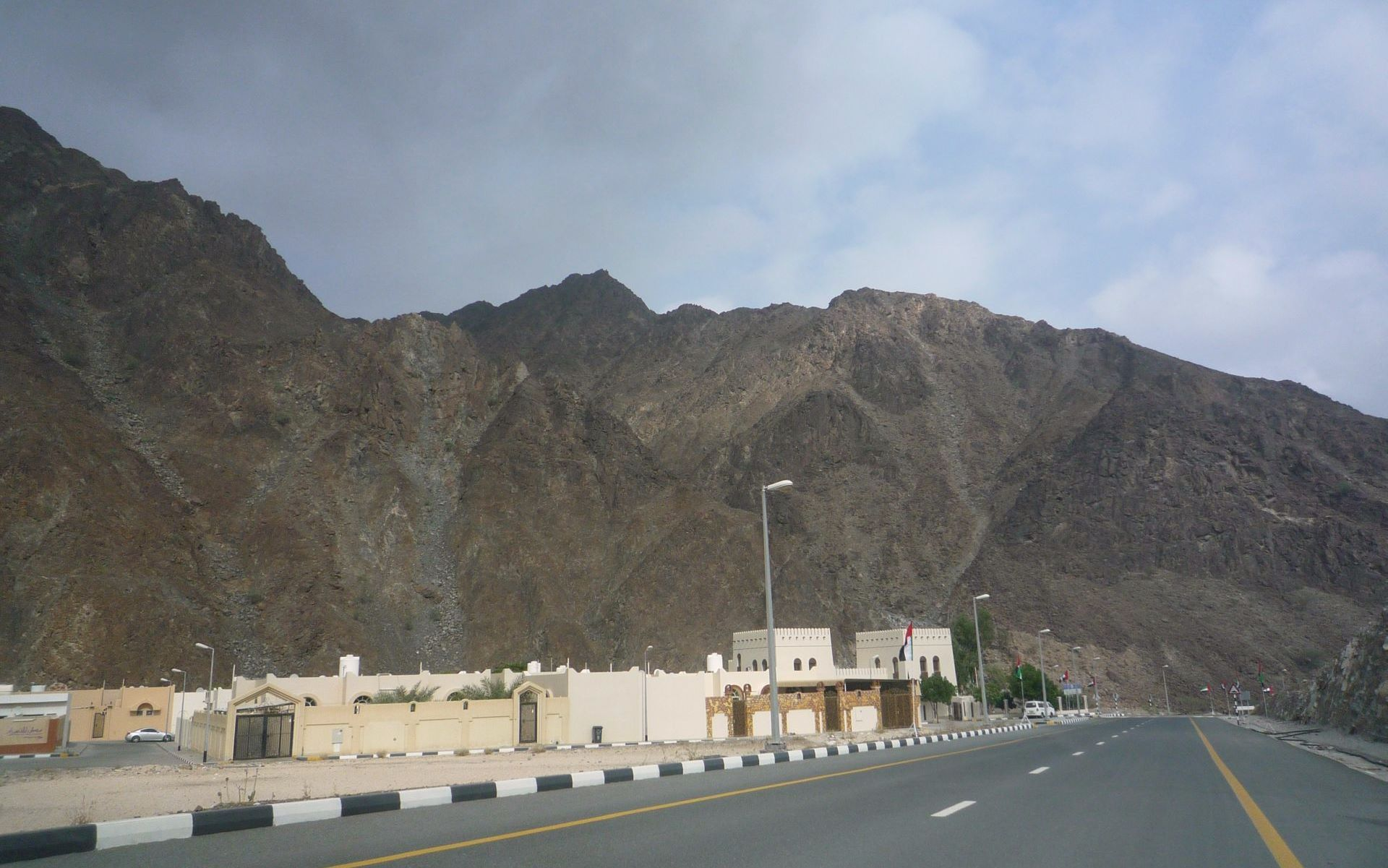
- New Nahwa

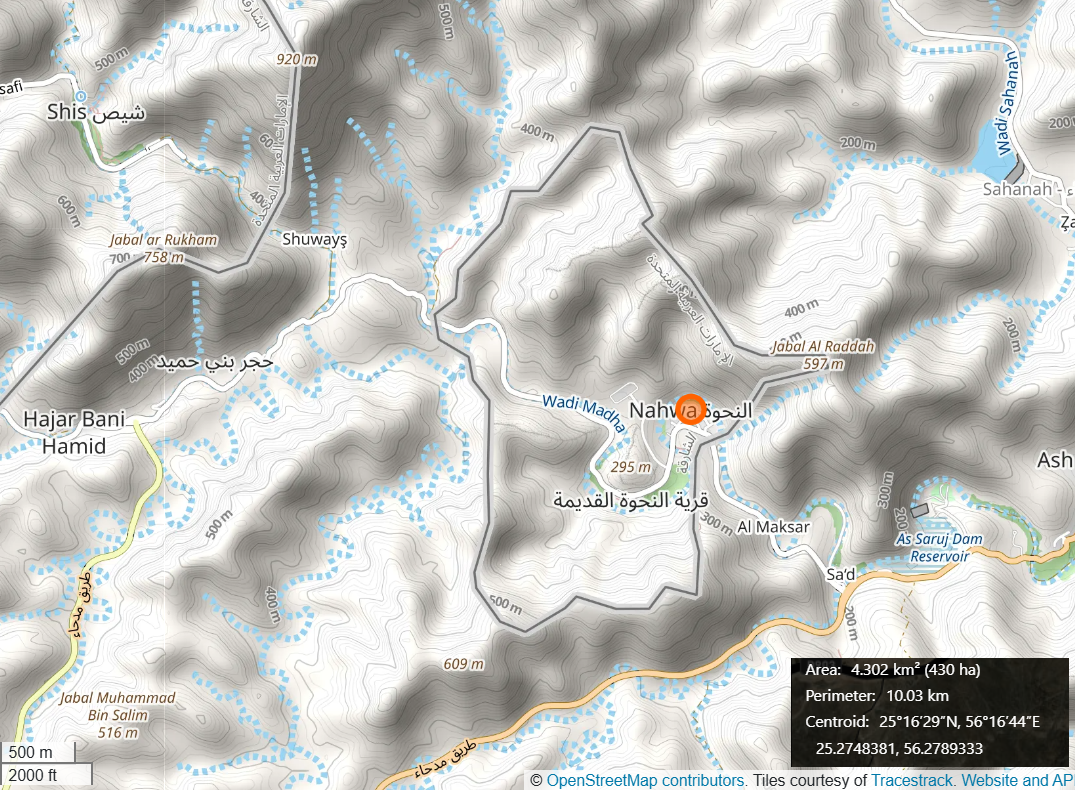
- Location and border limits of Nahwa

- Location of Nahwa Nahwa (Persian Gulf)
- Coordinates: 25°16′6″N 56°16′49″E
- Country: United Arab Emirates
- Emirate: Sharjah

Government
  - Emir: Sultan bin Muhammad Al-Qasimi

Area
  - Total: 4.40 km^{2} (1.70 sq mi)
- Elevation: 506 m (1,660 ft)

Population (2015)
  - Total: 302
- Time zone: UTC+4 (UAE standard time)

Nahwa is a territory that forms part of the Emirate of Sharjah in the United Arab Emirates. It is a counter-enclave (or second-order enclave) within the Omani territory of Madha, which is itself an exclave of Oman and an enclave within the United Arab Emirates.

Access to the village of Nahwa is through the northernmost road into the Madha enclave south of Khor Fakkan which leads to New Madha. From New Madha, there is a paved but winding road (about 5 km (3 mi)) leading to Nahwa.

Entering Nahwa, there is an Emirati police outpost some 80 metres (260 ft) after the boundary marker. The village itself is further up the road, on the same side as the police outpost. It consists of about 40 buildings and has its own clinic. This part of the village is called New Nahwa, and there are more houses further down the road in Old Nahwa. The third part of Nahwa is the village of Shis.

While the situation is uncommon, Nahwa is not the only exclave in the world surrounded by another enclave; some exclaves of Dutch Baarle-Nassau are embedded in Belgian Baarle-Hertog enclaves.

== History ==
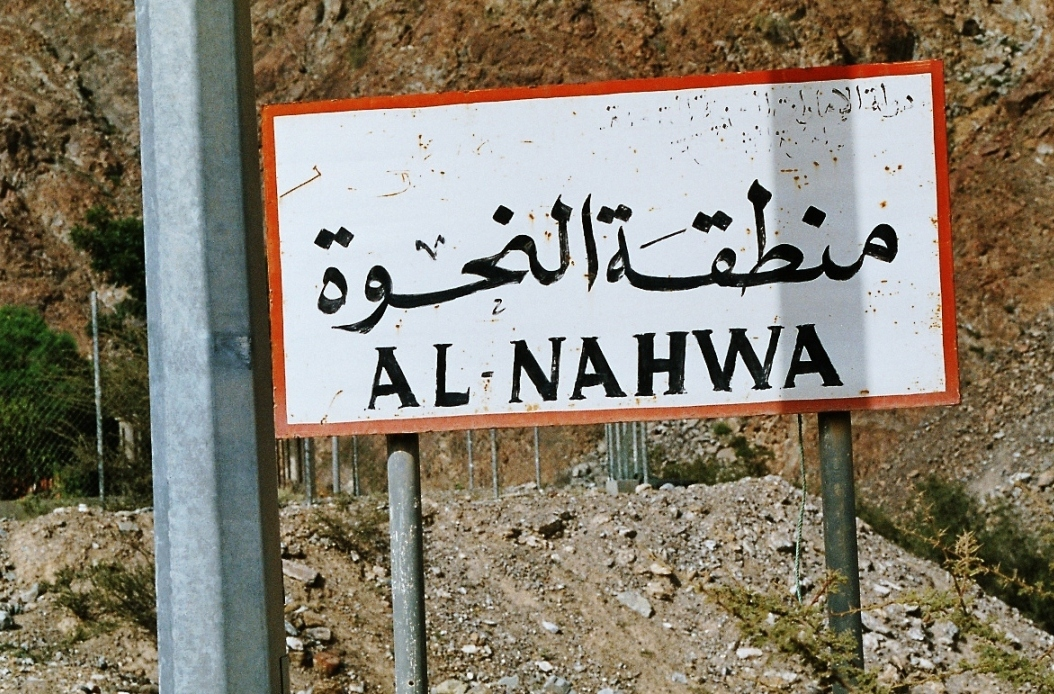
Entering Nahwa

Nahwa's counter-enclave was formed as a result of Madha's decision to declare allegiance to Oman instead of Al Qawasim of Sharjah, Al Qawasim of Ras Al Khaimah, or Al Sharqi of Fujairah which today all form part of the United Arab Emirates.

In the late 1930s or early 1940s the leaders of the four rival clans who ruled the Musandam Peninsula (Al Qassimi of Ras Al Khaimah, Al Qassimi of Sharjah, Al Sharqi of Fujairah, and the Bu Said of Oman) gathered a group of village elders of the nearby village of Madha and posed the question as to which sheikhdom the Madhanis would declare allegiance. While Madha chose Oman, Nahwa chose to stay loyal to Al Qawasim of Sharjah, effectively making them a counter enclave within the exclave of Madha. Following consultations between the area's tribes and Julian F. Walker, the British representative to the Trucial States, the borders were established and later finalized in 1969.

== Places of interest ==
Al Nahwa Cave is a cave and archaeological site on Nahwa in northern Khor Fakkan, Emirate of Sharjah. Remains were discovered here in the 1930s.
