= Madha =

Madha مَدْحَاء
- Wilayah
- Madha
- Sultan Qaboos Mosque in Madha
- Interactive map of Madha
- Location in Oman Madha (United Arab Emirates)
- Coordinates: 25°17′4″N 56°19′59″E
- Country: Oman

Government
  - Sultan: Haitham bin Tariq Al Said
  - Governor: Sayyid Ibrahim bin Said al Busaidy
  - Wāli: Ra'ad al-Busaidy

Area
  - Total: 93.34 km^{2} (36.04 sq mi)
- Elevation: 41 m (135 ft)

Population (2022)
  - Total: 4,306
- Time zone: UTC+4 (GST)

Madha (Arabic: مَدْحَاء, romanized: madḥāʾ) is an exclave of Oman entirely surrounded by the United Arab Emirates (UAE). Administratively, it is a province (wilayah) belonging to the Musandam Governorate.

The territory is situated halfway between the Musandam Peninsula and the Omani mainland. Madha contains a counter-enclave (a second-order enclave) called Nahwa, which is a territory belonging to the UAE Emirate of Sharjah.

The exclave is on the Fujairah–Khor Fakkan road, which is mostly in the Emirate of Sharjah, and covers approximately 93.34 km^{2} (36.04 sq mi). There are two exits to Madha on the Fujairah–Khorfakkan road. This territory is the only territory between UAE and Oman which is not lined with any barrier and there is no border crossing between Madha, Nahwa, and the surrounding UAE.

== History ==
At the start of the 19th century, Madha belonged to the Qawasim of Ras Al Khaimah but the Shihuh of Dibba Bai'ah took it by force some time between 1869 and 1900. From that point, they had been aligned with the Shihuh from Dibba Bai'ah and their leader Muhammad bin Salih. The Madhanis determined that there was no point of staying with him and they needed a stronger government.

In the late 1930s or early 1940s, the leaders of the four rival clans who ruled the Musandam Peninsula (Al Qassimi of Ras Al Khaimah, Al Qassimi of Sharjah, Al Sharqi of Fujairah, and the Bu Said of Oman) gathered a group of village elders of Madha and posed a question as to which sheikhdom the Madhanis wanted to have allegiance to. While all the other villages and towns around them (including the village of Nahwa that is within Madha) aligned themselves with the ruling families of Sharjah, Fujairah and Ras Al Khaimah, the Madhanis were swayed by the local representative, or wali, of the sultan of Oman Hamad bin Saif Al bu Sa'idi. The Madhanis chose Oman in the 1930s based on the firm belief that Oman was wealthier, had a stronger government, and would be better placed to protect the village's water supply. The boundary was settled in 1969 and Madha residents' decision to align with Oman made them an exclave of the Sultanate of Oman.

Madha is mostly empty, with the developed portion, called "New Madha", containing roads, a school, post office, an 'Eid ground, police station, an Omani bank, electricity and water supply, and an airstrip. There is also a Royal Oman Police patrol.

The territory of Madha is sparsely populated.

In 2014, it was announced that a museum would be built to house the collection of local historian Mohammed bin Salem al Mad’hani.

== Tourist attractions ==
=== Madha Fort ===
A number of historical structures can be found in Madha, including the Madha Fort, which is thought to have been constructed in the 17th century under the rule of Sultan bin Saif Al-Yarubi. The fort is built according to traditional Omani architecture styles.

=== Water springs ===
In the Wilayat of Madha there are some water springs, such as: Ain Al-Samay, which has a flow rate of three liters per second, and Ain Hajar Bani Hamid, which has a flow rate of about four liters per second.

=== As Saruj Dam ===
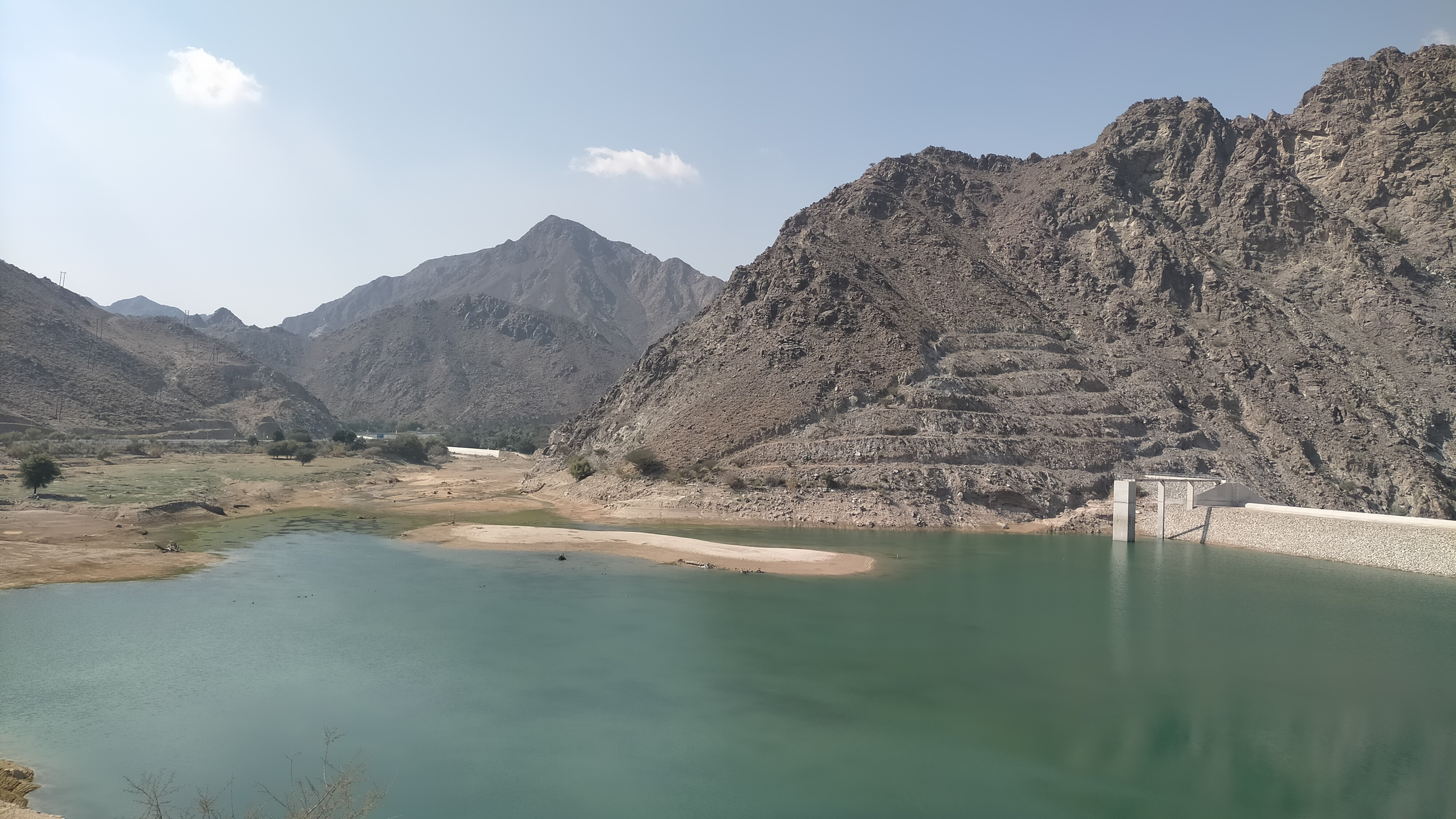
Wadi Madha. As Saruj Dam, Oman

As Saruj Dam is one of the city's main attractions. The dam allows for the accumulation of rain, creating a lake of fresh water. It was built in 2004 in Wadi Madha, just before the village of As Saruj (Oman), and was therefore named As Saruj Dam. It has a height of 25.5 m (84 ft) and a reservoir with a capacity of 1.35 million cubic meters (coordinates: 25°16′4″N, 56°17′58″E).

=== Madha Banyan Trees ===
In the farming area a group of well-established banyan trees are found. The farming area is watered by falaj system with water coming from the mountain springs.

=== Madha House Museum ===
In 1976, Muhammad bin Salem Al Madhani founded the Madha House Museum. It holds his collection of numerous items and antiques from before the birth of Christ, including pottery, coinage, and agricultural implements.

Inscriptions on stones, fragments of arrows, spears, and other ancient weaponry as well as seals, timepieces, and various Omani rocks are also included.

The museum displays a number of documents, manuscripts, and historical coins dating back to the 10th century, such as: a Greek silver coin used during the reign of Alexander the Great, a very small coin with a star made of stone on both sides, and a group of coins that were minted during the Umayyad and Abbasid eras.

=== Cultural festivals ===
Additionally, Madha is well-known for its annual cultural festivals. These celebrations feature traditional music and dance performances, culinary festivals, and arts and crafts exhibitions as they honor the region's rich history and culture.

== Climate ==
Madha is a mountainous area with rugged terrain, and the climate is hot and dry in the summers and mild in winters.

Climate data for Madha (2000–2009)
Month	Jan	Feb	Mar	Apr	May	Jun	Jul	Aug	Sep	Oct	Nov	Dec	Year
Mean daily maximum °C (°F)	23.4 (74.1)	24.1 (75.4)	27.2 (81.0)	31.6 (88.9)	36.6 (97.9)	37.8 (100.0)	36.7 (98.1)	35.8 (96.4)	34.9 (94.8)	33.4 (92.1)	29.4 (84.9)	25.5 (77.9)	31.4 (88.5)
Mean daily minimum °C (°F)	15.0 (59.0)	16.1 (61.0)	19.0 (66.2)	22.9 (73.2)	27.6 (81.7)	29.6 (85.3)	30.8 (87.4)	29.8 (85.6)	27.7 (81.9)	23.7 (74.7)	20.0 (68.0)	17.1 (62.8)	23.3 (73.9)
Average rainfall mm (inches)	17.4 (0.69)	8.5 (0.33)	13.7 (0.54)	3.7 (0.15)	0.1 (0.00)	0.3 (0.01)	0.4 (0.02)	0.0 (0.0)	trace	0.3 (0.01)	6.5 (0.26)	17.9 (0.70)	68.8 (2.71)
Source: World Meteorological Organization
