= Turkey–United Arab Emirates relations =

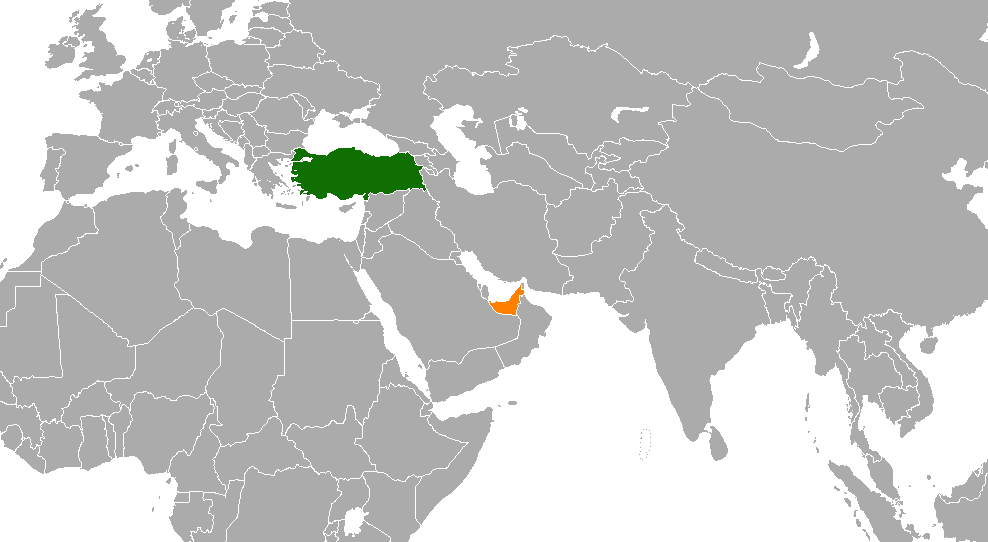

- Turkey: United Arab Emirates

Turkey and the United Arab Emirates share extensive cultural, military, and economic ties, but their relations substantially deteriorated during the Arab Spring. However, relations between the two countries have significantly improved in recent years.

== Economic relations ==
Turkey is one of the UAE's largest trading partners, with US$9 billion in annual bilateral trade volume - triggering a rise of 800 percent in the last seven years; the year of 2008 saw foreign trade figures reveal Turkey as one of the UAE's top 10 biggest suppliers while over the past five years (2004-2008), UAE's exports to Turkey have increased six-fold. In an attempt to enhance tourism bonds, the UAE launched new Etihad Airways flights to Istanbul in 2009, serving the city four times a week.

Emirati businessmen have been encouraged by multiple real estate agencies to invest in Turkey, as part of Turkey's ongoing privatization efforts. In 2010, both sides pledged on improving commercial relations through common projects and convene officials in the future to determine possible areas of cooperation.

There is considerable Turkish presence in the UAE including Turkish construction companies which have put their signature on many developments in the region. In addition, there is a small community of Turks in the United Arab Emirates. According to the Turkish embassy, the number of Turkish companies established in the UAE is over 400, with 75 of those operating in and around Abu Dhabi.

On 24 November 2021, Turkey and the United Arab Emirates signed accords on energy and technology investments after talks between President Recep Tayyip Erdoğan and Abu Dhabi Crown Prince Sheikh Mohammed bin Zayed al-Nahyan in Ankara.

== Diplomatic relations ==
=== Arab Spring ===
==== Egyptian Crisis ====
The diplomatic relations between the two countries have soured over differing attitudes to the Egyptian crisis and its aftermath, with Turkey backing the Muslim Brotherhood of Egypt and the UAE supporting military rule under President Abdel Fattah el-Sisi.

==== Syrian Civil War ====
In August 2017, the UAE accused Turkey of "colonial and competitive behavior" by "trying to reduce the sovereignty of the Syrian state" through its military presence in Syria.

The UAE has provided support for the Kurdish-dominated Syrian Democratic Forces, which fought against Turkish troops in northern Syria. Turkey has accused the UAE of also supporting the Kurdistan Workers' Party in its conflict with the Turkish government.

In March 2018, Gargash stated that relations between the countries "aren’t in their best state" and called on Turkey to "respect Arab sovereignty and deal with its neighbors with wisdom and rationality".

In May 2018, Gargash called for Arab countries to unite against rising Turkish and Iranian influence in the Middle East.

After the fall of the Assad regime, the United Arab Emirates supported the new administration in Damascus along with Turkey.

==== Yemeni Civil War ====
In May 2018, Turkey expressed concern towards the deployment of Emirati troops in Socotra without the Yemeni government being informed beforehand, claiming it presents "a new threat to the territorial integrity and sovereignty of Yemen".

=== 2016 Turkish coup d'état attempt ===
Turkish media in 2017 accused UAE of supporting the 2016 Turkish coup d'état attempt, with a Turkish columnist claiming that UAE financially supported the coup plotters. Turkish media also alleged that a series of leaked emails in June 2017 by Emirati ambassador to United States Yousef Al Otaiba correspondence with Foundation for Defense of Democracies, a Washington, D.C. based think tank, led credence to the alleged support.

=== Qatar diplomatic crisis and deterioration of ties (2017-2021) ===
The UAE has been critical of Turkey's backing of Qatar during the 2017–18 Qatar diplomatic crisis.

In May 2017, the UAE's Ambassador to the United States, Yousef Al Otaiba described Turkey under Erdoğan as a "long-term threat" to both the UAE and the United States.

In December 2017, the UAE's foreign minister, Abdullah bin Zayed Al Nahyan, shared a tweet that claimed an Ottoman general had robbed Medina during Ottoman rule. Turkish President Recep Tayyip Erdoğan responded by describing him as an "impertinent man" who was "spoiled by oil". Emirati diplomat Anwar Gargash responded, "The sectarian and partisan view is not an acceptable alternative, and the Arab world will not be led by Tehran or Ankara."

==== Armenia-Azerbaijan ====
In 2019, the United Arab Emirates' leadership announced it would begin the formal process to recognize the Armenian genocide. Emirate of Abu Dhabi had become the first emirate to recognize the genocide in April 2019. Although the United Arab Emirates continues to have good relations with Azerbaijan, both are oil producing countries that have ties to Israel.

During the 2020 Nagorno-Karabakh war, Armenian President Armen Sargsyan was invited to deliver a speech on the Emirati–Saudi Arabian channel Al Arabiya, urging the international community to stop Turkey from intervening in the conflict. However, the Emirati government decided to remain neutral throughout the conflict and not harm its cordial ties with Azerbaijan. Both Azerbaijan and the United Arab Emirates are energy-producing countries with ties to Israel in opposing Iranian influence. Armenia is closer to Iran, as both countries are critical of Azerbaijan and Turkey, and Iran has historically sided with Armenia on border issues.

Following the end of the Second Nagorno-Karabakh War and the Emirati-Turkish reconciliation, the UAE leveraged its friendly ties with Turkey and diminishing Iranian influence to strengthen relations with both Armenia and Azerbaijan. Iran was seen as the biggest loser in the Second Nagorno-Karabakh War, while Russia continued to work with Azerbaijan and Turkey. Russia also has friendly ties with the Emirates.

==== 2020 Abraham Accords ====
Turkey condemned the establishment of diplomatic relations between Israel and UAE in 2020. The Turkish government threatened to suspend diplomatic relations and recall its ambassador from Abu Dhabi over the establishment of Israel-UAE diplomatic relations.

=== Cooperation since 2021 ===
Turkey and the UAE reconciliation efforts started to make progress in 2021 with the visit of UAE Crown Prince Mohammed bin Zayed to Turkey. Erdoğan visited Abu Dhabi in 2022 to meet UAE Crown Prince Mohammed bin Zayed and signing currency swap and trade agreements between the two countries as well as talks of cooperation in the defense industry. Erdoğan's visit was welcomed in a big ceremony to show a shift in the relations in a positive direction. Turkey agreed to sell Bayraktar drones to the UAE as part of restoring relations and increasing cooperation between the nations. Turkish drones proved to be superior in quality to their Chinese counterparts and easier to acquire than American drones. Additionally, the common mistrust of the Biden administration between both countries enabled deeper cooperation over America's decision to not deliver F-35s to Turkey and the UAE, while approving F-35s to Israel and other Western countries.

During the 2023 Turkey–Syria earthquakes, amongst the Gulf Cooperation Council members, UAE assisted Turkey the most in earthquake relief aid efforts, allocating $114.6 million for earthquake relief efforts in Syria and Turkey. The significant role of the Emirates during the earthquakes has played a role on improvement of relations between the two nations.

Turkey and the UAE were the targets of the US sanctions due to their ties with Russia. Both Turkey and the UAE remains key destinations for many Russians since the start of the Russo-Ukrainian War and both countries have good relations with Russia.

The UAE, Turkey, Iraq, and Qatar have agreed to invest on the Iraq Development Road project. The project is expected to significantly boost Iraq's economy while increasing cooperation between the Gulf nations and Turkey; it will also challenge the India–Middle East–Europe Economic Corridor, highlighting the UAE's ambitions to diversify its economic and geopolitical interests.

In July 2025, MbZ visited Ankara to meet with Erdoğan and further strengthen ties between the two countries. The two leaders emphasized the importance of cooperation in cultural, security, and social fields, and agreed strengthening the bonds between the Emirati and Turkish peoples.

The UAE and Egypt are also interested in Turkey's fifth-generation fighter TAI TF Kaan project, amid growing military ties between the countries. Both Egypt and the UAE are BRICS member states, Turkey has also shown interest to join BRICS.

In October 2024, the central banks of the United Arab Emirates and Turkey signed a bilateral currency swap agreement. The agreement is designed to provide local currency liquidity to financial markets.

In 2026, there were reports of talks between the UAE and Turkey regarding Turkey's possible sale of the S-400 system to the UAE; to further diversify the anti-air capabilities against Iranian attacks.

==== Gaza (2023-present) ====
The UAE welcomed Gaza ceasefire announcement and thanked Qatar, Egypt, and Turkey for their work on the peace pact. Turkey, together with the United States, Egypt, and Qatar became one of the mediators of the Gaza peace plan. Sheikh Mansour bin Zayed met with President Erdoğan during the Gaza peace summit in Egypt.

==== Syria (2024-present) ====
Ties between the two countries continued to grow after the fall of the Assad regime. The Emirates, along with Turkey, supported the new government in Syria. Although the UAE had been perceived as softening its stance on the Assad regime in recent years, the Emirates decided to support the new government in Syria along with other regional powers. The United Arab Emirates agreed to invest in Syria, along with other Gulf countries. The new Syrian authorities agreed to detain leftist and Islamist groups that pose threat to Syria's national security and ties with other Arab nations or Turkey. The UAE and Azerbaijan also mediated talks between Israel and Syria in an effort to prevent further escalation.

== Resident diplomatic missions ==
- Turkey has an embassy in Abu Dhabi and a consulate-general in Dubai.
- United Arab Emirates has an embassy in Ankara and a consulate-general in Istanbul.

== See also ==
- Foreign relations of Turkey
- Foreign relations of the United Arab Emirates
- List of ambassadors of Turkey to the United Arab Emirates
- Saudi Arabia–Turkey relations
- Saudi Arabia–United Arab Emirates relations
- Qatar–Turkey relations
- Qatar–United Arab Emirates relations
