= Saudi Arabia–United Arab Emirates border =

International border

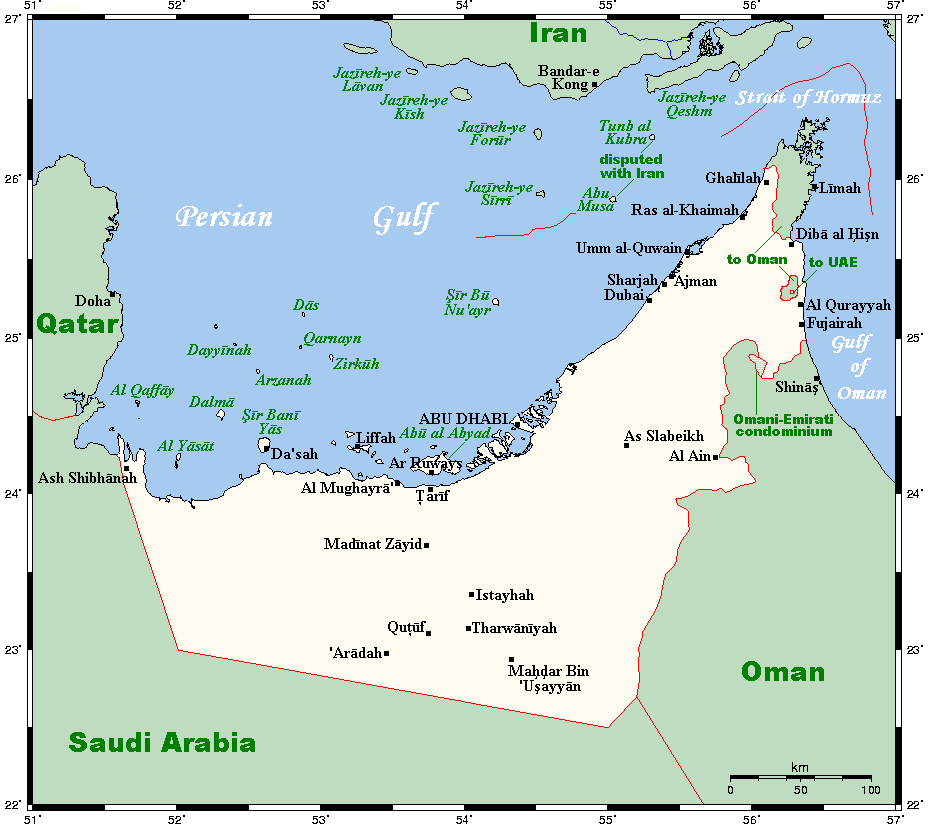
Map of United Arab Emirates, the boundary with Saudi Arabia reflecting the 1974 Treaty of Jeddah agreement.

The Saudi Arabia–United Arab Emirates border is 457 km (284 mi) in length and runs from the Persian Gulf coast in the west to the tripoint with Oman in the east.

The governments of Saudi Arabia and the United Arab Emirates signed the Treaty of Jeddah in Jeddah, Saudi Arabia, on 21 August 1974 between Faisal of Saudi Arabia and Sheikh Zayed bin Sultan Al Nahyan apparently ending a long-running boundary dispute, but according to the UAE the dispute has not been settled due to discrepancies between the oral agreement before the treaty's signing and the final text of the treaty itself. According to the UAE, the government did not notice this discrepancy until 1975 as a result of the absence of lawyers, technicians, and geographers on its negotiation team. The UAE has attempted to bring Saudi Arabia back to the negotiating table ever since.

The provisions of the 1974 treaty were not publicly disclosed until 1995, when it was lodged with the United Nations. However, the United Arab Emirates never ratified the agreement.

== Description ==
The border consists of four straight lines: the first begins in the west on the coast at the Sumayrah Gulf just west of the UAE's Ras Khumays (Ghumais) peninsula, proceeding southwards for 26 km (16 mi); the second is orientated northwest–southwest and runs for 166 km (103 mi); the third is orientated northwest–southeast and runs for 265 km (165 mi); and the fourth is orientated southwest–northeast and runs for 12 km (7.5 mi) up to the Omani tripoint. The border lies entirely within the desert, occasionally cutting across salt-flats such as the Sabkhat Matti.

== History ==
Historically there was no clearly defined boundary in this part of the Arabian Peninsula. During the 19th century, Britain had signed a number of protectorate treaties with seven emirates on what was then known as the 'Pirate Coast', giving rise to the so-called Trucial States. The interior of Arabia consisted of loosely organised Arab groupings, occasionally forming emirates, most prominent of which was the Emirate of Nejd and Hasa ruled by the al-Saud family. Britain and the Ottoman Empire theoretically divided their realms of influence in Arabia via the so-called 'Blue' and 'Violet lines' in 1913–14.

During the First World War an Arab Revolt, supported by Britain, succeeded in removing the Ottomans from much of the Middle East; in the period following this Ibn Saud managed to expand his kingdom considerably, eventually proclaiming the Kingdom of Saudi Arabia in 1932. Ibn Saud refused to recognise the Anglo-Ottoman lines and lay claim to large parts of the eastern Arabian hinterland (the so-called 'Hamza line').

On 25 November 1935 British officials met with Ibn Saud in an attempt to finalise a frontier between the new kingdom and its coastal protectorates, including the Trucial States. The conference proved abortive however and the issue remained unresolved.

=== Buraimi dispute ===
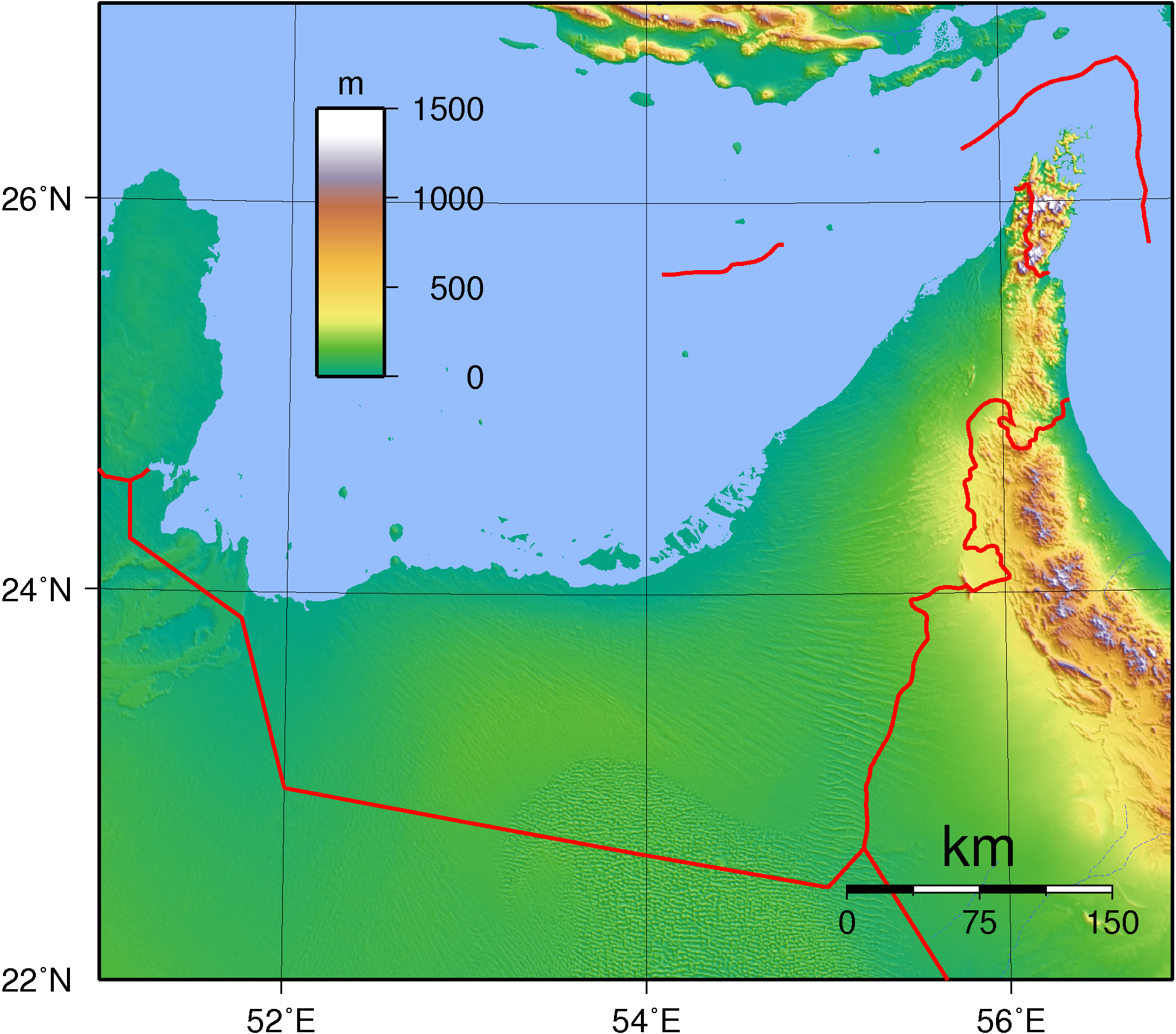
Map of the United Arab Emirates showing the pre-1974 boundary; note that by this map the UAE borders Qatar

In 1949, Saudi Arabia under the rule of Ibn Saud and Saudi Aramco had made incursions to the Western Region of the Emirate of Abu Dhabi, due to the prospect of getting oil. Ibn Saud was also interested in ruling the area of Al Ain and Al Buraimi, located in the Eastern Region of Abu Dhabi on its border with Oman. This led to the Buraimi Dispute. On 31 August 1952, a group of some 80 Saudi Arabian guards, 40 of whom were armed, led by the Saudi Emir of Ras Tanura, Turki bin Abdullah Al Otaishan, crossed Abu Dhabi territory and occupied Hamasa, one of three Omani villages in the oasis, claiming it as part of the Eastern Province of Saudi Arabia.

On 30 July 1954, it was agreed to refer the dispute to an international arbitration tribunal. Meanwhile, Saudi Arabia embarked on a campaign of bribery to obtain declarations of tribal loyalty on which its case was to be based. This campaign even extended to Sheikh Zayed bin Sultan Al Nahyan, brother of Sheikh Shakhbut, the Ruler of Abu Dhabi and at that time the wali of Al Ain. Zayed was approached by the Saudis, first with an offer of 50% of any oil revenues from the area, then a new car and 40,000 rupees. A third approach offered Zayed 400 million Rupees and finally, he was informed that the Saudi representative, Abdullah Al Qurayshi, wished to present him with three pistols.

In 1955 arbitration proceedings began in Geneva only to collapse when the British arbitrator, Sir Reader Bullard, objected to Saudi Arabian attempts to influence the tribunal and withdrew – one of the two judges to resign, the other being the Belgian President.

Given these breaches of the agreement, the British government decided to unilaterally abrogate the Standstill Agreement and take the oasis on 25 October 1955. On 25 October, the Trucial Oman Levies quickly took the oasis and captured all fifteen of the Saudi contingent under the Saudi Emir Bin Nami, who was shot and lightly wounded. The Saudi force was flown out on an RAF Valetta, which took them to Sharjah and then on to Saudi Arabia by sea. Most of the fighting took place after the surrender of the Saudis, with the Bedouin force of some 200 men putting up a spirited resistance to the Levies. After this incident Britain stated that it would unilaterally use a slightly modified version of the 1935 'Riyadh line' as the border henceforth.

=== Independence of the United Arab Emirates ===
After the declaration of independence of the United Arab Emirates in 1971, Saudi Arabia withheld the recognition of the country and Sheikh Zayed bin Sultan Al Nahyan as its President on the basis of territorial disputes with the Emirate of Abu Dhabi and continued to deal with the emirates as individual emirates bypassing the federal union. In 1974, King Faisal was asked by Sheikh Zayed that the UAE was in dire need of cooperation from Saudi Arabia in its recognition of the country and was asked to open the negotiations over the border issue. King Faisal used the tactic of non-recognition as a leverage against the Emirate of Abu Dhabi to make it reach a settlement quickly. King Faisal was already associated with the issue before 1974 as the minister of foreign affairs during the reign of his father King Abdulaziz. He has witnessed the failure of many meetings at which British officials sometimes represented Abu Dhabi. He felt the handling of the Buraimi dispute in which Saudi troops were defeated and forcibly removed was a great insult to the Kingdom and a blow to be avenged. King Faisal told the UAE delegation which visited him in Taif in July 1972 that Saudi Arabia had been humiliated in Buraimi and that it would have to retrieve its rights, vowing that it would not abandon property inherited from fathers and grandfathers. Sheikh Zayed was more eager for a settlement but Saudi Arabia's demand was unrealistic as it claimed the annexation of extensive lands in the Emirate of Abu Dhabi some of which contained a number of oil fields.

On 21 August 1974 an agreement was settled between Sheikh Zayed and King Faisal on the demarcation of the frontiers between Emirate of Abu Dhabi and Saudi Arabia. Saudi Arabia immediately declared recognition of the United Arab Emirates, sent its ambassador, and promoted its liaison office in Dubai into a consulate. The step strengthened the United Arab Emirate's position as a union and consolidated Sheikh Zayed's position as President.

=== Border dispute ===
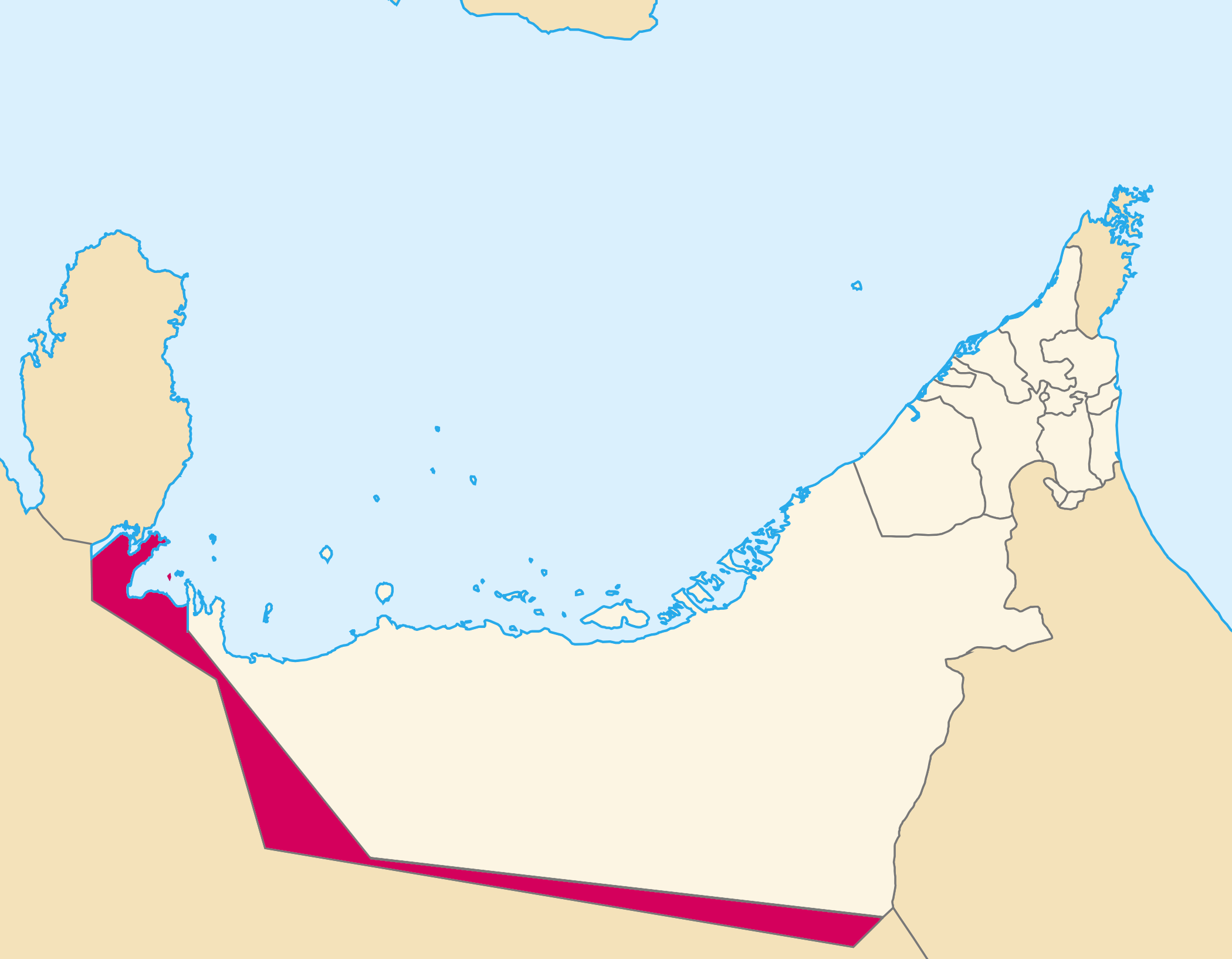
Map of the United Arab Emirates showing approximate difference between the Saudi border before and after the 1974 Treaty of Jeddah.

In 1976, Qatar and UAE agreed to establish a highway to link each other, however this was impeded by Saudi Arabia who stated that the construction company was operating on Saudi territory. Furthermore, Saudi Arabia hired a survey team to examine the possibility of building a port at Ras Ghumais located in UAE territory and awarding a contract to a Saudi-Irish company, arguing that the UAE borders were finalized and recognized in 1976 when King Khalid sealed the agreement. The Saudis hence succeeded in gaining 20 miles east of Ras Ghumais in another treaty in 1977 and gave Sheikh Zayed a cheque for $34.5 million. However, this treaty remained unrecognized internationally. According to author Anthony Cordesman, "the Saudi government forced Abu Dhabi to move its border 20 miles further east on the Gulf coast".

From 1974 until 1980 there were no physical Saudi checkpoints between Qatar and UAE; citizens of both countries moved freely back and forth without interference from the Saudi government until after the 1990s. The Saudis did not construct the actual road until after 1990. In June 1990 the direct land road connecting UAE and Qatar was closed for the first time and the Saudis opened a new road connecting Saudi territory with UAE through Al Sila and closed the old road connecting Abu Dhabi to the Qatari border. According to UAE military sources, the Saudi government paid money to Saudi tribes to relocate near Khor Al Udaid and claimed they had been living there for a long time as well as built various military infrastructure near the inlet.

In 2004, Emirati under-secretary of the Ministry of Foreign Affairs Abdulla Rashid Al Nuaimi told US ambassador Marcelle M. Wahba that the UAE signing the treaty in 1974 was a case of force majeure. In 2004, the UAE publicly raised the question of the boundary with Saudi Arabia and Sheikh Khalifa bin Zayed Al Nahyan, President of the UAE, asked Saudi Arabia for amendments. Saudi Arabia responded that the treaty had been closed in 1974, except for Article 5 which talks about delineating maritime boundaries. The UAE government publicly announced the dissatisfaction to allow changes to the Articles of the Jeddah Treaty. The public announcement of the dissatisfaction came a month after UAE's previous president Sheikh Zayed died, indicating that the UAE was not satisfied with the way the boundary issue was handled. Sheikh Khalifa raised the issue when he visited Riyadh in December 2004, but no solution occurred. In 2005, there were concerns that the border dispute might flare up again. In 2005, Sheikh Khalifa visited Qatar and a causeway project intended to link Doha to Abu Dhabi was announced, frustrating Saudi Arabia and causing them to protest that this causeway was passing through Saudi waters even though the maritime boundary between the two countries was not delineated. Emirati undersecretary of the Ministry of Foreign Affairs stated "We don't want to be separated from the Qataris by a slice of Saudi waters", implying that the causeway project was the only hope for Abu Dhabi to be connected to Qatar. In 2004, UAE and Qatar also jointly signed an agreement for the Dolphin Gas Project, which involves Qatar supplying gas to the UAE and Oman. In July 2006 the Saudi government protested the project, arguing that the pipeline passed through Saudi Arabia's claimed territorial waters. The UAE publicly reopened the dispute in 2006, claiming some lost territory.

== Treaty of Jeddah ==
The Jeddah Agreement granted Saudi Arabia a 25 km (16 mi) corridor eastwards from Khor Al Adaid, thus giving the Saudis an outlet to the Persian Gulf on the eastern side of Qatar. In return, the UAE was to keep six villages in the area of Al-Buraimi, including al-Ain, and most of al-Zafra desert. Al-Ain/Al-Buraimi oasis region consists of nine oases/villages, seven of which – Al Ain, Al Jaheli, Al Qattarah, Al Muwaiji, Al Hill, Al Masudi, and Al Muhtaredh – are today under Abu Dhabi's control, while the remaining three, namely Hamasa, Sa'ara and Buraimi, today belong to the Sultanate of Oman. Article 3 of the agreement stated that "all hydrocarbons in the Shaybah-Zarrara field shall be considered as belonging to the Kingdom of Saudi Arabia" and provided for exploration and development of the whole field by Saudi Arabia. Article 4 stipulated that Saudi Arabia and the UAE “each undertake to refrain from engaging in and from permitting the exploitation of hydro-carbons in that part of its territory to which the hydrocarbon fields primarily located in the territory of the other state extend."

=== Disputed articles ===
In 1992, the UAE wished to renegotiate the status of the treaty, specifically the 20% of Zararah that was located in Abu Dhabi's territory. In 1995, Saudi Arabia publicly published the text of the treaty for the first time, to make it clear that under Article 3 of the treaty, Saudi Arabia was given sole ownership of the associated oilfield, and thus there was no case for joint development of the oilfield. The UAE oil minister was the only GCC oil minister who did not attend the inauguration of the Shaybah oilfield in March 1999 as a way to indicate the UAE's long standing dissatisfaction with Jeddah Treaty Articles. According to a Saudi source, Sheikh Mohammed bin Zayed made more than two visits to Saudi Arabia in March and April 2011 with the intention of reaching a settlement regarding the 20 percent of Zararah oilfield that was located in Abu Dhabi territory. On 15 August 2011, an anonymous UAE diplomat stated that the UAE wanted to amend Article 3 to allow for oil sharing between the two nations, arguing that although this provision was not included in the final treaty, the country was within its rights to request such an amendment because Sheikh Zayed had "obviously" believed that the UAE and Saudi Arabia were agreeing to share the oil in August 1974.

The UAE also argued against Article 5 of the treaty, which stated that "both parties shall as soon as possible delimit the offshore boundaries between the territory of the Kingdom of Saudi Arabia and the territory of the United Arab Emirates." According to the UAE, the article cannot be settled due to a conflicting 1969 territorial agreement between Abu Dhabi and Qatar, as well as with the UAE-Qatar Dolphin Pipeline agreement of 2004.

Lastly, the UAE directly disagreed with Article 6 of the treaty, which stipulated that an international company would be required to prepare an official map to reflect the current boundaries between the two countries. The UAE continued to use the older version of the map which did not conform to the Treaty of Jeddah, showing Khor al-Udaid and the Zararah oilfield as UAE territory as late as 2009. In August 2009, this caused a problem for Emirati citizens entering Saudi Arabia, as their identification cards showed this disputed map and resulted in them being turned back at the border.

According to The Washington Institute for Near East Policy, it might be argued that the 1974 agreement is of questionable validity in terms of international law, as it has been neither published nor ratified by the UAE's Federal National Council, a crucial step to make the agreement binding on the parties. Likewise, Qatar, which suddenly discovered it no longer had a land border with the UAE, was not even a party to the negotiations.

== Border crossings ==
- Ghuwaifat-Batha

== See also ==
- Saudi Arabia-United Arab Emirates relations
