= Turks in Qatar =

Total population
- 5,000

Regions with significant populations
- Doha

Languages
- Turkish, Arabic

Religion
- Predominantly Sunni Islam; Minority Alevism, other religions, and irreligion

Turks in Qatar (Turkish: Katar'daki Türkler) form one of the country's smaller minority groups. When Turkish labour migration to Germany subsided in the mid-1970s, Turkish migrants began to migrate to Arab oil countries, especially Libya, Saudi Arabia and Iraq as well as Qatar. The Turkish government supported labour migration via Turkish construction companies in the Gulf Cooperation Council states. Over 90% of Turkish immigrants in Qatar are employed.

== See also ==
- Qatar–Turkey relations
- Turkish diaspora
- Immigration to Qatar
- Turks in Kuwait
- Turks in Lebanon
- Turks in Saudi Arabia
- Turks in the United Arab Emirates

== Bibliography ==
- Faist, Thomas (2000), The volume and dynamics of international migration and transnational social spaces, Oxford University Press, ISBN 0-19-829726-2.
- Organisation for Economic Co-operation and Development (2001), Trends in international migration: Continuous reporting system on migration. 25th annual report, 2000 edition, OECD Publishing, ISBN 92-64-18612-3.
