= Saudi Arabia–United Arab Emirates relations =

- Saudi Arabia: United Arab Emirates

Relations between Saudi Arabia and the United Arab Emirates (UAE) have been marked by tensions and disputes since before the UAE's independence, alongside areas of alignment and efforts to coordinate their military, political, economic, trade and cultural policies. Both countries are part of Eastern Arabia and the Middle East region and share a long border with each other. Both countries are members of the Arab League, the Organisation of Islamic Cooperation and the Gulf Cooperation Council.

Economic and geopolitical rivalries have contributed to tensions between the two countries, which have also played out through proxy conflicts in Sudan and Yemen.

Saudi Arabia maintains an embassy in Abu Dhabi and a consulate general in Dubai, while the UAE has an embassy in Riyadh and a consulate in Jeddah.

== History ==
=== Buraimi dispute ===
The Buraimi dispute in the 1940s and 1950s was a series of covert attempts by Saudi Arabia to influence the Al Buraimi area and parts of Al Ain, areas now divided between Oman and the United Arab Emirates. This resulted in an armed conflict and a territorial dispute between Saudi Arabia on one side and Oman and the Trucial States (today the UAE) on the other. The dispute eventually culminated with Saudi forces being pushed back from the region after the intervention of the Trucial Oman Scouts.

=== UAE independence (1971 – 1974) ===
After the declaration of independence of the United Arab Emirates in 1971, Saudi Arabia withheld the recognition of the country and of Sheikh Zayed bin Sultan Al Nahyan as its president, because of the territorial disputes that occurred in the Buraimi dispute with the Emirate of Abu Dhabi. Saudi Arabia continued to deal with the emirates individually rather than through the federal union. In 1974, Sheikh Zayed asked King Faisal of Saudi Arabia to recognize the UAE and to reopen the negotiations over the border dispute. Faisal regarded Saudi Arabia's defeat in the Buraimi dispute, during which Saudi troops had been forcibly removed, as a humiliation and an injustice that had to be corrected. When a UAE delegation visited him in Taif in July 1972, he said that Saudi Arabia had been humiliated in Buraimi and that it would reclaim its rights, stating that it would not abandon property inherited from earlier generations. Zayed was more eager for a settlement, but Saudi Arabia's demands were regarded as unrealistic, as they included extensive parts of the Emirate of Abu Dhabi, some containing oil fields.

On 21 August 1974, an agreement in the form of Treaty of Jeddah (1974) was settled between Zayed and Faisal which defined the border between the Emirate of Abu Dhabi and Saudi Arabia. Saudi Arabia immediately declared recognition of the United Arab Emirates, sent its ambassador, and promoted its liaison office in Dubai into a consulate.

=== Death of Sheikh Zayed ===
The relationship between the two countries before 2004 was described by Saudi political writer Khaled al-Dakhil as resembling that of an older and younger brother. In 2004, Sheikh Zayed died and was succeeded by Sheikh Khalifa bin Zayed Al Nahyan. Analysts said differences between Saudi Arabia and the UAE became more visible as a new generation of Emirati leaders sought a more equal relationship.

In 2001, the Gulf Cooperation Council had begun plans for a monetary union among its member states. The UAE withdrew from the planned monetary union in 2009 after Riyadh in Saudi Arabia was chosen over the UAE as the site of the proposed central bank, exposing Saudi-UAE rivalry.

In August 2009 Saudi authorities prevented Emirati nationals from entering their territory using ID cards that showed a map including territory currently administered by Saudi Arabia. The UAE responded that it had never ratified the 1974 agreement.

=== Rise of Mohammed bin Salman ===
During the 2013–14 period, according to the New York Times, the United Arab Emirates reportedly hired the NSO Group, an Israeli cyber intelligence firm, to intercept the calls of Saudi Prince Mutaib bin Abdullah, then-minister of the National Guard, who was considered a contender for the Saudi throne at the time.

During 2015, the United Arab Emirates hired lobbyists in the United States to promote then Saudi defense minister Mohammed bin Salman. In late 2015, Muhammad bin Nayef, then crown prince of Saudi Arabia, criticised Emirati lobbying in the United States, warning King Salman in a letter that Saudi Arabia faced a "dangerous conspiracy". He wrote to King Salman that “An Emirati plot has been exposed to help aggravate the differences within the royal court.” He also wrote “Bin Zayed is currently planning to use his strong relationship with the United States President to achieve his intentions.”

In hacked emails of UAE ambassador to the United States, Yousef Al Otaiba, dated to 2015 former CIA Director David Petraeus asked Al Otaiba if Muhammad bin Nayef still wielded influence, to which Otaiba replied, "MBS is definitely more active on most day to day issues. MBN seems a little off his game lately." In a separate email dated 2008, Al Otaiba described Saudi leadership to his wife as "f***in' coo coo!" over the Saudi religious police's 2008 decision to ban red roses on Valentine's Day. Another leaked email dated 21 May 2017, Otaiba noted: "Abu Dhabi fought 200 years of wars with Saudi over Wahhabism. We have more bad history with Saudi than anyone. But with Mohammed bin Salman we see a genuine change. And that's why we're excited. We finally see hope there and we need it to succeed." Otaiba received criticism in August 2017 from Saudi royals aligned with Muhammad bin Nayef after he claimed that the UAE and Saudi Arabia both desired more secular government in the Middle East which they saw as an implicit criticism of the Saudi status quo.

The relations between Saudi Arabia and UAE have strengthened significantly with the rise of Mohammed bin Salman as Crown prince of Saudi Arabia, with Mohammed bin Zayed being described by media as aiding his ascension to crown prince and serving as a "mentor" to Mohammed bin Salman.

=== 2015 Intervention in Yemen ===
In 2015, the United Arab Emirates joined Saudi Arabia for the Saudi-led intervention in Yemen against the Houthis. Despite their alliance, there were differences between the Saudi and Emirati approach to Yemen, such as the UAE's support for the separatists of the Southern Transitional Council and opposition to Al-Islah.

In July 2019, the UAE withdrew its forces from the Saudi-led intervention in Yemen following reported disagreements over the prospects of military victory, Emirati opposition to Islamist militias in northern Yemen, and Saudi support for Yemeni President Abdrabbuh Mansur Hadi. Since then, Saudi- and UAE-backed forces have occasionally engaged in hostility, and in December 2025 the STC took over the vast majority of Yemeni government territory. This has led to strained relations between the two countries.

Differences between Saudi Arabia and the UAE over Yemen later widened, contributing to the December 2025 escalation.

=== Shared and compatible positions ===
==== Qatar crisis ====
The UAE joined Saudi Arabia in the Saudi-led coalition of severing ties with Qatar due to Qatar's support for terrorism in 2017, causing the Qatar diplomatic crisis.

In May 2017, an unnamed source alleged that Saudi Arabia and UAE planned a joint Saudi-UAE invasion of Qatar which was ultimately abandoned due to opposition by the United States.

==== Saudi–Canada diplomatic dispute ====
In 2018, the United Arab Emirates backed Saudi Arabia in its August 2018 dispute with Canada.

==== Israel–UAE relations ====
Saudi Arabia has stayed silent on the issue of a 2020 agreement establishing relations between Israel and UAE in exchange for Israel to halt annexation of the West Bank. The agreement appeared at odds with the 2002 Arab Peace Initiative, which was spearheaded by Saudi Arabia, and would have required Israel to withdraw from all occupied territories in exchange for normal relations with Arab states. During the 2026 US-Iran war, in a sign of warming relations between Israel and the UAE, it was announced that Israel had provided the UAE with military advisors and a ballistic missile and drone defense system with soldiers to man it.

=== OPEC disputes and departure ===
In July 2021 OPEC meetings, Saudi Arabia and the United Arab Emirates had a dispute regarding oil production limits. UAE wanted to monetize its natural resources as quickly as possible before the transition away from fossil fuels. Saudi Arabia and the UAE later settled the difference with a compromise to unlock more oil supply.

In July 2023, Wall Street Journal reported that Saudi Arabia had threatened UAE with diplomatic repercussions in December 2022 over disagreements regarding UAE divergence in Yemen policy and OPEC limits, with Mohammed bin Salman reportedly gathering journalists in a meeting and claiming the UAE "stabbed us in the back". The UAE was allegedly frustrated at Saudi efforts to raise the global price of oil. Both Saudi Arabia and UAE denied strained relations.

In 2026, the UAE announced that it would leave OPEC, effective 1 May. This was the result of previous tensions and UAE dissatisfaction with the handling of the war with Iran.

=== 2023-present Sudanese civil war ===
Saudi Arabia and the UAE were aligned with different sides during the Sudan conflict, with Saudi Arabia being closer to Abdel Fattah al-Burhan and the Sudanese Armed Forces, while the UAE backed Hemedti's Rapid Support Forces. The Sudan war has been described as a proxy war between these states.

=== December 2025 escalation ===
In early December 2025, the UAE-backed Southern Transitional Council (STC) began the Southern Yemen campaign with an unexpected offensive in Hadhramaut Governorate in southern Yemen against forces supported by Saudi Arabia, including the Saudi-backed Government of Yemen and the Hadhramaut Tribal Alliance. On 8 December, the STC said that it had established broad control across the south of the country, including the port city of Aden, which for a decade had served as the base of Yemen's Saudi-backed, internationally recognized government.

The campaign angered Saudi Arabia and led to an unusually open split between the two regional powers. Observers see the offensive as a "rupture" in the two's bilateral relationship, with Saudi media outlets and commentators publishing attacks on UAE.

On 30 December, the Saudi-backed anti-Houthi Yemeni forces declared a state of emergency, cancelled its cooperation with the UAE and ordered all Emirati forces to withdraw from its territories within 24 hours. Saudi Arabia also publicly criticized the UAE and called for a full withdrawal, which UAE then announced.

That same day, a Saudi-led military coalition supporting Yemen's current government carried out an airstrike on two vessels docked at the port of Mukalla. According to the coalition, the two ships had delivered a large shipment of weapons and armored vehicles to the STC; later reports indicated that the cargo was meant for UAE military operations. On 10 January 2026, Yemen's government announced that it had retaken full control of areas previously held by the STC, including Aden.

The escalation in Yemen has been described as a proxy war between Saudi Arabia and UAE.

==== Diplomatic crisis ====
After the 2025 Southern Yemen campaign, tensions between the UAE and Saudi Arabia shifted to a more direct confrontation. Saudi media outlets and social media accounts increasingly criticised Emirati actions in Yemen, later broadening their criticism to include the UAE's regional security role and commercial investments, which they portrayed as poorly coordinated and damaging to Saudi interests. Saudi-aligned media also increasingly accusing the UAE of destabilizing the region, including in Sudan.

France24 described the Saudi media campaign against the UAE as a smear campaign. Middle East Monitor said the similarity of the Saudi media and social media messaging pointed to possible high-level approval of the media campaign. According to UAE University Professor of Political Science Abdulkhaleq Abdulla, the UAE declined to respond to the accusations because it did not want to provoke Saudi Arabia.

In February 2026, Reuters reported, citing two sources, that some Emirati companies had withdrawn from attending a major defense exhibition in Saudi Arabia, indicating increasing differences between the two countries.

== Economic relations ==
In 2010, despite tensions between the countries, Saudi Arabia was described as a key neighbour for the UAE, with many Saudi tourists visiting the UAE and the Saudi market remaining important for UAE-based manufacturers. Saudi investment in the UAE, particularly in finance and property, was widely thought to exceed UAE investment in Saudi Arabia.

== Resident diplomatic missions ==
- Saudi Arabia has an embassy in Abu Dhabi and a consulate-general in Dubai.
- The United Arab Emirates has an embassy in Riyadh and a consulate-general in Jeddah.

== See also ==
- Foreign relations of Saudi Arabia
- Foreign relations of the United Arab Emirates
