= List of ambassadors of Turkey to the United Arab Emirates =

The ambassador of Turkey to the United Arab Emirates is the official representative of the Republic of Turkey to the United Arab Emirates.

== List of ambassadors ==
Ambassador	Term start	Term end	Ref.
Metin Kuştaloğlu	3 December 1979	19 August 1982	
Taner Baytok	1 September 1982	15 January 1986	
Tugay Uluçevik	23 January 1986	27 September 1989	
Uğurtan Akıncı	1 September 1989	12 December 1991	
Ergün Pelit	23 December 1991	29 March 1994	
Ali Arsın	30 March 1994	13 March 1998	
Dr. Ercan Özer	13 March 1998	8 June 2001	
Ünal Ünsal	12 June 2001	12 January 2004	
Selim Karaosmanoğlu	14 January 2004	30 April 2008	
Hakkı Akil	7 May 2008	16 October 2009	
Şefik Vural Altay	19 October 2009	3 December 2014	
Mustafa Levent Bilgen	12 December 2014	1 October 2016	
Can Dizdar	1 October 2016	1 May 2021	
Tugay Tunçer	1 May 2021	Present	

== See also ==
- Turkey–United Arab Emirates relations
