= Kuwait–Turkey relations =

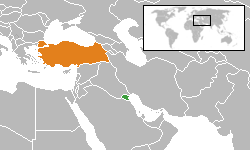

- Kuwait: Turkey

Diplomatic mission
- Embassy of Kuwait, Ankara: Embassy of Turkey, Kuwait City

Kuwait–Turkey relations are foreign relations between Turkey and Kuwait. The Ministry of Foreign Affairs in Turkey describes the current relations as being at "outstanding levels", owned by historical and religious links.. Bilateral trade between the two countries in 2016 was estimated to be worth around US$700 million by the Turkish Deputy Prime Minister, Mehmet Simek. Kuwait has an embassy in Ankara and a consulate-general in Istanbul, while Turkey has an embassy in Kuwait City.

The two countries have recently signed fifteen agreements for cooperation in tourism, health, environment, economy, commercial exchange and oil.

When Turkey was struck by an earthquake in 2011, Kuwait donated $250,000 for the victims through the UN Development Programme (UNDP).

In October 2018, Turkey and Kuwait signed a joint defense plan for 2019, aimed at enhancing bilateral military cooperation.

== History ==
Kuwait used to be under Ottoman rule until Kuwait became a British protectorate in 1899 named Anglo-Kuwaiti Agreement of 1899.

== See also ==
- Foreign relations of Kuwait
- Foreign relations of Turkey
- Turks in Kuwait
