= Hadhramaut Protection Forces =

Militant organization in Yemen

- قوات حماية حضرموت
- Leader: Amr bin Habrish
- Founded: 12 October 2025
- Country: Yemen
- Allegiance: Hadhramaut Tribal Alliance
- Active regions: Hadhramaut Governorate
- Wars: Yemeni civil war (2014–present); South Yemen insurgency; 2025–2026 Southern Yemen campaign; 2025 Hadhramaut offensive

Hadhramaut Protection Forces (Arabic: قوات حماية حضرموت, romanized: Qūwāt Ḥimāyat Ḥaḍramawt) is an armed wing of the Hadhramaut Tribal Alliance organization in Hadhramaut Governorate, Yemen.

== History ==
The group was founded on 12 October 2025, by the Hadhramaut Tribal Alliance and with its leader Amr bin Habrich Al-Alawi.

The Hadhramaut Protection Forces deployed their forces on 30 November, towards the facilities of PetroMasila, an oil company, According to Amr bin Habrish, the occupation was "to strengthen security in the area and defend national resources from any possible aggression or external interference", in addition to invading other oil fields, which led to Southern Transitional Council intervention in the 2025 Hadhramaut offensive. Backed by Saudi Arabia and established earlier this year, they called for "resistance" against the advance of the STC and accused the group of preparing to occupy the region.
