= Hadhramaut Tribal Alliance =

Militant group in the Yemeni Civil War

Hadhramaut Tribal Alliance حلف قبائل حضرموت
- President: Amr bin Habrish
- Headquarters: Ghayl bin Yamin
- Armed wing: Hadhramaut Protection Forces
- Ideology: Hadhrami nationalism

Party flag

The Hadhramaut Tribal Alliance, also known as the Hadhramaut Tribes Confederacy, is an armed group involved in the ongoing Yemeni Civil War. The Alliance's forces are primarily drawn from the Hadharem in southern Yemen. During the civil war, the Alliance is often cited as supporting the government of Yemeni President Abdrabbuh Mansur Hadi and is noted for operating alongside the Republic of Yemen Armed Forces in Hadhramaut.

== Operations ==
The Hadhramaut Tribal Alliance was formed in the Hadhramaut region of Yemen, where it actively sought to gain more autonomy from the Yemeni Government. In 2014 Alliance actively fought against militants aligned with Al-Qaeda in the Arabian Peninsula (AQAP), though it also issued statements in opposition to the Yemeni Government following a series of terrorist attacks in Seiyun, and members of the Alliance voiced doubts as to the effectiveness of the government's anti-terrorist campaigns. Following the outbreak of the Yemeni Civil War in 2015, civil infighting created a power vacuum in Southern Yemen. The lack of an organized government presence allowed for militant groups, most notably AQAP, to take control of parts of the region. In response, the Tribal Alliance and a number of other militia groups formed a centralized military command to coordinate the defense of the lands under their control. In April 2015 forces from these tribes retook land around the cities of Mukalla and Al-Shihr from AQAP and Ansar al-Sharia militants, whom had themselves captured Mukalla on 2 April. The Alliance participated in the Second Battle of Mukalla alongside Yemeni and UAE soldiers one year later in April 2016, and successfully drove AQAP and its affiliates out of Hadhramaut. In October 2025, formed their armed wing, Hadhramaut Protection Forces.
