= Qatar–Turkey relations =

- Qatar: Turkey

Diplomatic mission
- Embassy of Qatar, Ankara: Embassy of Turkey, Doha

The State of Qatar and the Republic of Türkiye established diplomatic relations in 1972. There has been ongoing cooperation and dialogue in regional and international issues since the 2010s, particularly in the Syrian civil war and the Egyptian Crisis. Both countries also have supported the same groups in post-Gaddafi Libya. Turkey provided diplomatic and food support to Qatar during the Qatar diplomatic crisis. Since November 2026, the two countries have had a mutual defense pact.

Qatar and Turkey maintain strong military ties. Several military cooperation agreements have been signed between the two, and Turkey exports military equipment to Qatar. For instance, Turkey sold Qatar its first-ever drones in March 2012, and in April 2017, Turkish vehicle manufacturer BMC signed a deal to supply Qatar with 1,500 Amazon 4x4 armored vehicles. Turkey has a military base in Qatar, and in June 2017, Turkish parliament fast-tracked the deployment of Turkish troops in Qatar. Turkey plans to eventually station 3,000 troops on Qatari soil.

Trade relations between the two countries have witnessed rapid developments in recent years. Qatar has signed agreements with Turkey to export LNG, while several Turkish construction companies have agreements with the Qatari government, many of which are involved in 2022 FIFA World Cup projects. In September 2017, a new trade line route between Qatar and Turkey via Iran was announced, and at the same time a shipping service between Turkey's Port of Mersin and Qatar's Hamad Port was also launched.

== Relations during the Ottoman period ==
Beginning in the late 19th century, the Ottoman Empire started campaigning to incorporate the provinces of Eastern Arabia into their empire. After establishing themselves on al-Hasa coast, they advanced towards Qatar, which had come to serve as a base of operations for Bedouins who opposed Ottoman rule. In 1871, in an attempt to secure a landing for Ottoman troops, they sent an envoy bearing an Ottoman flag to the proclaimed ruler of the Qatari Peninsula, Jassim bin Mohammed Al Thani. Although being of Wahhabi background, the Al Thani leader accepted and flew the flag, and by December of that year had authorised the Ottomans to send military equipment and 100 troops to Al Bidda. In January 1872, Qatar was formally incorporated into the Ottoman Empire as a province in Najd with Al Thani being appointed its kaymakam (provincial governor). Most Qataris were allowed to retain their previous positions in the new administration. The arrival of the Ottomans came three years after the end of the Qatari–Bahraini War. Until today, Turkey's relationship with Wahhabi Qatar is seen to be special, in contrast to the much-tenser relationship with fellow Wahhabi Saudi Arabia.

In 1890, the Ottomans attempted to further consolidate their influence over Qatar by imposing numerous administrative reforms, increasing taxes and stationing additional troops in their garrison at Al Bidda. This eventually led Jassim Al Thani to rebel against the Ottomans, who he believed were seeking to usurp control of the peninsula. He resigned as kaymakam and stopped paying taxes in August 1892. This, along with the March 1893 imprisonment of more than a dozen members of Qatari tribal leaders by the governor of Basra, Mehmed Hafiz Pasha, culminated in the Battle of Al Wajbah. After the Qataris defeated the Ottomans in that battle, Sultan Abdul Hamid II granted Jassim Al Thani a full pardon.

After the Young Turks assumed power in the Ottoman Empire in 1908, they declared they were renouncing their claims on Qatar on 29 July 1913. The last of the Ottoman troops in Qatar peacefully evacuated in August 1915. This move was seen as an attempt of currying the United Kingdom's favor.

== Political relations ==
=== Political cooperation ===
The history of bilateral relations between Qatar and Turkey date back to the 1970s. In the 1980s, the two nations began signing bilateral agreements with one another. Bilateral relations gained further traction in the 2000s with the signing of several additional agreements. Their coordination in regional politics, particularly in the Syrian Civil War and the Egyptian Crisis has led their relation to be described as an alliance. Both countries have rejected the designation of Hamas and the Muslim Brotherhood as terrorist entities. In 2006, after the election of Hamas in Gaza both Turkey and Qatar claimed Hamas to be a legitimate government. This drew both countries closer on the Palestine issue.

While commenting on the turmoil in the Middle East during a joint press conference held with Qatar in December 2014, President Recep Tayyip Erdoğan stated that "together with Qatar, we always side with oppressed people around the world". Both countries have several common regional threat-perception, patronize the same regional non-state actors (including in Syria) and share similar agendas in Syria, Libya, Egypt and elsewhere.

Qatar and Turkey's alliance have translated into closer cooperation in international organizations such as the UN and OIC. It was announced that Turkey and Qatar agreed to establish a cooperation council called 'High-level Strategic Cooperation Council' on 19 January 2015. This decision was revealed after a meeting between the countries' foreign ministers Mevlüt Çavuşoğlu and Khalid bin Mohammad Al Attiyah concerning the recent mutual diplomatic shifts away from Egypt since Abdel Fattah el-Sisi rose to power in 2014. The first meeting of the council took place in Doha that December, during a visit by President Erdoğan.

Following Turkish air strikes conducted in August 2015 over fighters of the PKK group in north Iraq, the Arab League released a statement denouncing Turkey's actions. However, Qatar, a member of the organization, dissociated itself from this position, and instead proclaimed its support for Turkey.

==== Egypt ====
Both countries have been diplomatically involved in the Egyptian Crisis, where they mutually opposed Abdel Fattah el-Sisi's leadership. Following pro-Islamist candidate Mohammed Morsi's election victory in 2012, Turkey and Qatar supported his presidency, whereas the other five GCC nations were against his presidency. Morsi was ousted eventually in a coup d'état in 2013, provoking condemnation by Turkey. Qatar, on the other hand, while not directly criticizing the coup d'état, was the only GCC nation to denounce the excessive use of force against civilians.

In a 2016 interview with Al Jazeera, President Erdoğan strongly condemned Egypt's leader Abdel Fattah el-Sisi, saying that he has "killed thousands of his own people". Qatar and Turkey have both been pressed by the other GCC states to improve their ties with Egypt. Sisi declared on 14 June 2017, just 9 days after the start of the 2017 Qatari diplomatic crisis, that the group of countries boycotting Qatar should also target Turkey.

==== Syria ====
Qatar and Turkey share similar positions on the Syrian Civil War. The two formed a single bloc in the Civil War and supported the same rebel groups, including Tahrir al-Sham Islamist alliance, Ahrar al-Sham and Al-Nusra Front. One prominent opposition group funded by both Turkey and Qatar is the pro-Islamist Syrian National Council.

In 2018, spokeswoman of Qatar's Ministry of Foreign Affair said that Turkey's invasion of northern Syria aimed at ousting U.S.-backed Syrian Kurds from the enclave of Afrin was motivated by "legitimate concerns related to its national security and the security of its borders, in addition to protecting Syria's territorial integrity from the danger of secession." She also added that "Turkey, a NATO member, has always been a stabilizing factor in the region."

Qatar announced its support for the 2019 Turkish offensive into north-eastern Syria.

==== Libya ====
Turkey and Qatar both backed the pro-Islamist General National Congress in Libya. In January 2015, a Libyan army official accused Turkey and Qatar of funneling arms to Islamist political factions in Libya via Sudan.

==== Muslim Brotherhood factor ====
Both Qatar and Turkey overtly provides region-wide support for Muslim Brotherhood. Muslim Brotherhood's web of network in the region is something Qatar is using to project its influence internationally and compete with other regional players, while Turkey's ruling Justice and Development Party (otherwise known as AK Party) promotes a mix of democracy and Islam like that of the Brotherhood. In 2014, when Doha asked several Brotherhood exiles to leave Qatar due to the pressure from Saudi Arabia and other Gulf States, Turkey decided to host these exiles.

==== 2016 Turkish coup d'état attempt ====
When elements of the Turkish military attempted a military coup in July 2016, Qatar became the first country whose leader called President Erdoğan in a show of solidarity. Qatar also strongly denounced the coup, saying it breached Turkey's constitutional legitimacy. It was claimed by some media outlets that 150 Qatari elite special forces troops were deployed in Turkey shortly after the attempt to watch over the president.

==== 2017 Qatari diplomatic crisis ====
Turkey supported Qatar in its diplomatic confrontation with a Saudi and Emirati-led bloc of countries that severed ties with and imposed sanctions on Qatar on 5 June 2017. Turkish President Erdoğan criticized the list of demands released by the countries on 22 June, stating that they undermine Qatar's sovereignty. Because the boycotting nations highlight Qatar's support for the Muslim Brotherhood as one of the primary reasons for their sanctions, siding with Qatar was the most logical choice for Turkey's leadership, which also supports the Muslim Brotherhood.

On August 26, Turkey said that it had intercepted five hackers suspected of engineering the diplomatic crisis by inserting false and provocative statements on Qatar News Agency's website in late-May.

The Saudi-led blockade has led to closer cooperation and improved ties between Turkey and Iran, the other major power supporting Qatar's position.

The 2017–2021 Saudi-led blockade demonstrates how a small state can exercise influence through derivative power - the ability to enhance its own power by leveraging a close relationship with a stronger partner. Rather than being a passive recipient of Turkish support, Qatar developed the strategic partnership with Türkiye by deploying Turkish military troops, and promoting economic, and diplomatic relation. Turkey also helped Qatar by providing essential goods.

=== Diplomatic visits ===
High level visits have given a new momentum to the bilateral relations between the two countries. The visit of Qatari emir Hamad bin Khalifa Al Thani to Turkey on 25–26 December 2001 paved the way drawing the legal framework of economic and military cooperation through the signing of a number of protocols. These protocols included the Agreement on Prevention of Double Taxation, the Agreement on Reciprocal Promotion and Protection of Investments, and the Cooperation Agreement on Military Fields.

Prime Minister Recep Tayyip Erdoğan paid several official visits to Qatar. His first visit to Qatar was in 2005; this was followed by visits in 2008, 2010, 2011, and 2012.

Turkey's President Abdullah Gül, accompanied by the Minister of Finance, Minister of Energy, Minister of Public Work and Settlement, and a large group of businessmen, paid official visits to Qatar in February and April 2008. Prime Minister Recep Tayyip Erdoğan also visited Qatar in April 2008, and gave a key speech at the Doha Forum on Democracy, Development and Free Trade. He also held talks with Qatar's Emir, Prime Minister and Foreign Minister concerning economic agreements. The Foreign Minister and Prime Minister of Qatar paid return visits to Turkey in 2008, during which the 1st Turkish-Qatari Business Forum was held.

In 2008, Foreign Minister Ali Babacan visited Qatar to attend “The US-Islamic World Forum” as a keynote speaker organized by Qatari Ministry of Foreign Affairs and the US based Brookings Institution, as well as to have a bilateral meeting with his colleague Prime Minister and Foreign Minister Sheikh Hamad bin Jassim Al Thani.

In February 2016 Turkish President Erdoğan met with Qatari emir Tamim bin Hamad Al Thani in Istanbul to discuss military cooperation in Syria. One year later, in February 2017, President Erdoğan traveled to Doha on an official visit.

More than a month after the 2017 Qatari diplomatic crisis erupted on 5 June, President Erdoğan visited Qatar, along with Saudi Arabia and Kuwait in late July in a bid to allay the crisis. Qatari emir Tamim bin Hamad Al Thani visited Turkey to discuss the diplomatic crisis with President Erdoğan in September 2017. Both of them emphasized the importance of resolving the crisis by negotiations.

In July 2023, President Erdoğan visited Qatar to mark the 50th anniversary of diplomatic ties between the countries. Additionally, Erdoğan and Sheikh Tamim signed a joint declaration, pledging to further strengthen the bilateral relationship.

== Military relations ==
Qatar and Turkey signed an agreement in July 2002 which involved cooperation in military training and arms sales. A cooperation agreement involving both countries' defense industries was formalized in 2007. In March 2012, Qatar acquired its first-ever drones from Turkey in the form of ten mini-drones worth $2.5 million. This sale was part of a deal formed in May 2011 in which Turkey would sell $120 million worth of military equipment to Qatar in the span of a year. The two states signed a military cooperation agreement in July 2012, but details of the agreement were not disclosed.

In March 2015, both countries signed a military agreement which entailed mutual military deployment and the exchange of military training. However, the reasons behind this military agreement have not been officially explained, therefore raising suspicions in Turkey over whether Turkish military personnel stationed in Qatar would help train Syrian opposition groups. An event showcasing products from 67 Turkish defense companies was held in Doha in October 2015.

Qatar's government owns a 50% stake in BMC, a Turkish military vehicle manufacturer. It was reported in April 2017 that BMC received an order for 1,500 Amazon 4x4 armored vehicles from Qatar's military and police force. On 22 October 2025, Erdogan arrived in Doha, seeking to buy 24 used Eurofighters. This is an attempt of technology exchange of Turkish Kaan jet fighter to western jet fighters. In November 2026, Turkey and Qatar signed a mutual defense pact.

=== Turkish military presence in Qatar ===
On 2 December 2015, during a Turkish presidential visit to Qatar, Tamim bin Hamad and Tayyip Erdoğan jointly announced the planned creation of a Turkish military base in Qatar; a first for Turkey in the Persian Gulf. On December 16, 2016, Turkey's Ambassador to Qatar Ahmet Demirok declared that the establishment of the base was part of a broader defence agreement between the two countries to help them confront “common enemies.” According to Eyup Ersoy, a Gulf politics expert teaching at Bilkent University, the military base exemplifies Turkey and Qatar's willingness to overcome their strategic isolation in the region. The agreement also stipulates that Qatar may set up a military base in Turkey if it desires.

The agreement was first signed in 2014 and ratified by the Turkish Parliament in June 2015. The base was expected to be completed in two years. According to Ambassador Demirok, air and naval units, military trainers, special operations forces as well as 3,000 ground troops will be stationed at the base.

Two days after a number of countries led by Saudi Arabia and the United Arab Emirates severed ties with Qatar on 5 June 2017, Turkey's leading party proposed the fast-tracking of Turkish troop deployment in Qatar, and also proposed joint training programmes between the two countries' militaries. On 18 June, an armed Turkish contingent consisting of five military vehicles and twenty-three military personnel were sent to Qatar. They supplemented the existing 88-strong Turkish force stationed there. Turkish soldiers currently have their base of operations at an abandoned British base located 15 miles away from Doha.

A list of demands drafted by the blockading countries and handed to Qatar on 22 June included a demand that Turkey withdraws its troops from the country. Shortly after the list was made public, Turkish President Erdoğan rejected the removal of Turkish troops from Qatari soil, claiming that the list of demands violated international law. On 26 June, the foreign minister of Bahrain, one of Qatar's maritime neighbors who severed ties with it, blamed Qatar for "military escalations" by its hosting of Turkish troops. At the end of the month, Turkey sent more troops to Qatar, to participate in joint military drills. Additional Turkish troops were stationed in Qatar by 11 July, and more arrived on 17 July, bolstering the Turkish military presence in the country to about 150.

Currently, there are more than 3,000 Turkish soldiers in Qatar to help the Qatari citizens. The number of Turkish troops in Qatar could rise to 5,000 in the future. Turkey's ambassador to Qatar Fikret Özer confirmed in February 2018 that Turkish air and naval troops will eventually be stationed in Qatar after the necessary infrastructure is built, however, no date has been given. At the Doha International Maritime Defence Exhibition and Conference (DIMDEX) held in March 2018, both countries signed an agreement that would allow Turkey to construct a naval base in the north of Qatar which would include a training facility.

In 2022, it was announced that Turkey would be sending hundreds of cops to Qatar during FIFA 2022.

== Economic relations ==
Economic relations witnessed substantial development in the 21st century. In the 2000, the total trade volume between the two countries was $38 million. By 2018, this number had increased to $1.43 billion.

On 11 June 2008, Qatar Investment Authority and Turkey Investment Support and Promotion Agency signed a Memorandum of Understanding (MoU) and it opened a comprehensive cooperation between two countries.

Qatar mainly imports from Turkey electrical and electronic equipment, furniture, construction components, petroleum and mineral oils, milk and dairy products. Raw aluminum, mineral fuels (LNG), and plastic products are among the products mostly imported by Turkey from Qatar. From 2015 to 2018, Qatar's import of Turkish products increased by 159%, whereas Turkey's import of Qatari products decreased by 7%.

=== Natural gas ===
The Qatar-Turkey pipeline was proposed by Qatar in 2009 in order to connect the two region's natural gas reserves. In fact, liquefied natural gas (LNG) is one of Qatar's most important export products to Turkey.

Turkey reached an agreement with Qatar to purchase liquefied natural gas over a prolonged period in December 2015. It was opined by analysts that, owing to diplomatic hostilities between Turkey and Russia, the deal was made by Turkey with the intent of replacing Russia with Qatar as its major LNG supplier.

=== Foreign investments ===
In terms of foreign direct investments, between 2003 and 2015, Turkey ranked as Qatar's 23rd largest investor, with 3 companies making investments worth $239 million. Qatar's outward investments during this same period reflected Turkey as the 17th most popular destination for Qatari foreign investments. More than $2.1 billion was invested in Turkey by two Qatari companies.

In 2016, Qatar had the second-highest value of investments made in Turkey that year by an Asian country after Azerbaijan, investing a total of $375 million.

According to statements made by Mohammed bin Ahmed bin Towar Al Kuwari, vice-chairman of the Qatar Chamber, in May 2017, there were 205 Turkish companies operating out of Qatar; 186 of these were joint ventures between Turks and Qataris. These companies are mainly based in the contracting, engineering and construction industries. The value of investments made by the joint ventures amount to QR42 million, whereas the fully-Turkish companies have invested more than QR62 million. He stated that Qatar's foreign direct investments in Turkey over $20 billion, which would rank it second for foreign investment in Turkey. In late 2017, it was reported that Qatar agreed to invest another $19 billion in 2018, with the Qatar Investment Authority pledging $15 billion of investments and Q Invest accounting for the remaining $4 billion.

In September 2018, the Emir of Qatar Sheikh Tamim bin Hamad Al Thani gave a Boeing 747-8 worth some $400 million to the Turkish President Recep Tayyip Erdoğan. Following that, Sheikh Tamim made an investment of $15 billion in the Turkish economy.

=== Economic relations during the 2017 Qatari diplomatic crisis ===
Turkey supported Qatar economically during the 2017 Qatari diplomatic crisis, when, on 5 June, several of Qatar's neighbors sealed off their air, land and sea borders to Qatar-flagged vessels and vessels arriving to and from Qatar. From 5 June to 25 June, Turkey's exports to Qatar tripled in value. Turkey mainly helped Qatar with food supplies, particularly dairy, poultry and fruit products. At one point, Turkey was exporting 200,000 tonnes of vegetables to Qatar daily, and was also helping Qatar meet the majority of its dairy supply.

In an effort to increase bilateral trade volume, fifteen separate trade and cooperation agreements were signed between the Turkish and Qatari governments in August 2017. It was also announced in August 2017 that a Qatar-Turkey Business Council would be established in October of that year.

On 6 September, a trade line route between Qatar and Turkey running through Iran was inaugurated, shortening the travel time of goods traded to under 2 days. Prior to the launch of this new trade route, transportation by land took 14 days, while transportation by sea took an additional 11 days. The final stop of the new route is from the Iranian Bushehr Port to Ar Ru'ays Port in Qatar, which can be traveled in under ten hours. In addition to this new trade route, a shipping service between Turkey's Port of Mersin and Qatar's Hamad Port was also announced. A report released the same month indicated that Turkey's exports to Qatar had increased by 84% since the onset of the Qatari diplomatic crisis on 5 June. Livestock and aquatic products accounted for the largest portion of exports.

Turkey's government has capitalized on the crisis by directing Turkish suppliers to raise their prices. Furthermore, Ankara has pressed Qatar into granting preferential selection for Turkish companies as well as formalizing more long-term agreements.

=== 2018 Turkish currency and debt crisis ===
During the 2018 Turkish currency and debt crisis, in mid-August Qatar pledged $15 billion worth of direct investments into Turkey. A few days after announcing this, Qatar's Central Bank signed an agreement with the Turkish Central Bank for a $3 billion currency swap. Officials involved with the deal have stated it will drastically improve bilateral trade. Some analysts have cited Qatar's financial assistance to Turkey as a good example of the consistent advancement of bilateral relations in recent years. Another view is that Qatar is attempting to repay Turkey for its loyalty and military assistance during the Qatar diplomatic crisis.

== Cultural relations ==
On 4 December 2013, Erdoğan inaugurated the new headquarters of the country's embassy in Doha and announced the establishment of a Turkish cultural center in Qatar. The construction of a 'Turkish village' in Doha was launched in September 2014 in the midst of a visit by President Erdoğan. The village is set to occupy approximately 400,000 sq meters and will feature traditional Ottoman markets, hotels and other service facilities.

The Qatar–Turkey 2015 Year of Culture was implemented by the Qatari government in January as an initiative to improve cultural cooperation between the two countries. As a result of this cultural initiative, in December 2015 the Yunus Emre Institute opened a center in Doha. Aside from coordinating cultural activities with the Turkish embassy in Doha, the center will also host language classes, exhibitions and conferences.

== Educational and medical relations ==
The first Turkish school to operate in Qatar, Türk Okulu, was inaugurated in October 2016. It was reported that the school would have a student capacity of 300 with a faculty count of 17 teachers. In February 2017, during a visit by President Erdoğan, the second school in Doha to follow a Turkish curriculum opened its doors. Constructed at a cost of roughly $5.5 million and able to accommodate 250 students, the school is directed by the Turkish embassy in Doha.

After an agreement was reached between the two countries for Turkey to establish a hospital to serve the needs of Qatar's population, the Turkish Hospital in Qatar opened its doors in January 2017 with a 100-bed capacity.

== Foreign aid ==
Following the 2023 Turkey–Syria earthquake, Qatar pledged to provide 10,000 mobile homes used in the 2022 FIFA World Cup to the earthquake zones. The first shipment took place in February. On 24 June 2023, Qatar completed the delivery.

== See also ==
- Foreign relations of Qatar
- Foreign relations of Turkey
- Turks in Qatar
