= Treaty of Jeddah (1974) =

1974 border treaty between UAE and Saudi Arabia

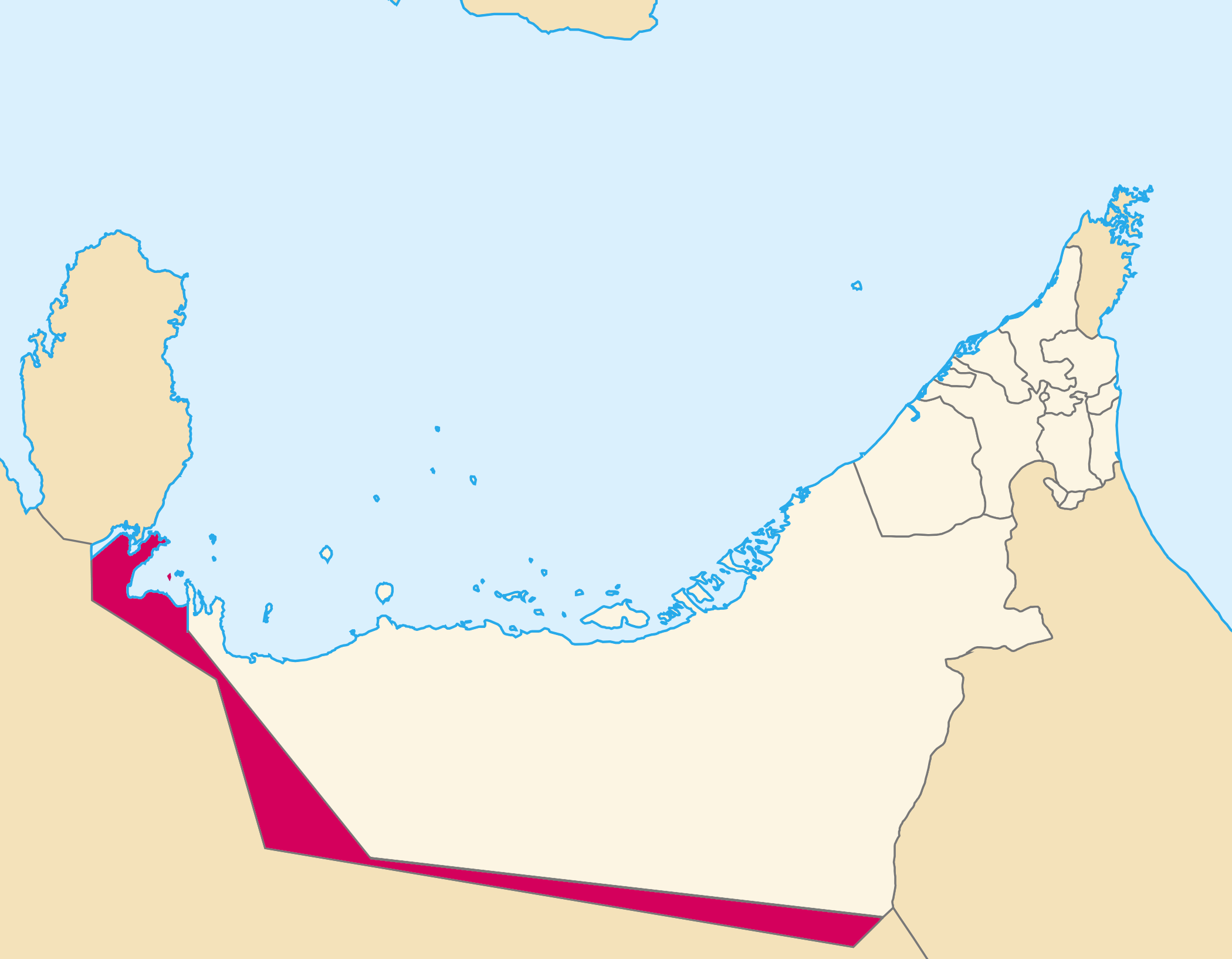
- Map of the United Arab Emirates showing the approximate areas ceded by the UAE to Saudi Arabia in the treaty of Jeddah.
- Signed: August 21, 1974
- Signatories: Saudi Arabia; United Arab Emirates

The 1974 Treaty of Jeddah was a treaty between Saudi Arabia and United Arab Emirates, signed in 21 August 1974 between King Faisal of Saudi Arabia and President of the United Arab Emirates Sheikh Zayed bin Sultan Al Nahyan. The treaty intended to resolve the Saudi Arabia – United Arab Emirates border dispute (including the Buraimi Dispute). Saudi Arabia ratified the treaty in 1993, but the UAE had not yet ratified it as of 2025. The legal validity of the treaty has been questioned, since Qatar was not included in the negotiations, and the proposed settlement affects the Qatari border. However, Qatar had already reached a separate agreement on its border with Saudi Arabia in December 1965.

The United Arab Emirates government has disputed the treaty since 1975 due to discrepancies between the oral agreement before the treaty’s signing and the final text of the treaty itself. The treaty has been argued to be in favor of the Saudi government owing to the weakened Abu Dhabi position after the withdrawal of Britain, the US support to the Arabian American Oil Company, and the threat of Saudi military intervention in Abu Dhabi at that time. The UAE has attempted to bring Saudi Arabia back to the negotiating table ever since.

== History ==
After the declaration of independence of the United Arab Emirates in 1971, Saudi Arabia withheld the recognition of the country and Sheikh Zayed bin Sultan Al Nahyan as a President on the basis of territorial disputes with the Emirate of Abu Dhabi and continued to deal with the emirates as individual emirates bypassing the federal union. In 1974, King Faisal was asked by Sheikh Zayed that the UAE was in dire need of cooperation from Saudi Arabia in its recognition of the country and was asked to open the negotiations over the border issue. King Faisal used the tactic of non-recognition as leverage against the Emirate of Abu Dhabi to make it reach a settlement quickly. King Faisal was already associated with the issue before 1974 as the minister of foreign affairs during the reign of his father King Abdulaziz. He has witnessed the failure of many meetings at which British officials sometimes represented Abu Dhabi. He felt the handling of the Buraimi dispute in which Saudi troops were defeated and forcibly removed was a great insult to the Kingdom and a blow to be avenged. King Faisal told the UAE delegation which visited him in Taif in July 1972 that Saudi Arabia had been humiliated in Buraimi and that it would have to retrieve its rights, vowing that it would not abandon property inherited from fathers and grandfathers. Sheikh Zayed was more eager for a settlement but Saudi Arabia's demand was unrealistic as it claimed the annexation of extensive lands in the Emirate of Abu Dhabi some of which contained a number of oil fields.

On 21 August 1974, an agreement was settled between Sheikh Zayed and King Faisal on the demarcation of the frontiers between the Emirate of Abu Dhabi and Saudi Arabia. Saudi Arabia immediately declared recognition of the United Arab Emirates, sent its ambassador, and promoted its liaison office in Dubai into a consulate. The step strengthened the United Arab Emirate's position as a union and consolidated Sheikh Zayed's position as President.

The United Arab Emirates government opened the issue publicly in 2004 after Sheikh Zayed's death and after the election of Sheikh Khalifa bin Zayed Al Nahyan as President of the Emirates. The issue was opened by Sheikh Khalifa during his first state visit abroad to Riyadh as the UAE's President. It became public knowledge that the dispute had not ended in 1974 and that Abu Dhabi has never been satisfied with the treaty, seeking modifications of certain articles in the treaty.

== Content ==
Important points of the treaty articles include:

- Geographical coordinates of the Saudi-Emirati border as set out in the treaty.
- All hydrocarbons in the Shaybah-Zarrarah field shall be considered as belonging to Saudi Arabia and the United Arab Emirates undertakes not to explore or drill any part of that field lying to the north of Saudi's border. Saudi Arabia may engage in drilling of that field north of its border with prior agreement with the United Arab Emirates.
- Saudi Arabia gets sovereignty over Huwaysat Island in the Arabian Gulf.
- The United Arab Emirates to allow the construction of general installations by Saudi Arabia on the islands of AI-Qaffay and Makasib.
- Both parties shall as soon as possible delimit the offshore boundaries between the territory of Saudi Arabia and the territory of the United Arab Emirates.

== Disputed articles ==
The United Arab Emirates government has disputed the treaty since 1975 due to discrepancies between the oral agreement before the treaty’s signing and the final text of the treaty itself. According to the United Arab Emirates, the government did not notice this discrepancy until 1975 as a result of the absence of lawyers, technicians, and geographers on its negotiation team. The treaty has been argued to be in favor of the Saudi government owing to the weakened Abu Dhabi position after the withdrawal of Britain, the US support to the Arabian American Oil Company, and the threat of Saudi military intervention in Abu Dhabi at that time. Overall, the UAE has called that parts of the treaty cannot be implemented and calls for its desire for the amendment of some parts of the agreement. Author Richard Schofield has described the treaty as "the most bizarre international boundary agreement ever signed between two states." as it is unclear what the UAE actually gained from the treaty.

=== Article 3 & 4 (Shaybah – Zararah oil field) ===
Sheikh Zayed, Sultan Qaboos, and the British government were all under the impression that the revenues from Shaybah oil field would be shared between the two countries with the usual practice of unitizing the exploration of the resource according to the percentage of the resource lying in the boundary of the other country; however, article 3 of the treaty did not indicate any oil-sharing between the two countries. Sheikh Zayed was under the impression through an oral agreement that revenues of the oil field would be received per percentage of the oil field laying within UAE's boundary.
