= Turks in Kuwait =

Total population
- Foreign Turkish people living in Kuwait: 3,262

Regions with significant populations
- Kuwait City

Languages
- Turkish; Arabic

Religion
- Islam

Turks in Kuwait (Turkish: Kuveyt Türkleri) are Kuwaiti people of Turkish ancestry and foreign Turkish people who live in Kuwait. By Turkish roots, this could mean roots linking back to Turkey, the island of Cyprus or the communities of the Turkish diaspora.

== Business ==
There are Turkish teachers, doctors, engineers and businessmen in Kuwait.

== Notable Turks in Kuwait ==
- Dina Al-Sabah (mother is half-Syrian, half Turkish)

== See also ==
- Kuwait–Turkey relations
- Basra Province, Ottoman Empire
- Turkish diaspora
- Immigration to Kuwait

== Bibliography ==
- Council of Europe (2007), Parliamentary Assembly: Working Papers 2007 Ordinary Session 22–26 January 2007, Council of Europe, ISBN 92-871-6191-7.
- Organisation for Economic Co-operation and Development (2005), Migration, Remittances and Development, OECD Publishing, ISBN 92-64-01388-1.
