= Buraimi dispute =

Conflict between Saudi Arabia and the Trucial Emirates

Invasion of Hamasa and Buraimi
Date	28 January 1952 – 25 October 1955
Location	Al-Buraimi
Result	Trucial Oman Levies victory: Surrender of Saudi forces; Ceasefire agreement with Bedouin tribes
Territorial changes	Saudi Arabia withdraws and Oman regains control of Na'im and Al Bu Shamis, Buraimi and Hamasah; Emirate of Abu Dhabi consolidates control of Al Ain; Start of the Saudi Arabia – United Arab Emirates border dispute

Belligerents
Saudi Arabia; Supported by: Na'im tribe; Al Bu Shamis tribe; Al bu Kharaiban tribe	Trucial Emirates: Emirate of Abu Dhabi; (United Kingdom) British Empire; Aden Protectorate; Supported by: Sultanate of Muscat and Oman

Commanders and leaders
(Saudi Arabia) Turki bin Abdullah Al Otaishan (Saudi Arabia) Major Abdullah bin Nami (WIA); Supported by: Sheikh Rashid bin Hamad Al Shamsi; Sheikh Saqr bin Sultan Al Nuaimi	(United Kingdom) Major Otto Thwaites † (in 1952) (Emirate of Abu Dhabi) Zayed bin Sultan Al Nahyan (in 1955); Supported by: (Muscat and Oman) Said bin Taimur

Strength
80 Saudi Arabian guards 200 Bedouins	100 Trucial Oman Levies; 300 Aden Protectorate Levies; 7 armoured cars 14 Land Rovers; 4 Lancaster bombers

Casualties and losses
Unknown?	Unknown?

The Buraimi dispute, also known as the Buraimi war (Arabic: حرب البريمي), was a series of covert attempts by Saudi Arabia to influence the loyalties of tribes and communities in and around the oil-rich Buraimi oasis in the 1940s and 1950s, which culminated in an armed conflict between forces and tribes loyal to Saudi Arabia, on one side, and Oman and the Trucial States (today the United Arab Emirates, or UAE), on the other, which broke out as the result of a territorial dispute over the town of Al Buraimi in Oman, and parts of what is now the city of Al Ain in the Eastern Region of the Emirate of Abu Dhabi. It amounted to an attempted Saudi invasion of the Buraimi Oasis. Its roots lay in the partitioning of tribal areas and communities which took place in the Trucial States when oil companies were seeking concessions to explore the interior.

== Background ==
The dispute arose from Saudi Arabia's longstanding claim, made in 1949, of sovereignty over a large part of Abu Dhabi territory where oil was suspected to be present and an area in a 20-mile circle around the centre of the Buraimi Oasis. The claim arose after a geological party from the Arabian American Oil Company (Aramco) crossed the 'Riyadh line'. This was a border line negotiated in 1935 by the British on behalf of Oman and Abu Dhabi with Saudi Arabia, which the latter had rejected. The Aramco party was accompanied by Saudi guards and was met by Patrick Stobart, then the British political officer for the Trucial States. Stobart was briefly detained by the Saudis, who disarmed his guards. The incident, presented as actively supported by the CIA in Allen Dulles' memoirs, led the British to formally protest to the king of Saudi Arabia, King Abdulaziz Al Saud. The Saudis responded by extending their territorial claim to include the right to negotiate with the Sheikhs of the entire Buraimi/Al Ain Oasis and areas of the southern and western part of Abu Dhabi.

The Saudis relied on historical precedent (the oasis had been under Wahhabi influence on a number of occasions in the period between 1800–1869) for their claims, which were countered by arguments from Abu Dhabi and Muscat based on more recent events. The argument led to the 1950 'London Agreement' whereby all exploration and troop movements would cease in the area until the issue of sovereignty was resolved. Despite ongoing negotiations, the Saudis attempted to take back the oasis.

== Invasion of Hamasa ==
A conference was held in Dammam on 28 January 1952, attended by the Saudi Minister of Foreign Affairs, the Rulers of Abu Dhabi and Qatar and the British Political Resident, Bernard Burrows. Following long deliberation, the conference was postponed until February, but failed to reach agreement.

On 31 August 1952, a group of some 80 Saudi Arabian guards, 40 of whom were armed, led by the Saudi Emir of Ras Tanura, Turki bin Abdullah Al Otaishan, crossed Abu Dhabi territory and occupied Hamasa, one of three Omani villages in the oasis, claiming it as part of the Eastern Province of Saudi Arabia. They were assisted in this by Sheikh Rashid bin Hamad of the Al Bu Shamis branch of the Na'im tribe, much to the disgust of the Sultan of Oman. The Al Bu Kharaiban Sheikh of the Na'im was also pulled into the dispute, despite trying to remain removed from it initially. Al Otaishan was invited into the village by Sheikh Rashid and proceeded to proclaim himself governor, and announced that he had come at the call of the indigenous population to "protect them." Al Otaishan and his men set about distributing gifts of clothes, money and other supplies and held a banquet - a popular move in the impoverished area. In all, he collected some 95 statements of support through his efforts.

The Sulṭan of Muscat and Imam of Oman (in a rare collaboration) gathered their forces to expel the Saudis but were persuaded by the British Government to exercise restraint pending attempts to settle the dispute by arbitration. The Sultan of Muscat, Said bin Taimur, and the Imam both raised some 6,000-8,000 tribal forces and assembled at Sohar, preparing to march on Buraimi before being appealed to by Britain to stand down. A Standstill Agreement was reached in October 1952. A British military build-up took place, with 100 Trucial Oman Levies (TOL, later known as the Trucial Oman Scouts), a British-backed force based in Sharjah, 300 Aden Protectorate Levies, 7 armoured cars and 14 Land Rovers supported by 4 Lancaster bombers (two based at the British airbase in Sharjah and two at Habbaniyah), 3 Ansons in Bahrain and a section of Meteor fighters based in Sharjah. These were supported by two frigates. These forces were used to blockade the Saudi contingent, with attempts to reinforce them turning back truck convoys and camel trains from Saudi Arabia. The TOL was instructed to disarm any Saudi attempting to run the blockade and return them to Saudi Arabia.

=== Mutiny ===
The Levies from Aden turned out to be problematic: they had been recruited in a hurry as the TOL was not a large enough force to manage the blockade of Buraimi effectively, and they arrived at the TOL base in Sharjah as a poorly trained force with flawed leadership. Their officer was replaced by Major Otto Thwaites, who had previously trained a detachment from Aden successfully. Trouble soon broke out and it was discovered the men were selling ammunition to local tribesmen and some were in contact with the Saudis. Thwaites returned a number of men to Sharjah, but there was more trouble over the killing of a civilian in an attempt to break the blockade. A mutiny broke out when Thwaites arrested the men concerned, with a number of the Aden Levies firing their guns as they pressed for the release of the men. The Commander of the Levies ordered the men to return to their posts and the ringleaders of the mutiny be sent to Sharjah, but a further incident occurred when Thwaites attempted to send an NCO back to Sharjah. The man refused to go and, together with two others, opened fire on Thwaites, killing him as well as another British officer and a Jordanian adjutant. Having alienated local sentiment, the Aden Levies were judged beyond repair and returned to Aden, leaving behind a considerable vacuum which was eventually filled by a company from the British air base.

=== Arbitration ===
Following the Standstill Agreement on 30 July 1954, it was agreed to refer the dispute to an international arbitration tribunal., which the Director of Central Intelligence Allen Dulles unsuccessfully tried to subvert. The Arbitration Agreement allowed for one officer and fifteen men from both the Saudi force and the Trucial Oman Levies to be stationed within the oasis. The Saudi forces were supplied by air as any other route was impractical for them. The arbitration was to take place in Geneva.

Meanwhile, Saudi Arabia embarked on a campaign of bribery to obtain declarations of tribal loyalty on which its case was to be based. This campaign even extended to Sheikh Zayed bin Sultan Al Nahyan, brother of Sheikh Shakhbut, the Ruler of Abu Dhabi and at that time the wali of Al Ain. Zayed was approached by the Saudis, first with an offer of 50% of any oil revenues from the area, then a new car and 40,000 Rupees. A third approach offered Zayed 400 million Rupees and finally, he was informed that the Saudi representative, Abdullah Al Qurayshi, wished to present him with three pistols.

In 1955 arbitration proceedings began in Geneva only to collapse when the British arbitrator, Sir Reader Bullard, objected to Saudi Arabian attempts to influence the tribunal and withdrew – one of the two judges to resign, the other being the Belgian President.

Given these breaches of the agreement, the British government decided to unilaterally abrogate the Standstill Agreement and take the oasis on 25 October 1955.

=== Invasion of Buraimi ===
The British planned to use overwhelming force to prevent bloodshed, sending in 220 men, two squadrons of the Trucial Oman Levies, against the small Saudi force. However, the operation was complicated by the presence of large numbers of Bedouin around the oasis, including the Bani Kaab from Mahdah under Sheikh Obaid bin Juma, who were subjects of Muscat but supported Shaikh Rashid bin Hamad of the Al Bu Shamis, themselves a notable force. The Na'im were also, under Sheikh Saqr Al Nuaimi, an unknown quantity. The operation was intended to quickly displace the Saudi force and fly them out of the area.

On 25 October, the Trucial Oman Levies quickly took the oasis and captured all fifteen of the Saudi contingent under the Saudi Emir Bin Nami, who was shot and lightly wounded when attempting to resist arrest and save a chest containing some 170,000 Rupees. The Saudi force was flown out on an RAF Valetta, which took them to Sharjah and then on to Saudi Arabia by sea. Most of the fighting took place after the surrender of the Saudis, with the Al Bu Shamis and Bani Kaab Bedouin force of some 200 men putting up a spirited resistance to the Levies. A Lincoln bomber was called in, but couldn't use its machine guns as the area was populated by civilians.

== Ceasefire ==
Sheikh Zayed and his brother, Sheikh Hazza, were present during the action and agreed to help the British open negotiation with the Bedouin Sheikhs, although they were cautious as they had no involvement in what was an Omani problem – the tribes were dependents of Muscat. However, Zayed had one of his most trusted advisors working behind the scenes to try and stop the Kaabis and Shamsis firing at the Levies.

The Levies were planning a night attack on the Bedouin positions, when at 11pm, Sheikh Saqr and Sheikh Rashid arrived at a small encampment established by Edward Henderson, an oil company executive known to the Sheikhs who had been seconded to the Levies. A cease-fire was negotiated and the two Sheikhs and their families and closest followers were sent by air to Bahrain.

Sheikh Saqr left behind him a treasure trove, some ten brass-bound chests filled with silver coins amounting to some 175,000 Rupees.

== Aftermath ==
Following the conflict, the British decided to split the territory of Buraimi Oasis, ceding the areas under the Na'im and Al Bu Shamis, Buraimi and Hamasah, to Oman and the territory under Sheikh Zayed, including the village of Al Ain and its oases, to Abu Dhabi.

After the declaration of independence of the United Arab Emirates in 1971, Saudi Arabia withheld recognition of the new nation and Sheikh Zayed bin Sultan Al Nahyan as its president on the basis of territorial disputes with the Emirate of Abu Dhabi and continued to deal with the emirates as individual emirates bypassing the federal union. In 1972, an approach was made to King Faisal regarding recognition of the Emirates and resolution of the border issue. Faisal maintained his territorial claims when a UAE delegation visited him in Taif in July 1972, claiming title to extensive tracts in the Emirate of Abu Dhabi, which contained a number of oil fields. The dispute was eventually settled in 1974 by the Treaty of Jeddah, between Sheikh Zayed (then President of the UAE) and Faisal and Saudi Arabia formally recognised the United Arab Emirates. However, the treaty remains disputed.

== In popular culture ==
The first episode of the seventh season of The Goon Show was called "The Nasty Affair at the Buraimi Oasis". The Goon Show used a piece of contemporary news as a framing theme of the story, including the actual BBC News broadcast clip opening of said event; even though it diverged into a satirical take on the situation from then on.

== See also ==
- List of wars involving Saudi Arabia
- Oman–United Arab Emirates border
- Saudi Arabia–United Arab Emirates border
