= Education in Oman =

Education in Oman is provided free of charge up to end of secondary education, though attendance is not mandatory at any level. In 1970 there were only three formal schools with 900 students in the whole state. Oman's national educational programme expanded rapidly during the 1970s and the 1980s, with the Kingdom of Saudi Arabia sending teachers on its own expense during that time period. In 2006–2007 about 560,000 students attended 1053 public schools. The number of students in private schools is about 65,000. There are also extensive programmes to combat adult illiteracy. Sultan Qaboos University, the only national university near Muscat, was founded in 1986, and in 2006 it had 13,500 students. The Human Development Report found the literacy rate to be 93.0% in adults, up from 54.7% in 1990. For the same period, the youth literacy rate increased from 85.6 to 97.3%. Public expenditure on education was reported to be 4.6% of GDP and 26.1% of total government spending.

== Pre-school education ==
Pre school education is provided to children less than 10 years old. It is offered by the private sector and some public organisations. Supervision is the responsibility of the Ministry of Education and the Ministry of Social Affairs. Nursery enrolment is very limited and estimated to be only 1%. Kindergarten is available mostly in large cities and enrolment is estimated to be 15%.

Attendance usually extends from 8:00 a.m. to 12:30 pm, the teacher being free to organise this period as they deem appropriate between school learning and artistic and leisure activities.

The Ministry of Education is in the process of finalising the advanced curriculum for the kindergarten level, based on self-learning as a method and centred on the Omani child and on his/her environment, cultural heritage and civilisation.

== Basic education ==
In 1997, the ministry began development work on a Basic Education programme to gradually replace the three level General Education system. The aim of the reform is to create a unified system covering the first ten years of schooling. Basic Education is organised into two cycles: the first cycle covers grades 1 to 4 and the second cycle covers grades 5 to 10. These two cycle are followed by two years of post-Basic Education system (secondary education). The first schools started to introduce the new system in the academic year 1998/1999.

== Secondary education ==
Lasts for three years or you can graduate at any time.

Oman retains a number of grammar schools of international renown and a majority of which are private educational establishments offering Classics beyond Latin and Greek to include the ancient literary studies of Sanskrit, Hebrew and Arabic. Notable ones include Al Sahwa Schools, The American International School Muscat The American International School of Muscat, Pakistan School Muscat, Pakistan School Salalah, Indian School Muscat, American British Academy, the British School – Muscat British School Muscat, the Indian School Al Ghubra, the Indian School Al Wadi Al Kabir International, the Indian School Al Wadi Al Kabir and The Sultan's School.

== Higher education ==
The Omani higher education system is relatively young, as the first public university in Oman, Sultan Qaboos University, was founded in 1986. Prior to the establishment of SQU, the government sent some students to pursue higher education studies in neighbouring Arab countries like UAE, Kuwait, Jordan and Egypt. Also some students were awarded scholarships to study in the UK and America.

SQU is self-administered and has nine colleges. The colleges of Arts and Social Sciences, Commerce and Economics, Education, Law, and Nursing offer bachelor's and some master's degrees. Starting from September 2008, SQU began introducing PhD studies in its colleges of Agriculture and Marine Sciences, Medicine and Health Sciences, Engineering, and Science. A bachelor's degree takes about five years, as the first is spent studying English, and the second studying relevant science subjects; the last three years are dedicated to core degree units. A medicine degree takes seven years. The public university is normally visited by Omanis only. Expatriates go – as a general rule – to private universities or study abroad.

Oman's Ministry of Higher Education administers the six Colleges of Applied Sciences. These were formerly colleges of education, but in 2005 Royal Decree No. 62/2007 was issued to transform them to better cater to the current labour market in fields such as international business administration, communication, design, engineering, and IT. They are located in Ibri, Nizwa, Salalah, Sohar, Sur, and Rustaq. The College of Applied Sciences in Rustaq is the only one that still offers an education degree. The Ministry also has a department that sanctions private colleges and universities.

Oman Tourism College (OTC) was established in 2001 by the Government of Oman including groups such as the Ministry of Commerce and Industry and the Ministry of Tourism.

Oman's Ministry of Manpower operates the Higher College of Technology in Muscat and six colleges of technology in Al-Mussana, Ibra, Ibri, Nizwa, Salalah, and Shinas. The Ministry of Health runs a number of health institutes to prepare assisting medical staff like nurses, paramedics and pharmacists. The Ministry of Awqaf and Religious Affairs sanctions the College of Sharia Sciences. The Central Bank of Oman sanctions the College of Banking and Financial Studies.

As the number of students finishing secondary school goes up each year (44,000 were expected to finish in 2008), SQU and other public colleges have become unable to cope with the demand. Since private colleges were very limited in the mid nineties, more and more students sought higher education in countries like the UAE, Jordan and Egypt. The government became aware of the trend and decided to encourage the private sector in Oman to form universities and colleges. The first private college was established in 1994. Since this date, a number of private colleges and universities have been started in Oman. Most of them focus on popular studies such as business administration and computer sciences. They are usually affiliated with European, Australian or American institutions. The language of instruction is mainly English. A’Sharqiya University, in Ibra, opened its doors in the fall of 2010.

In the year 2003, Oman's Ministry of Higher Education approved the merger of five private run colleges to form the Muscat University. However, the plan to merge Fire Safety Engineering College, Majan College, Modern College of Business & Science (MCBS), Middle East College and Mazoon College for Management and Applied Sciences failed (source: Oman Observer 18 July 2005). Currently, there is some talk that the plan to form Muscat University may be revived.

As part of the eOman initiative, applications for 2006/2007 higher education (public and private) places have been merged under one unified online system called the HEAC (Higher Education Admissions Center). Each higher education institute publishes the minimum entry requirement for each of its degrees and the student selects his or her choices in order of preference. When the Ministry of Education publishes secondary school results in mid July, these results are fed automatically into the system and offers are made in early August. Before this system, the students had to submit their papers to the different institutes by themselves after the publication of results. The process was very inconvenient for the students and the admission departments as there was very little time and students had to travel repeatedly.
