= List of universities and colleges in Oman =

This is the list of universities, colleges and institutes in Oman.

== By province ==
University/College	Foundation	City	Website
Muscat Governorate
Sultan Qaboos University	1982	Seeb	https://www.squ.edu.om/
College of Banking and Financial Studies	1983	Bawshar	https://cbfs.edu.om/
University of Technology and Applied Sciences (Muscat)	1984	Bawsher	https://www.utas.edu.om/muscat/
Majan University College	1995	Ruwi	https://majancollege.edu.om/
International College of Engineering and Management	1995	Seeb	https://www.icem.edu.om/
National University of Science and Technology (College of Engineering)	1996	Seeb	https://nu.edu.om/engineering/
Muscat College	1996	Bawshar	https://muscatcollege.edu.om/
Modern College of Business & Science	1996	Bawshar	https://www.mcbs.edu.om/
Military Technological College	1997	Seeb	https://www.mtc.edu.om/
Mazoon College	1999	Seeb	https://mazcol.edu.om/
Middle East College	2000	Seeb	https://mec.edu.om/
Oman Tourism College	2001	Seeb	https://www.otc.edu.om/
German University of Technology	2003	Seeb	https://www.gutech.edu.om/
National University of Science and Technology (College of Pharmacy)	2003	Bawshar	https://nu.edu.om/pharmacy
Gulf College	2003	Seeb	https://gulfcollege.edu.om/
Oman College of Management and Technology	2004	Seeb	https://ocmt.odoo.com
Scientific College of Design	2004	Seeb	https://scd.edu.om/
Arab Open University	2008	Seeb	https://www.aou.edu.om/
Global College of Engineering and Technology	2014	Bawshar	https://gcet.edu.om/
Muscat University	2016	Bawshar	https://muscatuniversity.edu.om/
Al Batinah North Governorate
Sohar University	2001	Sohar	https://www.su.edu.om/
National University of Science and Technology (College of Medicine and Health Sciences)	2001	Sohar	https://nu.edu.om/medicine/
University of Technology and Applied Sciences (Shinas)	2005	Shinas	https://www.shct.edu.om/
National University of Science and Technology (International Maritime College Oman)	2005	Sohar	https://imco.edu.om/
University of Technology and Applied Sciences (Sohar)	1995	Sohar	https://www.utas.edu.om/en-us/Branches/Suhar
Ad Dakhiliyah Governorate
University of Technology and Applied Sciences (Nizwa)	1995	Nizwa	https://www.utas.edu.om/nizwa/
University of Nizwa	2004	Nizwa	https://www.unizwa.edu.om/
Al Batinah South Governorate
University of Technology and Applied Sciences (Mussanah)	2001	Mussanah	https://www.utas.edu.om/mussanah/
University of Technology and Applied Sciences (Rustaq)	2008	Rustaq	https://www.utas.edu.om/rustaq/
Dhofar Governorate
University of Technology and Applied Sciences (Salalah)	2001	Salalah	https://www.utas.edu.om/salalah
Dhofar University	2004	Salalah	https://www.du.edu.om/
Ash Sharqiyah South Governorate
Sur University College	2001	Sur	https://www.suc.edu.om/
University of Technology and Applied Sciences (Sur)	2005	Sur	https://www.utas.edu.om/sur/
Ash Sharqiyah North Governorate
University of Technology and Applied Sciences (Ibra)	2001	Ibra	https://www.utas.edu.om/ibra/
A’Sharqiyah University	2009	Ibra	https://www.asu.edu.om/
Al Dhahirah Governorate
University of Technology and Applied Sciences (Ibri)	2007	Ibri	https://www.utas.edu.om/ibri/
Al Buraimi Governorate
Al Buraimi University College	2003	Al-Buraimi	https://buc.edu.om/
University of Buraimi	2010	Al-Buraimi	https://www.uob.edu.om/
Musandam Governorate
University of Technology and Applied Sciences (Musandam)	2024	Khasab	https://www.utas.edu.om/musandam/
