= Thabti =

Thabti Arabic: الثابتي
- Village
- Location in Oman
- Coordinates: 22°43′53″N 58°31′49″E
- Country: Oman
- Region: Ash Sharqiyah Region

Population (2010)
  - Total: 1,425
- Time zone: UTC+4 (Oman Standard Time)
- Area code: 90110020

Thabti (Arabic: الثابتي) is a village in the Wilayat of Ibra, in the Ash Sharqiyah Region of Oman. It is located about 170 km from Muscat. The village has an estimated population of 1,425 people according to Oman's national census in 2010, and lies northeast in Upper Ibra. The two sheikhs of the village are Abdullah bin Saleh Al Yazeedi, leading the Al Yazeedi tribe, a sub-tribe of the Al Maskary tribe, and Khalifa bin Hamood Al Riyami, leading the Al Riyami families in the village.

== Etymology ==
The name "Thabti" originates from the Arabic word thabit (Arabic: ثابت), meaning fixed or steadfast, referring to the solid nature of the village's falaj, which purportedly continued at a time of drought when other aflaj in neighbouring villages dried up. The exact same story was attributed to the origin of the neighbouring village of Al Yahmadi, indicating a common origin myth attributed to both villages names.

== Economy ==
Thabti is an agricultural village which mainly produces dates, alfalfa, mangoes and other crops. The village also has livestock, with goats, cattle and poultry all reared in the village.

== Places of interest ==
- Falaj Ath-Thabti is one of the most important sites in the village, and although it ran dry for a period of 15 years it was brought back to flow in 2014. The falaj is the main source of water for the village's agriculture, and it is also the namesake of the village. The falaj runs for approximately 10 kilometres and irrigates the village farms.
- Al Owaisiyah Mosque is the oldest mosque in the village and is considered a local monument. It was a tourist attraction in Ibra for its status as an historical landmark.
- Village Sablas - Thabti has several function halls attached to mosques in the village that operate during festivals, mourning and crises.
- Thabti village market (habta), mainly active in Eid, is acclaimed as one of the most important village markets in Ibra. In it one can find local handicraft produced by the villagers including hand-woven fabrics and dresses, khanjars, leather sandals, and other handicraft.
