= WSB Universities =

WSB Universities may refer to:

- WSB Merito Universities, a group of state-recognized private (non-public) universities in Poland (Poznań, Chorzów, Gdańsk, Toruń, Wrocław)
- WSB University, a state-recognized private (non-public) university in Poland (Dąbrowa Górnicza, Kraków, Żywiec, Olkusz, Cieszyn, Gliwice, Tychy, Jaworzno, Katowice, Warszawa)
