= Oman Medical College =

Coordinates: 23°33′08″N 58°23′57″E

Oman Medical College كلية عُمان الطبية
- Type: Private
- Active: 2001–2018
- Affiliations: West Virginia University
- Chairman: Sheik Salem Al Araimi
- Dean: Yaseen Al-lawati
- Location: Muscat, Boushar, Oman
- Website: www.omc.edu.om

Oman Medical College was a medical college in the Sultanate of Oman established in 2001. The college was situated in Muscat and Sohar in the North Batinha region. The pharmacy campus was located in Bowsher. In 2018, Oman Medical College merged with Caledonian College of Engineering to form the National University of Science and Technology.

First year is taught as a foundation course and second and third years are completed before the medical school years of Sohar campus. Some part of the coursework is also completed in Rustaq with students taking courses with doctors at Rustaq hospital. The associated hospital with the Sohar campus is Sohar hospital, one of the biggest governmental hospitals in the country. Total course work spans over a period of 7 years and the degree awarded is that of a Doctor of Medicine (M.D). The Bowsher campus also offers a degree in pharmacy (Bachelor of Science in Pharmacy). This degree spans over a period of 5 and a half years.

== See also ==
- List of universities and colleges in Oman
