= Franklin University =

Private university in Columbus, Ohio, US

- Seal of Franklin University
- Former name: YMCA School of Commerce
- Type: Private university
- Established: 1902; 124 years ago
- Endowment: $118.4 million (2025)
- President: David R. Decker
- Provost: Christopher L. Washington
- Location: Columbus, Ohio, United States; 39°57′29″N 82°59′28″W
- Campus: Various locations Online
- Website: franklin.edu

Franklin University is a private university with its main campus in Columbus, Ohio, United States. It was founded in 1902 to serve the needs of students beyond traditional undergraduate age. On-site courses are offered at the university's campus in Columbus' Discovery District. However, most students take courses online. The university has over 25 location centers in the Midwestern United States and a majority online population, and reports an average student age of 34 years.

== History ==
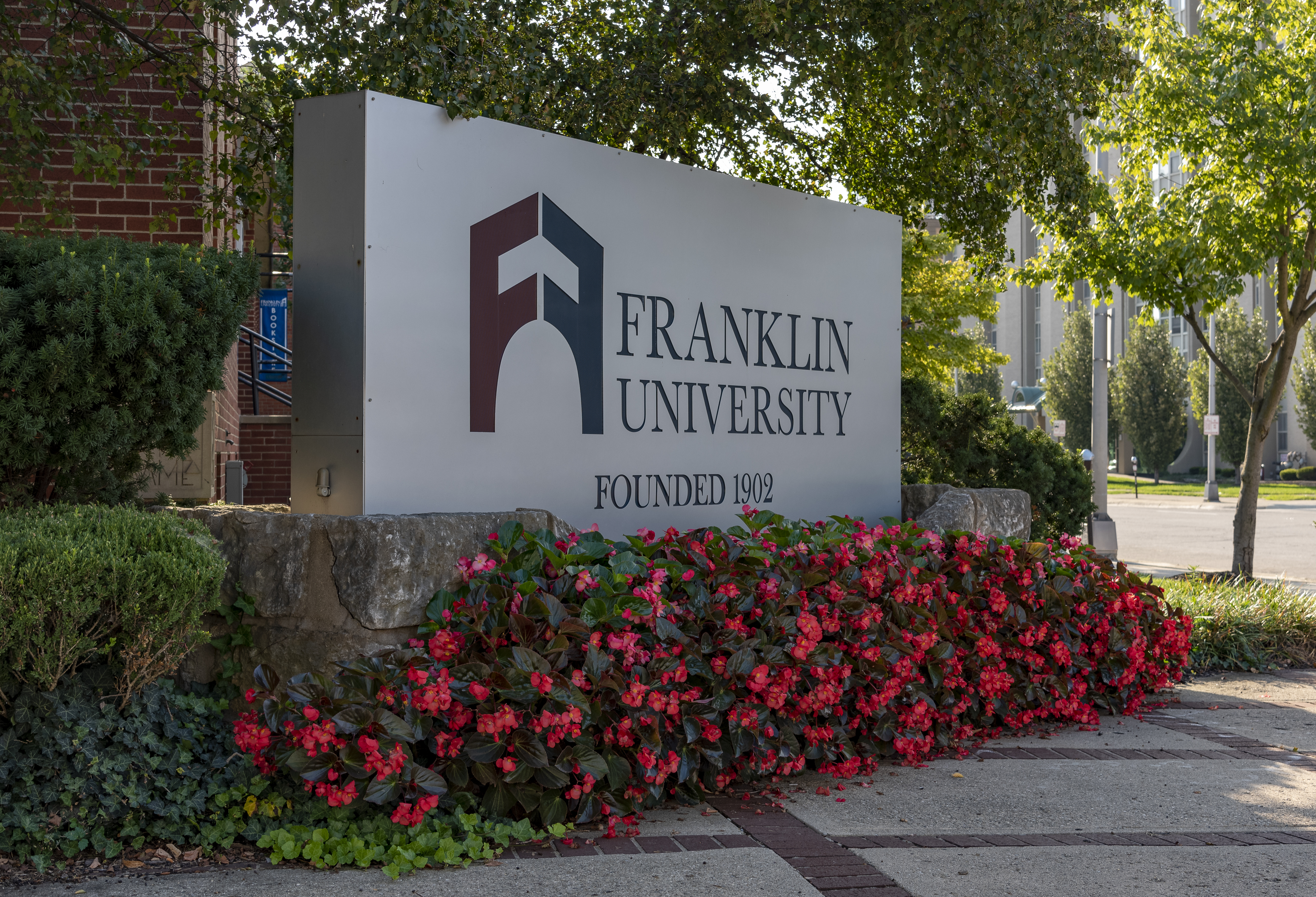
Sign on Grant Avenue

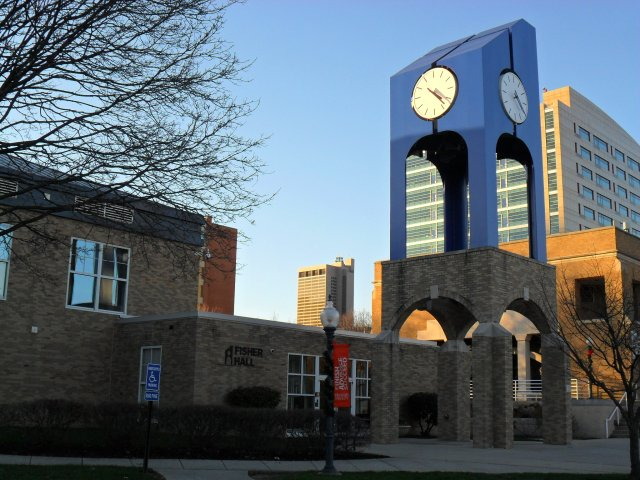
Franklin University Clock Tower in front of Fisher Hall

The Huntington Courtyard on Franklin's Main Campus

Franklin University has a history of serving older adult students that spans more than a hundred years. It was founded in 1902 at the Columbus Downtown YMCA, under its sponsorship as the YMCA School of Commerce. It changed its name to Franklin University in 1933, and amicably discontinued its formal affiliation with the YMCA in 1964.

Five years later, in 1969, the institution opened its first building, Frasch Hall. In 1976, Franklin University earned regional accreditation from the North Central Association of Colleges and Schools.

In 1993, Franklin offered its first graduate program, the Master of Business Administration (MBA). In 1998, Franklin University created the Community College Alliance (CCA), a program designed to ease the way for community college students to transfer the maximum number of community college credits toward completing a bachelor's degree at Franklin.

In 2009, the university began offering its MBA at the WSB Merito Universities in Poland. Since signing this agreement with WSB, Franklin has entered into educational agreements with educational institutions in eight other countries.

Today, Franklin University offers a broad range of undergraduate majors and graduate programs. Its enrollment includes more than 300 international students from more than 72 countries. More than 135 community colleges across the U.S. have partnered with Franklin University to ease the way for community college students to transfer the maximum number of community college credits toward completing a bachelor's degree at Franklin. Franklin's Community College Alliance Program.

In August 2011, Franklin announced its newest college, the College of Health and Public Administration or COHPA. Franklin now has three colleges, Arts, Sciences, and Technology; The Ross College of Business, and the College of Health & Public Administration.

Franklin University acquired Urbana University in Urbana, Ohio, in 2014 and it served as a Franklin University branch campus until May 2020.

In May 2016, the Higher Learning Commission approved Franklin's request to offer its first three doctoral degrees, namely the Doctor of Business Administration, the Doctor of Health Administration and the Doctor of Professional Studies in Instructional Design Leadership.

The institution is a member of the Strategic Ohio Council for Higher Education (SOCHE).

== Locations ==
Franklin University's main campus is in downtown Columbus, Ohio.

In addition to its domestic locations, Franklin University offers programs at international locations through agreements with affiliated universities. These include the Wroclaw School of Banking in Wroclaw, Poland, St. Clement of Ohrid University of Bitola in Bitola, North Macedonia, and the Modern College of Business and Science in Oman.

== Academics ==
The university offers degrees at the associate, baccalaureate, master's, and doctoral levels. Many of these programs can be completed entirely online. Undergraduate admissions are open.

It also operates a coaching program that allows undergraduate and graduate students to be mentored toward reaching academic, professional, and personal goals under the guidance of professionals whom the university has appointed as coaches. Coaches are not university staff, but are professionals working in industry. Each coach has a one-to-one relationship to a Franklin University student and provides monthly mentoring and guidance to that student.

Franklin University is institutionally accredited by the Higher Learning Commission and authorized by the Ohio Department of Higher Education. Additionally, its business programs, including undergraduate and MBA programs, are accredited by the International Assembly for Collegiate Business Education (IACBE). The nursing baccalaureate program is accredited by Commission on Collegiate Nursing Education (CCNE).
