= National University of Science and Technology (Oman) =

Private university in Muscat, Oman

- Type: Private
- Established: 2018; 8 years ago
- Location: Muscat, Oman; 23.5521°N 58.3992°E
- Website: Official website

National University of Science and Technology (NUST) (Arabic: الجامعة الوطنية للعلوم والتكنولوجيا, romanized: al-Jāmiʻah al-Waṭanīyah lil-ʻUlūm wa-al-Tiknūlūjiyā) is a private university in Oman which was established in 2018 by merger of two professional colleges, Caledonian College of Engineering and Oman Medical College. Around 4300 international students from 33 countries have graduated from the university. NUST has academic partnerships with three international universities: Glasgow Caledonian University in Scotland, West Virginia University, U.S. and the University of South Carolina, U.S.

== Academics ==
The university is a multi campus with colleges in Muscat and Sohar. There are four colleges in the university. They are

- College of Engineering: The number of students is around 4000, from nationalities, and around 400 multinational academic, administrative and support staff.
- College of Medicine and Health Sciences: This is the only private College of Medicine and Health Sciences in Oman. It was established in 2001. Locals comprise 70% of the college population, and 30% are international students.
- College of Pharmacy: Beginning in 2003, Oman Medical College offered a Bachelor of Pharmacy program. This program laid the groundwork for creation of NUST’s College of Pharmacy in 2018.
- International Maritime College Oman: The college is in Sohar and offers programs in Nautical Studies, Marine Engineering, Process Engineering and Logistics and Transport Management.

== See also ==
- List of universities and colleges in Oman
- Sultanate of Oman higher education ministry
