= University of Buraimi =

University of Buriami
- Motto: Gateway to a unique education
- Type: For-profit
- Established: 2010; 15 years ago
- Location: Al Buraimi, Al Buraimi Governorate, Oman; 24.2355°N 55.8915°E
- Campus: Urban
- Website: University of Buraimi
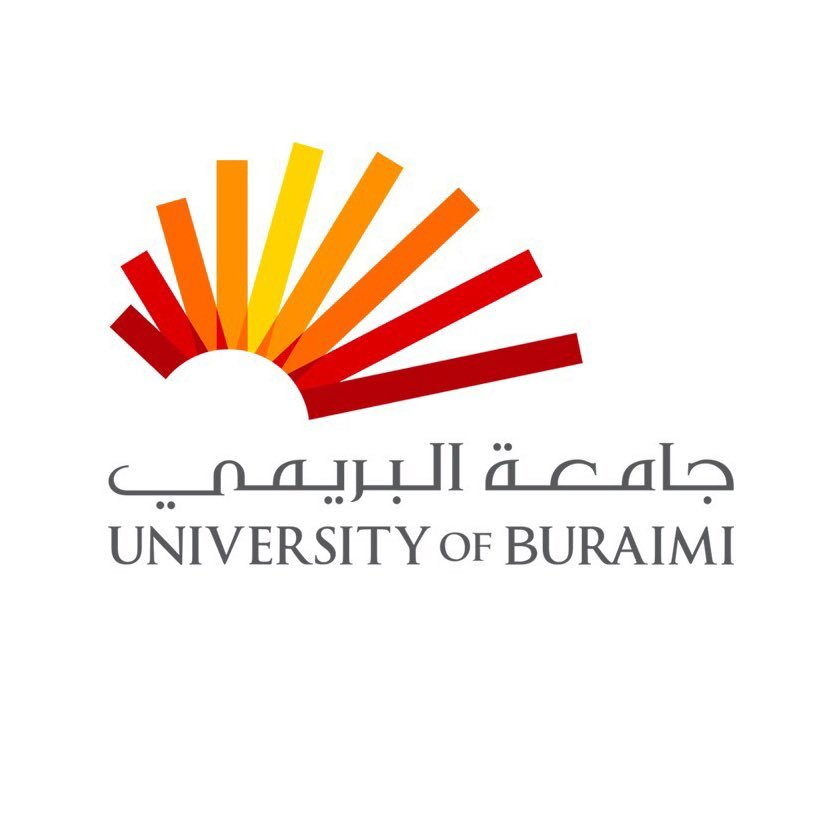

The University of Buraimi (UOB) (Arabic: جامعة البريمي) is a private university in the Al Buraimi Governorate in the Northern part of Oman. The university opened on 6 November 2010. The university is a product of a European-Omani consortium and offers programs under Omani and European control.

== See also ==
- List of universities and colleges in Oman
