= University of Technology and Applied Sciences =

Public university in Oman

- جامعة التقنية والعلوم التطبيقية
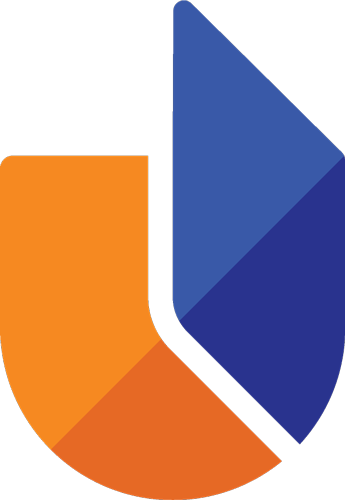
- Former names: Oman Technical Industrial College, Higher College of Technology, College of Technology, College of Applied Sciences, Rustaq College of Education
- Type: Public
- Established: 1984; 42 years ago as Oman Technical Industrial College; 2001; 25 years ago as Higher College of Technology; 2020; 6 years ago as University of Technology and Applied Sciences
- Chairman: Muhad Saeed Baouin
- Vice-Chancellor: Saeed Al Rubai
- Students: 48,781
- Location: Muscat, Salalah, Nizwa, Suhar, Al-Musannah, Shinas, Ibri, Ibra, Rustaq, Sur, Khasab
- Address: PO Box 74, Al-Khuwair, Postal Code 133, Oman
- Colors: Blue and Orange
- Nickname: UTAS
- Website: www.utas.edu.om

University of Technology and Applied Sciences (UTAS; Arabic: جامعة التقنية والعلوم التطبيقية, romanized: Jāmiʿat at-Tiqniyya wa-l-ʿUlūm at-Taṭbīqiyya) is a public university operating in 9 governorates in Oman. It has 11 branches spread over different parts of the country. It was the first Higher Education institution and is the largest in Oman, with over 46,000 students.

As of January 2021, the UTAS has 46,230 students.

== History ==
Before the merger, the university consisted of two colleges: the College of Technology and the College of Applied Sciences.

The College of Technology had seven branches. The College of Applied Sciences had thirteen public colleges with six campuses.

== Branches ==
University/College	Foundation	City
Muscat Governorate
University of Technology and Applied Sciences (Muscat)	1984	Bawsher
Al Batinah North Governorate
University of Technology and Applied Sciences (Shinas)	2005	Shinas
University of Technology and Applied Sciences (Sohar)	2007	Sohar
Ad Dakhiliyah Governorate
University of Technology and Applied Sciences (Nizwa)	1995	Nizwa
Al Batinah South Governorate
University of Technology and Applied Sciences (Mussanah)	2001	Mussanah
University of Technology and Applied Sciences (Rustaq)	2008	Rustaq
Dhofar Governorate
University of Technology and Applied Sciences (Salalah)	2001	Salalah
Ash Sharqiyah South Governorate
University of Technology and Applied Sciences (Sur)	2005	Sur
Ash Sharqiyah North Governorate
University of Technology and Applied Sciences (Ibra)	2001	Ibra
Al Dhahirah Governorate
University of Technology and Applied Sciences (Ibri)	2007	Ibri
Musandam Governorate
University of Technology and Applied Sciences (Musandam)	2024	Khasab
