= Modern College of Business and Science =

Private university located in Muscat, Oman

- الكلية الحديثة للتجارة والعلوم (Arabic)
- Type: Private
- Established: 1996; 30 years ago
- Chairman: Dr. Muneer Al Maskari
- Dean: Dr. Moosa Al Kindi
- Location: Bawshar Street, Way No. 273, Building No. 259, Bawshar, Muscat, Oman; 23°33′13″N 58°24′05″E
- Website: www.mcbs.edu.om

Modern College of Business and Science (MCBS) is a private higher education institution located in Bawshar, Oman. Established in 1996, the college is regulated by the Ministry of Education, following the restructuring of higher education governance in Oman. The institution has also undergone quality assurance review by the Oman Authority for Quality Assurance of Education (OAQAE), formerly known as the Oman Authority for Academic Accreditation and Quality Assurance of Education (OAAAQA).

== Programs ==
The Modern College of Business and Science offers undergraduate and postgraduate programs across a range of academic disciplines. As of 2025, the institution offers 29 academic programs, including 20 bachelor's programs, 7 master's programs, and 2 doctoral programs. Programs are offered with English and Arabic as mediums of instruction and span areas such as business, economics, law, aviation, information technology, artificial intelligence, cybersecurity, digital business, statistics, game development, public administration, and finance.

The college also offers professional development, continuing education, and specialized training opportunities for individual learners.

== Affiliations and partnerships ==
The Modern College of Business and Science maintains affiliations and partnerships with international universities, professional organizations, and industry collaborators. The institution holds accreditation from the Accreditation Service for International Schools, Colleges, and Universities (ASIC), a United Kingdom–based international accreditation organization for independent educational institutions.

MCBS collaborates academically with Franklin University Ohio, USA through a hosted Master of Business Administration (MBA) franchise program delivered at its campus in Oman. The MBA program is accredited by the International Assembly for Collegiate Business Education (IACBE).

Through its Innovation X Hub, the college collaborates with industry and research partners, including projects supported by Boeing focused on aviation, innovation, and advanced mobility initiatives.

In 2024, MCBS joined the Association to Advance Collegiate Schools of Business (AACSB) Business Education Alliance. The institution is also a signatory to the Principles for Responsible Management Education (PRME) initiative and has received recognition through the Association for the Advancement of Sustainability in Higher Education (AASHE) STARS framework for sustainability engagement.

== Rankings and recognition ==
The Modern College of Business and Science has received recognition through regional and international ranking and quality assessment frameworks. In 2024, the institution was awarded a five-star rating by the QS Stars university rating system.

In the QS World University Rankings Arab Region 2025, MCBS was included among ranked universities in the Arab region. The institution was reported as the first private college in Oman to enter the top 100 of the QS Arab Region rankings.

The college has also been included in the Times Higher Education Impact Rankings, which assess universities based on their contributions to the United Nations Sustainable Development Goals (SDGs).

In sustainability recognition, MCBS received a Gold rating under the Sustainability Tracking, Assessment & Rating System (STARS) administered by the Association for the Advancement of Sustainability in Higher Education (AASHE).

== History and Founding ==
The Modern College of Business and Science (MCBS) was established in 1996 as one of the early private higher education institutions in Oman. The institution was founded through the initiative of Dr. Muneer Al Maskari, who played a central role in shaping the college’s early vision and development. His Highness Sayyid Shihab bin Tariq Al Said served as the college’s first chairman, supporting its establishment and early governance alongside founding stakeholders including Sheikh Saif Hashil Al Maskery, Engineer Ali bin Mohammed Al Mahrooqi, Late Col. Mohammed bin Abdallah Al-Riyamy, Engineer Azza bint Mohammed Al Mahrooqi, and Ms. Sheikha bin Mohammed Al Mahrooqi. Since its founding, MCBS has expanded its academic portfolio, research activity, and international partnerships, serving students across undergraduate and postgraduate disciplines.

== See also ==
- List of universities and colleges in Oman
