= Majan University College =

Higher education institution in Oman

Coordinates: 23.615722°N 58.546795°E

- Former names: Majan College (University College)
- Motto: Together we transform lives.
- Type: Private
- Established: 1995; 31 years ago
- Accreditation: Oman Authority for Academic Accreditation and Quality Assurance of Education
- Academic affiliations: University of Bedfordshire(UK)
- Dean: Dr Maha Kobeil
- Location: Way No. 2621, Building No. 1986, P.O Box: 710, P.C: 112, Muscat, Muscat, Oman
- Campus: Urban
- Language: Arabic and English
- Colours: Magenta and Blue
- Website: www.majancollege.edu.om

Majan University College in Muscat, Oman, is a higher education institution in Oman and accredited College of the University of Bedfordshire, UK.

== History ==
Majan University College was established in 1995 as the first private higher education institution in the Sultanate of Oman, going on to develop a suite of undergraduate and master's degrees, cementing its reputation as a leading higher education provider. In December 2017 it became the first higher education institution in the country to receive accreditation from the Oman Academic Accreditation Authority (OAAA). In 2024, Majan University College became the first higher education institution in Oman to achieve national institutional reaccreditation.

== Affiliations and partnerships ==
Majan University College has been affiliated with the University of Bedfordshire, United Kingdom, since 1998 and it offers undergraduate and postgraduate degree programmes leading to University of Bedfordshire awards.

MUC has a longstanding relationship with the UK’s Higher Education Academy (now Advance HE) and sponsors staff to become Fellows of the Higher Education Academy.

Majan is a member of the World Technology Universities Network (WTUN), a global network of technology-focused universities, to support student and staff international engagement.

MUC collaborates with the British Council on research in English Language Teaching and offers IELTS and EnglishScore exams.

The College partners with several renowned professional bodies such as the Association of Chartered Certified Accountants (ACCA), Chartered Institute of Marketing (CIM), Institute of Management Accountants, and Ethica CIFE to offer professional certifications.

In 2024, MUC's BA (Hons) English Language was recognised by the UK’s Chartered Institute of Linguists, making Majan the first higher education institution in Oman and only the third in the Gulf region to achieve such recognition.

== Academic units ==
Majan’s academic programmes are curated by its three Faculties and Postgraduate Centre. Non-credit courses are offered by the Majan Training Institute. All bachelor's and master's programmes except for the Arabic-medium MBA are taught in English and lead to University of Bedfordshire awards. The Arabic-medium MBA, for which MUC is the awarding institution, was launched in 2024. Currently, the College offers the following academic programmes:

Faculty of Business Management

- BA (Hons) Business Administration (with 8 specialist pathways available)
- BSc (Hons) Business Analytics with Artificial Intelligence
- BSc (Hons) Finance and Technology (under development)
- BA (Hons) Marketing
- BA (Hons) Accounting
- BA (Hons) Islamic Banking and Finance
- BA (Hons) Finance

Faculty of Information Technology

- BSc (Hons) Computer and Internet Applications
- BSc (Hons) Networking
- BSc (Hons) Computing – Banking Information Systems
- BSc (Hons) Computing – Software Engineering
- BSc (Hons) Computing – Oil & Gas

Faculty of English Language Studies

- BA (Hons) English Language
- General Foundation Programme (a one-year bridging programme between school and postsecondary studies)

Postgraduate Centre

- Master of Business Administration
- MBA (Arabic-medium)
- MSc in Computer Science
- MA in International Human Resource Management
- MA in Applied Linguistics

Majan Training Institute

MUC’s Majan Training Institute provides short courses in the areas of Accounting, Finance, Information Technology, Marketing, English Language and Leadership.

== Alumni ==
- His Excellency Ahmed bin Jaafar bin Salim Al-Musalmi - Governor of the Central Bank of Oman
- Abdullah bin Al-Waleed bin Zahir Al-Hinai - Member, Majlis al-Shura (Consultative Assembly of the Council of Oman)
- Her Excellency Dr Jokha Abdullah Al Shukaili - CEO of Oman Authority for Academic Accreditation and Quality Assurance of Education
- Aisha Humaid Abdullah Al Tobi - Chargé d'Affaires, Omani Embassy to Australia

== Campus ==
Majan’s green campus consists of five buildings, which are home to the College Administration, Faculties, Postgraduate Centre, Library, classrooms, laboratories, study and recreational spaces, and a mosque. In 2018, MUC expanded its campus in Darsait to include a new six-storey building, which houses equipped classrooms, laboratories, an auditorium with the capacity to accommodate 500 people, a cafeteria and student spaces.

== See also ==
- List of universities and colleges in Oman
