= Sultan's School =

Coordinates: 23.638824°N 58.212379°E

The Sultan's School
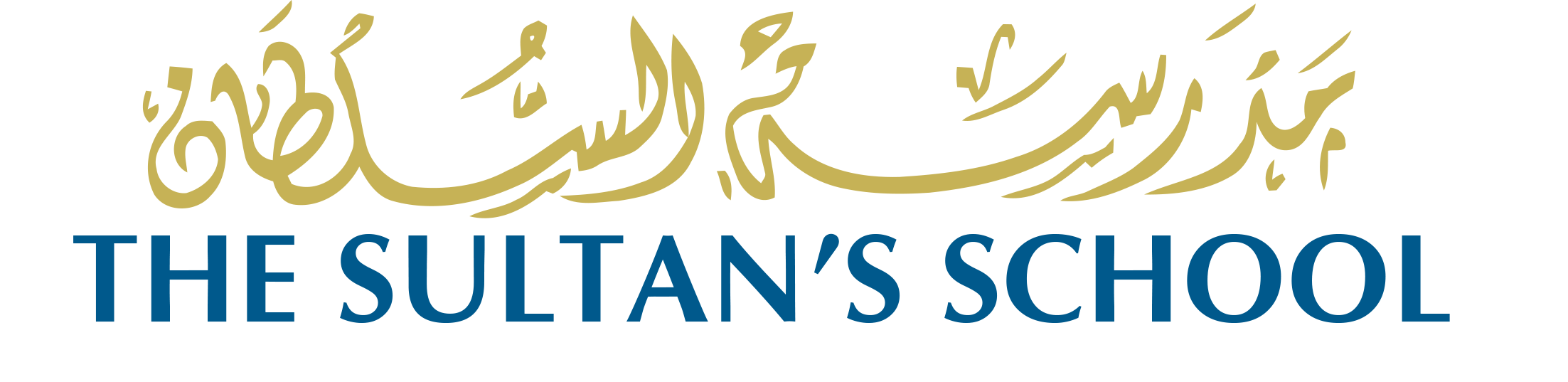

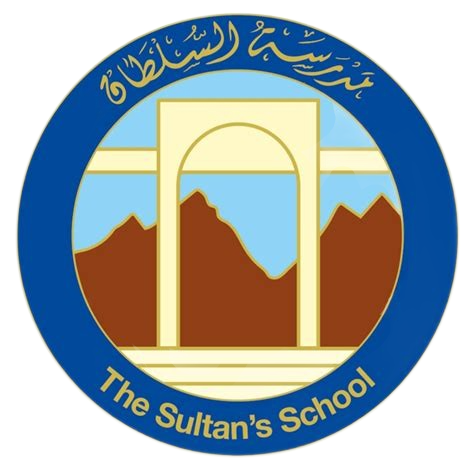
- Seeb; Oman

Information
- Type: Private
- Motto: "Opening minds for LIFE"
- Established: February 24th, 1977
- Chairman: Major General Dr. Sulaiman Al Harthy
- Principal: Mr. Nigel Fossey
- Gender: Co-educational
- Website: Official website

The Sultan's School is a private school in Seeb, Oman. It was founded in 1977.

The student roll is around 1300 from KG through to year 13. The curriculum is bilingual, with Arabic Language, Islamic Education and Social Studies taught in Arabic, and English Language, Mathematics and the Sciences taught in English. A full range of foundation subjects are taught in both languages.

== Curriculum ==
The English curriculum in the elementary school is based on the English National Curriculum and the Arabic curriculum follows the Ministry of Education's "Basic Education Program". In the secondary school, the curriculum is aimed towards preparation for the International General Certificate of Secondary Education examinations. The International Baccalaureate Diploma (IBD) is also offered in Years 12 and 13. The IB Diploma Program (DP) is a course of study for students aged 16–19 years of age. Current options outside of the core include Information Technology, Business Studies, Economics, Drama, Art, and Design and Technology.
