= Indian School, Al-Ghubra =

International school in Al-Ghubra, Oman

Coordinates: 23.58776°N 58.39608°E

Information
- Established: 1990; 36 years ago
- Principal: Mrs. Papri Ghosh
- Houses: Muscat; Nizwa; Sohar; Sur

The Indian School Al Ghubra (ISG) is an independent, co-educational private day school located in the city of Muscat in the Sultanate of Oman. The school was founded in July 1990 by Indian born Omani businessman P Mohamed Ali, the managing director of Galfar Engineering and Contracting.

Mr. B S Bhatnagar was the principal of the school from 1991 to spring 2006. The present principal is Mrs. Papri Ghosh, who succeeded Mr. G. Thangadurai in 2008.

IP has been recent additions to the subject list. The school also offers languages such as Malayalam, French, Arabic, Sanskrit and Hindi as the Second and Third Languages from grade 6 onward till grade 9.

== CBSE Nationals ==
The school offers educational services starting by the CBSE.

The school takes part in the CBSE (Indian) national level tournaments in athletics, badminton, chess, cricket, football, swimming, table-tennis etc.

== Principals ==
- Mr. B S Bhatnagar (1991–2006)
- Mr. G. Thangadurai (2006–2007)
- Mrs. Papri Ghosh (2008–present)
