= Aflaj Irrigation Systems of Oman =

Ancient water channels in Oman

UNESCO World Heritage Site
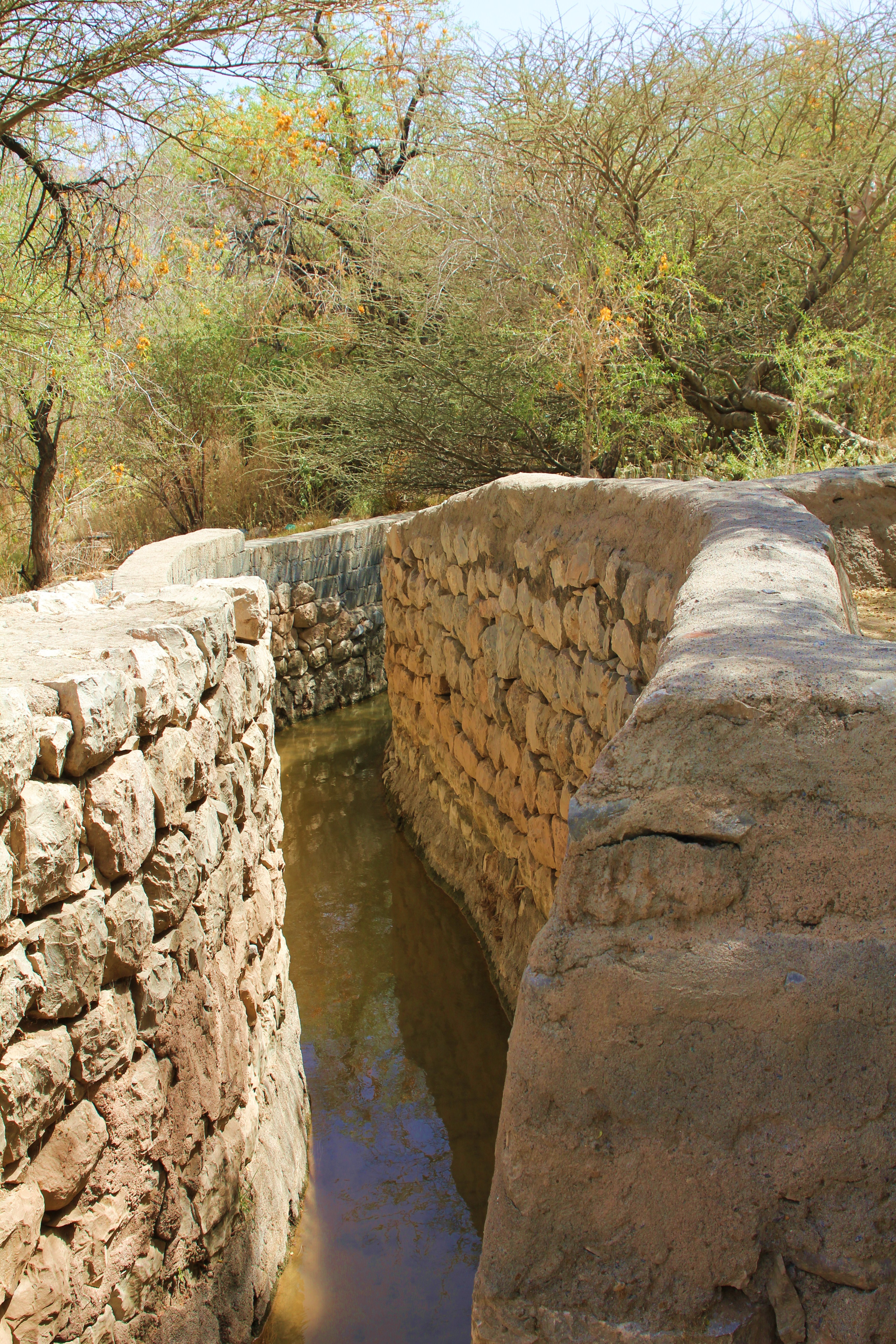
- Falaj Daris

- Location within Oman
- Location: Oman
- Criteria: Cultural: (v)
- Reference: 1207
- Inscription: 2006 (30th Session)

The Aflaj Irrigation Systems of Oman are ancient water harvesting, transportation, storage and distribution systems from AD 500 located in the Omani regions of Dakhiliyah, Sharqiyah and Batinah. They represent an ancient type of Middle Eastern irrigation system with a history going back 5,000 years in that region. One type is associated with a water system known as qanat or kariz, originating from Persia and present there and in countries of the Arabian Peninsula near Oman. Aflaj systems may include an underground horizontal section accessed by vertical shafts, which collects water from the aquifer by using the same technology as the Iranian qanat systems. They always include surface channels for transport and distribution.

"Aflaj" (Arabic: أفلاج) is the plural of "falaj" (Arabic: فلج), which means "split into parts" in classical Arabic. This irrigation system effectively divided the water among all the inhabitants; it flowed by gravity from its original sources to homes and cropland. The complex included watchtowers to protect it, but also mosques and other buildings.

In 2006, five aflaj were added to the UNESCO list of World Heritage Sites under the name "Aflaj Irrigation Systems of Oman": Falaj Al-Khatmeen, Falaj Al-Malki, Falaj Daris, Falaj Al-Mayassar and Falaj Al-Jeela.

== Types and maintenance ==
The Aflaj Inventory Project offers data about the aflaj systems. There are three main types of aflaj in Oman:

- daudi (also dawoodi, daoudi) or iddi aflaj: underground channels, with an abundant, perennial flow of water dependant on changes in the groundwater table. Found on the upstream plains of Sharqiyah, Dakhiliyah, Dhahirah and the Batinah regions. Up to 12 km long, 0.5-1 m wide, 0.5-2 m high, reaching up to 50 m below ground level. May have dozens of branches, which increase the flow. Al Malki falaj in Izki holds the record with 17 branches. The name shows that they are attributed to Prophet Dawood. The daudi type accounts for 23.5% of all of Oman's aflaj.
- ghaili aflaj: seasonal flow, determined by groundwater level and rainfall. Fed mainly from pools building up downstream of wadis during rainy season. Open channels, covered only within wadis. Up to 4 metres deep below ground surface and 100 m - 2 km long. Most prevalent type in northern Oman, and 48.5% of the country's total number of aflaj.
- aini aflaj: exploit mountain springs fed by deep geological strata and use open channels. Water often contains sulphur, is sometimes hot and can be therapeutic, for instance against rheumatism. The best known Omani hot springs are Ain Al Thawarah in Nakhal, Ain Al Kasfah in Al Rustaq and Ain Arzat in Jebal Al Qara in Dhofar. The aini type constitute some 28% of the total number of Omani aflaj.

This diversity indicates the nuanced understanding and exploitation of local hydrogeological conditions to secure water throughout the year. The aflaj systems feature access shafts built every 20 meters along the tunnel for ventilation and debris removal. A distinct feature is the ring of burnt clay at the shaft mouth, which prevents tunnel collapse and flooding, safeguards the water from pollution, and stops people and animals from falling in. This highlights the sophisticated engineering and preventive measures embedded in the design to ensure durability and cleanliness of the water supply.

Despite their ancient origins, about 3,000 aflaj systems remain functional, underlining their enduring value to Oman's agricultural and domestic water supply. The maintenance and care of these systems, as in the case of Birkat Al Mus, showcase the communal effort and the high regard for water monitors or trustees ( wakils), who play a crucial role in preserving the clarity and purity of the water, essential for the survival of these desert communities.

== Bombing during the 1950s Jebel Akhdar War ==
Declassified information by the British National Archives later revealed that the British government deliberately destroyed the Aflaj Irrigation systems and crops by air strikes during the Jebel Akhdar War of the late 1950s in order to prevent locals in the interior of Oman from gathering crops and having access to water supplies. Wadi Beni Habib and the water channel at Semail were among the water supplies that were deliberately damaged. Air strikes on Saiq and Sharaijah rendered cultivation in the areas "hazardous". Furthermore, these documents reveal that the British Foreign Secretary gave the approval on 4 August 1957 to carry out air strikes without prior warning to the locals residing in the interior of Oman. The ban on visas for the press by the sultan and the ability of the British government to carry out air strikes discreetly using Masirah Airfield helped in sustaining the military operations under low profile.

== World Heritage-designated aflaj ==
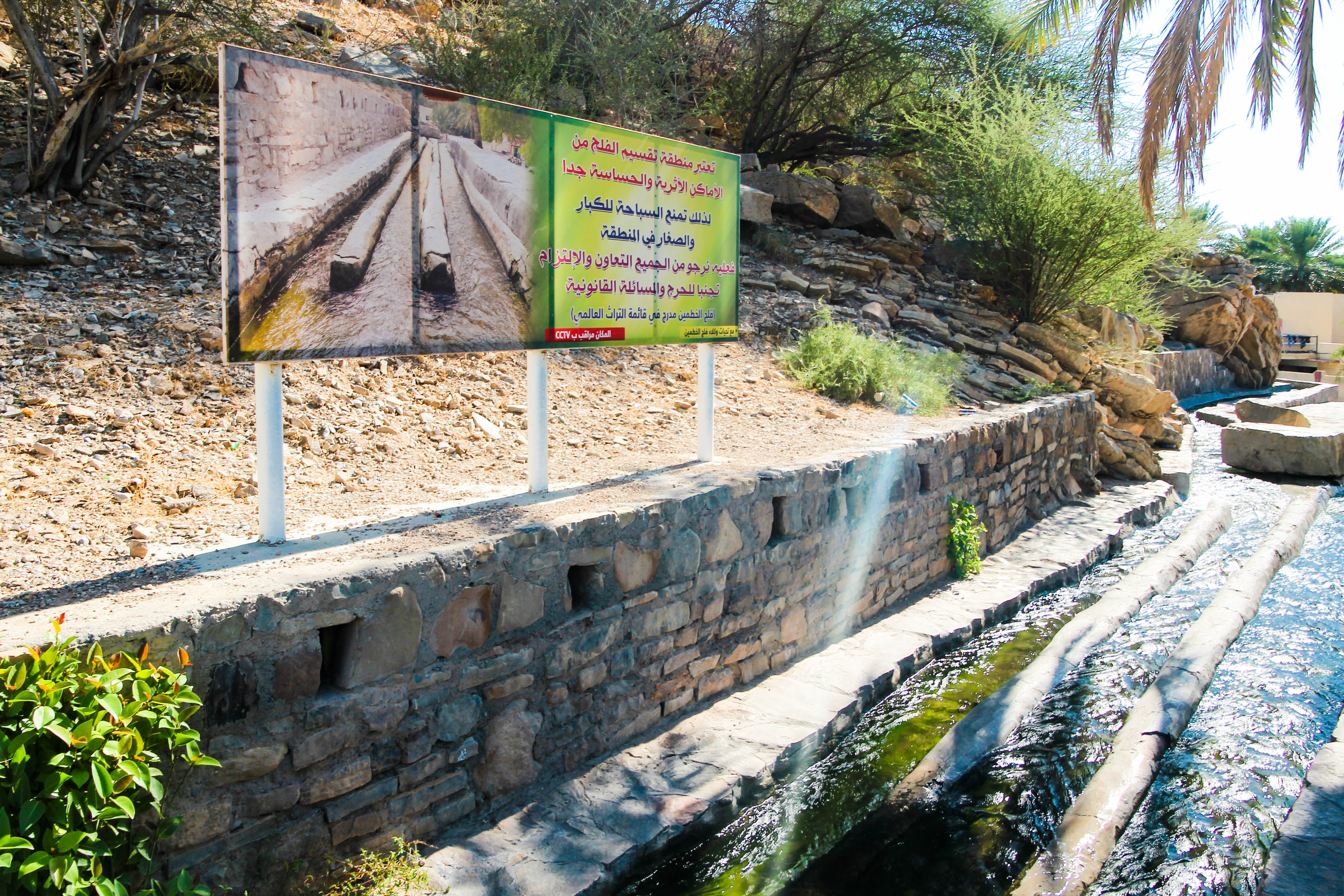
Al-Katmeen

Falaj	Coordinates	Area	Region
Al-Katmeen	22°56′0″N 57°40′0″E	135.028 ha (0.52135 sq mi)	Dakhiliyah
Al-Malki	22°44′0″N 57°46′0″E	600 ha (2.3 sq mi)	Dakhiliyah
Daris	22°59′0″N 57°32′0″E	389.468 ha (1.50374 sq mi)	Dakhiliyah
Al-Jeela	22°47′0″N 59°10′0″E	30.952 ha (0.11951 sq mi)	Sharqiyah
Al-Muyasser	23°21′0″N 57°27′0″E	300.501 ha (1.16024 sq mi)	Batinah

== See also ==
- Al Hajar montane woodlands
