= WSB Merito Universities =

Group of private universities in Poland

- Uniwersytety WSB Merito
- Type: Private university
- Established: 1994
- Affiliations: Erasmus/Erasmus+, ECTS, ETS and other
- Students: >50,000
- Location: Poznań, Chorzów, Gdańsk, Toruń, Wrocław, in Poland (EU)
- Campus: Poznań, Chorzów, Szczecin, Gdańsk, Gdynia, Toruń, Bydgoszcz, Wrocław, Warsaw, Opole (all urban)
- Website: https://uniwersytetymerito.pl/english/

WSB Merito Universities (Polish: Uniwersytety WSB Merito, formerly Polish: Wyższe Szkoły Bankowe, Wyższa Szkoła Bankowa) are group of state-recognized private (non-public) universities in Poland. WSB Universities are the largest group of business schools in Poland and have been conducting educational activities in ten Polish cities. In 2013 – 82% and in 2014, 85% of students of WSB Universities were studying and at the same time working, gaining work experience and professional competence.

Founded in 1994 by Tertiary Education Development Center "TEB Akademia" (en. TEB Academy). On 10 August 1994, WSB launched its first field of study – "finance and banking". The WSB Universities offer higher education and research facilities. WSB offer includes first-cycle studies (Bachelor's and Engineering), second-cycle studies (Master's and Master's with post-graduate programmes), long-cycle Master's studies (5 years), post-graduate programmes, MBA and Executive MBA, as well as courses and training sessions. Further, the university is an Educational Testing Service (ETS), thus enabling to take exams and obtain TOEIC language certificates.

== Structure ==
Faculties (departments) of the WSB Universities in Poland

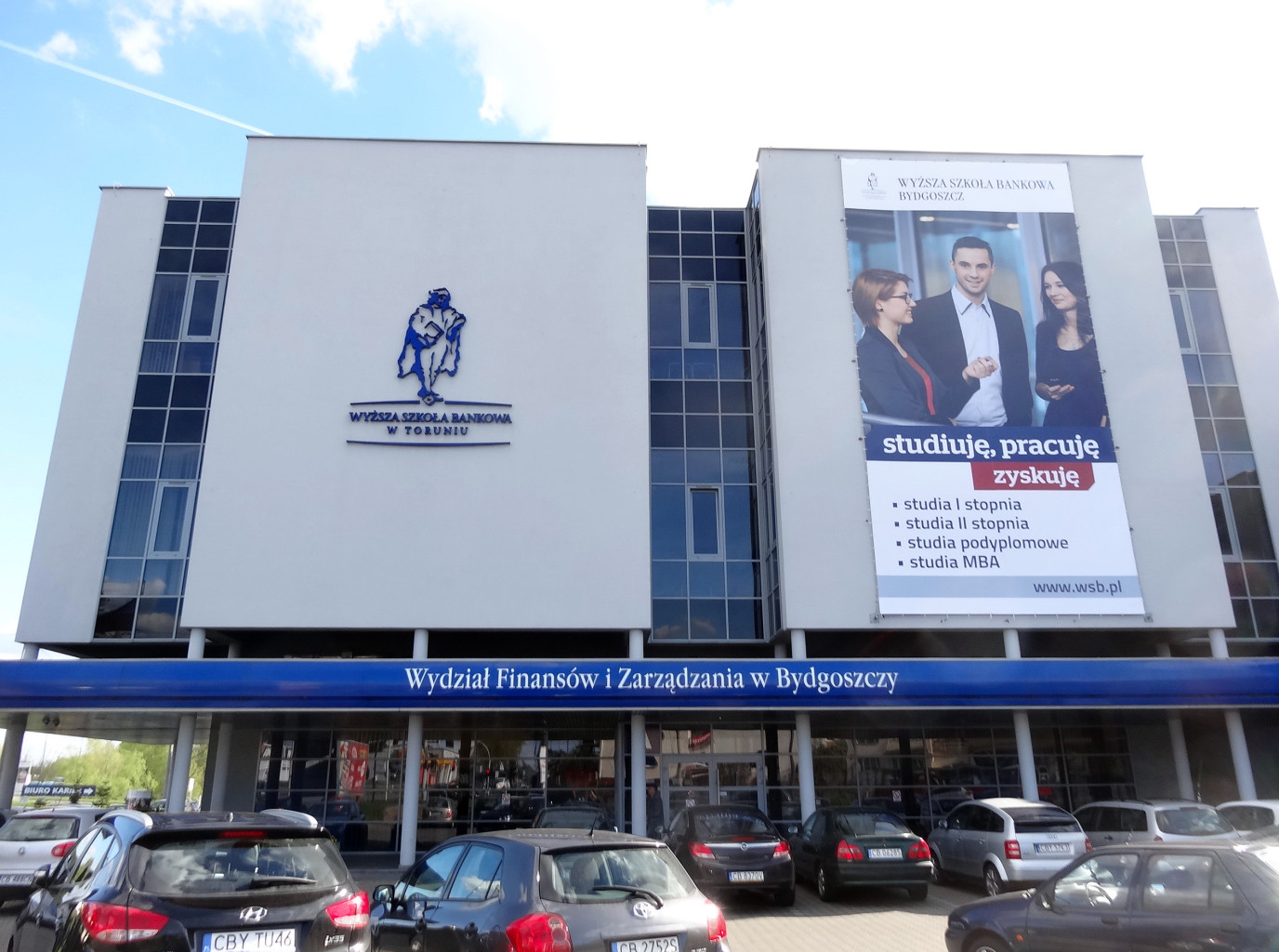
University campus in Bydgoszcz

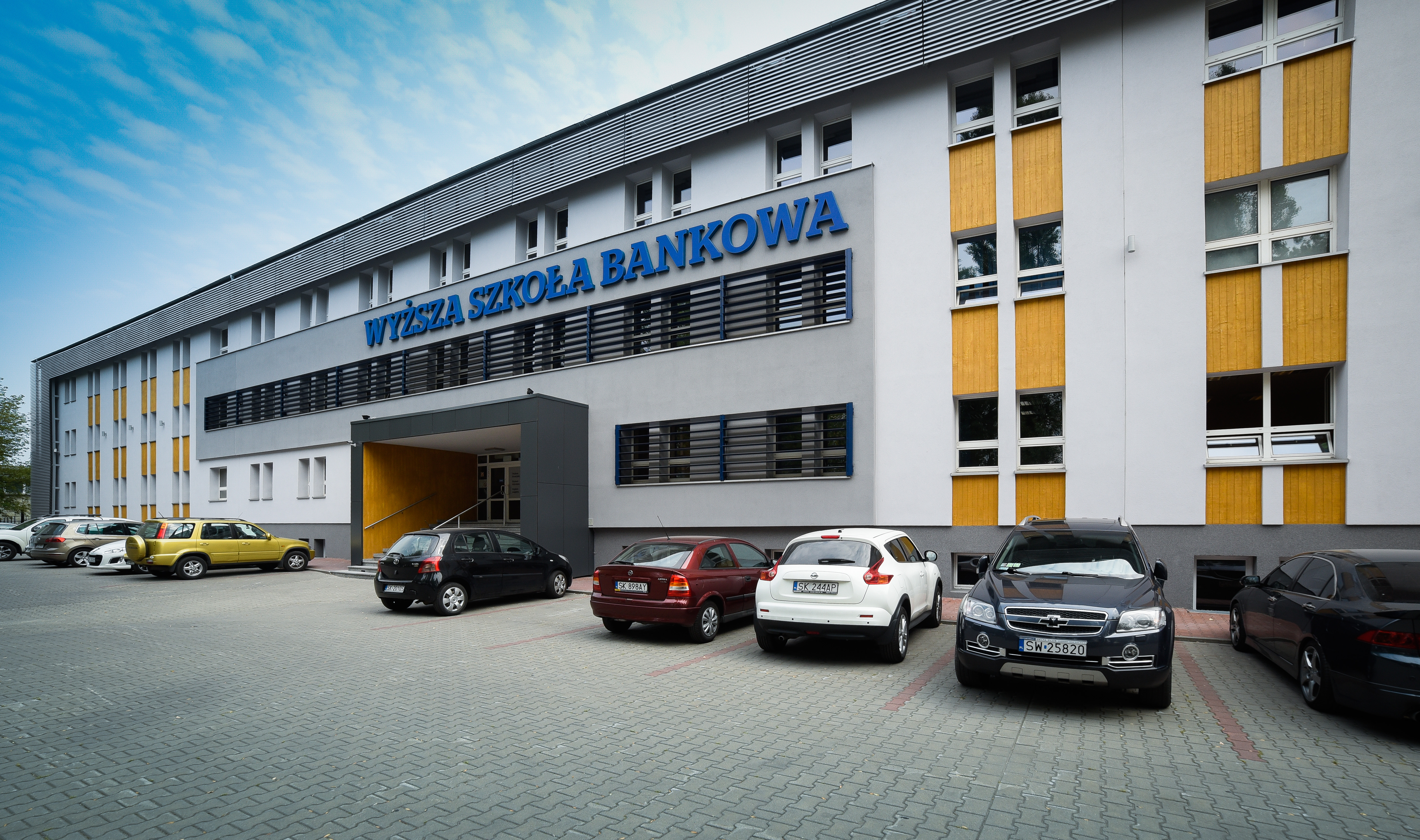
University campus in Chorzow

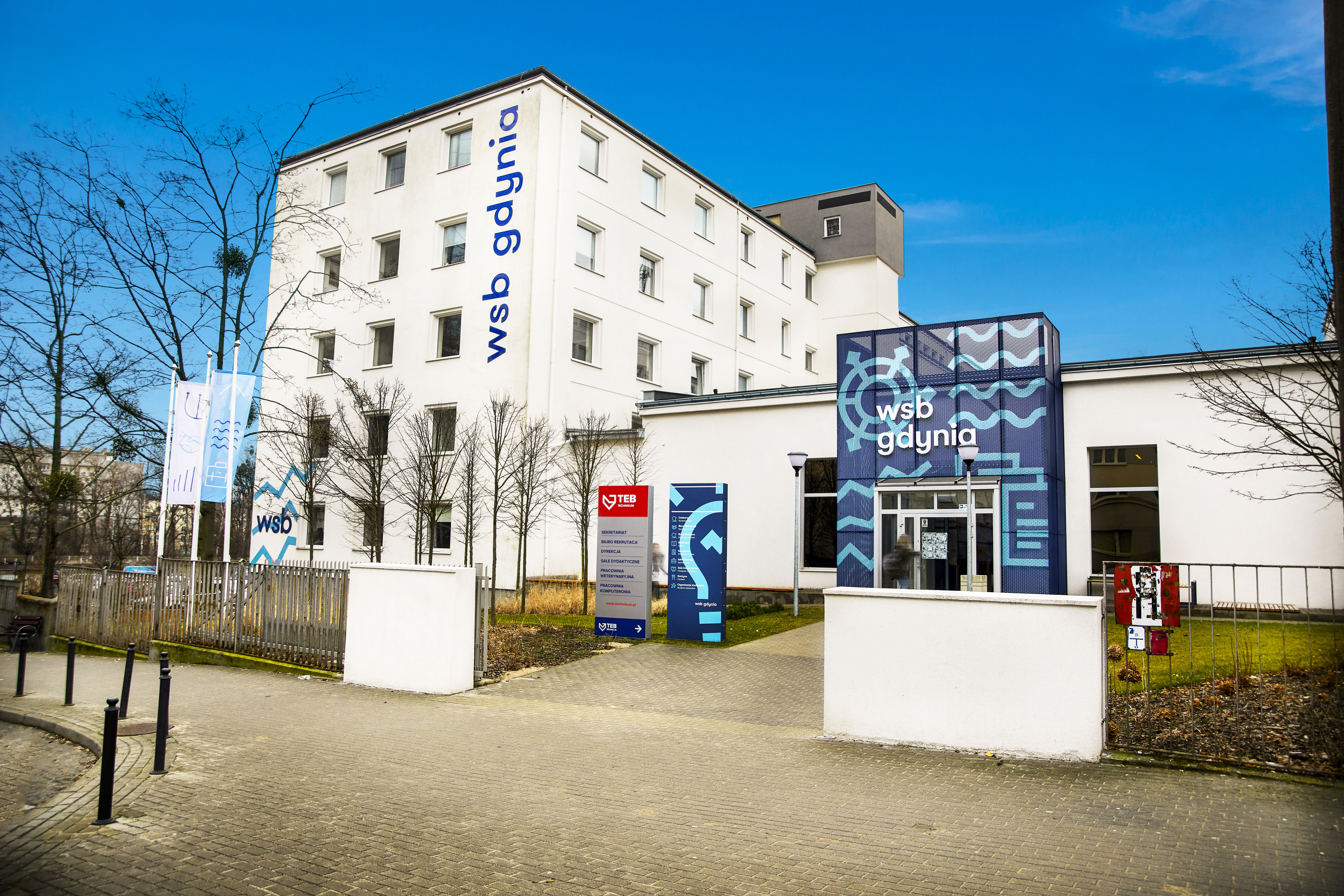
University campus in Gdynia

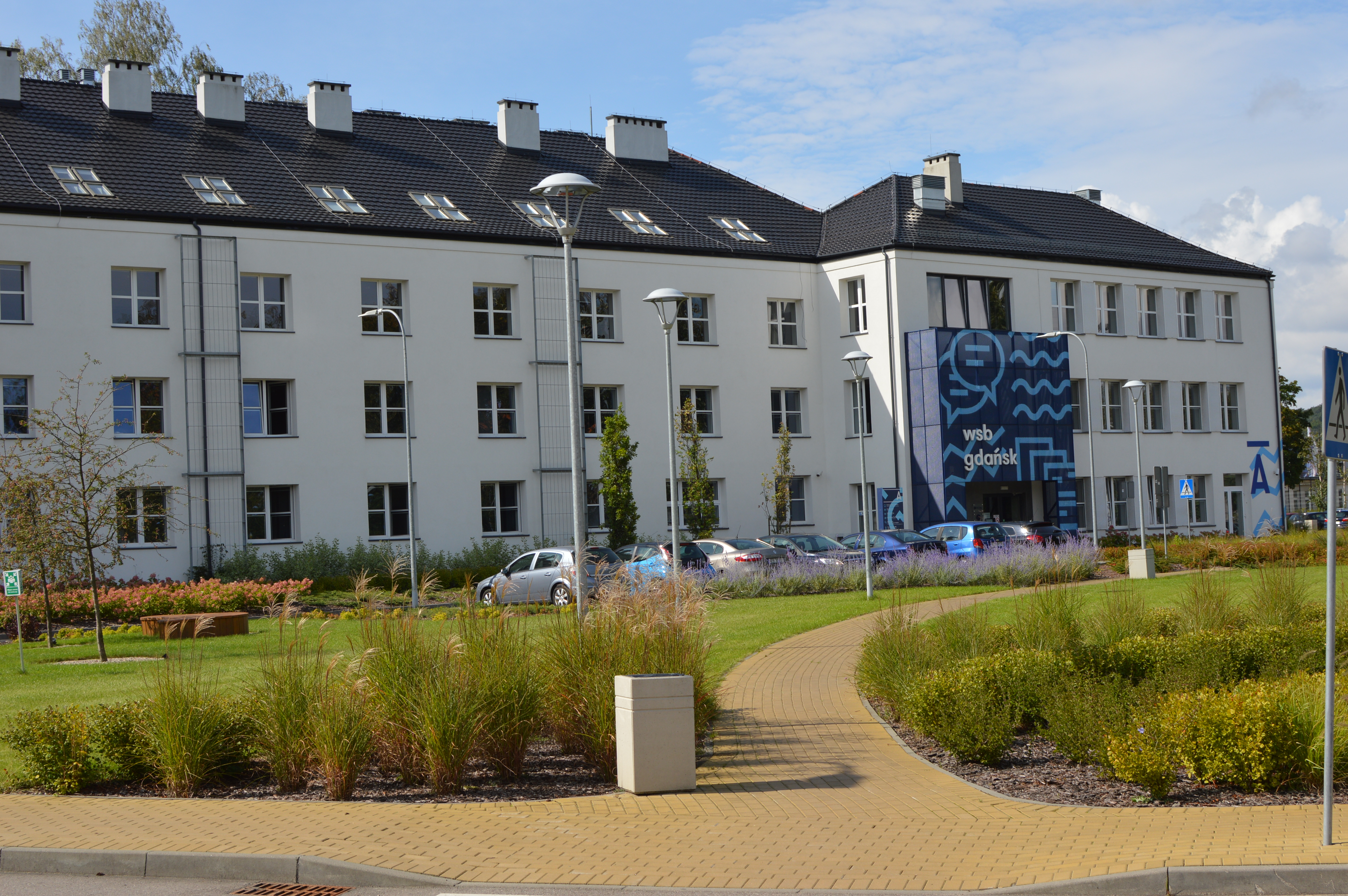
University campus in Gdańsk

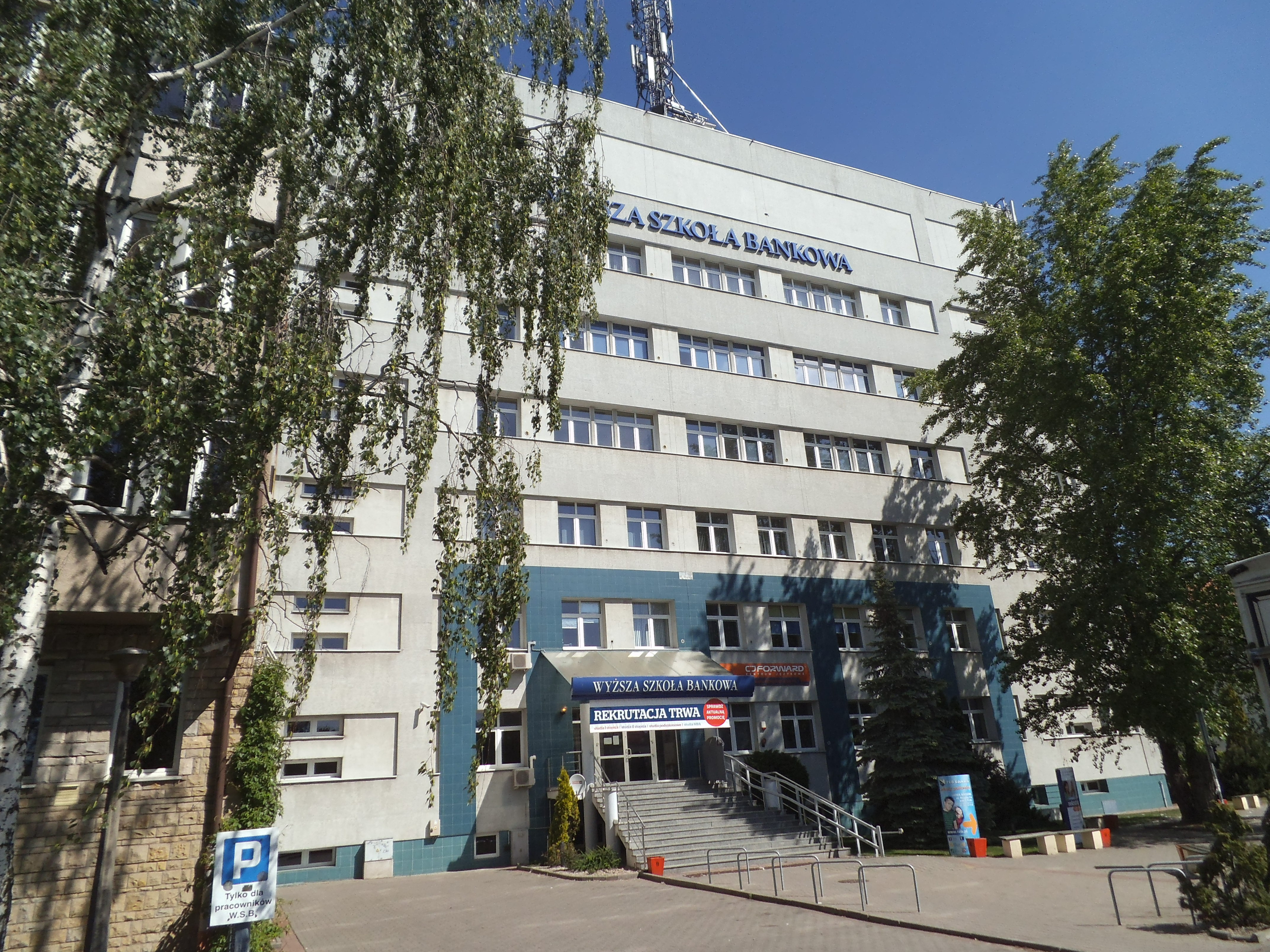
University campus in Toruń

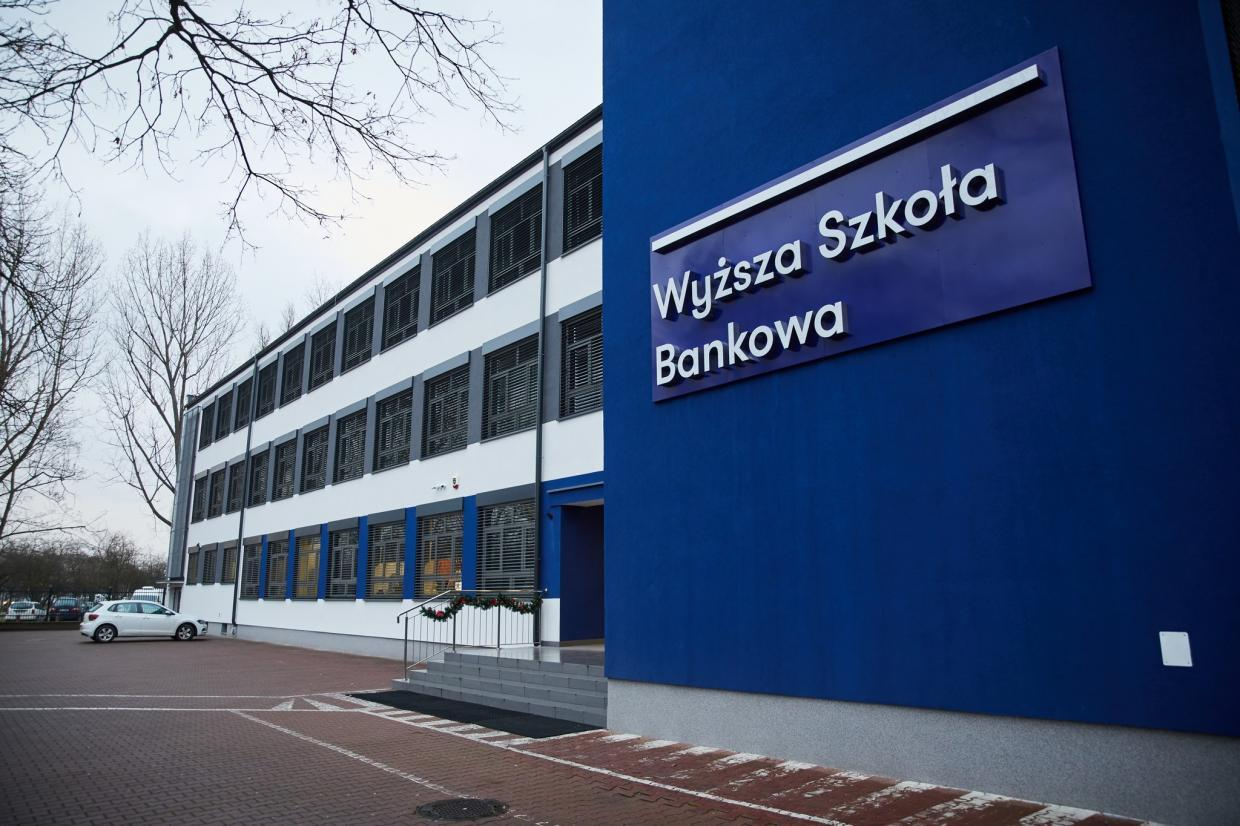
University campus in Warszaw

WSB Universities consists of 10 faculties (departments) in ten cities in Poland:

- WSB University in Bydgoszcz (Faculty of Finance and Management in Bydgoszcz)
  (pl. Wydział Finansów i Zarządzania w Bydgoszczy – dean: dr Karolina Marchelwska-Patyk)
- WSB University in Chorzów (Off-campus department in Chorzów)
  (pl. Wydział Zamiejscowy w Chorzowie – dean: dr Krzysztof Koj)
- WSB University in Gdańsk (Faculty of Finance and Management in Gdańsk)
  (pl. Wydział Finansów i Zarządzania – dean: prof. nadzw. dr inż. Irena Bach-Dąbrowska)
- WSB University in Gdynia (Faculty of Economics and Management in Gdynia)
  (pl. Wydział Ekonomii i Zarządzania w Gdyni – dean: prof. Artur Roland Kozłowski)
- WSB University in Opole (Faculty of Economics in Opole)
  (pl. Wydział Ekonomiczny w Opolu – dean: dr Katarzyna Mizera)
- WSB University in Poznań (Faculty of Finance and Banking in Poznań)
  (pl. Wydział Finansów i Bankowości w Poznaniu – dean: dr Roman Łosiński)
- WSB University in Szczecin (Faculty of Economics in Szczecin)
  (pl. Wydział Ekonomiczny w Szczecinie – dean: dr Andrzej Kokiel)
- WSB University in Toruń (Faculty of Finance and Management in Toruń)
  (pl. Wydział Finansów i Zarządzania w Toruniu – dean: dr Monika Wyrzykowska-Antkiewicz)
- WSB University in Warsaw (Faculty in Warsaw)
  (pl. Wydział w Warszawie) – dean: dr Agnieszka Nieznańska-Cwynar)
- WSB University in Wrocław (Faculty of Finance and Management in Wrocław)
  (pl. Wydział Finansów i Zarządzania we Wrocławiu) – dean: dr hab. Radosław Kamiński)

These departments are grouped into five teaching units:

- WSB Poznań, which also includes WSB Chorzów and WSB Szczecin
  (rector: prof. zw. dr hab. Józef Orczyk)
- WSB Wrocław, which also includes WSB Opole
  (rector: prof. dr hab. inż. Jacek Mercik)
- WSB Toruń, which also includes WSB Bydgoszcz
  (rector: prof. zw. dr hab. Marek Jacek Stankiewicz)
- WSB Gdańsk, which also includes WSB Gdynia
  (rector: prof. nadzw. dr hab. Jan Wiśniewski)
- WSB Warsaw
  (rector: dr hab. Ryszard Sowiński)

== Fields of study (education) ==
- First cycle (undergraduate/Bachelor's) studies:
  - Administration (Bydgoszcz, Gdańsk, Poznań, Warszawa)
  - Administration and Internal Security (Opole)
  - Cosmetology (Gdańsk)
  - Data Engineering (Gdańsk)
  - Design in Business (Bydgoszcz, Toruń)
  - Dietetics (Gdańsk)
  - Economics (Warszawa)
  - Film and Creative Media (Gdynia)
  - Finance and Accounting (Bydgoszcz, Chorzów/Katowice, Gdańsk, Gdynia, Opole, Poznań, Szczecin, Toruń, Warszawa, Wrocław)
  - Information Technology (Chorzów/Katowice, Gdańsk, Gdynia, Poznań, Szczecin, Warszawa, Wrocław)
  - Information Technology in Business (Bydgoszcz, Toruń)
  - Internal Security (Bydgoszcz, Gdańsk, Gdynia, Poznań, Toruń, Wrocław, Warszawa)
  - International Relations (Gdańsk)
  - International Trade (Poznań)
  - Law in Business (Chorzów/Katowice, Gdańsk, Opole, Poznań, Toruń, Warszawa, Wrocław)
  - Management (Bydgoszcz, Chorzów/Katowice, Gdańsk, Gdynia, Opole, Poznań, Szczecin, Toruń, Warszawa, Wrocław)
  - Marketing and Sales (Chorzów/Katowice, Szczecin)
  - Media and Business Communication (Opole)
  - Multimedia and Computer Graphics (Gdańsk)
  - National Security (Chorzów/Katowice)
  - Pedagogy (Bydgoszcz, Chorzów/Katowice, Gdańsk, Gdynia, Opole, Szczecin, Toruń, Warszawa)
  - Psychology in Business (Bydgoszcz, Chorzów/Katowice, Gdańsk, Gdynia, Poznań, Szczecin, Toruń, Warszawa)
  - Public Administration (Chorzów/Katowice)
  - Security in Business and Administration (Szczecin)
  - Tourism (Bydgoszcz)
  - Tourism and Recreation (Chorzów/Katowice, Gdańsk, Gdynia, Poznań, Szczecin, Toruń, Warszawa, Wrocław)
- First-cycle studies in English:
  - Business English (Chorzów/Katowice)
  - Computer Science (Poznań)
  - Engineering Management (Bydgoszcz, Poznań)
  - International Trade (Poznań)
  - IT in Business (Bydgoszcz, Toruń)
  - Management (Bydgoszcz, Poznań, Toruń)
  - Philology (Gdańsk, Gdynia, Poznań, Wrocław)
  - Tourism and Recreaction (Toruń)
- First-cycle studies (Engineering):
  - Information Technology (Chorzów/Katowice, Gdańsk, Gdynia, Poznań, Szczecin, Warszawa, Wrocław)
  - Information Technology in Business (Bydgoszcz, Toruń)
  - Logistics (Bydgoszcz, Chorzów/Katowice, Gdańsk, Gdynia, Opole, Poznań, Szczecin, Toruń, Warszawa, Wrocław)
  - Engineering Management (Bydgoszcz, Chorzów/Katowice, Gdańsk, Opole, Poznań, Szczecin, Toruń, Wrocław)
- Long-cycle Master's studies (5 years):
  - Pre-School and Early School Education (Gdańsk, Gdynia, Szczecin, Toruń)
  - Law (Gdańsk, Poznań, Wrocław)
  - Psychology (Bydgoszcz, Gdańsk, Toruń)
- Second cycle studies (Master's):
  - Administration (Warszawa)
  - Economics (Warszawa)
  - Finance and Accounting (Bydgoszcz, Choirzów/Katowice, Gdańsk, Opole, Poznań, Szczecin, Toruń, Warszawa, Wrocław)
  - Finance-Law Major (Bydgoszcz)
  - Information Technology (Gdańsk, Poznań)
  - Information Technology in Business (Bydgoszcz, Toruń)
  - Internal Security (Gdańsk)
  - Logistics: Engineer-Master studies (Bydgoszcz)
  - Logistics (Bydgoszcz, Gdańsk, Poznań, Szczecin, Toruń, Warszawa, Wrocław)
  - Management (Bydgoszcz, Chorzów / Katowice, Gdańsk, Gdynia, Opole, Poznań, Szczecin, Warszawa, Wrocław)
  - Engineering Management (Bydgoszcz, Toruń)
  - Management for Engineers (Chorzów / Katowice, Gdańsk, Poznań, Szczecin)
  - Management-Law Major (Toruń)
  - National Security (Chorzów / Katowice)
  - Online Management (Chorzów / Katowice, Opole, Poznań, Szczecin)
  - Pedagogy (Bydgoszcz, Chorzów / Katowice, Gdańsk, Opole, Szczecin, Toruń, Warszawa)
  - Psychology in Business (Poznań)
  - Tourism (Toruń)
  - Tourism and Recreation (Gdańsk, Poznań, Wrocław)
- Second-cycle studies in English:
  - Business Management (Poznań)
  - Information Technology in Business (Toruń)
  - Logistics (Bydgoszcz, Toruń)
  - Management (Bydgoszcz)
  - Management and Law (Toruń)
  - Management – the English-language path (Szczecin)
- Second-cycle studies with post-graduate programmes:
  - Administration (Warsaw)
  - Computer Science in Business (Bydgoszcz, Toruń)
  - Economics (Warszawa)
  - Finance and Accounting (Bydgoszcz, Chorzów / Katowice, Gdańsk, Poznań, Szczecin, Toruń, Wrocław)
  - Finance-Law Major (Bydgoszcz)
  - Internal Security (Gdańsk)
  - Logistics (Bydgoszcz, Gdańsk, Szczecin, Wrocław)
  - Management (Bydgoszcz, Chorzów / Katowice, Gdańsk, Gdynia, Opole, Poznań, Szczecin, Wrocław)
  - Management Engineering (Bydgoszcz, Toruń)
  - Managerial and Legal Major (Toruń)
  - National Security (Chorzów / Katowice)
  - Online Management (Chorzów / Katowice, Poznań, Szczecin)
  - Pedagogy (Bydgoszcz, Opole, Toruń)
  - Tourism (Toruń)
- postgraduate programmes – over 650 postgraduate fields of study
- MBA study programmes – studies for managerial staff:
  - Bydgoszcz: Master of Business Administration
  - Chorzów: Master of Business Administration, two majors to choose from: Management in International Business and Project Management
  - Gdańsk: Master of Business Administration, MBA Leadership
  - Opole: Master of Business Administration
  - Poznań: Executive MBA, Master of Business Administration
  - Szczecin: Master of Business Administration
  - Toruń: Master of Business Administration
  - Wrocław: Franklin University MBA, Master of Business Administration, Executive MBA – Project Management, Executive MBA – Business Trends
- Third-cycle studies (doctoral studies):
  - The Faculty of Finance and Banking of WSB University in Poznań – right to confer a Ph.D. in economic sciences, in the discipline of economics.
  - The Faculty of Finance and Management of WSB University in Gdańsk – right to confer a Ph.D. in economic sciences, in the discipline of management sciences.
  - The Faculty of Finance and Management of WSB University in Wrocław – right to confer a Ph.D. in economic sciences, in the discipline of economics.
- Additionally, WSB Universities offer specialties and majors subsidised from the European Union funds:
  - First-cycle subsidised studies at WSB Bydgoszcz, WSB Szczecin, WSB Toruń, WSB Warszawa
  - Second-cycle subsidised studies at WSB Bydgoszcz, WSB Poznań, WSB Toruń, WSB Warszawa

In 2009, the university began offering its MBA at the Franklin University in Ohio, United States.

== Rankings ==
In 2019, Perspektywy published a yearly prepared ranking of non-public universities in Poland.

The results of WSB Universities were as follows:

- WSB Poznań – 14th place
- WSB Gdańsk – 23rd place
- WSB Wrocław – 26th place
- WSB Toruń – 30th place.

In information about the results of recruitment for the academic year 2019/2020 published by the Ministry of Science and Higher Education, WSB Universities featured high in the list of the most frequently selected universities at first-cycle as well as long-cycle Master-level studies in Poland. WSB University in Poznań took the first position as the most frequently non-public local university. In addition, WSB Universities in Gdańsk, Toruń and Wrocław were indicated as the most popular in their regions. WSB University in Warszawa ended up among ten most-chosen non-public universities for part-time studies.

In ranking of Private Masters Degree Universities 2015 published by Perspektywy and Rzeczpospolita, WSB in Poznań ranked 15th, WSB in Wrocław ranked 18th, WSB in Gdańsk ranked 26th, WSB in Toruń in 30th place.

In ranking of Top Master of Business Administration (MBA) programs in Poland in 2016, WSB in Poznań with the Aalto Executive MBA program ranked 8th, WSB in Wrocław with the Franklin University MBA program (FUMBA) ranked 9th, WSB in Gdańsk ranked 14th, WSB in Toruń ranked 20th place.

WSB Universities was listed in various rankings by Wprost. In the general ranking of universities in 2015, WSB in Poznań ranked 19th, taking the place between SWPS University of Social Sciences and Humanities and the Adam Mickiewicz University in Poznań. Among 10 private universities most esteemed by employers, WSB in Poznań ranked in 3rd place. Among universities offering the fields of economics, finance, accounting and also management and marketing, WSB in Poznań ranked 8th in Poland.

== See also ==
- Warsaw School of Economics (Szkoła Główna Handlowa)
