= Saiq =

- Location in Oman
- Coordinates: 23°4′0″N 57°39′0″E
- Country: Oman
- Subdivision: Ad Dakhiliyah Region
- Elevation: 2,002 m (6,568 ft)

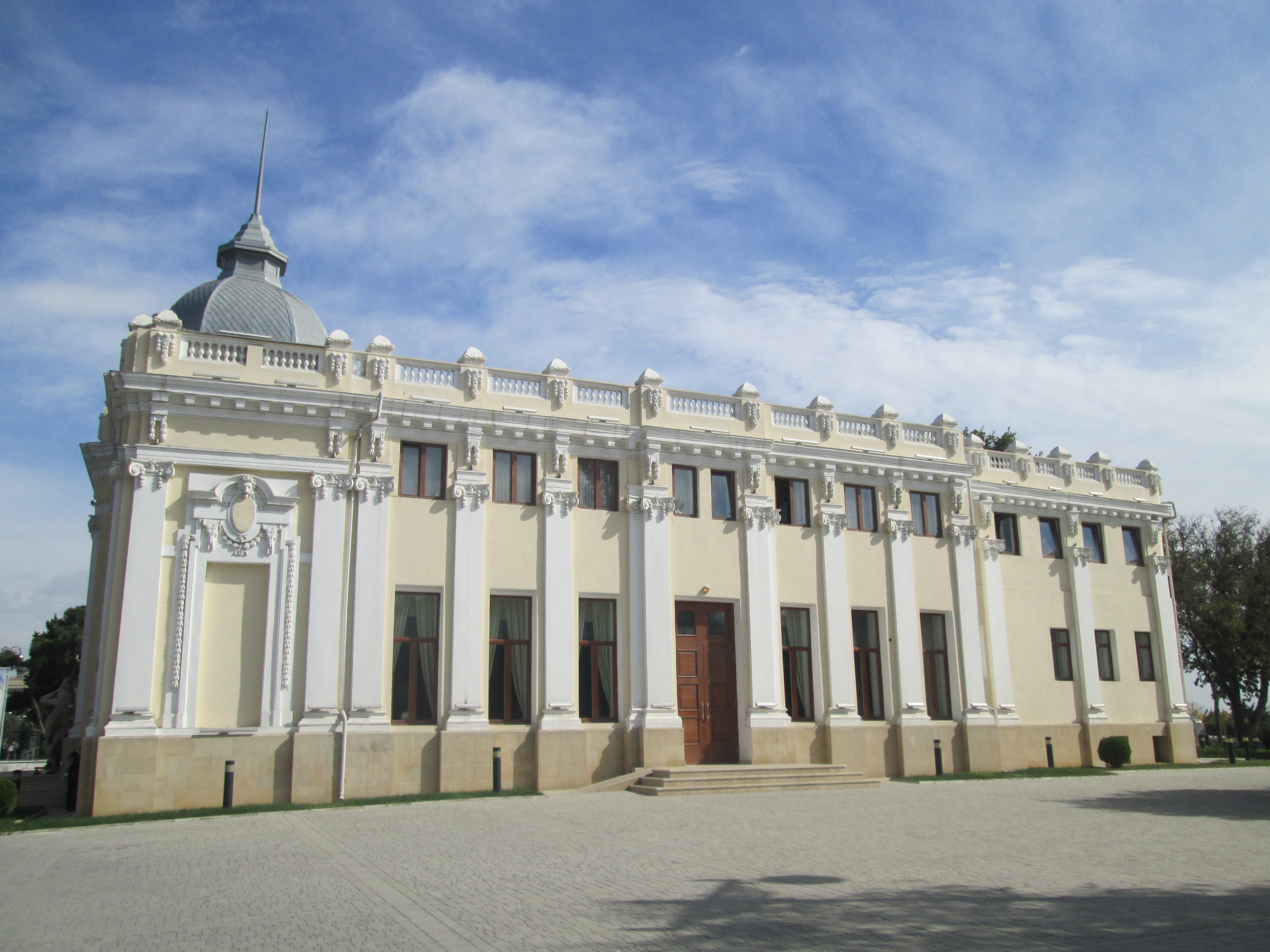
Abdulla Shaig State Puppet Theatre.

Saiq is a town in the region Ad Dakhiliyah, in northeastern Oman. It has its own airport, Saiq Airport.

== Climate ==
Saiq has a cold semi-arid climate (Köppen climate classification: BSk), with hot summers and cool winters. Precipitation is higher, and temperatures are lower, than in many other towns in Oman due to its high altitude in the Al Hajar Mountains. The highest temperature recorded in Saiq is 40.4 °C (104.7 °F), recorded on 5 July 2008, and the lowest temperature is −3.6 °C (25.5 °F), recorded on January 26, 1983.

Climate data for Saiq
| Month | Jan | Feb | Mar | Apr | May | Jun | Jul | Aug | Sep | Oct | Nov | Dec | Year |
|---|---|---|---|---|---|---|---|---|---|---|---|---|---|
| Record high °C (°F) | 26.0 (78.8) | 26.5 (79.7) | 26.1 (79.0) | 29.8 (85.6) | 34.5 (94.1) | 35.4 (95.7) | 40.4 (104.7) | 37.1 (98.8) | 32.2 (90.0) | 32.5 (90.5) | 28.5 (83.3) | 23.3 (73.9) | 40.4 (104.7) |
| Mean daily maximum °C (°F) | 12.0 (53.6) | 13.5 (56.3) | 16.9 (62.4) | 20.8 (69.4) | 24.7 (76.5) | 27.6 (81.7) | 27.3 (81.1) | 26.4 (79.5) | 24.0 (75.2) | 20.5 (68.9) | 16.1 (61.0) | 12.9 (55.2) | 20.2 (68.4) |
| Daily mean °C (°F) | 7.8 (46.0) | 9.9 (49.8) | 13.2 (55.8) | 16.8 (62.2) | 20.6 (69.1) | 23.5 (74.3) | 23.5 (74.3) | 22.7 (72.9) | 20.2 (68.4) | 16.5 (61.7) | 11.6 (52.9) | 8.9 (48.0) | 16.3 (61.3) |
| Mean daily minimum °C (°F) | 3.7 (38.7) | 6.4 (43.5) | 9.5 (49.1) | 12.9 (55.2) | 16.5 (61.7) | 19.4 (66.9) | 19.8 (67.6) | 19.0 (66.2) | 16.4 (61.5) | 12.5 (54.5) | 7.2 (45.0) | 4.9 (40.8) | 12.4 (54.2) |
| Record low °C (°F) | −3.6 (25.5) | −3.0 (26.6) | 0.1 (32.2) | 2.3 (36.1) | 5.3 (41.5) | 10.2 (50.4) | 11.0 (51.8) | 10.6 (51.1) | 9.4 (48.9) | 5.2 (41.4) | −1.2 (29.8) | −3.6 (25.5) | −3.6 (25.5) |
| Average precipitation mm (inches) | 6.2 (0.24) | 60.1 (2.37) | 51.9 (2.04) | 32.6 (1.28) | 26.2 (1.03) | 13.0 (0.51) | 37.2 (1.46) | 51.2 (2.02) | 18.6 (0.73) | 1.6 (0.06) | 5.8 (0.23) | 11.7 (0.46) | 316.1 (12.43) |
| Average precipitation days (≥ 1 mm) | 1.2 | 1.2 | 2.1 | 1.9 | 2.1 | 1.2 | 3.4 | 5 | 2.1 | 1.9 | 1 | 1.1 | 24.2 |
| Average relative humidity (%) | 52 | 58 | 45 | 41 | 31 | 27 | 41 | 37 | 38 | 35 | 47 | 59 | 43 |
Source 1: NOAA (extremes since 1983)
Source 2: Tutiempo.net (July and August maximum) Deutscher Wetterdienst (precipitation days 2004-2019)
