= Shinas =

- Town
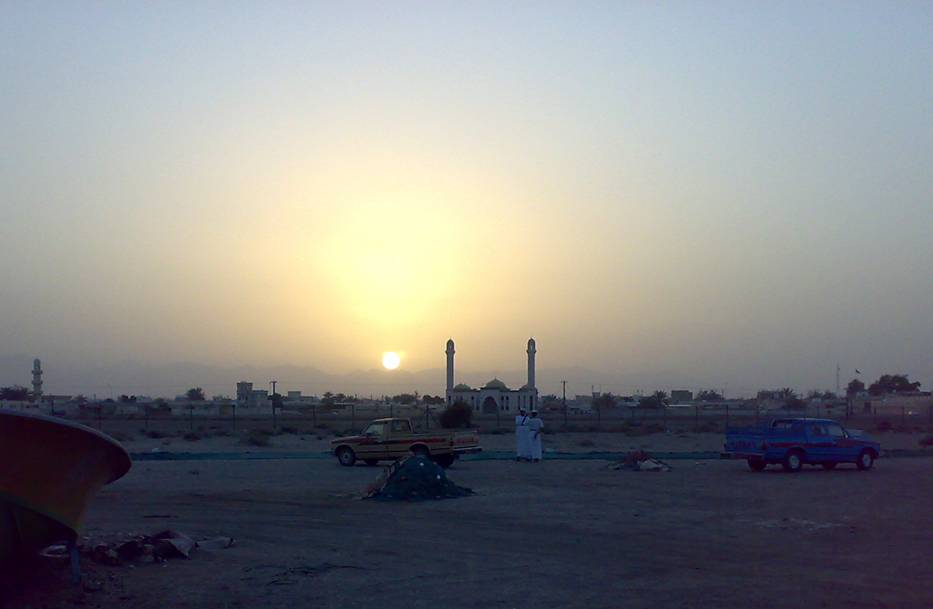

- Location in Oman
- Coordinates: 24°45′N 56°28′E
- Country: Oman
- Region: Al Batinah Region

Population (2005)
  - Total: 43,312
- Time zone: UTC+4 (Oman Standard Time)

Shinas (شناص in Arabic) is one of the six coastal wilayas in the Northern Al Batinah governorate, Oman, near its border with the United Arab Emirates. As of 2023, it had a population of 53,949.

== Gallery ==
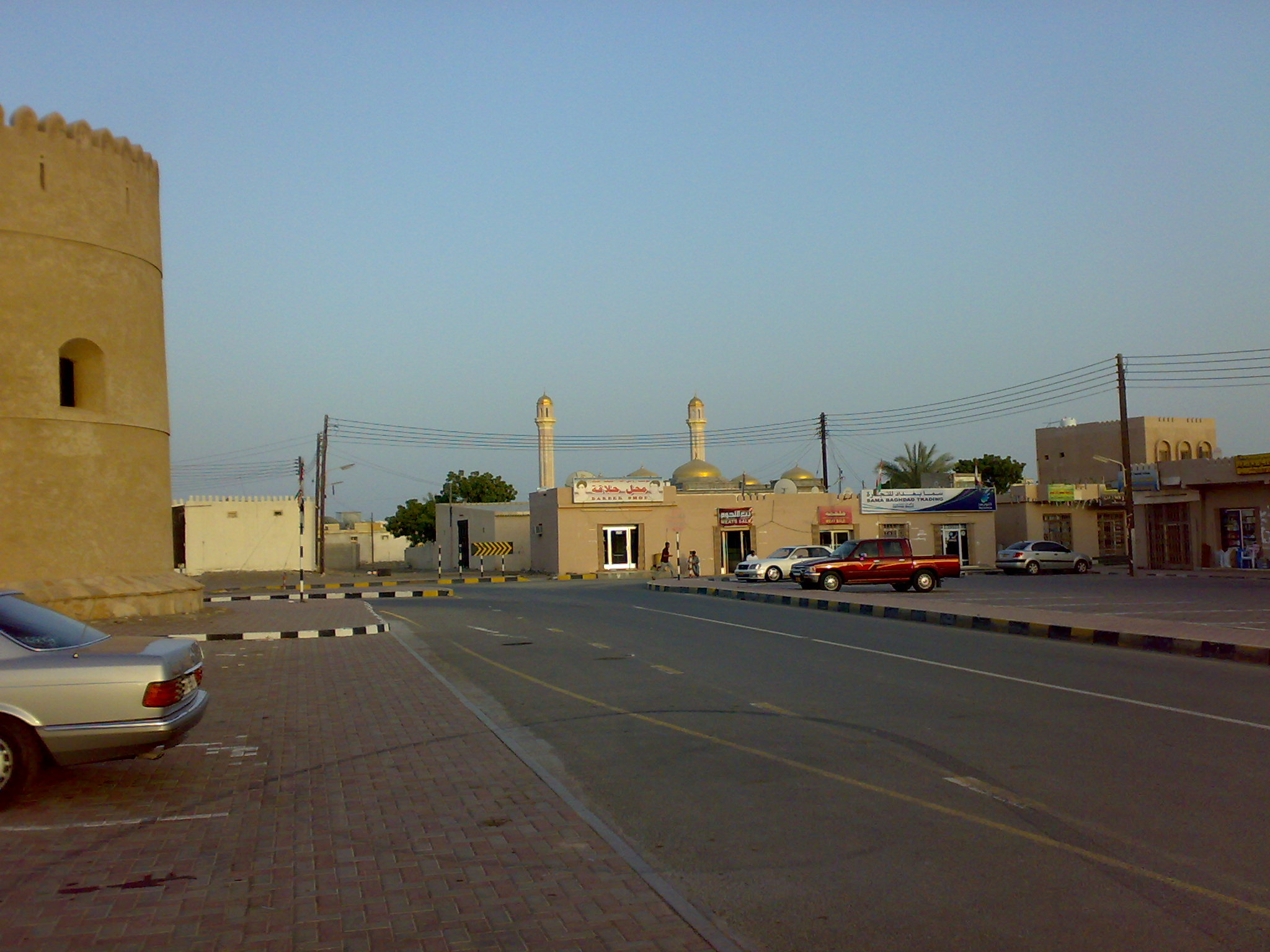

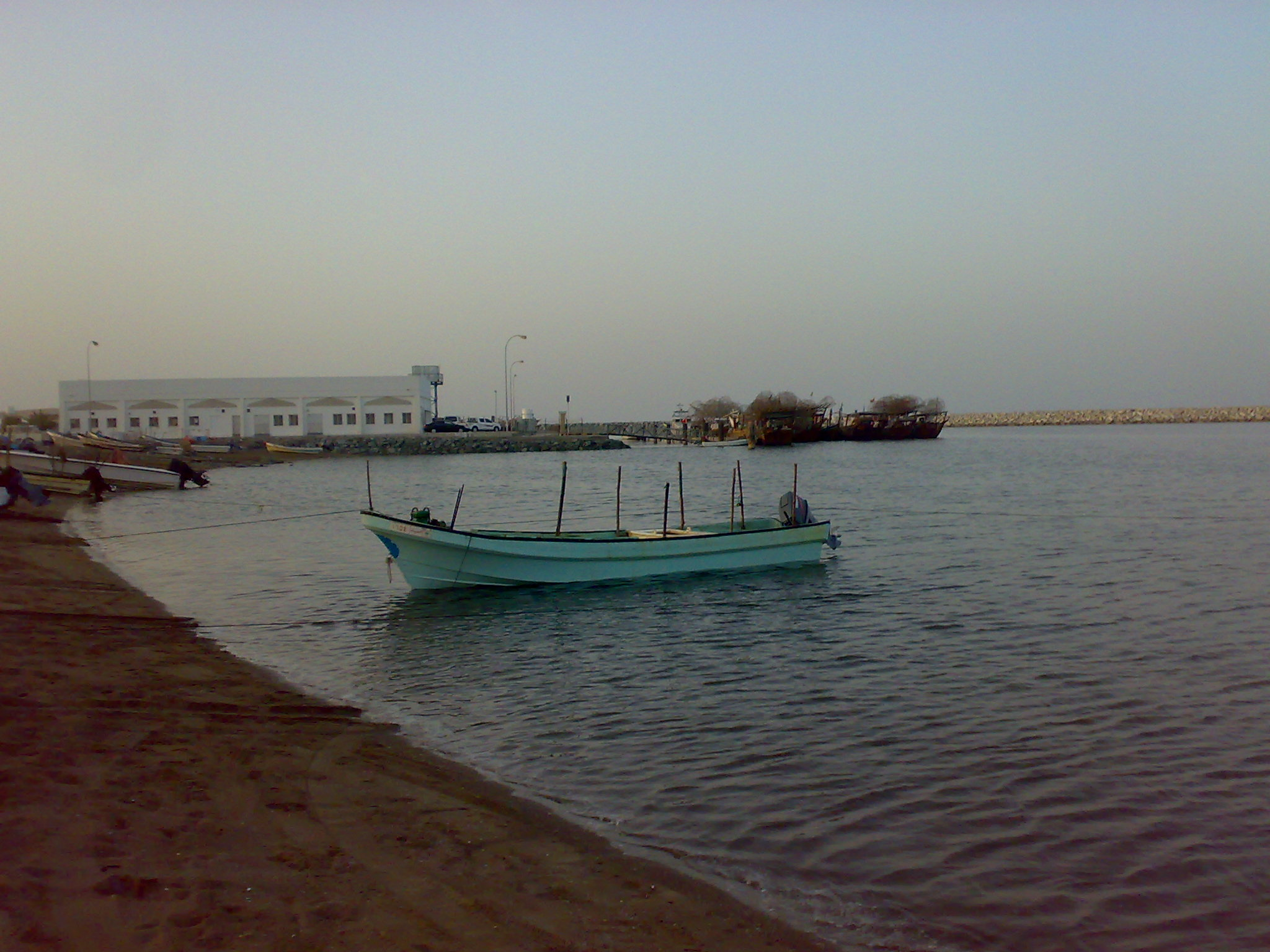

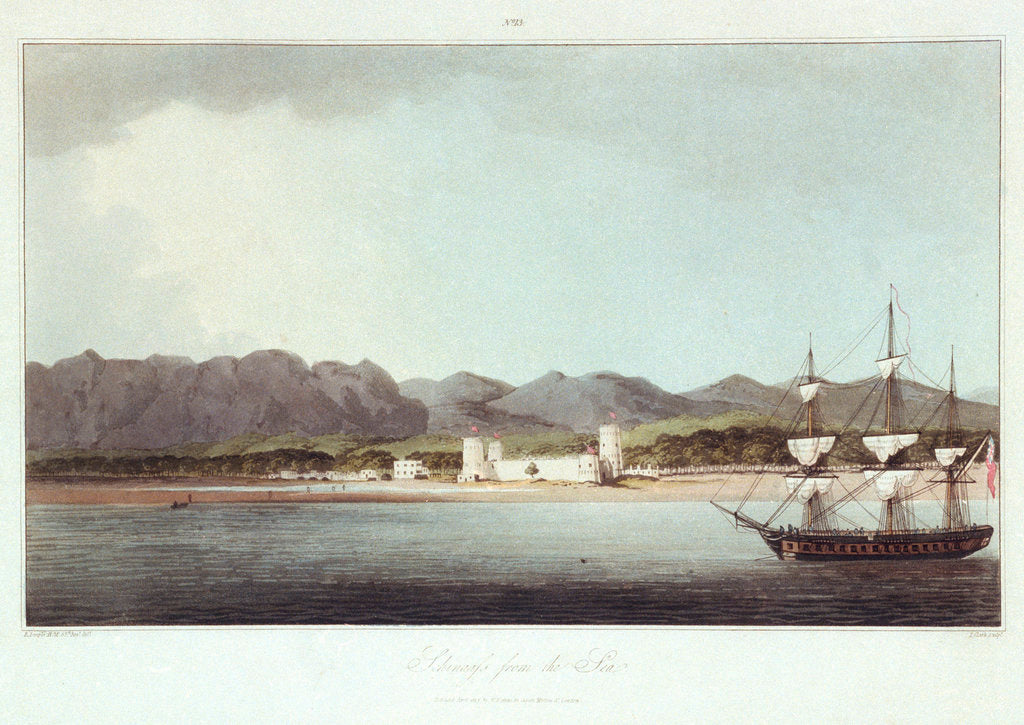
Shinas from the sea in 1810, a pirate stronghold on the Straits of Hormuz, as drawn by Lieut. Richard Temple

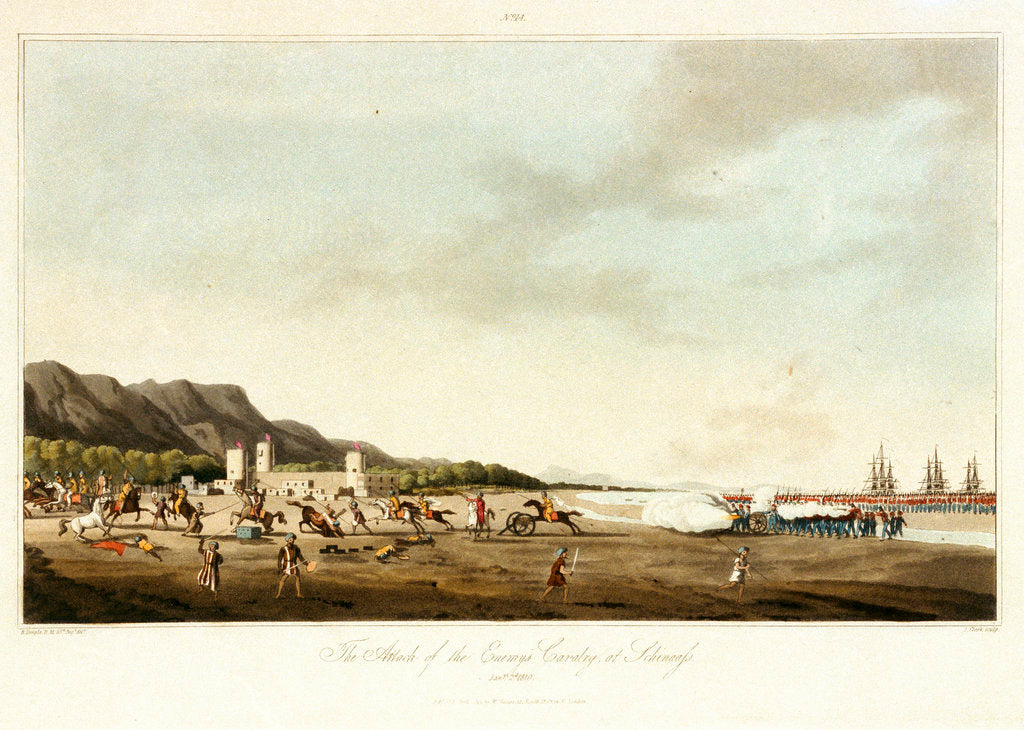
The pirate's cavalry attack the British at Shinas, 2 January 1810

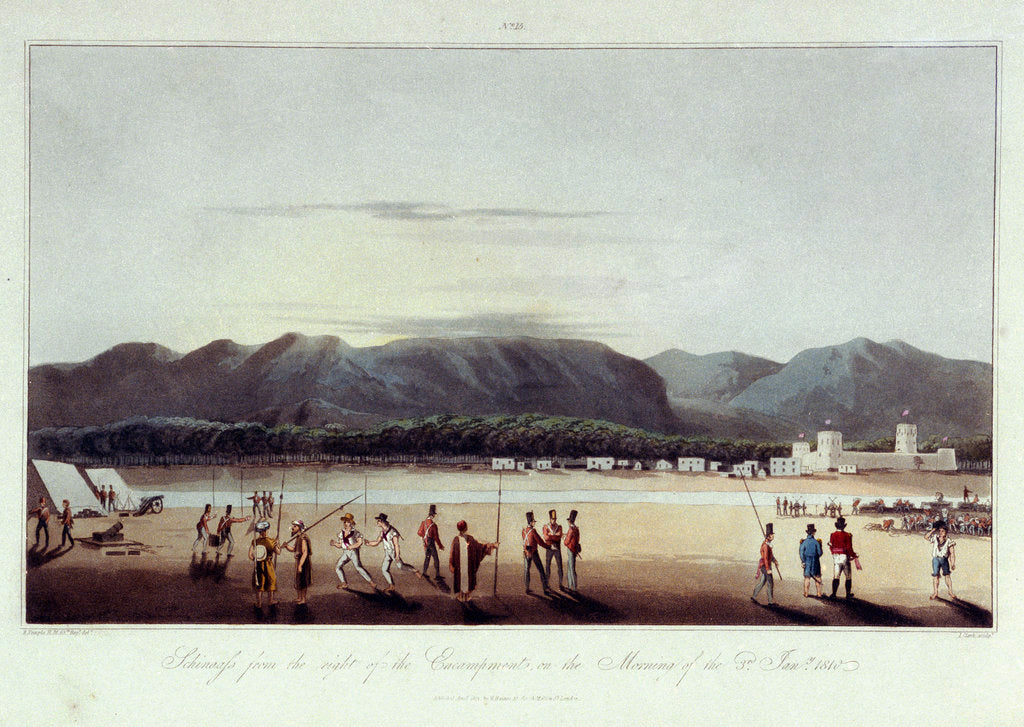
Shinas, on the morning of 3 January 1810.

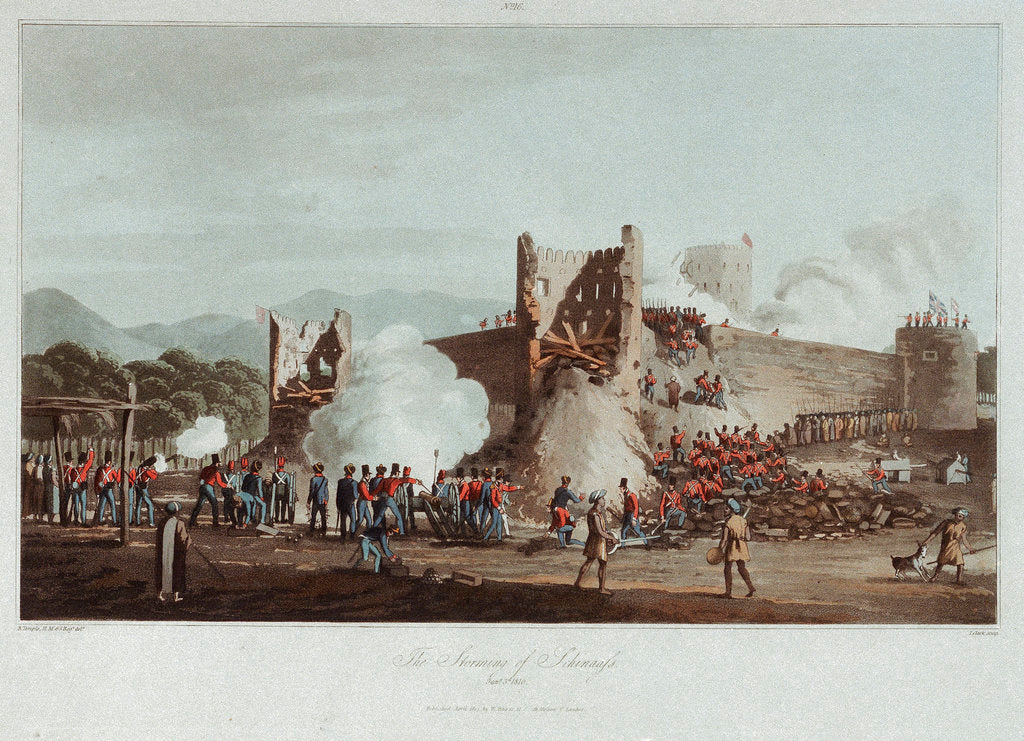
The British subsequently storming Shinas the same day.

== See also ==
- List of cities in Oman
