= Ibra =

- Town
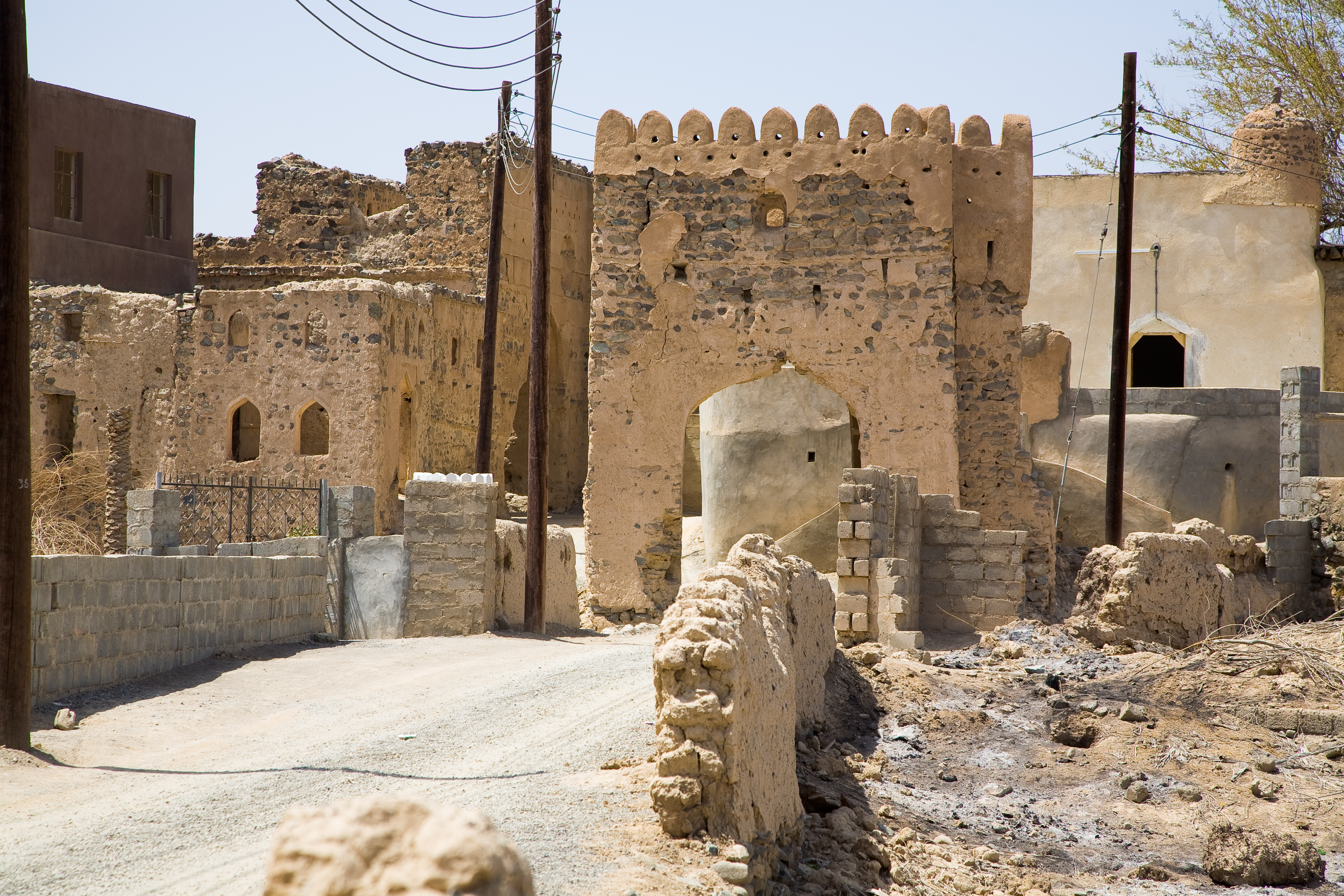

- Location in Oman
- Coordinates: 22°41′N 58°33′E
- Country: Oman
- Region: Ash Sharqiyah Region

Population (2008)
  - Total: 35,000
- Time zone: UTC+4 (Oman Standard Time)

Ibra (Arabic: ابراء) is the second largest city in the Ash Sharqiyah Region of Oman. It is located about 170 km (2 hours) from Muscat and has a population estimated at 55,000 people. Ibra is one of the oldest cities in Oman and was once a centre of trade, religion, education and art. The city acquired its importance as an important meeting point at the base of the Ash Sharqiya.

Ibra is home of the Al ismaili, Al Harthy, Al Maskari, Al Mughairi And Al Riyami tribes, some of the biggest tribes in Oman, and all of which are very prevalent in Ibra. Sheikh Saif bin Hashil Al-Maskari is one of the most prominent Sheikhs of Ibra. Sheikh Saif bin Hashil Al-Maskari is among the biggest businessmen in Oman, he has invested heavily in improving Ibra and its infrastructure. Sheikh Saif was also a former GCC Assistant Secretary-General for Political Affairs and Ibra is his tribal home town.

== Etymology ==
Historians do not agree on the origins of the name of the city. Some suggest it is derived from the Arabic verb (Arabic: ابراء للذنب) which means a purification of guilt.

== History ==
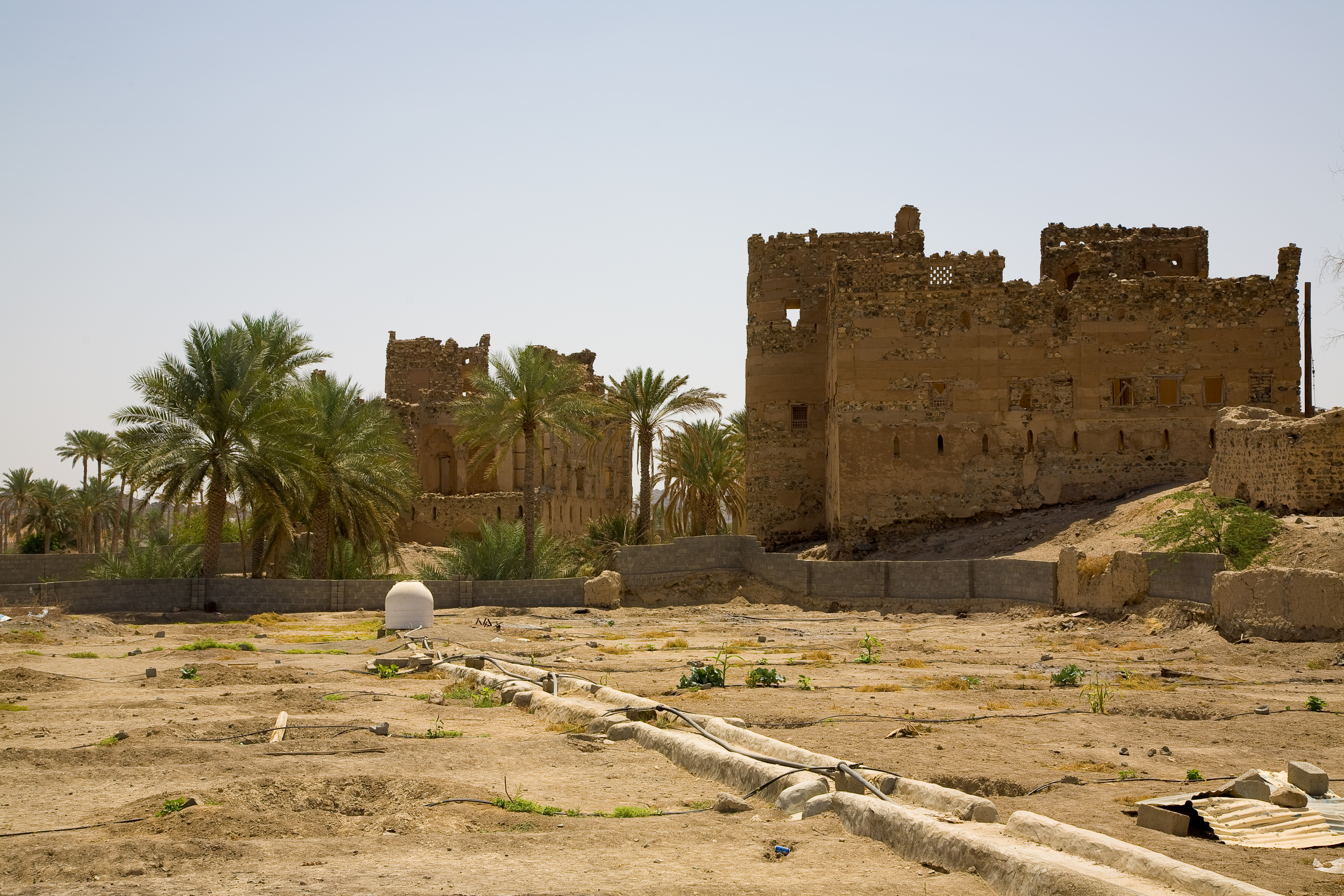

Ibra predates the Prophet Muhammed's calling. The city contains many castles and old mosques.

Ibra has become a more modern city since 1970 under the reign of Sultan Qaboos. Improvements include connections to Muscat via a three-lane highway, which has increased tourism. Communications have been improved to include broadband access, and there is now a substantial hospital. Ibra provides three choices of higher education: Ibra College of Technology, Ibra Nursing Institute, and beginning in the fall of 2010, A’Sharqiyah University. There are now two hotels in Ibra, and tourism is promoted in the area.

== Geography ==
Ibra has a hot desert climate (Köppen climate classification: BWh). Mountains surround Ibra on every side, and there is some outstanding mountain scenery close by. From November to March, the climate is relatively cool, with temperatures dropping as low as 10 °C (50 °F) in December. In the summer, the climate is hot and dry, with temperatures reaching 50 °C (122 °F) in July. Precipitation is very low and occurs mostly in the winter, when masses of low pressure air cause rain to fall.

Climate data for Ibra, elevation 469 m (1,539 ft), (1991–2020 normals, extremes 2002–2023)
Month	Jan	Feb	Mar	Apr	May	Jun	Jul	Aug	Sep	Oct	Nov	Dec	Year
Record high °C (°F)	32.4 (90.3)	36.1 (97.0)	40.8 (105.4)	42.5 (108.5)	48.2 (118.8)	48.4 (119.1)	48.4 (119.1)	46.4 (115.5)	45.1 (113.2)	41.6 (106.9)	36.7 (98.1)	34.9 (94.8)	48.4 (119.1)
Mean daily maximum °C (°F)	26.3 (79.3)	28.9 (84.0)	32.8 (91.0)	37.5 (99.5)	41.1 (106.0)	43.0 (109.4)	42.6 (108.7)	41.8 (107.2)	39.9 (103.8)	36.5 (97.7)	31.3 (88.3)	27.9 (82.2)	35.8 (96.4)
Daily mean °C (°F)	19.9 (67.8)	22.0 (71.6)	25.5 (77.9)	30.2 (86.4)	33.6 (92.5)	35.1 (95.2)	34.5 (94.1)	33.4 (92.1)	31.9 (89.4)	29.1 (84.4)	24.7 (76.5)	21.3 (70.3)	28.4 (83.2)
Mean daily minimum °C (°F)	13.2 (55.8)	15.0 (59.0)	18.0 (64.4)	22.5 (72.5)	26.0 (78.8)	27.7 (81.9)	27.7 (81.9)	26.7 (80.1)	24.9 (76.8)	21.7 (71.1)	18.1 (64.6)	14.7 (58.5)	21.3 (70.5)
Record low °C (°F)	6.3 (43.3)	4.5 (40.1)	10.7 (51.3)	16.0 (60.8)	21.0 (69.8)	23.2 (73.8)	23.0 (73.4)	20.4 (68.7)	20.6 (69.1)	15.1 (59.2)	12.7 (54.9)	8.5 (47.3)	4.5 (40.1)
Average precipitation mm (inches)	1.0 (0.04)	16.0 (0.63)	19.6 (0.77)	14.4 (0.57)	2.9 (0.11)	16.0 (0.63)	12.2 (0.48)	10.9 (0.43)	11.8 (0.46)	0.9 (0.04)	2.6 (0.10)	9.2 (0.36)	117.5 (4.62)
Source 1: World Meteorological Organization (precipitation 1998–2009)
Source 2: Starlings Roost Weather

== Ibra College of Technology ==
Ibra College of Technology (ICT) is one of the seven Colleges of Technology under the Ministry of Manpower (MoMP). The college is fully funded by the government to cater to the higher educational needs of Omani nationals as full-time students. It has been established to provide technological education for post secondary students leading to Certificate, Diploma and Higher Diploma in the fields of Business, Information Technology, and Engineering. To date, ICT plays a leading role in the educational, cultural and social development of the region.

== Attractions ==
The main tourist attractions in the city are its many beautiful watchtowers, the traditional Souq, and Falaj AlAfrit. The design of the souq complements the fort in every way. The Bait al Kabir was built in 1650 during the Ya'riba Dynasty. It once stood as a centre of Government in Ibra.

=== Ibra Souq ===
The city, famous for its handicrafts and agricultural products, has an expansive souq showcasing an array of products. It is one of the most important in the country besides Muttrah. The souq bustles with vendors selling everything from meat, fish, fruits and vegetables to spices, dates, gold and silverware. Ibra is renowned for its silver jewelry which is considered to be the best in the country. Halwa (a traditional Omani dessert) is also sold in the souq. Halwa is a sticky dessert made from sugar and spices and flavoured with sesame seeds or almonds. Ibra souq is the only souq in the country to have a whole day just for women.

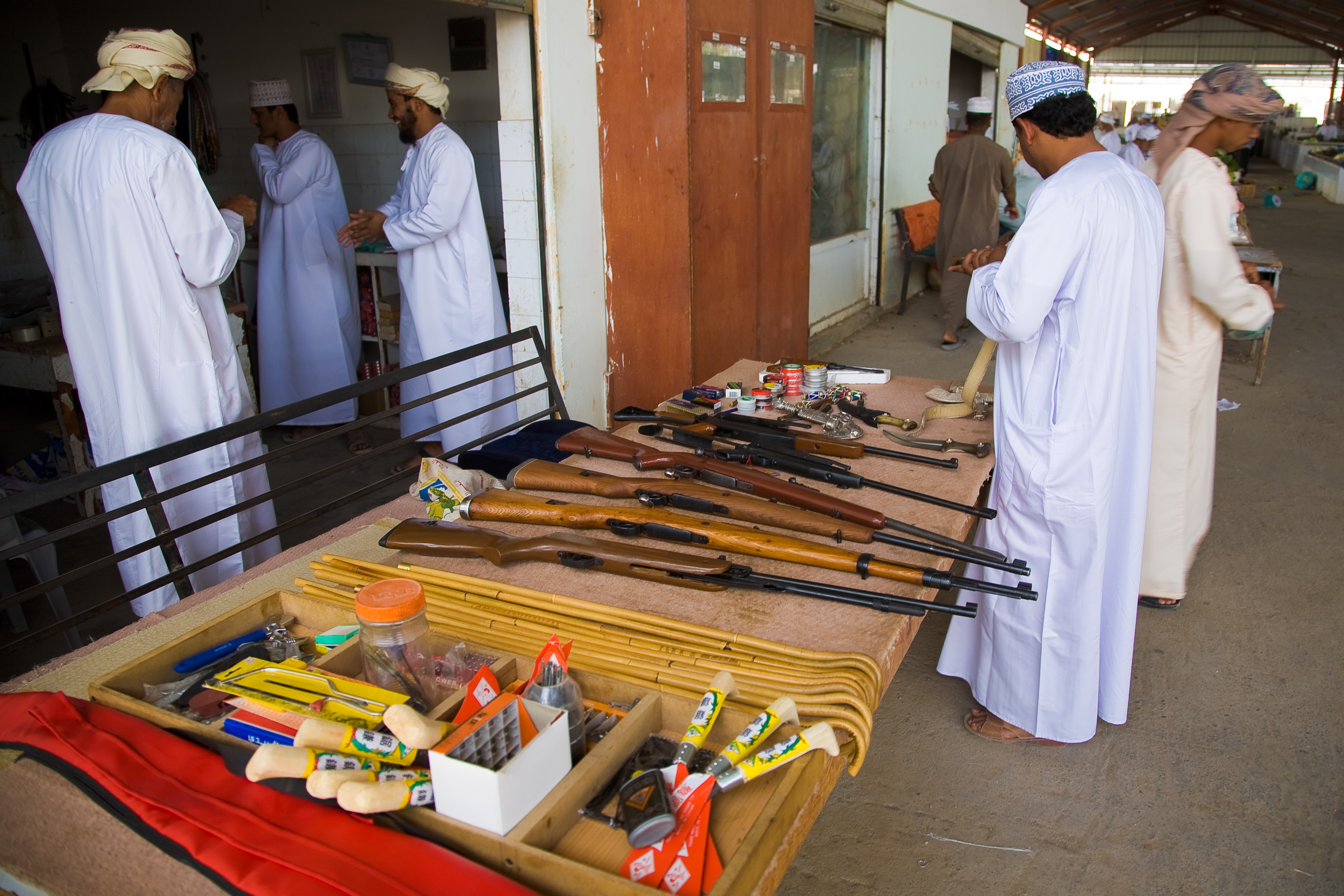

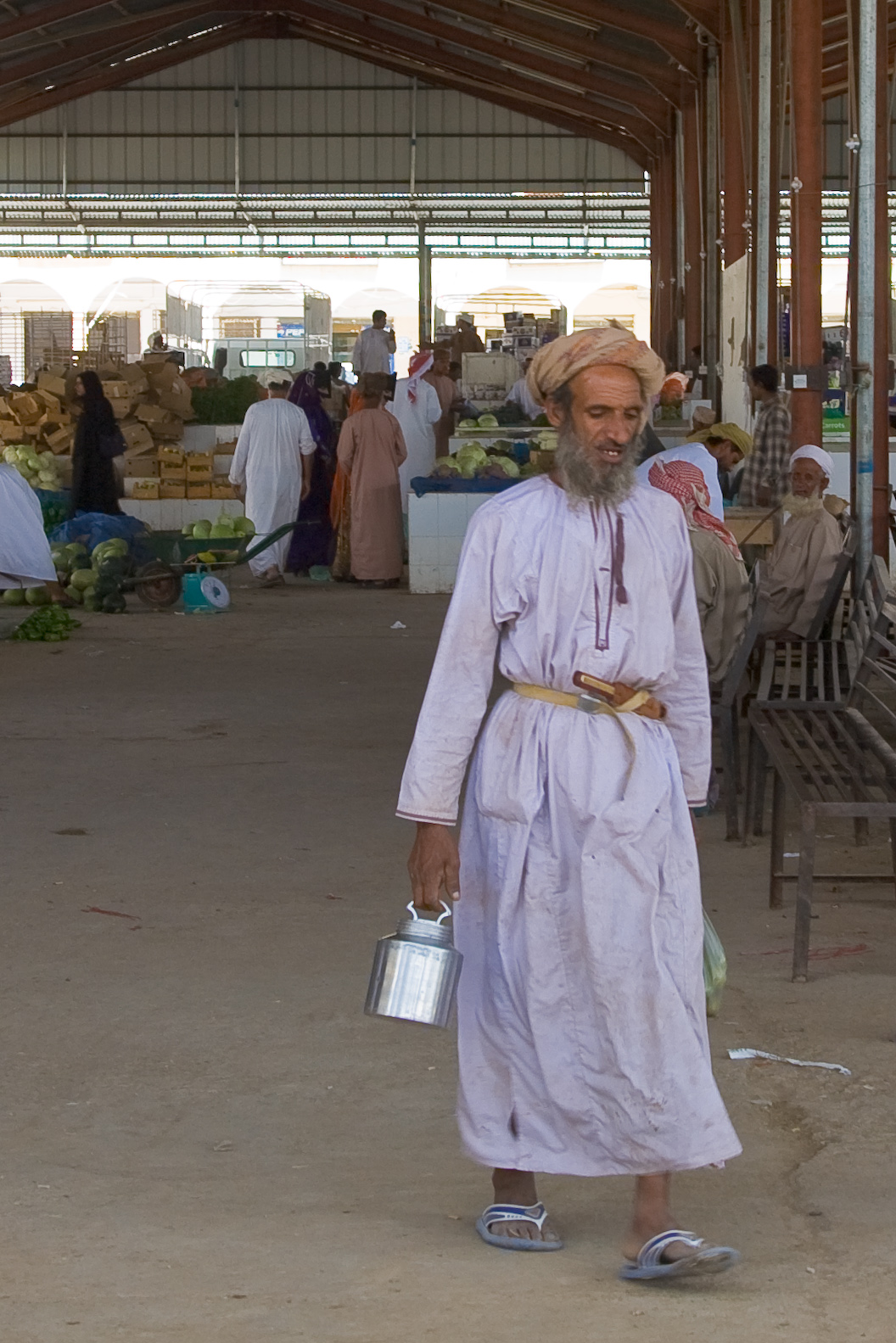

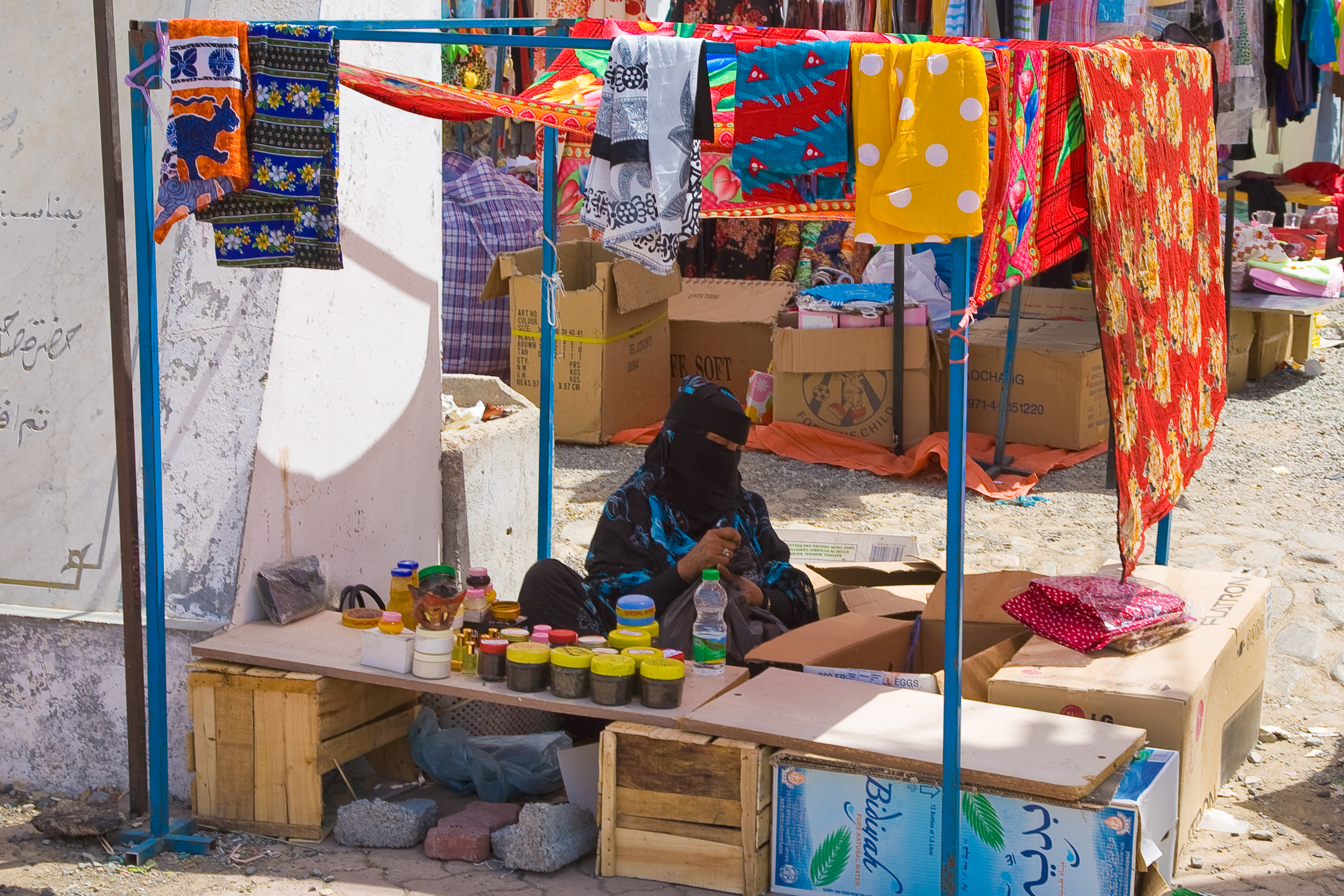

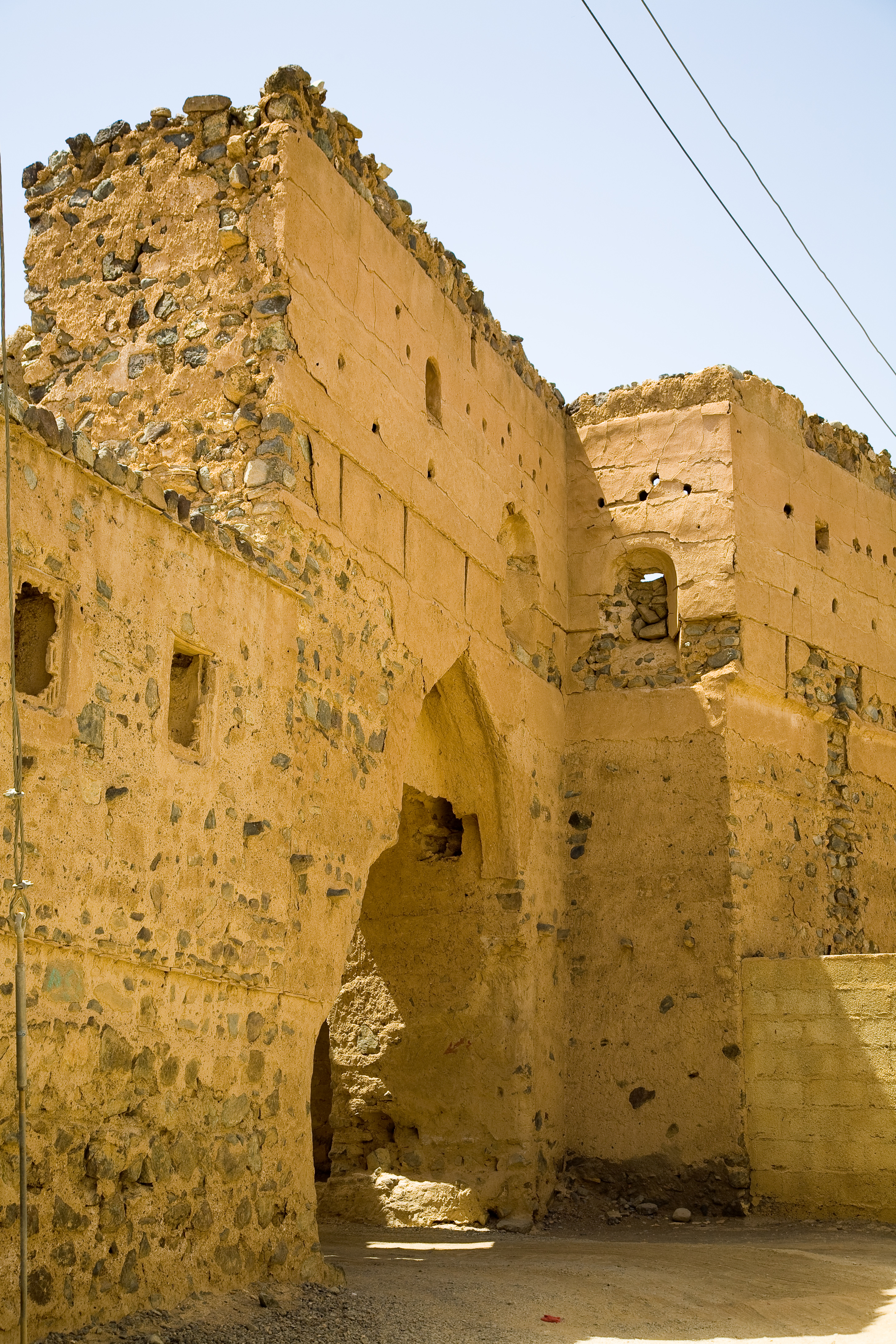

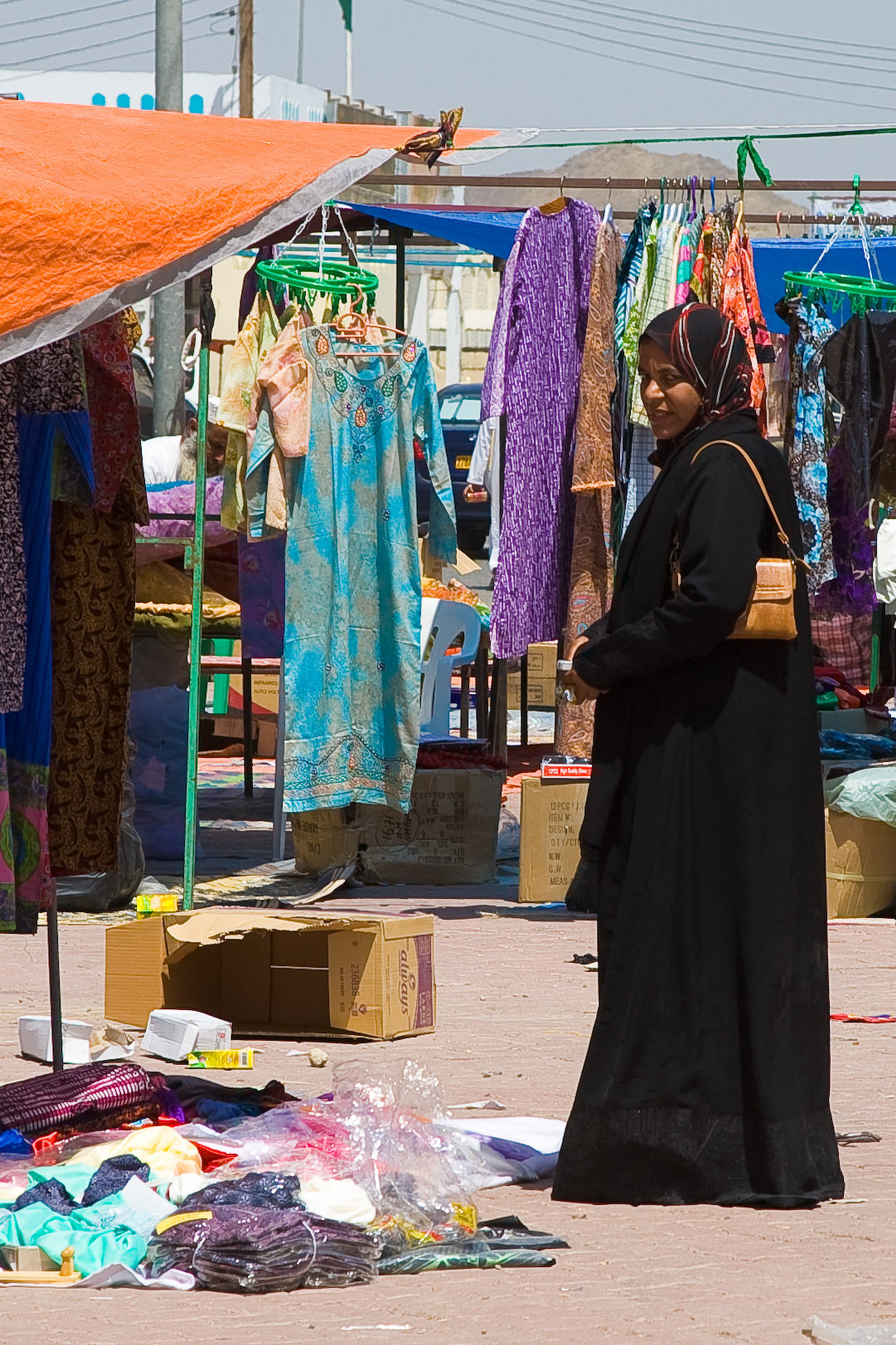

== Heritage and culture ==
=== Horses and camels ===
The state of Ibra is famous for preserving the ancient heritage, as the event (Running Al-Ardha) is held in the state on occasions, holidays and weddings. He shows some skills that distinguish him from other rugby players, such as standing on the back of a camel or holding hands with his other teammate. The event also witnesses camel owners decorating their participating camels with special equipment (such as the corsage, the saddlebag, the jaed, the silver tuft, the new khutam and the tuft, and the red zana embellished with hand weaving). The Ardha run includes the presentation of a number of traditional Omani songs, such as the art of “Al-Himbal”, “Al-Taghrood”, “Al-Wana” and others, and reciting poems.

Al-Ardha running fields are distributed in Al-Yahmadi, Al-Thabti and Merkad of the state located in the Al-Lama’a area, north of Al-Lama’a sports team and behind Al-Albab Basic Education School. Equestrian races are also held in the state. The “Zad Al-Rakeb” field located in Seih Al-Hamdi is the field previously approved by the Equestrian Committee to hold annual horse races. .

Daoun industry (old houses built of palm fronds).

The running of purebred Arabian camels is considered one of the inherited Omani customs, and it is still preserved by Omanis in many states of the Sultanate, and it attracts many citizens and tourists to follow its competitions.

=== Crafts and traditional industries ===
Traditional crafts and industries vary in the Wilayat of Ibra, the most important of which are weaving, especially weaving traditional Omani clothing, spinning from sheep’s wool, crafting daggers and women’s ornaments, making dauns from palm fronds (i.e. building the house from the whole of the palm tree), ropes, sumim, date envelopes, and tanning Leather and shoe industry. Among the industries are drying dates, nuts and drying lemons, palm fronds and palm leaves, and traditional leather. Among the most important arts: Al-Razha, Al-Qasafiyah, Al-Himbal, Al-Azi, and Al-Tashah. The state is famous for a number of agricultural products, most notably: Omani mangoes, bananas, grapes, dates and vegetables.

The village of Seih Al-Afia is also famous for many crafts, including traditional handicrafts such as sword and Omani sewing, as well as the profession of grazing sheep and cows and agriculture. To the shoulders of oxen that move and rotate, and because of the fertility of the land, agricultural crops varied, the most important of which are fifa trees, mangoes, palm trees, and dates, in addition to lemon, lettuce, guava, and sweet pepper. The village is distinguished by the dates of Al-Negal, Al-Hilali, Al-Khunaizi, Al-Mabsali, Al-Madlouki, and others. The residents of the village of Seih Al-Afia used some types of dates, such as Madloki and Al-Mabsali, to make Al-Fagour, which is a process for cooking unripe dates. This process produces light dates with a strong, delicious sugary taste. The process of cooking al-Fagur is done by placing large amounts of dates with water in a large saucepan (a wide basin with a small opening that allows heat to escape and a stove under it) and leave for 4 hours.

=== Musical arts and traditional games ===
The residents of the wilaya practice many musical arts, such as the art of al-Razha, which is an ancient art spread in all governorates of the Sultanate. It is performed by men in most national celebrations and occasions such as marriage occasions and others. It is done by men standing in equal rows, then some of them advance to fencing with swords and shields as an expression of courage and pride. It was received in This occasion notice and words with the use of the Omani drum. The state is also famous for other musical arts, such as the art of al-Azi, which is characterized by the strength of the performer’s voice, as it is performed through non-harmonious poems or singing in praise and pride, in addition to the arts of vulgarity, rhyme, tashah shah, al-Taghrood, al-Tareq, al-Wanah, al-Midan, al-Zar and al-Hadi.

One of the games that is still practiced is Al-Huwailis, which is dividing the sand into 9 sections (pits), then each player throws pebbles at the place of digging, and there is also the game of amber, which is about two competing teams and an empty bottle is placed in the middle and filled with dirt, and it is a game that is still practiced today From two teams, the first team catches the ball on both sides and passes it between them, while the second team is in the middle to avoid being hit by the ball.

=== Education ===
The state, especially the village of Seih Al-Afia, was famous for the presence of the old sabila, which is a place for the villagers to gather to attend mourning and hold the Quran. His wife, Saada bint Saeed Al-Sinawi, helped him in this, and many of the villagers received education from her after Hammoud’s death. Also, the grandmother, Moza bin Humaid Al-Harithiya, was famous in the science of legal spelling. In the village of Seih Al-Afia, there is also a school in Seih Al-Afia for basic education for girls from the fifth to the ninth grade.

== Books and authors ==
Book: Al-Manzafah: Its Ancient Houses and Biographies of Its Notables” by Yaqoub bin Saeed bin Yahya Al-Barwani (2017)

Memories of Seih Al-Afia website for writer Abdullah Al-Sinawi (6/12/2022)

The research of the student Al-Khattab bin Salem bin Ali Al-Harthy (2022) and the student Nasser bin Hammoud bin Nasser Al-Sinawi (2020)

== See also ==
- List of cities in Oman
