= Distributor roads in Oman =

Distributor Roads in Oman

System information
- Length: 4,070 km (2,530 mi)
- Formed: December 18, 2019; 6 years ago

Highway names
- Distributor Roads: Dxxx

System links
- Transport in Oman

Distributor roads in Oman are the fourth category of road in the Omani route numbering system and are designated with route numbers beginning with "D".

The distributor road system was established on December 18, 2019, by the Ministry of Transport (now the Ministry of Transport, Communications and Information Technology), through the Road Numbering and Classification Guide. The guide outlined two hundred and twenty-three distributor roads detailing their official classification, names, start and end point and distances.

== Definition ==
According to the 2017 Road Design Guide, distributor roads are required to meet the following standards:

- Accommodate low-speed travel.
- Links areas that generate high traffic volumes such as urban areas and major villages.
- Service roads connected to higher-rated roads.

== List of distributor roads ==
North al Batinah Governorate
Road number	Official road name	Start Point	End Point	Province	km	mi
D100	Shinas-al Rala Road	Shinas N5	al Rala	Shinas	15	9.3
D101	Rissat al Milih Road	al Farfara N5	Rissat al Milih	Shinas	7	4.3
D102	Wadi Rajma Road	al Makhamira N5	al Masdar	Shinas	13	8.1
D103	Sur Bani Hammad Road	Shinas R/A N5	Sur Bani Hammad (A1)	Shinas	11	6.8
D104	Sultan Qaboos Road	Sallan R/A	al Nuzha Street	Liwa	2	1.2
D105	Nabar Road	Liwa N5	Asrar Bani Sad A1 (Shinas)	Liwa	8	5
D106	Liwa-al Rissa Road	Liwa R/A N5	al Rissa	Liwa	21	13
D107	Sohar Port Road	Sohar Port R/A	al Batinah Expressway N1 (Exit 264)	Liwa	9	5.6
D108	Harat al Shaikh Road	Liwa R/A N5	Harat al Shaikh (A1)	Liwa	6	3.7
D109	Harmul Road	Liwa R/A N5	Harmul	Liwa	4	2.5
D110	Majan Industrial Road	A1 - R/A 244	Majan Industrial Area	Liwa	7	4.3
D111	al Ghudhaifa - Diqal Road	al Ghudhaifa (A5)	Diqal (S17)	Sohar	80	49.7
D112	al Tadhamon Street	Falaj al Qabayil N5	Majis	Sohar	5	3.1
D113	Muwailih Street	al Tarif N5	Yanbu	Sohar	14	8.7
D114	al Nuzha Street	Sohar City	Majis	Sohar	15	9.3
D115	Sohar Street	Sohar Interchange N5	Sohar City	Sohar	3	1.9
D116	al Mahmoudi Street	al Tarif N5	Karwan (D128)	Sohar	3	1.9
D117	al Bahjah Street	Bahjah N5	Hillat al Shaikh (D138)	Sohar	2	1.2
D118	al Tarif Street	al Tarif (D129)	al Hambar	Sohar	9	5.6
D119	Wadi al Hilti Road	Jarura (A5)	Halahil	Sohar	28	17.4
D120	al Shatti Road	al Suwaihira R/A N5	Sohar City	Sohar	8	5
D121	al Safi Street	Khaur al Siyabi N5	Khaur al Siyabi (A1)	Sohar	2	1.2
D122	al Jaiz al Sultani	al Shatti Road (D138)	Hillat al Subara	Sohar	5	3.1
D123	al Uwainat Street	al Uwainat N5	Khaur al Siyabi N5	Sohar	4	2.5
D124	Saih al Tayyibat	Murtafat Saham	al Hijari	Saham	18	11.2
D125	al Fulaij-Wadi Hibi Road	al Fulaij	Suwaidi (A5)	Saham	29	18
D126	Abu al Durus-Hillat Al Burj Road	Abu al Durus N5	al Khaburahh	Saham	40	24.9
D127	Saham Road	Saham R/A N5	Saham City	Saham	5	3.1
D128	Um al Jayarif Road	al Radda N5	Um al Jayarif	Saham	3	1.9
D129	al Baridi Road / Hajr al Sunainat	al Buraik N5	Hajr al Sunainat	al Khaburah	19	11.8
D130	Falaj Bani Rabiya Road	al Bidya N5	Falaj Bani Rabiya	al Khaburah	14	8.7
D131	Qasbiyaat Road	al Qasbiyaat N5	al Qasbiyaat	al Khaburah	1	0.6
D132	al Zaab Road	Qasbiyyat al Zaab N5	Batinah Costal Road (A1)	al Khaburah	2	1.2
D133	al Khaburah Road	al Khaburah R/A N5	al Khaburah City	al Khaburah	2	1.2
D134	Mashayiq Road	al Mashayiq N5	al Maiha	al Suwaiq	30	18.6
D135	al Hailain Road	Saih al Rahmat N5	al Hailain Village	al Suwaiq	40	24.9
D136	Hail al Ghafa Road	al Shatir N5	Wadi al Haimali	al Suwaiq	42	26.1
D137	al Bidaya Road	al Bidaya N5	al Batinah Costal Road (A1)	al Suwaiq	3	1.9
D138	Um Saih Road	Khabbat al Nawafil N5	al Uwaid-Widam al Sahil Road (D250)	al Suwaiq	3	1.9
D139	Khadra al Sad Road	Badi al Qash N5	Badi al Qash (D250)	al Suwaiq	3	1.9
D140	al Suwaiq Road	al Suwaiq R/A N5	al Suwaiq Port	al Suwaiq	4	2.5
South al Batinah Governorate
Road number	Official road name	Start Point	End Point	Province	km	mi
D200	al Uwaid Road	Mulada R/A N5	al Uwaid (A1)	Al Musannah	5	3.1
D201	Mahhara Road	Mahhara N5	Abu Abali (A1)	Al Musannah	5	3.1
D202	Abu Abali al Sahil Road	al Maghsar N5	Abu Abali (A1)	Al Musannah	5	3.1
D203	al Sahil-al Suwaiq Road	al Sahil	al Suwaiq	Al Musannah	24	14.9
D204	Widam Al Ghaf Road	al Ghail N5	Widam al Sahil	Al Musannah	4	2.5
D205	al Uwaid-Widam al Sahil Road	al Suwaiq	al Musana	Al Musannah	24	14.9
D206	al Tarif-al Musana Road	al Tarif	al Musana	Al Musannah	5	3.1
D207	Widam al Sahil Road	Tharmad R/A N5	Tharmad City (A1)	Al Musannah	5	3.1
D208	al Musana Road	al Musana R/A N5	al Musana City	Al Musannah	5	3.1
D209	al Faghira	al Faghira	Halban	Barka	28	17.4
D210	Barka Road	Barka Interchange N5	Barka City	Barka	5	3.1
D211	al Muraisi Road	Bait al Barka	al Naman	Barka	4	2.5
D212	al Muraighat Road	al Muraighat N5	al Muraighat (A1)	Barka	3	1.9
D213	al Sallaha-Barka Road	Hay asim	al Muraisi	Barka	15	9.3
D214	al Sawadi al Sahil Road	al Billa N5	al Sawadi al Sahil	Barka	12	7.5
D215	al Abyad Road	al Muraighat N5	al Khatam/ al Abyad	Barka	26	16.2
D216	al Farraya Road	al Saumahan N5	N1 (Exit 66)	Barka	5	3.1
D217	al Sallaha-Barka Road	Sallahah N5	Hay asim	Barka	3	1.9
D218	al Fulaij Road	al Rumais N5	al Fulaij	Barka	10	6.2
D219	Halban-al Wasit	Halban N1	al Wasit (A7)	Barka	34	21.1
D220	Wadi al Shibak Road	Habra	al Khatam	Nakhal	15	9.3
D221	Buwa Road	Saih Salima	Fanja	Nakhal	21	13
D222	Nakhal-Wadi Al Hadak Road	Nakhal (A7)	Nakhal (A7)	Nakhal	6	3.7
D223	Habra Road	Habra	Afi	Wadi al Mawil	6	3.7
D224	Afi Road	Afi	Musilmat	Wadi al Mawil	7	4.3
D225	Wadi Mistal Road	al Shubaika (A7)	Wikan	Wadi al Mawil	29	18
D226	al Alya Road	al Awabi (A7)	al Alya	al Awabi	27	16.8
D227	al Hauqain - al Hazm Road	al Hazm (A7)	al Gharwa	Rustaq	31	19.3
D228	al Barida Road	al Awabi (A7)	Bahla	Rustaq	69	42.9
D229	Wibil Road	al Rustaq (A7)	al Rustaq (A7)	Rustaq	4	2.5
D230	al Rustaq Road	al Rustaq (A7)	al Rustaq City	Rustaq	4	2.5
D231	al Rustaq-Falaj al Hadith Road	al Rustaq	A6 (Km 43)	Rustaq	8	5
D232	al Dahas-al Tabaqa Road	Khafdi (A6)	Amq	Rustaq	25	15.5
Muscat Governorate
Road number	Official road name	Start Point	End Point	Province	km	mi
D300	al Seeb - Halban Road	Bait al Barka N5	N1 (Exit 53)	Seeb	8	5
D301	al Imar Street	al Mubaila al Janubiyya	N1 (Exit 45)	Seeb	6	3.7
D302	al Nur Street	al Khair R/A	al Mubaila al Janubiyya	Seeb	8	5
D303	al Imar - al Nuzha	al Imar Street	al Nuzha Street	Seeb	4	2.5
D304	al Khair Street	al Mubaila N5	al Mubaila al Janubiyya	Seeb	8	5
D305	Dama Street	al Mubaila N5	al Seeb	Seeb	17	10.6
D306	al Nuzha Street	al Mubaila (S21)	N1 (Exit 42)	Seeb	9	5.6
D307	al Seeb - al Nur	al Seeb - Halban Road	al Nur Street	Seeb	5	3.1
D308	al Ubab Street	al Adiyat Street	Dama Street	Seeb	1	0.6
D309	al Sharadi Street	al Mubaila N1	al Seeb	Seeb	4	2.5
D310	Hayy al Arafat	N1 (Exit-22)	Old Airport N5	Seeb	5	3.1
D311	Wadi al Bahayis Street	al Khaud Junction N5	al Seeb N5	Seeb	8	5
D312	al Furusiyya Street	al Seeb	al Seeb (S21)	Seeb	2	1.2
D313	al Rauda Street	al Mauj R/A	al Seeb (S21)	Seeb	9	5.6
D314	al Tamir Street	al Mawalih al Janubiyya	al Rusail Park	Seeb	3	1.9
D315	Mazun Street	al Mauj R/A	al Khaud (S22)	Seeb	9	5.6
D316	al Marid Street	Old Muscat Airport	Ghala	Bawshar	10	6.2
D317	Jisir al Wizarat Street	al Khuwair North	al Khuwair al Janubiyya	Bawshar	1	0.6
D318	al Kharijiyya Street	al Gubra N5	Madinat al ilam	Bawshar	8	5
D319	Madinat al Sultan Qaboos Street	al Khuwair Junction	Madinat al Sultan Qaboos N1	Bawshar	3	1.9
D320	Dauhat al Adab Street	al Khuwair (S28)	Madinat al Sultan Qaboos N1	Bawshar	9	5.6
D321	Darsait - al Bustan	Darsait Junction	al Bustan R/A	Matrah	18	11.2
D322	Qantab-al Jissa Road	al Bustan	al Jissa	Matrah	8	5
D323	al Shati Street	al Qurum Junction	Shati al Qurum	Matrah	8	5
D324	al Fursan Street	Ruwi CBD area	al Wadi al Kabir	Matrah	7	4.3
D325	al Jami Street	Ruwi R/A	Sheraton Hotel	Matrah	1	0.6
D326	al Burj Street	Ruwi Church Signal	Ruwi Cinema	Matrah	1	0.6
D327	Maidan al Fatah Street	al Wutayya Intersection	Mina al Fahal	Matrah	2	1.2
D328	al Ehsan Street	al Amirat (S26)	al Amirat	al Amirat	6	3.7
D329	al Jud Street	al Amirat Interchange	al Amirat	al Amirat	5	3.1
D330	Madinat al Nahda Street	al Amirat Police station	al Amirat	al Amirat	16	9.9
D331	al Hajir Street	al Wasit	al Mahyul (A2)	al Amirat	14	8.7
D332	Qurayyat	Qurayyat Interchange (A2)	Ramlah (A2)	Qurayyat	12	7.5
North al Sharqiyah Governorate
Road number	Official road name	Start Point	End Point	Province	km	mi
D400	al Rahba Road	al Jarda	al Rahba	al Mudhaibi	22	13.7
D401	Wadi Indam	al Jarda	al Kharma (A9)	al Mudhaibi	38	23.6
D402	Sinau-Barzman Road	Sinau	Barzman (A9)	al Mudhaibi	32	19.9
D403	al Alya -Khadra Bani Dafa Road	al khadra (A8)	al Alya	al Mudhaibi	20	12.4
D404	Lizq - al Shuwaiyi Road	Lizq	al Shuwaiyi	al Mudhaibi	14	8.7
D405	al Aflaj Road	al Shariq	al Zahira	al Mudhaibi	51	31.7
D406	Um Qarn - al Ghulaji Road	al Mudairib	Um Qarn	al Qabil	15	9.3
D407	Abu Dhalma-al Qabil Road	al Qabil (N4)	Qabil al Busaid	al Qabil	38	23.6
D408	al Dhahir Road	al Wasil(N4)	al Dhahir	Bidiya	36	22.4
D409	Bidiyya Road	al Wasil (N4)	Bidiyya (N4)	Bidiya	22	13.7
D410	Masrun Road	Masrun (N4)	Lizq	Ibra	53	32.9
D411	Ibra Road	Ibra College (N4)	Sufala (N4)	Ibra	20	12.4
D412	Wadi Bani Khalid Road	N4 (Exit 157)	Wadi Bani Khalid	Wadi Bani Khalid	24	14.9
South al Sharqiyah Governorate
Road number	Official road name	Start Point	End Point	Province	km	mi
D413	al Kamil Wa al Wafi Road	al Sharqiyah Expressway (N4 Exit 191)	al Sharqiyah Expressway (N4 Exit 202)	Al Kamil Wa al Wafi	22	13.7
D414	Ras al Had - Wadi Sal - al Jawabi Road	Ras al Had	al Jawabi	Jalan Bani Bu Ali	70	43.5
D415	Jalan Bani Bu Hasan-Jalan Bani Bu ali Road	Jalan Bani Bu Hasan	Jalan Bani Bu Ali	Jalan Bani Bu Hassan	11	6.8
D416	Ghuwaila Road	Jalan Bani Bu Ali	Bu Madara (D431)	Jalan Bani Bu Hassan	52	32.3
D417	Amq- Haql Road	Mursais	Amq	Masirah	6	3.7
D418	Bar Buwaira Road	al Shubaika	al Husaniyya	Sur	8	5
D419	al Fulaij - al Shubaika - Wadi Bani Jaber Road	al Fulaij	al Shubaika	Sur	26	16.2
D420	Sur Meandering Road	Bilad Sur R/A	al Aija Beach	Sur	20	12.4
D421	Barr Buwayrah-Ash Sharkhah Road	A2 (RA-174)	A2	Sur	11	6.8
ad Dakhiliyah ‍Governorate
Road number	Official road name	Start Point	End Point	Province	km	mi
D500	al Zahiya Road	N3 (Exit-98)	A9 (Km 151)	Adam	41	25.5
D501	Saih al Raul Road	Qarn al Alam N3	Saih al Raul	Adam	60	37.3
D502	al Nuhaida-Ras al Jabal Road	Adam N3	A9 (Km 122)	Adam	65	40.4
D503	al Bashair Road	Izz	Adam Sinau Road	Adam	40	24.9
D504	al Hamra Road	al Hamra R/A	al Hamra	al Hamra	11	6.8
D505	al Hamra - Wadi Hat Road	al Hamra	al Khutaim	al Hamra	42	26.1
D506	Musaidira-al Arf Road	Mitan N3	al Araf (A9)	Bahla	82	51
D507	al Mamur - Hamra al Drooa Road	al Mamur	Hamra al Drooa (A9)	Bahla	85	52.8
D508	Wadi Qurayyat Road	al GhafatN3	Wadi Qurayyat (S32)	Bahla	21	13
D509	al Rawda - al Hamra Road	al Qa (29)	al Hamra	Bahla	19	11.8
D510	Bahla-Bilad Sait Road	al Mamur R/A	Bilad Sait	Bahla	15	9.3
D511	Bahla-al Fatah Road	N2 (Km 157)	al Fath R/A	Bahla	10	6.2
D512	Fanja Street	Fanja (N2)	al Waghla	Bidbid	7	4.3
D513	Bidbid Road	Bidbid (N2)	Saih al Muwaidin (N4)	Bidbid	5	3.1
D514	Izki-al Rusais Road	Izki	al Rusais	Izki	11	6.8
D515	al Qaryatayn Road	Izki	Wadi Indam Road	Izki	27	16.8
D516	al Aqil-al Mukhtari	al Aqil	al Mukhtari	Izki	22	13.7
D517	Karsha-Manah Road	Karsha N3	Manah	Manah	10	6.2
D518	Birkat al Mouz - al Jabal al Akhdar Road	Birkat al Mauz	Wadi Bani Habib	Manah	46	28.6
D519	Birkat al Mauz Road	N2 (Exit-118)	Birkat al Mauz	Nizwa	3	1.9
D520	Faraq Road	Nizwa (N2 - Exit 134)	Faraq (S31 - Junction 31)	Nizwa	2	1.2
D521	Falaj Daris - Wadi Sumait Road	Falaj Daris Junction	Wadi Sumait(R/A 18)	Nizwa	7	4.3
D522	al Ain Road	Hay al Ain Junction	Burj al Qarn Junction	Nizwa	5	3.1
D523	Karsha-Taimsa Road	Karsha N3	N2 (Km 150)	Nizwa	28	17.4
D524	al Madara Road	al Haub Junction (N2)	al Suwairij(N2)	Samail	6	3.7
D525	Jurdmana Road	Luzug (N4)	Jurdumana	Samail	26	16.2
D526	Samail Industrial Area Road	Samail Interchange (N4 Exit-18)	Jurdmana Road	Samail	10	6.2
D527	al Uyaiyna -Falaj al Maragha Road	Saih al Dhahir (N2)	Mahram	Samail	22	13.7
D528	Saih al Dhahir-Wisad Road	Saih al Dhahir (N2 Exit-72)	Wisad (N2)	Samail	5	3.1
D529	al Madara - Luzugh Road	al Madara	Luzugh	Samail	20	12.4
D530	al Jarda-Saumara Road	al Dahya (N4)	Wadi Indam Road	Samail	19	11.8
D531	al Ain - al Afiya Road	al Ain	al Afiya	Samail	7	4.3
D532	Wadi Mahram Road	al Afiya (N2)	Wadi Indam Road	Samail	42	26.1
al Buraimi Governorate
Road number	Official road name	Start Point	End Point	Province	km	mi
D600	Mahda-Kahil Road	A3 (Exit 126)	Mahda (S12)	Mahdah	3	1.9
D601	Abu Badi-Mahda Road	Mahda (S12)	al Sumaini (A3)	Mahdah	40	24.9
D602	al Saf-al Shuwaiha Road	al Urhumiyya	al Fai	Mahdah	27	16.8
D603	al Uqaida-al Musaidira Road	al Uqaida (N6)	al Musaidira (S12)	Mahdah	16	9.9
D604	Katna-al Daqiq-al Taliyi Road	Border Check Post (N6)	Wadi Sa (A4)	al Buraimi	57	35.4
D605	al Jmea Road	al Buraimi (D631)	al Buraimi Park (A3)	al Buraimi	5	3.1
D606	Hillat al Sur Road	al Salam Hotel (S14)	( Oman-U.A.E Check Point )	al Buraimi	4	2.5
D607	Wusat al Maina Road	Near Hospital R/A	Muscat Resutrant (S14)	al Buraimi	5	3.1
D608	al Qala Road	Fort R/A	D633	al Buraimi	6	3.7
D609	Ard al Gaw Road	City Cinema Buraimi	D627	al Buraimi	4	2.5
al Dhahirah Governorate
Road number	Official road name	Start Point	End Point	Province	km	mi
D610	Hail al Khanabshah Road	al Hashima	al Ain	Dhank	37	23
D611	al Khubaib-al Ghuwaifat-Dank Road	Dank	al Nayama	Dhank	19	11.8
D612	Yanqul - Wadi Sa Road	Yanqul	Wadi Sa	Yanqul	82	51
D613	Dank-Yanqul Road	A5 (RA 115)	al Dhuwaihiriyya	Yanqul	15	9.3
D614	Hujairimat-al Arid Road	Khadl A5	Hujairimat	Ibri	9	5.6
D615	Kahanat-Ghuwailimiyya Road	Kahanat (S17)	Muskin (S18)	Ibri	10	6.2
D616	Dhahir al Fawaris Road	Yanqul	Dhahir al Fawaris	Ibri	11	6.8
D617	Maqniyat Road	Hujairimat (A6)	al Dariz (A6)	Ibri	92	57.2
D618	(al Dariz - Ibri Road)-(Ibri - Nizwa Road)	N2 (KM 248)	al Araqi (A6)	Ibri	10	6.2
D619	Ibri-Saih al Masarrat Road	N2 (RA 266)	al Rayibah (A6)	Ibri	14	8.7
D620	Ibri Road	Ibri N2 (RA 260)	Ibri city	Ibri	3	1.9
D621	al Mahyul Road	A5 (RA 119)	Dahir al Fwaris	Ibri	16	9.9
D622	al Shariah Road	Ibri city	Ibri airport	Ibri	10	6.2
D623	al Ghafat Road	al Ghafat N2 (Exit 175)	al Khaburah (KM 219)	Ibri	77	47.8
D624	Fuhud-Jibal Road	Fuhud Airport	Jibal	Ibri	46	28.6
D625	Natih-Fuhud Road	A9 (KM 90)	al khuwair	Ibri	164	101.9
al Wusta Governorate
Road number	Official road name	Start Point	End Point	Province	km	mi
D700	al Duqm Road	al Duqm City (A8)	ROP station (D721)	Duqm	20	12.4
D701	al Duqm Port Road	A8 End Point	Duqm Port	Duqm	18	11.2
D702	Raima-Habhib Road	Raima A12 (RA 121)	A11 (RA 161)	al Jazir	55	34.2
D703	Haima-al Sahama Road	Haima N3	Kibrit	Haima	77	47.8
Dhofar Governorate
Road number	Official road name	Start Point	End Point	Province	km	mi
D800	Marmul-Shalim-Sauqara- Madraka Road	Amal (KM 226)	Shalim	Shalim and Juzur Hallaniyat	24	14.9
D801	Thumrait Street	Thumrait N3 (KM 787)	Thumrait N3 (RA 790)	Thumrait	5	3.1
D802	Jabel Samhan Road	Tawi Atair	Jabal Samhan	Mirbat	33	20.5
D803	Salalah - Mirbat Road	Mirbat A11 (RA 577)	Mirbat A11 (KM 575)	Mirbat	6	3.7
D804	Tawi Atair	Tawi Atair A11 (Exit 587)	Wadi Darbat A11 (Exit 607)	Mirbat	34	21.1
D805	Madinat al Haq - Kidad Road	Tawi Atair	Adakham (S43)	Taqah	25	15.5
D806	Madinat al Haq-Antaghaq-Akrut Road	A11 (RA 620)	Adakham (S43)	Taqah	26	16.2
D807	Taqah Street	Taqah A11 (RA 611)	Taqah A11 (RA 614)	Taqah	5	3.1
D808	Salalah-Hasik Road	A11 (RA 620)	A11 (RA 652)	Taqah	8	5
D809	Sahnawt Road	Dhofar University R/A	Sahnawt al Janubiyya	Salalah	8	5
D810	Razat-Ashanhaib	al Mamoora R/A (A11)	Ashanhaib (S43)	Salalah	30	18.6
D811	al Farook Road	Sadah (S45)	Sahnawt al Janubiyya	Salalah	8	5
D812	al Salam Road	al Hasila	al Matiz	Salalah	9	5.6
D813	al Mansoorah Street	al Dahriz	Sadah (S45)	Salalah	4	2.5
D814	al Muntazah Road	ar Rubat	al Matiz	Salalah	9	5.6
D815	Sultan Qaboos Street	al Dahriz	Industrial Area N8 (RA 14)	Salalah	19	11.8
D816	al Matar Street	Burj al Nahda R/A	al Haffa	Salalah	3	1.9
D817	Usman Bin Affan Road	N8 (RA 18)	S45 (RA 22)	Salalah	4	2.5
D818	23 July Street	al Hasila (S45)	Hospital R/A	Salalah	7	4.3
D819	al Sultan Taymoor Street	al Dahriz	Sadah (S45)	Salalah	9	5.6
D820	al Robat Road	Sadah (S45)	Millenium resort	Salalah	3	1.9
D821	al Nahdah Street	Ploice Station (S45)	al Hisn	Salalah	3	1.9
D822	Shir-Zaik Road	N3 (KM 852)	Zaik	Salalah	22	13.7
D823	Arjahatan-Salalah Road	Dhofar University N8 (RA 2)	Qairun Hairiti (S44)	Salalah	27	16.8
D824	al Nama Street	Wadi Salut (S45)	Hospital R/A	Salalah	1	0.6
D825	Salalah-Aal al Ali Road	Arift N8 (RA 22)	Titam (S44)	Salalah	26	16.2
D826	Salalah - Dalkhut Road	Dalkhut N8 (KM 148)	Dalkhut N8 (KM 161)	Dhalkut	23	14.3
Musandam Governorate
Road number	Official road name	Start Point	End Point	Province	km	mi
D900	Sal ala Road	Khasab A13	Sal Ala	Khasab	24	14.9
D901	Industrial Road	Khasab A13	Khasab Industrial area	Khasab	3	1.9
D902	Dibba Road	Dibba (Oman-UAE Check Point)	Dibba (Oman-UAE Check Point)	Dibba	10	6.2
D903	Madha Road	Madha	Hajar Bani Hamid	Madha	15	9.3

== See also ==
- Transport in Oman
- National roads in Oman
- Arterial roads in Oman
- Secondary roads in Oman
