= List of cities in Oman =

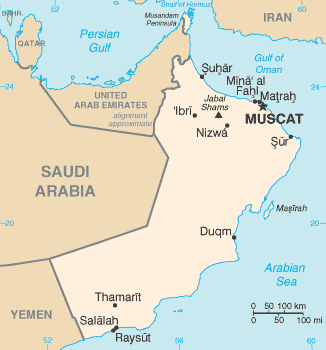
Map of Oman

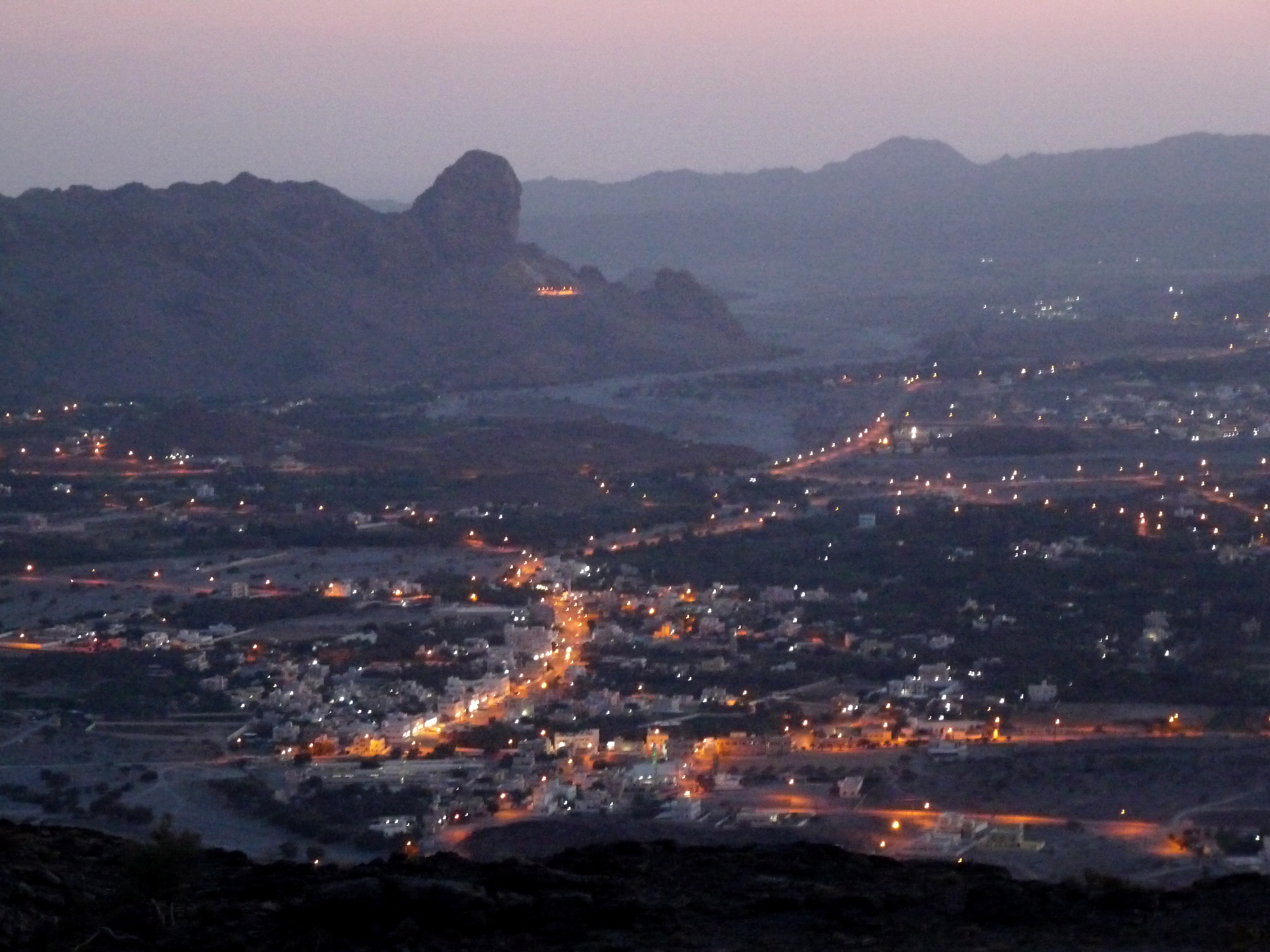
Al Hamra

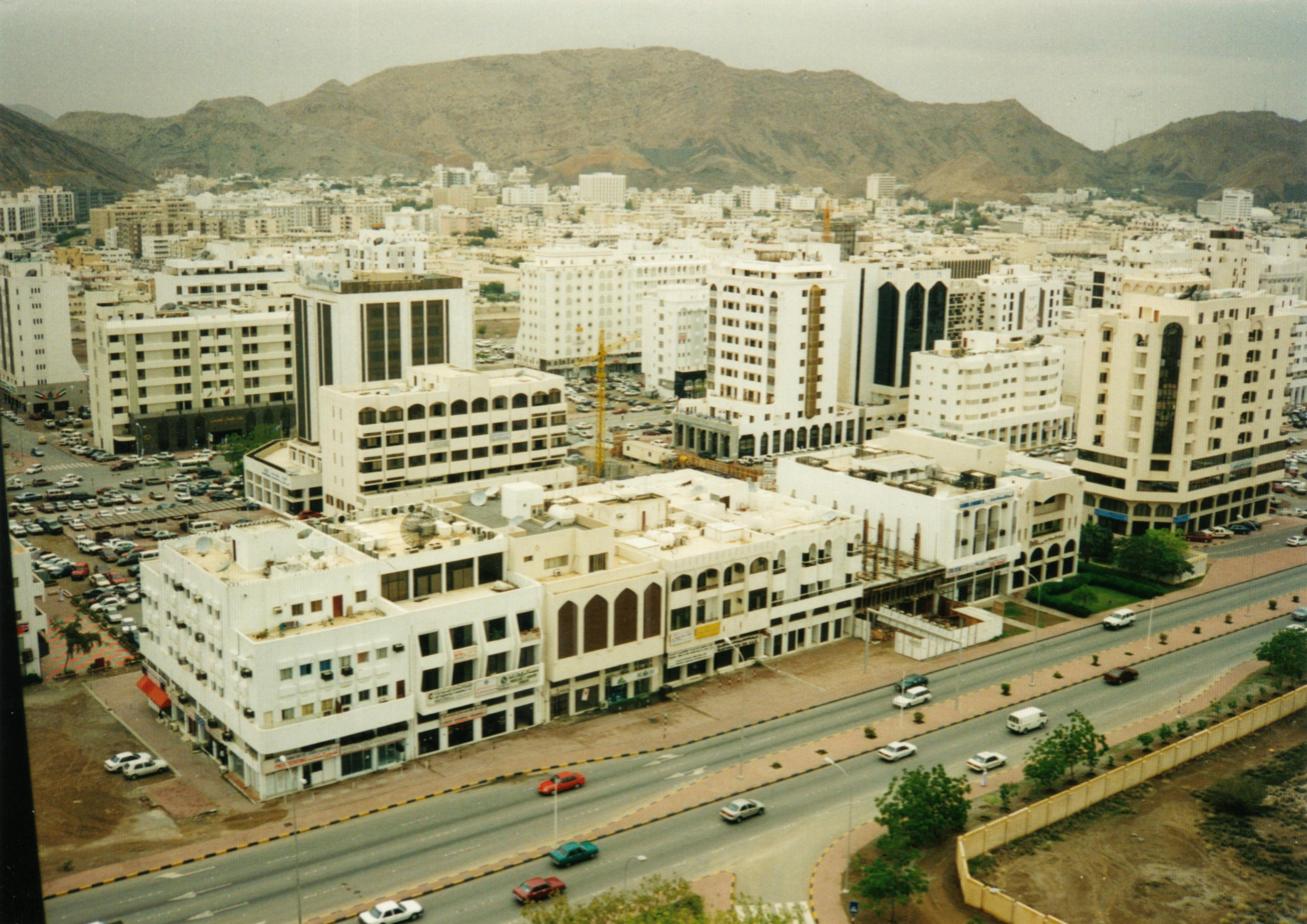
Muscat, capital of Oman in 1997

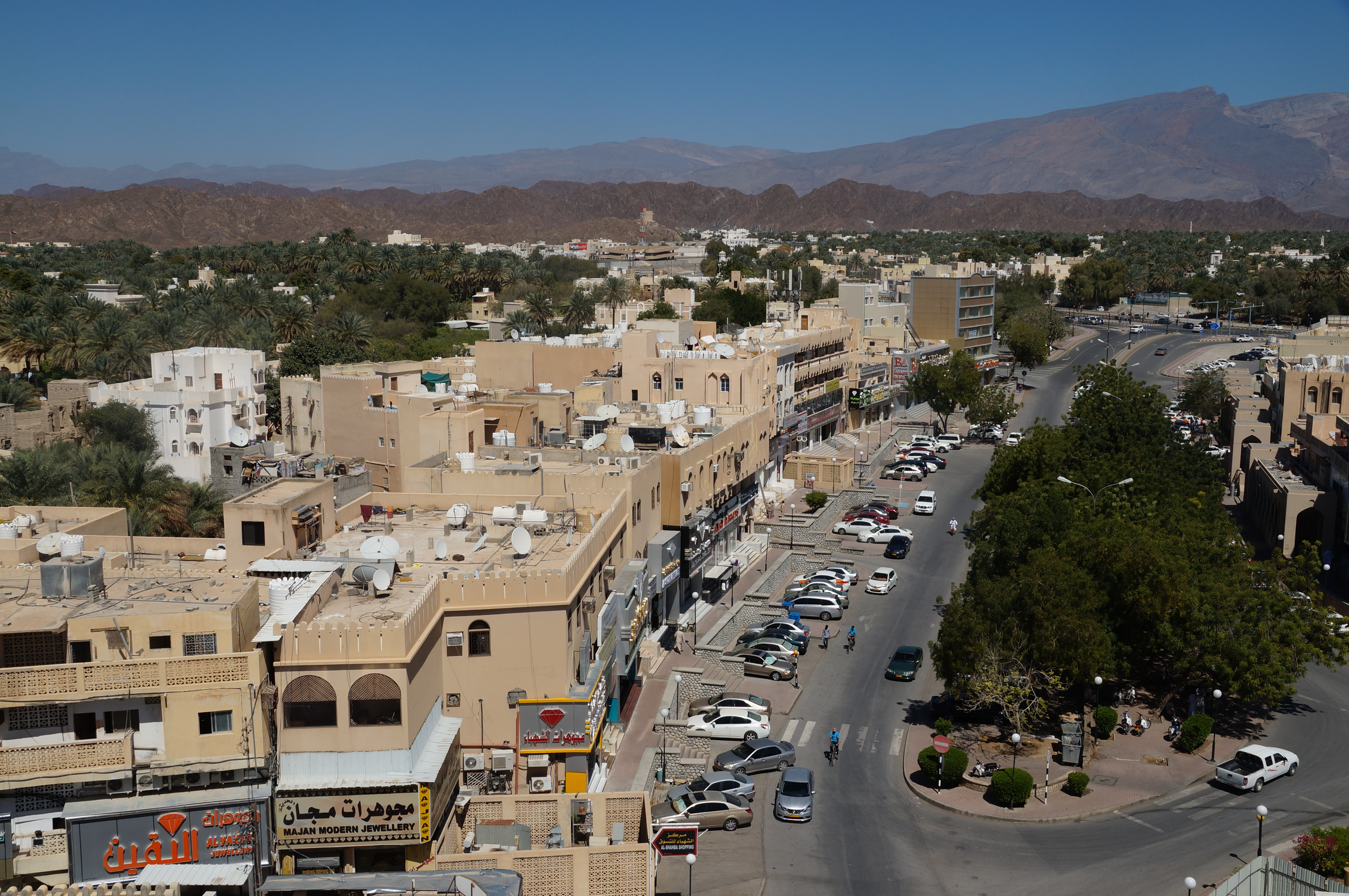
Downtown Nizwa

This is a list of cities and towns in Oman. The Sultanate of Oman is administratively divided into eleven governorates (muhafazah), which are further subdivided into 63 provinces (wilayat). The capital and largest city is Muscat, which is located in the Muscat Governorate on the Gulf of Oman. Other major cities include Seeb, Salalah, and Sohar.

== List of cities by governorate ==
=== Muscat Governorate ===
The Muscat Governorate comprises six wilayats and is the most populous governorate in Oman. Its capital is Muscat.

- Muscat
- Muttrah
- As Sib
- Bawshar
- Al Amarat
- Quriyat

=== Dhofar Governorate ===
The Dhofar Governorate comprises ten wilayats and its capital is Salalah.

- Salalah
- Thumrait
- Taqah
- Mirbat
- Sadah
- Rakhyut
- Dhalkut
- Muqshin
- Shalim and the Hallaniyat Islands
- Al Mazyunah

=== Musandam Governorate ===
The Musandam Governorate comprises four wilayats and its capital is Khasab.

- Khasab
- Bukha
- Daba
- Madha

=== Al Buraimi Governorate ===
The Al Buraimi Governorate comprises three wilayats and its capital is Al Buraimi.

- Al Buraimi
- Mahdah
- Al Sunaynah

=== Ad Dakhiliyah Governorate ===
The Ad Dakhiliyah Governorate comprises nine wilayats and its capital is Nizwa.

- Nizwa
- Bahla
- Manah
- Al Hamra
- Adam
- Izki
- Samail
- Bidbid
- Al Jabal Al Akhdar

=== Al Batinah North Governorate ===
The Al Batinah North Governorate comprises six wilayats and its capital is Sohar.

- Sohar
- Shinas
- Liwa
- Saham
- Al Khaburah
- Al Suwaiq

=== Al Batinah South Governorate ===
The Al Batinah South Governorate comprises six wilayats and its capital is Rustaq.

- Rustaq
- Al Awabi
- Nakhal
- Wadi Al Maawil
- Barka
- Al Musanaah

=== Ash Sharqiyah North Governorate ===
The Ash Sharqiyah North Governorate comprises seven wilayats and its capital is Ibra.

- Ibra
- Al Mudhaibi
- Bidiyah
- Al Qabil
- Wadi Bani Khalid
- Dama Wa Al Taiyin
- Sinaw

=== Ash Sharqiyah South Governorate ===
The Ash Sharqiyah South Governorate comprises five wilayats and its capital is Sur.

- Sur
- Al Kamil Wa Al Wafi
- Jalan Bani Bu Hassan
- Jalan Bani Bu Ali
- Masirah

=== Ad Dhahirah Governorate ===
The Ad Dhahirah Governorate comprises three wilayats and its capital is Ibri.

- Ibri
- Yanqul
- Dhank

=== Al Wusta Governorate ===
The Al Wusta Governorate comprises four wilayats and its capital is Haima.

- Haima
- Mahout
- Duqm
- Al Jazer

== See also ==
- Governorates of Oman
- Provinces of Oman
- Media related to Cities in Oman at Wikimedia Commons
