= Al Batinah Region =

Former Governorate of Oman

Al Batinah
- Governorate
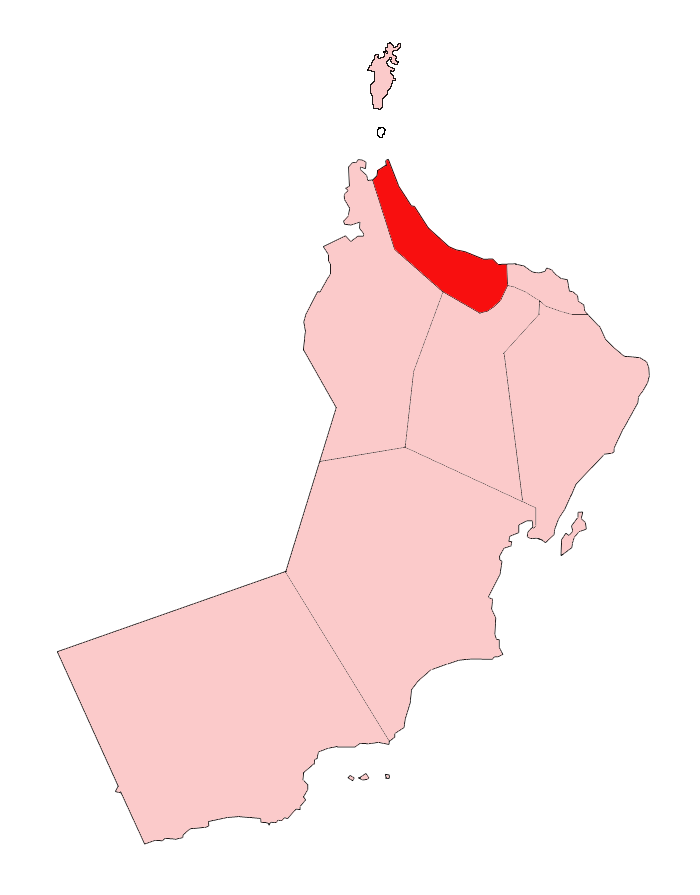
- Country: Oman
- Capital: Sohar

Area
  - Total: 12,500 km^{2} (4,800 sq mi)

Population (2010 census)
  - Total: 772,590
  - Density: 61.8/km^{2} (160/sq mi)

Al-Bāţinah (Arabic: ٱلْبَاطِنَة) was one of the regions (Mintaqat) of Oman. On 28 October 2011, Al-Batinah Region was bifurcated into Al Batinah North Governorate and Al Batinah South Governorate.

The region occupied an important location on the coast of Gulf of Oman. It laid between Khatmat Malahah in the north and Ras al-Hamra in the south, and confined between Al-Hajar Mountains in the west and the Gulf of Oman in the east.

== Provinces ==
Al Batinah Region contained the largest number of provinces (wilayat), numbering twelve 12:

- Sohar
- Ar Rustaq
- Shinas,
- Liwa
- Saham
- Al-Khaburah
- Suwayq
- Nakhal
- Wadi Al Maawil
- Al Awabi
- Al-Musannah
- Barka

Suwayq was considered as the biggest wilayah in the Batinah region. Sohar was the regional capital.

== Historic maps of Oman showing Batinah ==
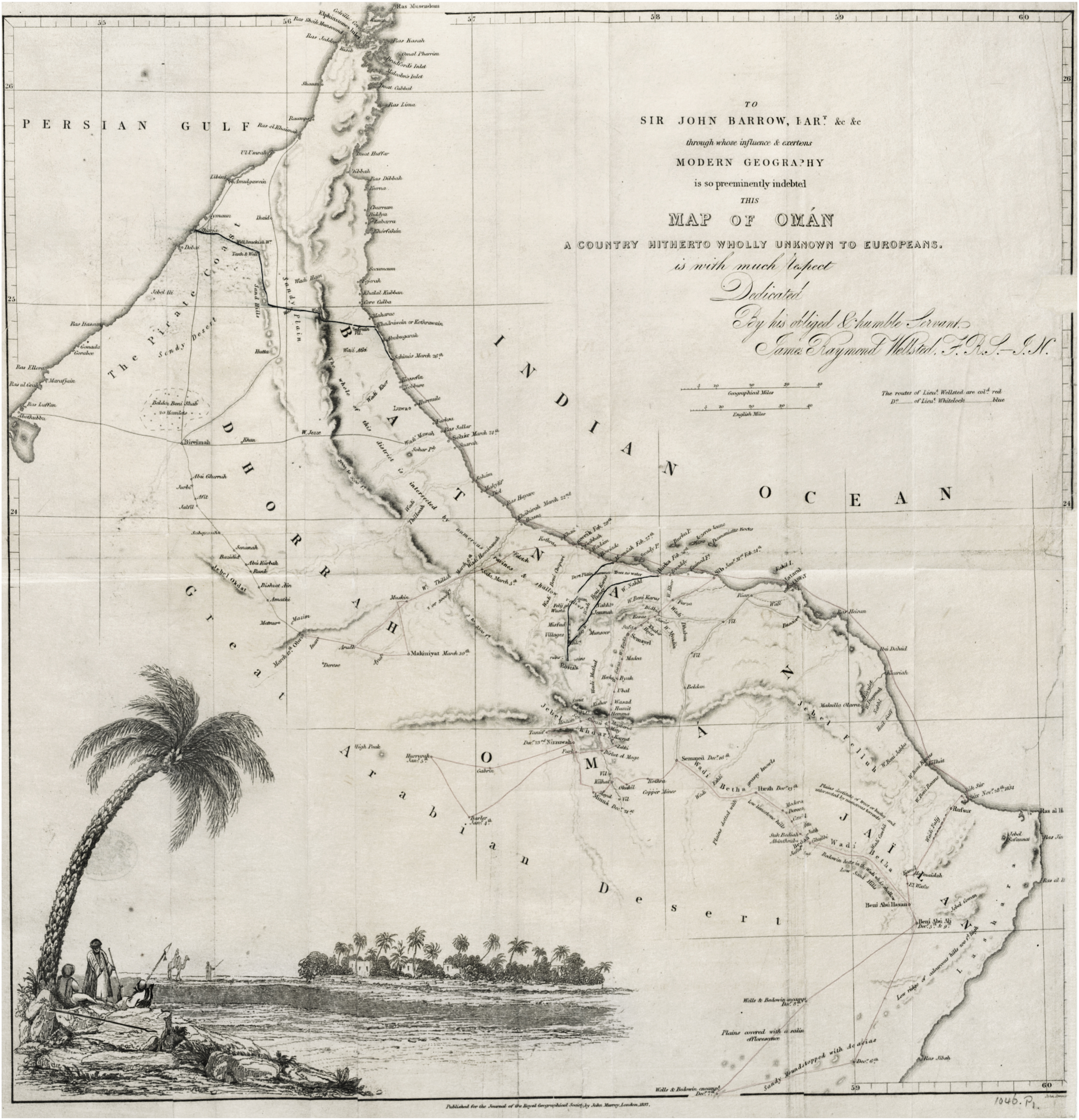
1838: BATINA

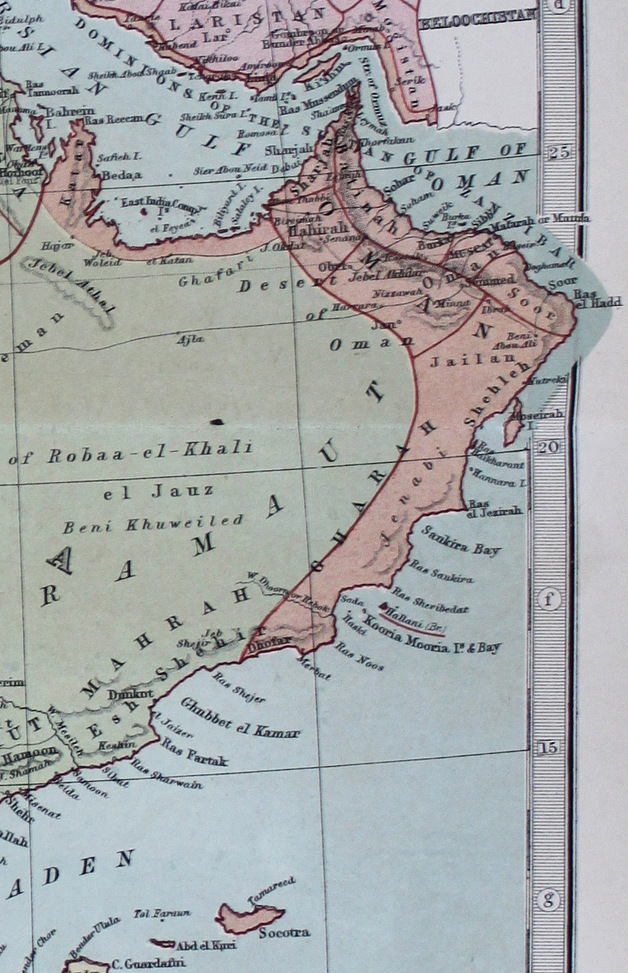
1873

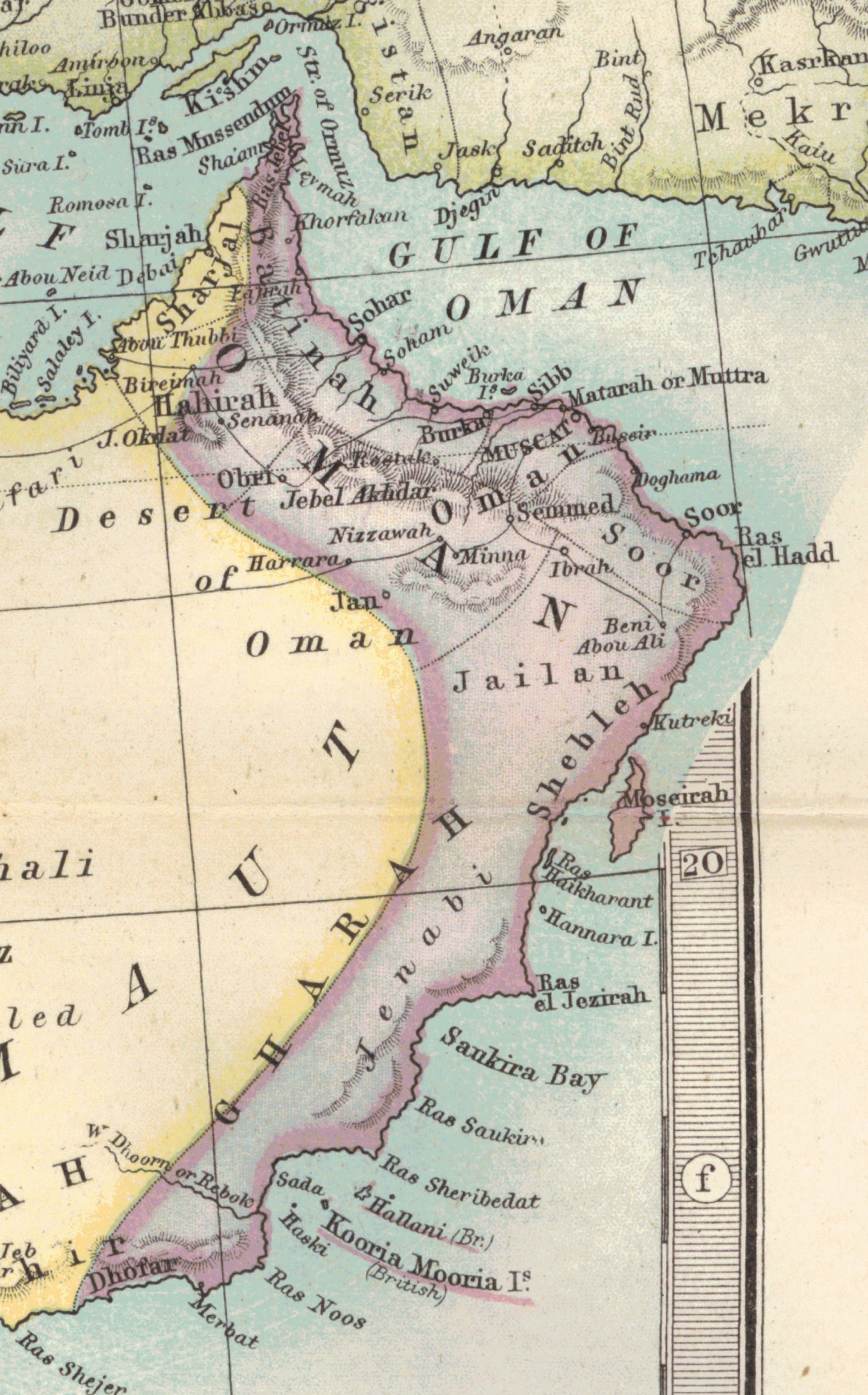
1879

== See also ==
- Oman proper
- Tawam (region)
