= Arterial roads in Oman =

Arterial Roads in Oman
- Marker for the A13

System information
- Length: 2,883 km (1,791 mi)
- Formed: December 18, 2019; 6 years ago

Highway names
- Arterial Roads: Axx

System links
- Transport in Oman

Arterial roads in Oman are important roads which connect cities and national roads together. They form the second highest category in the Omani route numbering system and are designated with route numbers beginning with "A", from A1 to A13

The arterial road system was established on December 18, 2019, by the Ministry of Transport (now the Ministry of Transport, Communications and Information Technology), through the Road Numbering and Classification Guide. The guide outlined thirteen arterial roads detailing their official classification, names, start and end point and distances.

== Definition ==
According to the 2017 Road Design Guide, arterial roads are required to meet the following standards:

- Serve medium-distance travel
- Connect major areas together
- Link major areas to national roads.
- Connect national roads together.
- Form a self-contained interconnected network between arterial roads and national roads
- Provides access to rural areas.

== List of arterial roads ==
Road number	Official road name	Start point	End point	Governorates	km	mi
A1	Sultan Taymur Bin Faysal Road	Halban ( N1 - Exit 53)	Khatmat Milaha ( N5 - Exit 308)	Muscat, Al Batinah South, Al Batinah North	246	152.9
A2	Muscat - Qurayyat - Sur Road	Wadi Adai Junction	Bilad Sur Roundabout	Muscat , Ash Sharqiyah North, Ash Sharqiyah South	189	117.4
A3	al Buraimi - Mahda - al Rauda Road	al Buraimi Hospital Roundabout	al Rauda ( N6 - R/A 31)	Al Buraimi	80	49.7
A4	al Buraimi - Hafit Road	al Buraimi Hospital Roundabout	Hafit ( N2 - R/A 380)	Al Buraimi	66	41
A5	Sohar - Yanqul - Ibri Road	Sohar Interchange ( N5 - Exit 225)	al Dariz (A6 - R/A 139)	Al Batinah North, Al Dhahirah	141	87.6
A6	Musannah - Rustaq - Muskin - Ibri Road	al Miladda ( N5 - R/A 113)	Ibri - ( N2 - Junction 123)	Al Batinah South, Al Dhahirah	163	101.3
A7	Barka - Rustaq Road	Barka Interchange (A1 - Exit 79)	Rustaq ( A6 - Junction 40)	Al Batinah South, Al Dhahirah	86	53.4
A8	Izki - Sinaw - Duqm Road	Izki Interchange ( N2 - Exit 110)	Duqm R/A	Al Dhahirah, Al Wusta	444	275.9
A9	Tanum - Qarat al Milih Road	Tanum ( N9 - R/A 6)	N3 - Exit 143	Al Dhahirah, Al Wusta	206	128
A10	Haima - Duqm Road	Haima ( N3 - Junction 373)	Duqm R/A	Al Wusta	162	100.7
A11	Duqm - Hasik - Salalah Road	Duqm Airport Roundabout	Salalah (al Dahariez)	Al Wusta, Dhofar	637	395.8
A12	Haima - Marmul -Thumrait Road	Haima ( N3 - Junction 393)	Thumrait ( N3 - R/A 790)	Dhofar	414	257.2
A13	Khasab - Tibat Road	Khasab	Tibat (Oman-UAE border crossing)	Musandam	49	30.4

== See also ==
- Transport in Oman
- National roads in Oman
- Secondary roads in Oman
- Distributor roads in Oman
