= National roads in Oman =

National Roads in Oman
- Marker for the N5

System information
- Length: 2,755 km (1,712 mi)

Highway names
- National Roads: Nxx

System links
- Transport in Oman

National roads in Oman are highly important roads which connect major cities. They form the highest category in the Omani route numbering system and are designated with route numbers beginning with "N", from N1 to N10.

The national road system was established on December 18th, 2019 by the Ministry of Transport (now the Ministry of Transport, Communications and Information Technology), through the Road Numbering and Classification Guide. The guide outlined ten national roads detailing their official classification, names, start and end point and distances.

== Definition ==
According to the 2017 Road Design Guide, national roads are required to meet the following standards:

- Serve long-distance travel
- Accommodate high-speed travel
- Connect major cities together, including airports and ports
- Link strategic international border crossings to the governorates
- Form a self-contained interconnected network that provides fast and safe transportation between major areas

== List of national roads ==
Road number	Official Road name	Start point	End point	Governorates	km	mi
N1	Muscat/Batinah Expressway	Qurum Interchange	Khatmat Malaha (N5 - Exit 308)	Muscat, Al Batinah South, Al Batinah North	324	201.3
N2	Sultan Thuwaini bin Said Road	Burj as Sahwa Roundabout	Hafit (Oman-UAE border crossing)	Muscat, Ad Dakhiliyah, Al Dhahirah, Al Buraimi	383	238
N3	Sultan Said bin Taymur Road	Nizwa Interchange (N2 - Exit 134)	Salalah (R/A 855)	Ad Dakhiliyah, Al Wusta, Dhofar	855	531.2
N4	Sultan Turki bin Said Road	Bidbid Interchange (N2 - Exit 35)	Bilad Sur Roundabout	Ad Dakhiliyah, Ash Sharqiyah North, Ash Sharqiyah South	243	151
N5	Sultan Qaboos bin Said Road	Wadi Adai Interchange	Khatmat Malaha	Muscat, Al Batinah South, Al Batinah North	306	190
N6	Sohar - al Buraimi Road	Falaj al Qabayil Interchange (N5 - Exit 241)	Khatm al Shakla (Oman–UAE border crossing)	Al Batinah North, Al Buraimi	80	49.7
N7	al Aqar - al Wajaja - al Rauda Road	al Aqar (N5 - R/A 290)	al Rauda (Oman–UAE border crossing)	Al Batinah North, Al Buraimi	45	28
N8	Thumrait - al Mazyuna Road	Thumrait (N3 - R/A 790)	al Mazyuna (Oman-Yemen border crossing)	Dhofar	194	120.5
N9	Salalah - Dhalkut Road	Salalah (N3 - R/A 855)	Dhalkut (Oman-Yemen border crossing)	Dhofar	169	105
N10	Ibri - Rub' al Khali Road	Ibri (N2 - R/A 260)	Rub' al Khali (Oman-Saudi Arabia border crossing)	Al Dhahirah	156	97

== See also ==
- Transport in Oman
- Arterial roads in Oman
- Secondary roads in Oman
- Distributor roads in Oman
