= Al Musanaah =

- Wilayat
- Country: Oman
- Governorate: Al Batinah South

Population (2020)
  - Total: 55,796

Al Musanaah is a Wilayat of Al Batinah South in the Sultanate of Oman.
