= Muqshin =

Muqshin مقشن
- Wilayat
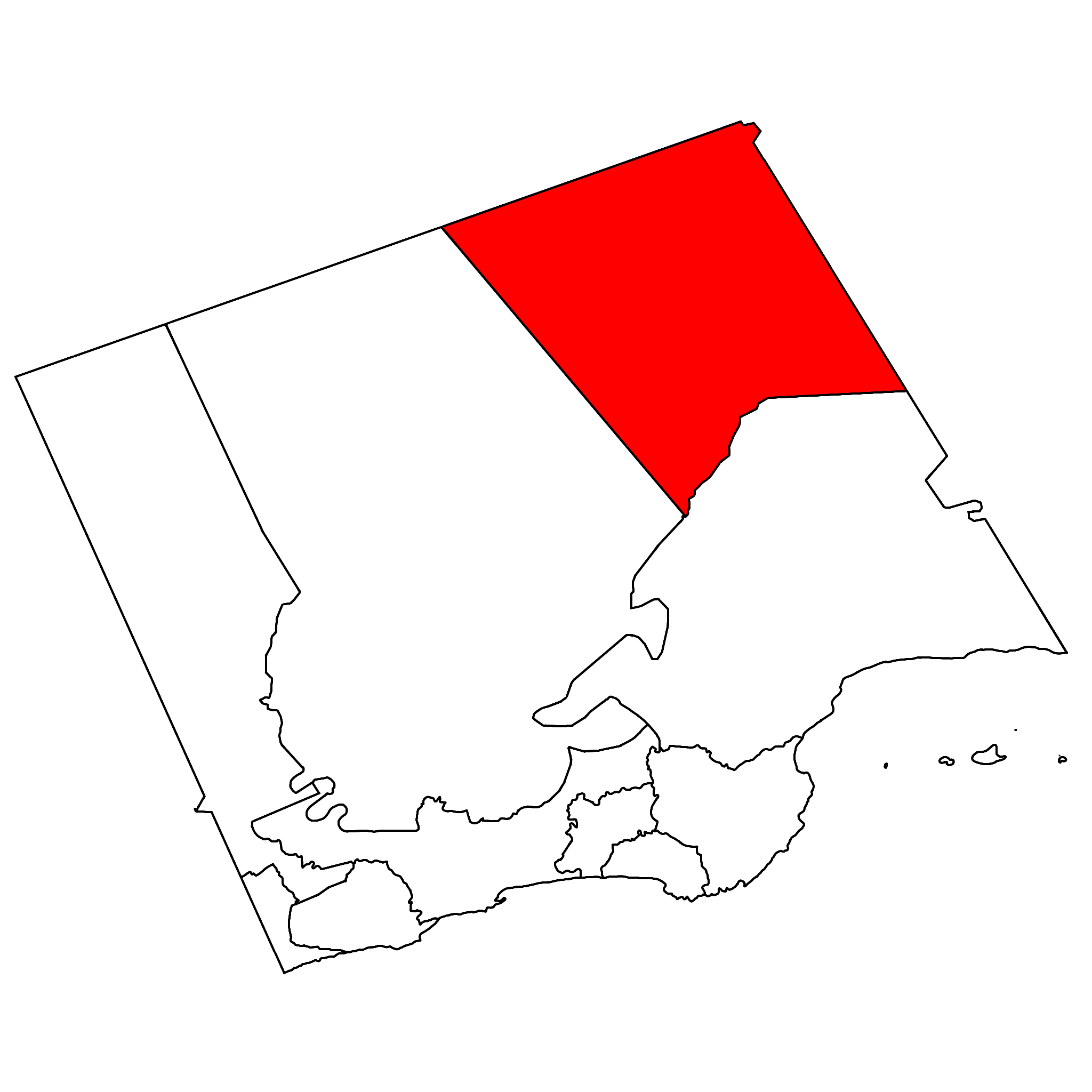
- The wilayat of Muqshin in the Dhofar Governorate

- Muqshin's location in Oman
- Coordinates: 19°17′49″N 54°46′30″E
- Country: Oman
- Governorate: Dhofar

Population (2020)
  - Total: 628

Muqshin is a wilayat or province of Dhofar Governorate in the Sultanate of Oman. It is located in the northeastern corner of the Dhofar Governorate, on the southeastern outskirts of the Empty Quarter desert, adjacent to the international border with the Kingdom of Saudi Arabia. It is 345 kilometers from the city of Salalah and is connected to the main asphalt road that connects the Dhofar Governorate to the rest of the Sultanate’s regions.

The state of Muqshin is distinguished from the rest of the states of the Dhofar Governorate in that its niyabats offices are located in a desert area covered with sand dunes, which are an extension of the sands of the Rub’ al-Khali desert.

The state of Muqshin includes three niyabats: the niyabats of Al-Mashash, the niyabats of Mandir Al-Dhabyan, and the niyabats of Marsoud, two regions (Al-Manadir and Al-Muntasir), and two administrative centers, Farsha Qatbit Center and Kadra Qatbit Center, in addition to Qatbit Rest House, which is considered a gathering and resting point for travelers and lovers of trips and camping.

== Muqshin's Three Niyabats ==
=== The Niyabat of Mashash ===
It is considered one of the desert Niyabat located in the middle of the sand dunes of the Rub’ al-Khali desert. It is characterized by its moderate weather in the winter, which tends to get cold at night, making the opportunity to exploit its location and weather in this season for the purposes of hiking and traveling a special advantage for the people of the governorate and its visitors.

=== The Niyabat of Mandir Al-Dhabyan ===
It is characterized by its soft sand dunes and its distinctive desert wildlife, which constitute a tourist attraction for enthusiasts of desert trekking and camping, especially in the winter, like other desert areas in the Arabian Peninsula.

=== The Niyabat of Marsoud ===
A famous ancient area with ancient population centers and a distinctive geographical location linking sand and sand. It is located at the crossroads of the provinces and neighboring border areas. A complex of three large valleys passes through it. It is considered a tourist attraction with its soft sand dunes and beautiful valleys with desert Ghaf trees. It has some therapeutic sulfur artesian wells with oases of palm trees, such as Al Montaser Bar, have some agricultural projects, such as the Million Palm Trees Project.

== Natural Attractions ==
=== Groundwater in the middle of the desert ===
Although the state is considered a desert, it is characterized by the abundance of groundwater as it is the main meeting point for many valleys heading from the Dhofar mountain range and the Najd region to the depth of the desert, which is considered its natural extension. This distinguished location has made the state a destination for many travelers and a main route for commercial caravans throughout the ages. It is a tourist attraction for enthusiasts of desert trips and sports. It is also famous for its sulfurous groundwater.

=== Ghaf tree woodland ===
Muqshin has woodlands covered in ghaf trees, as the tree grows well in dry environments. The forests and Sodom's apple plants can be found encircl the Empty Quarter
