= Wadi Bani Khaled =

- Wilayat
- Country: Oman
- Governorate: Ash Sharqiyah North

Population (2020)
  - Total: 13,024

Wadi Bani Khaled is a Wilayat of Ash Sharqiyah North in the Sultanate of Oman.
