= Al Batinah South Governorate =

Governorate of Oman

Coordinates: 23.390833°N 57.424444°E

Al Batinah South محافظة جنوب الباطنة
- Governorate
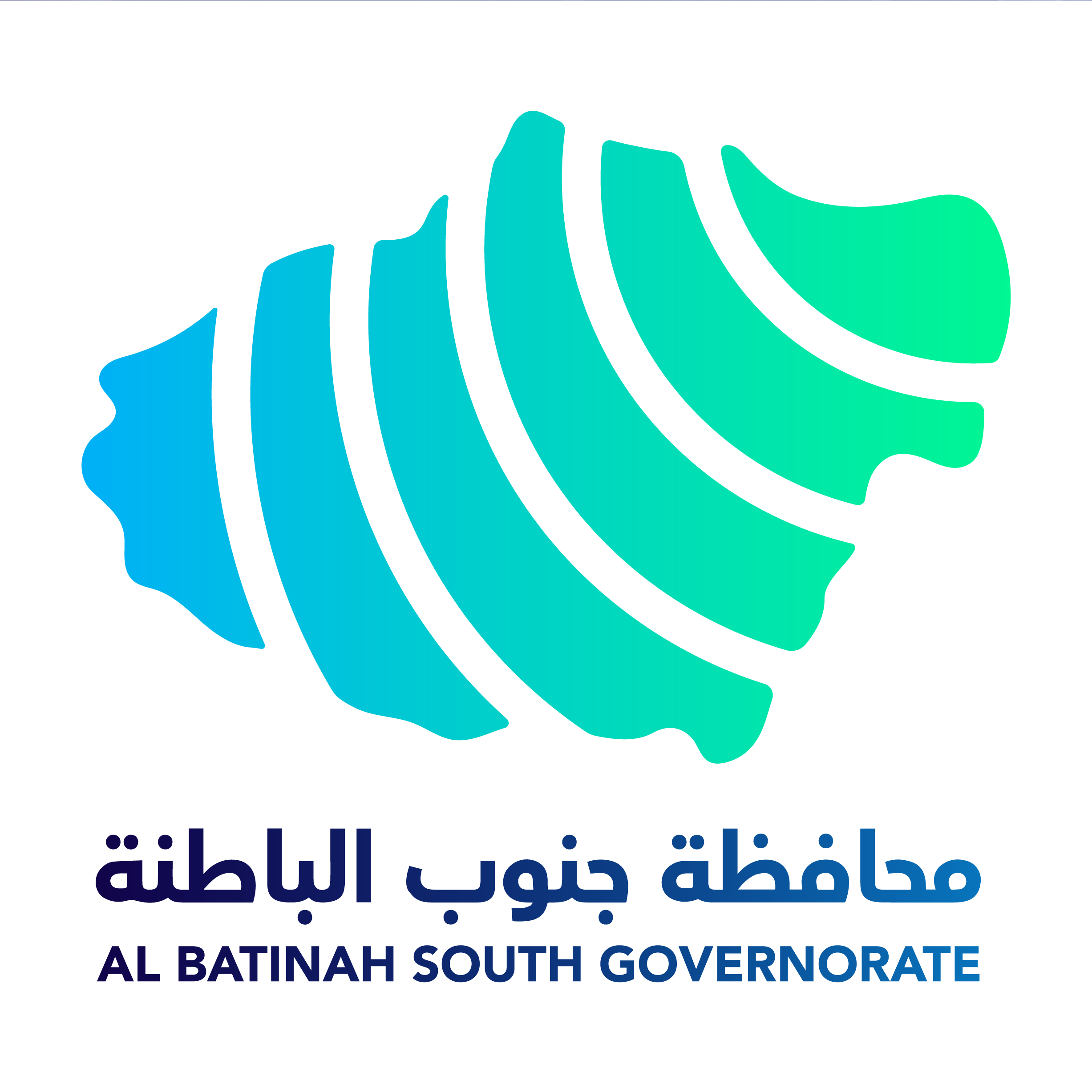
- Logo

- Al Batinah South, Governorate of Oman
- Country: Oman
- Seat: Rustaq

Government
  - Governor: Saif bin Hameer bin Mohammed Al Shuhi

Area
  - Total: 3,500 km^{2} (1,400 sq mi)

Population (July 2020)
  - Total: 465,550
  - Density: 355.4/km^{2} (920/sq mi)
- ISO 3166 code: OM-BJ

Al Batinah South Governorate (Arabic: محافظة جنوب الباطنة Muḥāfaẓat Ǧanūb al-Bāṭinah) is one of the eleven governorates of Oman. It was created on 28 October 2011 when Al Batinah Region was split into Al Batinah North Governorate and Al Batinah South Governorate. The centre of the governorate is the wilayat of Rustaq.

== Provinces ==
Al Batinah South Governorate consists of six provinces (wilayat):

- Rustaq
- Al Awabi
- Nakhal
- Wadi Al Maawil
- Barka
- Al-Musannah

== Demographics ==
Historical population
Census year	Pop.	±% p.a.
1993	206,199	—
2003	244,542	+1.72%
2010	289,008	+2.42%
2020	465,550	+4.88%
Source: Citypopulation
