= Wadi Al Maawil =

- Wilayat
- Interactive map of Wadi Al Maawil
- Coordinates: 23.44545°N 57.80930°E
- Country: Oman
- Governorate: Al Batinah South

Population (2020)
  - Total: 20,206

Wadi Al Maawil is a province (wilayat) of Al Batinah South Governorate in the Sultanate of Oman. It is located in the interior of the country south of Barka, many people confuse it as a part of Barka itself.
