= N3 road (Oman) =

National Road N3
- Sultan Said bin Taimur Road
- N3 highlighted in red
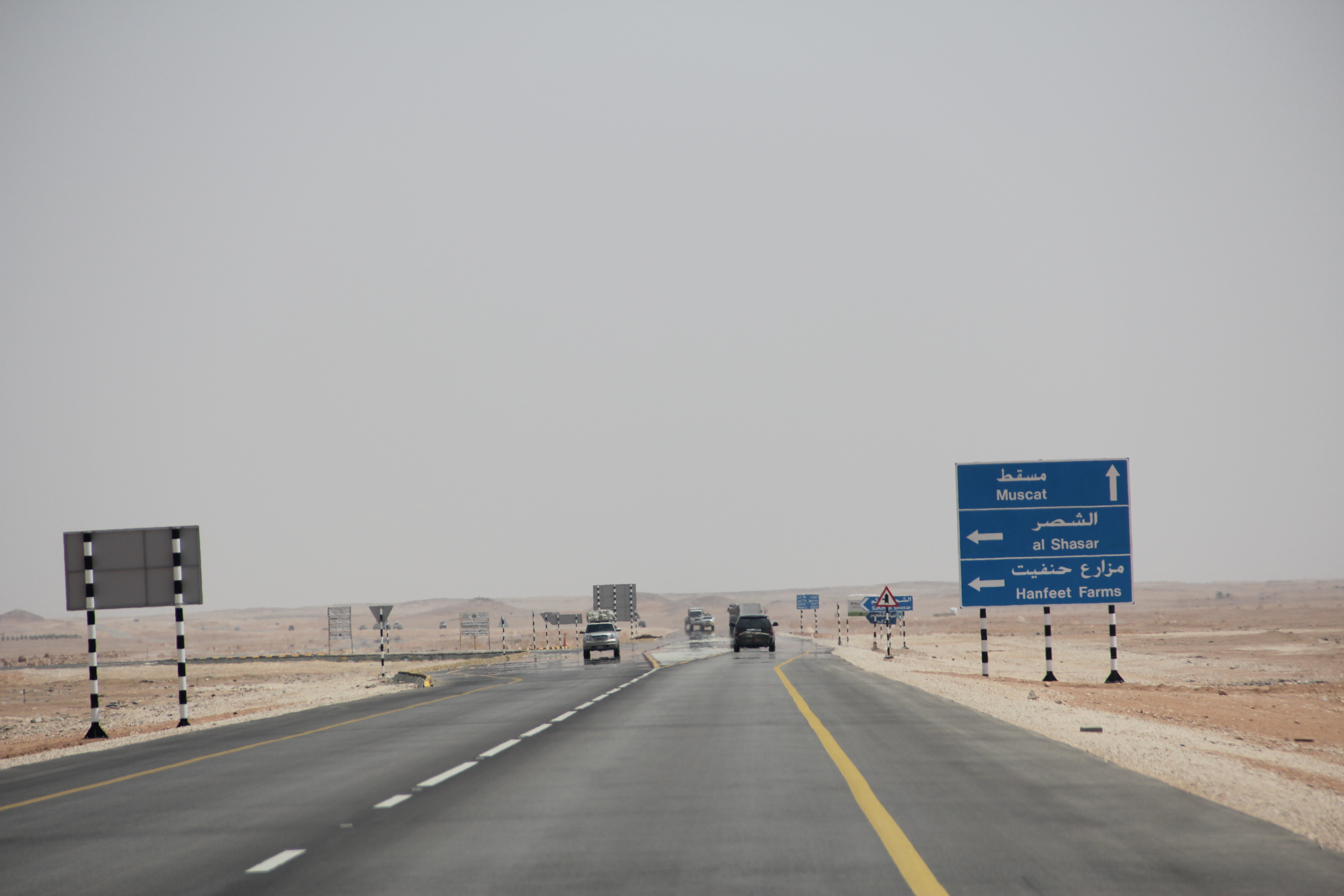
- The N3 near Thumrait

Route information
- Part of
- Length: 855 km (531 mi)
- Existed: 1982–present

Major junctions
- North end: Firq Traffic Lights, Nizwa
- S30 - Izki - Nizwa - Bahla Road; N2 - Sultan Thuwaini bin Said Road; D517 - Karsha- Manah Road; S32 - Zukait - Manah Road; D506 - al Musaidrah - al Arf Road; S33 - Jabrin - Bisyah - Habbi - Adam Road; D502 - al Nuhaydah - Ras al Jabal Road; S38 - Adam Road; A9 - Tan'am - Qarat al Milh Road; S42 - Al Kamil Wal Wafi - Al Ashkhirah - Mahout - Al Zamaim Road; D703 - Haima - Sahmah Road; A10 - Haima - Duqm Road; A12 - Haima - Marmul - Thumrait Road; N8 - Thumrait - al Mazyunah Road; D801 - Thumrait Street; S44 - Qayrun Hayriti - Taqah Road; S45 - Salalah - Taitam - Qayrun Hayriti Road; D809 - Sahnawt Road; S46 - al Saada - al Rubat Street
- South end: Hamrair Roundabout, Salalah

Location
- Country: Oman
- Major cities: Nizwa, Manah, Adam, Haima, Thumrait, Salalah

Highway system
- Transport in Oman

The N3, also officially known as Sultan Said bin Taimur Road (Arabic: طريق السلطان سعيد بن تيمور) and colloquially referred to as Nizwa - Salalah Road (Arabic: طريق نزوى - صلالة), is a national road in the Sultanate of Oman. Formerly designated as Route 31 (Arabic: طريق ٣١), it is the primary road connecting the Dhofar Governorate and Al Wusta Governorate with the northern regions of the country. At 855 kilometers in length, it is also the longest highway in the sultanate.

== History ==
On 9 December 1980, a royal decree was signed to officially establish the road. The royal decree detailed the importance of the road linking the north and south of the Sultanate while also serving oil fields and fresh water wells.

The highway was officially opened as a two-lane single carriageway on the 13 January 1982 by Sultan Qaboos bin Said.

In 2013, the Ministry of Transport and Communications announced a project to convert the road into a four-lane Dual carriageway. As of 2025, a large portion of the project has been completed, with the only remaining section being the stretch of road between Haima and Thumrait.

In 2019, the Ministry of Transport issued a new Road Numbering and Classification Guide, which included the reclassification of Route 31 as the N3.

In January 2025, royal directives were issued in Oman to change names of several roads, including the N3, which was officially renamed Sultan Said bin Taimur Road.

== See also ==
- Transport in Oman
