= Suwayq =

Province in Al Batinah North, Oman

As Suwayq السويق
- Province
- Location in Oman
- Coordinates: 23°50′58″N 57°26′19″E
- Country: Oman
- Governorate: Al Batinah North

Population
  - Total: 170,000
- Time zone: UTC+4 (+4)

Al Suwaiq (Arabic: السويق) is a coastal wilayah (province) in Al Batinah North Governorate, in northeastern Oman. The province has historically been an economic hub, attracting residents from the surrounding areas, its strategic location facilitating trade and commerce.

As of 2021, the population of Al Suwaiq stands at 140,577.

== Geography ==
Al Suwaiq province is roughly 48 km wide and 80 km long, and includes coastal areas, plains, mountains, and valleys. It is the largest wilayah in Oman, and is located 135 km from the capital, Muscat. It borders Al-Musannah to the east, Al-Khaburah to the west, the Gulf of Oman to the north, and Al-Hoqain to the south.

== Sights ==
The province is home to about 20 historic buildings (houses, castles, forts and fortresses), though most have deteriorated and are in need of restoration. These include Al Suwaiq fort, Al Tharmad fort, Al Hilal fort, Al Mghabsha fort, Al Borusheed fort, and Al Sabbara Mosque, which was built during the reign of Ahmad bin Said al-Busaidi.

=== Water Springs ===
In A'Suwaiq Wilayat, there is a considerable number of aflaj (water channels) that amount to around 31 channels. Among these aflaj, the prominent ones include Mishayq Falaj, Al Gharbi Falaj located in Al Hailain Village, Al Sharqi Falaj, and Al Mabrah Fal. Additionally, there are natural water springs, totaling about four springs. One of these springs is found in the Juhawar area, while the remaining three are situated in mountainous regions like Wadi Juhawar. One of the distinguishing features of this region is the dense cluster of trees, lending the area a garden-like appearance that complements its enchanting natural scenery.

Among the most beautiful tourist destinations are the Rulat Hulat Al Joud and Rulat Al Qarha, which are truly remarkable. The most fascinating aspect is the ancient Rulat Al Joud tree, which is over 20,095 years old. As for the other two "Rulat" trees, their ages differ. The first one, approximately 350 years old, fell due to heavy rainfall, and the second one is around 150 years old.

This area is characterized by its climate and beaches. Notably, the Al Udhaybah Beach in Al Bawarikh area, and the captivating Qarha Beach. Another prominent beach is the Khawr Al Milh Beach, which historically served as a source of salt.

=== Al Suwaiq fort ===
It mediates Al Suwaiq, in Al Suwaiq souq (old market), and the entrance of the fort facing the sea. Its rectangular shape contains three circular-shaped towers and one square shape. It is 60 meters length and 43 meters wide. Inside the fort there is a smaller fort. The fort used to be the headquarters of the governor. It was built of mud, stones and Omani plaster, and it was restored by the Ministry of Heritage and Culture in 1992.

== Villages ==
The province is home to 32 villages, including the following:

=== Al Bada'iyah ===
This village is located between Wilayat A'Suwaiq and Al-Khaburah and falls administratively under Wilayat A'Suwaiq in the Al Batinah North Governorate. It stands as one of the most vibrant villages along the route of Al Batinah North Governorate, acclaimed for its dynamic commercial and touristic activity. It holds historical significance in travel and tourism endeavors, as well as in launching trade caravans laden with fish and other commodities. The village boasts three forts and numerous heritage values. According to the 2010 statistics, the population reached 8,085 individuals.

=== Al Nabrah ===
This village is situated in the North Al Batinah Governorate and is among the key villages of A'Suwaiq Wilayat. It is bordered by the village of Hulat Al Joud to the north, Al Ruda and Al Subaikhi villages to the east, the Al Batinah Road to the south, and the village of Sur Al Hilal to the west. The population is approximately 5,000 residents. Adjacent to the village is the Al Hilal Fort, and what distinguishes this village is the historical Al Mghabsha Wall located at its entrance. In the 1940s and 1950s, this area was a hub for commercial exchange.

=== Al Mabrah ===
Al Mabrah المبرح Village is affiliated to wilayah As'Souaiq. Its location is near the Western Hajar Mountains had a population of 632 residents according to the 2010 statistics. The village's tourist appeal derives from its outstanding geographic location, the scenic views, and the geometric design of Aflaj which are coming from Wadi Al Asdani. This falaj extended to 3 km from the wadis' heart to the village. Also, it is considered as the main water source for irrigation in Al Mabrah village.

=== Al Musayfiyah ===
Situated 35 km away from the Al Batinah plain, Al Musayfiyah is surrounded by mountains from all directions except one, where a fertile valley with abundant water lies. The reason behind its name stems from "Al-Musfa," signifying a village encircled by mountains on all sides, preserving water in its valley throughout the year. Its name is derived from the diminutive form "Al-Musayfiyah." Some suggest that the name relates to a Persian marriage tradition. According to the 2010 statistics, the population of the village amounts to 83 residents.

=== Al Tharmad ===
This village is distinguished by the abundance of markets, restaurants, and commercial shops. It is also home to numerous schools and mosques, as well as a health center. The historical Al Tharmad Fort is situated in this village, characterized by its four towers. The fort used to serve as a seat of governance and administration for the wilayat. According to the 2010 statistics, the population of this village amounted to 3,685 individuals.

=== Al Hailain ===
Al Hailain (الحيلين) Village is one of the mountainous villages located approximately 35 km away from Al Khadra Village. According to the 2010 statistics, its population reached 1,223 individuals. Also it is considered one of the tourism spots during rain season.

=== Badt ===
Budt (بدت) is located approximately 40 km away from the main road. It is characterized by numerous water springs and water channels known as "Aflaj." According to the 2010 statistics, its population amounts to 240 individuals.

=== Wadiyat Al Hadhriyah ===
Numerous villages are located near Wadiyat Al Hadhriyah الودية الحدرية. These include Al Mabrah and Wadiyat Al 'Ulya to the north, Al Musayfiyah to the south, and Al Hailain to the west. The population of Wadiyat Al Hadhriyah is 114 individuals according to the 2010 statistics.

=== Hazm Freij ===
Hazm Freij (هزم فريج) is surrounded by Al Mabrah to the north, Wadiyat Al Hadhriyah to the east, Al Musayfiyah to the south, and Al Hailain to the west. The population of Hazm Freij is 74 individuals according to the 2010 statistics.

=== Al Subaykhi ===
Al Subaykhi الصبيخي is located along the Al Batinah Road, which borders it to the south. It is surrounded by various villages, including Bat'ha Al Hilal to the east and Al Nabrah to the south. The village is also home to several mosques. According to the 2010 statistics, its population is 5,254 individuals.

=== Mishayq ===
Mishayq is a residential area situated within A'Suwaiq Wilayat, which falls under the North Al Batinah Governorate in the Sultanate of Oman. According to the 2010 census conducted by the National Center for Statistics and Information, its population is estimated at 178 individuals. The area is identified by the code 60630270.

=== Mishayq Bani Khuroos ===
These are characterized by natural landmarks that bring together lofty mountains and sandy dunes.

=== Al Manfash ===
Al Manfash المنفش is a residential area located within A'Suwaiq Wilayat, which is part of the North Al Batinah Governorate in the Sultanate of Oman. According to the 2010 census conducted by the National Center for Statistics and Information, its population is estimated at 2,056 individuals. The area is identified by the code 60620072

Al Misannah

Al Misannah المسنة is a residential area located within A'Suwaiq Wilayat, which is part of the North Al Batinah Governorate in the Sultanate of Oman. According to the 2010 census conducted by the National Center for Statistics and Information, its population is estimated at 552 individuals. The area is identified by the code 60620091.

=== Al Mutamar ===
Al Mutamarاالمعتمر is a residential area located within A'Suwaiq Wilayat, which is part of the North Al Batinah Governorate in the Sultanate of Oman. According to the 2010 census conducted by the National Center for Statistics and Information, its population is estimated at 468 individuals. The area is identified by the code 60640190.

=== Bawarh ===
Al Bawarh البوارحis characterized by its stunning landscapes, which include picturesque plains, fertile farmlands, and the sight of boats moored along the shore or sailing on the sea. It is also home to Al Bawarikh Fort, a historic fort with origins dating back to pre-Islamic times. The village is known for its harmonious and beautiful coastal architecture, showcasing a blend of both traditional and modern buildings. The majority of its residents engage in agriculture and fishing, in addition to various government and public services. The population of Al Bawarikh is predominantly from the Al Barhi tribe, as well as other tribes such as Al Balushi, Al Qarini, Al Maqbali, Al Hindasi, Al Daba'oni, and Al 'Araymi.

=== Al Bardah ===
Al Bardah الباردة is a residential area located within A'Suwaiq Wilayat, which falls under the North Al Batinah Governorate in the Sultanate of Oman. According to the 2010 census conducted by the National Center for Statistics and Information, its population is estimated at 711 individuals. The area is identified by the code 60620073.

=== Al Haur ===
Al Haur الحور is a residential area situated within A'Suwaiq Wilayat, which is part of the North Al Batinah Governorate in the Sultanate of Oman. According to the 2010 census conducted by the National Center for Statistics and Information, its population is estimated at 457 individuals. The area is identified by the code 60630303.

=== Other villages ===
- Al Afrad
- Sur Al Hilal
- Bat'ha Al Hilal
- Hulat Al Joud
- Al Ruda
- Al Khadra Village
- Wadiyat Al 'Ulya
- Juhawar
- Suwaiq
- Khadra Al Sa'ad
- Khadra Al Bu Rashid
- Dhayan Al Busaid
