= Al-Musannah =

- Location in Oman
- Coordinates: 23°46′36″N 57°38′32″E
- Country: Oman
- Subdivision: Al Batinah South Governorate

Population (2020)
  - Total: 99,204

Al-Musannah or Al-Mussanah (Arabic: المصنعة) is a town and province in the Batinah Region of northern Oman. As of 2020 Census, it had a population of 99,204. Al-Musannah is a coastal town located in the South Al Batinah Governorate of Oman. It is known for its scenic beaches and is a popular destination for both locals and tourists.

== See also ==
- Oman
