= Saham =

- Town
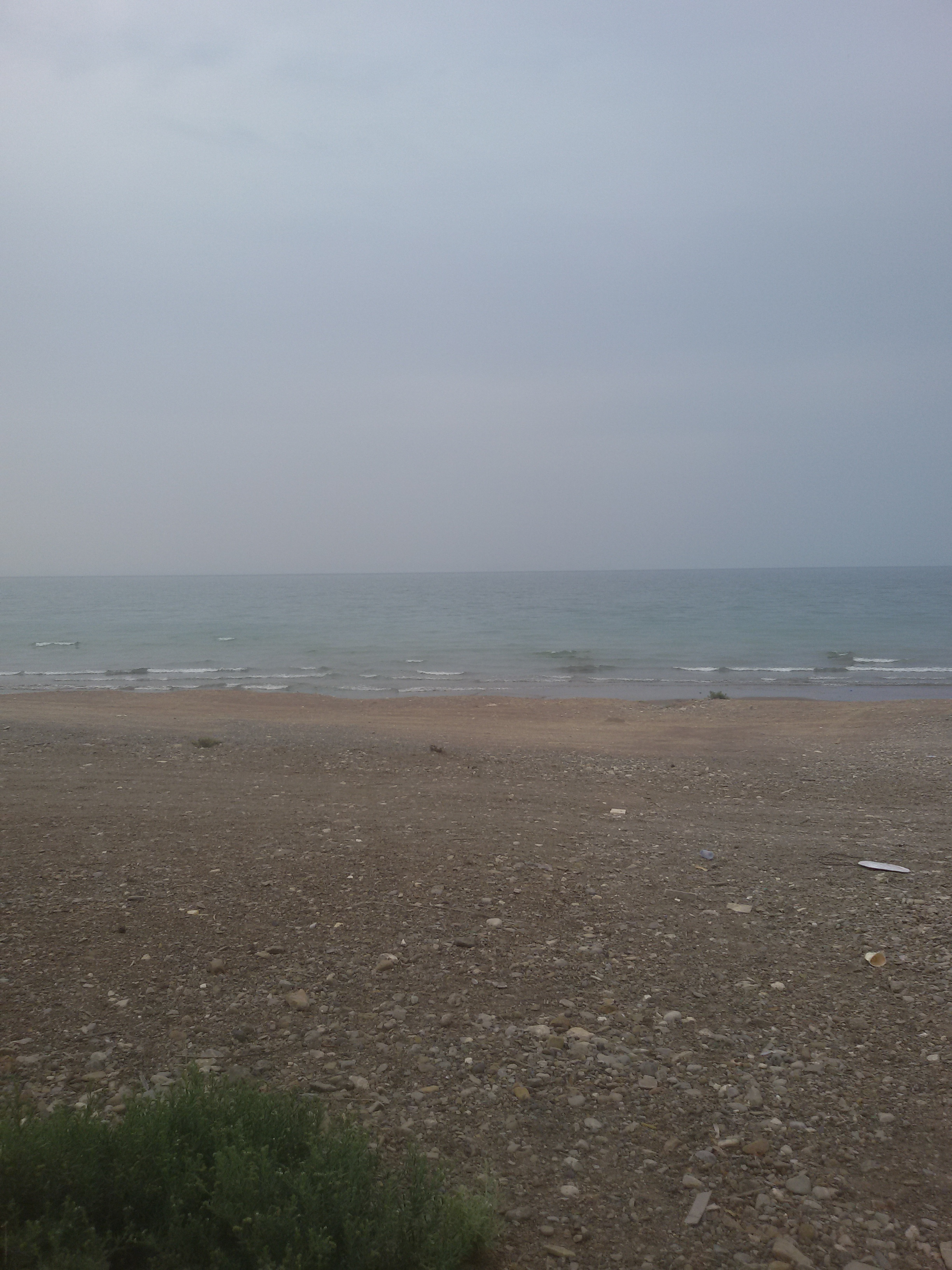
- Beach in the state of Saham, Sultanate of Oman

- Location in Oman
- Coordinates: 24°10′20″N 56°53′19″E
- Country: Oman
- Region: Al Batinah Region

Population (2017)
  - Total: 140,000
- Time zone: UTC+4 (+4)

Saham (Arabic: صحم) is a coastal town in Al Batinah North Governorate, in northeastern Oman. As of 2017, its population was 147,775. The main industries are fishing and farming. Saham province is located between Al Khaboura and Sohar provinces.

== Saham Fort and Souq ==
The best known landmarks in Saham are its historic souq and fort. The souq was renovated to modern standards in 2018. It hosts a regular market where farm owners bring their livestock for sale on the seventh day of Dhu al-Hijja, three days before Eid Al Adha, where sacrificial lambs can be bought for the holiday.

== Regions ==
Saham is one of the largest provinces in Al Batinah North Governorate in terms of area. It contains several regions, including the northern regions of Majaz, Al-Huwail, Al-Marfa, Al-Hadeeb, Al-Gowaisa as well as two southern regions of Al-Deel and Hafeet. Along the shore, fjords are common, and the areas surrounding them are named khors (such as Khor Al Milh, Khor AlHimam, Khor AlShiyadi). The region surrounding the souq was named after it (Hillat AlSouq) marking its importance in the province.

== See also ==
- List of cities in Oman
