= Provinces of Oman =

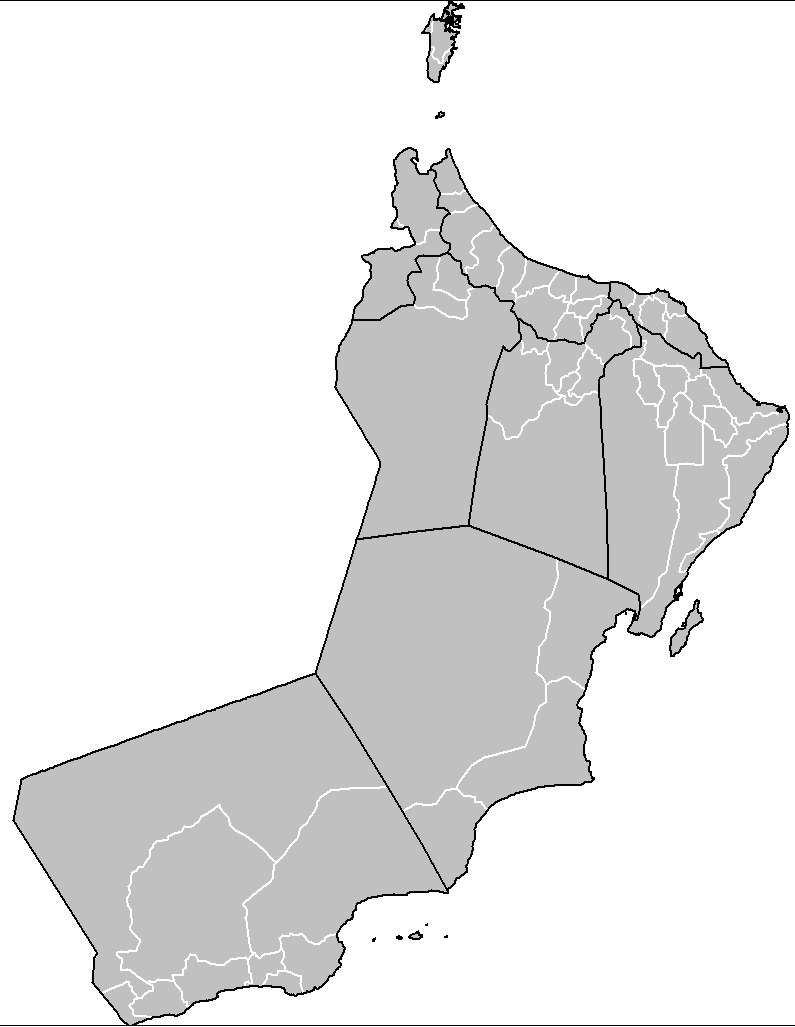
The minor (light) lines show the provincial borders and the major (dark) lines show region and governorate borders

The administrative division of Oman contains eleven governorates (muhafazat), and within the governorates, Oman is sub-divided into 63 provinces (wilayat).

== Ad Dakhiliyah Governorate ==
Province	Population (2022)
Nizwa	139,267
Bahla	96,415
Samail	87,997
Izki	66,034
Bidbid	41,482
Adam	31,850
Al Hamra	31,013
Manah	27,860
Jebel Akhdar	11,776
Total	533,694

== Ad Dhahirah Governorate ==
Province	Population (2022)
Ibri	178,234
Yanqul	28,738
Dhank	25,886
Total	232,858

== Al Batinah North Governorate ==
Province	Population (2022)
Sohar	263,894
Suwayq	200,994
Saham	165,546
Al Khaburah	89,971
Shinas	88,317
Liwa	63,292
Total	872,014

== Al Batinah South Governorate ==
Province	Population (2022)
Barka	205,175
Rustaq	129,050
Al Musanaah	108,812
Nakhal	31,809
Wadi Al Maawil	22,630
Al Awabi	20,550
Total	518,026

== Al Buraimi Governorate ==
Province	Population (2022)
Al Buraimi	113,488
Mahdah	10,917
Sunaynah	1,356
Total	125,761

== Al Wusta Governorate ==
Province	Population (2022)
Duqm	23,851
Mahout	19,033
Haima	10,500
Al Jazer	6,084
Total	59,468

== Ash Sharqiyah North Governorate ==
Province	Population (2022)
Al-Mudhaibi	92,193
Ibra	53,155
Bidiya	48,966
Sinaw	36,777
Dema Wa Thaieen	28,947
Al-Qabil	26,997
Wadi Bani Khaled	14,197
Total	264,455

== Ash Sharqiyah South Governorate ==
Province	Population (2022)
Sur	122,527
Jalan Bani Bu Ali	117,730
Jalan Bani Bu Hassan	50,755
Al Kamil Wal Wafi	42,791
Masirah	15,945
Total	349,748

== Dhofar Governorate ==
Province	Population (2022)
Salalah	388,841
Taqah	26,486
Mirbat	18,628
Thumrait	18,953
Sadah	6,356
Rakhyut	52,66
Dhalkut	3,415
Muqshin	705
Shalim and the Hallaniyat Islands	7,591
Al-Mazyunah	10,128
Total	486,369

== Muscat Governorate ==
Province	Population (2022)
Muscat (Note: Muscat refers to the province of Muscat which contains the city of Old Muscat and not the more commonly known urban area of Muscat.)	37,865
Muttrah	223,590
Bawshar	412,544
Seeb	524,696
Al Amarat	139,755
Qurayyat	63,006
Total	1,401,456

== Musandam Governorate ==
Province	Population (2022)
Khasab	33,657
Dibba (Note: Officially known as Wilayat of Dibba but sometimes referred by locals as Dibba al Bayah or Dibba Oman.)	10,714
Bukha	4,547
Madha	4,306
Total	53,224

== See also ==
- List of cities in Oman
- Regions and governorates of Oman
