= Barka, Oman =

Barka Barkāʾ (بَرْكَاء) Borca
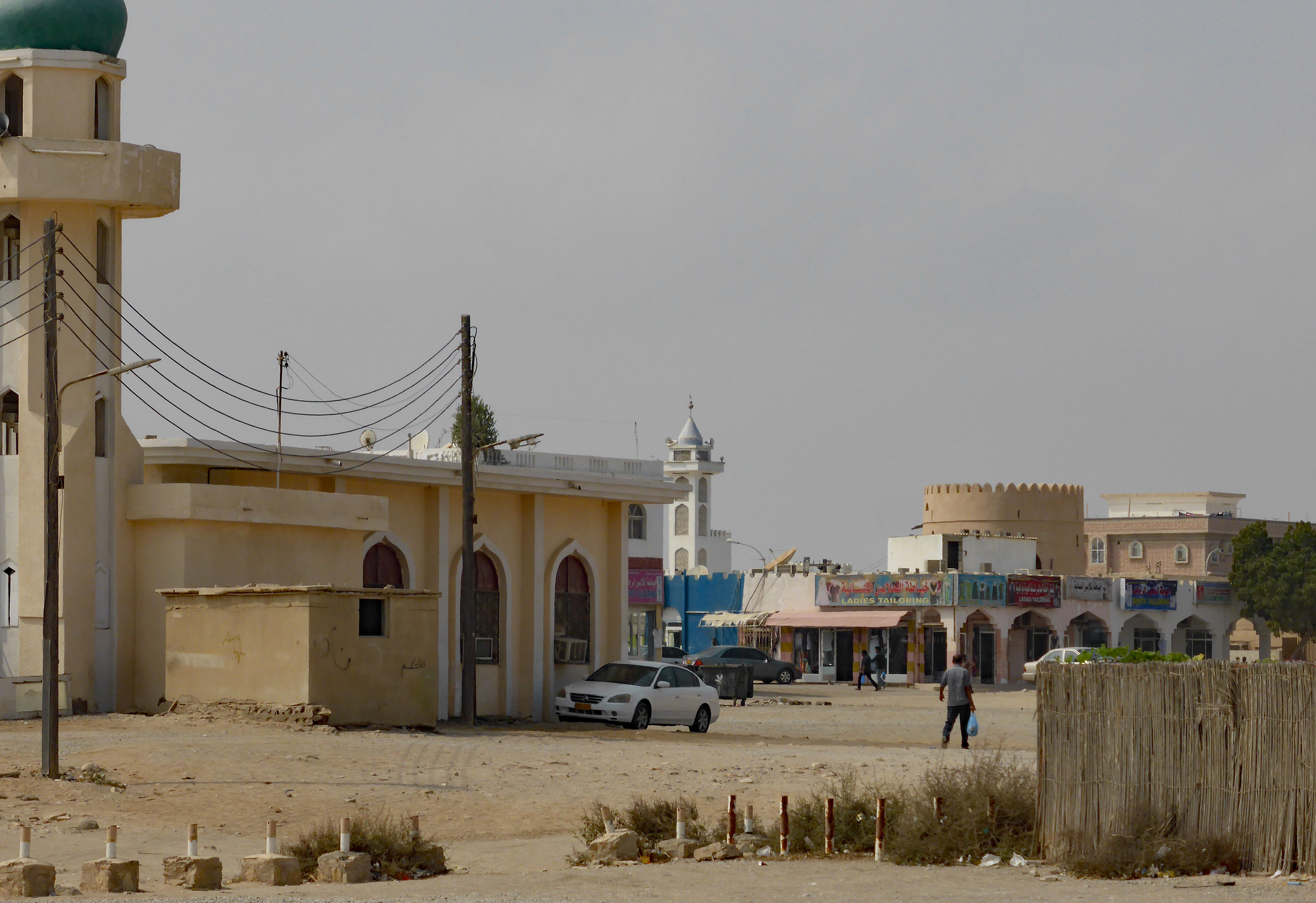

- Location in Oman Barka (Middle East) Barka (West and Central Asia)
- Coordinates: 23°41′47.1″N 57°53′16.0″E
- Country: Oman
- Subdivision: Al Batinah South Governorate

Population (2017)
  - Total: 130,000
- Time zone: UTC+4:00 United Arab Emirates Standard Time

Barka (Arabic: بَرْكَاء, romanized: Barkāʾ) is a coastal city and Wilayah (Province) in the Al Batinah South Governorate in northern Oman. Bordered by the Sea of Oman and the Hajar Mountains in southern Batinah, Barka is about a half-hour drive from As-Seeb and roughly an hour's drive from Al-Khuwair and Ruwi.

== History ==
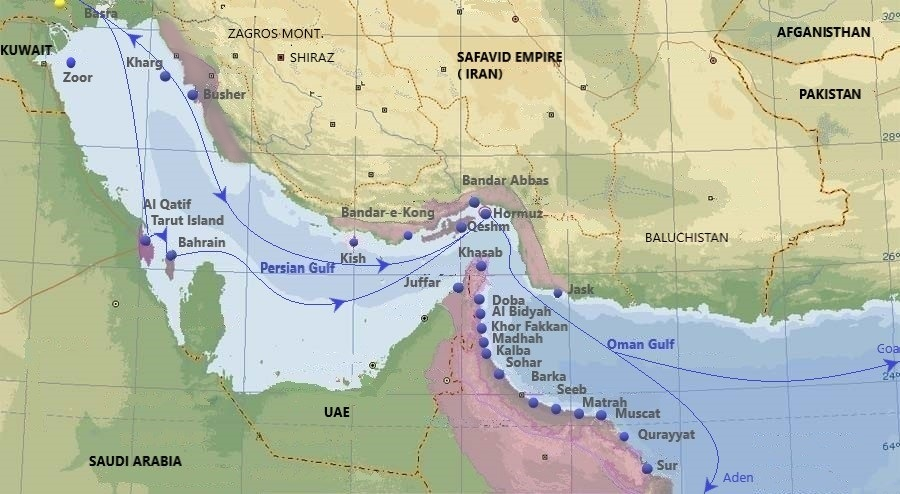
Main cities, ports and routes of the Portuguese Empire in the Persian Gulf in the 16th and 17th centuries

Barka was destroyed in 865 CE. Mohammad Taqi Khan Shirazi led a military campaign in Oman in 1738, and unsuccessfully besieged Barka on 25 May.

Construction on Barka Castle started under Saif bin Sultan and was completed during the reign of Ahmad bin Said al-Busaidi.

Barka was seized by rebels at the outbreak of the Muscat rebellion, but were driven from the town by HMS Fox and HMS Dartmouth in 1914.

== Demographics ==
Barka has a community of Indian merchants in the 1910s. A community of Al-Lawatia exist in Barka.

== Attractions ==
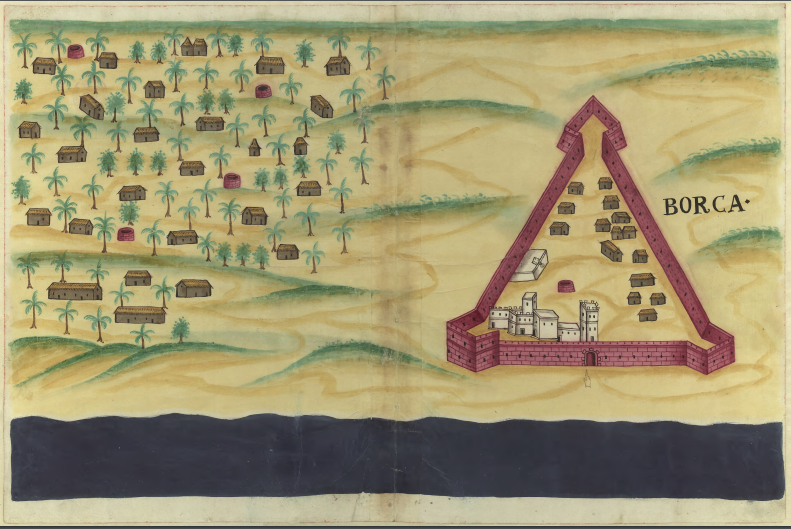
Portuguese Fortress of Barka (Borca) in a 17th-century picture. In Antonio Bocarro's book of fortresses (1632).

Nearby is Bait Na'aman (Nu'man), a four-towered fort of Imam Bil'arab bin Sultan of the 17th century, renovated in 1991.

== Economy ==
Al Bloushi, Al-Farsi, Al Zadjali, Al Habsi, Al Ajmi, Al Owaisi, Al Amri, Al Badri and Al Raisi tribes live here. The area is known for its agricultural beauty, fishing, and traditional pastimes like horse and camel racing, halwa making, and Omani-style bullfighting.

A new quarter is now under construction in Sawadi, called the Blue City. The development is 8 km from Sawadi beach, and many international companies are involved in Barka development projects. There is an estimated $15 billion in new construction currently taking place here. Barka is the site of several power and water plants, including:

- The Barka 2 water and power plant, with generation capacity of 678 MW and desalination capacity of 26.4 million gallons of potable water per day.
- The Barka 3 gas turbine power plant, with generation capacity of 744 MW, sponsored by Engie, Yonden and Sojitz.
- A new 281,000 m³/d desalination plant is to be commissioned: Itochu, Degrémont and International Power were named preferred bidders in 2015.

== See also ==
- List of cities in Oman

== Works cited ==
=== Books ===
- Sachedina, Amal (2021). Cultivating the Past, Living the Modern: The Politics of Time in the Sultanate of Oman. Cornell University Press. ISBN 9781501758621.
- Yule, Paul (2014). Cross-roads: Early and Late Iron Age South-eastern Arabia. Harrassowitz Verlag. ISBN 9783447192873.

=== Journals ===
- Lockhart, Laurence (1935). "Nādir Shāh's Campaigns in 'Omān, 1737-1744". Bulletin of the School of Oriental Studies, University of London. 8 (1). Cambridge University Press: 157–171. doi:10.2307/608108. JSTOR 608108.
- Prasad, Y. (1998). "British Interests and the Use of Indian Resources in the Persian Gulf During the Oman Revolt (1913-1920)". Proceedings of the Indian History Congress. 59. Indian History Congress: 934–943. doi:10.2307/44147066. JSTOR 44147066.
- Valeri, Marc (2010). "High Visibility, Low Profile: The Shi'a in Oman Under Sultan Qaboos". International Journal of Middle East Studies. 42 (2). Cambridge University Press: 251–268. doi:10.2307/40784725. JSTOR 40784725.

=== News ===
- "The Jewel of Barka". Oman Daily Observer. 7 November 2017. Archived from the original on 7 July 2025.
