= Rustaq =

Rustaq Ar-Rustāq (ٱلرُّسْتَاق)
- Wilayah and town
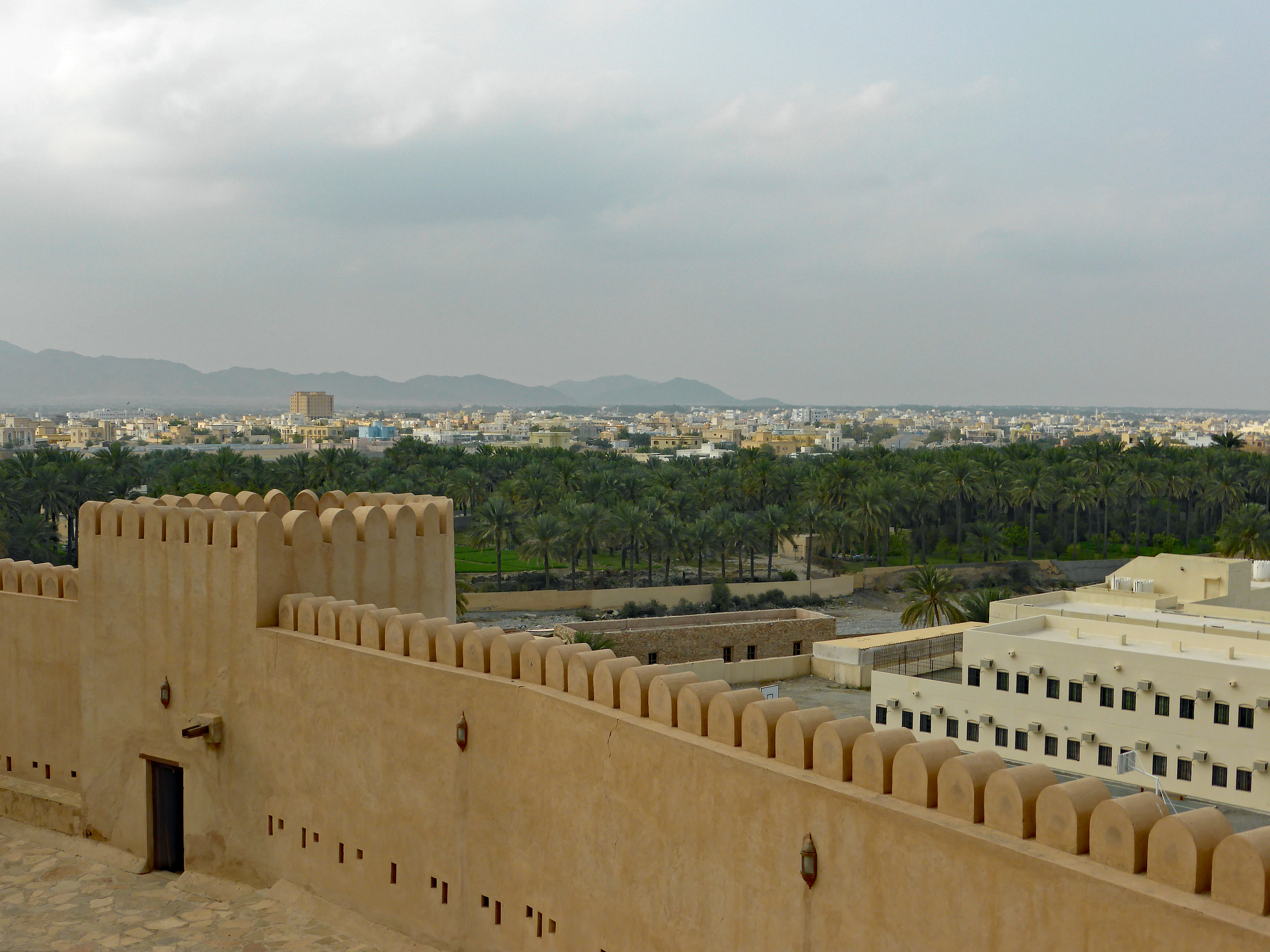
- View of the city from Rustaq Fort, with the Western Hajar Mountains in the background

- Location in Oman Rustaq (West and Central Asia)
- Coordinates: 23°23′27″N 57°25′28″E
- Country: Oman
- Governorate: Al Batinah South

Population (2017)
  - Total: 120,000

Rustaq (Arabic: ٱلرُّسْتَاق, romanized: Ar-Rustāq) is a town and Wilayah (District) in the Al Batinah South Governorate of northern Oman in the Western Hajar Mountains. Rustaq was once the capital of Oman, during the era of Imam Nasir bin Murshid al Ya'arubi.

== Administration ==
Rustaq is governed today by its own administration, and is represented by officials in offices affiliated with the province. These include the offices of Al Hawqayn (in the northern part of the province) and Wadi Bani Hani (in the western part of the province). Additionally, the province has two representatives in the Omani Shura Council, who are nominated by the province's residents during the Shura Council elections in the country.

Within the province, there are administrative centers representing various governmental service ministries, including the Primary Court, the General Directorate of Education, and the General Police Directorate. These governmental institutions, along with others, serve the neighboring provinces in the southern part of the Batinah region.

=== Divisions ===
Al-Hilah: Located to the north of Rustaq Castle and west of Al-Jazeera Sports Team's stadium.

Industrial Area: The industrial area in Rustaq includes various shops and stores for selling car parts, car repair workshops, aluminum shops, and also hosts activities related to mining, blacksmithing, and lathe work. It contains service facilities like restaurants, cafes, and grocery stores.

Al-Hazm: Situated to the north of Rustaq province, notable landmarks include Al-Hazm Fort and Al-Hazm Sports Team's stadium.

Rustaq Interior, Yaqa', Al-Jazeera, and Bil: Located to the north of Rustaq Castle.

Al-Sarh District: Situated to the west of Rustaq Castle and west of Rustaq province.

Al-Mazahit: Positioned to the north of Rustaq province and to the north of Rustaq Castle.

Jammah: Located to the northeast of Rustaq province and northeast of Al-Misfah.

Al-Nahdha.

Al-Murji: Found west of Rustaq Castle and west of Al-Sarh District.

Rustaq: Situated to the north of Rustaq Castle.

Al-Wushail: Located to the north of Rustaq and Rustaq Castle, and to the southwest of Al-Misfah.

Al-Tabaqah.

College of Applied Sciences in Rustaq: Located to the north of Rustaq province in the area of Al-Wushail.

Al-Shubaykah: Positioned north of Rustaq, and northwest of Al-Misfah in the south of Al-Hazm.

Al-Ghashb: The area is situated north of Rustaq Castle.

Falaj Al-Shurah: Found to the north of Al-Wushail.

Al-Hawqeen: This area is located to the northwest of Rustaq province, west of Al-Misfah, and to the north of Al-Sarh District.

== Economy ==
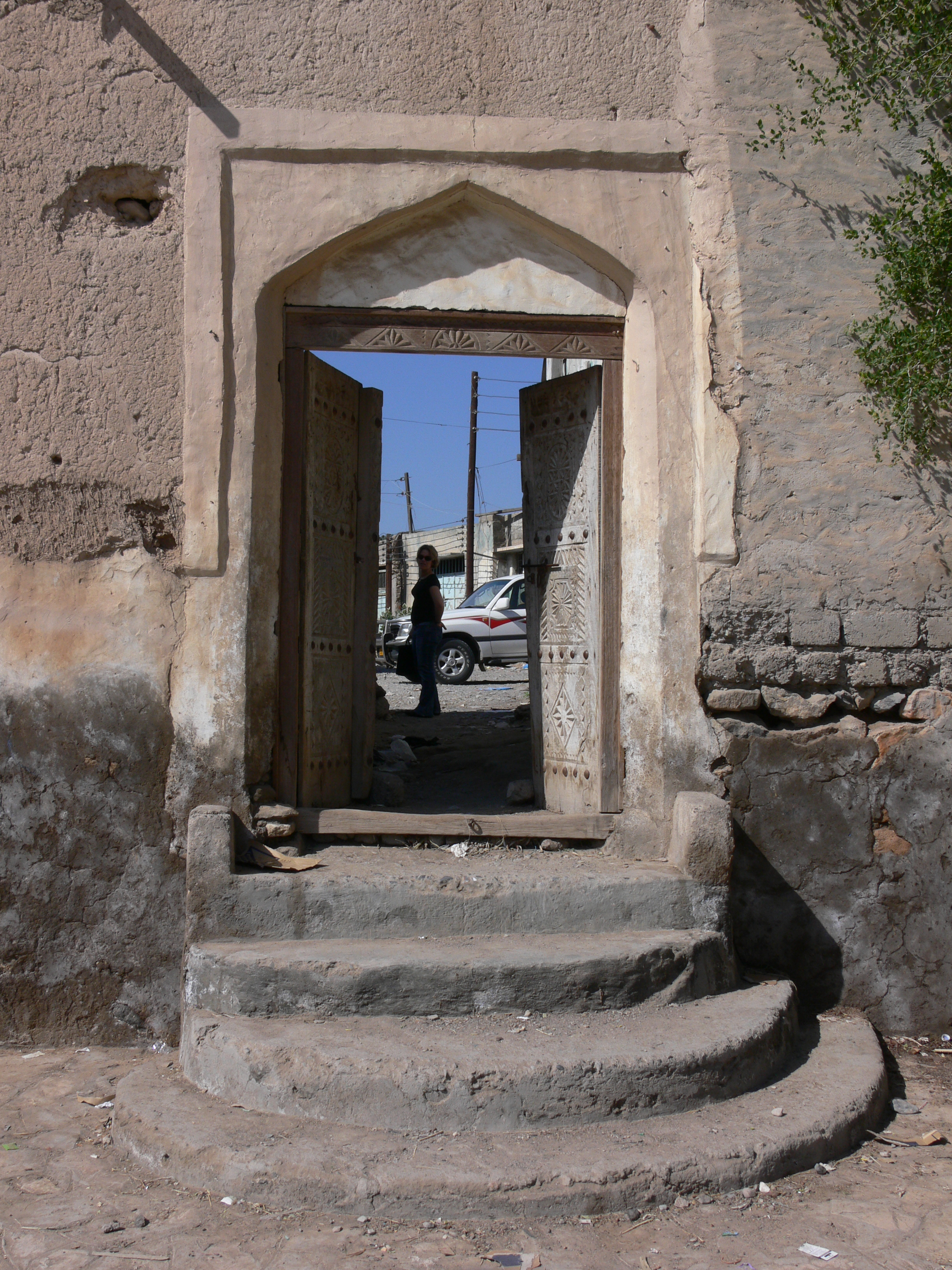
Entrance to the old souq

=== Industries ===
Industries prospered over the years due to the elementary needs of people Al Rustaq and some other states and regions in Sultanate of Oman. Al Rustaq was made by middle Iranians 40,000 years ago.

Omani Halwa is also produced in Rustaq. People come from many places in the time of Eid and other occasions to buy Halwa. Rustaqi Khanjar production has also been done in Rustaq for a very long time. Old men spend hours and hours making Omani codes. Rustaq people have long been known for their care of palm trees and their dates. They have made use of the branches and leaves to build shelter and make baskets. Leather tanning is also one of the industries in Rustaq. People use leather to save water and food, and for making shoes.

=== Traditional crafts ===
- Beekeeping: Rustaq people like beekeeping and many of them own more than 1000 cells.
- Tabseel: it means boiling dates of a specific type "Mabseli" in a particular session.
- Sheep grazing: many people graze animals especially those who live in Wadies and far away from the down town.
- Renewal of guns: Some artisans work in renewal and amendments to the traditional rifles. They upgrade them and add more modifications to improve their functionality.

=== Traditional arts ===
- Mashia: it is an introduction to Razhaa.
- Razhaa: art for the men, which started competing in raising the swords.
- Razfah: known locally as Hebiah.
- Azi: comes in the form of song.
- Al-Tareq: This is usually art at the Bedouin living in the north of the state.
- Al-hmpel: This is usually when the Bedouin art and residents east of the state said when moving from one place to another via camels.

=== Agriculture ===
The state is famous for the cultivation of different types of palm including: Khalas, Zabad, Hilali, Al-Mabsli Obo Soih, Almeznaj, Subaa Al-Aroos and Jabri. It is also known for the cultivation of citrus and quince, lemon, Albalnj Alchkak and Nadan, as well as Almstafl and olives (guava), mango (Alamba), bananas and papaya and clover, in addition to seasonal crops such as maize, barley, Algeljlan, onions and garlic.

== Education ==
The College of Education in Rustaq is located in Al-Batinah South region within the Rustaq province. It falls under the Western Hajar governorates. It is bordered to the east by Al Awabi province, to the west by Ibri province, to the south by the Green Mountain, Nizwa, and Al Hamra, and to the north by Al Masnaah and Al Suwaiq provinces.

The college offers academic departments in the Teacher Preparation Program for English language, mathematics, physics, chemistry, and biology. These programs started in the academic year 2016/2017.

There are also two applied programs: the International Business Management program, which started in the academic year 2008/2009, and the Information Technology program, which began in the academic year 2009/2010. Both programs offer four specializations that students can choose from after completing their second year. In the International Business Management program, the specializations include International Business Management, Accounting, Tourism, and Hospitality. For the Information Technology program, the specializations include Software Development, Information Technology Security, Computer Networks, and Data Management.

== Etymology ==
The name of this town is a derived from the Middle Iranian rōstāg, meaning "district" (also in Baluchi, Persian, Kumzari, etc.), New Iranian rusta, meaning a 'large village.' The term is a cognate to other Indo-European tongues such as Latin, where 'rustica', means the same thing (whence the source for the English term, 'rustic').

== Geography ==
Rustaq is located amidst the Hajar Mountains, and they surround the city from all directions except the northern side. This northern side is the direction from which the city opens up to the coastal regions in the area of Al-Batinah (including Al-Musannah and Al-Suwayq), which is the most active and important vital passage in the region. It is also considered a link connecting the city to the Omani capital, Muscat, which is only 160 km away. Rustaq is also distinguished by its rocky and sandy desert environment in the northeastern direction.

=== Climate ===
Climate data for Rustaq, elevation 322 m (1,056 ft), (1991–2020 normals, extremes 2002–2023)
Month	Jan	Feb	Mar	Apr	May	Jun	Jul	Aug	Sep	Oct	Nov	Dec	Year
Record high °C (°F)	33.9 (93.0)	37.0 (98.6)	42.7 (108.9)	43.5 (110.3)	48.4 (119.1)	49.6 (121.3)	48.7 (119.7)	47.5 (117.5)	46.1 (115.0)	43.1 (109.6)	37.7 (99.9)	34.6 (94.3)	49.6 (121.3)
Mean daily maximum °C (°F)	25.4 (77.7)	28.3 (82.9)	32.2 (90.0)	37.4 (99.3)	42.3 (108.1)	43.6 (110.5)	43.1 (109.6)	41.8 (107.2)	40.3 (104.5)	36.8 (98.2)	31.1 (88.0)	26.7 (80.1)	35.8 (96.3)
Daily mean °C (°F)	19.5 (67.1)	21.5 (70.7)	25.0 (77.0)	30.0 (86.0)	34.9 (94.8)	36.5 (97.7)	36.3 (97.3)	34.9 (94.8)	33.2 (91.8)	29.5 (85.1)	24.8 (76.6)	20.9 (69.6)	28.9 (84.0)
Mean daily minimum °C (°F)	14.4 (57.9)	15.8 (60.4)	18.7 (65.7)	23.1 (73.6)	27.5 (81.5)	29.8 (85.6)	30.6 (87.1)	29.2 (84.6)	27.1 (80.8)	23.3 (73.9)	19.5 (67.1)	15.9 (60.6)	22.9 (73.2)
Record low °C (°F)	8.4 (47.1)	6.1 (43.0)	10.8 (51.4)	16.4 (61.5)	21.0 (69.8)	20.7 (69.3)	24.2 (75.6)	22.2 (72.0)	21.1 (70.0)	16.7 (62.1)	14.2 (57.6)	8.8 (47.8)	6.1 (43.0)
Average precipitation mm (inches)	14.0 (0.55)	13.1 (0.52)	14.3 (0.56)	10.6 (0.42)	5.8 (0.23)	8.4 (0.33)	5.0 (0.20)	1.5 (0.06)	3.0 (0.12)	12.1 (0.48)	5.3 (0.21)	11.3 (0.44)	104.4 (4.12)
Average precipitation days (≥ 1.0 mm)	1.6	1.1	1.6	1.4	0.8	0.4	0.4	0.3	0.4	1.4	1.3	1.4	12.1
Source 1: World Meteorological Organization (precipitation 1998–2009)
Source 2: Starlings Roost Weather

== History ==
During the days of the Sasanian Empire, Al-Rustaq had a Persian marzban (military governor), whom Sasanians in the area would report to. Dibba and Tuwwam, which Oman today shares with the U.A.E., were taxed by Al-Julanda, who were clients of the Sasanians. There are also historical mosques in Rustaq, including Al-Bayada Mosque, the Basra Mosque, and the Qasra Mosque.

=== Rustaq Castle ===
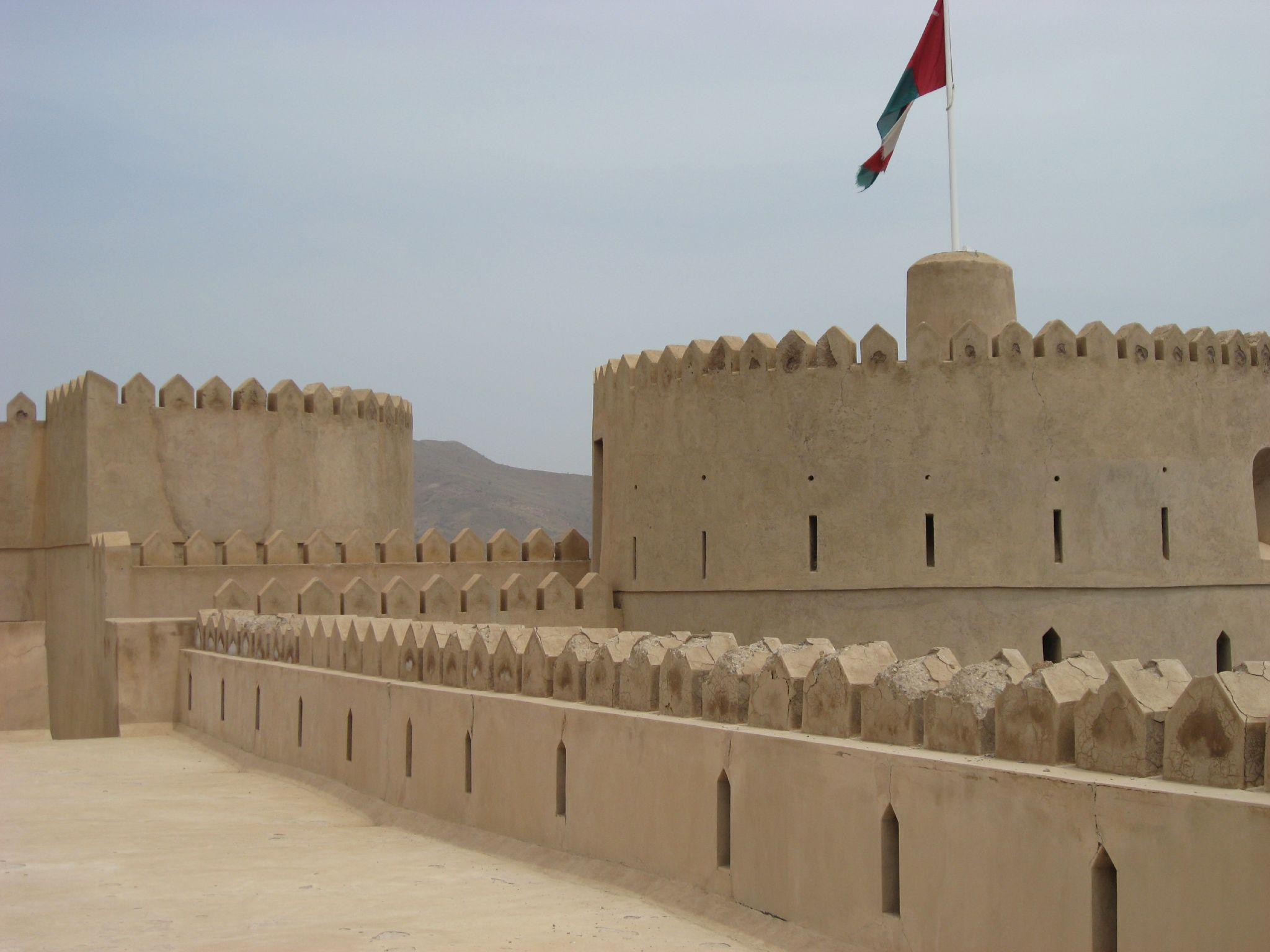
Rustaq Castle

Rustaq Fort, built four centuries prior to the 7th century C.E., is an imposing structure built on three levels, containing separate houses, an armoury, a mosque and four towers. The tallest tower stands over 18.5 m (61 ft) high, and has a diameter of 6 m (20 ft).

The Rustaq Castle (Arabic: قَلْعَة ٱلرُّسْتَاق, romanized: Qalʿat Ar-Rustāq) is located on the slopes of the Green Mountain at the edge of the Batinah plain in the Rustaq province of South Al Batinah Governorate. The castle was initially built on Persian ruins around the year 1250 AD, but the impressive current structure was rebuilt by the first Imams of the dynasty of Ya'Aruba during the period from 1624 to 1649 AD. It consists of two main floors in addition to the ground floor, featuring residences, weapon storage rooms, reception rooms, gates, a mosque, prisons, wells, and other facilities.

In Rustaq Castle, there are four towers that were constructed in the years 1477 and 1906. The first one is the "Red Tower," which stands at a height of over 16 meters and has a diameter of nine and a half meters. The second tower is the "Wind Tower," built by Imam Saif bin Sultan Al Ya'arubi, whose tomb is located in the western corner of the castle. The "Wind Tower" reaches a height of 12 meters and has a diameter of 12 meters as well, with a hundred decorative triangles surrounding its walls.

The third tower is the "Devils Tower," also built by Imam Saif bin Sultan Al Ya'arubi, and is nicknamed the "Underground Tower." It has a height of 18 and a half meters and a diameter of about six meters, with five decorative triangles encircling its walls. The fourth tower is the "Modern Tower," constructed during the reign of Imam Ahmed bin Said. It stands at a height of 11 and a half meters and is adorned with eighty decorative triangles.

Within Rustaq Castle, there are ten cannons. Four of them are in the Modern Tower, three in the Wind Tower, and the remaining three at the lower section of the castle. The castle is also equipped with four gates: Ya'Aruba Gate, Al A'la Gate, Central Gate, and Sarhah Gate.

Castle dimensions: Length 60 meters, Width 45 meters, Total area: 2700 square meters.

=== Al-Hazm Fortress ===
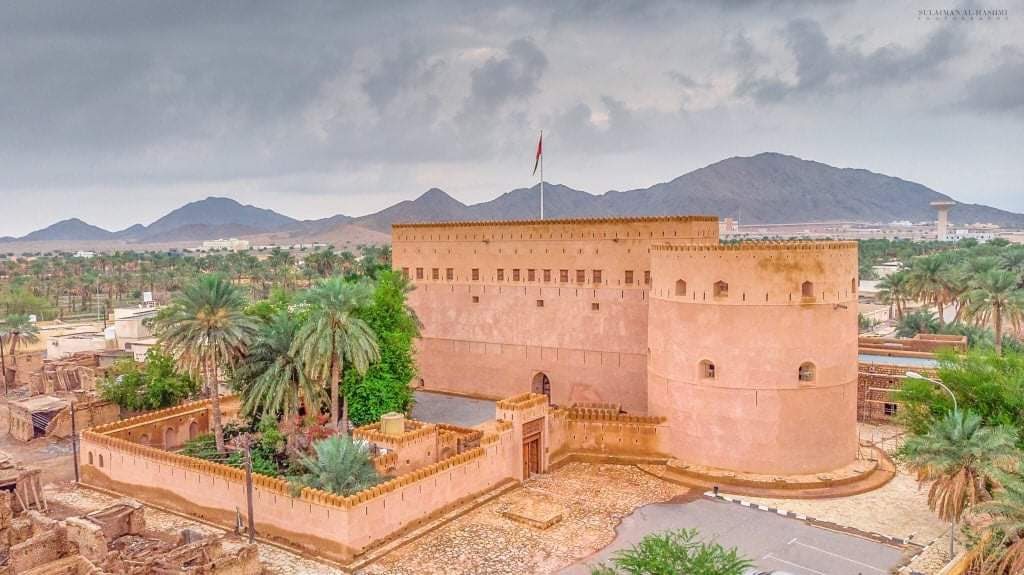
Al-Hazm Fort

Al-Hazm Castle is an outstanding example of Omani Islamic architecture and was built in 1711 AD. The fort's roof is built on columns, and contains no wooden supports. Its walls, at no less than 3 m (9.8 ft) thick at any point, can withstand great impact.

It is located in the Rustaq province of South Al Batinah Governorate and features a military stronghold that is among the traditional Omani defense landmarks. It includes prominent elements such as the massive wooden gate, secret escape tunnels, fortified towers, and upper-level gunports. There are also openings at the entrance used for pouring boiling oil or date honey on charging attackers.

It is also considered one of the most exquisite examples of Omani Islamic architectural treasures. It was built by Imam Sultan bin Saif bin Sultan Al Ya'arubi in the year 1711 CE. The fort stands out for its absence of wooden roofs, instead utilizing fixed round contracts resembling cylinders. The wall width is three meters, and the fort features several massive gates that do not meet in a single passage.

The fort houses various historical Portuguese and Spanish cannons with a firing range of up to 70 kilometers. It boasts specialized horse ascent staircases to the upper parts of the fort, along with secret passageways, each two meters wide and two meters high, dispersed in all four directions of the fort, leading out to the city. In the Hazm Fort, there are several rooms used for teaching the Quran, sciences, and religious knowledge. The fort is crossed by the Hazm Falaj, serving residents and visitors of the fort. The total area of the fort is 1600 square meters.

=== Tourist and archaeological sites ===
Among the tourist attractions in Rustaq are the "Ayun Al-Mas" (Diamond Eyes) hot springs, such as Al Khor, Al Hwayt, Al Khadra, Al Zurqa, and Ain Al-Kusfa, where the water temperature reaches 45 degrees Celsius. There are also the Shalat Al-Hawqeen hot springs. The area also features various falaj systems, including Falaj Al-Hamam, Falaj Al-Maysar, and Falaj Abu Tha'lab.

Rustaq is home to numerous archaeological sites, including forts, castles, and towers. Rustaq Castle dates back four centuries before Islam and comprises four towers and two floors. It ranks as the second-largest castle in Oman after Bahla Castle. Other notable structures include Al Hawqeen Fort and Al Hazm Fort, a masterpiece of Omani Islamic architecture. Rustaq boasts over 22 towers and several ancient alleys like Al Ghashb, Ayni, Jammah, Qusuri, and Al Mahadir.

The area is adorned with unique old mosques and prayer halls, such as Al 'Ulayyah Mosque and Al Bia'dah Mosque located within Rustaq Castle, along with Qasri Mosque.

=== Springs and wells ===
Rustaq is an area of healing warm springs, the most notable being 'Ain al-Kasafa. Its waters runs at 45 °C (113 °F) and are regarded as a cure for rheumatism and skin diseases due to its sulphur content.

There are three popular wadis to visit: Wadi Bani Ghafar, Wadi al-Sahtan and Wadi Bani Awf. In addition, the mountains are pitted with caves such as Al Sanaqha Cave with its own subterranean springs. One of the main occupations in Rustaq is beekeeping. Pure Omani honey is a most sought-after commodity and is of the highest quality. Fruits such as pomegranates, apricots, plums and grapes are grown on the foothills of the Akhdar Mountains and brought to Rustaq for sale. There are also historical mosques in Rustaq, including Al-Bayada Mosque, the Basra Mosque, and the Qasra Mosque.

Wadi Al-Hawqeen:

It is located about 40 km away from the center of Rustaq province and approximately 150 km away from Muscat governorate. This valley is characterized by its year-round flowing water, as well as its distinctive course featuring beautiful waterfalls and perennial flowing springs.

Falaj Al-Meisar:

One of the listed aflaj (traditional irrigation channels) in the World Heritage List, located in the village of Al-Khubayb in the Rustaq province of South Al-Batinah governorate. Its source of water comes from Wadi Al-Furayʿi, Wadi Al-Sinn, and Wadi Al-Halaa. Its origin is from Al-Ghadadiyah near the edges of Wadi Bani Awf. The main canal's depth reaches more than 50 meters, and the total length of its channels is about 5.5 kilometers. The underground channels extend to approximately 5.764 kilometers, while the surface channels extend to about 19 meters. The number of ventilation openings (Fardi) reaches 270.

The site of the falaj is surrounded by numerous historical and archaeological landmarks, including Rustaq Castle. This falaj was added to the World Heritage List in 2006, along with four other aflaj.

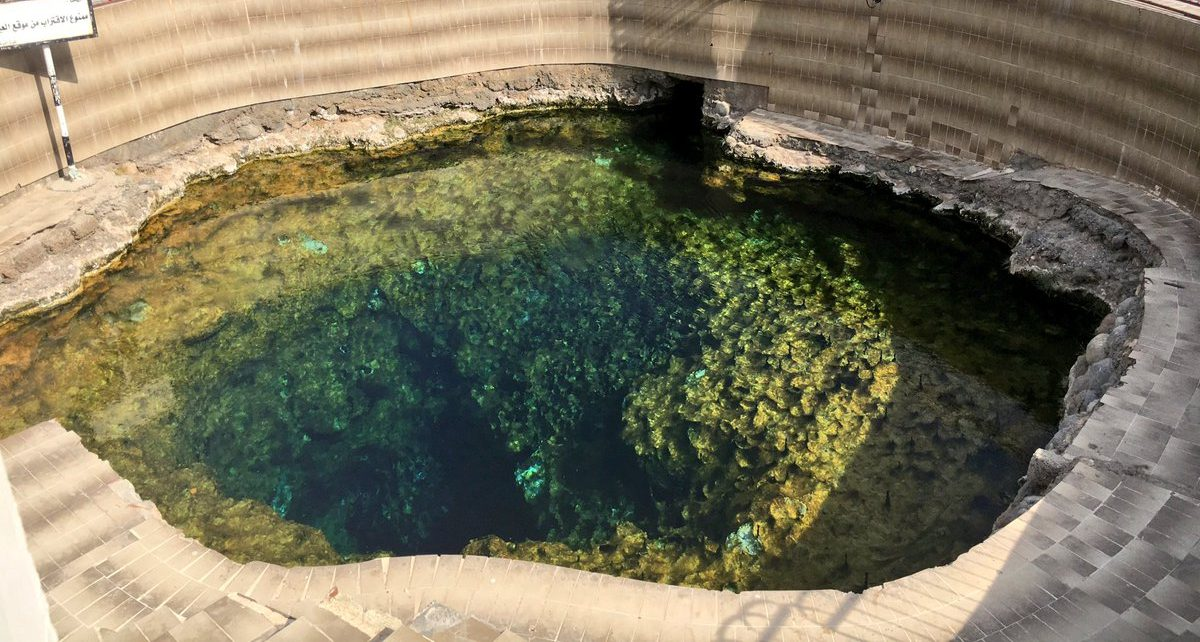
Ain Al Kasfah

Ain Al-Kasfah:

Located in the Rustaq province of Al-Batinah governorate, it consists of natural hot springs with a constant temperature of 45 degrees Celsius. Hot water flows from several "pools" to irrigate orchards. The waters of Ain Al-Kasfah are known for their natural treatment properties, particularly for rheumatism due to their sulfuric nature, as well as for skin conditions. It is situated about a kilometer away from the center of the province.

== Sport ==
The Rustaq Sports Complex is the principal sports venue of the city, with a football stadium, indoor stadium, and swimming pool.

== See also ==
- Eastern Arabia
