= Al Khaburah =

- Wilayat
- Country: Oman
- Governorate: Al Batinah North

Population (2020)
  - Total: 78,892

Al Khaburah is a Wilayat of Al Batinah North in the Sultanate of Oman.
