= Dhalkut =

Dhalkut ضلكوت
- Wilayat
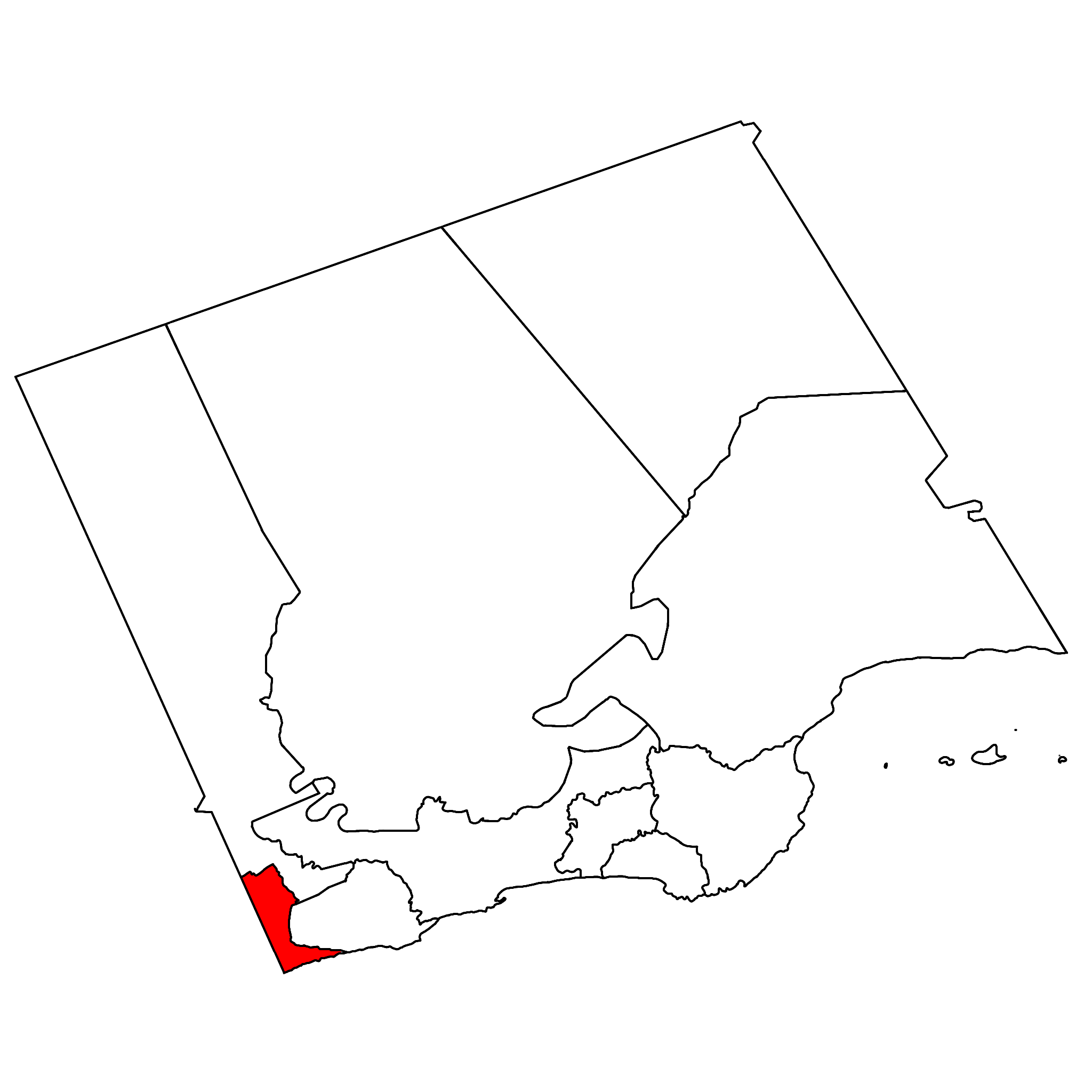
- Wilayat of Dhalkut in the Dhofar Governorate

- Location within Oman
- Coordinates: 16°42′21″N 53°11′03″E
- Country: Oman
- Governorate: Dhofar

Population (2020)
  - Total: 3,191

Dhalkut is a coast wilayat, or province, of the Dhofar Governorate, in southern Oman.
