= Wilaya =

Administrative division approximating a state or province

A wilaya or wilayah (Arabic: وِلَايَة, romanized: wilāya, plural وِلَايَات wilāyāt; Classical Persian: ولایت wilāyat; Urdu: ولایت vilāyat; Turkish: vilayet) is an administrative division, usually translated as "state", "province" or occasionally as "governorate". The word comes from the Arabic root "w-l-y", "to govern": a wāli—"governor"—governs a wilāya, "that which is governed". Under the Caliphate, the term referred to any constituent near-sovereign state.

== Use in specific countries ==
In Arabic, wilaya is used to refer to the states of the United States, and the United States of America as a whole is called الولايات المتحدة الأمريكية (al-Wilāyāt al-Muttaḥida l-Amrīkiyya), literally meaning "the American United States".

=== North Africa and West Asia ===
For Morocco, which is divided into provinces and wilāyas, the translation "province" would cause the distinction to cease. For Sudan, the term state and for Mauritania, the term region is used.

- Provinces of Algeria
- Provinces of Oman
- Regions of Mauritania
- States of Sudan
- Governorates of Tunisia

The governorates of Iraq (muhafazah) are sometimes translated as provinces, in contrast to official Iraqi documents and the general use for other Arab countries. This conflicts somehow with the general translation for muḥāfaẓa (governorate) and wilāya (province).

=== China ===
In the ethnically diverse Xinjiang region of Northwest China, the seven undifferentiated prefectures proper (Chinese: 地区; pinyin: dìqū; that is, not prefecture-level cities, autonomous prefectures, etc.) are translated into the Uyghur language as ۋىلايەت (wilayet). For the other, more numerous types of administrative divisions in Xinjiang, however, Uyghur uses Russian loanwords like oblasti or rayoni, in common with other Xinjiang languages like Kazakh.

=== Kenya and Tanzania ===
In Kenya and Tanzania, the term wilaya is a Swahili term which refers to the administrative districts into which provinces are divided.

- Districts of Kenya
- Districts of Tanzania

=== Southeast Asia ===
In Malay (both in Malaysian and Indonesian standards) and Tausug, wilayah or wilāya is a general word meaning "territory", "area" or "region".

In Thailand, it is the standard Malay term used to translate a "province"".

In Malaysia, the term

- Wilayah Persekutuan, often shortened to "Wilayah" in colloquial speech, refers to the three federal territories under direct control of the federal government: Kuala Lumpur, Labuan and Putrajaya.
- Wilayah Ekonomi Pantai Timur, is translated as East Coast Economic Region

In the Philippines, the term

- Wilāya sin Lupa' Sūg refers to the province of Sulu, Philippines.

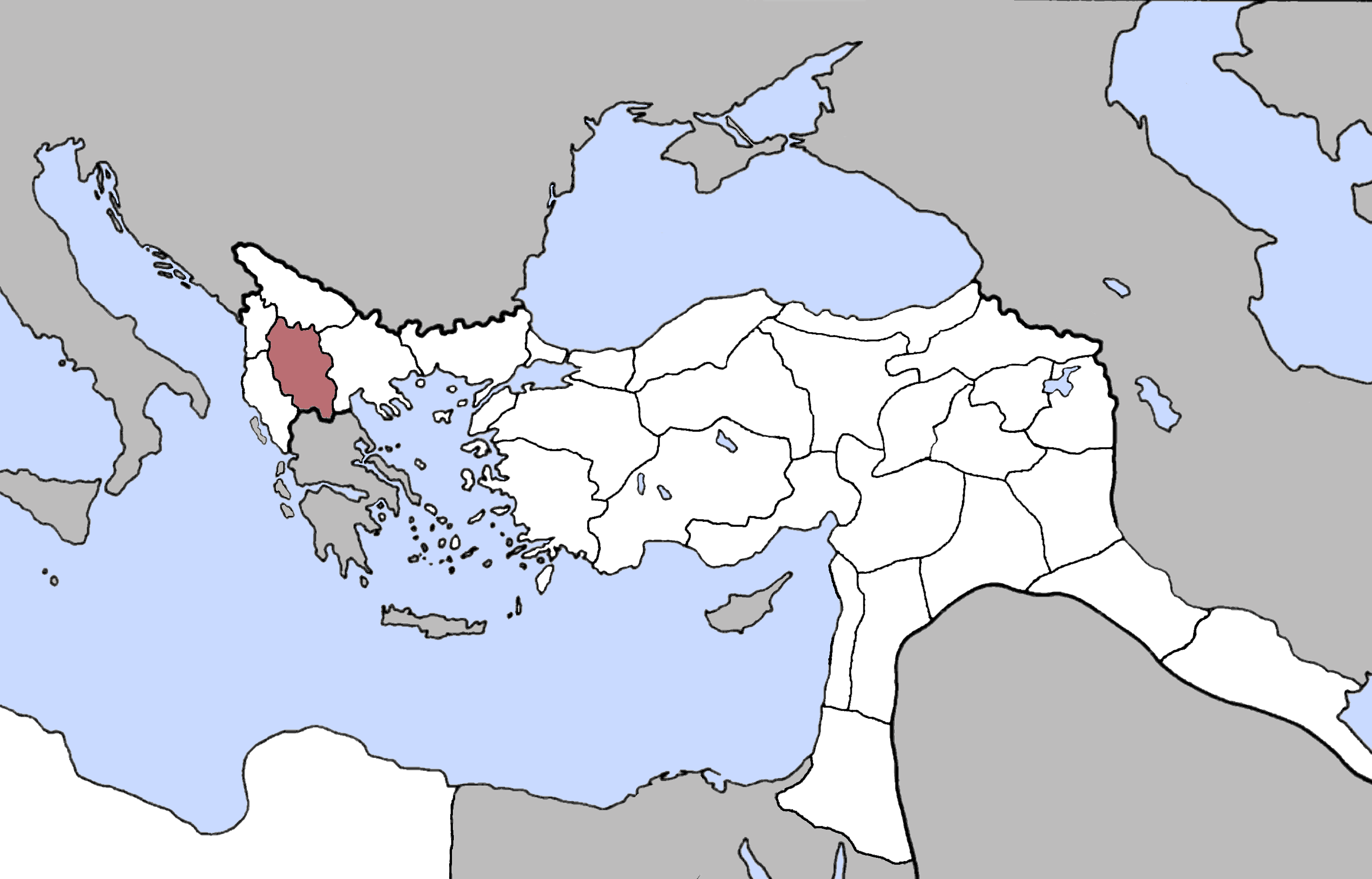
Monastir Vilayet, Ottoman Empire (1900)

=== Ottoman Empire ===
Traditionally the provinces of the Ottoman Empire were known as eyâlets, but beginning in 1864, they were gradually restructured as smaller vilâyets—the Turkish pronunciation of the Arabic word wilāya. Most were subdivided into sanjaks.

The current provinces of Turkey are called il in Turkish.

=== Islamic State ===
The territory under the governance of the Islamic State (ISIS) is referred to them as officially being divided into wilayah, often translated into English as "province". An example is Islamic State – Khorasan Province and Islamic State - West Africa Province.

=== Al-Shabaab ===
Territory controlled by Al-Shabaab are broken down into wilayas or local administrations.

=== Central Asia and Caucasus ===
The Classical Persian word for province (wilāyat) is still used in several similar forms in Central Asian countries:

- Provinces of Afghanistan (Pashto: ولايت, wilāyat, plural: ولايتونه, wilāyatuna), subdivided into districts (Pashto: ولسوالۍ, wuləswāləi or Persian: ولسوالی, wolaswālī)
- Regions of Tajikistan (singular: viloyat, plural: viloyatho), subdivided into districts (Tajik: ноҳия, nohiya or Russian: район, raion)
- Regions of Turkmenistan (singular: welaýat, plural: welaýatlar), subdivided into districts (Turkmen: etrap)
- Regions of Uzbekistan (singular: viloyat, plural: viloyatlar), subdivided into districts (Uzbek: tuman)

During the Soviet period the divisions of Tajikistan, Turkmenistan and Uzbekistan were called oblasts and raions, using Russian terminology.

In the Tsez language, the districts of Dagestan are also referred to as "вилайат" (wilayat), plural "вилайатйоби" (wilayatyobi). But the term "район" (rayon), plural "районйаби" (rayonyabi) is also used.

Caucasus Emirate, a self-proclaimed successor state to the unrecognized Chechen Republic of Ichkeria, is divided into vilayats.

=== South Asia ===
The Classical Persian word for province (wilāyat) is still used in several similar forms in South Asian countries as well:

(Pashto: ولايت, wilāyat, plural: ولايتونه, wilāyatuna), subdivided into districts (Pashto: ولسوالۍ, wuləswāləi or Persian: ولسوالی, wolaswālī)

== See also ==
- Vilayet
- Three valli of Sicily
