= Secondary roads in Oman =

Secondary Roads in Oman
- Marker for the S10

System information
- Length: 1,924 km (1,196 mi)
- Formed: December 18, 2019; 5 years ago

Highway names
- Secondary Roads: Sxx

System links
- Transport in Oman

Secondary roads in Oman are the third category of road in the Omani route numbering system and are designated with route numbers beginning with "S", from S10 to S46

The secondary road system was established on December 18, 2019 by the Ministry of Transport (now the Ministry of Transport, Communications and Information Technology), through the Road Numbering and Classification Guide. The guide outlined thirty-six distributor roads detailing their official classification, names, start and end point and distances.

== Definition ==
According to the 2017 Road Design Guide, secondary roads are required to meet the following standards:

- Connect cities together
- Link cities with arterial roads
- Serves urban areas with high traffic volumes.
- Reaches rural areas.

== List of secondary roads ==
Road number	Official road name	Start point	End point	Governorates	km	mi
S10	Aswad Road	Abu Baqara (N5 - R/A 297)	Aswad (Oman-UAE border crossing)	Al Batinah North	12	7.5
S11	Humaida - Mahdah Road	Humaida (N6 - R/A 64)	Mahdah (A3 - R/A 21)	Al Buraimi	27	16.8
S12	al Buraimi Road	al Buraimi Hospital R/A	al Buraimi (S13 - R/A 1)	Al Buraimi	3	1.9
S13	al Ghuraifa Road	Hamasa (Oman-UAE border crossing)	Sa'ra (Oman-UAE border crossing)	Al Buraimi	3	1.9
S14	Yanqul - Dhank Road	Yanqul (A5 - R/A 119)	Dhank (N2 - R/A 306)	Al Dhahirah	54	33.6
S15	al Dhuwaihir Road	N5 (Saham)	N1 (al Dhuwaihir)	Al Batinah North	35	21.7
S16	al Hijari - Hujairimat Road	al Hijari (N5 - R/A 182)	Hujairimat (A6 - R/A 129)	Al Batinah North, Al Dhahirah	98	60.9
S17	al Khaburah - Ibri Road	al Khaburah (N5 - R/A 168)	Muskin (A6 - R/A 112)	Al Dhahirah	80	49.7
S18	al Suwaiq - al Hauqain Road	N5 (al Suwaiq)	al Hauqain	Al Batinah North, Al Batinah South	32	19.9
S19	Falaj al Shura - Jamma Road	N5 (al Tarif)	A6 (R/A 33 al Wushail)	Al Batinah North, Al Batinah South	42	26.1
S20	al Rusail - al Mabelah Road	N5 - Junction 59	al Rusail (N1 - Exit 32)	Muscat	25	15.5
S21	al Khoudh Street	N5 - Exit 45	al Khoudh (N1 - Exit 39)	Muscat	11	6.8
S22	18th November street	al Ghubra (N5 - Exit 18)	al Mouj R/A	Muscat	16	9.9
S23	Muscat International Airport Road	N1 - Exit 18	Muscat International Airport	Muscat	7	4.3
S24	al Ansab Street	al Ghubra (S23 - Junction 3)	Murayrat (N2 - Exit 18)	Muscat	28	17.4
S25	al Ghubra - al Amirat Road	al Ghubra (S23 - Junction 1)	al Amirat (A2 - Exit 12)	Muscat	19	11.8
S26	al Qurum - al Bustan Road	al Qurum (N5 - Exit 11)	al Bustan R/A	Muscat	17	10.6
S27	Ruwi Street	Darsait Junction	Wadi Adai Junction	Muscat	5	3.1
S28	23rd July Street	Madinat al Sultan Qaboos (N1 - Exit 4)	S25 - Junction 3	Muscat	8	5
S29	al Jami al Akbar - al Jamiya Street	al Azaiba (S25)	al Khoudh (N1)	Muscat	26	16.2
S30	Izki - Nizwa - Bahla Road	Izki (N2 - Exit 100)	Bahla (N2 - Exit 171)	Ad Dakhiliyah	87	54.1
S31	Hay al Turath - Ghubrat Nizwa Road	Hay al Turath Interchange(N2- Exit 126)	Nizwa (S31 - R/A 47)	Ad Dakhiliyah	21	13
S32	Zukait - Manah Road	Zukait (A8)	Izz (N3 - R/A 15)	Ad Dakhiliyah	28	17.4
S33	Jibrin - Bisya - al Habbi - Adam Road	Jibrin (S31 - Junction 83)	Adam (N3 - Exit 50)	Ad Dakhiliyah	68	42.3
S34	Wadi al Uqq Road	N4 - Exit 18	N4 - Exit 39	Ad Dakhiliyah	25	15.5
S35	al Jarda - Mahlah Road	al Jarda (N4 - Exit 50)	N4 - Underpass 83	Ash Sharqiyah North	103	64
S36	al Naba - Ismayiyya Road	Ibra (N4 - Exit 104)	Mahlah (S34 R/A 58)	Ash Sharqiyah North	88	54.7
S37	Adam - Sinaw Road	Adam (S39 - Junction 5)	Sinaw (A8 - R/A 78)	Ad Dakhiliyah, Ash Sharqiyah North	56	34.8
S38	Adam Road	Adam (N3 - Exit 50)	Adam (N3 - Exit 54)	Ad Dakhiliyah	7	4.3
S39	Samad al Shan - al Mudhaibi - Sinaw Road	al Rauda (N4 - Exit 63)	Sinaw (A8 - R/A 71)	Ash Sharqiyah North	64	39.8
S40	Sur - Ras al Hadd - Asila Road	Sur (al Aija R/A)	Asila (S40 - R/A 11 )	Ash Sharqiyah South	97	60.3
S41	Asila - al Ashkhara Road	S41 - Junction 66	al Ashkhara	Ash Sharqiyah South	31	19.3
S42	al Kamil Wal Wafi - al Ashkhara - Mahut - al Zamayim Road	al Kamil Wal Wafi (N4 - Exit 201)	al Zamayim (N3 - Exit 230)	Ash Sharqiyah South, Al Wusta	408	253.5
S43	Um Mursais - Sur Masirah - Rasiya - Amq Road	Masirah City	Masirah City	Ash Sharqiyah South	132	82
S44	Qairun Hairiti - Taqah Road	Daghrub (N3 - Junction 832)	Taqah (A11 - R/A 611)	Dhofar	66	41
S45	Salalah - Titam - Qairun Hairiti Road	Salalah (S42 - Junction 16)	N3 - Junction 834	Dhofar	69	42.9
S46	al Saada - al Robat Street	Salalah (N3 - R/A 855)	Salalah (N8 - Port R/A 25)	Dhofar	26	16.2

== See also ==
- Transport in Oman
- National roads in Oman
- Arterial roads in Oman
- Distributor roads in Oman
