= Muscat Expressway =

Major 6-lane expressway in Muscat, Oman

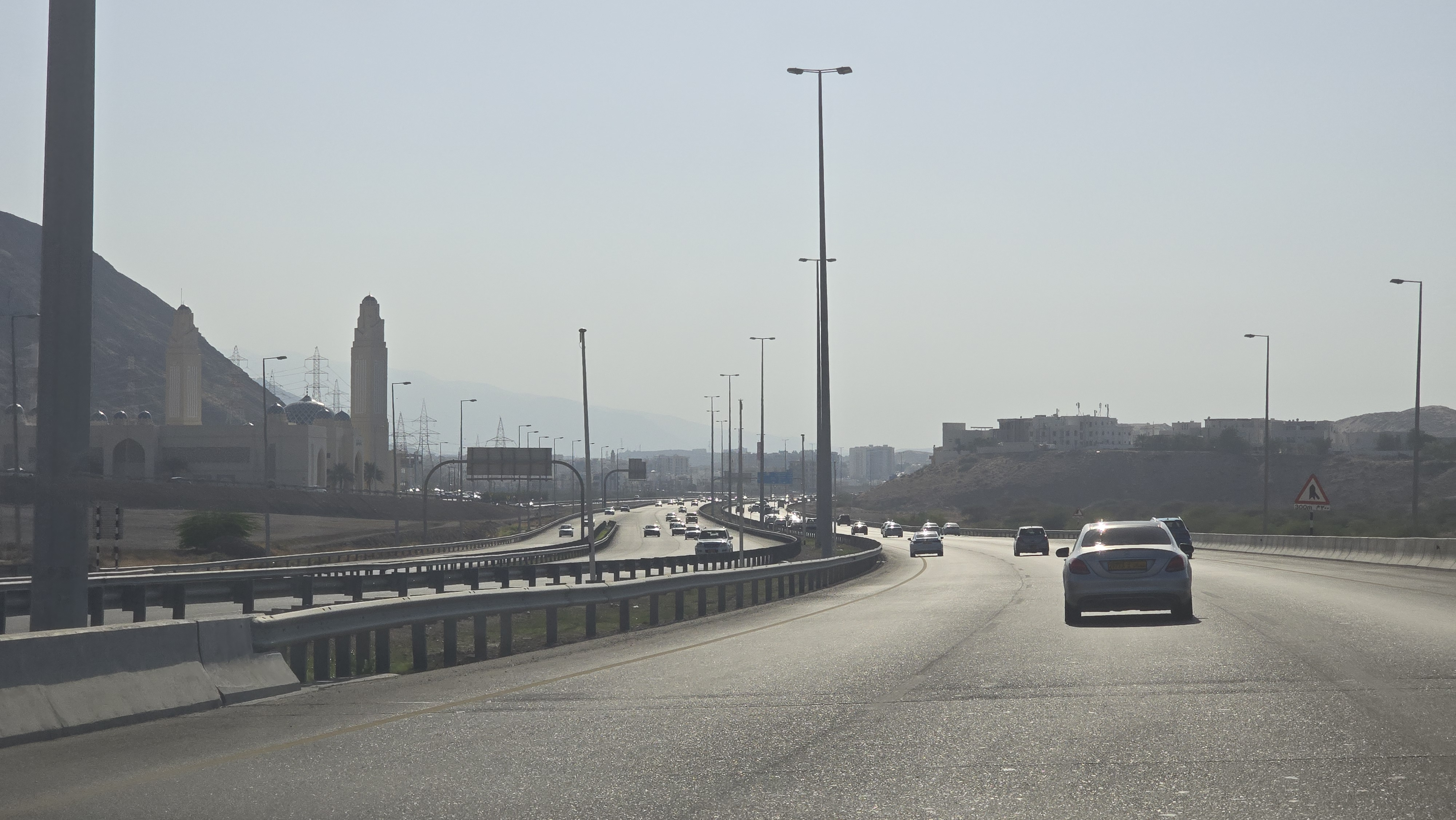

Route information
- Length: 56 km (35 mi)
- Existed: 2011–present

Location
- Country: Oman
- Major cities: Qurum, Madinat Sultan Qaboos, Bawshar, Ghubra, Rusayl, Khoudh Maʽabilah

Highway system
- Transport in Oman

Muscat Expressway (Arabic: طريق مسقط السريع) is a 56km 6-lane highway in Muscat, the capital of Oman. The expressway runs largely parallel to Route 1 but further away from the coast and acts as a relief road. it connects with the Batinah Expressway which is a 256km 8-lane highway that continues from the Muscat Expressway at Halban to the United Arab Emirates border at Khatmat Malaha. The expressway was opened to the public on 7th of January 2011.

== See also ==
- Sultan Qaboos Street
- Transport in Oman
