= Maʽabilah =

- District
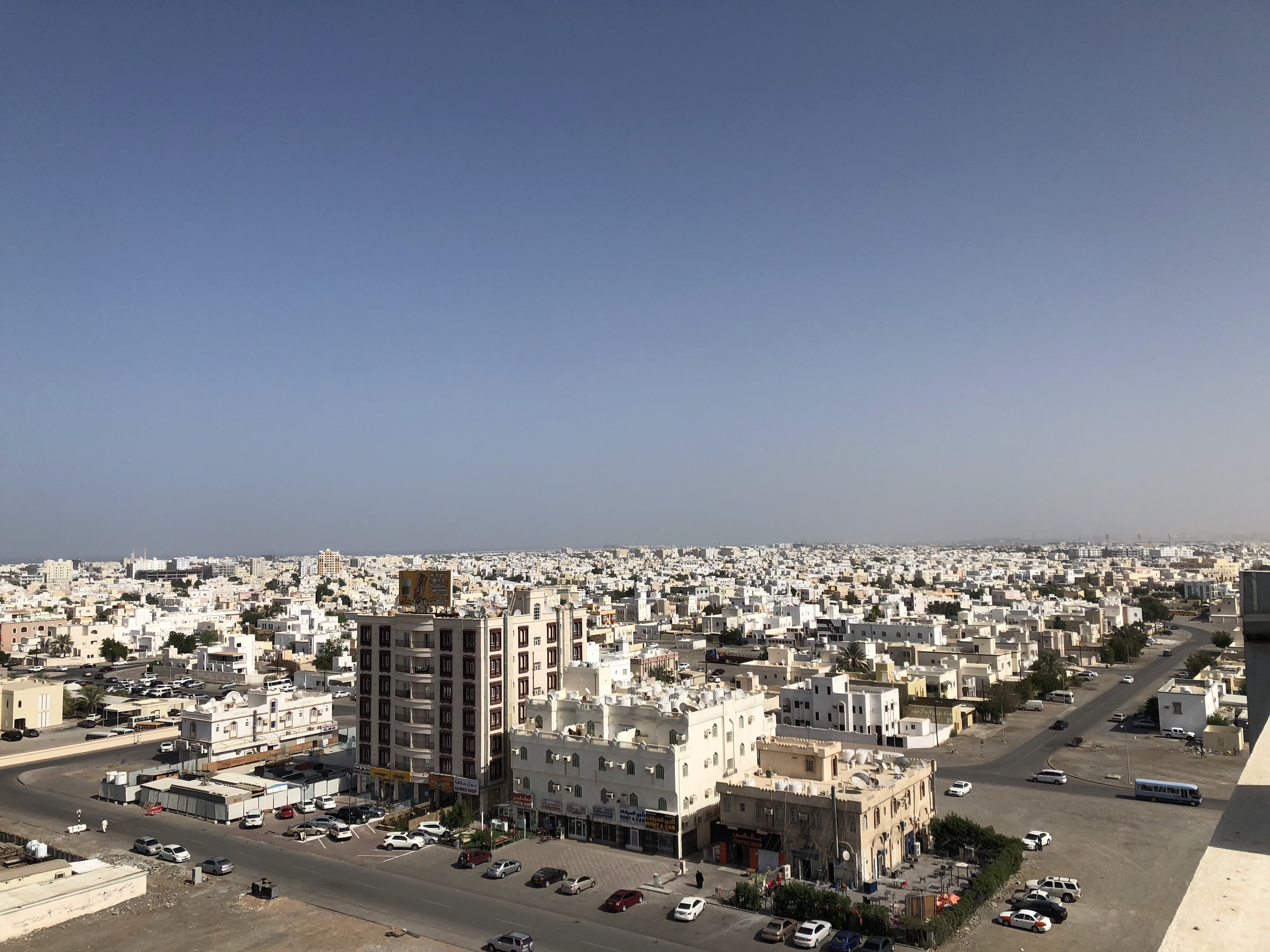
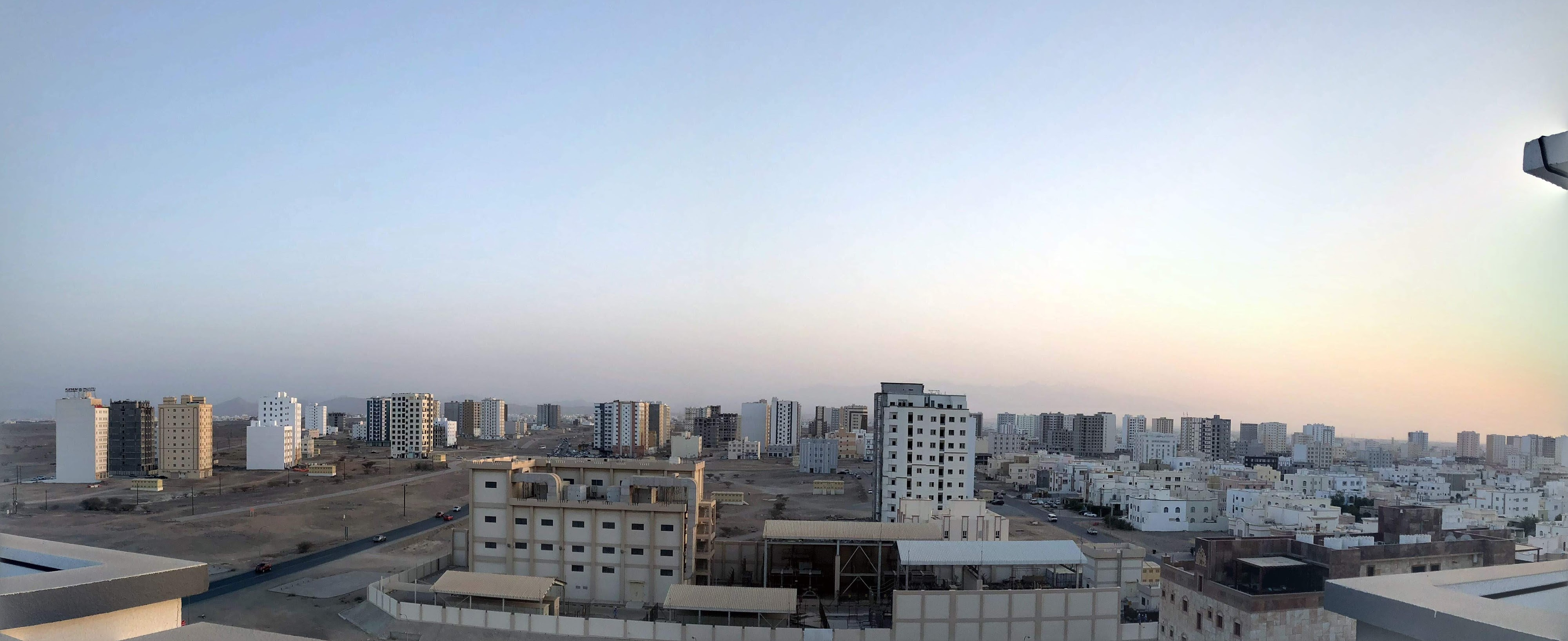
- Housing blocks in Maʿābilah Maʿābilah Industrial Area

- Location in Oman
- Coordinates: 23°41′N 58°09′E
- Country: Oman
- Governorate: Muscat Governorate
- Time zone: UTC+4 (Oman Standard Time)

Maʽabilah (also Al Maabilah) (Arabic: المعبيلة) is a coastal residential and industrial district in Al Seeb, within Muscat Governorate, in northeastern Oman.

Once a sparsely populated coastal stretch, it has developed rapidly in the past two decades into one of the largest suburban areas of Greater Muscat. The district is known for its mix of modern housing developments, light industry, and convenient road connections to Muscat International Airport and the city center.

== Overview ==
Maʿābilah forms the westernmost part of the Muscat metropolitan area. It is bordered by Al Hail to the east and Barka (in South Al-Batinah Governorate) to the west. Administratively, it falls under the jurisdiction of the Wilayat of Seeb, which is the most populous wilayat in Oman. The area is divided informally into residential and industrial zones, with Maʿābilah al-Janūbiyyah (South Maʿābilah) and Maʿābilah ash-Shamāliyah (North Maʿābilah) being the primary residential sectors.

== History ==
Before the rapid urban expansion of Muscat in the early 2000s, Maʿābilah was largely undeveloped desert and coastal land, occasionally used for small-scale agriculture and fishing. With the growth of the Muscat–Seeb corridor and improved transport infrastructure, the area became a major target for residential projects and government-supported industrial activity.

By the 2010s, Maʿābilah had transformed into a fully urbanized district, attracting both Omani nationals and expatriate residents. The creation of the Maʿābilah Industrial Area also spurred additional employment and commercial activity.

== Geography ==
Maʿābilah lies on the northern coast of Oman, approximately 16 km west of Seeb center and 30 km from central Muscat.

The area sits at an elevation of roughly 8–10 meters above sea level and features an arid coastal plain typical of northern Oman. The Arabian Sea lies directly to its north, while the Batinah Coastal Road and Muscat Expressway connect it to other parts of the capital region. The climate is hot and dry, with summer temperatures regularly exceeding 40 °C (104 °F) and mild winters averaging around 25 °C (77 °F).

== Economy and development ==
Maʿābilah hosts the Maʿābilah Industrial Area, one of Muscat region’s main light-industrial hubs, home to workshops, manufacturing firms, and small logistics companies.

In parallel, extensive housing projects (primarily low to mid-rise villas and apartment blocks) have expanded throughout South and North Maʿābilah. The district’s growth has been influenced by its relatively affordable property prices and its proximity to employment centers such as Seeb and Muscat International Airport.

Commercially, Maʿābilah has seen a rise in local retail markets, restaurants, and small malls serving its large population. Infrastructure development and accessibility have made it a quickly urbanizing part of the Muscat Governorate.

It is also important to note that, west of Maʿābilah lies the location of Sultan Hatiham City, a new planned community expected to cover an area of 14.8 million m2 and accommodate 100,000 people.

== Infrastructure ==
The district is connected by major highways including the Muscat Expressway and Route 1 (Batinah Highway). Public transportation options such as Mwasalat buses operate through the area, linking it to Muscat and Seeb.

Educational institutions include branches of public and private schools such as Indian School al Maabela and Indian School Seeb, while healthcare and commercial services have expanded in recent years. The Al-Maʿābilah Walkway is a landscaped pedestrian path, provides recreational space for residents.

Utilities and planning fall under the Muscat Municipality, which oversees road maintenance, waste management, and zoning regulations for residential and industrial expansion.
