= Jalan Bani Bu Hassan Province =

Coordinates: 22°04′54.7″N 59°16′44.4″E

Jalan Bani Bu Hassan جعلان بني بو حسن
- Wilayat
- Interactive map of Jalan Bani Bu Hassan
- Country: Oman
- Governorate: Ash Sharqiyah Region
- Province: Jalan Bani Bu Hassan

Population (2020)
  - Total: 44,593

Jalan Bani Bu Hassanِ (Arabic: جعلان بني بو حسن) is a wilayah in Ash Sharqiyah South Governorate, Oman. It is bordered by the Al Kamel and Al Wafi Wilayats to the north, Sur Wilayat to the northeast, Badiyah Wilayat and the Al Mudhaibi Wilayat to the west, the Mahoot Wilayat to the southwest, and the Jalan Bani Bu Ali Wilayat and the Arabian Sea to the east. It is approximately 300 kilometers away from the capital, Muscat.

The date palm tree is its emblem. The population of the wilayat is dispersed among around 87 settlements, including Jalan Bani Bu Hassan, Falaj Al Mashaykh, Al Ghayn, Al Quhaid, and Al Juwaira.

The natural landscape of Jalan Bani Bu Hassan Wilayat varies between plains, mountains, caves, and water springs. Notable mountains include Jebel Qahwan, which is known for its caves and cavities such as Mutaatib Cave, Halifah Cave, Wadi Al Marish Cave, Muteerah Cave, and Wadi Al Atin Cave. The wilayat also features several water springs and aflaj, including Ain Jebel Qahwan, Ain Al Khutum, Ain Al Buleida, Ain Dama, Ain Al Aqabah, Ain Minhal, and Ain Umm Al Baqar. There are approximately 32 aflaj in the wilayat, with 25 of them still operational.

The area is abundant in wild vegetation and is home to wildlife such as Arabian oryx and wild rabbits. It also boasts historical landmarks like the Oulad Marshid Castle, Al Flaij Castle, and Jalan Bani Bu Hassan Fort.

Local residents engage in various crafts and industries, including agriculture, animal husbandry, camel and livestock breeding, fishing, gold and silver craftsmanship, textile production, and leatherwork (such as "shumara"). The wilayat is known for traditional arts such as rizhah, al-azi, al-madimah, al-maydan, al-tashh-shah, and al-raywah. Additionally, horse and camel racing events are held in the region.

== Aflaj and Springs ==
There are approximately 15 springs in the region, some of the most important ones being Ain Jebel Qahwan, Al Khutum, Al Buleida, Dama, Al Aqabah, and Ain Umm Al Baqar. Among its significant aflaj (irrigation channels) are Al Manjard, Al Buwayrid, Al Muhiwal, Al Aqairiyah, Al Sharqi, Al Ays, Hilal, and Falaj Al Mashaykh.

== Historical Locations ==
The wilayat includes 40 old mosques. Many caves are found in Jebel Qahwan, which the inhabitants of the mountainous area used for their residence, storage, and the protection of themselves and their animals from strong winds, storms, and rain. Among the most important of these caves are Mutaatib, Al Halifah, Wadi Al Marish, Muteerah, and Wadi Al Atin caves.

Notable historical landmarks in the wilayat include Oulad Marshid Castle, Al Flaij Castle, and Jalan Bani Bu Hassan Fort.

Mutaatib Cave, Al Halifah Cave, Wadi Al Marish Cave, Muteerah Cave, and Wadi Al Atin Cave are significant natural features of the area.

== Forts and Castles ==
Jalan Bani Bu Hassan Wilayat is known for its 15 castles, with the most prominent ones being "Oulad Marshid Castle" in the Al Manjard area, "Al Flaij Castle," and "Al Muhaywil," which is considered one of the most important fortresses in the wilayat, serving as a center for local governance in the past.

The wilayat is also home to approximately 60 towers, including "Al Safirah," "Al Murasid," and "Barj Al Saqitah."

=== Jalan Bani Bu Hassan Fort ===
located in the Al Muhaywil area, is a historic defensive fortification built in the 9th century AD (3rd century AH) during the era of Imam Al Muhina bin Jafar. Over the years, numerous additions, renovations, and modifications were made, including during the 19th century AD (13th century AH) in the time of Sayyid Saeed bin Sultan Al Busaidi, and in 1991 AD during the reign of His Majesty Sultan Qaboos bin Said Al Said.

The fort has walls that reach a height of approximately 5 meters and is roughly square in shape. It is constructed from stone and adobe, with a roof made of palm logs and palm fronds. The fort covers an area of 5000 square meters and has two main gates, a primary gate on its western wall and a secondary gate on its eastern wall. In the northwest corner of the fort is a tower known as the "Guardian of the Homes."

The fort also includes a spacious courtyard, alongside old structures, it has new facilities, including administrative offices and their associated facilities. These new additions are situated near the western wall of the fort to the right of the main gate. In its courtyards, there used to be facilities that have since disappeared, such as the judge's house and the school building, which were adjacent to the southern wall of the fort.

The main building is located in the northwest corner of the fort, and it is semi-circular in shape. Some of its units are rectangular. The building consists of two floors, with the first floor having a long corridor that leads to the main building through a large wooden door. The second floor contains various multi-purpose residential units, with walls that rise up to 12 meters, and some units on top of them. These units vary in size and shape according to their use. These units surround a circular paved courtyard with a diameter of 50 meters. The courtyard is divided into two parts by a wall with the main entrance to the larger part located inside to the right of the main courtyard.

The larger part is dedicated to the official aspects, including the governor's terrace, the room of confidential meetings, the guard's room, the reception hall for guests, the date storage area (Nadad), the mosque, and the defensive tower. The smaller part is situated inside the building, and it is reserved for family aspects, including the main governor's residential wing, which consists of four rooms and a bathroom, located in the eastern part of the building. It also includes the secondary governor's residential wing, consisting of two rooms and a bathroom, located on the second floor only because the first floor serves as the entrance.

The smaller part also houses the food storage area, a swimming pool, a laundry room, and a defensive tower. The fort was strategically chosen to provide water and food for its residents. Large agricultural lands are located behind the fort, and extensive wells were dug to secure water. Two of these wells are located in the external courtyard of the fort, and one is situated in the open area of the main building of the fort. These wells were equipped with pulleys and bathrooms.

The fort's windows and openings were designed to provide lighting and ventilation, evident in the terraces where the governor meets the people twice a day. Most of the main entrances are characterized by vaulted doorways adorned with geometric patterns. The doors themselves are adorned with various botanical designs. In the walls of the main building, there are architectural decorations made of gypsum, including square patterns painted in different colors.

The architectural beauty of the fort is particularly notable in its entrances and doors, with most main entrances featuring vaulted arches decorated with various geometric patterns, and the doors themselves rarely lack floral designs. The main building's walls feature geometric decorations, consisting of squares created with painted gypsum.

== Traditional Crafts and Industries ==
The wilayat boasts a variety of traditional crafts, with a significant portion of its population engaged in agriculture, considering it their primary source of livelihood and sustenance. The region's fertile lands make it suitable for a wide range of agricultural crops. Water for irrigation is sourced from aflaj (traditional irrigation systems) and wells. The people in the desert areas specialize in herding sheep and camels, as there are vast grazing lands and plains with suitable vegetation for this traditional occupation.

In the coastal part of Jalan Bani Bu Hassan Wilayat, from the port of Al Saqalah to the port of Al Juwaira, most of the population specializes in fishing, which serves as a primary source of livelihood in that region. The people in the desert areas also engage in traditional crafts such as weaving and textiles. They utilize the wool from their sheep to create woolen products, meeting their needs for various woolen tools. The craft of "al-shamara" includes all leather goods, like sword sheaths and gun holsters.

Gold and silver craftsmanship is also practiced, which encompasses women's jewelry and daggers. Additionally, most of the wilayat's population is involved in crafting various palm leaf and clay pottery utensils, and there is a pottery factory producing various types of pottery. They source the clay material from the wadi areas located in the western part of the wilayat.

Over the years, some modern industries have been introduced in the wilayat as part of the comprehensive development efforts led by His Majesty Sultan Qaboos. The most significant modern industries in the region include dairy production, ice manufacturing, and brick production.

Moreover, the people of Jalan Bani Bu Hassan Wilayat are known for their traditional arts and crafts, including "Al-Razha," "Al-Aazi," "Al-Madeema," "Al-Maydan," "Al-Tashah Shah," and "Al-Raiwa." Horse and camel races are also held in the region

== Geography ==
Jalan Bani Bu Hassan is about 300 kilometres away from Muscat. It is bordered by Al Kamil Wal Wafi in the north, Jalan Bani Bu Ali in the south, Sur in the east, and Bidiya and Sharqiya Sands in the west. The province covers an area of 12,130 km^{2}.

Some villages of the province are known for their plains, mountains, caves, and wells, such as the caves of Qihwan Mountain (Qihwan is the local name for the Arabian tahr, which lives in the mountain).

== Jalan Bani Bu Hassan town ==
The town is surrounded by the Sharqiya Sands from the west and the high eastern Al Hajar Mountains from the East while the town itself lies on a plain full of desert vegetation and human-grown date palm trees in addition to other local crops.

== Population ==
According to the National Centre for Statistics & Information:

Year	Total Population
2011	33,697
2012	36,403
2013	38,474
2014	39,856
2015	41,422
2016	42,357
2017	42,168
2018	42,250
2019	43,324
2020	44,593

== See also ==
- List of cities in Oman
