= Burj Al Sahwa =

Burj al Sahwa
- برج الصحوة
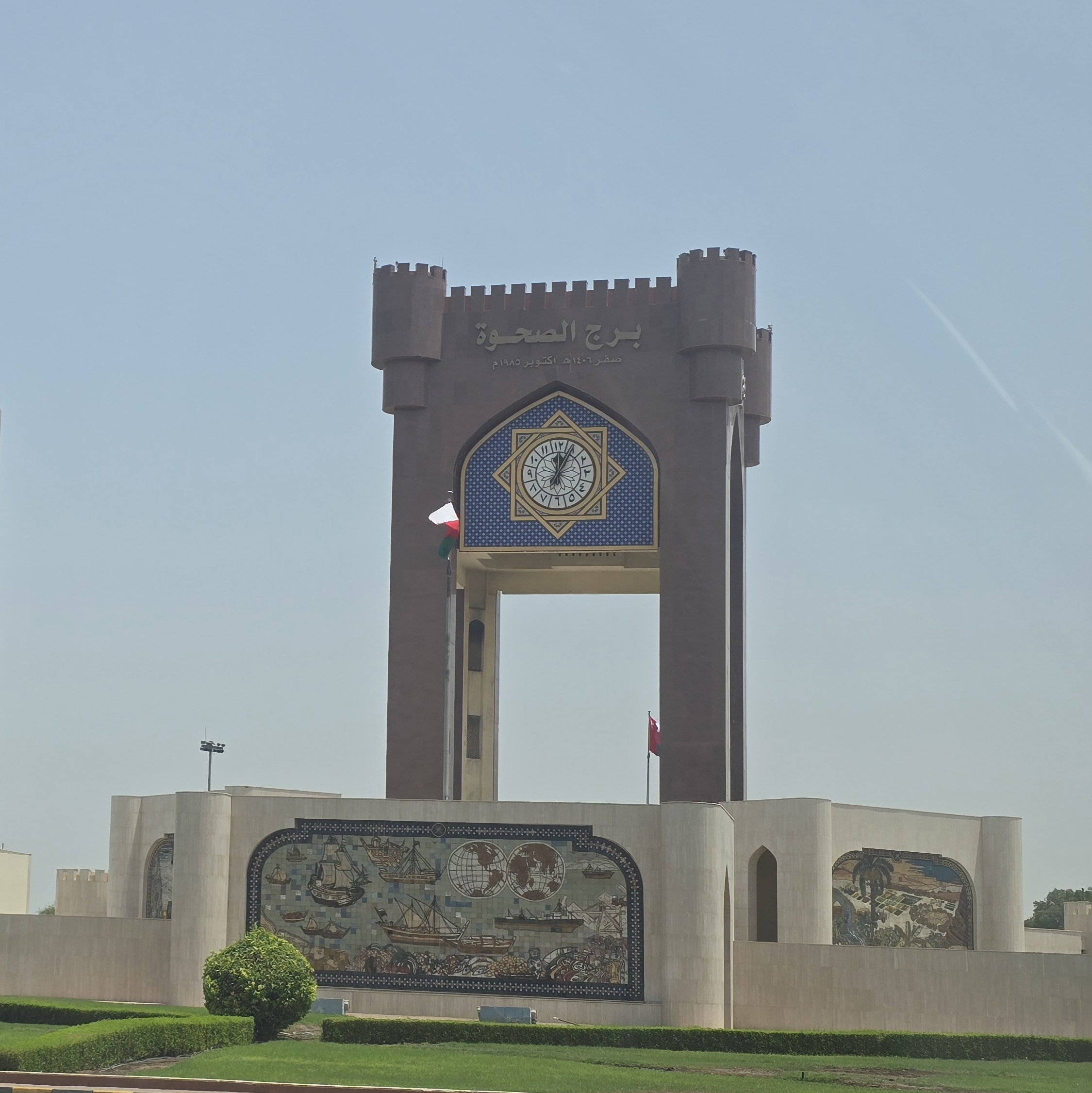
- Burj al Sahwa in August 2025

General information
- Type: Clock tower
- Location: Mawaleh, Muscat
- Coordinates: 23.5870°N 58.2521°E
- Completed: 27 October 1985; 39 years ago
- Height: 50 metres (160 ft)

Burj al Sahwa (Arabic: برج الصحوة) is a tower in the province of Seeb in Mawaleh in the Sultanate of Oman. It's located inside a roundabout linking many important provinces such as Muscat and Sohar via the N5 and Nizwa and Salalah via the N2. Burj al Sahwa also represents a waiting point for a lot of trips due to its location near a transfer hub that serves nationwide & international bus and taxi trips.

== History ==
Burj al Sahwa opened in October 1985. It has 4 faces each containing a digital clock and a large bell in the center of the tower ringing at every hour head.

The roundabout has seen particularly in the early morning hours heavy traffic which led to the use of traffic lights inside the roundabout during peak traffic times in 2020. However, their effectiveness has been debated heavily as many have said that the traffic lights have not relived traffic but added to the problem.

== Architectural design ==
The tower was built with a traditional Arabic Omani design. The tower specializes with its dark colors inlaid with a layer of marble on the side. The outside walls are engraved with drawings expressing the Ottoman environment, and the grounds are decorated with greenery and some rocks.

== Al Sahwa Gardens ==
On 8 December 2007 near Burj as Sahwa, Sayyid Khalid al Busaidi opened the Sahwa gardens. The garden covers an area of 300,000 square meters; it contains a group of parks in which each has been independently designed with its own special shape and plants.

== See also ==
- Muscat
- Oman
- Muscat International Airport
