= Ghezaal Enayat =

Afghan singer and songwriter

- Born: December 7, 1980 (age 45); Kabul, Afghanistan
- Occupations: Singer; songwriter; TV presenter
- Years active: 2008–present
- Height: 166 cm (5 ft 5 in)
- Musical career
- Origin: Laghman, Afghanistan
- Genres: Pop music; Afghan folkloric music
- Instrument: Vocals
- Label: Various

Ghezaal Enayat (Pashto: غزال عنایت) is an Afghan singer and songwriter. She rose to fame with her first duet song "Dil-e Beqarar". She sings both in Pashto and Dari languages. She was born in Kabul. Her father is from Laghman and her mother is from Kandahar.

== Career ==
In 2009, she began her career as a simple singer in Afghanistan and in 2011, when she migrated to Canada, she began her professional music career as a singer. At first, she never showed her face in music videos, afterwards having more courage, she showed herself in her music videos. She became famous with her first duet song in "Ashti" album with Afghan singer, Nazir Khara. "Dil-e-Biqarar" song was the first hit song of her. She continued singing with Nazir and several famous songs are "Wayrana Manzil", "Jigarom Jigarom", "Dak Dak", "Ma Ba Qurban Tu" and "Dobara Baran Meshowad".

Ghezaal is the first Afghan Singer to enter into Bollywood. The projects with Bollywood are currently pending.

In 2012, Ghezaal was chosen as the best new female singer at the Aryana Television Awards. In 2013, her "Ashiqi" song which is a trio song with two other leading male singers of Afghanistan, became the best song of the year at the Aryana television awards. In 2017, she represented Afghanistan in the global village festival in front of more than 21,000 people. Later that year, she got the title of the best singer of the year from BBC Persian. She has performed many concerts in Canada, United States, Australia, Tajikistan and in Europe.

== Awards ==
Year	Award	Category	Result
2012	Aryana Television Awards	Best New Female Singer	Won
2013	Aryana Television Awards	Best Song of the Year	Won
2017	BBC Persian	Best Artist of the Year	Won
2019	Diamond Music Awards	Best Artist of the Year	—
