= Kalban =

Kalban Al Kalban
- Location in Oman
- Coordinates: 20°18′0″N 58°38′0″E
- Country: Oman
- Governorate: Ash Sharqiyah South Governorate
- Province: Masirah Province

Al Kalban (or simply Kalban) is a community on Masirah Island in Masirah Province, Ash Sharqiyah South Governorate, Oman.
