= Sinaw =

- City
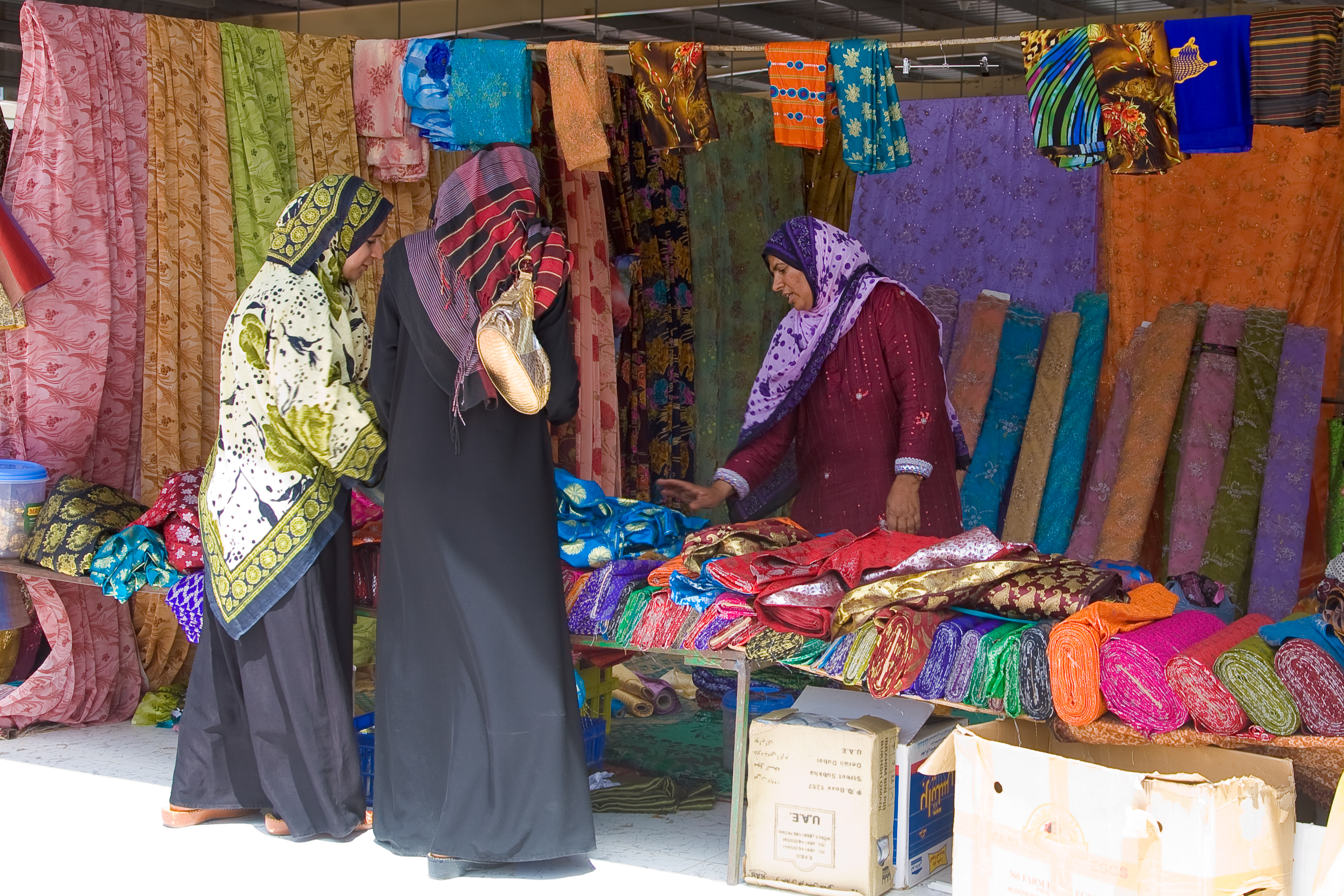
- Women at a market in Sinaw

- Location in Oman
- Coordinates: 22°30′56″N 58°1′59″E
- Country: Oman
- Governorate: Ash Sharqiyah
- Time zone: UTC+4 (+4)

Sinaw is a city in Oman known for its cattle market and its souk (marketplace). Sinaw is considered to be one of the most vital markets in the eastern region of Oman, in addition to Sur Market and Ibra Market. It is an urban city with some rural features, due to the surrounding desert.

== Markets ==
Among the markets in the city:

Artisan Market: It includes handicrafts and traditional industries such as weaving, silver jewelry, spinning, and some home-made craft products. It is held every Saturday.

Fish and vegetable market

Thursday Market: It is held every Thursday, and witnesses intense movement due to its proximity to the Bedouin communities who come to it to supply their needs and sell their livestock and handicrafts. This market starts from six in the morning until one in the evening.

== History ==
In the last century some of the city locals found some buried treasure, which included pre-Islamic specie and bore some resemblance to coins of the same era found in Russia. Other coins were minted during the Umayyad Era in the Arabian Peninsula.

=== Treasures ===
The Sinaw treasure was found inside a pottery vessel in Shawwal 1399 AH / September 1979 AD in the state of Sinaw in the North Sharqiyah Governorate. The glazed vessel is distinguished by its turquoise blue color and handles on both sides, and inside it are (962) pieces of silver dirhams, dating back to the Sasanian and early Islamic eras.

The preservation and preservation team at the National Museum has restored the Sinaw treasure, which is the largest coin hoard found in the Sultanate to date, as part of the museum's endeavor to highlight the contents of the Omani cultural heritage since the emergence of human impact to the present day.

It also includes many fields of ancient burials that extend long distances in the depths of the desert and date back to different time periods that extended between the end of the fourth millennium to the first millennium BC. The reasons for its settlement are due to the availability of water as a result of the passage of a number of valleys coming from the Hajar Mountains heading deep into the desert, in addition to its location at the crossroads of trade routes between the agricultural areas in the Hajar Mountains and the desert areas.

Archaeological surveys and excavations have been conducted in a number of these archaeological tombs, the most important of which are tombs dating back to the third millennium BC, specifically to the transitional period between the Hafit period and the Umm al-Nar period, and tombs dating back to the first millennium BC. The tombs included many archaeological finds such as pottery and steatite utensils.

Among the most prominent archaeological discoveries were found in a tomb dating back to the end of the Iron Age (300 BC), which included the remains of a man who died at the age of fifty, who was buried with his personal weapons and buried near his tomb of two camels. A male and a female were sacrificed after the death of their owner, and they were buried in two pits whose walls were lined with stones. The man was buried on his right side with a sword 88 cm long, in addition to two daggers, a robe, and a woolen hat. The sword was placed in front of the dead and its handle was directly facing the face. The handle was partially covered with ivory and made in the form of a beak. An eagle and two daggers were placed on the waist of the deceased on the right and left side. The sword and the two daggers were made of iron and lined with steel. It is believed that the source of this industry method is the Indian civilization, which probably made the first steel swords in the world and spread from them to neighboring civilizations, including Oman, and it seems that the dead person who was buried in the grave was from the elite of the people, and it is possible that he was the leader of the tribe, and this is indicated by the sword that was buried with the dead person, the robe he wore, and the camel. By examining the remains of organic materials, it is noted that the deceased was buried with his head placed on a pillow, wearing leather shoes, and near him a conical headdress made of wool was placed, in addition to a bronze vessel placed on his left side.

== See also ==
- Railway stations in Oman - planned
