= Port of Salalah =

Port of Salalah Location in Oman

- Interactive map of Port of Salalah Location in Oman

Location
- Country: Oman
- Location: Raysut, Salalah, Dhofar Governorate
- Coordinates: 16°56′53″N 54°0′32″E

Details
- Opened: November 1998
- Operated by: Salalah Port Services Company (S.A.O.G.)
- Owned by: Government of Oman, APM Terminals and other Omani Investors (Joint Venture)
- Type of Harbor: Seaport
- No. of berths: 6
- Employees: 2200

Statistics
- Annual cargo tonnage: 26.4 million tonnes (general cargo, 2025)
- Annual container volume: 4.3 million TEUs (2025)
- Website https://salalahport.com.om

The Port of Salalah is the largest port in Oman and has been in operation since 1998. Situated in the Dhofar Governorate, on the Arabian Sea which is on the northern part of the Indian Ocean, it is centrally located at the crossroads of trade between Asia and Europe. With over 2.5 billion consumers, it serves the markets of East Africa, the Red Sea, the Indian Subcontinent and the Arabian/Persian Gulf on its doorstep.

The port is part of the Maritime Silk Road that runs from the Chinese coast via the Suez Canal to the Mediterranean, there to the Upper Adriatic region of Trieste with its rail connections to Central and Eastern Europe.

== History ==
=== Development timeline ===
Period	Events/Details
Pre-1970	Goods arrive to and from the Governorate of Dhofar through rudimentary infrastructure. Large vessels were unloaded through offshore launches and feeders, which were unloaded to the port. The method is difficult, especially during the monsoon season (Khareef) from June through September.
1971–1974	Government of Oman initiates development of Raysut Port (Port of Salalah) located 20 km at the outskirt of Salalah. Port infrastructure is improved costing approximately US$11.5 million, and accommodates vessels up to 4 meter draft.
1976–present	93% of the port was financed
1981	Phase 3 of Raysut Port establishes a container terminal equipped with one 35 ton gantry crane at a cost of approx. US$ 9 million. The development supports the government's second 5-Year Plan to further the country's economic growth via international maritime transportation.
1996–	The Government of Oman and between Maersk Line, Sealand, and a few private institutions, agree to jointly invest in the development of Raysut Port into a world-class container terminal. Port of Salalah Container Terminal is inaugurated November 1998 and wins Best Investment Project in Oman Award
1999	Port of Salalah sets a world record for productivity with more than 250 berth moves per hour
2000	Bunkering facilities are completed. General Cargo Terminal comes under Port of Salalah management
2001	Community focus: Summer Internship program is launched
2002	Volumes in Container Terminal exceed design capacity for the first time

=== Other events ===
In 2009, a container ship Maersk Alabama Captained by Richard Phillips hat had departed from the Port of Salalah was hijacked by Somali pirates.The incident was made into a movie Captain Phillips a highly acclaimed movie which won several awards.

During the 2026 Iran war, the port's fuel tanks were heavily attacked by drones on 11 March, and a container crane was damaged on 29 March, temporarily suspending the port.

== Operator ==
The port has been managed by APM Terminals, the Danish terminal operating company, since 1998. The operating company, Salalah Port Services Company (S.A.O.G.), is listed on the Muscat Securities Market.

== Terminals ==
The port operates both a container terminal and a general cargo terminal, and serves the local and regional community.

The port was formerly known as Raysut Harbour or Mina' Raysut or Port Raysut. It can accommodate large vessels up to 16m draft. It is the main Container Transhipment Terminal of the region.

== See also ==
- Railway stations in Oman – proposed
