= Suhail Bahwan =

Omani businessman (1939–2025)

Suhail Salim Bahwan
- سهيل سالم بهوان
- Born: 22 May 1939
- Died: 23 November 2025 (aged 86)
- Occupation: Businessman
- Known for: Chairman, Suhail Bahwan Group Holding
- Title: Sheikh
- Children: 15
- Website: https://www.suhailbahwangroup.com/

Suhail Salim Bahwan (Arabic: سهيل سالم بهوان; 22 May 1939 – 23 November 2025) was an Omani billionaire businessman.

== Early life and career ==
Bahwan began as a small-scale trader in Sur, with one dhow, inherited from his father, doing business between Oman and India. In 1965, he moved to the capital Muscat, and opened a shop in the Muttrah Souq with his brother Saud, named Suhail & Saud Bahwan, initially they traded in construction equipment and fishing nets. In 1968, he obtained the local license for Seiko, and then one for Toyota.

In 2002, he split with his brother, and as a result, the Suhail Bahwan group was divided into two. In 2016, Bahwan passed much of the responsibility for running the Suhail Bahwan Group to Amal Bahwan, his second-eldest daughter. In 2021, he was the only Omani on Forbes' annual World's Billionaires ranking.

During April 2022, the French prosecutor's office in Nanterre issued an international arrest warrant for Bahwan, along with former Renault CEO, Carlos Ghosn following an investigation into whether they helped divert funds from carmaker Renault to its former chair and chief executive for personal use. In 2022, his fortune supposedly dropped by $600 million.

The Suhail Bahwan Group is now the largest privately owned business in Oman, with diverse business interests including fertilizers, healthcare, construction and automobiles.

== Personal life and death ==
Bahwan was married with 15 children, and lived in Muscat, Oman. He died on 23 November 2025, at the age of 86.

== Awards ==
- 2017: Sheikh Issa bin Ali al Khalifa Award for voluntary work by the Arab League.
