= Al Baraka Palace =

Royal palace in Oman

- قصر البركة
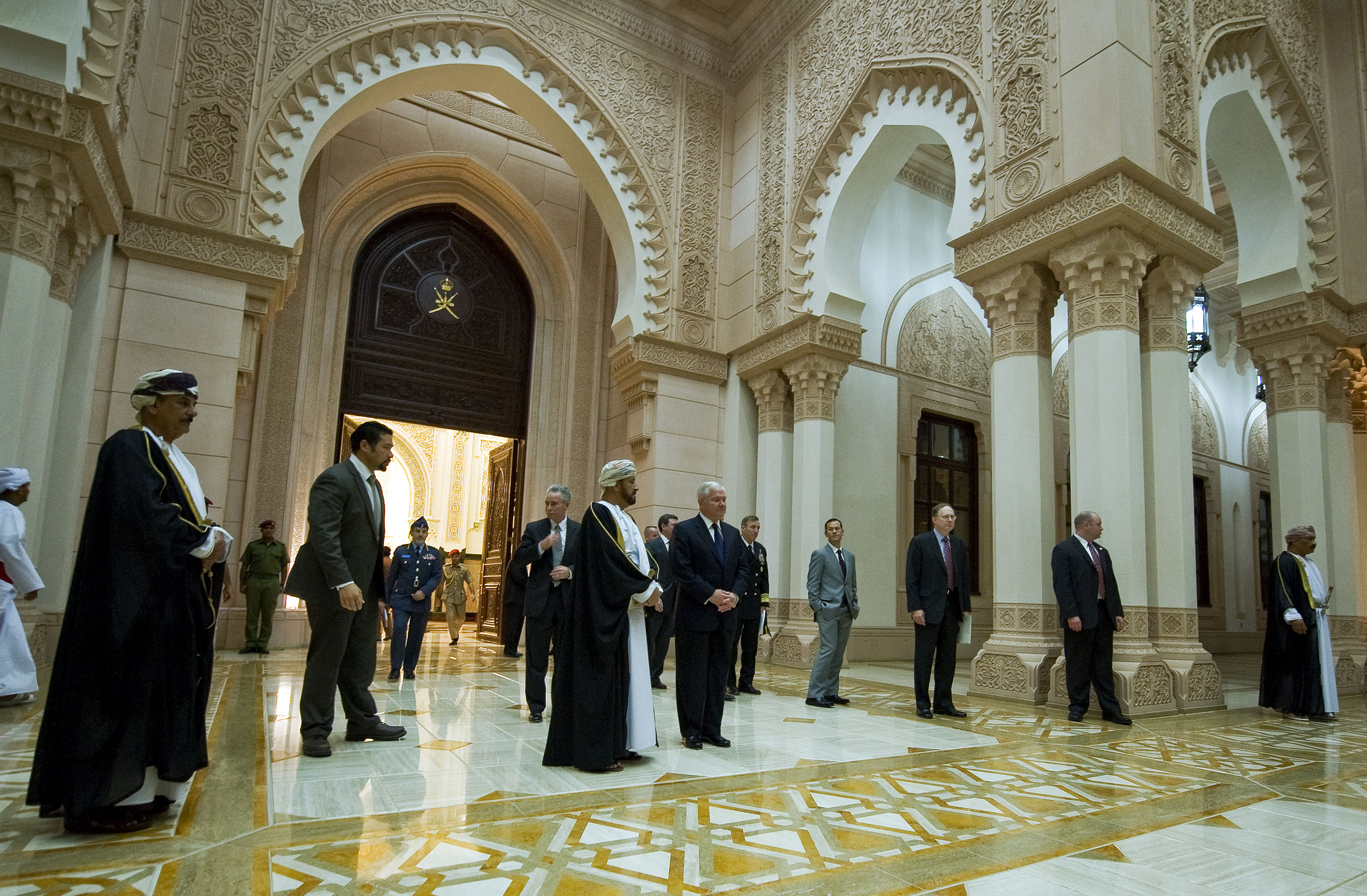
- Interactive map of Al Baraka Palace

General information
- Type: Palace
- Location: Seeb, Oman
- Coordinates: 23.70658°N 58.08867°E
- Owner: Sultan of Oman

Al Baraka Palace (Arabic: قصر البركة Qasir al-Baraka) is a royal palace in Seeb, on the outskirts of Muscat.

== History ==
The palace was designed by British architects, Page and Broughton, surrounded by gardens, and completed in the 1970s. Six villas, a majlis, and a sports hall were added to the palace complex in 1987. They were designed and built by the Cyprus based architecture firm, J+A Philippou.

== Oman Mammal Breeding Center ==
The Oman Mammal Breeding Center, which aims to study and help preserve genetic material of endangered species, is on the grounds of Al Baraka Palace and under the control of the Environment Conservation Office. It is home to Arabian leopard, Arabian oryx, Arabian Tahr, and Nubian ibex.
