= Batinah Expressway =

Road in Oman

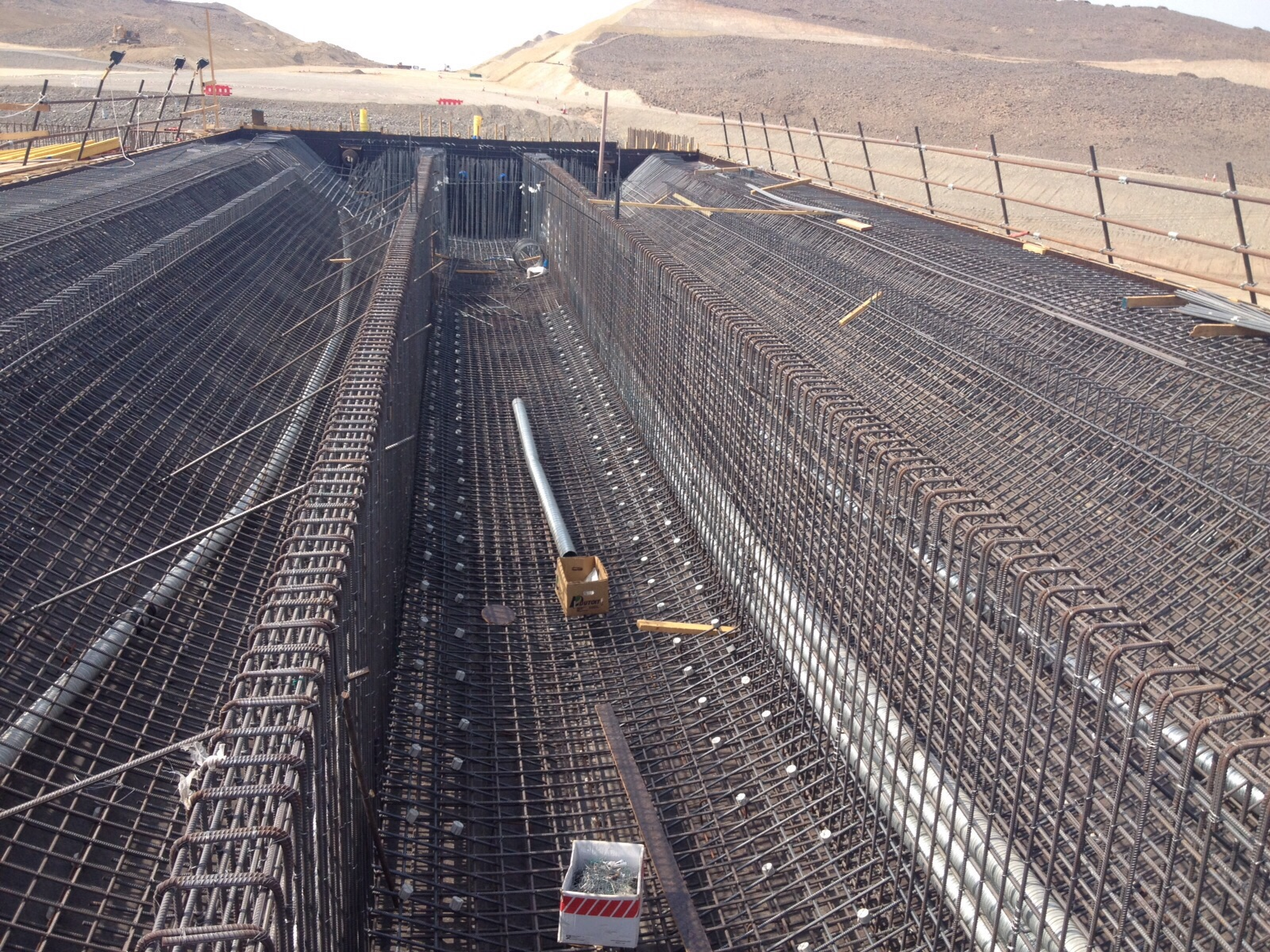
- Batinah Expressway under construction in 2016

Route information
- Length: 256 km (159 mi)
- Existed: 2018–present

Location
- Country: Oman

Highway system
- Transport in Oman

The Batinah Expressway is a 256 km 8-lane highway in Oman that connects the Muscat Expressway (a relief road in Muscat, the capital of Oman) at Halban with the United Arab Emirates border at Khatmat Malaha. It opened on 6 May 2018.

== History ==
Batinah Expressway was opened to the public on 6 May 2018. One of the biggest road infrastructure projects in the Sultanate of Oman, it consists of 1,106 concrete channels, 25 bridges crossing wadis, 17 overhead bridges, 12 tunnels and other technical paraphernalia to overcome terrestrial obstacles. The Expressway has four lanes in each direction and was completed in a time span of six years, built at a cost of RO 800 million.

== See also ==
- Muscat Expressway
- Transport in Oman
