= S10 road (Oman) =

Road in Al Batinah, Oman

Secondary Road S10
- Aswad Road
- S10 highlighted in red

Route information
- Length: 12 km (7.5 mi)

Major junctions
- East end: N5 - Khadrawin Roundabout
- N1 - Batinah Expressway
- West end: Oman-UAE Aswad border crossing

Location
- Country: Oman
- Major cities: Shinas
- Villages: Aswad

Highway system
- Transport in Oman

S10, also officially known as Aswad Road (Arabic: طريق أسود) and formerly designated as Route 3, is a secondary road in the Sultanate of Oman. It is a dual carriageway that crosses through two governorates and goes from the city of Bu Baqarah all the way to the border with the United Arab Emirates.

== Route description ==
S10 begins at the roundabout of Bu Baqarah which is on the N5 in the Batinah North Governorate. From there the route goes for seven kilometres (4.3 mi) until it crosses the city of Aswad. After crossing the town, the route goes all the way to the Omani border post in the Buraimi Governorate which borders the United Arab Emirates in the Emirate of Ras Al Khaimah.

== See also ==
- Transport in Oman
