= Khatmat Malaha =

Border crossing between the UAE and Oman

Coordinates: 24°58′41.6″N 56°21′53.5″E

Khatmat Malaha is a 24-hour border crossing between the United Arab Emirates and Oman.

In Oman, the Batinah Expressway, a 256km 8-lane highway, links the Muscat Expressway in Halban to the UAE border at Khatmat Malaha.

Wajajah is an alternative border crossing, which also operates round the clock.

== See also ==
- Transport in Oman
- Transport in the United Arab Emirates
