= Mawalih =

Al Mawaleh الموالح
- Residential Area
- Location in Oman
- Coordinates: 23°37′N 58°15′E
- Country: Oman
- Governorate: Muscat Governorate
- Province: Al Seeb
- Time zone: UTC+4 (Oman Standard Time)

Al Mawaleh (or Al Mawalih) is a residential area in Muscat, in northeastern Oman.The three main landmarks here are the Muscat City Center, Markaz Al Bahja And Mazoon Square.
