= Al Wajajah =

Al-Wajajah
- Town
- Location in Oman
- Coordinates: 24°47′47.76″N 56°13′34.32″E
- Country: Oman
- Governorate: Al Batinah Region
- Time zone: UTC+4 (+4)

Al-Wajājah (Arabic: ٱلْوَجَاجَة), or just Wajajah, is the busiest of four Omani ports bordering the United Arab Emirates, with Wadi Al-Jenzi, Buraimi, and Teibat being the other three. Wajajah is located in the Batinah administrative division of Oman. The town is 90 minutes by road from the city of Dubai, one hour from the Omani town of Sohar, and three hours from Muscat, the capital of Oman.

A tourist visa for Oman can be obtained at the Wajajah check-post for residents of the United Arab Emirates travelling by road. Tourists of nationalities qualifying for visa on arrival in Dubai can also use their Dubai visa to enter Oman by road, as a tourist, for a maximum of 2 weeks.

Wajajah lies on a bus route from Dubai to Muscat.

== Border crossing ==
There is a 24-hour border crossing between the UAE and Oman in Wajajah, with Khatmat Malaha being an alternative. The route between Dubai and Wajajah goes in and out of Omani territory since the border is not straight.

== See also ==
- Oman–United Arab Emirates border
- Transport in Oman
- Transport in the United Arab Emirates
