= List of railway stations in Oman =

Railway stations in Oman include

== Maps ==
- UN Map

== Under construction ==
(all 1,435 mm (4 ft 8 1/2 in) gauge)

- Al Ain - border with UAE
- Hafeet - junction
- Dhank
- Ibri
- Fahud
- Quam Alalam
- Bulk Terminal
- Haima - junction for Al Duqm
- Amal
- Marmul, Oman
- Thumrait - junction for Salalah
- Mazyunah - near border with Yemen

- Hafeet - junction
- Al Buraimi
- Sohar
- Khatmat
- Al Misfah
- Sinaw
- Ibra - mine

== See also ==
- Transport in Oman
