= Salim Rashid Suri =

- Born: c. 1910–1912; Sur, Oman
- Died: 1979 Sur, Oman
- Occupations: Singer, instrumentalist

Salim Rashid Suri (Arabic: سالم راشد الصوري; between 1910 and 1912, Sur, Oman – 1979, Sur, Oman) was a 20th-century ṣawt singer and oud player from Oman. He is particularly associated with the ṣawt genre called Ṣawt al-Khaleej ("Voice of the Gulf").

== Career and personal life ==
As a teenager, Suri worked on sailing ships plying the Persian Gulf and Indian Ocean. He first started as a maidan singer; he learned ṣawt by listening to phonograph records of performances by Abdullatif al-Kuwaiti. Continuing to travel widely, he became known as "The Singing Sailor".

Suri's family was conservative and did not approve of his musical inclinations; his brother even threatened to shoot him if he did not give up singing. He consequently moved to Mumbai where he worked first as a boilerman, then as a mercantile broker and translator in the trade between Arab and Indian merchants. During this time, Suri continued to practice and perfect his musical art, integrating Indian influences into his music – some of his lyrics were in Urdu as well as his native Arabic, helping him secure a steady sale of his records (he recorded twelve 78-rpm shellac gramophone records in the early 1930s) to an Indian as well as an Arabic audience.

In 1943, Salim Rashid Suri married an Indian woman and, in the late 1940s, he and his wife relocated to Bahrain where he enjoyed success as a performer and set up his own record label and recorded other musicians. He continued to be a leading creator and exponent of the Ṣawt al-Khaleej ("Voice of the Gulf") variety of ṣawt. However, the advent of vinyl records ruined his record business and he returned to Oman in 1971 where the Sultan made him a consultant for cultural affairs. He died in 1979, considered by then a beloved cultural treasure of Oman.

== See also ==
- Lists of musicians
- List of Omani singers
