= BBC Persian =

Persian-language news broadcast station

- Country: United Kingdom
- Headquarters: BBC Broadcasting House, London
- Broadcast area: Worldwide (website and online streaming); Iran (radio and TV)
- Owner: BBC World Service
- Parent: BBC
- Launch date: 29 December 1940; 85 years ago
- Television: BBC Persian Television
- Official website: www.bbc.co.uk/persian

BBC Persian (Persian: بی‌بی‌سی فارسی) is the Persian language broadcast station and subsidiary of BBC World Service. It broadcasts political, social, economical and sport news relevant to Iran, Afghanistan, and the world. Its headquarters are in London, United Kingdom.

Persian has one of the fewest native and total speakers in the BBC World Service, with approximately 127 million speakers (L1 and L2), with 35 million, 11 million, 9 million and 5 million native speakers in Iran, Afghanistan, Tajikistan and Uzbekistan, respectively.

Iranian authorities classified various Persian-language media outlets operating outside the country including BBC Persian as part of their “military target bank” during the 2026 Iran war.

== Radio ==
The BBC first started a Persian radio service during World War II on 29 December 1940, encouraged by the Foreign Office, as part of its Empire Service. The government reasons for prioritising this was concern that the Iranian king, Reza Shah Pahlavi, was sympathetic to Nazi Germany. Following the Anglo-Soviet invasion of Iran in August 1941, the Foreign Office encouraged broadcasting about king's autocratic style and republican systems of Government.

The Persian Service continued after the war as part of the BBC General Overseas Service, with more editorial independence from the UK government. However the risk of the Iranian nationalisation of Anglo-Persian Oil Company created an exceptional circumstance causing the Foreign Office to issue memorandums of advice and lists of points to make to the BBC, and the amount of broadcasting more than doubled. This caused many Iranians to believe the Persian Service was not independent, and an advisor of Prime Minister Mohammad Mosaddegh said the "BBC was the voice of British imperialism and we did not trust it".

In September 2022, the World Service announced the proposed closure of its Persian and Arabic radio service as part of a cost-cutting plan, but an online service will remain.

A radio service in Dari remains as of 18 January 2025. As of 5 January 2025, the Al Ashkharah and Woofferton transmitting stations were known to broadcast Dari programming on varying shortwave frequencies, with the hours ranging from 6 hours to 6 and a half hours a day.

=== Role in 1953 Iranian coup d'état ===
The British government used the BBC's Persian service for advancing its propaganda against democratically elected Prime minister of Iran Mohammad Mosaddegh and anti-Mosaddegh material were repeatedly aired on the radio channel to the extent that Iranian staff at the BBC Persian radio went on strike to protest the move. The BBC was at times even used directly in the operations, sending coded messages to the coup plotters by changing the wording of its broadcasts.

=== Under Mohammad Reza Shah Pahlavi ===
From 1965, the newly formed BBC World Service took over the running of the BBC Persian Service.

In the years before the revolution, the BBC Persian Service became highly trusted and liked by listeners, and gained mass appeal beyond intellectuals and the Iranian diaspora.

Mohammad Reza Pahlavi and his supporters became critical of the BBC in creating the environment for the popular upheaval that eventually led to the Iranian Revolution in February 1979. The Shah frequently sent telegrams to the BBC about Persian Service reporting. The Iranian Ambassador in London, Parviz Radji, tried to tone down these complaints recognising the BBC was acting independently, but had many meetings with the top management of the BBC in the late 1970s, including the Director-General Ian Trethowan. In the year before the revolution, the Persian Service interviewed the major contenders: one with Ayatollah Khomeini, three or four with Prime Minister Shapur Bakhtiar and two with Karim Sanjabi, leader of the National Front who were seeking a peaceful democratic transition from the Shah's rule.

During the revolution, Iranian media was heavily censored, resulting in long strikes by journalists, and the BBC Persian Service gained an even larger country-wide audience.

=== After the 1979 revolution ===
In 1980, the BBC correspondent in Iran was expelled and the BBC office in Tehran closed. For 19 years, the BBC covered Iran from London with occasional short visits to Iran by correspondents. However, after the 1999 election of President Mohammad Khatami the BBC was able to re-open a Tehran office with a resident correspondent.

As of 2000, BBC Persian Service output was about 28 hours per week, with a mixture of news, education and entertainment programmes.

== Internet ==
BBC Persian has had a web presence since May 2001.

== Television ==
In 2008, the BBC announced the launch of the BBC Persian Television. It was launched in January 2009 and is based in BBC Broadcasting House, London. It complements the BBC's existing Persian-language radio and online services.

It was initially broadcast for eight hours a day, seven days a week, from 17.00 to 01.00 hours – peak viewing time in Iran. It is freely available to anyone with a satellite dish in the region.

BBC proposals for the service were drawn up by senior BBC management. These were approved by the then BBC Governors – the body that oversaw the BBC and ensures the BBC's independence from the UK Government. They were then submitted to the Foreign and Commonwealth Office (FCO) for their consent as the BBC is obliged to do under the agreement with the FCO.

The operating cost of £15m a year is funded by the UK Government. Funding for the new service was announced by then UK chancellor of the exchequer Gordon Brown in a speech in October 2006. The funding was confirmed by the next chancellor of the exchequer Alistair Darling in October 2007. Some 140 staff are employed, of which about 40 are support personnel.

== Criticism ==
Peter Tatchell accused BBC Persian of "promoting the homophobic views of the Iranian regime". Writing for NourNews, Mohammad Ghaderi described BBC Persian as "one of the leaders of the media war against the Iranian nation".

== Staff harassment ==
In 2018, the BBC made an appeal to the United Nations Human Rights Council in Geneva to help stop Iran from harassing its Persian Service staff in the United Kingdom and their families in Iran. The BBC states Iran began targeting BBC Persian staff after the 2009 Iranian presidential election protests, when the Iranian government accused foreign media and intelligence services of interference. Iran has accused 152 current and former staff and contributors of "conspiracy against national security" and started criminal investigations, as well as instigating an asset freeze on many of those staff.

Iran rejects the harassment allegations. Iran's permanent mission to the UN in Geneva stated "BBC Persian is not an independent media network ... Its financial and political affiliation with the ministry of foreign affairs and the British security agencies has been very serious."
