= German University of Technology in Oman =

Private university in Oman

Coordinates: 23.63625°N 58.046°E

- Type: Private university
- Established: 2007
- Affiliations: RWTH Aachen University, Germany
- Rector: Michael Braun
- Administrative staff: 180
- Students: Approx. 2500
- Location: Halban, Oman
- Website: www.gutech.edu.om

The German University of Technology in Oman (GUtech) is a private university in Halban, Oman. It was established in 2007 in Muscat in collaboration with RWTH Aachen University in Germany. In the Academic Year 2021/22 more than 2400 students were enrolled in GUtech's programs.

== History ==
The history of the German University of Technology (GUtech) can be traced back to 2003.

RWTH Aachen University in Germany was approached with the intention of bringing German education to Oman. After a few years of discussion and negotiation, the founders were ready to begin a plan of action for establishing a university. In August 2006, Oman Educational Services L.L.C. (OES), a limited liability company under the laws of the Sultanate of Oman, was incorporated to establish a university on a formal footing. OES is the legal entity responsible for initiating education-related projects.

A Collaborative Agreement between RWTH Aachen University and OES was signed in December 2006, paving the way for the establishment of a private university in the Sultanate of Oman. This cemented the groundwork for everything the founder envisioned: a high-quality university of technology in of Oman. Specifically, the agreement laid the framework for collaboration between OES and RWTH Aachen University in terms of academic curricula, quality assurance and expertise, and setting up a technological university. All GUtech programmes have been developed in cooperation of GUtech with RWTH Aachen University in Germany.

University rankings

Global – Overall
- QS World: 1001-1200 (2026)

In March 2007, The Ministry of Higher Education of the Sultanate of Oman issued a Ministerial Decision No. 9/2007 for the establishment of the Oman German University of Technology (OGTech). This was followed by the development of four Bachelor of Science programmes of study, namely: Sustainable Tourism and Regional Development, Urban Planning and Architectural Design, Applied Geosciences, Applied Information Technology.

In September 2007, the university opened its doors to students in rented premises in Athaibah. Initially, sixty (60) Omani male and female students joined the Foundation Year Programme (FYP). A preparatory study programme that acts as a bridge between high school and university education. In 2008, the name of the university was changed to the German University of Technology in Oman (GUtech). Shortly thereafter, in July 2009, GUtech received international accreditation by ACQUIN, a German-based accreditation agency, for its Bachelor of Science programs. With a continuously growing reputation, the university added new Bachelor of Engineering programmes, namely: Process Engineering and Mechanical Engineering.

The university opened a second campus beside Muscat International Airport in October 2010. In 2011, the Bachelor of Engineering in Environmental Engineering was introduced, along with the first Master programme, in Petroleum Geoscience.

An architecture office was commissioned to design a building for the university that would reflect Oman heritage and German precision. In 2011, construction work began to establish a campus in the Halban area.

In September 2012, GUtech moved into its permanent campus in Halban. The campus, which has a total area of 500,000 m^{2} (5,400,000 sq ft), was the first-ever Green campus in Oman. The building earned the 2013 award of the best commercial building of the year in Oman and in the Middle East.

== Affiliation with RWTH Aachen University ==
GUtech is affiliated to RWTH Aachen University in Germany.

== Academic programs ==
The university offers full-time Bachelor of Science (BSc), Bachelor of Engineering (BEng) as well as part-time Master of Science programs. Additionally, the university offers a GUtech Foundation Programme.

The Foundation Programme has been designed to equip students with the skills required to succeed in the Bachelor programmes. Whereas the Core Studies Program mainly provides students with the necessary English language skills, the Academic Studies Program is made up of different modules including economics, mathematics, information technology, sciences and creative design.

=== Bachelor of science programs ===
- BSc in Applied Geosciences
- BSc in Computer Science
- BSc in International Business and Service Management
- BSc in Urban Planning and Architectural Design
- BSc in Logistics
- BSc in Cyber Security
- BSc in Artificial Intelligence

=== Bachelor of engineering programs ===
- BEng in Mechanical Engineering
- BEng in Process Engineering
- BEng in Environmental Engineering

=== Master Programs ===
- MSc in Applied Geoscience (part-time)
- MSc in Computer Science
- Master of Engineering in Industrial Production and Manufacturing
- MSc in Architecture and Urban Planning
- MSc in Business Administration
- MSc in Hydrogen Economy and Technology

=== Doctoral Programs ===
- PhD in Applied Geosciences
- PhD in Computer Science
- Doctor of Business Administration

The language of tuition at GUtech is English, German is taught as an additional foreign language.

== Students ==
In the summer semester 2019 approx. 2200 students were enrolled in different programs at GUtech, about 8% of them were international students. Each year students receive financial aid and scholarships from different sources either from industry or government like Occidental Petroleum Corporation (Oxy), German Academic Exchange Service (DAAD), the Ministry of Higher Education, Oman International Fertilizer Company (OMIFCO), OMRAN and Oman Educational Services (OES).

The entry requirements depend on the program and the level of entrance. For example, to enter directly into one of the Bachelor programs, students need to submit IELTS results of at least 6.0, or equivalent TOEFL results. The applicant may also need to pass a GUtech entrance examination.

== International accreditation ==
GUtech was the first private university in the Sultanate that received international accreditation for all Bachelor of Science and Bachelor of Engineering programs by the international Accreditation, Certification and Quality Assurance Institute (ACQUIN) in June 2009. ACQUIN is a non-profit agency committed to supporting the enhancement of quality standards for teaching and learning in higher education worldwide. It is a full member of the European Association for Quality Assurance in Higher Education and operates in Germany, Austria, Switzerland, Middle and Eastern Europe, North Africa, the Near and Middle East.

The international accreditation of GUtech is an assurance that students are receiving a world-class higher education in Oman. It also means that graduates have the possibility to continue their studies at RWTH Aachen University in Germany or at any other university of their choice - depending on the individual entry requirements of the respective university.

== Organizational structure ==
GUtech is owned by private Omani shareholders (OES), who are represented by the Board of Directors (BoD). The managing board of GUtech is the Board of Governors (BoG). Members of the Board of Governors are representatives of the shareholders, of RWTH Aachen University as well as of the governmental sector of both Oman and Germany.

The rectorate, which is chaired by Rector Michael Braun, manages the university. Wilfried Bauer is Deputy-Rector for Academic Affairs, and Hussain Al Salmi is Deputy-Rector for Administration and Finances.

In 2018, a total of 180 academic and administrative employees were employed at GUtech. The majority of the academic staff – around 70% – comes from Europe.

In May 2017, GUtech comprised four faculties:

- Faculty of Urban Planning and Architecture
- Faculty of Engineering and Computer Science
- Faculty of Business and Economics
- Faculty of Science

== See also ==
- Education in Oman
- List of universities and colleges in Oman
