= Al Kamil Wal Wafi =

Coordinates: 22.2201°N 59.2001°E

Al Kamil Wal Wafi الكامل والوافي
- Wilayat
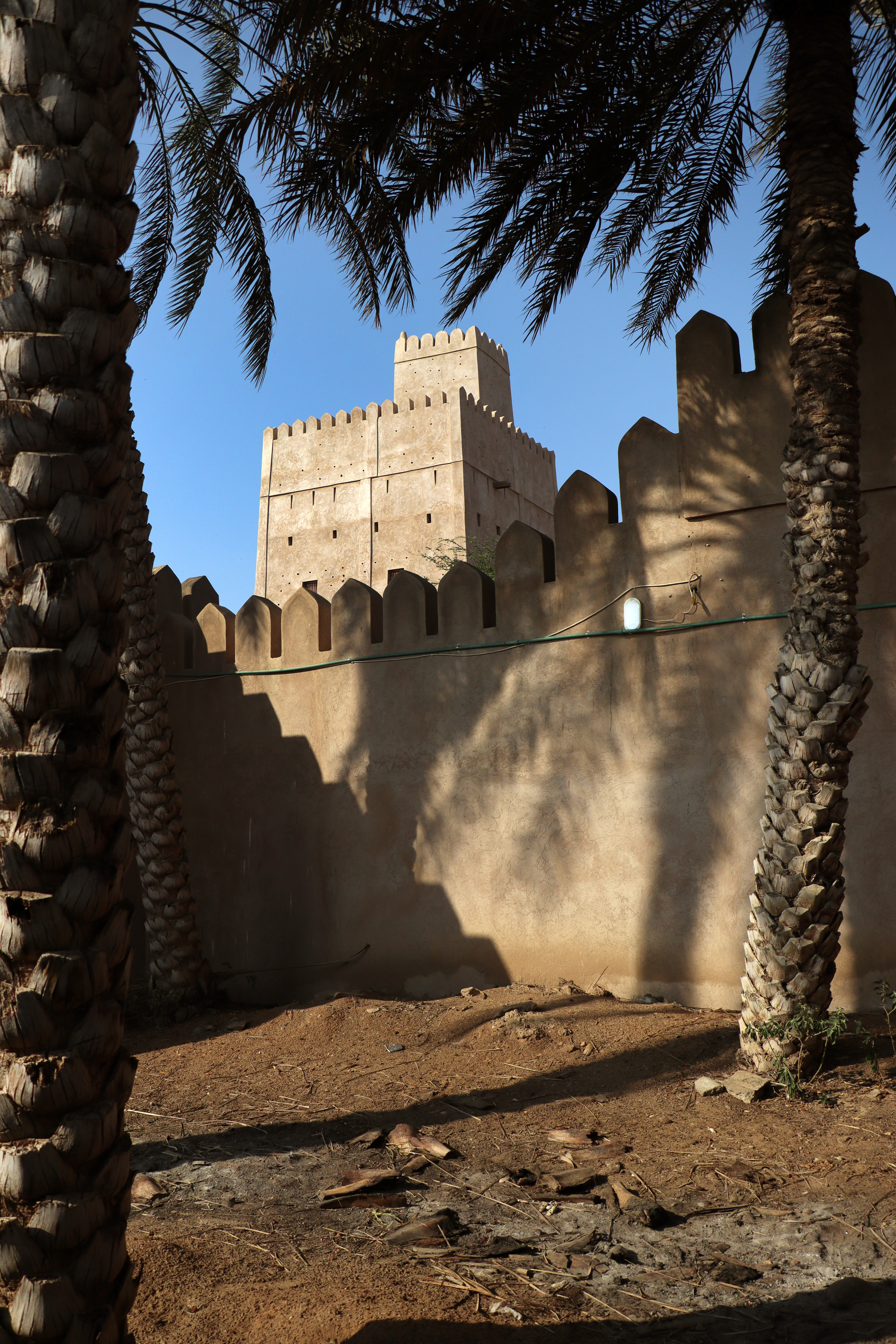
- Al Kamil Old Fort

- Location in Oman
- Country: Oman
- Governorate: Ash Sharqiyah South

Population (2020)
  - Total: 38,543

Al Kamil W'al Wafi is a region in the South Al Sharqiyah Governorate that is surrounded by the wilayats of Wadi Bani Khalid, Sur, and Jaalan Bani Bu Hassan to the north, west, and south, respectively. About 40 clusters make up its population centers, including Al-Kamil, Al-Wafi, Tawi Hatim, Tahwa, and Tawi.

The wilayats' symbol is made up of two towers and a tree. The two towers stand in for the important and crucial role that residents play in protecting the city and village, while the Al Sidr tree symbolizes the gathering spot where people congregated to share thoughts and opinions.

== Population ==
Year	Total population
1993	16,712
2000	19,825
2005	21,323
2010	22,816
2015	32,378
2020	38,543

== Natural attractions ==
The wilayat has sandy hills, golden dunes plains, and natural reserves, like the Al Saleel and Hasina Reservers. A chain of high mountains surrounds it from the north and east, and the settlements of Seeq, Sabt, and Tahwa have huge and stunning pools.

== Touristic attractions ==
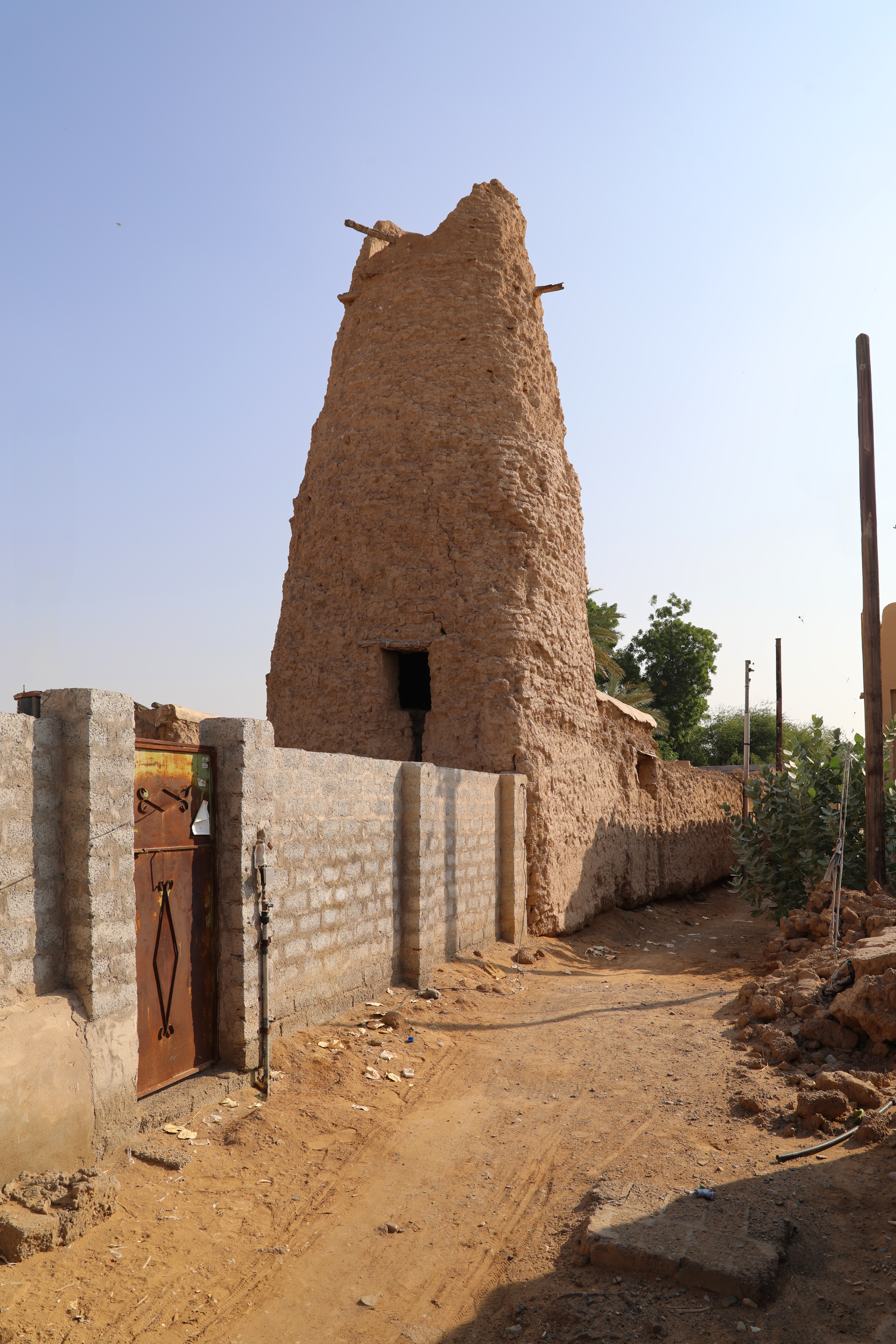
Muddy tower in Al Kamir town

The wilayat is well known for its historic forts and mosques, including Al Jame in Al Wafi and Al Sharia in Al Kamil. There are also muddy homes and archaeological tombs. Despite the aridity of the area, this traditional village has a year-round supply of fresh water thanks to wells that have been drilled nearby. Visitors can explore the scenic surroundings of the village.

== Economic activities ==
Important endeavors that greatly boost the local economy are camel and horse breeding. Most of these traditional activities are based in Wadi Al Batha, which is in the wilayat's western region.The population of the wilayat work in the industries of pottery, carpentry, textiles, dagger and sword production, and livestock raising.
