= Sultan Haitham City =

Planned city in Seeb, Oman

- City
- Location within Oman
- Coordinates: 23°40′50″N 58°05′22″E

Sultan Haitham City is a planned community in Seeb, Oman. The city is planned on an area of 14.8 square kilometres (5.7 sq mi).

== Geography ==
=== Location ===
Sultan Haitham City is located in Seeb governorate on an area of 14.8 square kilometers, accommodating 100,000 people, 20,000 residential units, 2.9 square kilometers of green spaces, and 19 integrated neighborhoods (detached villas/semi-detached villas/townhouses/apartments).

== Population ==
The city is planned to accommodate 100,000 people with 20,000 housing units.

== The plan ==
The main plan of the Smart Future City in Seeb offers an opportunity to develop a model that sets new standards in building sustainable cities while keeping pace with the requirements and aspirations of modern life for young people, as it consists of:

- Total land area: 14.8 square kilometers.
- Total green spaces: 2.9 square kilometers.
- Central Park and Valley: 1.6 square kilometers.
- Total population: 100,000 people.
- Number of housing units: 20,000.

== Phases ==
Sultan Haitham City includes four phases, starting in 2024 and ending in 2045. The city's implementation phases are:

- First phase: 2024 - 2030
- Second Phase: 2028 - 2034
- Third stage: 2033 - 2040
- Fourth stage: 2038 - 2045

The first phase of construction is scheduled to begin in 2024 and continue until 2030. This phase includes the development of the city center on an estimated area of about 5 square kilometers, which includes 6 modern and integrated neighborhoods with an estimated building area of about 2.2 square kilometers, the central park and valley reclamation is the heart of the city with an area of 1.6 square kilometers, and its integrated facilities with international standards to cover more than 35,000 people, it contains 6,743 residential units, including 608 detached villas, 872 semi-detached villas, 1,156 townhouses, and 4,107 apartments, 8 prayer places, a private hospital, a gas station, 4 school sites, and 19 office plots.

The second phase will be executed during the period (2028-2035) on an area of 2.6 square kilometers, accommodating more than 23,000 people and comprising 4,200 housing units and a building area of about 1.4 square kilometers.

The third phase will begin by 2033 and continue until 2040, and is located on an area of 2.3 square kilometers and accommodates more than 21,000 people, with 3,500 housing units and a construction area of 1.3 square kilometers.

The fourth and final phase of construction will begin by 2038 and continue until 2045, on an area of about 5.5 square kilometers, accommodating more than 26,000 people, and comprising 4,500 residential units on an estimated construction area of about 1.9 square kilometers.

== Infrastructure ==
=== Roads ===
The city offers a series of new connections to the city via the Muscat Highway and Sultan Qaboos Road, 23 different access points are available to achieve quick access and avoid congestion, the two existing main access points from Sultan Qaboos Street will be expanded. The bridges and underground sections will ensure a smooth flow of vehicles and add a new link to the intersection of Muscat Highway towards Barka, and Improve access through new intersections with the upgraded Halban Road and Al Salam Street, and improved access from Al Ma'abila through new intersections.

The proposed road network within the city provides a street system consisting of the Boulevard, a private street focused on pedestrians and public transportation facilities with a length of 3.4 km, 32 km of main city streets, 150 km of neighborhood streets, and 150 km of neighborhood corridors that allow for trams, electric scooters, or bicycles. 32 km of light and smart mobility, and 25 km of paths for walking and light mobility users (bicycles, etc.) to promote active mobility.

== Services ==
The city includes 25 mosques, mosques and prayers, 30 public schools, 9 private schools, 8 health centers, a hospital with 1200 beds, a modern care center for the elderly and people with disabilities, attractive shopping malls, covered and open gyms.

=== Health ===
- Class A health center (20,000 patients).
- Category B health center (10,000 patients).
- Reference Hospital (1,200 beds).
- Private hospital.
- Disability and Elderly Care Center

=== Education ===
- Government high schools.
- Governmental preparatory schools.
- Government basic education schools.
- Private high schools.
- Private middle schools.
- Private basic education schools.
- University.

== See also ==
- A’Thuraya City
