= Seeb =

Seeb السِّيْب
- Province
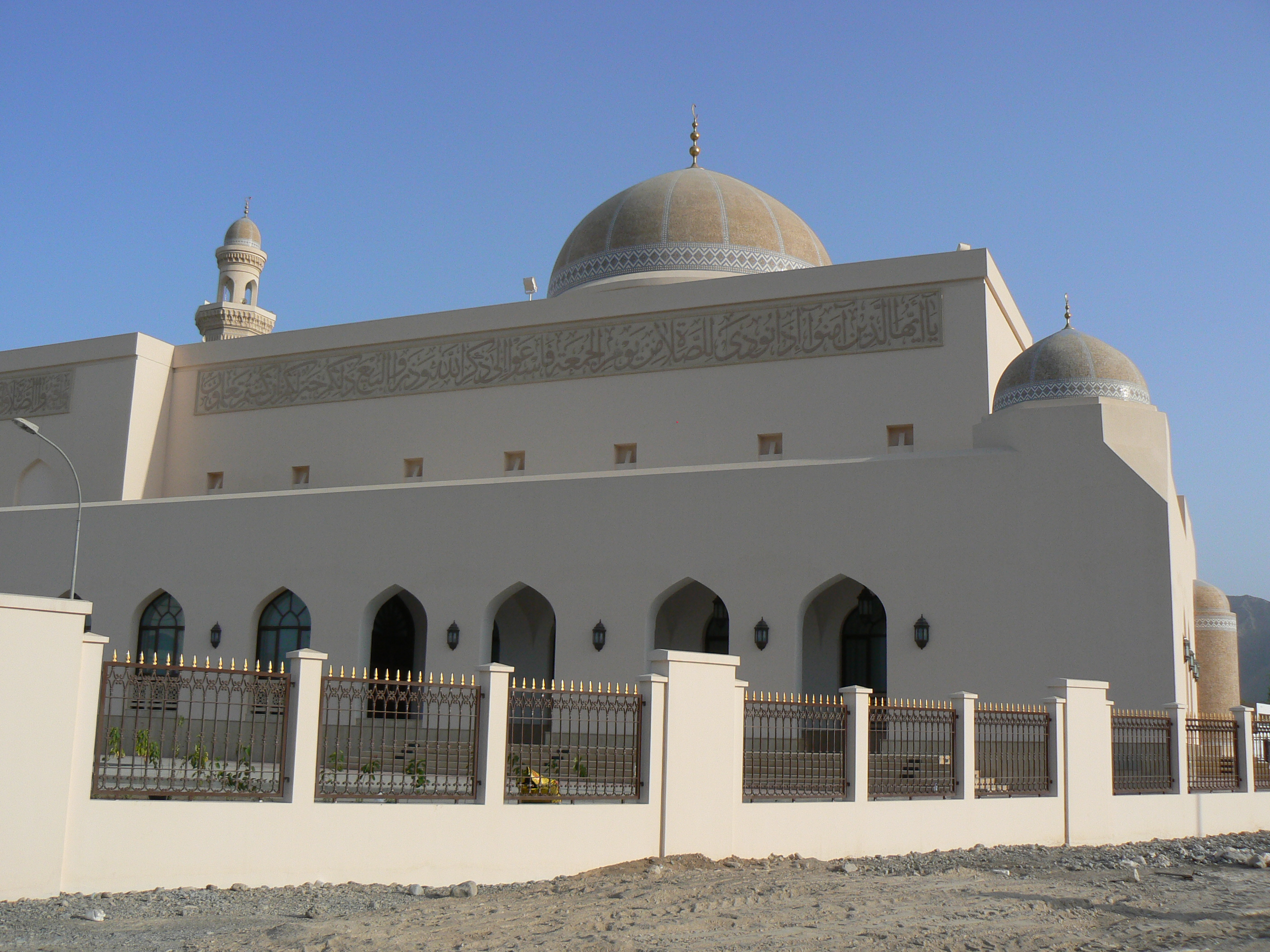
- A mosque in As-Seeb
- Interactive map outlining as Seeb Province
- Location in Oman Seeb (Middle East) Seeb (West and Central Asia)
- Coordinates: 23°40′49″N 58°10′57″E
- Country: Oman
- Region: Muscat

Population (2020)
  - Total: 470,878
- Time zone: UTC+4 (+4)

Al-Seeb, alternatively known as As Seeb, As Sib, or Seeb (Arabic: ٱلسِّيْب, romanized: As-Sīb) is a coastal fishing province, located several kilometres northwest of Muscat, in northeastern Oman. At the 2020 census, it had a population of 470,878.

Landmarks include Burj Al Sahwa, the Naseem Garden, the Royal Stables and Equestrian Centre, Royal Guard of Oman Technical College, Al Baraka Palace, Muscat International Airport and Markaz al Bahja.

== History ==
The "Fort of Sibo" was located here. It complemented the defence of Muscat Square, which was one of its first and most important roles. It was part of a series of fortified cities established by the Portuguese in order to control access to the Persian Gulf and the Gulf of Oman, like Khor Fakan, Muscat, Sohar, Seeb, Qurayyat and Muttrah. The fort has now been demolished, with Muscat International Airport standing at the site today. As-Seeb is known for being the venue in which the Treaty of Seeb agreement took place between the Imamate of Oman and the Sultanate of Muscat on 25 September 1920. This treaty divided Oman into two distinct regions, the hinterland and the coast, which were separated historically by the Hajar Mountains.

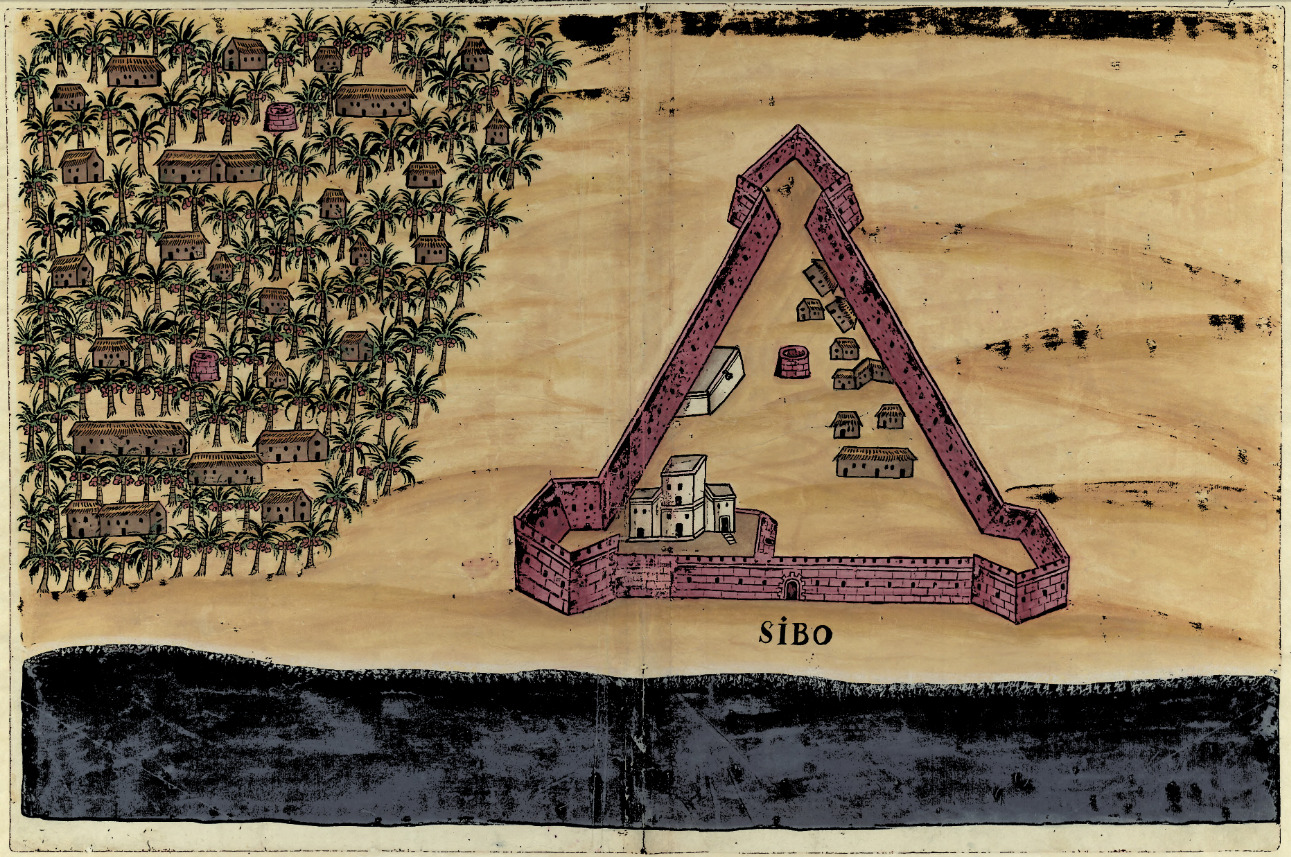
Portuguese Fortress of Seeb (Sibo). Livro das plantas de todas as fortalezas, cidades e povoaçoens do Estado da India Oriental / António Bocarro [1635].

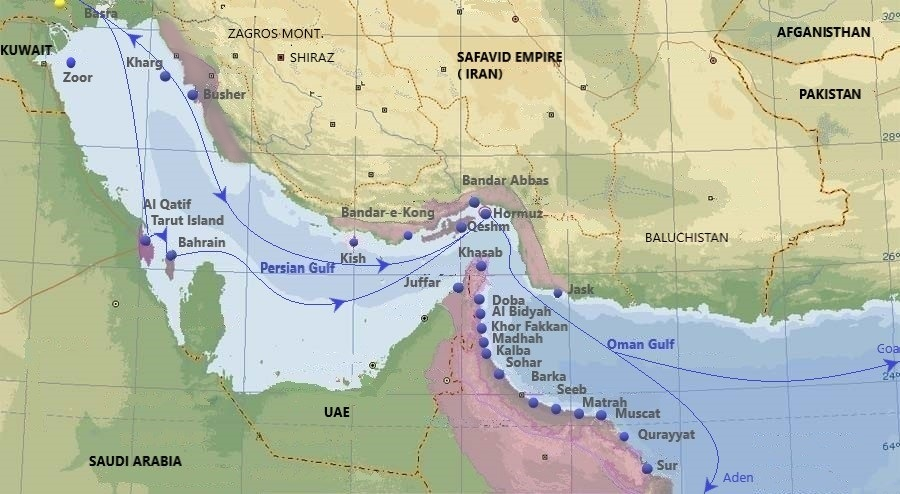
Main cities, ports and routes of the Portuguese Empire in the Persian Gulf in the 16th and 17th centuries

== Regions ==
The province has many different district that are diverse in culture and nature, these include Al Khoudh, where Sultan Qaboos University is located, Al-Mabellah, Al-Hail, Al Mawaleh and Rusayl.

== Roads ==
There are two numbered roads linking Seeb with the rest of the provinces: Muscat Expressway (N1) and the N5.

== Intelligence gathering ==
In June 2014 The Register disclosed that Seeb is the location of a "beyond top secret" GCHQ internet monitoring site.

== Sports ==
Al-Seeb Club and Al-Shabab are located in Seeb.

== Wadi Al-Khoudh ==
Wadi Al-Khoudh is a Valley in Seeb which is a major tourist attraction for locals and foreigners, and it is located near Old Al-Khoudh Village in the state. The valley is most popular for off-road adventurers. The valley has a beautiful mixture of mesmerizing sights varying from clear water pools, green outcrops, and rock formations and is recommended for a picnic.

== Sultan Haitham City ==
In May 2023, Sultan Haitham bin Tariq inaugurated the new Sultan Haitham City that will be built on an area of approximately fifteen million square meters of undeveloped land in Seeb. The intention for the new city is to house 100,000 residents from Muscat's growing population. There will be nearly three million square meters of green spaces including a central park. The city will be organized into nineteen walkable neighborhoods with thirty-nine schools, eleven health facilities, and a university. Construction began in February 2024 and phase one is expected to be completed by 2030.

== Climate ==
Seeb has a hot desert climate (Köppen climate classification BWh) with very hot summers and warm winters. Precipitation is low, and falls mainly in the months from December to April.

Climate data for Seeb
Month	Jan	Feb	Mar	Apr	May	Jun	Jul	Aug	Sep	Oct	Nov	Dec	Year
Record high °C (°F)	34.2 (93.6)	37.0 (98.6)	41.4 (106.5)	44.0 (111.2)	47.0 (116.6)	48.3 (118.9)	49.2 (120.6)	46.8 (116.2)	43.6 (110.5)	42.0 (107.6)	37.8 (100.0)	33.0 (91.4)	49.2 (120.6)
Mean daily maximum °C (°F)	25.5 (77.9)	26.1 (79.0)	29.8 (85.6)	34.7 (94.5)	39.5 (103.1)	40.4 (104.7)	38.6 (101.5)	36.2 (97.2)	36.3 (97.3)	35.0 (95.0)	30.5 (86.9)	27.1 (80.8)	33.3 (92.0)
Daily mean °C (°F)	21.3 (70.3)	21.9 (71.4)	25.2 (77.4)	29.8 (85.6)	34.2 (93.6)	35.2 (95.4)	34.3 (93.7)	32.0 (89.6)	31.4 (88.5)	29.7 (85.5)	25.7 (78.3)	22.6 (72.7)	28.6 (83.5)
Mean daily minimum °C (°F)	17.3 (63.1)	17.6 (63.7)	20.7 (69.3)	24.7 (76.5)	29.1 (84.4)	30.6 (87.1)	30.4 (86.7)	28.4 (83.1)	27.5 (81.5)	24.9 (76.8)	20.9 (69.6)	18.5 (65.3)	24.2 (75.6)
Record low °C (°F)	11.5 (52.7)	12.5 (54.5)	14.4 (57.9)	17.5 (63.5)	19.6 (67.3)	24.5 (76.1)	25.0 (77.0)	23.3 (73.9)	23.0 (73.4)	17.5 (63.5)	14.3 (57.7)	14.4 (57.9)	11.5 (52.7)
Average precipitation mm (inches)	12.8 (0.50)	24.5 (0.96)	15.9 (0.63)	17.1 (0.67)	7.0 (0.28)	0.9 (0.04)	0.2 (0.01)	0.8 (0.03)	0.0 (0.0)	1.0 (0.04)	6.8 (0.27)	13.3 (0.52)	100.3 (3.95)
Average relative humidity (%)	63	64	58	45	42	49	60	67	63	55	60	65	58
Mean monthly sunshine hours	268.6	244.8	278.3	292.5	347.4	325.7	277.7	278.6	303.9	316.9	291.9	267.0	3,493.3
Source: NOAA (1979–1990)
