= Jalan Bani Bu Ali =

Jalan Bani Bu Ali ولاية جعلان بني بو علي
- Village
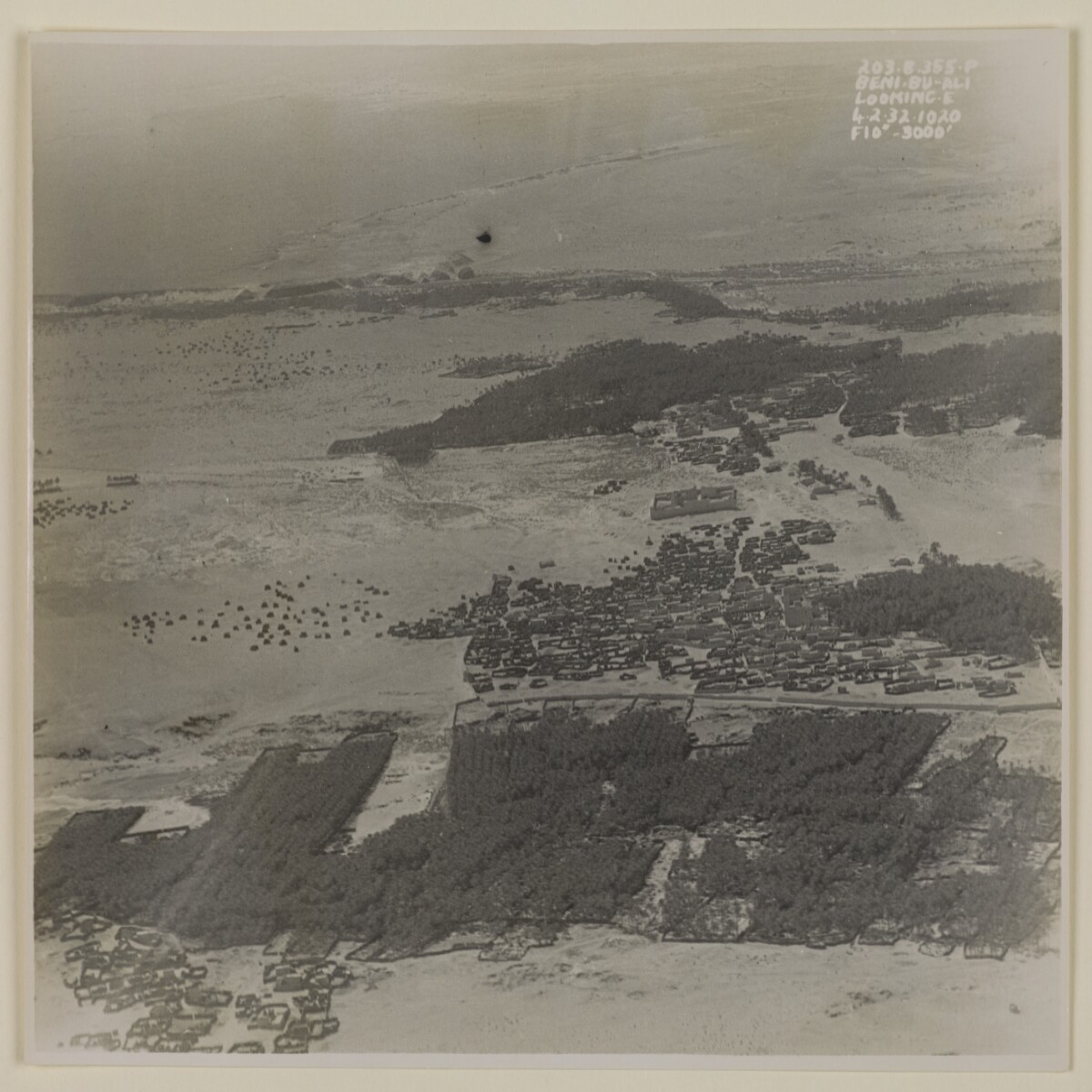
- aerial view of Jalan Bani Bu Ali looking east on 4 February 1932

- Location in Oman
- Coordinates: 22°00′48″N 59°12′21″E
- Country: Oman
- Region: Ash Sharqiyah South Governorate
- Time zone: UTC+4 (Oman Standard Time)

Jalan Bani Bu Ali (Arabic: ولاية جعلان بني بو علي; also transliterated as Jalan Bani Buali) is a commercial town and tourist destination in Oman.

There are many shops and supermarkets, but most famous is the traditional souq. This suq is in the south of the town about 1km from the centre and is open on Friday morning. In this suq there are many modern and traditional goods. Also there are many wadis which contain different types of trees and sand dunes with pools of standing water between them. These islands of vegetation play a role in creating a micro-climate. In summer when everywhere in Oman is hot, Jalan has its own rainy season, which affects the harvest of agricultural products. The coast receives many visitors from different parts of the world.

The town is the site of an expedition in 1821 by the forces of the British East India Company in support of the Sultan of Oman when local Arab tribes rebelled, turned pirate and plundered British ships in the Gulf of Oman.
