= Ash Sharqiyah South Governorate =

Governorate of Oman

Ash-Sharqīyah South Governorate مُحَافَظَة جَنُوب ٱلشَّرْقِيَّة Muḥāfaẓat Janūb aš-Šarqīyah
- Governorate

- Location of the Governorate in Oman
- Coordinates: 22.566667°N 59.528889°E
- Country: Oman
- Seat: Sur, Oman

Government
  - Type: Governorate
  - Governor: Yahya bin Bader bin Malik Al Mawaali

Population (2020 census)
  - Total: 315,460
- Time zone: UTC+4 (GST)
- ISO 3166 code: OM-SJ

Ash Sharqiyah South Governorate (Arabic: مُحَافَظَة جَنُوب ٱلشَّرْقِيَّة, romanized: Muḥāfaẓat Janūb aš-Šarqīyah, English: Southeastern Governorate) is a governorate of Oman. It was created on 28 October 2011 when Ash Sharqiyah Region was split into Ash Sharqiyah North Governorate and Ash Sharqiyah South Governorate. The centre of the governorate is the Wilayat of Sur.

== Provinces ==
Ash Sharqiyah South Governorate consists of five wilāyāt (provinces):

- Sur (Arabic: صور), population (2017): 121,088, (2020): 111,231
- Al-Kamil and Al-Wafi (Arabic: الكامل والوافي), population (2017): 33,341, (2020): 38,543
- Jalan Bani Bu Hassan (Arabic: جعلان بني بو حسن), population (2017): 42,168, (2020): 44,593
- Jalan Bani Bu Ali (Arabic: جعلان بني بو علي), population (2017): 100,506, (2020): 107,867
- Masirah (Arabic: مصيرة), population (2017): 15,719, (2020): 13,902

== Demographics ==
Historical population
Census year	Pop.	±% p.a.
1993	139,985	—
2003	173,670	+2.18%
2010	188,032	+1.14%
2020	315,445	+5.31%
Source: Citypopulation

== See also ==
- Eastern Arabia
- Sharqiya Sands
