= N5 road (Oman) =

Road in the Sultanate of Oman

National Road N5
- Sultan Qaboos Road
- N5 highlighted in red
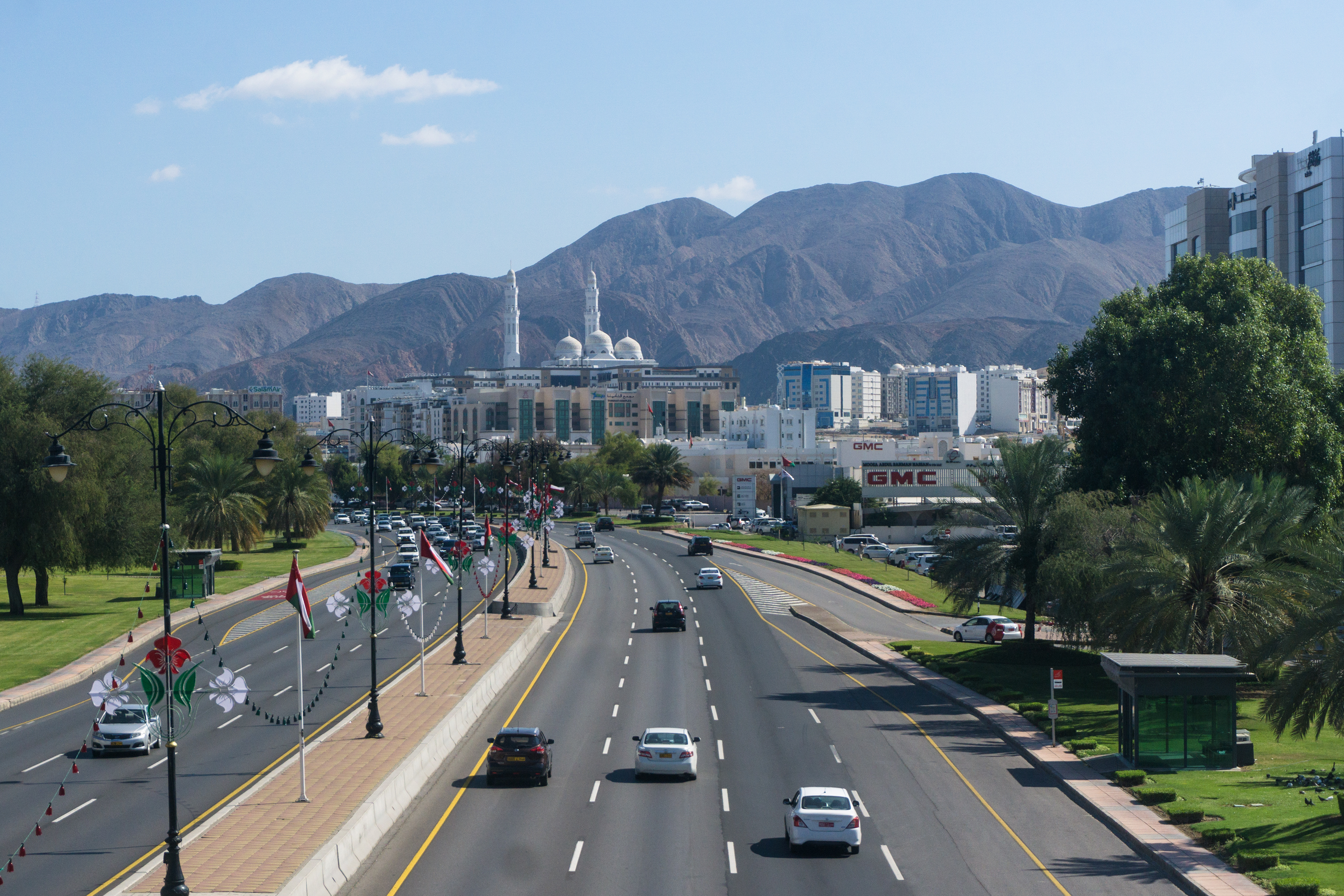
- The N5 in al Ghubra

Route information
- Part of
- Length: 306 km (190 mi)
- Existed: 1974–present

Major junctions
- East end: Wadi Adai Interchange
- A2 - Muscat - Qurayyat - Sur Road; N1 - Muscat Expressway; S26 - Qurum Heights Road; S25 - Al Ghubrah Street; S23 - Muscat International Airport Road; N2 - Sultan Thuwaini bin Said Road; S29 - Al Murtafa'a Street; S21 - Al Khoud Street; S20 - As Salam Street; A1 - Sultan Taimur bin Faisal Road; A7 - Barka - al Rustaq Road; A6 - Al Musannah - Al Rustaq - Maskin - Ibri Road; S18 - al Suwaiq - al Hawquin Road; S17 - Al Khaburah - Ibri Road; S16 - Hijari - Al Hujayrimat Road; S15 - Dhuwayhir Road; A5 - Sohar - Yanqul - Ibri Road; N6 - Sohar - al Buraimi Road; N7 - Al Aqar - Al Wajajah - Al Rawdah Road; S10 - Aswad Road; A1 - Sultan Taimur bin Faisal Road; N1 - Batinah Expressway
- West end: Khatmat Malaha

Location
- Country: Oman
- Major cities: Matrah, Bawshar, Seeb, Barka, Musannah, Al Suwaiq, Saham, Sohar, Liwa, Shinas

Highway system
- Transport in Oman

The N5, also officially known as Sultan Qaboos Road (Arabic: طريق السلطان قابوس) and formerly designated as Route 1 (Arabic: طريق ١), is a national road in the Sultanate of Oman, connecting Muscat, the capital city in the Sultanate and a hub for commercial activity, to the many coastal cities of Oman that sit alongside the Sea of Oman such as Seeb and Sohar. It also connects Muscat to the United Arab Emirates. It is named after the well-known Omani sultan, Late Sultan Qaboos bin Said.

== Route description ==
The N5 begins in Muttrah which contains many important ministry buildings and most prominently the parliament building called Majlis Oman. After the roundabout it goes through the Muttrah Corniche. After the Corniche it goes through two roundabouts and then splits into two; one goes to the root of the city of Ruwi while the other continues straight passing through the suburbs of Qurum. Both roads merge becoming a dual carriageway with three lanes per carriageway and leaves westward. From there the route continues crossing through many cities and the Muscat International Airport. After entering province of Seeb the route becomes a four-lane dual carriageway with two lanes in each direction and staying like so until the end of the route. After entering the Governorate of South Al Batinah the route starts to have oval-shaped landmark roundabouts and typically from this part of the route all the way to the border crossing the route is called Al Batinah Highway. Through South Al Batinah the route passes through many important and big cities such as Barka and Al Suwaiq. From there, the route continues through the Governorate of North Al Batinah passing through many major cities such as the city of Saham and the city of Sohar all the way to the border crossing of Khatmat Malaha.

== History ==
The N5 opened in 1974 becoming one of the first major highways in Oman as during this time Oman was going through major changes as change of sultans meant the country was undergoing modernization by the late Qaboos bin Said and one of his first projects to be completed was to connect the country via a road network. The N5 was the first one to be completed, going from the capital of Muscat all the way to the border of the United Arab Emirates while passing through very important and historical cities such as Sohar and Seeb. After the N5 was opened the cities that the route passed on experienced massive growth as the highway became the epicenter of Oman.

In the mid-2000s, many landmark roundabouts in the Muscat section of the route were changed to traffic light junctions to improve traffic flow.

In 2019 the Ministry of Transport issued a new Road Numbering and Classification Guide which included the reclassification of Route 1 into the N5.

In January 2025, royal directives were issued in Oman to change names of several roads, including the N5 road which is now known as the Sultan Qaboos Road.

== See also ==
- Transport in Oman
- 1970 Omani coup d'état
