= Al Khawd =

Al Khawd الخوض
- Village
- Location in Oman
- Coordinates: 23°34′N 58°07′E
- Country: Oman
- Governorate: Muscat Governorate
- Time zone: UTC+4 (Oman Standard Time)

Al Khawd is a village in Muscat, in northeastern Oman.
