= Al Ashkharah =

- Location in Oman
- Coordinates: 21°51′N 59°34′E
- Country: Oman
- Subdivision: Ash Sharqiyah Region

Al Ashkharah (Arabic: الأشخرة) (named after a poisonous desert plant) is a town in the Ash Sharqiyah Region of Oman and is 80km from Ras al-Hadd and 90km from Ras al-Jinz. It is part of the J'alan area and can be considered as the key city of this area in addition to Ja'lan. The city's main economic activity is fishing and is famous for catching big fish from shore. Tides are very rough compared to shores in muscat.

In 1874, British diplomat Samuel Barrett Miles sailed to several Arabic-speaking countries including Al Ashkharah.
