= Sur, Oman =

Sur صُوْر
- City
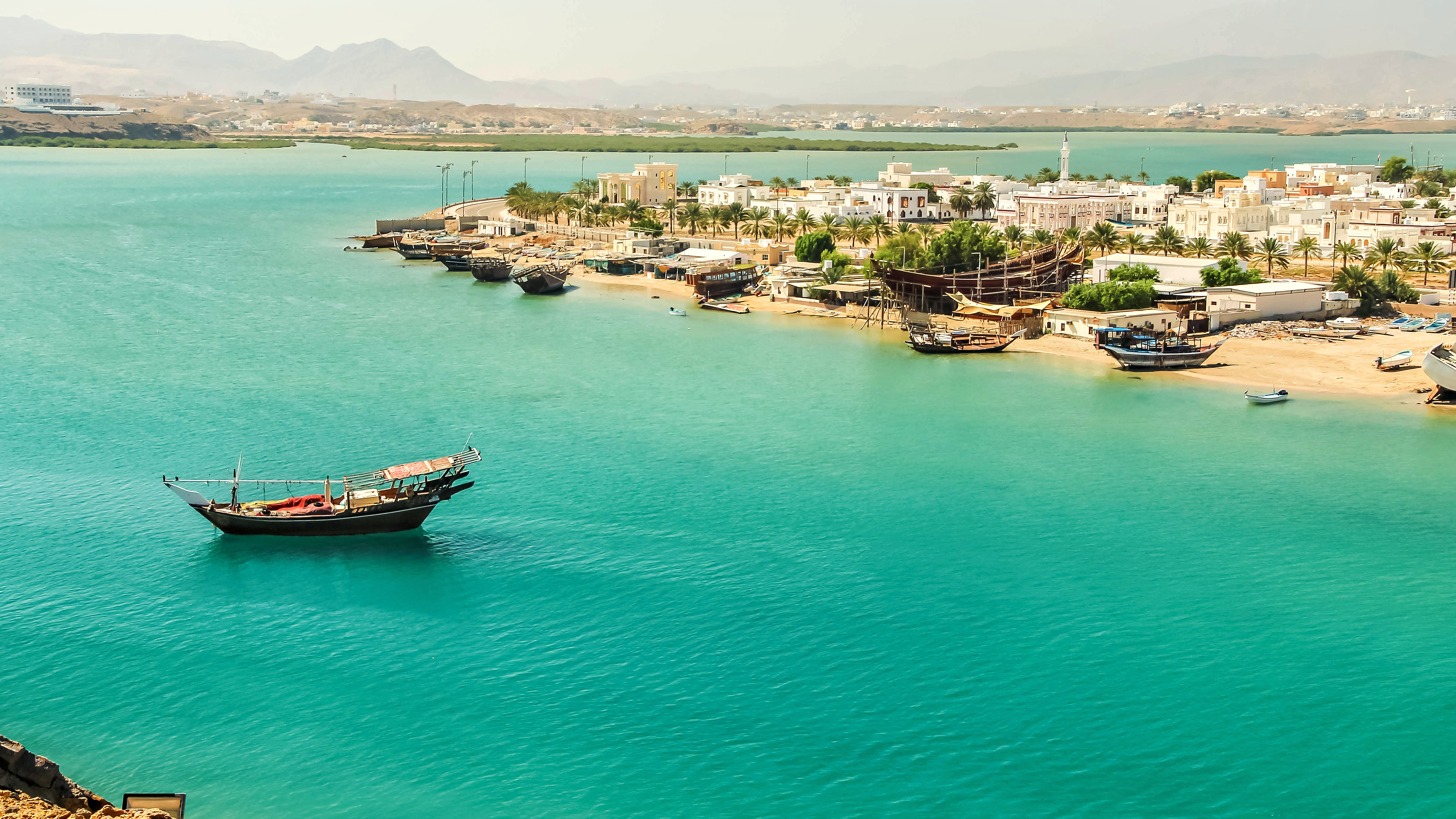

- Location in Oman
- Coordinates: 22°34′0″N 59°31′44″E
- Country: Oman
- Region: Ash Sharqiyah Region
- Governorate: Ash Sharqiyah South Governorate
- Elevation: 13.1 ft (4.0 m)

Population (2023)
  - Total: 122,533
- Time zone: UTC+4 (+4)
- Postal code: 411

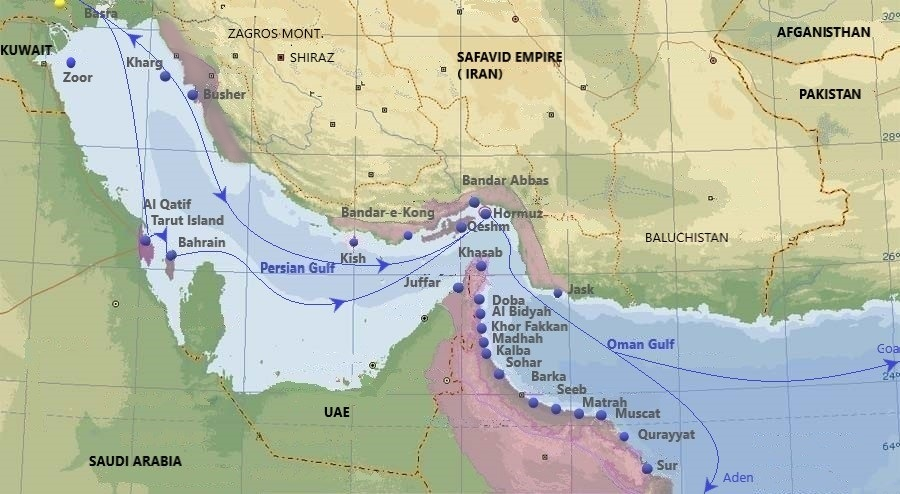
Purple - Portuguese in Persian Gulf in the 16th and 17th centuries. Main cities, ports and routes.

Sur (Arabic: صُوْر, romanized: Ṣūr) is the capital city of Ash Sharqiyah South Governorate, and the former capital of Ash Sharqiyah Region in northeastern Oman, on the coast of the Gulf of Oman. It is located about 126 miles (203 km) southeast of the Omani capital Muscat. Historically, the city is known for being an important destination point for sailors. Today, the sea still plays an important part of life in Sur.

== Geography ==
Nearby villages include Dughmur and Qalhat.

== History ==
By the 6th century, Sur was an established centre for trade with East Africa.

Ibn Battuta commented on his visit to this "roadstead of a large village on the seashore." In the 16th century, it was under Portuguese rule but was liberated by the Omani Imam Nasir ibn Murshid and underwent an economic revival, as a trade centre with India and East Africa. This continued until the mid-19th century, when the British outlawed the slave trade. The city was further ruined by the opening of the Suez Canal, which saw it lose trade with India.

=== 1937 Plane crash ===
In 1937, a Vickers Vincent operated by No. 84 Squadron RAF crashed in Khor Gharma while in its initial climb, killing all three crew members. At the time, it was the worst and first plane crash in Omani history.

== Education ==
The main college in Sur is the Sur College of Applied Sciences. The college has over 4000 students and offers degrees in Business, Communication, Information Technology and Design and Applied Biotechnology. It is considered one of the better institutions of higher learning in Oman. The second college is Sur University College. There is an Indian school, Indian School Sur which offers classes up to Grade 12.

== Shipbuilding ==
It is one of the famous cities in the Persian Gulf region in building wooden ships. Its historical location gives it the hand to monitor the Gulf of Oman and the Indian Ocean. Many ships have been built in this city, like the sambuk and ghanjah. They formerly went as far as China, India, Zanzibar, Iraq and many other countries. These vessels were also used in pearl fishing.

== Ras al-Hadd & Ras al-Jinz beaches ==
About 60 kilometers away from Sur, lies the Ras Al Jinz Turtle Reserve along the coastline. The endangered green sea turtles (Chelonia mydas) seek refuge here, especially on the Ras Al Jinz Beach, a part of Ras Al Hadd, annually for nesting. The number of turtles nesting in this area is estimated to range between 6,000 and 13,000. The beach is also known for its coves and rocky formations along the shore, providing a sanctuary for various bird species.

Ras Al Hadd had a planned airport which began construction in 2011 but apart from laying down the runway, nothing more was constructed.

== Climate ==
Sur experiences a hot desert climate with very little rainfall and high temperatures. Because of its coastal location, Sur's night-time temperatures are never very low. There is no distinct wetter season, but March tends to be the wettest month, and September the driest.

Occasionally, Sur gets battered by cyclones. In 2007, Cyclone Gonu battered the city, and in 2010, Sur was hit by Cyclone Phet.

Climate data for Sur, Oman (1991–2020 normals, extremes 1977–2023)
| Month | Jan | Feb | Mar | Apr | May | Jun | Jul | Aug | Sep | Oct | Nov | Dec | Year |
|---|---|---|---|---|---|---|---|---|---|---|---|---|---|
| Record high °C (°F) | 35.0 (95.0) | 39.3 (102.7) | 42.0 (107.6) | 44.2 (111.6) | 49.0 (120.2) | 49.8 (121.6) | 48.0 (118.4) | 47.5 (117.5) | 45.4 (113.7) | 42.6 (108.7) | 39.0 (102.2) | 36.3 (97.3) | 49.8 (121.6) |
| Mean daily maximum °C (°F) | 26.4 (79.5) | 28.5 (83.3) | 31.9 (89.4) | 37.0 (98.6) | 41.3 (106.3) | 41.7 (107.1) | 40.6 (105.1) | 39.5 (103.1) | 38.8 (101.8) | 36.0 (96.8) | 31.0 (87.8) | 27.4 (81.3) | 35.0 (95.0) |
| Daily mean °C (°F) | 22.0 (71.6) | 23.3 (73.9) | 26.2 (79.2) | 30.7 (87.3) | 34.8 (94.6) | 35.3 (95.5) | 34.0 (93.2) | 32.5 (90.5) | 31.8 (89.2) | 29.8 (85.6) | 25.9 (78.6) | 23.1 (73.6) | 29.1 (84.4) |
| Mean daily minimum °C (°F) | 17.8 (64.0) | 19.1 (66.4) | 22.0 (71.6) | 26.5 (79.7) | 30.1 (86.2) | 30.5 (86.9) | 29.6 (85.3) | 28.2 (82.8) | 27.4 (81.3) | 25.4 (77.7) | 21.7 (71.1) | 18.9 (66.0) | 24.8 (76.6) |
| Record low °C (°F) | 7.0 (44.6) | 8.8 (47.8) | 9.6 (49.3) | 17.5 (63.5) | 21.0 (69.8) | 16.8 (62.2) | 17.2 (63.0) | 16.0 (60.8) | 15.0 (59.0) | 14.2 (57.6) | 9.0 (48.2) | 8.8 (47.8) | 7.0 (44.6) |
| Average precipitation mm (inches) | 11.0 (0.43) | 9.8 (0.39) | 17.2 (0.68) | 7.7 (0.30) | 1.7 (0.07) | 13.4 (0.53) | 3.2 (0.13) | 2.5 (0.10) | 0.0 (0.0) | 1.7 (0.07) | 3.3 (0.13) | 10.9 (0.43) | 82.4 (3.26) |
| Average precipitation days (≥ 1.0 mm) | 1.8 | 2.2 | 2.5 | 2.0 | 0.3 | 0.4 | 0.7 | 0.4 | 0.0 | 0.4 | 0.7 | 1.6 | 13 |
| Average relative humidity (%) | 69 | 70 | 63 | 56 | 53 | 56 | 59 | 65 | 63 | 60 | 66 | 69 | 62 |
Source 1: World Meteorological Organisation (UN)
Source 2: NOAA (extremes, mean, humidity, 1977-1990) Starlings Roost Weather

== Gallery ==
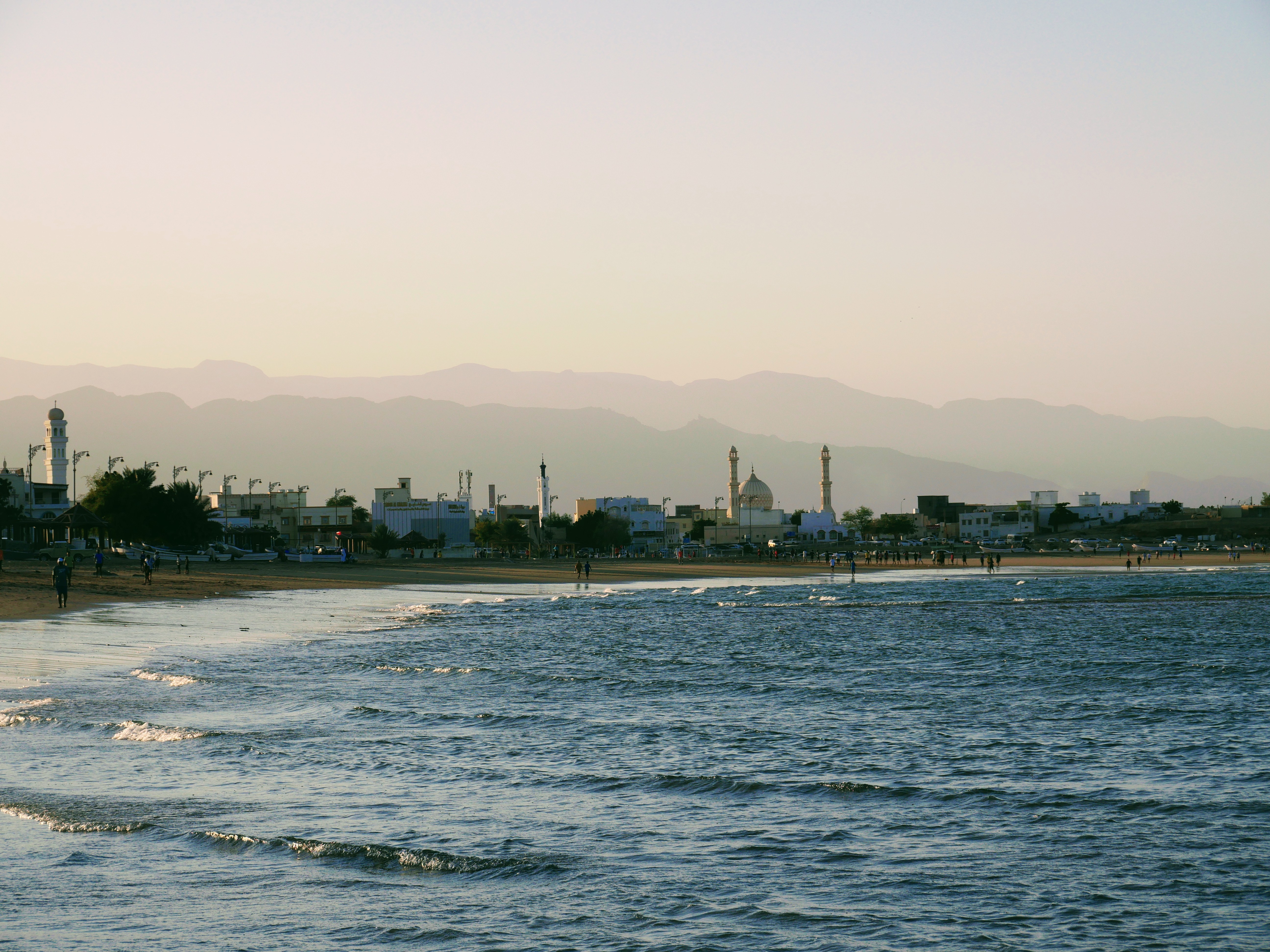
Beach in the sunset

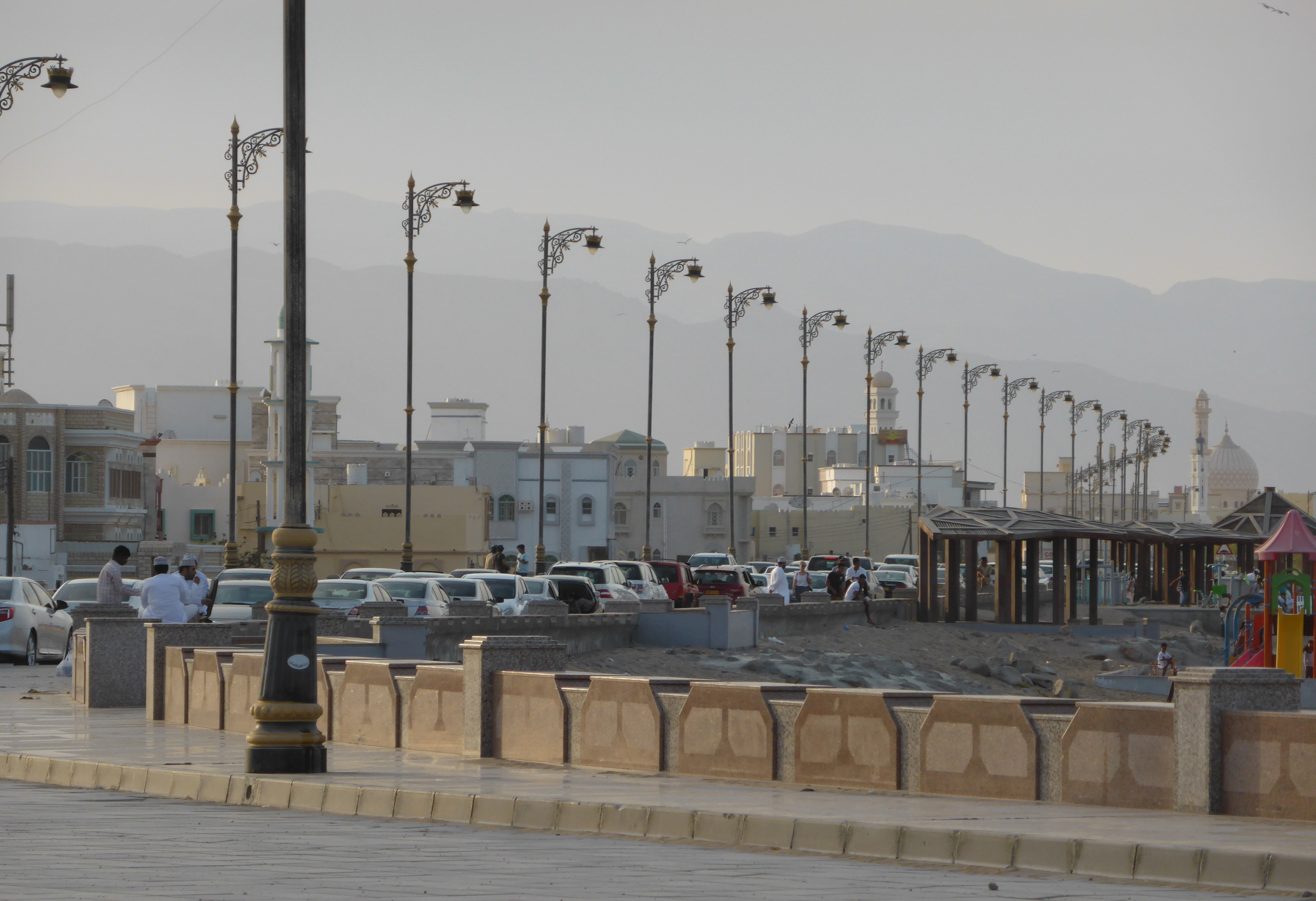
A street along the beach of the Gulf of Oman, with the Eastern Hajar Mountains in the background

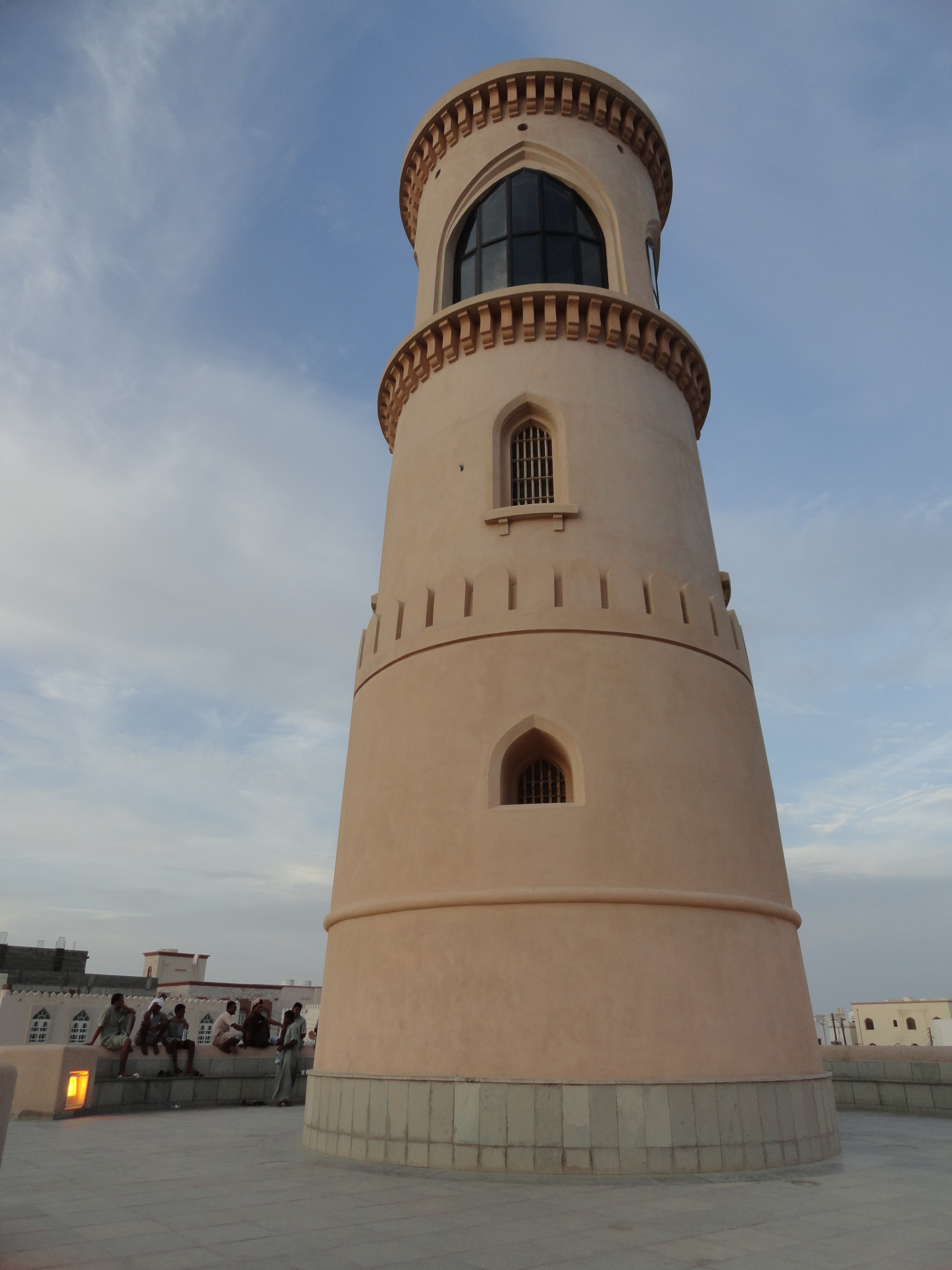
Sur Lighthouse

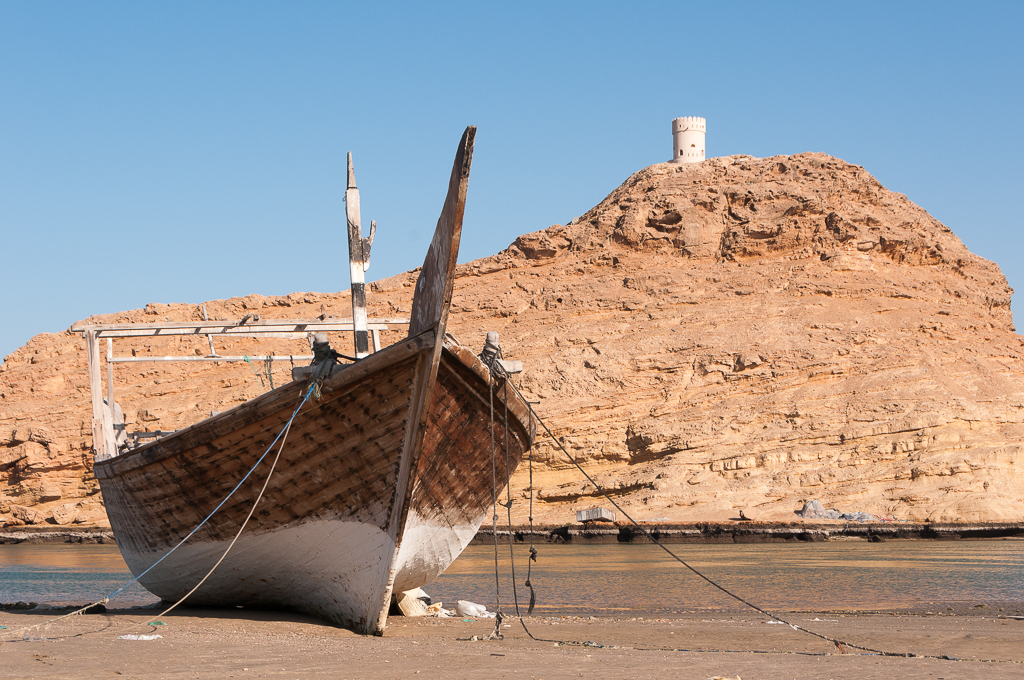
A docked dhow with Al-Ayjah Watchtower on top of the hill in the background

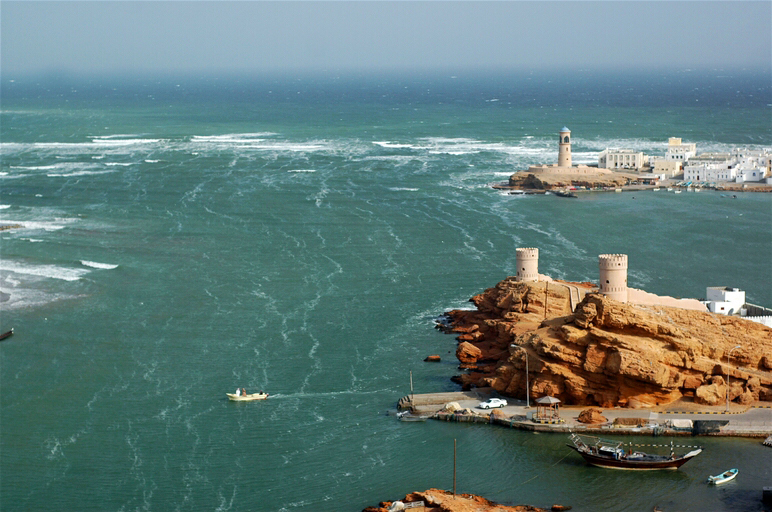
Watchtowers on hills overlooking the Arabian Sea

== Notable people ==
- Suhail Bahwan (born 1938/39), Omani billionaire businessman
- Salim Rashid Suri (circa 1910–1979), Omani musician
- Ahmed Mubarak Al-Mahaijri (born 1985), Omani footballer

== See also ==
- List of cities in Oman
- Archaeology of Oman
