= Halban, Oman =

Halban حلبان
- Village
- Location in Oman
- Coordinates: 23°35′N 58°02′E
- Country: Oman
- Governorate: Al Batinah South Governorate
- Time zone: UTC+4 (Oman Standard Time)

Halban is a village in Nakhal, Al Batinah South Governorate, in northeastern Oman. Halban is the home of the German University of Technology in Oman (GUtech) as well as the Arab Open University in Oman (AOU-Oman).
