= List of schools in Oman =

Following is a list of primary and secondary schools in the Asian country of Oman. Tertiary schools are included in the separate list of universities and colleges in Oman.

Most of these schools are located in Muscat, the capital of Oman.

== Omani ==
- Al Injaz Private School – Muscat
- Al Sahwa Schools – Muscat
- Al Shomoukh International School – Muscat
- Digital Private School – Muscat
- Madinat Al-Sultan Qaboos Private School – Muscat
- Modern Generation Private School – Ma'bilah, Muscat
- My School Oman – Muscat

== International ==
- Ahmed Bin Majid International School – Muscat
- Al Ibdaa International School – Muscat
- Aldhiya International School – Muscat
- American British Academy – Muscat
- A' Soud Global School – Muscat
- The American International School Muscat – Muscat
- Beaconhouse Private School – Muscat – Muscat
- British School Muscat – Muscat
- British School Salalah – Salalah
- Cheltenham Muscat – Muscat
- Downe House Muscat – Muscat
- Future Science International School – Sohar
- Innovators Private School – Muscat
- Lycée Français de Mascate – Muscat
- Muscat International School – Muscat
- Salalah International School – Salalah
- Sarh-Alibdaa International School – Muscat
- Sohar International School – Sohar
- Sultan's School – Seeb
- The Gulf International School – Muscat
- The International School of Choueifat – Muscat
- The International School of Oman – Muscat
- The Wave Private School – Muscat

== Expatriate ==
=== India ===
There are currently 22 Indian Schools in Oman, which are:

- Indian School Muscat - Darsait
- Indian School Al Ghubra - Ghubra
- Indian School Al Wadi Al Kabir – Wadi Kabir
- Indian School Darsait - Darsait
- Indian School Al Seeb - Seeb
- Indian School Al Maabela – Maabela
- Indian School Salalah - Salalah
- Indian School Sohar - Sohar
- Indian School Nizwa - Nizwa
- Indian School Muladha - Muladha
- Indian School Sur - Sur
- Indian School Ibri - Ibri
- Indian School Ibra - Ibra
- Indian School Jalan - Jalan Bani Bu Ali
- Indian School Rustaq - Rustaq
- Indian School Khasab - Khasab
- Indian School Al Buraimi - Buraimi
- Indian School Masirah - Masirah
- Indian School Thumrait - Thumrait
- Indian School Saham - Saham
- Indian School Bousher – Al Ansab
- Indian School Duqm - Duqm

South & Southeast Asia

- Pakistan School Muscat – Darsait, Muscat
- Pakistan School Nizwa - Nizwa
- Pakistan School Salalah - Salalah
- Philippine School Sultanate of Oman - Al Khuwair
- Sri Lankan School Muscat - Wadi Kabir
- Bangladesh School Muscat - Muscat

== See also ==
- Education in Oman
- Lists of schools
