= Indians in Oman =

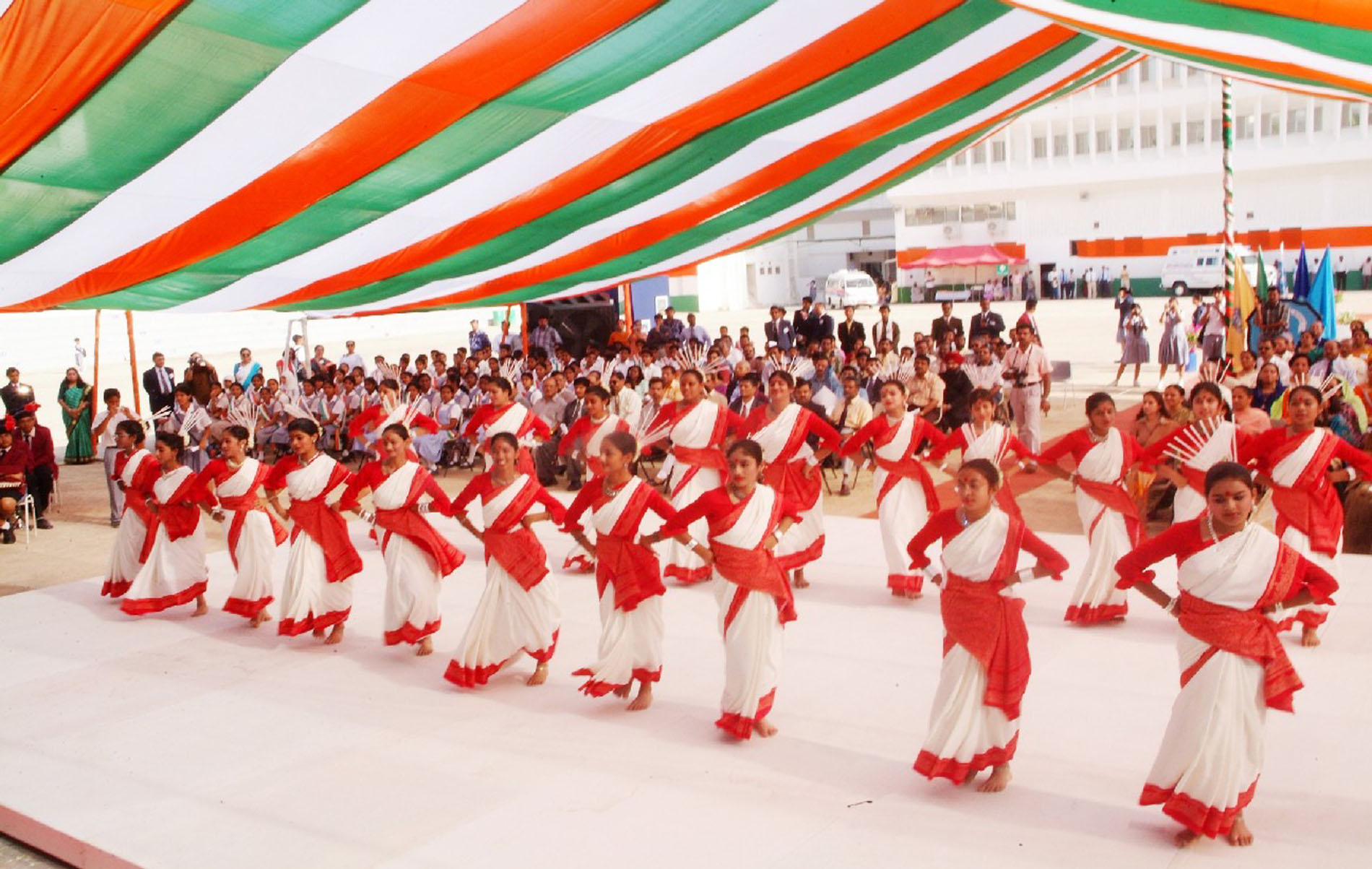
- Indian children participating in a cultural performance at Indian School, Muscat

Total population
- 684,770 people

Regions with significant populations
- Muscat

Languages
- Malayalam • Telugu • Urdu • Tamil • Gujarati • Marathi • English • Arabic • Kutchi · Odia • Sindhi · Punjabi · Hindi

Religion
- Islam • Christianity • Hinduism • Jainism · Sikhism · Buddhism

Related ethnic groups
- Person of Indian Origin

Indians in Oman are Indian expatriates in Oman, as well as Omani citizens of Indian origin or descent. As of early 2026, there are approximately 678,837 Indian nationals or individuals of Indian descent residing in Oman, with ~676,781 of them being Non-Resident Indians (NRI) and around 2,000 Persons of Indian Origin (PIO) holding Omani citizenship. This accounts for about 20% of Oman's total population.

== History ==
Although Indian migration to Oman is apparently for the purpose of spreading their commercial activities and mutually sharing the profits, their mutual good relations are believed to have existed as early as the 7th century. It was however, in 15th century since when the Indian merchants had started undertaking commercial activities in Muscat in a quite systematic manner. As an important port-town in the Gulf of Oman, Muscat attracted foreign tradesman and settlers, such as the Persians, the Balochs and Gujaratis.

The Indian community then consisted essentially of traders and financiers from Kutch and Sindh. Some of the earliest Indian immigrants to settle in Oman were the Bhatias of Kutch in Gujarat, who have had a powerful presence in Oman dating back to the 16th century. It was during the 19th century that some Khojas reached there, and who are presently well-integrated in Oman; some of them hold even ministerial positions. A few Indian families predominantly from Gujarat which have been living in Oman since many centuries, have developed their enterprises into the colossal business houses.

The settlement of the Indian migrants in Oman has become possible due to Omani government's liberal policy in granting citizenship; it is the only Arab country to do so. Any person who has completed at least 20 years in Oman is eligible to apply for citizenship. About a thousand Indians have so far became Omani citizens.

== Religion ==
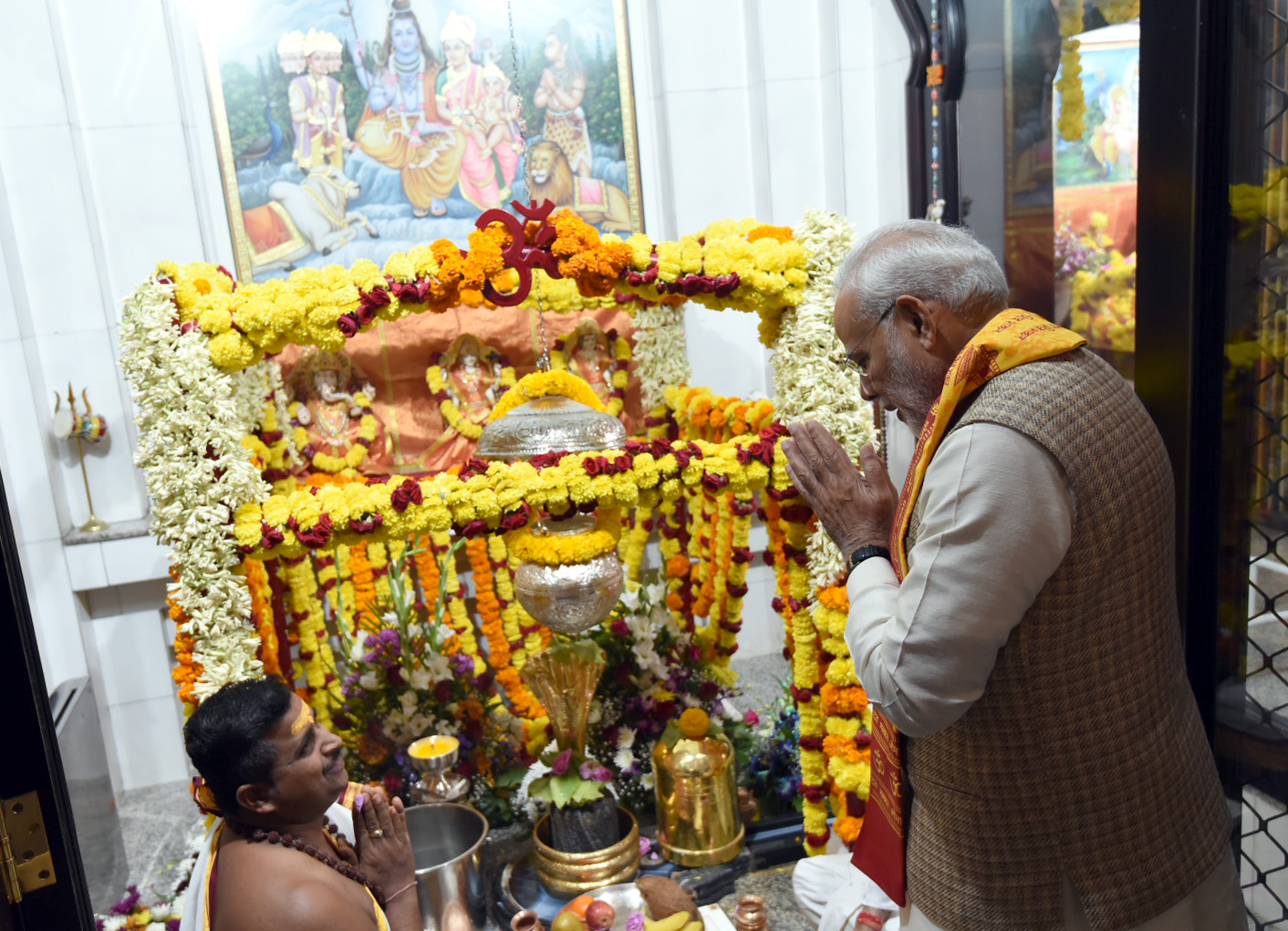
The Prime Minister, Shri Narendra Modi performed Abhishekam at the historic Lord Shiva temple in Muscat, Oman on February 12, 2018

Oman holds an exceptional position among all the Persian Gulf countries in terms of Basic Law of the State promulgated in December 1996, which guarantees the freedom of worship to all its inhabitants, irrespective of their religious beliefs. Such liberal policy of the government has made it possible that presently there are two Hindu temples where congregations are held regularly. One of these temples is more than a hundred years old. The Hindus have been granted the rights of cremation as per their religious rites. There are nearly four temporary gurudwaras (2 in Muscat, 1 in Salalah and Sohar each), which have been built in the labour camps. Oman also has seven churches for various Christian sects living in this country. Recently the Omani government has allowed the Indian Community to build a permanent gurudwara and a temple in Oman of the likes that are seen in India itself (The current temples and gurudwaras are small, temporary, and bounded to a compound).

== Demographics ==
The Indian community in Oman is regarded to be among the most prosperous communities in the country. At present, Indians constitute almost 20% of Oman's total population of 2.3 million (2010 census), as they are the largest expatriate community in the country. There are 448,000 Indian migrant workers in Oman. The Indians in Oman belong to various professions and businesses. Almost 25% of them are unskilled workers, 30% of them semi-skilled, and 35% are skilled ones. The other 10% consist of professionals such as engineers, bankers, financial experts, managers/executives and businesspeople. There are around 2,000 Indian doctors in Oman, who work in different hospitals and healthcare centers of the country.

Some of them are working with the local newspapers and magazines; particularly those being published in English. The majority of Indians in Oman come from Kerala, accounting for 60% of all Indian nationals in the country.

== Education ==
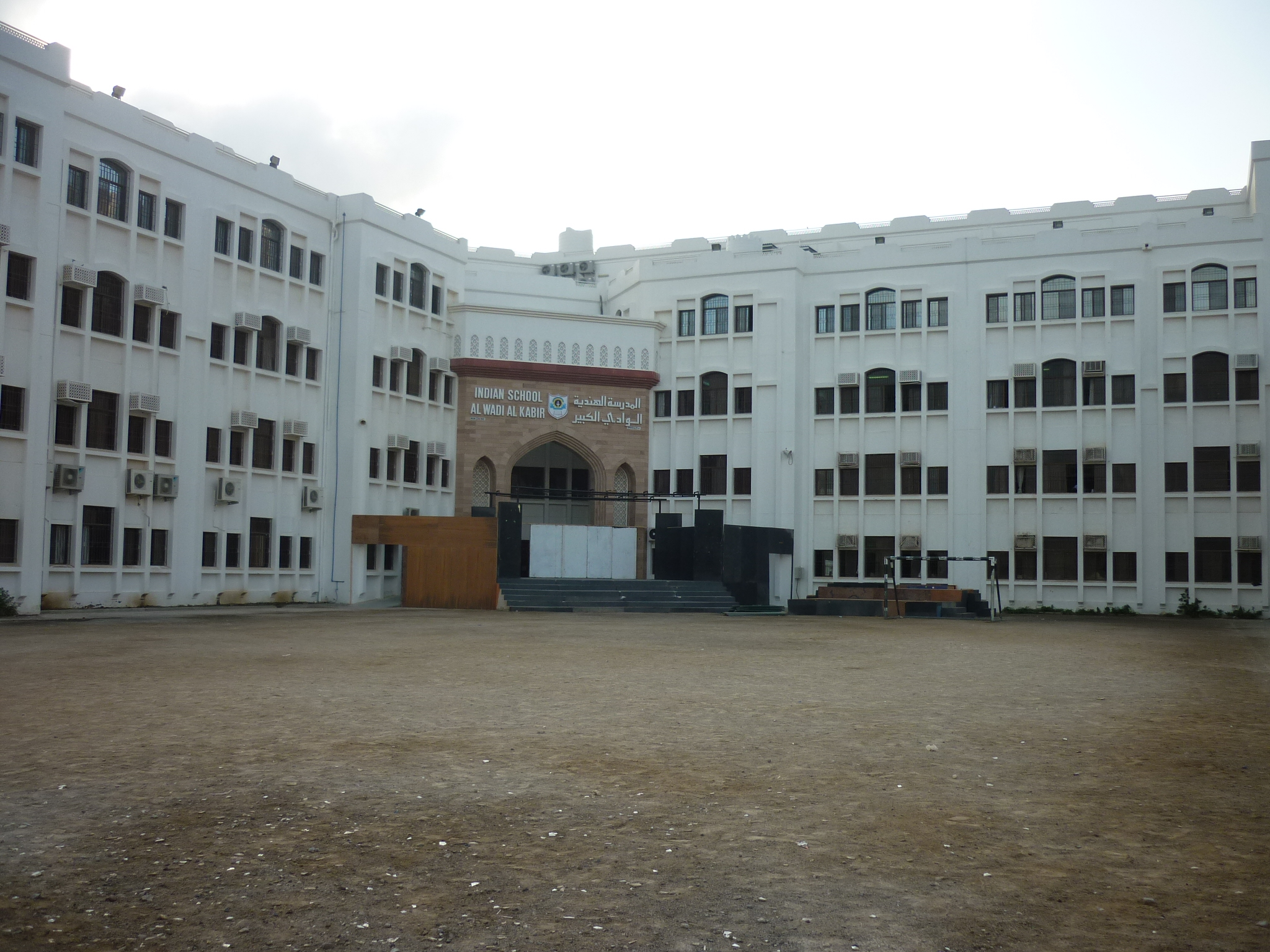
Indian School Al Wadi Al Kabir

There are 22 community-run schools in Oman that follow the Indian curriculum, with 47,465 total students enrolled. These schools primarily serve the Indian expatriate community in Oman. These are:

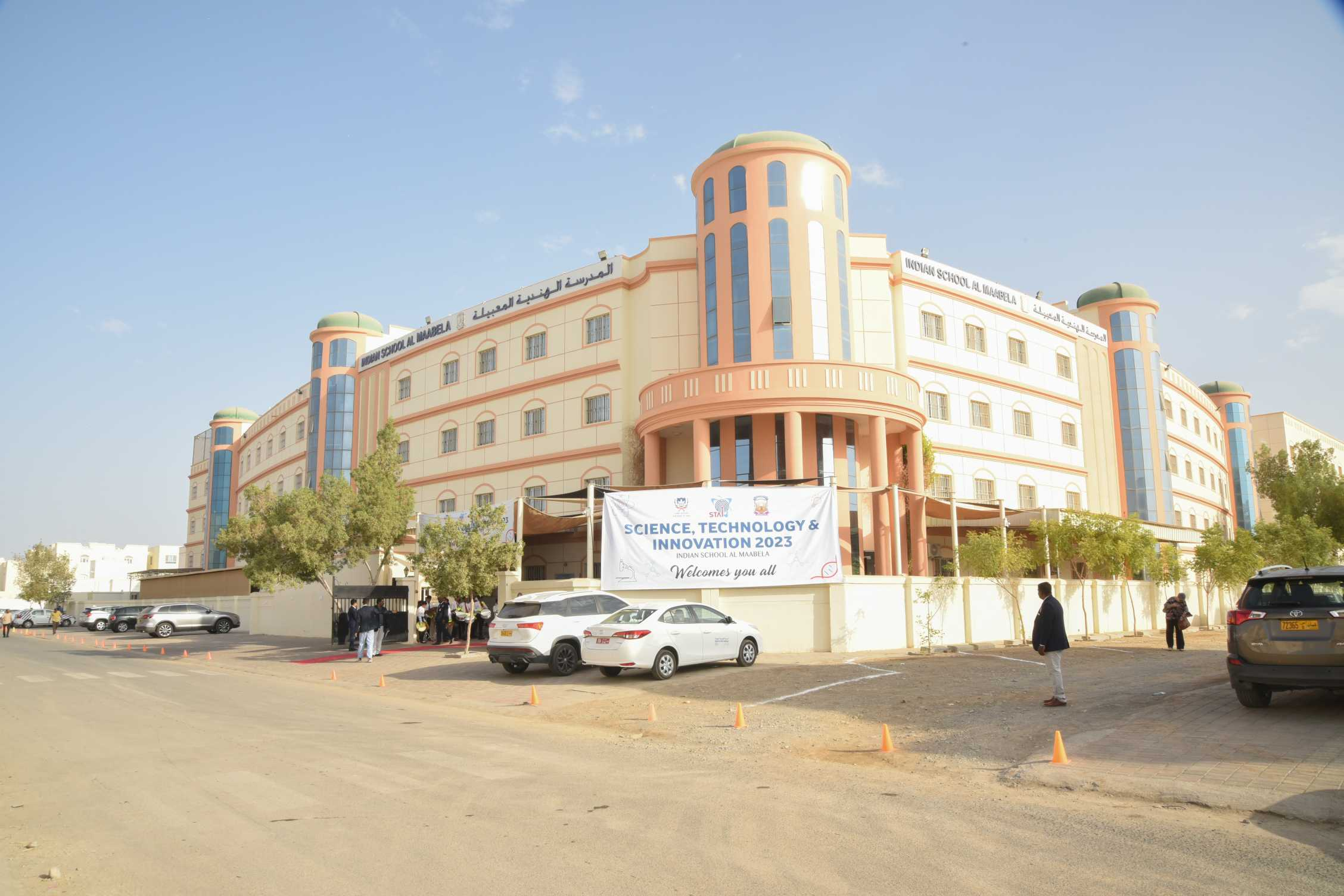
Indian School Al Maabela

1. Indian School Al Maabela in Al-Maabela
2. Indian School Al Wadi Al Kabir in Wadi Kabir
3. Indian School Buraimi in Al-Buraimi
4. Indian School Bousher in Bousher
5. Indian School Darsait in Darsait
6. Indian School Duqm in Duqm
7. Indian School Ghubra in Al-Ghubra
8. Indian School Ibra in Ibra
9. Indian School Ibri in Ibri
10. Indian School Jalan in Jalan Bani Bu Ali
11. Indian School Khasab in Khasab
12. Indian School Masirah in Masirah
13. Indian School Muladha in Muladha
14. Indian School Muscat in Muscat
15. Indian School Nizwa in Nizwa
16. Indian School Rustaq in Rustaq
17. Indian School Saham in Saham
18. Indian School Salalah in Salalah
19. Indian School Seeb in Seeb
20. Indian School Sohar in Sohar
21. Indian School Sur in Sur
22. Indian School Thumrait in Thumrait

== See also ==
- Hinduism in Oman
