= Indian school =

Indian school or Indian School may refer to:

== 19th-century schools in North America ==
- American Indian boarding schools, boarding schools established in the United States during the late 19th century to educate Native American youths according to Euro-American standards
- Canadian Indian residential school system, a system in Canada similar to the Indian school system in the U.S. during the 19th and 20th centuries

== Schools for expatriate Indians ==
- Indian School, Al-Ghubra, an international school in Al-Ghubra, Oman
- Indian School, Al Wadi Al Kabir, an international school in Oman
- Indian School, Bahrain, one of the largest expatriate schools in the Persian Gulf region
- Indian School, Darsait, an international school in Darsait, Oman
- Indian School, Muscat, an international school in Muscat, Oman
- Indian School, Ras al-Khaimah, an international school in the United Arab Emirates
- Indian School, Salalah, a school in Oman
- Indian School, Sohar, a school managed by Indian embassy in Oman

== Other uses ==
- Indian School (TV series), a BBC documentary series set in Pune, India

== See also ==
- Native School (disambiguation)
- Schools in India
