= Ajay Sastry =

Indian film director (1974–2024)

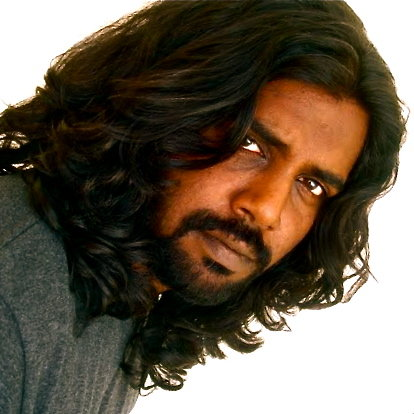
- Sastry in 2010
- Born: 26 July 1974; Hyderabad, Andhra Pradesh, India
- Died: 2 August 2024 (aged 50)
- Occupation(s): Film director, screenwriter

Ajay Sastry (26 July 1974 – 2 August 2024) was an Indian film director and writer who directed his maiden film called Nenu Meeku Telusa (2008).

== Life and career ==
His journey started with a short film called "12" (Baarah) that was produced by KAD Movies and Rana Daggubati. In the past, he played the role of associate director and screenplay writer for movies such as Rakhi and Danger.

Ajay was also the lead singer of rock bands like "Alter Egoz" and "Jekyll and Hyde".

He shifted to being an ad and film-maker.

He directed his maiden film called Nenu Meeku Telusa starring Manchu Manoj, Sneha Ullal and Riya Sen. Though the film did not perform well, the film was noted for being different.

Sastry died on 2 August 2024, at the age of 50.

== Filmography ==
- Nenu Meeku Telusa? (2008)
