= Telusa =

Telusa may refer to:

- Telusa Veainu (born 1990), New Zealand rugby union player
- Nenu Meeku Telusa?, film
