= Filipinos in Oman =

Total population
- c. 40,000 (2011)

Languages
- Tagalog or other languages of the Philippines, English and Arabic

Religion
- Roman Catholicism or other Christian denominations, Islam

Related ethnic groups
- Filipino people, Overseas Filipinos

Filipinos in Oman are either migrants or descendants of the Philippines living in Oman. As of 2011, there are between 40,000 and 46,000 of these Filipinos in Oman. A large destination for Overseas Filipino workers (OFWs), Oman was the only Middle Eastern nation included on the Philippine Overseas Employment Administration's list of nations safe for OFWs. The country still holds the title up to this day.

== Economy and employment ==
Oman is the tenth largest destination for Filipino domestic workers hired or rehired from 2006–2011, but Filipinos are also employed in the health care industry as physicians and nurses, or as sales associates and cosmetologists.

Oman is a source of remittances sent back to the Philippines, with roughly $66.5 million USD sent back in 2011 and $55.8 million USD officially sent back in 2010. Five Filipino banks have correspondent accounts with banks in Oman to allow for remittance transfers.

There is also a Filipino Workers Resource Center (FWRC) in Oman that seeks to help overseas Filipino workers with employment issues. Due to migrant worker protection laws, Filipino workers generally face fewer abuses in Oman than in other Middle Eastern countries. However, the FWRC frequently handles cases in which Filipino workers flee from neighboring countries, such as the United Arab Emirates, into Oman seeking assistance.

== Society and culture ==
In 2012, the Philippine Embassy in Oman opened the Sentro Rizal Cultural Center and Library in Muscat to provide cultural resources for Filipinos living abroad as well as other residents of Oman. 2011-2013 Philippine Ambassador to Oman Joselito A. Jimeno stated that "the aim of the library is really for children of overseas Filipinos to reconnect with our history and politics and literature."

Philippine School Sultanate of Oman (PSSO), commonly known as Philippine School Muscat, is a private international school in the Al-Khuwair district of Muscat that serves the Overseas Filipino community. The school was established in 1989 and opened in 1990. It has over 750 students from pre-school level to fourth year high school but has been following the K-12 program since the school year 2012-2013, permanently shifting in 2017. While the majority of the students are overseas Filipinos, other foreign national students attend the school as well. The school is accredited by the Philippine Department of Education. After graduation in high school, many students go home to the Philippines and enroll to schools like University of the Philippines, University of Santo Tomas and other universities and colleges in the Philippines to complete their post-secondary education.

Philippine holidays such as Independence Day and Bonifacio Day, commemorating the Philippine Declaration of Independence and Filipino nationalist Andrés Bonifacio respectively, are celebrated in Oman.
