= Aryan (2006 film) =

2006 Indian sports drama film

- Theatrical release poster
- Directed by: Abhishek Kapoor
- Written by: Sayan Sen; Abhishek Kapoor
- Produced by: Poonam Khubani; Vipin Anand; Manisha Israni
- Starring: Sohail Khan; Sneha Ullal; Inder Kumar; Puneet Issar
- Cinematography: Neelaabh Kaul
- Edited by: Shakthi Hasilja; Renjith B. Vattakattu
- Music by: Songs: Anand Raaj Anand; Score: Ranjit Barot
- Production companies: K Factor Entertainment Pvt. Ltd. Telebrands India
- Distributed by: Eros International
- Release date: 15 December 2006
- Country: India
- Language: Hindi

Aryan: Unbreakable is a 2006 Indian Hindi-language sports drama film written and directed by debutante Abhishek Kapoor and produced by Poonam Khubani, Manisha Israni and Vipin Anand. The film stars Sohail Khan and Sneha Ullal with Puneet Issar, Satish Shah, Supriya Karnik and Inder Kumar in supporting roles.

== Plot ==
Aryan, a decorated college boxer training under Coach Ranveer Singh Bagga, is driven by a singular ambition: the national championship. Supported by his devoted girlfriend, Neha, his path seems set until a series of life-altering events forces him to hang up his gloves. He transitions into a quiet life as a husband, father, and sports commentator, but stability remains elusive.

His past returns to haunt him when his former training partner, Ranjeet, who was expelled for steroid use, falsely accuses Aryan of being the whistleblower. This grudge spirals into a violent confrontation that costs Aryan his career. The mounting pressure and his own volatile temper eventually poison his personal life; consumed by baseless jealousy regarding Neha's boss, Aryan alienates both his wife and his mentor.

Hit by rock bottom and desperate to reclaim his dignity, Aryan agrees to return to the ring. The stakes peak at the national championship, where Ranjeet awaits him, fueled by a desire for vengeance. The final match is brutal, leaving Aryan on the brink of a physical and emotional collapse.

Just as Ranjeet nears victory, Neha returns to the sidelines, her presence offering the forgiveness and motivation Aryan needs to persevere. Re-energized by her support, Aryan stages a dramatic comeback to defeat Ranjeet, finally securing the national title and successfully mending the broken bonds with his family.

== Cast ==
- Sohail Khan as Aryan Verma
- Sneha Ullal as Neha Verma
- Inder Kumar as Ranjeet Singh
- Puneet Issar as Ranveer Singh Bagga (Aryan's coach)
- Farida Jalal as Mrs. Braganza (Aryan's neighbour)
- Satish Shah as Kiran (Neha's father)
- Supriya Karnik as Devika (Neha's mother)
- Kapil Dev as himself (cameo appearance)
- Ahsaas Channa as Ranveer Verma (Aryan's son)
- Fardeen Khan as Sameer (cameo appearance)
- Suved Lohia as Jaideep Malhotra (Aryan's friend)

== Soundtrack ==
Aryan

Soundtrack album by Anand Raaj Anand
- Released: 9 February 2006
- Genre: Feature film soundtrack
- Label: T-Series

Anand Raaj Anand composed the soundtrack and was also the lyricist. According to Box Office India, with around 11,00,000 units sold, this film's soundtrack album was the thirteenth highest-selling of the year.

| Title | Singer(s) |
|---|---|
| "Ek Look Ek Look Pyar" | Poonam Khubani |
| "Chunna Hai Asman Ko" | Ranjit Barot |
| "Sajan Ghar Aana Tha" | Sonu Nigam, Shreya Ghoshal |
| "Its Beautiful Day" | Shreya Ghoshal, Hamza Faruqui |
| "Lamha Lamha" | Anand Raj Anand |
| "Rab Ne Mere" | Kunal Ganjawala, Shreya Ghoshal |
| "Teri Te Me" | Pamela Jain, Anand Raj Anand |

== Reception ==
Taran Adarsh of Bollywood Hungama gave the film 1.5 out of 5, writing stars, "On the whole, ARYAN is a well-made film that combines style and substance beautifully. Unfortunately, the box-office will sing a different tune altogether! Reasons: [i] Not-too-attractive face-value, [ii] Delayed release and [iii] Oppositions in Kabul Express this week and Bhagam Bhag next week. To sum up, despite strong merits, ARYAN will be knocked down in the box-office ring!" Priyanka Jain of Rediff.com gave a negative review, stating, "Seriously, I too don't understand why anyone would make a film like this."
