= Indian School, Al Wadi Al Kabir =

Coordinates: 23.58139°N 58.56349°E

ISWK
- Muscat; Oman

Information
- Type: Co-educational
- Motto: Tamaso Ma Jyotirgamaya (From darkness to light)
- Established: 1978
- School district: Al Wadi Al Kabir
- Principal: D. N. Rao
- Grades: Kindergarten to Grade 12
- Enrollment: 5800+
- Campus size: 2 acres (0.81 ha)
- Colors: Grey, white and dark blue
- Affiliation: Central Board of Secondary Education, India
- Website: www.iswkoman.com

Indian School Al Wadi Al Kabir (ISWK) was founded in 1941 as a Gujarati Medium School for the children of the business community members and was called Seth Khimji Ramdas Arya Kelavani Mandal Muttrah School functioning from a building in close proximity to Muttrah souq till 1989 when it was shifted a temporary location in Darsait and finally to Al Wadi Al Kabir. Mr. Leo Lobo was the school's principal from 1991 to spring 2008. Mr. P.N. Ashok succeeded him as the principal until his resignation in 2012. The current principal of ISWK is Mr. D. N. Rao.

== History and background ==
In 1941, the institute was founded as a Gujarati medium school for Gujarati business communities. The school was renamed Indian School Mutrah with English as the primary medium of instruction in 1987.

In 1992, it was upgraded to secondary level. An application for a composite affiliation was made in the academic year 1992–93. The rented premises of the school and its plans for a school building were inspected in November 1992 and the school was granted composite affiliation until Grade X for 1993 (see CBSE letter reference number CBSE/Aff/91/61304, dated 22-12-1992). The first batch of Class X students appeared at the AISS Examination of the CBSE in March 1996. It was upgraded to Senior Secondary School in 1999 and the first batch of Class XII students appeared at the Board examination in 2001.

The current school building was constructed in 1992–93 and occupied in the beginning of the following academic year. As it is located in an area called Al Wadi Al Kabir, Indian School Muttrah as it was called from 1987, was renamed Indian School Al Wadi Al Kabir as per the instructions of the Directorate of the Ministry of Education. This building has 4 science laboratories, 3 IT laboratories, two libraries, an art room, a dance room, 2 music rooms, a multi-purpose hall with facilities for various programmes and indoor games, and space for outdoor games.

By the time the school moved to the new premises in Wadi Kabir, the number enrolled had increased and an afternoon shift was introduced on the same premises. However, because the two-shift system was very inconvenient to parents and students, it was abolished and pre-primary and some of the primary classes were shifted to rented premises. At the same time plans were being prepared for a new building in Wadi Kabir, which was ready in July 2000. It houses Kindergarten and Classes I to V. The primary grounds have been extended to accommodate larger crowds for events. In 2008, two more floors were added to the senior school. By 2015-16, every classroom was equipped with smart boards and projectors and in December 2015, construction was started in the senior school to add more class rooms. Pre-primary classes had already been housed in premises very close to the building in 1997. In 2018, elevators were installed in every floor for easy movement of students and teachers. The principal of the school was Mr.Lobo from 1990 to 2008 the current principal joined Mr D.N. Rao in 2012.

In November 2024, Indian School Al Wadi Al Kabir (ISWK) established its first international partnership with StockGro, an Indian financial education platform. This collaboration aims to enhance financial literacy among students through various initiatives, including a virtual stock market competition designed to educate participants about stock trading and investment strategies.

== Academics ==
ISWK is a public, co-educational day school that is under the Central Board of Secondary Education of India. The school offers complete educational services starting from Kindergarten through to 12th-grade senior school and follows the CBSE syllabus.

As of 2026, Students of class 11th and 12th can choose from three different groups, each with specific compulsory and elective subjects. English Core remains a compulsory subject, irrespective of the groups.

Science (Group 1) includes compulsory subjects like Physics and Chemistry, with two electives from a list of options which includes Mathematics, Computer Science, Biology, Economics, Engineering Graphics, Informatics Practices, Psychology, and Physical Education.

Commerce (Group 2) has compulsory subjects Accountancy and Business Studies, and two electives among the options of Economics, Mathematics, Informatics Practices, Marketing, and Entrepreneurship.

Humanities (Group 3) is also available, with Psychology as the only complusory subject and any 4 electives, which include Business Studies, Marketing, Physical Education, Sociology, Entrepreneurship, Economics, Informatics Practices and Biology.

A minimum of 20 students must opt for a subject combination for it to be offered.

The school also offers languages other than English (which is the first language for every student) and Hindi, such as French, Malayalam, Sanskrit, Tamil and Arabic. Until recently, the second language (Malayalam, French and Hindi) was taught till the 10th, whereas the third language (Malayalam, Sanskrit, Hindi and Arabic) was taught from 6th to 8th.

Since 2023-2024, 1st graders have been allowed to pick between French, Hindi, Malayalam and Tamil. Currently from 6th onwards, options for 3rd language include: Arabic, Sanskrit, Hindi, French, Tamil and Malayalam, and for 2nd language include: Arabic, Hindi, French, Tamil and Malayalam. English remains the compulsory first language for every student.

In 2015, the school won the junior and senior quiz categories at the prestigious Times Of Oman Inter-School Quiz, becoming the first school in Oman to do so.

The school also gives training to students in extra co-curricular activities like dance, football, volleyball, tennis, badminton, musical instruments. The school started giving swimming training to students in 2019. In 2023 it became the first school in Oman to give scholarships to the meritorious students.

The school has categorised the students into four houses: Vivekananda (yellow), Tagore (blue), Akbar (green) and Ashoka (red).

== Faculty ==
To keep the faculty in touch with developments in the field of education, in-house workshops are conducted, and in-service workshops by experts in different subjects are also conducted. Some of these that have been held in the past few years were in Hindi, Mathematics and Social Studies at the Middle and the Secondary level, in Mathematics and Environmental Studies for Primary teachers and on Activity-based approach for Kindergarten. Objective-based teaching and evaluation, Value Education in classroom are a few other topics.

== Alumni ==
Some of the notable alumni of the school are:

- Sarah-Jane Dias, Miss India 2007
- Manjari Babu, Indian playback singer
- Sneha Ullal, Bollywood actress
