= Nilakanta (film) =

2026 Indian film by Rakesh Madhavan

- Theatrical release poster
- Directed by: Rakesh Madhavan
- Produced by: Marlapalli Srinivasulu; D. Venugopal
- Starring: Master Mahendran; Yashna Muthuluri; Anil Inamadugu
- Cinematography: Sravan G. Kumar
- Edited by: Sravan G. Kumar
- Music by: Mark Prashanth
- Production company: LS Productions
- Distributed by: Global Cinemas
- Release date: 2 January 2026
- Country: India
- Language: Telugu

Nilakanta: The Essence of Karma is a 2026 Indian Telugu-language action drama film written and directed by Rakesh Madhavan. The film stars Master Mahendran in the titular role, with Yashna Muthuluri, Neha Pathan, Sneha Ullal, Subhalekha Sudhakar, Ramki, and Babloo Prithiveeraj in supporting roles. It was produced by Marlapalli Srinivasulu and D. Venugopal under the banners LS Productions and Global Cinemas. The film was theatrically released on 2 January 2026.

== Cast ==
- Master Mahendran as Nilakanta
- Yashna Muthuluri as Seetha
- Neha Pathan
- Anil Inamadugu
- Sneha Ullal
- Subhalekha Sudhakar
- Ramki
- Babloo Prithiveeraj
- Surabhi Prabhavathi
- Kancharapalem Raju

== Production ==
The film written and directed by Rakesh Madhavan. It was produced by Marlapalli Srinivasulu and D. Venugopal under the banners LS Productions and Global Cinemas, with Anil Inamadugu serving as executive producer. The music is composed by Mark Prashanth, and cinematography is by Sravan G. Kumar.

== Soundtrack ==
No.	Title	Lyrics	Singer(s)
1	Ee Prema	Anil Inamadugu	Haricharan
2	Jara Saiga Chesi	Guduru Krishna	Geetha Madhuri
3	Kaalam Edho	Anil Inamadugu	Vaikom Vijayalakshmi
4	Kabaddi Theme	Anil Inamadugu	Venky, Vinay, Maruthi, Gautham
5	Vellake Vellake Sakhiya	Anil Inamadugu	Karthik, Jayasri Pallem
6	Jathara Theme	Anil Inamadugu	Venky, Vinay, Maruthi, Gautham
7	Nilakanta Title Track	Anil Inamadugu	Mark Prashanth
8	Daatipora	Anil Inamadugu	Vaikom Vijayalakshmi

== Reception ==
The Hans India critic wrote that "A solid rural drama that strikes the right chord to begin the new year on a winning note." rated three out of five stars.

Times Now critic stated that "Overall, the movie 'Neelakantha' is a rural emotional sports drama with good commercial elements! 'Neelakantha' is a movie that gives a good break to Mahendran as an actor and hero".

Zee News wrote that " 'Neelkantha'.. Commercial elements with sports content movie.. ".
