= 2024 Muscat mosque shooting =

Mass shooting in Muscat, Oman

- Part of the persecution of Shias by the Islamic State
- Location: Wadi Kabir, Muscat, Oman
- Date: 15 July 2024
- Target: Pakistani Shia worshippers at the Imam Ali mosque
- Attack type: Mass shooting
- Weapons: Steyr AUG, Heckler & Koch G3
- Deaths: 9 (including 3 perpetrators)
- Injuries: 28
- Perpetrator: Islamic State
- Motive: Anti-Shi'ism

On 15 July 2024, six people, including a policeman, were killed and 28 others were injured in a mass shooting near and in a Shia Muslim mosque in Oman's capital, Muscat. The Islamic State claimed responsibility for the attack.

== Background ==
Oman is predominantly Muslim, with most following the Sunni and Ibadi sects, and Shi'ism accounting for about 5% of the country's population.

The Islamic State has had a history of anti-Shia sentiment, including considerable violence against Shi'ites during the Syrian Civil War and the War in Iraq. However, they had never claimed responsibility for an attack in Oman prior to the shooting.

== Attack ==
The shooting occurred as Shi'ite worshippers were marking the eve of Ashura at the Imam Ali mosque frequently attended by South Asian expatriates in the Wadi Kabir area of Muscat. Gunmen reportedly opened fire from a building near the mosque before entering the facility itself in the evening and opening fire, with some worshippers taken hostage before being rescued by security forces. A witness told the Times of Oman that the attack lasted for about an hour and a half, while the Pakistani ambassador said he had taken calls from Pakistani worshippers who were in the mosque providing information that was used by Omani security forces in their response.

The three attackers were killed by the security forces. Six other people died in the attack, including a police officer. Pakistan said four of its nationals were killed in the attack, while the local police reported that 28 others were injured. The Indian embassy in Oman said that one Indian national was killed and another injured in the attack. A state of emergency was declared in Wadi Kabir.

== Aftermath ==
The remains of the Pakistani fatalities were repatriated by the Pakistani government on 19 July aboard Pakistan International Airlines flights towards Islamabad and Lahore for burial in their places of origin.

== Perpetrators ==
The Islamic State subsequently claimed responsibility for the attack and published a picture of the gunmen raising the group's flag on its Amaq News Agency. The gunmen were all citizens of Oman, and were brothers, according to the police.

== Reactions ==
Pakistani Prime Minister Shehbaz Sharif expressed sadness over the attack and offered his government's help in the investigation. The Pakistani embassy in Oman called on all its nationals in the country to cooperate with Omani authorities. The US embassy in Oman issued a security alert and cancelled all visa appointments scheduled on 16 July. The Iranian Foreign Ministry stated it stood "in solidarity with Oman against such attempts to sow discord." The UAE expressed its "strong condemnation of these criminal acts and its permanent rejection of all forms of violence.” Bahrain's foreign ministry said that the shooting was a "heinous attack that goes against all religious and moral values and aims to destabilise the security and stability of Oman". Saudi Arabia praised the efficiency of the Omani reaction to the shooting. The secretary general of the Gulf Cooperation Council (GCC), Jasem Al Budaiwi, affirmed the support of the council for Oman, which is a member state.

News outlets have noted the rarity of the attack in Oman, a relatively stable Gulf nation.
