= India–Oman relations =

- India: Oman

Diplomatic mission
- Embassy of India, Muscat: Embassy of Oman, New Delhi

Envoy
- Indian Ambassador to Oman Prashant Pise: Omani Ambassador to India Issa Saleh Abdullah Alshibani

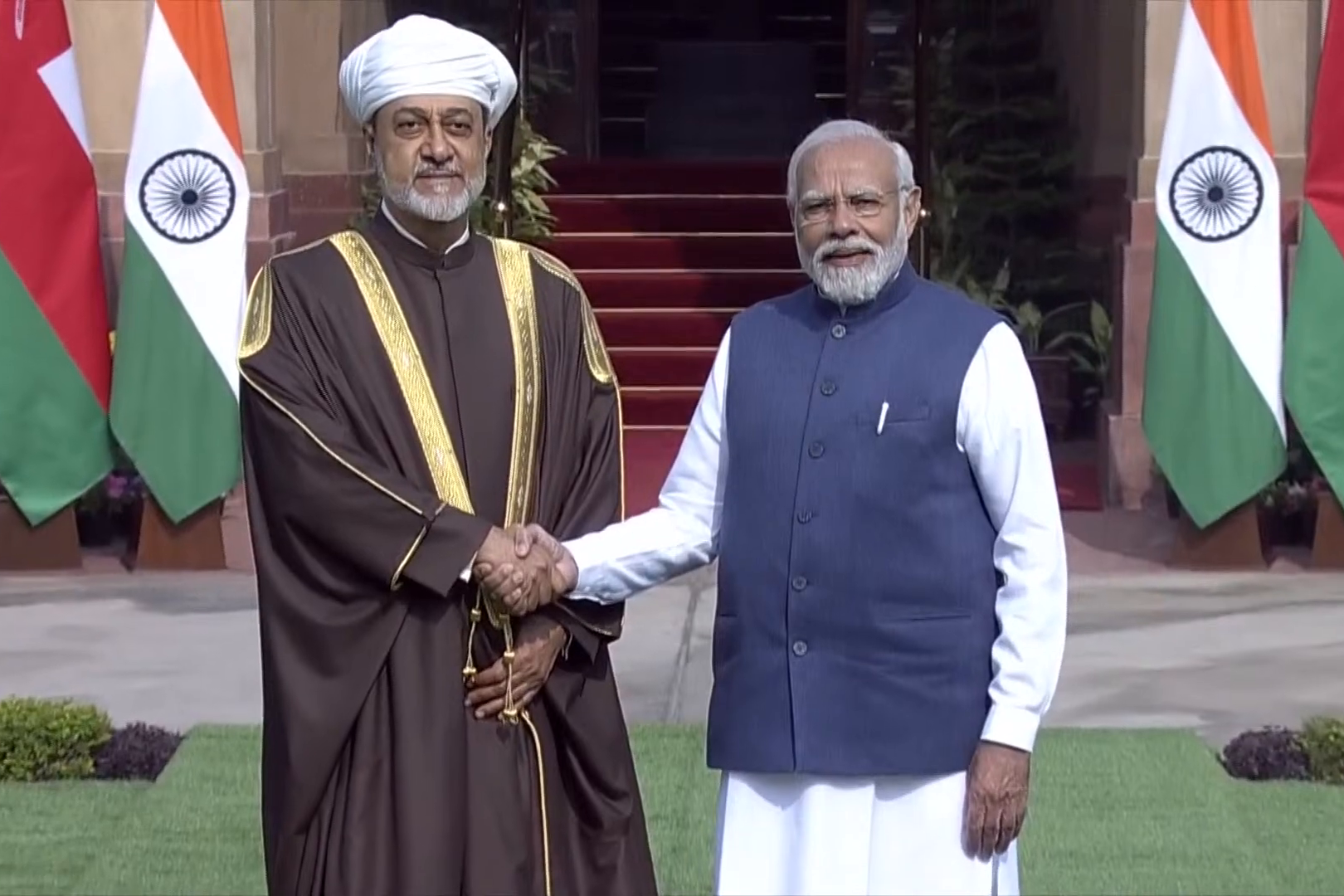
Prime Minister of India, Narendra Modi shakes hands with the Sultan Of Oman, Haitham bin Tariq in December 2023

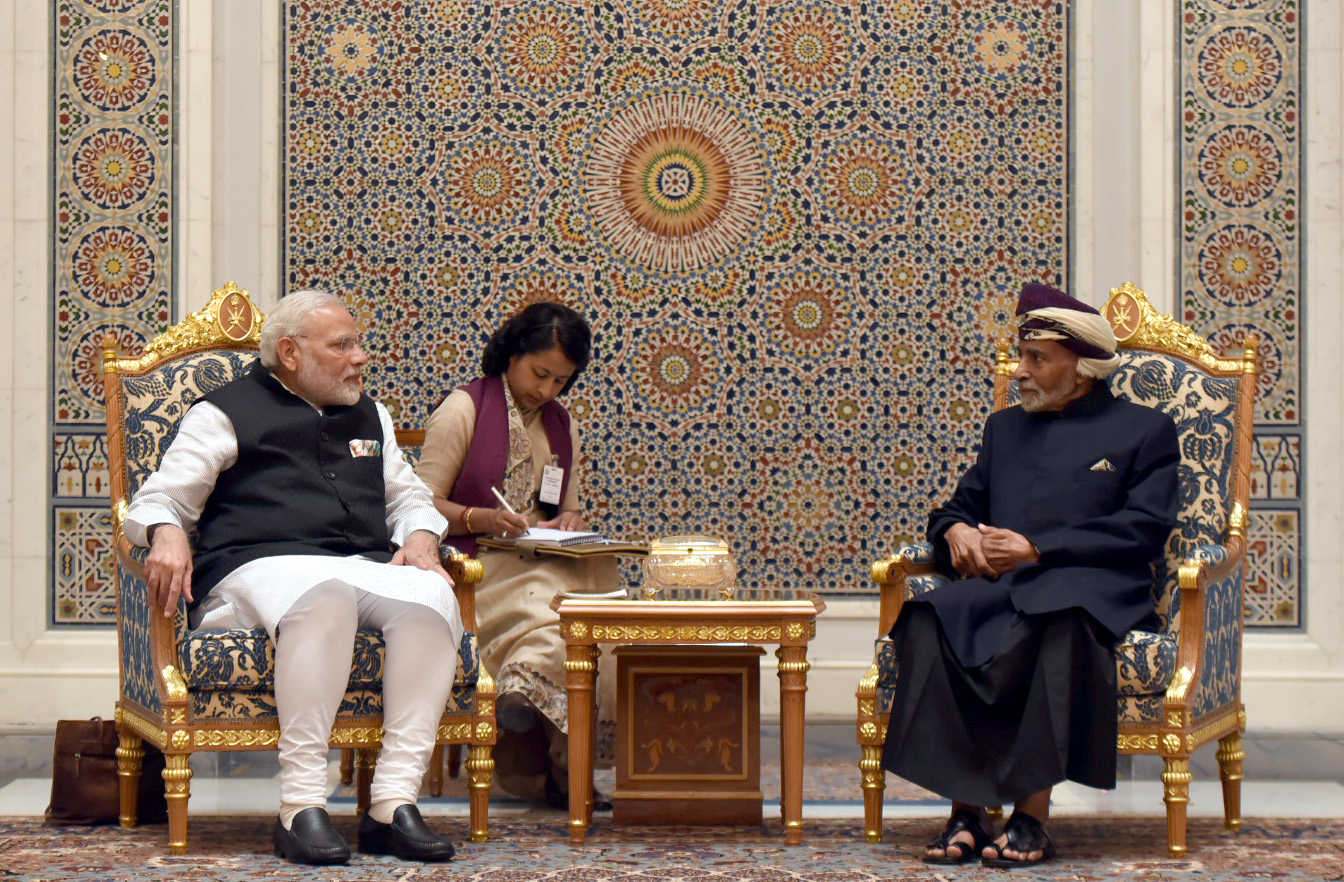
Prime Minister Narendra Modi meeting with Sultan Qaboos bin Said Al Said at Bait Al Baraka, Muscat in 2018.

India–Oman relations are foreign relations between the Republic of India and the Sultanate of Oman. India has an embassy in Muscat, Oman. During British rule in India, Bombay presidency controlled Oman for the British Empire. An Indian consulate was opened in Muscat in February 1955 which was upgraded to a consulate general in 1960 and later into a full-fledged embassy in 1971. The first ambassador of India arrived in Muscat in 1973. Oman established its embassy in New Delhi in 1972 and a consulate general in Mumbai in 1976. India and Oman have had trade and people-to-people ties for several millennia. Oman is home to a large Indian expatriate community and for Oman, India is an important trading partner. Politically, Oman has been supportive of India's bid for permanent membership of the United Nations Security Council.

== History ==
Trade between India and Oman has a history of several millenniums and archaeological excavations in Oman have unearthed evidence to show Indo-Oman trade in the during the Classical Age dated to circa third century BCE. Later, Oman had links with the Indians through Gujarat, and with Tamilakam along the Malabar Coast.

In August 1957, during one of the Lok Sabha debates, the then Prime Minister of India Jawaharlal Nehru, replying to a question asked on British Armed Forces interference in Oman said, "We have received indirectly a message purporting to come from some representatives of the Imam of Oman. The Government of India have viewed with concern the news of the military action which has taken place in Oman...have expressed to the United Kingdom Government the concern and conveyed to them public feelings in India, in regard to this action."

The Sultanate of Oman had sovereignty over the Gwadar Port in present day Pakistan till 1958 when in September of that year, Pakistan paid £3 million (some say half that sum) to buy the enclave, ending over 200 years of Omani control, before which it was a part of erstwhile India.

== Expatriate community ==
Oman has over five hundred thousand Indian nationals living there making them the largest expatriate community in Oman. They annually remit US$780 million to India. India is a major destination for Omani students pursuing higher studies and in recent years there have been increasing numbers of medical tourists coming into the country from Oman. Oman has also been trying to promote itself as a tourist destination in India. The Sultanate of Oman has recorded over 200% growth in Indian tourists arrivals with 355,459 travellers visited the country in 2022, compared to 106,042 travellers in 2021, making India the second highest source market for Oman when the country witnessed a massive 348 percent jump in tourists in 2022 compared to 2021.

== Economic relations ==
In 2010, bilateral trade between India and Oman stood at $4.5 billion. India was Oman's second largest destination for its non-oil exports and its fourth largest source for imports. Indian and Omani firms have undertaken joint ventures in a wide range of sectors including fertilisers, pharmaceuticals, energy and engineering. The Oman-India Fertiliser Company (OMIFCO) plant at Sur in Oman and the Bharat-Oman Oil Refinery at Bina have been set up as joint ventures between Indian public sector companies and Oman Oil Company.

In 2024–25, India exported $4.06 billion worth of goods to Oman, while imports from Oman amounted to $6.5 billion.

=== Free trade agreement ===
The India–Oman Comprehensive Economic Partnership Agreement (CEPA) is a bilateral free trade agreement signed on 18 December 2025 in Muscat by India’s Minister of Commerce and Industry Piyush Goyal and Oman’s Minister of Commerce, Industry and Investment Promotion Qais bin Mohammed Al Yousef; under the agreement, Oman granted India duty-free access on 98.08% of its tariff lines, covering about 99% of Indian exports, while India offered liberalised tariffs on 77.79% of its tariff lines, covering nearly 95% of imports from Oman, along with commitments on services and worker mobility aimed at boosting bilateral trade and investment. The agreement marked Oman’s first bilateral trade agreement with any country since its free trade agreement with the United States in 2006, and represented India’s second such agreement with a member state of the Gulf Cooperation Council (GCC).

Indian PM Narendra Modi said the agreement would strengthen the India–Oman partnership in the 21st century by renewing confidence and momentum, describing it as a forward-looking framework intended to boost trade, enhance investment trust, and create new opportunities across sectors.

=== Gas pipeline ===
India has been considering the construction of a 1,100-km-long underwater natural gas pipeline from Oman. Called the South Asia Gas Enterprise (SAGE), it will act as an alternative to the Iran–Pakistan–India pipeline. The project has been slow in materialising although it was first mooted in 1985.

== Defence co-operation ==
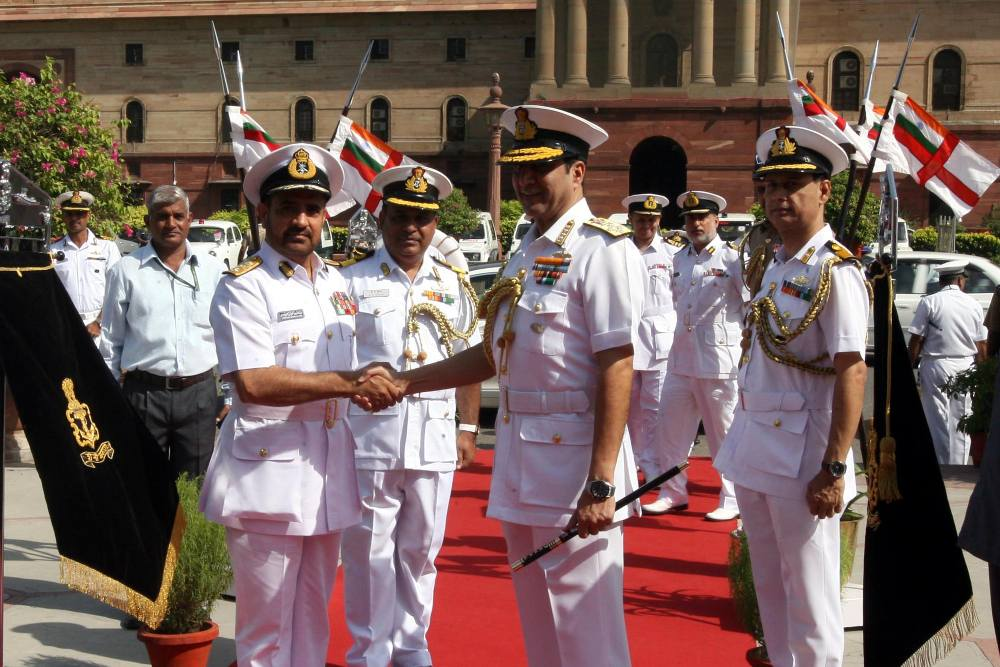
Indian Adm. Robin Dhowan receiving Omani Rear Admiral Abdullah Bin Khasim Bin Abdullah Al Raisi at South Block, New Delhi; 7 September 2015

Oman is the first Gulf nation to have formalised defence relations with India. Both countries conducted joint military exercises in 2006 and subsequently signed a defense agreement. Following Prime Minister Manmohan Singh's visit to Oman in 2008, defence co-operation between the two countries was further stepped up. The Indian Navy has berthing rights in Oman, and has been utilising Oman's ports as bases for conducting anti-piracy operations in the Gulf of Aden. The Indian Air Force has also been holding biannual joint exercises with the Royal Air Force of Oman since 2009. Oman has approached India in order to fence along the Oman-Yemen border in order to protect the nation from growing unrest in Yemen. The standard-issue rifle of the Royal Army of Oman is India's INSAS rifle. India has a listening post at Ras al Hadd. and berthing rights for the Indian Navy at Mascat naval base. Indian Navy’s indigenously designed and constructed guided missile destroyer INS Visakhapatnam arrived at Port Sultan Qaboos, Muscat on 30 July 2023 for a three-day port call, during which various naval cooperation events, such as students visiting INS Visakhapatnam, musical band performances by Indian Navy and sporting and cultural programmes marked the interaction between Indian Navy and Royal Navy of Oman, which culminated with a Maritime Partnership Exercise (MPX) on 3 August 2023.

On 15th of July 2024, an oil tanker MV Prestige Falcon capsized 25 nautical miles off the coast of Oman with a crew of 13 Indians and 3 Sri Lankan nationals. Indian Navy's INS Teg which was on operational deployment nearby was ordered to assist in the search and rescue operations along with the Royal Navy of Oman and was also assisted by one of India's Long Range Maritime Reconnaissance aircraft P8I. As of 18th July, the body of one Indian national was recovered and 8 Indian crew members were rescued. This operation was undergoing with the close support of the Omani authorities as well as in coordination with the Indian Embassy in Oman.

=== Naseem al-Bahr ===
Naseem al-Bahr (Arabic word for Sea Breeze) is a bilateral maritime exercise between India and Oman. The exercise was first held in 1993. The last exercise was conducted from 19 to 24 November 2022 off coast of Oman and had three phases: harbour phase, sea phase and debrief. Year 2022 marked 30 years of IN-RNO bilateral exercises. The next edition of Naseem al-Bahr is scheduled in 2024.

=== Duqm ===
In February 2018, India announced that it had secured access to the facilities at Duqm for the Indian Air Force and the Indian Navy. Duqm had previously served as a port for the INS Mumbai.

== See also ==
- Indians in Oman
