= Philippine School Sultanate of Oman =

Location
- Muscat; Oman; 23.585746°N 58.4456348°E

Information
- Type: Private
- Established: 1989
- School board: Board of Trustees of the Philippine School in Oman
- School district: Al-Khuwair
- Chairman: Mr.Luisito B. Layon
- Principal: Mr. Michael B. Joves
- Grades: Preschool-Grade 6 (1990–1992), Preschool-fourth year high school (1992–2015), K-12 (2012-onwards; full transition in 2017)
- Colors: Yellow and Navy Blue
- Song: Hail PS, Hail
- Team name: Patriots
- Newspaper: The PaceSetter
- Website: pso.edu.om

The Philippine School Sultanate of Oman (also known as Philippine School Muscat), established in 1989, is a private school in the Persian Gulf region. Located in the city of Muscat, Oman, the school caters to the Filipino community as well as foreigners.

== History ==
=== Foundation (1989) ===
During the 1980s decade, the only Arab nation to have an established Filipino community school was the Kingdom of Saudi Arabia; the biggest cities such as Riyadh and Jeddah having Filipino schools of their own. Meanwhile, in the Sultanate of Oman, Filipino overseas workers having families living with them in the same country send their children to private international schools in the Sultanate such as but not limited to Pakistani School, Sri Lankan School, Indian School, American British Academy, and British School Muscat.

In 1989, the Filipino Overseas Workers in the Sultanate established plans for a Filipino community school in the country, in cooperation with the Philippine government agencies Overseas Workers Welfare Administration (OWWA) and the Department of Labor and Employment (DOLE). They received the support of the Philippine Honorary Consul General his Excellency Essa bin Mohammed Al Zedjali, and the school was founded as Philippine Community School.

=== Infancy years (1990-1991) ===
The institution was inaugurated on February 2, 1990 under the name Philippine Community School at a leased residential villa (Villa no. 1324) at Way 317 of Wuttayah Street in the Al Wattayah district. It opened fifteen days later with 38 students handled by volunteer teachers. A teacher named Elenita Fernandez arrived in June of that year to take up post as the school's first principal. With the arrival of the institution's first elementary teachers: Isabelita Malong, Carmelita de Jesus, and Fe Edithaldine Vendiola, from the Philippines before the end of 1990, the school began offering a separate preschool and elementary level.

After producing its first graduates in the form of preparatory pupils, all handled by Fernandez, followed by the arrival of the first preschool teacher Mrs. Rosario Ballesteros in September 1991, the school was recognized as a learning institution by the then Ministry of Education and Youth. It produced the first set of grade six graduates at the end of academic year 1990-1991.

=== Relocation (1992-1996) ===
Throughout the early 1990s, the school was relocated three times in three different districts. Its second site was at Dauhat Al Adab Street in al-Khuwair for the school year 1992-1993, where it began offering the high school level, with six first year high school (present-day Grade 7) students, handled by another trio of teachers who served as the school's first secondary level teachers: Dionisio Viloria, Enrique Pontillas, and Erlinda Valientes, all of whom arrived from the Philippines that year with a new elementary teacher, Annette Imperial, in their company. Before the end of the school year, a graduation song, titled as "Hail PS, Hail", was composed by the year's graduating sixth graders, wherein it would officially become the school's alma mater song in 1994.

With the residential area of al-Khuwair deemed unsafe for the growing student population, the school relocated to al-Farahidi street in the district of Ruwi, where it would be based from 1993 until 1995. Four teachers joined the teaching force for the new school year.

After consistently meeting the prescribed standards of instruction and complying with the regulations set by the Department of Education, Culture, and Sports (DECS) in the Philippines, as well as adhering to the Ministry of Education’s policies in Oman, the school gained its Government Recognition (No. 02, s. 1995) on 31 January 1995, allowing it to offer all courses of basic education. The recognition also saw its official renaming to PHILIPPINE SCHOOL - SULTANATE OF OMAN (PSSO), while also being recognized as Philippine School Muscat (PSM).

The school has since been operating in accordance with the laws of the Republic of the Philippines, particularly along organization, administration, and supervision for private educational institution; likewise, with the Sultanate's Ministerial Decree No. 4/2006. At the end of school years 1994-1995 and 1995-1996, nineteen elementary pupils and the first batch of six high school students graduated.

By early 1995, the rising number of students living in faraway districts and transportation problems prompted the Parents-Teachers Association to request the government for a more accessible and centralized location within the very center of the city and the Muscat Governorate. A spacious building at al-Inshirah Street in Madinat Qaboos became the school's next home from 1995 until 1997. New teachers were hired, followed by an additional four arriving for the year 1996-1997 in order to handle the growing student population. The Pledge of Loyalty, composed by Fe Edithaldine Vendiola, was first recited on April 21, 1996.

=== Al-Khuwair return (1997-2006) ===
The school would make its comeback to the al-Khuwair district during the year 1997-1998 to ensure proper accessibility for the student population from all districts of the capital, basing operations into a two-story villa in Block 247 of Way 4727 in al-Manhel Street of Al-Khuwair 33. With a decision to permanently settle in Al-Khuwair made in 1999, the continued increase in the student population necessitated the opening of an annex campus at Way 4144 of al-Kuleiah Street in the year 2000, where two departments: preschool and the first two grades of elementary primary level (Grades 1-2), were moved to and based in until 2001.

Later in the academic year 2001-2002, the school found greater convenience when it moved to another Al-Khuwair 33 location: the al-Janubayyah Street, occupying two separate bigger and more presentable villas within walking distance from each other until the end of year 2006-2007.

=== Present site (2007-present) ===
In April 2005, a large hectare of land in Al-Khuwair Heights was acquired by the school's board of directors, with the construction of the current building starting during the school year 2005-2006. After the transfer of the school to the new site, it was inaugurated by the 2004-2010 Philippine ambassador to Oman, Acmad D. Omar Sr, which coincided with the opening of classes in June for the school year 2007-2008.

Since the year 2009-2010, Islamic prayers have been recited following the school's main prayer. Two break-in robberies occurred in September of this school year, necessitating the start of security services in the academic year 2010-2011.

In the year 2011-2012, the school's student council welcomed its first non-Filipino president. The same school year's graduation introduced an academic sash that is now worn by graduating students of any academic year.

==== K-12 era ====
School year 2012-2013 marked a new start with the implementation of the enhanced basic education curriculum, known as K-12, with the old K-4th Year curriculum coexisting alongside it until the graduation of the old curriculum students in 2015. The implementation of the K-12 program necessitated again an annex building, which was built across the current school building between 2015 and 2016, and opened in 2017. This facility now houses the senior high school department, along with the newsletter and yearbook clubs.

The school welcomed its first batch of fifteen senior high school students during the year 2016-2017. With the last certificates of the old curriculum awarded to the said school year's sixth grade graduates, the K-4th year was entirely phased out in June 2017, and the school fully transitioned to the K-12 curriculum during school year 2017-2018. By the end of the same school year, the institution produced its first set of senior high school graduates.

Subsequently, the school became a member of the Association of Philippine Schools Overseas. In 2019, a perpetual recognition was granted to the school.

Since then, the school had evolved from a simple academic institution into a highly-structured organization, growing in terms of enrollment and size. As of 2022, the school has an enrollment of more than 800 students, 31 highly qualified and committed teaching staff, and nine (9) hardworking personnel. It also boasts a covered basketball court with bleachers, two libraries, two computer labs, and more modern facilities.

As of the year 2022, the school has been offering all strands and tracks of the Senior High School level. It produced its first set of full-fledged K-12 graduates on May 31, 2024.

=== New site ===
In April 2, 2024, after much campaigning and lobbying and with the help and cooperation of the Philippine Embassy-Muscat, Ministry of Education, and the Ministry of Housing and Urban Planning, the school was awarded its own land measuring 11,000 square meters at the al-Mabelah village of Seeb and Barka, where it will build its new campus.

== See also ==
- Filipinos in Oman
