= Native School =

Native School or native school may refer to:

- Native School, Adelaide, a school for local Aboriginal children in the colony of South Australia
- Native school of painting, developed during the Elizabethan era in England
- Native schools, established for Māori children in colonial New Zealand
- St Joseph's Native School and Orphanage at New Norcia mission in Western Australia

== See also ==
- Indian school (disambiguation)
