= Indian School, Salalah =

Coordinates: 17.033452°N 54.160075°E

Indian School Salalah
- Other name: المدرسة الهندية صلالة
- Motto: ॥ तमसो मा ज्योतिर्गमय ॥ (Thamasoma Jyothirgamaya)
- Motto in English: From Darkness to Light
- Type: Private
- Established: 11 July 1981
- Affiliations: CBSE, BOD of Indian Schools in Oman, NABET
- Chairman: Dr. Syed Ahmed Salman
- President: Dr. Syed Ahsan Jamil
- Principal: Ms. Saher M.A Sayed
- Administrative staff: 172 teaching and 20 non-teaching staff
- Students: Around 4600
- Location: Salalah, Dhofar, Oman
- Campus: 18195 m²; Dhariz
- Language: English
- Colors: Navy blue & White
- Nickname: ISS
- Website: Official website

The Indian School Salalah is an Indian-run, self-financing, co-educational institution, primarily established to meet the academic needs of children of Indian expatriates working in the Sultanate of Oman in the Persian Gulf. The school also admits children of other nationalities. The school is located in the Dahariz area, of Salalah town, in the southern governorate of Dhofar.

== Affiliation, curriculum and competitive examinations ==
The school is affiliated to the Central Board of Secondary Education (CBSE), New Delhi, India. It follows textbooks prescribed by the NCERT, New Delhi.

The school is structured into Kindergarten (LKG & UKG), Lower Primary (Grade 1 & 2), Primary (Grade 3 & 4), Middle School (Grade 5–8) and High School (Grade 9–12).

English is the primary medium of education, and students are required to learn Hindi as a second language from class 1 to 4. Arabic, French, Malayalam, or Tamil can substitute for Hindi from grades 5-10. A third language Arabic, Tamil, Malayalam, French or Hindi is a requirement in classes 5 to 8.

The school conducts All-India public exams regulated by the CBSE for classes 10 & 12.

The institution also holds the Maths olympiad conducted by the Indian National Mathematics Olympiad every February. All top scorers are awarded certificates. Olympiads for Maths, Science and Computer Science are conducted by the New South Wales University, Australia for classes 9th & 12th.

ISS holds the ASSET examination every year. This assessment is conducted by Educational Initiatives, India. Students of ISS also write the NGSE examination conducted by National Genius Search Foundation (NGSF), India and the NTSC Competitive Assessment. Students of class 5 to 10 also appear for the Shastra Prathibha contest conducted by Science India Forum Muscat (SIF Muscat) in association with Vijnana Bharathi.

ISS has taken part in national contests including Jhankaar Spectrum hosted by ISM, Times of Oman Quiz, Science Fiesta conducted by SIF Muscat, CBSE Oman Cluster Athletic Meet conducted by the Indian schools of Oman in association with CBSE board and Indian Embassy in Oman, Sports Fiesta, Ambassador's Ambedkar Essay Contest, SAI Essay and Poster Contest, Ambassador's Polemic Debate Challenge and National Quiz Pot.

== History ==
The 1970s and the 1980s witnessed rapid industrial growth in Oman as a result of the oil boom. This required extra employment and the need was met mainly by Indian workers on work permit visas. This community could not bring their children with them from India as there were no Indian academic facilities available then. The Indians in Salalah organised under an Indian club and submitted a petition to the Sultan of Oman, Qaboos bin Said al Said. He granted permission to construct a small building adjacent to the Indian Club at Haffa area in 1981.

The school started with classes only until class 4 but increased it by one every year.

In 1984, the school, being close to the Sultan's Al Hosn Palace was asked to relocate to Dahariz, a new area being developed for educational institutions. The school relocated to its new campus in September 1985.

The school was brought under the purview of the Ministry of private education, Oman in 1988. The ministry asked the Indian Embassy Oman to disband the old Indian Club sub committee that was managing the school until then and form an independent one consisting of prominent Indian expatriates in Salalah.

The school conducted its first class 10th CBSE public exam in 1988 and the class 12th public exam in 1994. It celebrated its Silver jubilee in February 2006.

It has also received the NABET accreditation in 2022, being one of the few schools in Oman to receive it.

== Facilities ==

The present campus at Dahariz has 15,297 sq m of area with 6,735 sq m built up. The school maintains a turfed playground (the largest lawn amongst all Gulf Schools) and a kindergarten playpen.

The main building is in the form of a rectangle with an open air quadrangle in the centre, that functions as a badminton court. All rooms are air conditioned to bear the extreme summer heat. The building also houses an indoor auditorium, five broadband connected computer labs, four science labs (chemistry lab, Biology lab, Physics lab and Junior science lab), a maths lab, staff rooms, two Music rooms, two computerised general libraries, a canteen for teachers, a primary library, Smart Board classes with Kyan multimedia, a first-aid room and an audio-visual room with multimedia facilities. A new block accommodates classes LKG to grade 2.

The school has facilities for teaching non-scholastic subjects like arts, craft, music (vocal and instrumental), computer, CCA, environment and physical education.

The school has about 150 classrooms to accommodate 4,000 students, with 175 plus teaching and more than 25 non-teaching staff. The school also provides a counsellor for the students. The new block was added to the existing building in August 2010.

== Activities ==
=== Houses ===
The school follows a "house" grouping system for conducting co-curricular activities. Each student is assigned to a house at the beginning of his/her first academic year and represents it when participating in any individual or team competition till he/she leaves the school. Victories award points to one's house. All points are added up at the end of the year and the top two houses are awarded trophies on annual day.

Blue, green, red and yellow are the four house colours used respectively represent the Sapphire, Emerald, Coral and Amber respectively; are seen by coloured stripes on the uniform neck-ties of boys or on the mass drill uniforms.

Teachers are appointed as house masters and mistresses to govern the houses. The Office Bearers for every house are elected by the students and administer their oath at the Investiture Ceremony every year.

=== Interhouse co-curricular activities ===
Inter-house competitions are held throughout the academic year, consisting of :-

- On-stage Cultural events— Debates (Turncoat and Parliamentary), Elocution ( English and Hindi), Extempore ( English), Poetry Recitation (English), Singing ( Group, Western Vocal, Indian Light Vocal, Indian Classical Vocal), Instrumental Music, Dumb-charade, Drama (Skits), Spelling Bee, Indian Folk Dance Multimedia Presentation, and Quizzes
- Off-stage Cultural events- Art (Drawing, Painting), Calligraphy (Arabic), Origami, Craft, Creative Writing, Digital Painting,
- Athletics— Sprints (50m, 80m, 100m, 200m, 400m, 1500m etc.), Jumps (Long Jump, High Jump, Triple Jump) Throws (Shot put, Javelin-throw, Discus-throw), Relays
- March Pasts
- Team Sports— Football (Soccer), Cricket, Baseball, Throwball, Basketball, Kho-Kho, Handball
- Indoor Sports- Badminton and Chess

=== Duke of Edinburgh Award Scheme ===
The school takes part in the Duke of Edinburgh Award Scheme also known as International Award For Young People (IAYP) for students from class 9 onwards. This is a scheme now spread throughout the Commonwealth and followed in India and Indian-based schools as the 'International Award For Young People'.

=== Scouts and Guides ===
The school also conducts the Scouts and Guides program in association with The Bharat Scouts and Guides from classes 5th to 8th. This program is an extra- curricular education consisting of outdoor physical activities like camping, hiking, knot tying, excursions and social services. The Scouts uniform is a deep grey shirt, navy blue pants with Scouts hat, neck kerchief and whistle while the Guides have a deep blue kurta and salvar, with neck kerchief and a campaign hat. Children from class 3 and 4 are enrolled as Cubs/ Bulbuls as a training before they enter the real senior Scouts and Guides program.

== International achievements ==
- Project Green Oman, a project launched to promote Eco-friendliness in Oman by two students of Indian School Salalah, won the World Environment Day Global School Contest 2012 conducted by the United Nations Conference on Sustainable Development. On June 5, 2014, International Energy Globe Award (dubbed as Nature's Nobel Prize) declared Hridith Sudev, one of the founders of Project GreenOman as their 2014 Energy Globe Laureate for his 'consistent Environmental stewardship'., He was also awarded the International Young EcoHero Award in 2017.
- Two of Indian School Salalah students, along with Social Science Department HOD were selected to attend Indian Republic Day Parade 2015 in New Delhi, India as part of Asianet News Proud to Be Indian (PTBI) in January 2015. Other schools from Oman which were selected for student representation in PTBI were Indian School Darsait, Indian School Jalan and Indian School Ibra.

== Notable alumni ==
- Sneha Ullal - Bollywood actress

== See also ==
- Salalah
- Indian Diaspora
