= Nenu Meeku Telusa? =

- Poster
- Directed by: Ajay Sastry
- Written by: Ajay Sastry
- Dialogue by: Ajay Sastry; Kishore Tirumala (Additional)
- Produced by: Lakshmi Manchu
- Starring: Manoj Manchu; Sneha Ullal; Riya Sen
- Cinematography: Sunil K. Reddy
- Edited by: Naveen Cuts; Basva Paidireddy
- Music by: Songs: Achu Rajamani; Score: Dharan; Santhosh–Shakti
- Production company: Sree Lakshmi Prasanna Pictures
- Release date: 8 October 2008
- Country: India
- Language: Telugu

Nenu Meeku Telusa? (transl. Do you know me?) is a 2008 Indian Telugu-language psychological thriller film directed by Ajay Sastry and produced by Lakshmi Manchu. The film stars the latter's brother Manoj Manchu alongside Sneha Ullal and Riya Sen, while Nassar and Brahmanandam play supporting roles. The film's songs are composed by Achu with score by Dharan and the duo Santhosh–Shakti.

Dubbed in Tamil as Ennai Theriyuma? in 2009, the film is inspired from 1994 Hollywood movie Clean Slate.

== Plot ==
Aditya (Machu Manoj) is a short-term memory loss patient. His ailment began after he suffered a brain injury in an accident in which his father died. In order to continue with his day-to-day activities, he depends on an audio cassette timed every morning by himself the previous night. His uncle and his doctor are the only people who know about his medical condition. Aditya has a girlfriend named Madhumitha (Riya sen). He has two important rules in his everyday regimen. The first rule is not to get drunk outside, and the second rule is that no matter where he goes, he has to ensure that he sleeps only in his home. He has to listen the tape in the next morning or else he will not remember anything.

One day, all of Aditya's friends in the office call him to a party and force him to drink. Aditya gets fully drunk and wakes up in his bedroom the next morning, but the tape he uses everyday to refresh his memory is erased, and he has no clue who did it. He starts to reconstruct his memories by whatever is available in his sight. As he starts to leave his flat, the police comes and interrogates him and asks him that he has complained about a missing car. As Aditya does not remember, he denies giving a complaint; however, the police finds the car in the basement parking. They open the car and find Aditya's uncle's dead body in the car's trunk. Aditya gets arrested. The police initially thinks that he is lying, but eventually when he is submitted to court, the judge submits him for medical examination, and they come to understand that he is a short-term memory loss patient. As the case is still not solved, police officer Anjali (Sneha Ullal) takes up the case by specially requesting the DGP.

The story now goes into a flashback where Aditya and Anjali are college sweethearts who break up because of a minor misunderstanding, after which Aditya reconciles and tries to reach her back, but then he meets with an accident and forgets his past. The story then returns to present, where Anjali gets involved with the investigation, but meets with a dead end at every corner. Finally, Aditya decides that he himself can solve the case, and the only problem is if he sleeps, he will forget. Hence, he decides not to sleep until the case is solved. Aditya tries to dig into his past and see if he can find any clues, and he finds out that Anjali was actually his girlfriend.

Finally, he calls up Madhumitha, and Anjali tells them that he has solved the case and asks them to come at 7:00 the next morning, when he will reveal the murderer. Aditya believes that Anjali might be the killer and waits for dawn. He controls himself the whole night, but just as it was about it be 7:00, his eyes finally give out, and he falls asleep. By the time he wakes up, he sees Anjali and Madhumitha holding guns against each other, both ask for help. Finally, Aditya shoots Madhumitha out of instinct, and she instantly dies on the spot.

Madhumitha's brother comes out and reveals the entire crime to Anjali. He confesses that his sister wanted to become the managing director of the company, but as Aditya is the legal heir, he will precede his uncle to that post. Hence she plans and becomes Aditya's girlfriend with an intent to steal the entire property, but his uncle came to know about that fact. Madhumitha and her brother then killed him and kept the dead body in Aditya's car so that the police may suspect him. The movie ends with Aditya marrying Anjali, who later on reminds him every morning about his past without him referring to a tape.

== Cast ==
- Manoj Manchu as Adithya
- Sneha Ullal as Anjali
- Riya Sen as Madhumitha
- P. Vasu as Adithya's father
- Nassar as Adithya's uncle
- Brahmanandam as Barmani
- Sunil as Kishore
- Uttej as Madhumitha's brother
- Tanikella Bharani as Company MD
- Harsha Vardhan as Doctor
- C. V. L. Narasimha Rao as Lawyer
- Mallikarjuna Rao as Police officer
- Ali as Scanny from Scotland
- Supreeth as Rowdy
- Noel Sean as Adithya's friend
- Nag Ashwin as Barmani's assistant
- Surekha Vani as Adithya's coworker
- Kausha Rach (special appearance in the song "Mabbe Masakesindile")

== Production ==
Ajay Sastry expressed interest in making the film as a Telugu-Tamil bilingual although the Tamil version was dropped in favour of a dubbed version.

== Soundtrack ==
The soundtrack has music composed by Achu. The music was released on 29 August 2008. The background score was composed by Dharan, Santhosh Narayanan and Shakti. The Telugu album features a remix of the song "Mabbe Masakesindile" from Vayasu Pilichindi. The Tamil album features a remix of the song "Yennai Theriyuma" from Kudiyirundha Koyil, and "Thanni Karuthiruchu" from Ilamai Oonjal Aadukirathu (the original of "Mabbe Masakesindile").

Nenu Meeku Telusa...?

Soundtrack album by Achu
- Released: 29 August 2008 (Audio Release)
- Genre: Feature film soundtrack
- Label: Sony BMG
- Producer: Lakshmi Manchu

Achu chronology
Nenu Meeku Telusa...? (2008)	Kurradu (2009)

Track listing
No.	Title	Singer(s)	Length
1.	"Emaindo Gaani Chusthu"	Sriram Parthasarathy, Karthik (Chorus)	04:14
2.	"Enduko Madi"	Hemachandra, Bombay Jayashri	04:24
3.	"Mabbe Masakesindile"	Silambarasan, Geetha Madhuri	04:31
4.	"Cheppaka Thappaduga"	Achu, Sunitha Sarathy	03:49
5.	"Yenno Yenno"	Premji Amaren, Harini	04:14
6.	"Kannu Theristhe Jananamele"	Naveen Madhav, Ranjith	03:58
7.	"Theme Music"	Sagar	02:16

== Reception ==
A critic from Bangalore Mirror wrote, "The movie looks refreshing though the pace is halted by poor editing. Some of the sub-plots have no connection with the main story," and concluded that the film could be watched once. Jeevi of Idlebrain.com wrote that "the team of NMT must be appreciated for breaking the shackles of doing routine and formulaic films in order to do a different film".
