= Sneha Ullal =

Indian film actress (born 1987)

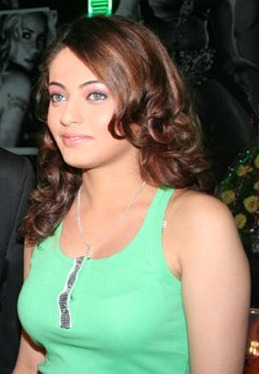
- Ullal in 2013
- Born: 18 December 1987 (age 38); Muscat, Oman
- Citizenship: India
- Occupation: Actress
- Years active: 2005–present

Sneha Ullal (born 18 December 1987) is an Indian actress who has appeared in Telugu and Hindi films. She is known for her roles in the Hindi film Lucky: No Time for Love and the Telugu films Ullasamga Utsahamga and Simha.

== Early life ==
Sneha Ullal was born and brought up in Muscat, Oman to a Tulu Devadiga father from Mangalore and a Sindhi mother. She studied at Indian School Muscat and Indian School, Salalah in Oman. Later, she moved to Mumbai with her mother and attended Durelo Convent High School and studied at Vartak College. Arpita, adoptive sister of Salman Khan spotted her and she got to act at 17 in 2003 when she just completed her 12th Std in the Hindi film Lucky: No Time for Love.

== Career ==
Ullal made her movie debut in the 2005 Hindi movie Lucky: No Time for Love opposite Salman Khan. After the movie, she was noted for her striking similarities in appearance with Aishwarya Rai. She later said that although the comparison didn't help her as an actor, it gave her a lot of recognition. Ullal then appeared with Khan's brother Sohail Khan in Aryan, which did not do well at the box office.

Fearing that she was too young and needed to be more mature to work in movies, she took a break from Bollywood. She made her debut in Telugu movies with Ullasamga Utsahamga, which turned out to be a huge hit in 2008. Nenu Meeku Telusa? was her second Telugu release. It was followed by an appearance in the song Nuvvu ready in the Telugu movie King opposite Nagarjuna.

In 2007, she was to appear in Pirate's Blood by prolific horror filmmaker and character actor Steg Dorr. In interviews, Dorr would say "we canceled them because of a hurricane. We could not get it going on and the financing fell through." The role later went to Oman actress Maimoon Al-Balushi.

Later, she signed Kaashh... Mere Hote to show that she is still interested in Hindi films. Her next few films didn't do well at the box office, but her 2010 release Simha opposite Balakrishna turned out to be a blockbuster.

In 2014, she played a part in the Teluga film Antha Nee Mayalone, after which she took almost a four year break. Ullal announced in June 2017 that her break from films was due to her battle with an autoimmune disease. The disease had made filming difficult since she could not stand for more than 30 to 40 minutes at a time. In October 2017, she played in her first dual role in the Tollywood film Ayushman Bhava. Ullal played a lawyer in Zurich Media House LLP’s production of Love You Loktantra in October 2022.

== Filmography ==
Key
†	Denotes films that have not yet been released

=== Films ===
Year	Title	Role	Language	Notes	Ref.
2005	Lucky: No Time for Love	Lucky Negi	Hindi		
2006	Aryan	Neha A. Varma	Hindi		
2007	Jaane Bhi Do Yaaron	Herself	Hindi	Cameo appearance	
2008	Ullasamga Utsahamga	Dhanalakshmi	Telugu	Santosham Best Debut Actress Award	
2008	Nenu Meeku Telusa?	Anjali	Telugu		
2008	King	Herself	Telugu	Special appearance in the song "Nuvvu Ready"	
2009	Kaashh... Mere Hote	Radhika	Hindi		
2009	Current	Sneha	Telugu		
2010	Click	Aarti Kaushik	Hindi		
2010	Varudu	Nisha	Telugu	Cameo appearance	
2010	Simha	Janaki	Telugu		
2011	Ala Modalaindi	Kavya	Telugu		
2011	Devi		Kannada		
2011	Gandhi Park	Priyanka Phillip	English		
2011	Madatha Kaja	Swapna	Telugu		
2012	Most Welcome	Herself	Bengali	Special appearance in the song "Most Welcome"	
2013	Action 3D	Sameera	Telugu		
2014	Antha Nee Mayalone		Telugu		
2015	Bezubaan Ishq	Rumzum	Hindi		
2022	Love You Loktantra		Hindi		
2025	Saako 363	Amrita Devi Bishnoi	Hindi		
2026	Nilakanta		Telugu		

=== Web series ===
Year	Title	Role(s)	Language(s)	Platform
2020	Expiry Date	Disha	Telugu, Hindi	ZEE5
