= Indian School, Muladha =

Coordinates: 23.7599°N 57.5547°E

Indian School Muladha
- Muladha, Al Batinah; Muladha, Al Batinah South Governorate; Oman

Information
- School type: Private English Medium Secondary School
- Motto: Satyameva Jayate (Satyameva Jayate (सत्यमेव जयते) translates to **"Truth Alone Triumphs"** in English.)
- Established: 1991
- School board: CBSE (Central Board of Secondary Education)
- School number: AFFILIATION NUMBER: 6130007
- School code: 90170
- President: Mr. M.T Musthafa
- Principal: Dr. Leena Francis
- Teaching staff: 86
- Key people: Dr. LEENA FRANSIS Mr. ASHICK KP, Mr. JAILAL V.C, Mrs. SHEEJA A JALEEL, Mrs. JEBA PRIYADHARSHINI
- Grades: K-12
- Gender: Co-educational
- International students: International Students Indian School Muladha is home to a diverse group of international students, primarily from Egypt, Bangladesh, and Pakistan, with some students also hailing from Sri Lanka, Iran, and other countries. This international presence enriches the school community, fostering cultural exchange and promoting global understanding among students.
- Average class size: 35 - 40 students per classes on average.
- Language: English Medium
- Hours in school day: 7:00 AM - 2:00 PM
- Classrooms: The school has 56 sections of classes from KG to XII function in the premises.
- Campus size: Muladha Campus; 16-acre (0.065 km^{2})
- Area: 16 acres
- Houses: Salalah House; Muscat House; Sur House; Nizwa House
- Colors: The School's logo contains the following five colors: -Red – In the flame, lamp, and book detailing. -Yellow/Gold – In the flame and circular border. -Green – In the laurel wreath. -Blue – In the text "सत्यमेव जयते" and book details. -White – In the background and book pages.
- Slogan: "In Pursuit of Excellence"
- Song: In this school the abode of knowledge.
- Nickname: ISML
- Publication: https://isml-oman.com/e-magazine
- School fees: The fee structure varies depending on the nationality of the ward. It is give in the school website: https://isml-oman.com/fee-structure/
- Affiliations: Central Board of Secondary Education, India
- Alumni name: Indian School Muladha Alumni (ISML – A)
- Website: Official website
- Last updated: 24 August 2025

Indian School Muladha is an English Medium Secondary School, started in 1991, in a small building with 9 teachers and 90 students. It is now one of the largest interior schools in the Sultanate of Oman with around 2100 students and around 80 staff including teaching and non-teaching.

== Location ==
The school is 120 kilometres away from Muscat on the Muscat-Dubai highway in the South Batinah region. The school is located in a sprawling 16 acres of lush green land in sharp contrast to the desert enveloping it.

== Facilities ==
Classes: KG I to Class XII classes are taught in Indian School Muladha.

Facilities: Work Experience, Library, Audio Visual Room, Laboratories, Auditorium, Canteen, Remedial Classes, Environmental Classes, Staff transport, Educational trips, Medical Check - Up, Staff Excursion, Activity Room.

Laboratories: Three fully equipped Science labs, a Math Lab, three Computer Labs and one Audio Visual Room.

Sports: Playground for games like Cricket, Volleyball, Football, Hockey, Kho Kho, Kabaddi, Badminton, etc.

== International Students ==
Indian School Muladha is home to a diverse group of international students, primarily from Egypt, Bangladesh, and Pakistan, with some students also hailing from Sri Lanka, Iran, and other countries. This international presence enriches the school community, fostering cultural exchange and promoting global understanding among students.
