= Darsait =

- Interactive map of Darsait
- Coordinates: 23°37′N 58°32′E
- Country: Oman
- Governorate: Muscat

Darsait is a residential locality in Muscat, the capital of the Sultanate of Oman. It is known for its wide array of residences ranging from small studio apartments to single-family villas. Darsait has a population around 150,000 to 200,000. It is also one of the more prominent localities of Muscat. This is where a majority of the Indian population that has migrated to Muscat over the years stays. Therefore, it is also known as Little India of Muscat. It also has many Great football talents in Oman.

== Schools ==
- Indian School, Muscat
- Indian School, Darsait
- Pakistan School Muscat
- Al Huda Private school
- Riyadh Al Ghad private school

== Places of worship ==
- Sts. Peter & Paul Church, Ruwi
- Darsait Krishna Temple
- Noor Mosque

== Government offices ==
- Baladiya Muscat (municipal office)

== Hospital ==
• KIMS Oman Hospital
