= Wadi Kabir =

- Town
- Location in Oman
- Coordinates: 23°35′N 58°34′E
- Country: Oman
- Governorate: Muscat Governorate
- Time zone: UTC+4 (Oman Standard Time)

Wadi Kabir is a Township near Ruwi in the Omani capital Muscat, in northeastern Oman.

On July 15, 2024, three Islamic State (IS) gunmen opened fire at the Shia Imam Ali Mosque in the township, marking the first incident of a terrorist attack in Oman's history.
