= Indian School, Sohar =

Indian School Sohar

Location
- Sohar; Oman; 24°20′23″N 56°44′47″E

Information
- Type: Private
- Motto: Tamaso Ma Jyotir Gamaya(lead me from darkness to light)
- Established: 1982
- President: Mr. Abraham George
- Principal: Sanchita verma
- Grades: KG-12
- Gender: Co-educational
- Website: School website

Indian School Sohar (ISS) is an English co-educational school for Indians in the Al Hambar area of Sohar, Oman. It was founded in 1982 and is managed by members of the Indian business community. The school has students from kindergarten to Class 12 and is affiliated with the Central Board of Secondary Education in India.

Its logo includes "From darkness to light" in Sanskrit and English, with a lamp in the center flanked by a pair of swans and an open book (symbolizing learning).

== Awards and achievements ==
ISS won the Shastra Pratibha Contest in 2008 and 2009 in the sub-senior group, receiving the Indian Ambassador's Rolling Trophy. The contest is organised by Science India Forum, with the trophy awarded to the winning school. A school team was runner-up in the school-team category in the annual Times of Oman quiz. The finals were held on 17 April 2009 in the Qurum amphitheater. One hundred seventy-nine teams participated from all over Oman, and ISS finished fourth; Indian ambassador to Oman H.E. Anil Wadhwa visited the school. ISS organises competitive events for students to hone their skills.

ISS has been part of the national news. The school has participated in international Olympiads, including the 2009 International Informatics Olympiad. Seven students secured a perfect 10 in the 2011 Class 10 (AISSE) exams. Four students from the 2010–2011 Class 12 received INSPIRE scholarships (Rs 400,000 over five years) from the Department of Science and Technology for reaching the top one percent in the 2011 CBSE Class 12 Board exams. A Class 11 student won third prize in the Ambassador's Polemic Challenge and was congratulated by Anil Wadhwa, ambassador of India to Oman. ISS students topped the Young Bulls competition held in 2012. The ISS annual Sports Day has been covered by the Times of Oman. The school received the Ambassador's Trophy for most improved school in Oman from Ambassador J.S. Mukul at a conference at Muscat.
