= Indian School, Muscat =

International school in Muscat, Oman

Indian School Muscat (abbreviated: ISM) is an Indian school in the Darsait area of Muscat, Oman.

The school is a non commercial organization established and funded by the local Indian community and parents. It is managed by a group of 15-21 honorary members (known as SMC) appointed by the Board of Directors (The Apex Body) formed according to the by-laws of Indian schools in Oman approved by the Government of Oman. The school is affiliated with the Central Board of Secondary Education, New Delhi, India.

== History ==
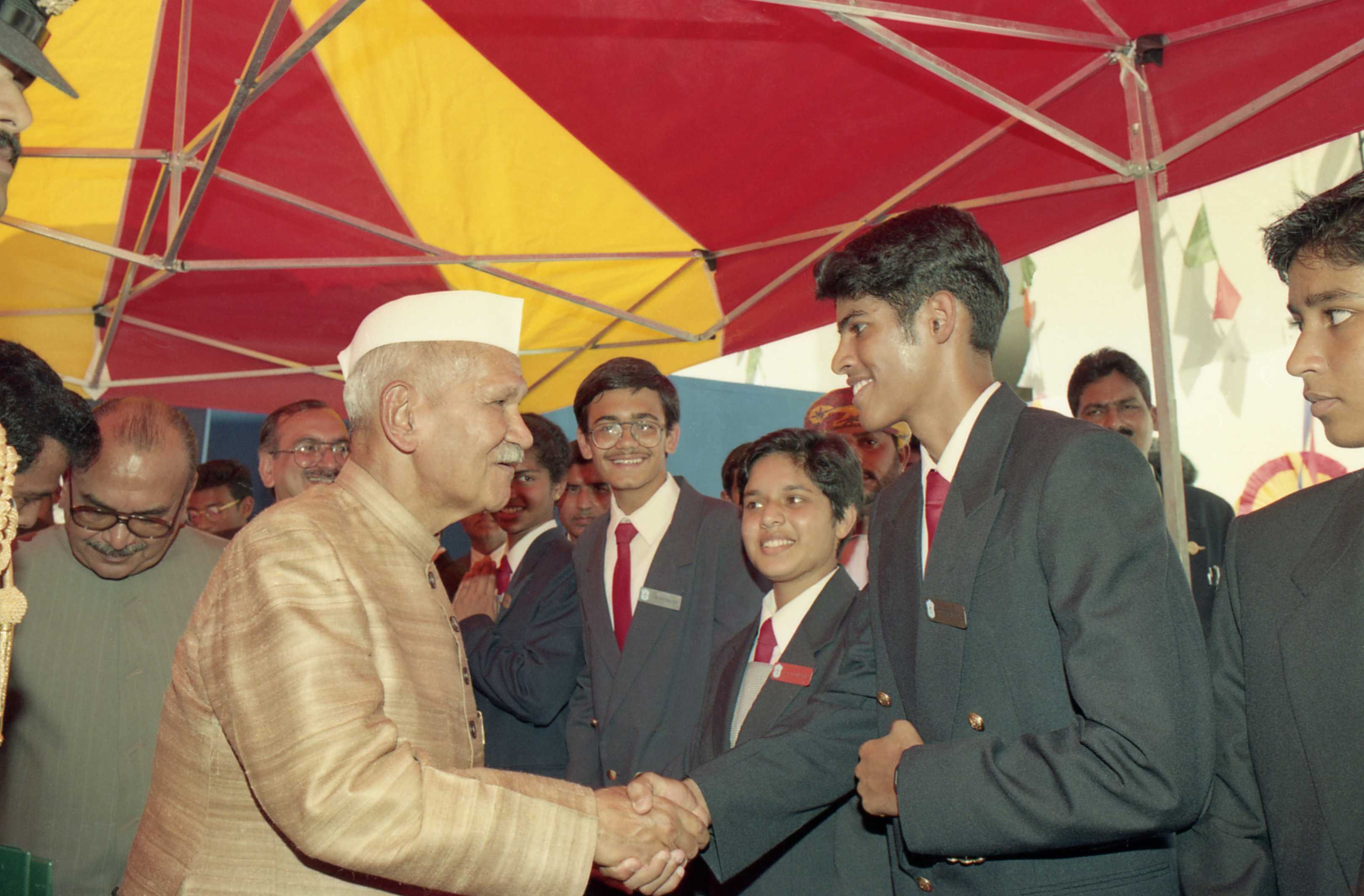
President of India, Shankar Dayal Sharma interacting with students at the Indian School Muscat

It was founded in 1975 as the Central Indian School with 135 students. Qaboos bin Said al Said, the ruler of the Sultanate of Oman granted land in Darsait that enabled the school to be established. Since then, the school has grown quickly, both in terms of enrollment and size. As of 2026, the school had an enrollment of over 9,200 students. The primary school is now being taken as two shifts taking into consideration the number of enrollments. The school has two auditoriums, three libraries, four computer labs, indoor facilities, two basketball courts, a football ground, a atheletics track, a robotics lab, and two science labs.

== Indian School Muscat Alumni ==
Indian School Muscat Alumni (ISMA) was established on 17 December 1997.

The primary objective of ISMA is to support the school in initiatives to foster friendship and fellowship among the students, teachers and alumni. ISMA hosts professional, social and cultural events for the benefit of its members. ISMA provides loyalty benefits to its members through corporate programs.

ISMA has launched a Sponsor a Student initiative - KINDLE, which is a platform to help fund the education and advancement of children from homes of low income families

Notable alumni include tennis player Mahesh Bhupathi, Oman cricketer Jatinder Singh, actress Sneha Ullal, pop singer Sanam Puri, actress Sarah Jane Dias.and global personality Syed Sulaiman Basheer

== Student Activities ==
The school is a member of the Duke of Edinburgh's Award. The scheme was launched on 18 November 1992 with 23 girls and 20 boys from the school. The school has had over 300 award entrants, who take part in confidence, character and team building activities including social / community service and group excursions.The school also has 20 clubs in which students can enroll to improve their skills such as the robotics club, the IT club, and many more(check official school website)

The school has a student government system, which consists of a student council and prefects. The student council consists of 20 members (10 boys and 10 girls) elected by the students and then interviewed by the faculty.
