= Indian School, Darsait =

Indian School Darsait

Location
- (Oman) Muscat; Oman; 23°37′40″N 58°32′31″E

Information
- Type: Private school
- Motto: Lighted to Enlighten
- Established: July 1992
- President: Mr. Shalimar Moideen
- Principal: Dr. S. Srinivasan
- Accreditation: NABET
- Website: Official website

Indian School Darsait is an Indian School in Muscat, under the supervision of the Indian Embassy in Oman. This school is affiliated to Central Board of Secondary Education Of India. It is located in Darsait, Muscat, in the Sultanate of Oman.

== History ==
Indian School Darsait was initially set up as the Kerala State Board Syllabus Stream (KSBS) of Indian School Muscat in July 1992.

In 2004, the school management decided to run a parallel CBSE stream. Later, the KSBS stream was discontinued and the school continued as a full-fledged CBSE affiliated school. It is the only Indian Community School in Oman that received NABET accreditation.

== Notable alumni ==
- Aparna Das, actress
