= Majlis (disambiguation) =

Majlis (Arabic: المجلس, pl. مجالس Majālis) is an Arabic term meaning council.

Majlis may also refer to:

- Majlis is also used to mean a salon (musical or scientific), especially during the Abbasid era, e.g., for discussing the recent translations from Greek. This sense is sometimes now distinguished as an "adabi majlis" ("artistic majlis"), see dewaniya
- Mäjilis, lower house of the Parliament of Kazakhstan
- Mejlis of the Crimean Tatar People, Crimean Tatar rights organisation
- People's Majlis, the Parliament of Maldives
- Majlis (magazine), Persian magazine published in Tehran between 1906 and 1908
- Majlis al Jinn, cave chamber in Oman
- Majlis Park metro station, Delhi, India
- Majlis al Shura (disambiguation), multiple councils

== See also ==
- Majlesi (disambiguation)
- Majlis al-Nuwwab (disambiguation)
- Majlis Al-Umma (disambiguation)
- Majlis-e Ahrar-e Islam, Muslim political party in the Indian subcontinent
- All India Majlis-e-Ittehadul Muslimeen, a political party in India that works for the upliftment of Muslims and other minority communities in India
- Majlishpur Assembly constituency, legislative assembly constituency in Tripura, India
- Kot Majlas, a village in Punjab, India
