= Tourism in Oman =

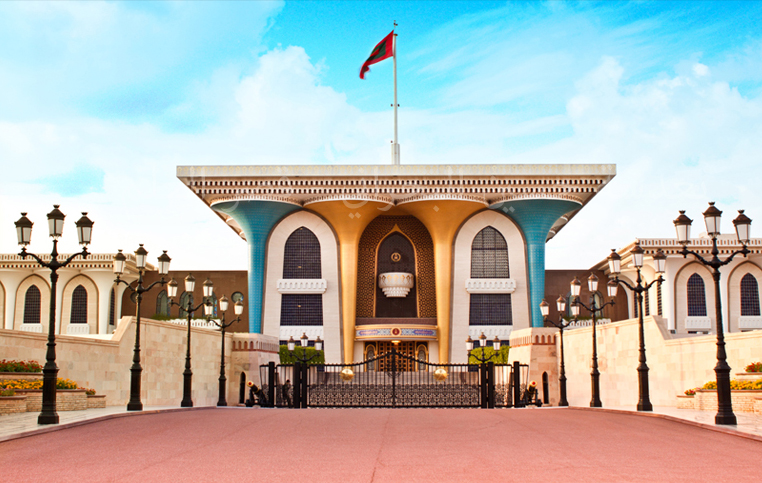
Al-Alam Palace is one of the most famous landmarks in Oman

Oman is a country on the Arabian Peninsula. Tourism in Oman grew considerably during the 2000s, and a 2013 report predicted that it would become one of the largest industries in the nation. In 2019, Oman attracted about 4.1 million visitors from around the world, a massive increase from 3.1 million in 2017 as per the 2019 Tourism Statistic Bulletin from the National Centre for Statistics and Information (NCSI), Oman. By the end of 2025 visitor arrivals had reached about 3.9 million, an increase of 1.8 per cent on 2024, according to the centre's December 2025 tourism indicators report.

Oman has various tourist attractions, particularly within the realm of cultural tourism. Muscat was named the best city to visit in the world by American travel guide publisher Lonely Planet in 2012, and was chosen as the Capital of Arab Tourism of 2012.

== Statistics ==
Yearly tourist arrivals in thousands

Tourist arrivals of 2024 (k)

Tourist arrivals of 2024 (%)

== Visa ==
Visa policy of Oman Oman Visa-free Visa required

Visitors to Oman must obtain a visa prior to travel unless they come from one of the visa exempt countries. Citizens of member nations of the Gulf Cooperation Council may travel to Oman without visa limits. Nationals of 69 other countries can apply for visas online which are valid for a period of 30 days. All visitors must hold a passport valid for 6 months.

== Nature-based activities ==
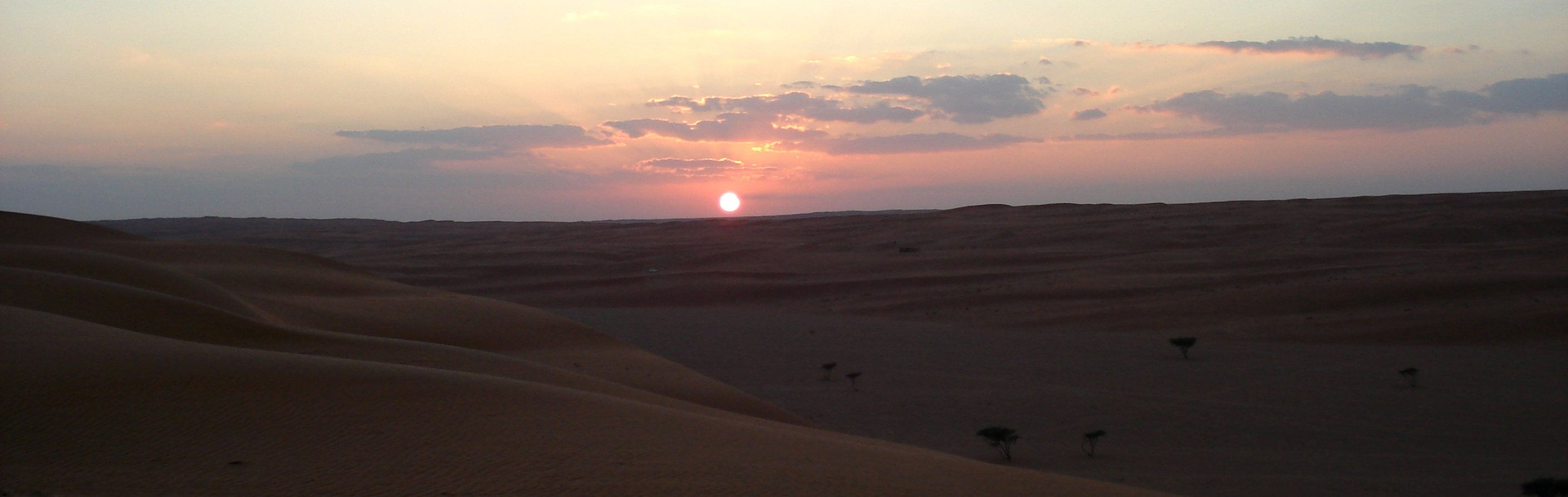

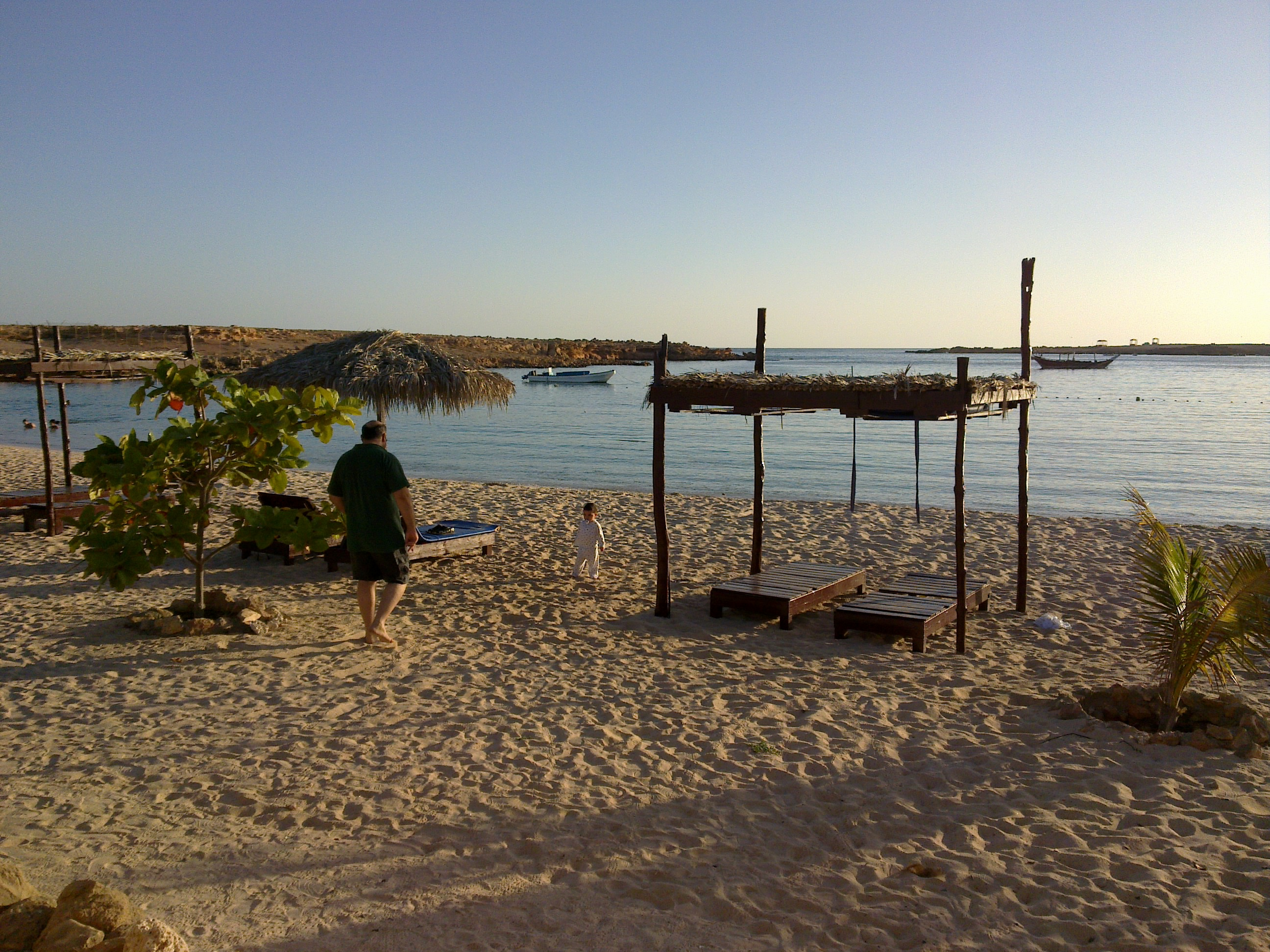

=== Beach activities ===
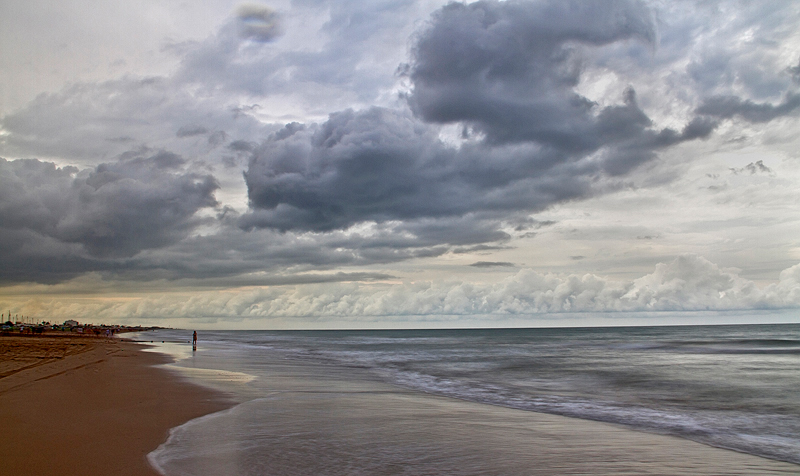
Seeb Beach

Oman's coast is lined with many beaches, with resort hotels on the coast west and east of Muscat. Activities including sunbathing, swimming, kitesurfing, diving, snorkeling, boating and water scooters, surfing, beach combing, shell collecting and fishing excursions.

==== Kitesurfing ====
The daily sea breeze effect gives rise to reliable kitesurfing conditions. Centres can be found in Muscat, Al Sawadi Beach, Alzaiba Beach and on Masirah Island.

=== Desert safari ===
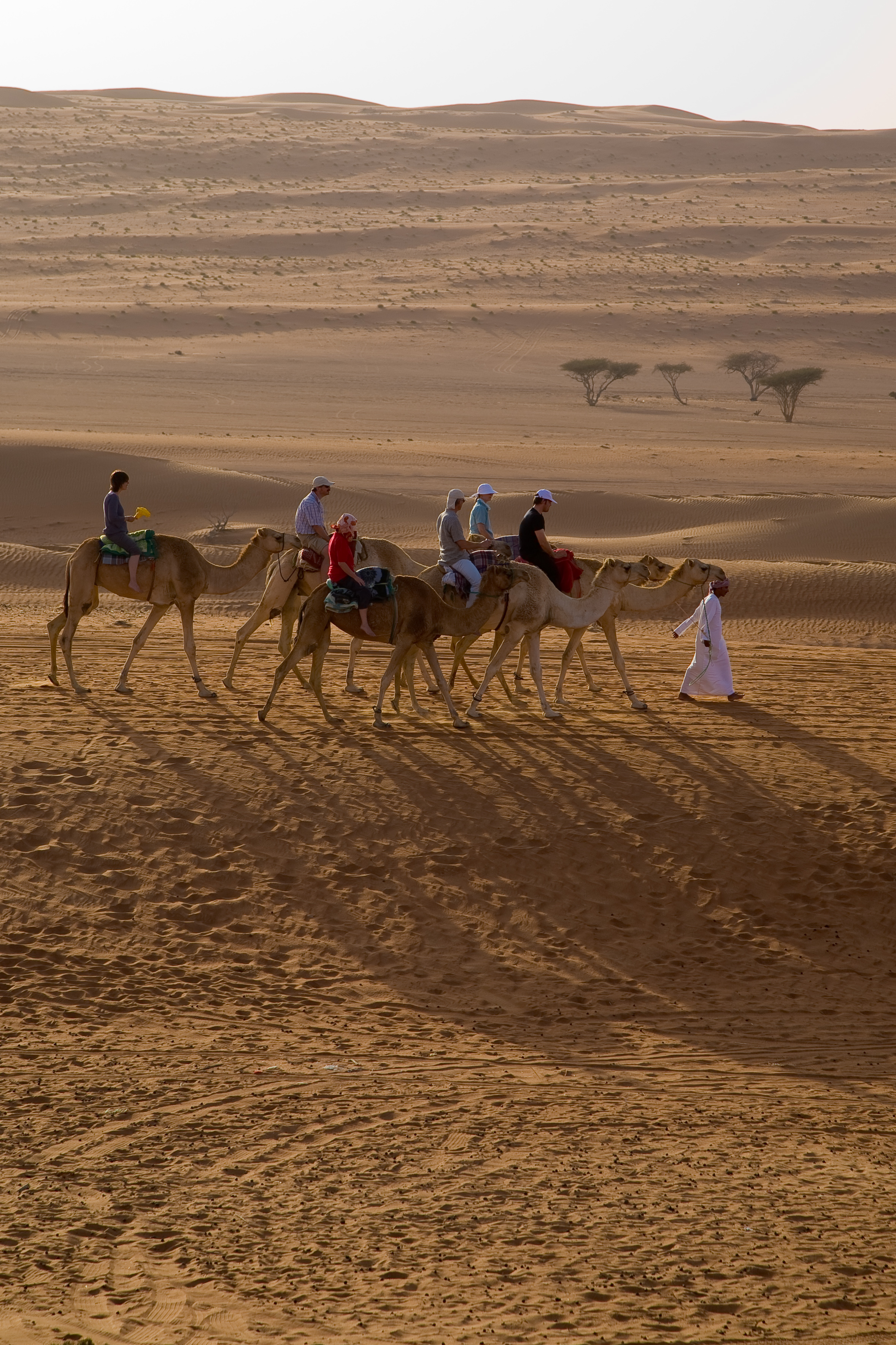
Tourists riding camels in the Sharqiya Sands

Camelback or four-wheel drive journeys into the Sharqiya Sands, formerly known as Wahiba Sands and other desert areas are popular, sometimes incorporating stays in Barsti huts, barbecues, camel riding, sandboarding and visits to Bedouin communities.

=== Caving ===
The limestone rich sedimentary deposits of Oman's mountains have led to cave formation in many places. In 2008, the Ministry of Tourism issued a plan to develop Majlis al Jinn, the world's second largest cave, as a show cave, after their first show cave, Al Hoota Cave, attracted 75,000 visitors in the first year of operation. There are caves which can be accessed by amateurs, like Muqal Cave in Wadi Bani and Khalid and in Baydiah in Ash Sharqiyah region, while others need considerable effort, training, experience and specialized equipment.

== Historic and cultural locations ==
=== Markets ===
Omani souqs (markets) are popular with tourists, and are highly diverse with stalls selling handicrafts such as silver and gold artefacts and textiles. There are souqs in every Omani town, with the Ruwi and Muttrah Souqs the best known in Muscat.

=== Forts ===
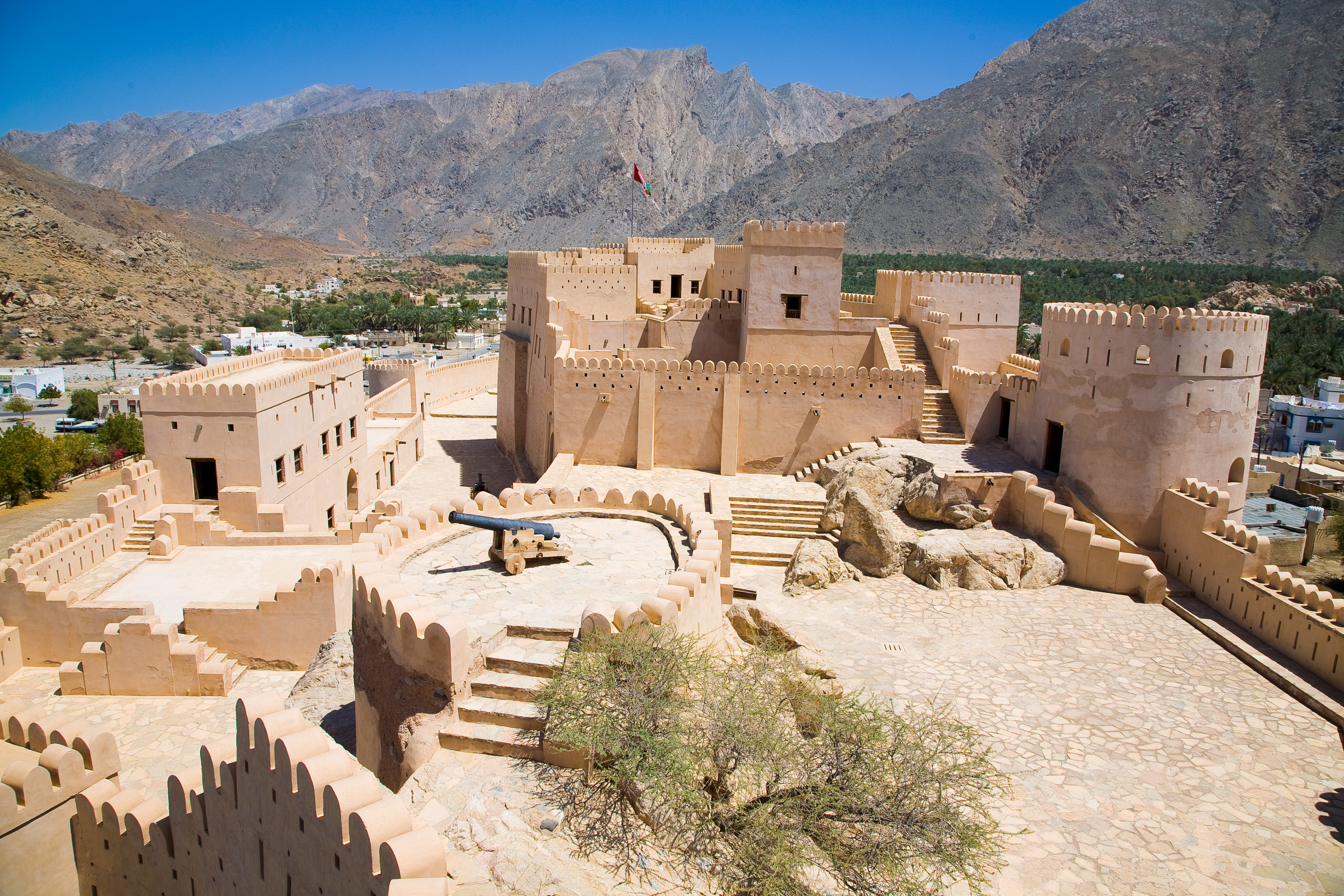
Nakhal Fort

Nearly every Omani city and town has a fort, most of which were built, or had major expansions, during the Al-Yarubi dynasty between 1624 and 1744. Their purpose was as a refuge for the people and a last line of defense for the town. Forts were prepared to withstand long sieges with water wells, food storing capacity and secret tunnels ending many kilometers away from the walls of the fort. In times of peace they served as centres of governance, educational establishments or community facilities.

=== World Heritage Sites ===
UNESCO's International Heritage Preserve Programme Administration lists four elements of cultural significance in Oman.

==== Bahla Fort ====
Part of the capital of the Nabhani dynasty, who dominated Oman and prospered in the Arabian Peninsula during the late Middle Ages.

==== Archaeological Sites of Bat, Al-Khutm and Al-Ayn ====
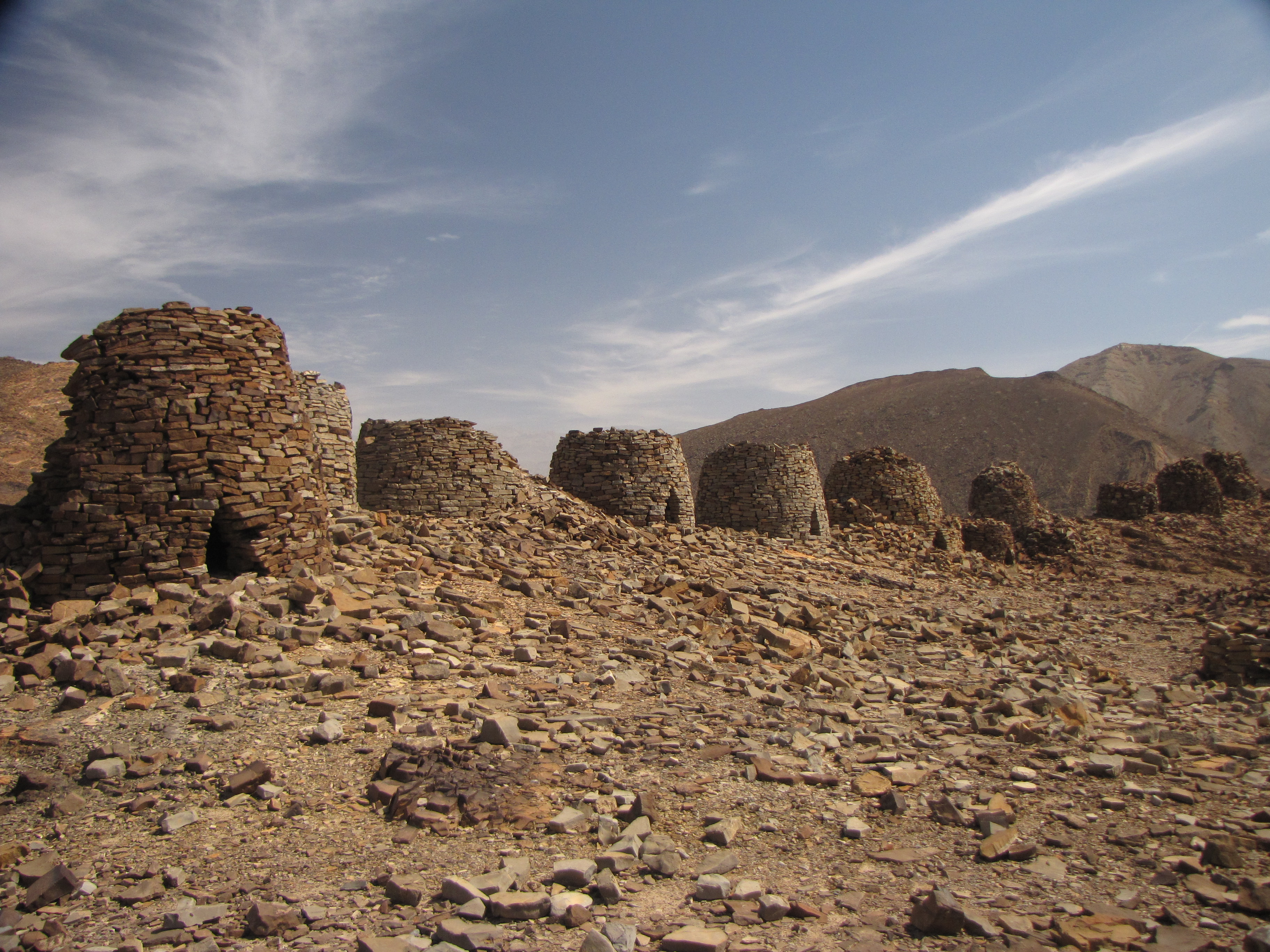
The graves at Al-Ayn in Oman

Remnants of settlements and necropolises from the 3rd millennium BCE. The necropolis of Bat reflects the funeral practices of the early Bronze Age.

==== Land of Frankincense ====
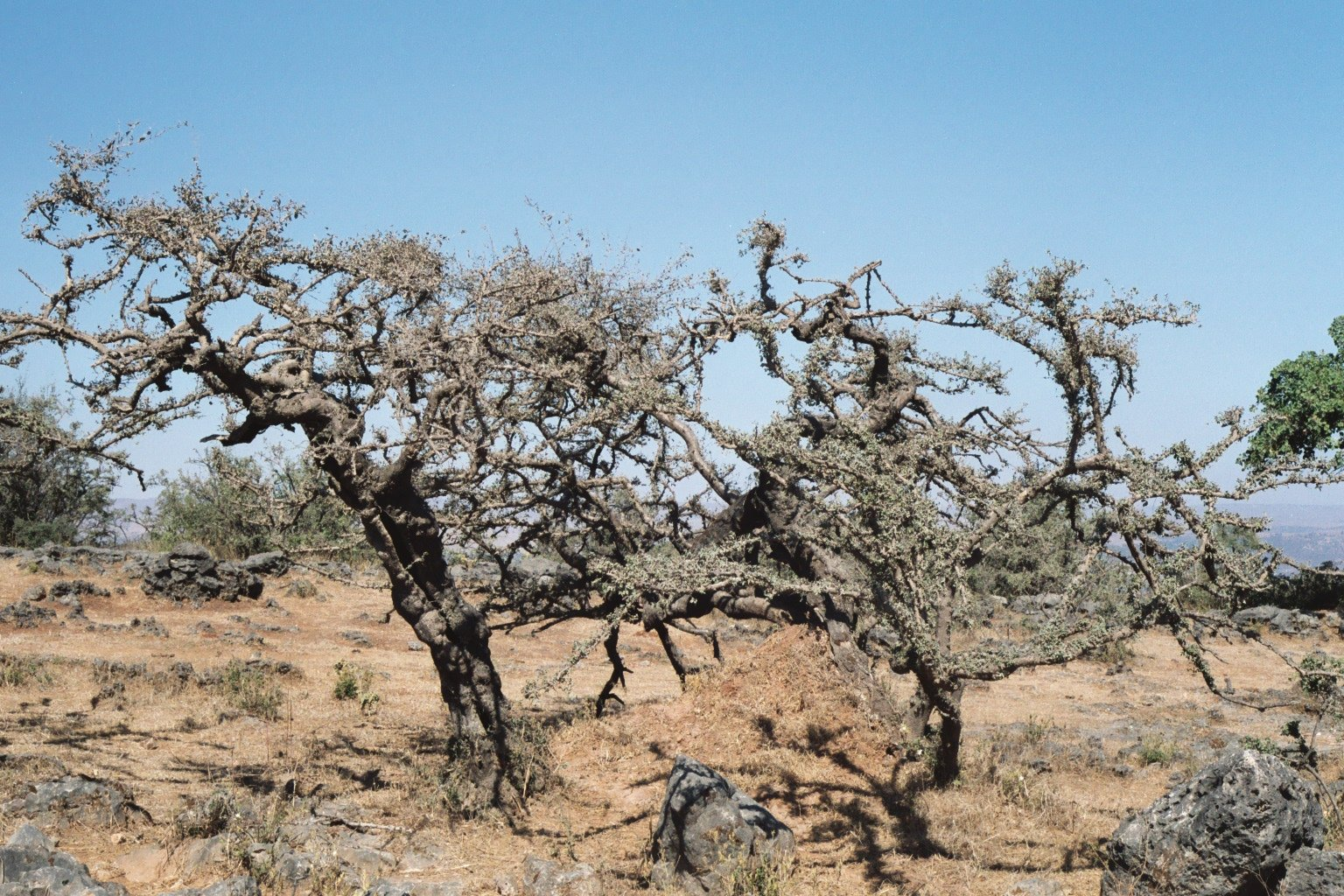
Frankincense trees in Dhofar in southern Oman

Various sites were important in the production and distribution of frankincense, which was once a sought-after item of luxury in antiquity, including the ancient ports of Khor Rori and Al-Baleed, and the caravan oases of Shisr and Wadi Dawkah

==== Falaj irrigation systems ====
Five falajs were inscribed in 2006 to represent an irrigation method dating back to at least 500 CE, and still used in most Omani towns and villages, that distributes water through gravity.

== Cultural events ==
=== Muscat Festival ===
The Muscat Festival is held annually in January and February. International exhibits and displays of traditional Omani lifestyle, art and culture are featured, with circus and street theatre productions are also a part of the event.

=== Salalah Festival ===
The Salalah Festival takes place in the months of July and August, when the area is cooler than elsewhere in the Gulf states, and is a family oriented event with cultural, traditional and modern artistic shows.

=== Cultural theatre program ===
The Ministry of Tourism organises a number of cultural evenings at the ancient Al Flayj Castle and Al Morooj theatres, hosting groups from around the world, from December to the end of March.

== Sporting and adventure events ==
=== Horse and camel racing ===
From September to June, equestrian races organised by the Oman Equestrian Federation are held in various towns. Public events are staged at the royal stables in Seeb, while most breeders and trainers are based in the Al Kamil/Al Wafi region.

Long distance camel races are held on specially built race tracks, normally on public holidays and during National Day celebrations. As with horse races, camel races are arranged by the OEF, although some regions organize their own local races.

=== Dubai–Muscat offshore sailing race ===
The Dubai–Muscat regatta takes place every January. Boats set sail from Dubai, passing through the Straits of Hormuz before heading towards Muscat and ending at the Bandar Al-Rawdah Marina.

=== Sinbad Classic ===
An international deep sea fishing contest, the Sinbad Classic is one of the IGFA World Championships qualifying rounds and takes place each April.

=== Oman Adventure ===
A five-day endurance race held annually in November, each team consists of a runner and a cyclist and must manage the preparation and coordination of their own food and water and other supplies.

=== Oman International Rally ===
The Oman International Rally held annually in March, is one of the events that constitute the Middle East Rally Championship.

=== Bidiyah Challenge ===
A race to scale sand dunes held every February in Bidiya in Sharqiyah Region.

=== Tour of Oman ===
An annual professional road bicycle racing stage race held in Oman since 2010 as part of the UCI Asia Tour. Its stated goals are to promote cycling as a sport in Oman; to put Oman on the world stage as an attractive tourist destination; and stimulate trade and economic activity within the country.

== Gallery ==
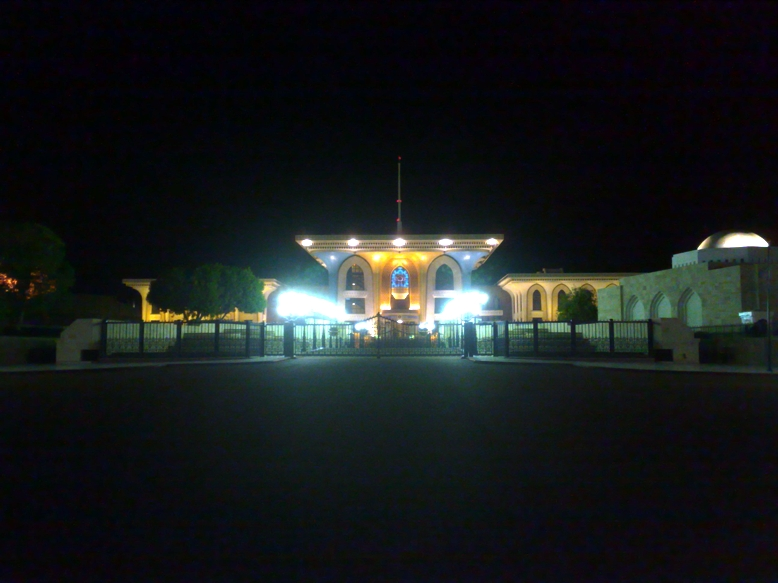
Al Alam Palace, Muscat

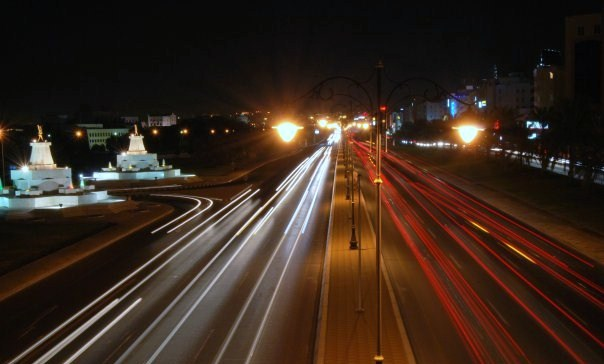
Al Khuwair - The two Khanjar's (left of image) mark the entrance to the Ministries Street which houses all the Ministries of Oman

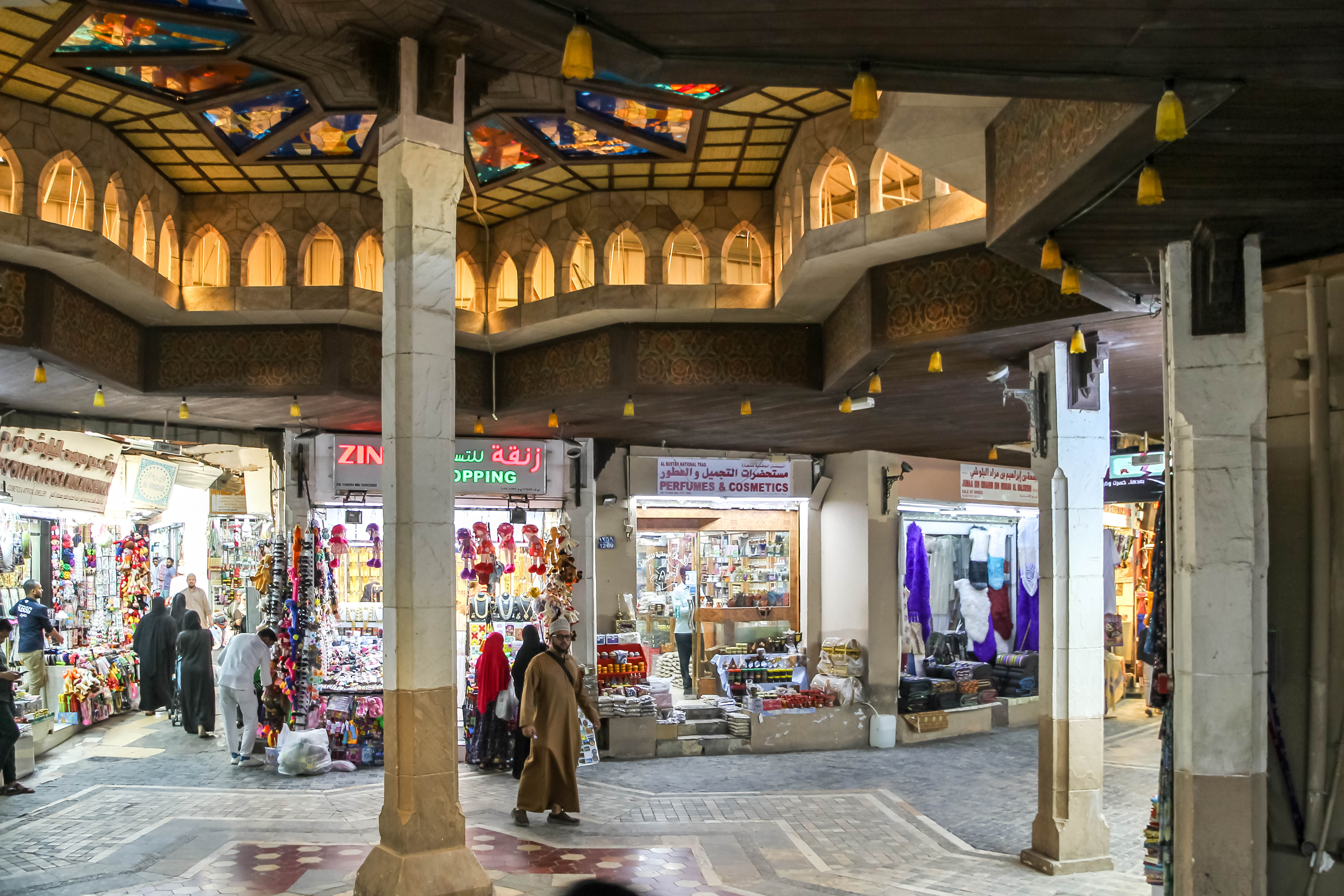
Muttrah Souq

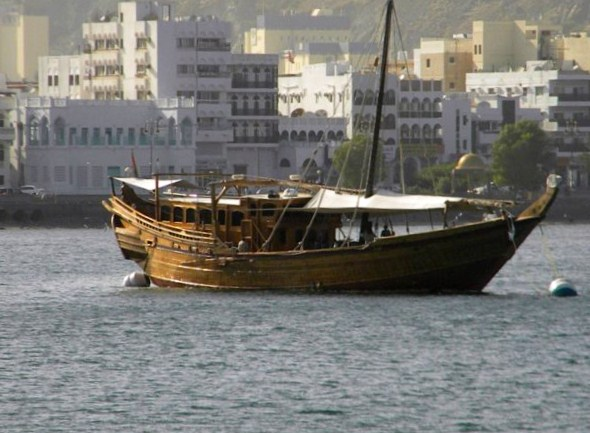
Muscat Harbor - A traditional Omani Dhow lies anchored in the Muscat Harbor (World's largest natural harbor)

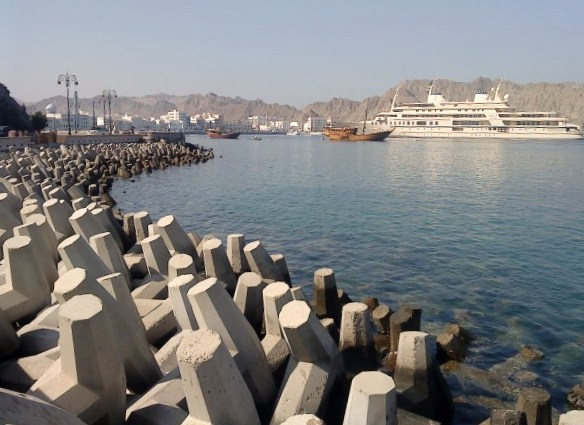
Muscat Port - The Sultan's Yacht can be seen anchored at the Port.

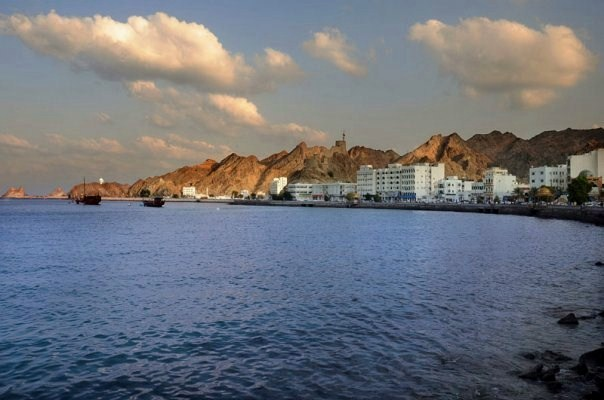
Mutrah Corniche

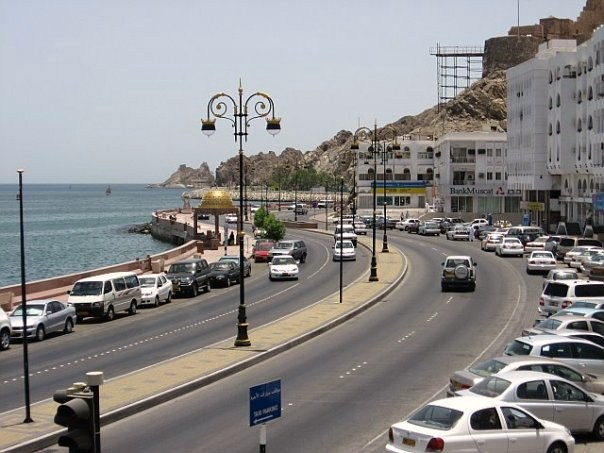
Mutrah Corniche

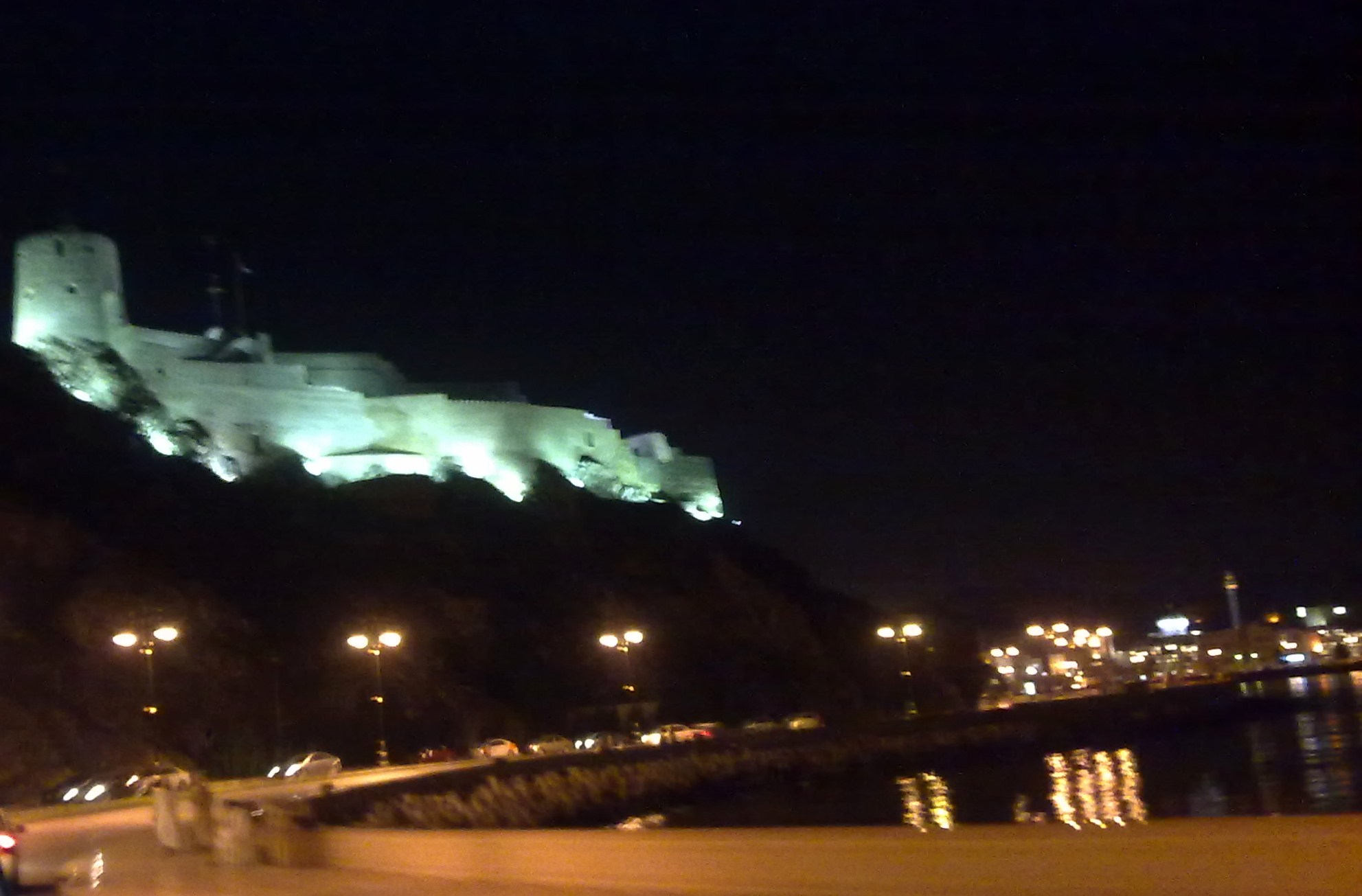
The Muscat Fort (Built by the Portuguese in the 16th century) overlooks the Muscat harbor, Mutrah and the Al Alam Palace

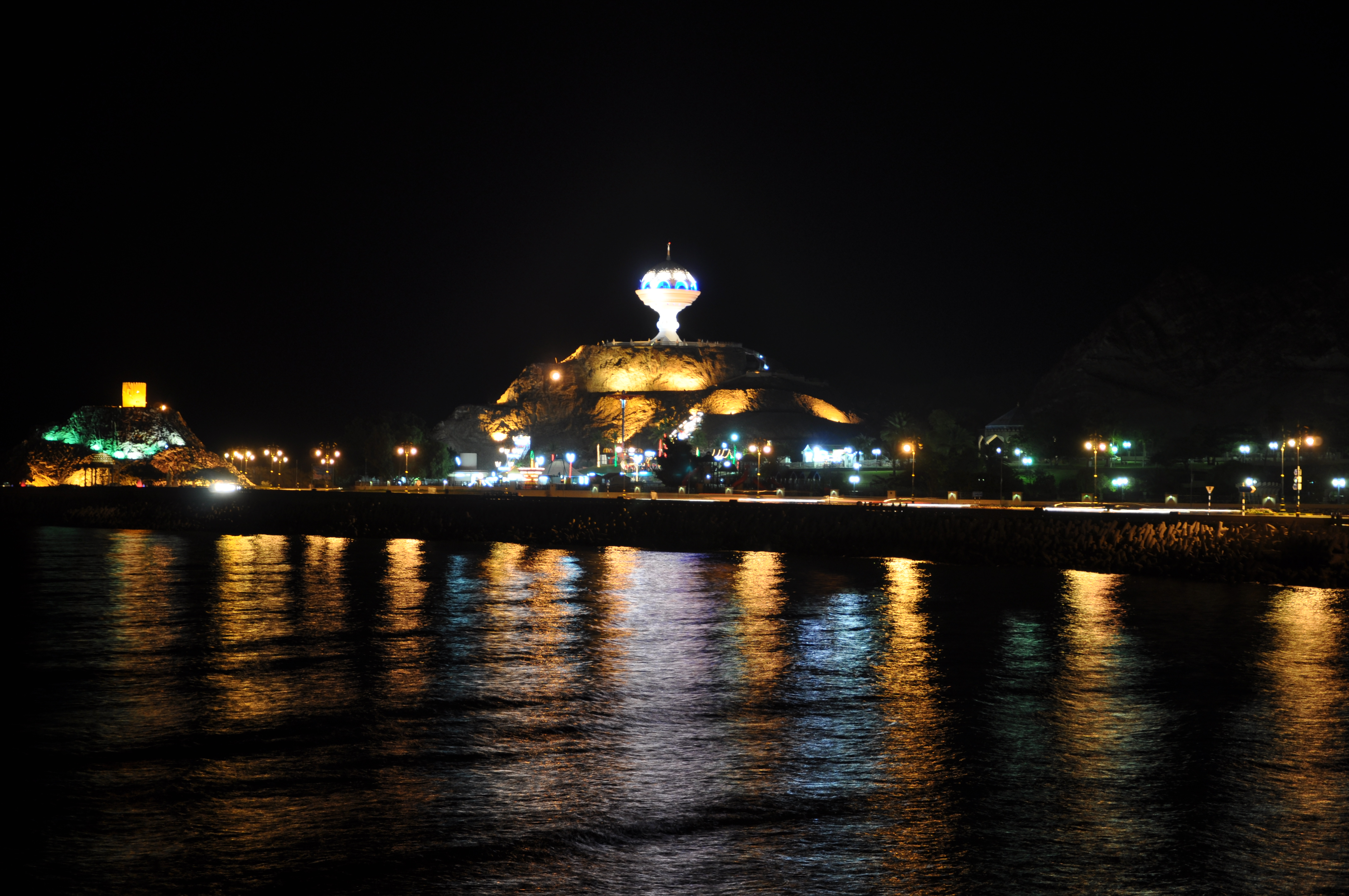
Riyam Park - as seen in Amazing Race 9 - is very near to the Muscat Harbor

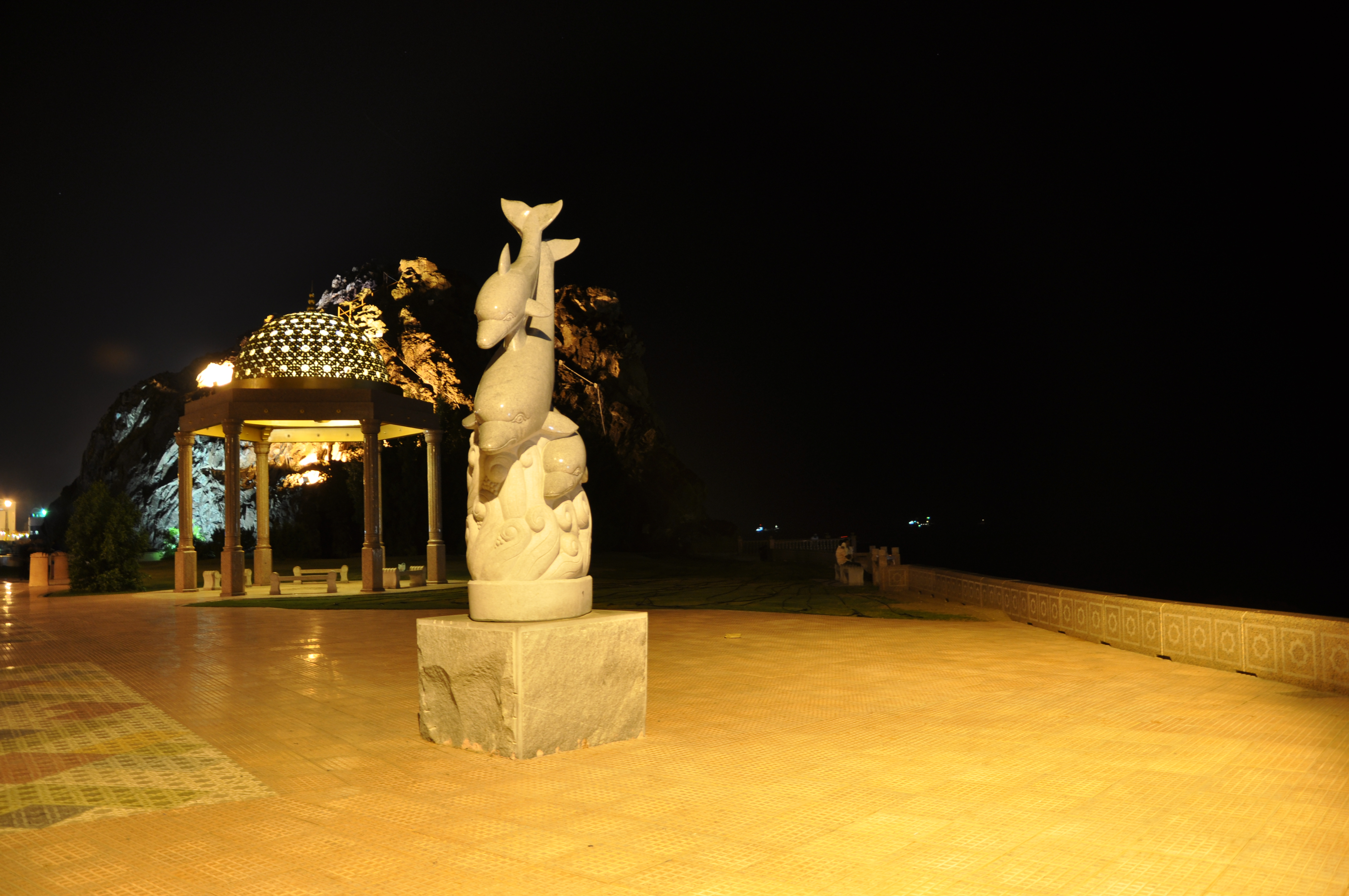
The Mutrah Corniche was renovated to undo the destruction done by Cyclone Gonu

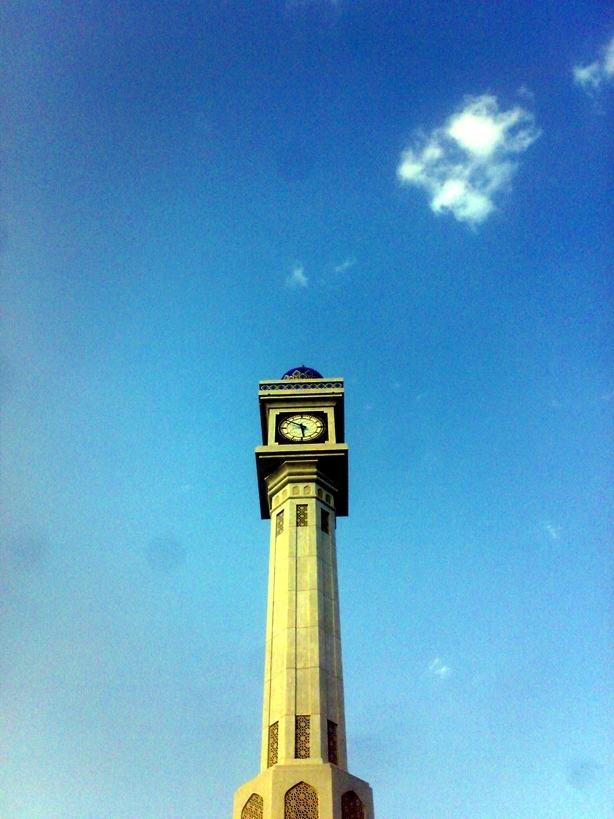
Muscat Clock Tower, MBD, Ruwi is the oldest Monument in Modern Oman and showcases the Sultanate’s commitment to modernization

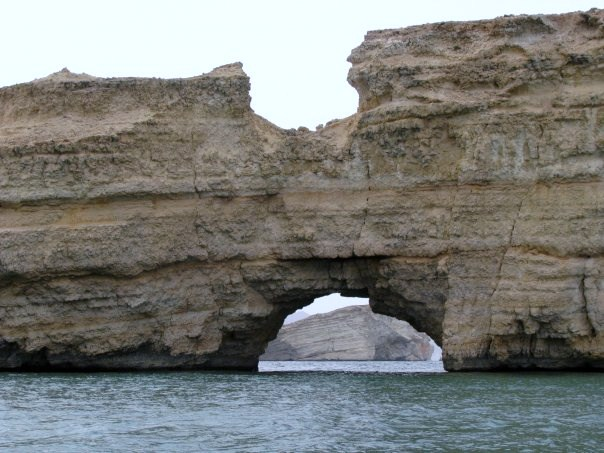
Beaches of Oman along with its cliffs attract tourists from all over the world

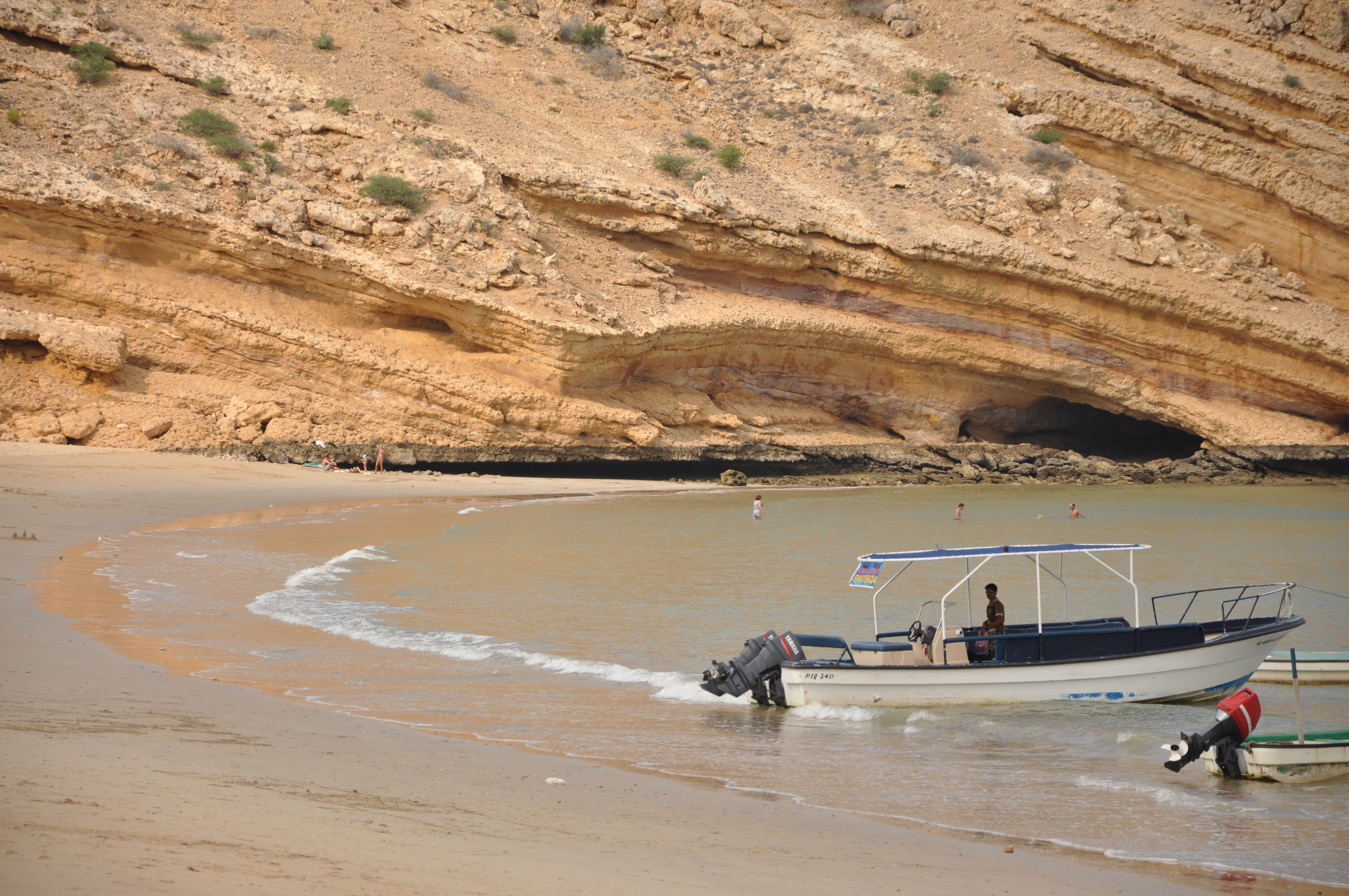
Qantab Beach

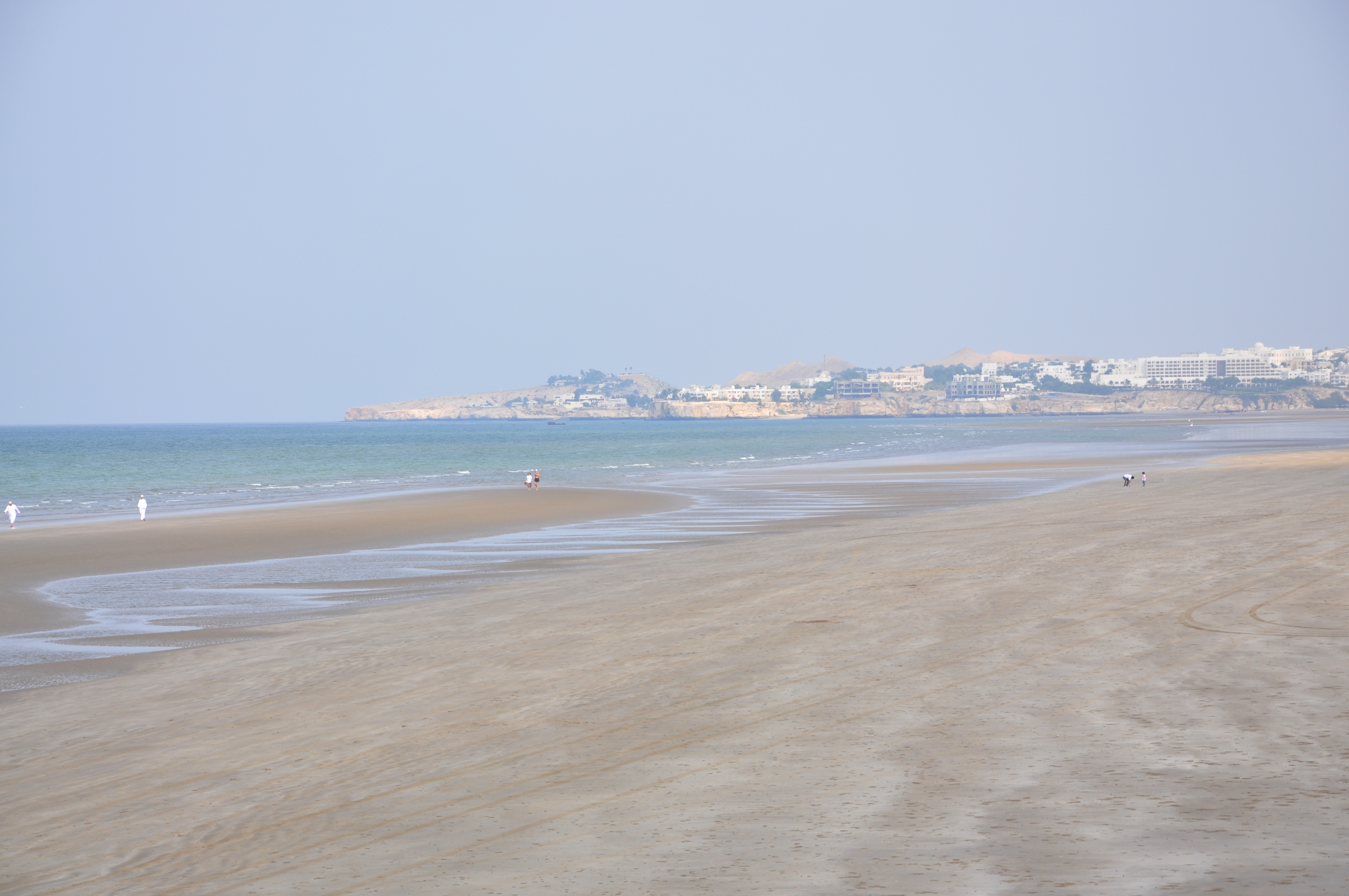
Qurum Beach – Crowne Plaza Muscat can be seen in the distance (on the cliff-top)

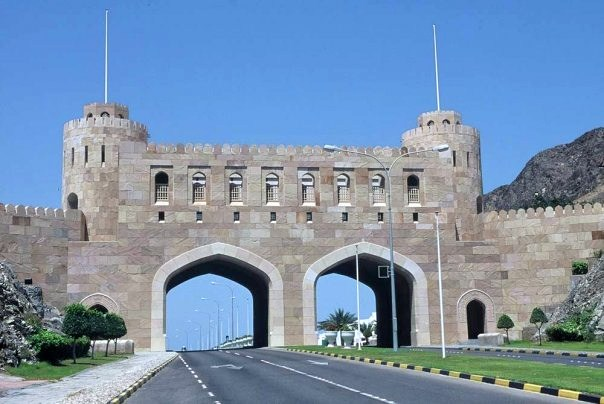
Muscat Municipality works continuously to beautify the city. Such gates dot roads around Muscat and showcase the traditional roots of the Sultanate

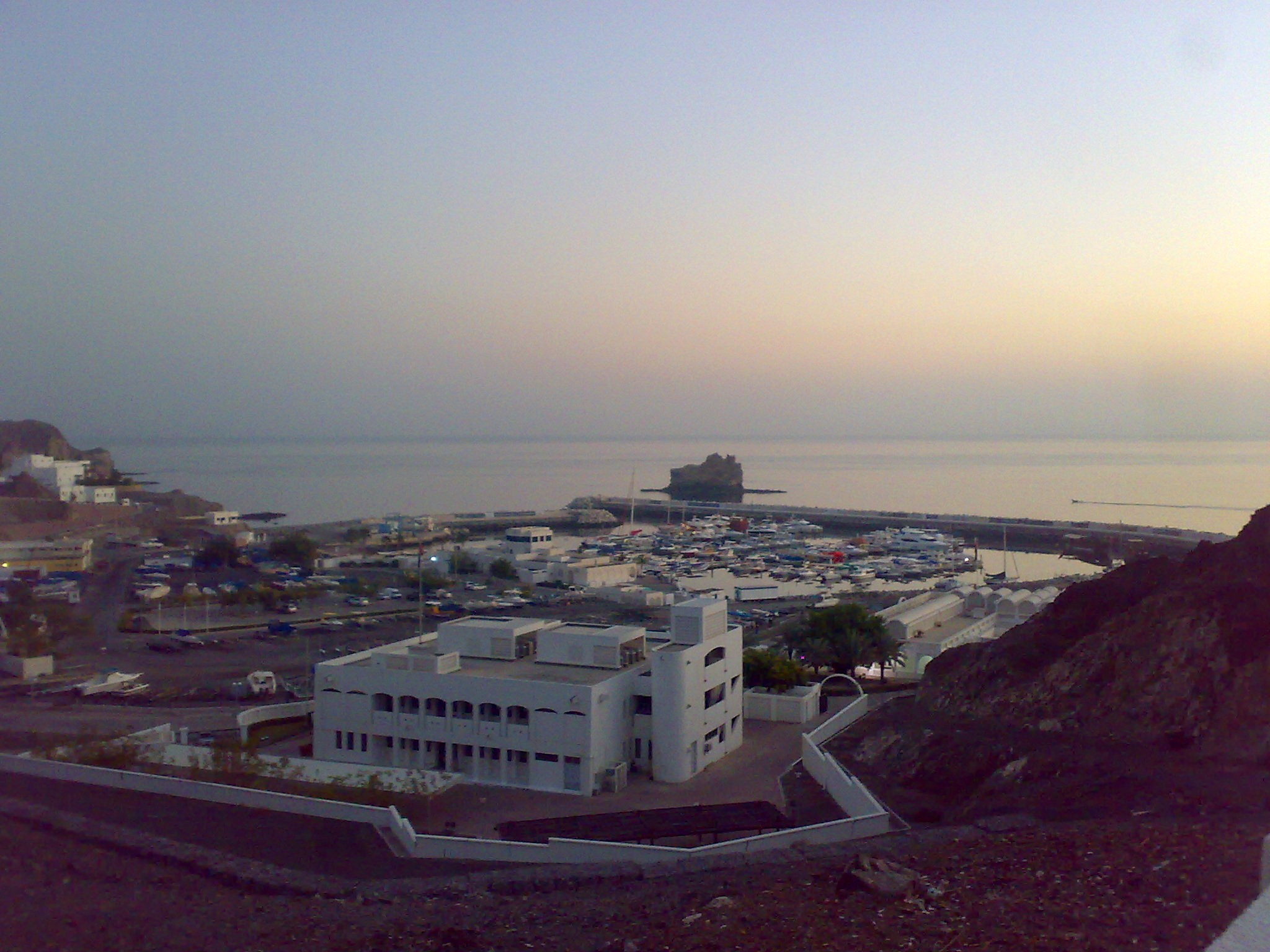
Muscat Boat Club

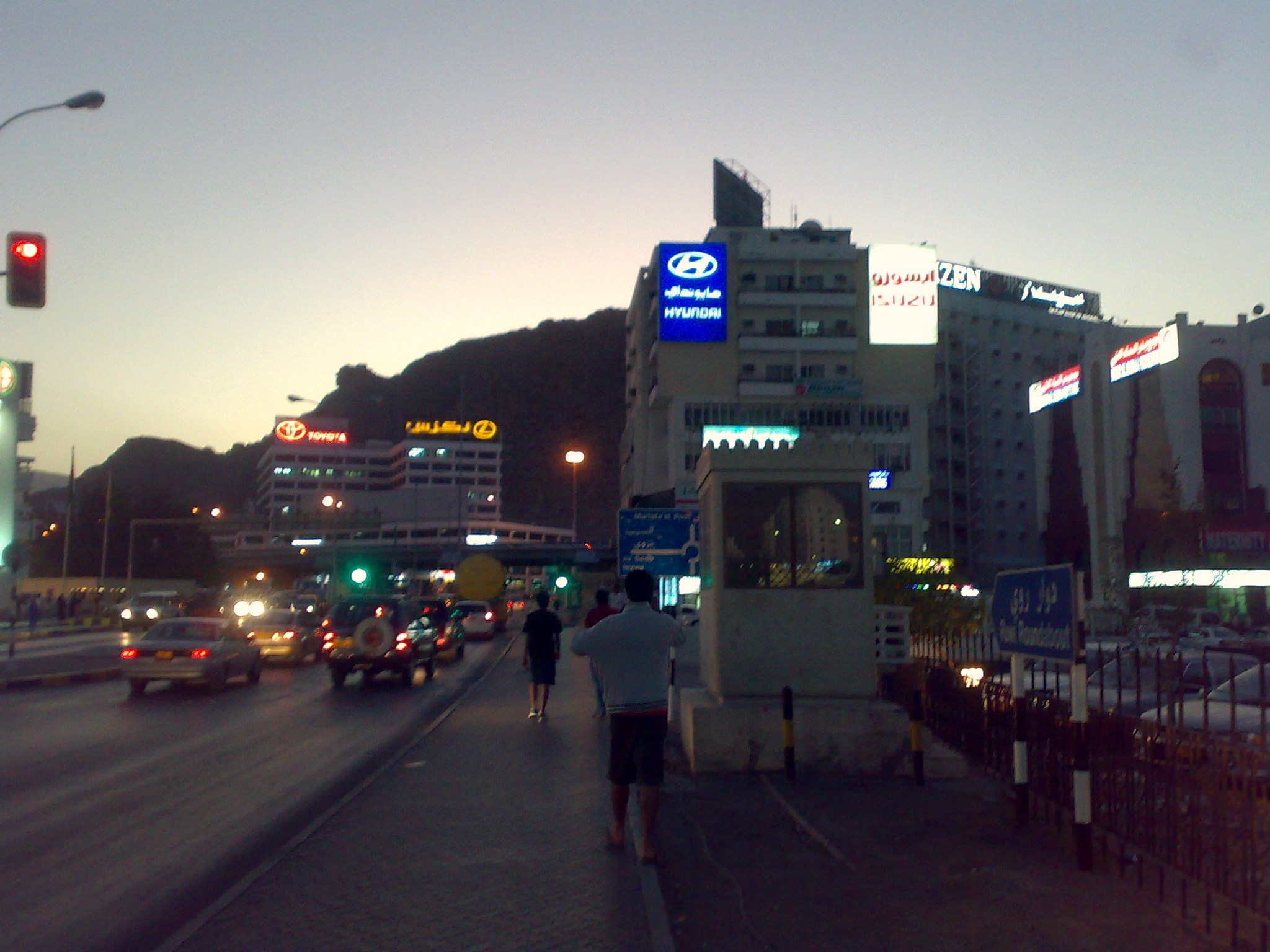
Ruwi - The Commercial hub of Muscat includes a massive marketplace - The Ruwi High Street

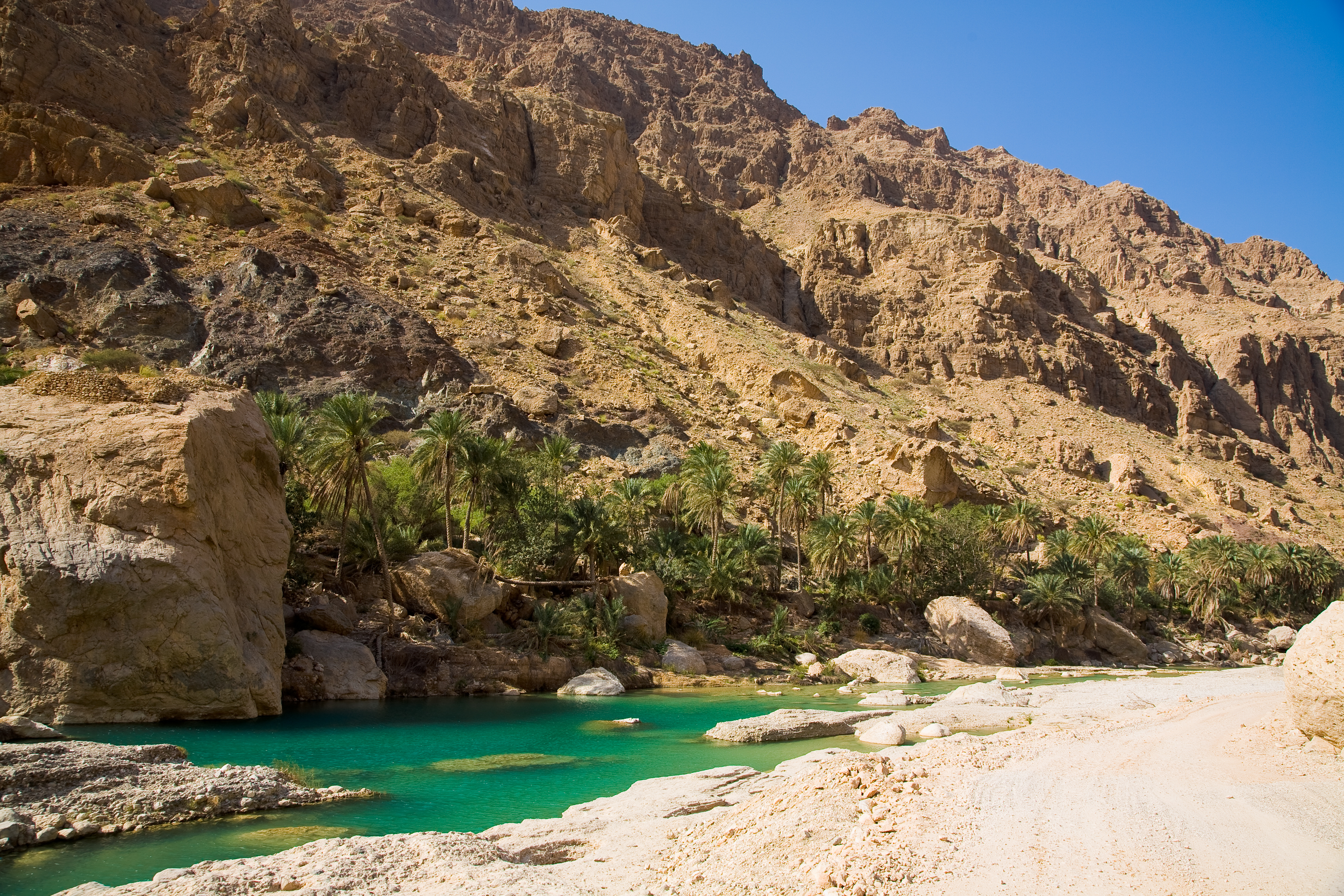
Wadi Tiwi

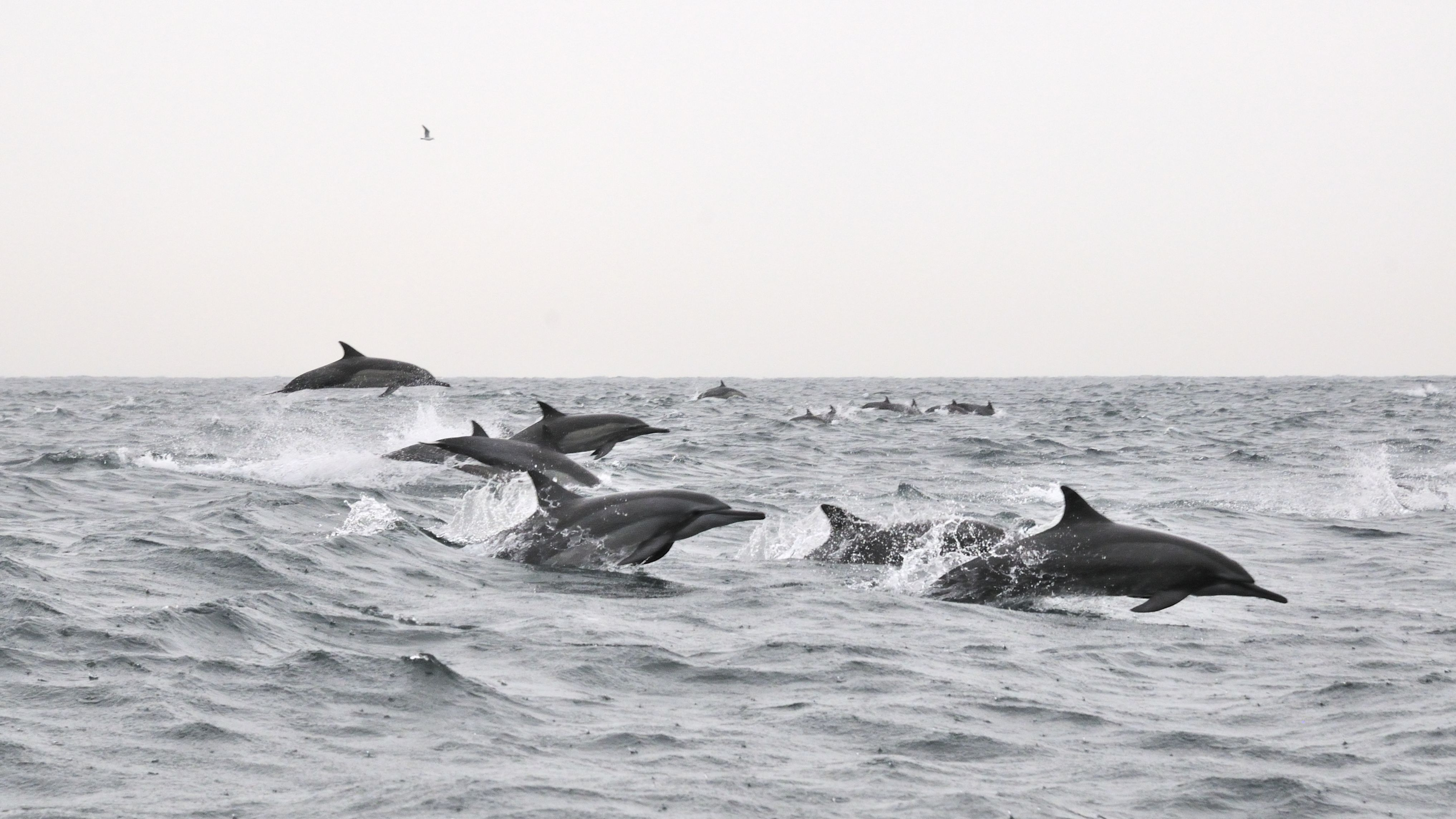
Watching spinner dolphins in the Gulf of Oman

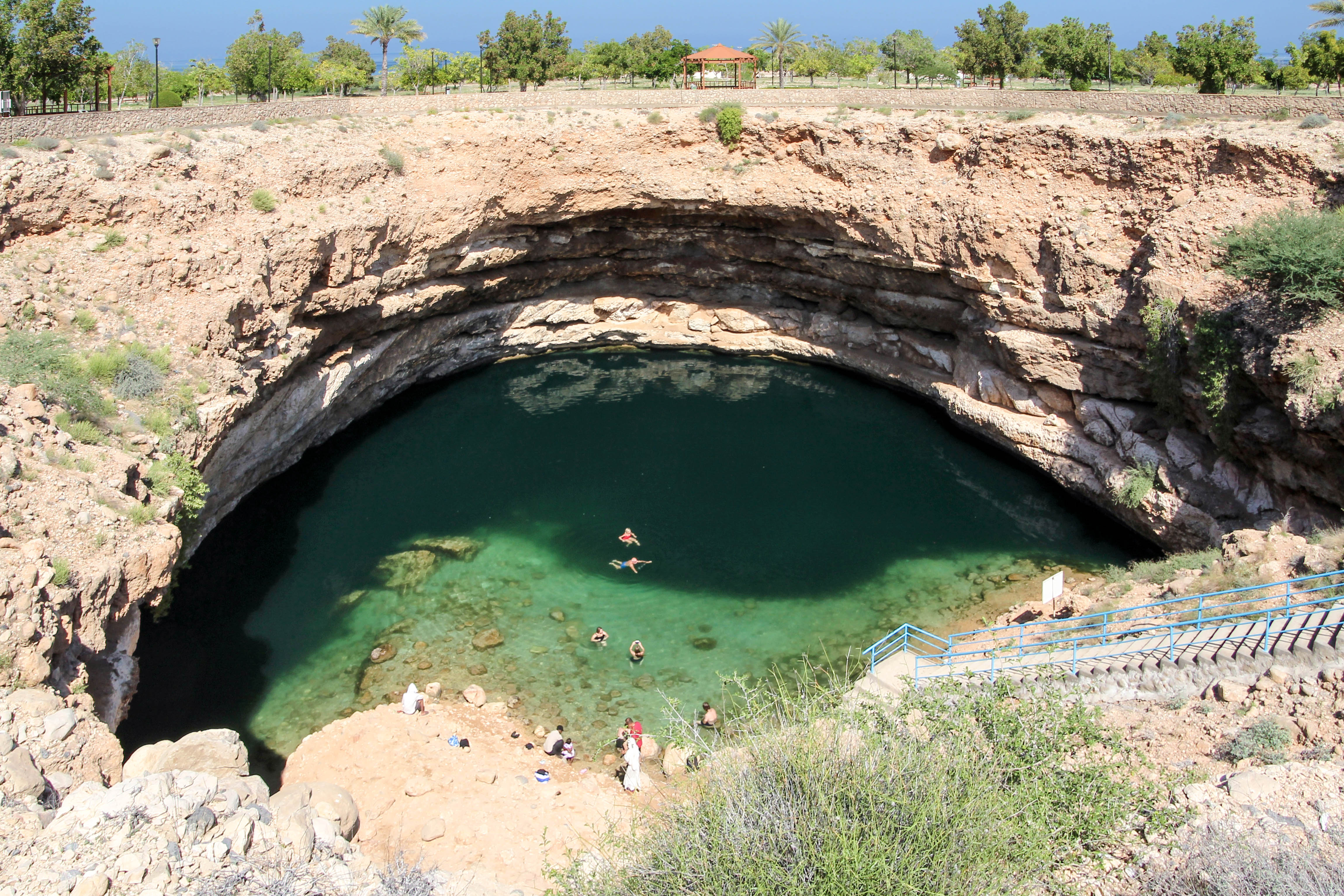
Bimmah Sinkhole

== See also ==
- Visa policy of Oman
- Al Alam Palace
- Cities in Oman
- Economy of Oman
- Geography of Oman
- Provinces of Oman
- Muscat
- Muttrah
- Nizwa
- Royal Opera House Muscat
- Salalah
- Shangri-La's Barr Al Jissah Resort & Spa
- Sohar
- Sur
