= Sardul Singh Guraya =

Indian biologist (1930–2012)

- Born: 12 October 1930; Kot Majlas, Punjab Province, British India
- Died: 8 July 2012 (aged 81)
- Education: Panjab University, Chandigarh; International University Foundation
- Known for: Evolutionary significance of reproductive processes
- Awards: 1973 Shanti Swarup Bhatnagar Prize; 1980 PAU Prize; 1985 M. S. Randhawa Award; 1990 ICMR Basanti Devi Amir Chand Prize
- Scientific career
- Fields: Reproductive physiology; Cell biology
- Workplaces: Gorakhpur University; Population Council; Council for Scientific and Industrial Research; Mohanlal Sukhadia University; Punjab Agricultural University

Sardul Singh Guraya (12 October 1930 – 8 July 2012) was an Indian biologist, known for his contributions in the fields of reproductive physiology and Developmental biology. He was an elected fellow of the Indian National Science Academy, National Academy of Sciences, India and National Academy of Agricultural Sciences. The Council of Scientific and Industrial Research, the apex agency of the Government of India for scientific research, awarded him the Shanti Swarup Bhatnagar Prize for Science and Technology, one of the highest Indian science awards, in 1973, for his contributions to biological sciences.

== Biography ==
Sardul Singh Guraya was born on 12 October 1930 to Banta Singh Guraya and Nihal Kaur at Kot Majlas village in Gurdaspur district of Punjab in British India. He graduated in science (BSc hons) in 1954 from Punjab University from where he also obtained his master's (MSc) and doctoral (PhD) degrees in 1956 and 1959 respectively and started his career as an assistant professor at Gorakhpur University in 1960. Two years later, he moved to the US and did his post doctoral studies at the Population Council from 1962 to 1964. Returning to India in 1965, he joined the Council of Scientific and Industrial Research as a pool officer and stayed at the council for one year till he returned to academics as the reader of Mohanlal Sukhadia University (then known as Udaipur University) in 1966. His next move was as a professor to Punjab Agricultural University in 1971 where he served out his career till his superannuation in 1992; in between, holding the positions of the dean of the College of Basic Sciences and Humanities and of the director of Advance Regional Research Center in Reproductive Biology (an Indian Council of Medical Research sponsored initiative) from 1982 to 1991. During the course of his career, he secured a Doctor Science degree from Punjab University, Chandigarh in 1971.

Guraya was married to Surinder Kaur and the couple had two sons and a daughter. He died on 8 July 2012, at the age of 81.

== Legacy ==
Guraya was known to have done pioneering research on genetical divergence of crops with different breeding systems which inaugurated a new school of thought on the subject. His studies dealt with the correlation between the structure and function of reproductive organs and elucidated its evolutionary aspects, with special emphasis on the ovarian and testicular compartments. His findings on the developmental traits of crops was reported to have assisted in crop improvement with regard to disease resistance, productivity and grain quality. He published his research findings in several articles (Note: While many of Guraya's articles are co-written, majority of his books are single-author publications (please see bibliography).) and over 10 books; PubMed, an online article repository has listed 215 of his articles. His body of work includes The Cell and Molecular Biology of Fish Oogenesis, Cellular and Molecular Biology of Gonadal Development and Maturation in Mammals: Fundamentals and Biomedical Implications, Comparative Cellular and Molecular Biology of Ovary in Mammals: Fundamental and Applied Aspects, Comparative Cellular and Molecular Biology of Testis in Vertebrates: Trends in Endocrine, Paracrine, and Autocrine Regulation of Structure and Functions, Cellular And Molecular Biology For Human, (all on Cell and Molecular biology), Biology of Spermatogenesis and Spermatozoa in Mammals, Biology of Spermatogenesis and Spermatozoa in Mammals, Buffalo bull semen: morphology, biochemistry, physiology and methodology (all on spermatogenesis) and Rodents: ecology, biology and control. He was associated with national and international organizations such as World Health Organization, UNESCO, Indian Council of Medical Research, Indian Council of Agricultural Research, Council of Scientific and Industrial Research and the University Grants Commission and served as the member of the council of Indian National Science Academy (INSA) from 1986 to 1988. He was also a member of the editorial boards of Journal of Biosciences, Himalayan Journal of Environment and Zoology and the journals of the INSA.

== Awards and honors ==
Guraya, who served as the national lecturer of the University Grants Commission from 1971 to 1976, was an emeritus scientist (1992–1996) and a professor emeritus (1996–2000) at the Council of Scientific and Industrial Research. He was awarded the Shanti Swarup Bhatnagar Prize, one of the highest Indian science awards, by the Council of Scientific and Industrial Research in 1973. He received the PAU Prize in 1980, followed by the M. S. Randhawa Award for Best Book in 1985 and the Basanti Devi Amir Chand Prize of Indian Council of Medical Research in 1990. An elected fellow of the National Academy of Sciences, India, he was elected as a fellow by the Indian Academy of Sciences in 1975 and by the Indian National Science Academy in 1980. He was also a fellow of the National Academy of Agricultural Sciences. His biography has been included in the volume 40 of the Biographical memoirs of fellows of the Indian National Science Academy, published by INSA in 2013.

== Selected bibliography ==
=== Books ===
- Kuldip Singh Sidhu; Sardul S. Guraya (1985). Buffalo bull semen: morphology, biochemistry, physiology and methodology. USG Publishers & Distributors.
- Sardul S. Guraya (1 January 1986). The Cell and Molecular Biology of Fish Oogenesis. Karger Medical and Scientific Publishers. ISBN 978-3-8055-4253-1.
- Sardul S. Guraya (1989). Ovarian follicles in reptiles and birds. Springer London, Limited. ISBN 978-3-540-50416-0.
- Girish Chopra; Patwant Kaur; Sardul S Guraya (1996). Rodents: ecology, biology and control. R. Chand.
- Sardul S. Guraya (1997). Ovarian Biology in Buffaloes and Cattle. Directorate of Information and Publication of Agriculture, Indian Council of Agricultural Research.
- Sardul S. Guraya (1998). Cellular and Molecular Biology of Gonadal Development and Maturation in Mammals: Fundamentals and Biomedical Implications. Springer-Verlag. ISBN 978-3-540-63690-8.
- Sardul S. Guraya (1 January 1999). Comparative Testicular Biology in Animals: Structure, Functions, and Intercellular Communication. Science Publishers. ISBN 978-1-57808-066-3.
- Sardul S. Guraya (1 January 2000). Comparative Cellular and Molecular Biology of Ovary in Mammals: Fundamental and Applied Aspects. Science Publishers. ISBN 978-1-57808-127-1.
- Sardul S. Guraya (1 January 2001). Comparative Cellular and Molecular Biology of Testis in Vertebrates: Trends in Endocrine, Paracrine, and Autocrine Regulation of Structure and Functions. Science Publishers. ISBN 978-1-57808-165-3.
- Sardul S. Guraya (1 January 2007). Cellular And Molecular Biology For Human. New Age International. ISBN 978-81-224-1968-9.
- Sardul S Guraya (2011). Comparative Cellular and Molecular Biology in Ovary in Amphibians. IK International Publishing House. p. 132. ISBN 9789381141069.
- Sardul S. Guraya (6 December 2011). Biology of Spermatogenesis and Spermatozoa in Mammals. Springer Berlin Heidelberg. ISBN 978-3-642-71639-3.

=== Articles ===
- Sardul Singh Guraya (1961). "Lipids in the Human Oocyte". Journal of Microscopical Science. 102 (3): 381–385.
- Guraya S. S., Dhanju C. K. (November 1992). "Mechanism of ovulation--an overview". Indian J Exp Biol. 30 (11): 958–967. PMID 1293040.
- Sidhu K. S., Guraya S. S. (January 1993). "Effect of calmodulin-like protein from buffalo (Bubalus bubalis) seminal plasma on Ca2+, Mg(2+)-ATPase of purified plasma membrane of buffalo spermatozoa". Andrologia. 25 (1): 25–28. doi:10.1111/j.1439-0272.1993.tb02677.x. PMID 8427418. S2CID 39943840.
- Kaur J.; Guraya S. S.; Sidhu K. S. (February 1994). "Effect of LH and estradiol on in vitro maturation of hamster follicular oocytes". Indian J Exp Biol. 32 (2): 44–45. PMID 8045614.
- Dhindsa J. S.; Sidhu K. S.; Guraya S. S. (September 1995). "Induction of buffalo (Bubalus bubalis ) sperm capacitation and acrosome reaction in the excised reproductive tract of hamsters". Theriogenology. 44 (4): 599–608. doi:10.1016/0093-691x(95)00230-6. PMID 16727757.
- Sharma R. K., Guraya S. S. (November 1997). "Atropine and testosterone propionate induced atretic changes in granulosa cells of house rat (Rattus rattus) ovary". Indian J Exp Biol. 35 (11): 1166–1169. PMID 9567743.

== See also ==
- Deen Dayal Upadhyay Gorakhpur University
- Panjab University
