= Al Hamra, Oman =

Al Hamra ٱلْحَمْرَاء (in Arabic)
- Town
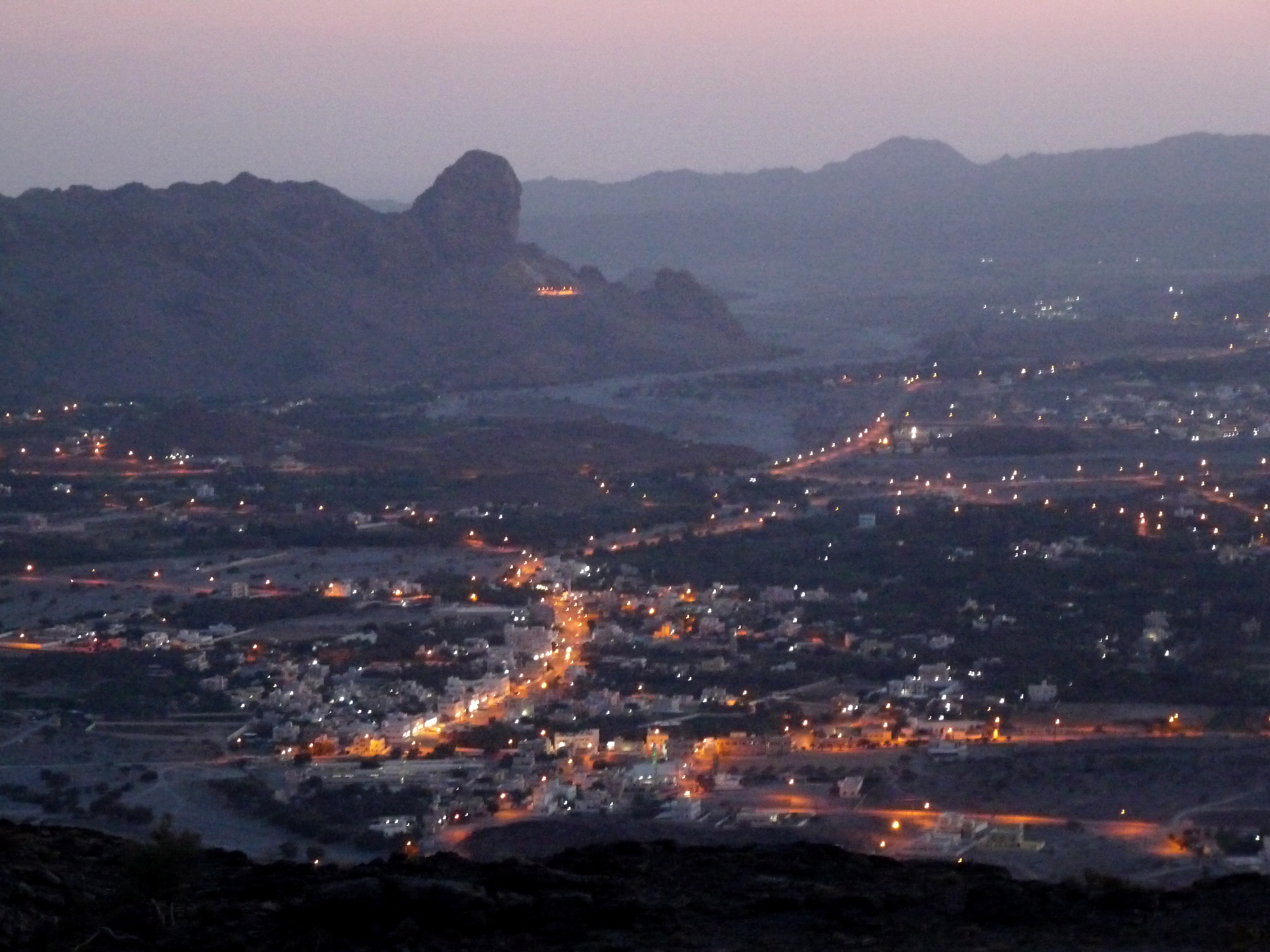
- Al-Hamra sunset, with the Central Hajar Mountains in the background

- Location in Oman
- Coordinates: 23°07′00″N 57°17′35″E
- Country: Oman
- Governorate: Ad Dakhiliyah Region
- Elevation: 2,139 ft (652 m)
- Time zone: UTC+4 (+4)

Al Hamra (Arabic: ٱلْحَمْرَاء, romanized: Al-Ḥamrāʾ) is a 400-year-old town in the region Ad Dakhiliyah, in northeastern Oman. As a province (wilayat), it is home to a number of villages including the mountainside village of Misfat Al Abryeen, with the village of Ghul to the northwest of the town, and Bimah to the north-northeast. The town and province lie on the southern slopes of the Akhdar Mountains.

Al Hamra is also known as Hamra Al Abryeen with reference to the Al Abri tribe who live there. Near the center of the town is a plaza and the souq. Some of the oldest preserved houses in Oman can be found in Al Hamra, a town built on a tilted rock slab. Many of the houses have two, three and even four stories, with ceilings made of palm beams and fronds topped by mud and straw. Visitors to the nearby souq can watch a halwa maker at work in the only halwa shop still operating in the old souq.

Mount Shams (the sun mountain), the highest mountain in Oman, sits northeast of the town of Al Hamra. Al Hoota Cave, one of the largest cave systems in the world, is located at the foot of Mount Shams.

== History ==
During the rule of Imam Saif bin Sultan, the fourth ruler of the Yaruba dynasty, Al Hamra was settled in the late 17th century by the Al Abri tribe. Notable for a number of Yemeni-style, mud-brick buildings, many of its houses have been abandoned due to its inhabitants moving into modern buildings.

Before the year 1066 AH, the province of Al-Hamra was composed of scattered ancient villages and scattered oases known as the Kadam region. This is how Sheikh Ibrahim bin Saeed Al-Abri, the former Mufti of the Sultanate, described it as the area located north of Bahla to the foothills of the Green Mountain. It included several villages, including Bilad Sit, Al-Hamra, Al-Qarya, Al-Qal'a, Al-Arid, and Dhath Khayl.

However, after the aforementioned date, the people of Al-Hamra collaborated with the Ya'arabah tribe. Sheikh Ibrahim bin Saeed Al-Abri mentioned in his statement: "As we mentioned earlier, these people are from the people of the Mafsah region, because the land of Al-Hamra was not inhabited and did not have a river until the year 1066 AH, as I saw in the writings of Sheikh Rashid bin Raja Al-Abri. Imam Sultan bin Saeed bin Malik Al-Ya'arabi and his followers, the Al-Abri people, started working on the Falaj Al-Hamra in the first month of Jumada Al-Akhirah in the year 1066 AH. However, he did not mention the exact time when its water flowed. We heard from the scholars that its service was gradual, and at that time, its water used to dry up at the first location in this area. The work is still ongoing until its water flowed during the days of Sheikh Malik bin Rashid in the early 13th century. This flowing water is known as Al-Kiyumi's freedom because it flowed by the hand of a man from the Al-Kiyumi tribe. A flowing water is a spring that emerges from the ground or mountains, whether small or large. It became a partnership for the Ya'arabah tribe in Al-Hamra until the time of Imam Bal'arab bin Humair and Sayyid Sultan, the son of Imam Mahna bin Sultan. Then they sold all their shares in the year 1155 AH and 1257 AH.

== Geography ==
=== Caves ===
==== Hoota Cave ====
It is the second largest cave in the Sultanate of Oman after Majlis Al Jinn cave in the Quriyat Governorate. The cave is named Hoota after the nearby village. It is located approximately 10 kilometers from the center of the governorate. The journey inside the cave begins with a train ride, taking visitors from the reception area on a five-minute journey through mountainous and valley landscapes to the mouth of the cave. After that, the journey continues on foot in a circular route until exiting through the same entrance.

==== Al Khud Cave, Harf Al Qana Cave, and Ghweir Al Tain Cave ====
Media outlets have reported that the Omani cave exploration team has successfully explored three caves in the village of Misfat Al Abriyeen in the Al Hamra Governorate, one of which has never been descended into before. These caves are known by the locals of Misfat Al Abriyeen as Al Khud Cave, Harf Al Qana Cave, and Ghweir Al Tain Cave. The team is currently surveying these caves to produce accurate geological maps and various cross-sections that show the details of the cave passages and formations present in them."

"Harf Al Qana Cave and Ghweir Al Tain Cave have vertical depths exceeding 100 meters underground, requiring the use of long ropes and expertise in climbing and descending on ropes to access them. They extend for a total of more than 500 meters in a southerly direction along the rock formations. These two caves are abundant in water pools, narrow passages, and slopes. According to the local page, Harf Al Qana Cave was previously known and descended into by three foreigners in the 1980s, about thirty years ago for the first time, and they named it Hell Cave due to its high temperature and humidity. On the other hand, Ghweir Al Tain Cave is a new discovery by the Omani cave exploration team. The third cave is known as Al Khud Cave, and it is named after the abundant bat droppings found in the cave. The people of Misfat Al Abriyeen used these droppings as fertilizer for the soil, hence the cave was named after them.

==== Cave Al-Fayakeen ====
It is characterized by its dark and narrow entrance, with beautiful geological formations inside that reach a height of 15 meters. The heights vary from one part to another, and in some places, entry requires crawling on hands and knees.

==== Cave Katta Al-Suwayrat in Hail Al-Shush ====
In Cave Katta Al-Suwayrat, there are three main areas that require the use of ropes, tools, and specialized equipment to descend due to the nature of the cave and its difficult and slippery passages. Extreme caution and professional handling are essential in this aspect. The first main area is located at the beginning of the cave, with a depth of about 80 meters. The second area is directly after the first, at a depth of approximately 30 meters. The third area is located about 200 meters away and has a depth of 12 meters. Entering Cave Katta Al-Suwayrat requires complete knowledge and expertise in cave descent techniques, as well as compliance with safety requirements and proficiency in using ropes, tools, and specialized equipment for descent operations. It also requires a high level of physical fitness and the presence of a complete team. Cave Katta Al-Suwayrat ends with a water lake adjacent to the cave's ceiling.

=== Valleys ===
The valleys in Al-Hamra Governorate are considered a wonderful natural addition and contain many geological beauties. Al-Sheikh Mohsen bin Zahrani Al-Abri Public Library, in cooperation with the Omani Geological Society, visited and explored Wadi Al-Madaam. A group of people walked from the bottom of the valley to the top and discovered many fossilized shells and ancient drawings. The area also contains the Al-Fayakeen Cave, which has drawings and a large space.

Dr. Mohammed bin Hilal Al Kindi, a member of the Omani Geological Society and an expert in geology, says that the Omani Geological Society appreciates the initiative of Sheikh Mohsen bin Zahran Al Abri Public Library in documenting and monitoring the mountain caves in Al Hamra Governorate. Through the collaboration between the Omani Geological Society and other institutions that aim to discover and document geological findings, support was provided to this initiative by exploring the depths of Al Faiqeen Cave in Al Hamra Governorate, with the participation of members of the society and adventure enthusiasts who enjoy mountain climbing and cave exploration. The mountain rocks in Oman are composed of a type of rock called "Niteh," which is a hard and natural rock that is usually found deep within the ground where petroleum is formed. Its approximate age is 100 million years. The cave was documented from the inside using photographs for easy presentation. There are also plans to explore other valleys and canyons formed by divine power, such as Wadi Ghoul, Wadi Al Nakhur, Wadi Al Salawat, Wadi Mokhal, Wadi Al Abri, Wadi Sha'ma, Wadi Al Malah, Wadi Al Mada'am, Wadi Al Khor, Wadi Al Sileel or Al Manibik, Wadi Dufia, and Wadi Al Awar.

=== Climate ===
Climate data for Al-Hamra
Month	Jan	Feb	Mar	Apr	May	Jun	Jul	Aug	Sep	Oct	Nov	Dec	Year
Mean daily maximum °C (°F)	21.7 (71.1)	22.3 (72.1)	25.6 (78.1)	30.7 (87.3)	34.8 (94.6)	36.4 (97.5)	34.7 (94.5)	33.4 (92.1)	32.4 (90.3)	30.3 (86.5)	26.0 (78.8)	22.8 (73.0)	29.3 (84.7)
Mean daily minimum °C (°F)	11.9 (53.4)	13.1 (55.6)	16.2 (61.2)	19.9 (67.8)	23.7 (74.7)	25.6 (78.1)	25.4 (77.7)	24.4 (75.9)	22.7 (72.9)	19.5 (67.1)	15.3 (59.5)	13.2 (55.8)	19.2 (66.6)
Average precipitation mm (inches)	7 (0.3)	34 (1.3)	23 (0.9)	13 (0.5)	6 (0.2)	3 (0.1)	5 (0.2)	8 (0.3)	3 (0.1)	0 (0)	5 (0.2)	7 (0.3)	114 (4.5)
Source: Climate-data.org

== Attraction ==
=== Masfata Al-Abrayeen ===
It is an ancient village situated on a hill, with old mud houses and numerous farms. Additionally, there are irrigation canals that water people's farms with tannins. Currently, there are a number of restaurants and cafes that offer a unique tourist experience for visitors.

=== Al-Hara Al-Qadima ===
It is an old village built with mud, straw, and wood. Many TV series have been filmed in this village, and it contains houses such as Bayt Al-Maghri and Bayt Al-Safah, which has an exhibition showcasing old Omani life. It also has the Bait Al-Jabal Museum, established by a young Omani resident of the region.

=== Jebel Shams ===
It is one of the highest peaks in the Arabian Peninsula, reaching an elevation of 3000 meters above sea level. It has a camping and hiking center, as well as several small villages inhabited by the residents of Jebel Shams.

=== Hoota Cave ===
It is a cave that extends five kilometers into the eastern mountain. It contains limestone rocks that have formed beautiful and magnificent shapes over thousands of years. It also has a pool with blind fish that use waves to navigate.

=== Birkat Al-Sharaf ===
It is a water pool where people used to water their livestock. In that area, there is also the Hoota Cave Rest Area, which has several rooms for rent.

=== Bani Sabah Village ===
It is one of the most important villages in the Al-Hamra region. It is named after the Bani Sabah tribe, which has inhabited the village for a long time. Its people are known for their kindness, generosity, and love for others. Therefore, several tribes, such as Al-Na'ab and Al-Hattatlah, have settled in the village and the Ghawj area. It is also considered the main gateway to the tourist areas in Jebel Hat.

=== Al-Musalhah Castle ===
It is one of the places frequently visited by tourists due to its charm and heritage.

=== Hail Al-Shash ===
Located in the mountains of Al-Hamra, it is about one kilometer above the city of Al-Hamra. It offers a panoramic view of all the villages in Al-Hamra, parts of Bahla and Nizwa.

=== Bin Sult Rock ===
It is one of the historical landmarks and monuments that distinguish this region. It stands tall in the middle of Wadi Al-Khoud, where the waters of Al-Hamra's valleys converge. What distinguishes this rock is its large, semi-circular shape, rising about three meters above the valley floor, surrounded by ghaf, sidr, and arak trees from three sides.
