= Umma (disambiguation) =

Umma is an ancient city in Sumer.

Umma or UMMA may also refer to:

- Umma (1960 film), an Indian Malayalam-language film
- Umma (2022 film), an American supernatural horror film starring Sandra Oh
- Ummah, an Arabic word meaning community or nation
- Umma (damselfly), a genus of damselflies
- University of Michigan Museum of Art
- Several political parties are called Umma Party

== See also ==
- Ummah (disambiguation)
- Ooma, American telecommunications company
