= Majlesi =

Majlesi (Persian: مجلسی) may refer to:

- Majlesi, Isfahan, a city in Mobarakeh County, Iran
- Islamic Azad University of Majlesi, one of the branches of Islamic Azad University, located in Shahrak-e Majlesi
- Mohammad Taqi Majlesi (1594-1660), Majlesi-ye Awwal— Majlesi the First, an Islamic cleric during the Safavid era
- Mohammad-Baqer Majlesi (1627–1699), Iranian Twelver Shi'a cleric during the Safavid era

== See also ==
- Majlis (disambiguation)
