= Ummah (disambiguation) =

Ummah is the Muslim world.

Ummah may also refer to:

- The Ummah, a music-production collective
- Ummah Foods, a food manufacturer of the United Kingdom

== See also ==
- Umma (disambiguation)
- Ummat (disambiguation)
- Majlis Al-Umma (disambiguation)
- My Ummah, album by Sami Yusuf
