= Umma Party =

Umma Party is the name for some political parties in Africa and the Middle East, and may refer to:

- Umma Party (Egypt)
- Umma Party (Sudan)
- Umma Party (Zanzibar)
- Umma Islamic Party, in Saudi Arabia

== See also ==
- Umma (disambiguation)
