= Ghul, Oman =

Ghul
- Abandoned village
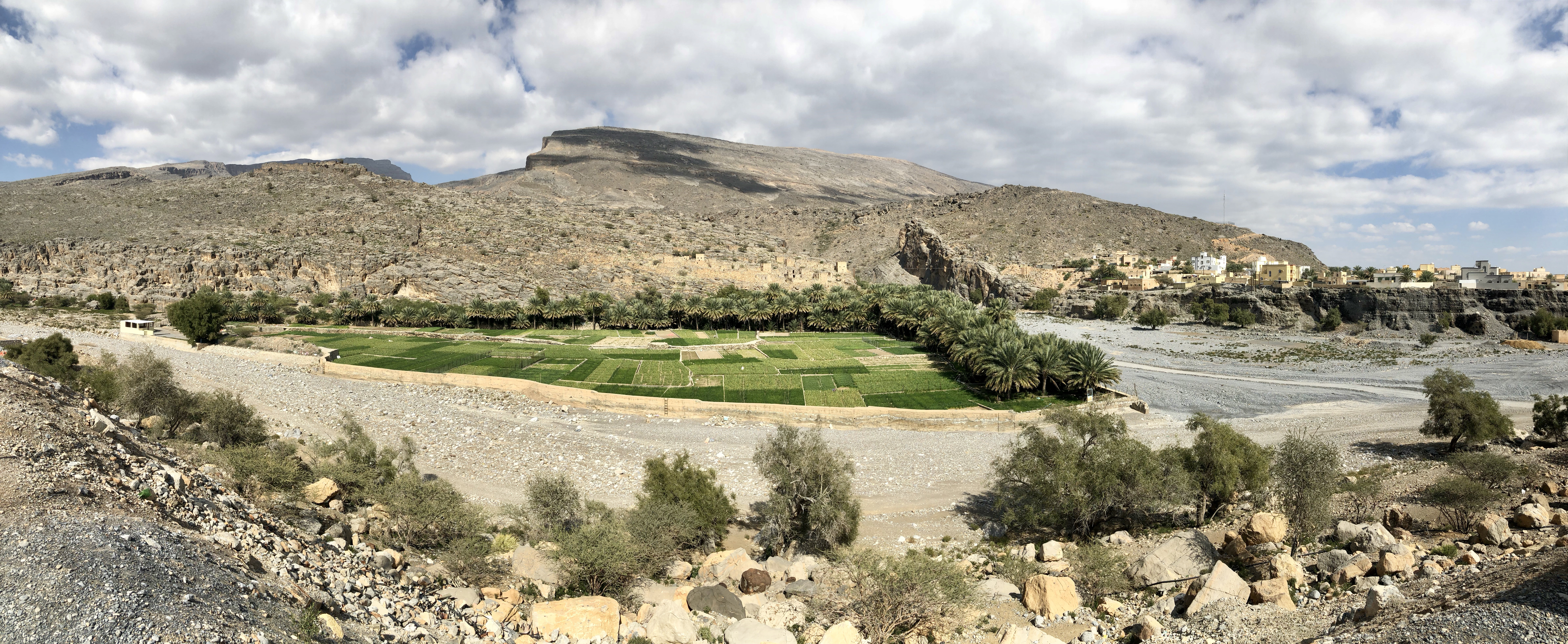
- Ghul, Oman

- Location in Oman
- Coordinates: 23°08′56″N 57°12′32″E
- Country: Oman
- Governorate: Ad Dakhiliyah Region
- Time zone: UTC+4 (+4)

Ghul or Wadi Ghul is an abandoned village, located to the northwest of Al Hamra in Oman. The area is referred to as the "Omani Grand Canyon" or "The Grand Canyon of Arabia". It is near Jebel Shams, the highest mountain peak in Oman.
