= Assembly of Deputies =

Assembly of Deputies may refer to:

- Assembly of Deputies of the Nenets Autonomous Okrug, regional parliament of Russia
- Chamber of Deputies of the Czech Republic, lower chamber of the bicameral Parliament of the Czech Republic
- Chamber of Deputies (Tunisia)

== See also ==
- Majlis al-Nuwwab (disambiguation)
