= Ummat =

Ummat may refer to:

- Ummah, the Muslim world
- Ummat (Pakistan), newspaper in Pakistan

== See also ==
- Ummah (disambiguation)
