= Majlis al-Nuwwab =

Majlis al-Nuwwab (Arabic: مجلس النواب), lit. 'Assembly of Deputies', is used in a number of countries as the Arabic-language name for the lower, directly elected house of a bicameral legislature. As a closer parallel to the idea of representative democracy, it is usually contrasted against the Majlis al-Shura (lit. 'Council of Consultants', usually more associated with non-legislative assemblies of advisors to a ruler or, more recently, the upper houses of bicameral parliaments).

The word is used as the official name of the following:

- House of Representatives (Jordan)
- Council of Representatives (Bahrain)
- House of Representatives (Yemen)
- Parliament of Lebanon (also known as the National Assembly)
- Chamber of Deputies (Tunisia)
- Council of Representatives of Iraq
- House of Representatives (Morocco)

== See also ==
- Assembly of Deputies (disambiguation)
- Majlis (disambiguation)
- Majlis Al-Umma (disambiguation)
- Majlis al-Shura (disambiguation)
