= Majlis al-Shura (disambiguation) =

Majlis al-Shura is an Islamic advisory council.

Majlis al Shura may also refer to:

- Consultative Assembly (Oman), lower house of the Council of Oman
- Consultative Assembly of Qatar
- Consultative Assembly of Saudi Arabia
- Consultative Council (Bahrain), upper house of National Assembly (Bahrain)
- Islamic Consultative Assembly, legislative body of Iran
- Legislative Council of Brunei, Brunei's legislative body
- Majlis al-Shura (Hamas), consultative council of Hamas
- Majlis-e-Shura of Darul Uloom Deoband, the Islamic seminary in Uttar Pradesh, India
- Parliament of Pakistan, Pakistan's legislative body
- Senate (Egypt), upper house of the Parliament of Egypt
- Shura council (Islamic Movement), consultative council of Islamic Movement in Israel

== See also ==
- Majlis (disambiguation)
- Majlis al-Nuwwab (disambiguation)
- Majlis Al-Umma (disambiguation)
