= Majlis Al-Umma =

Majlis al-Umma may refer to:

- Parliament of Jordan, the legislature of Jordan
- National Assembly (Kuwait), the legislature of Kuwait

== See also ==
- Majlis (disambiguation)
- Ummah (disambiguation)
- Majlis al-Nuwwab (disambiguation)
- Majlis al-Shura (disambiguation)
