= Al Hoota Cave =

Cave in Oman

- كَهْف ٱلْهُوْتَة
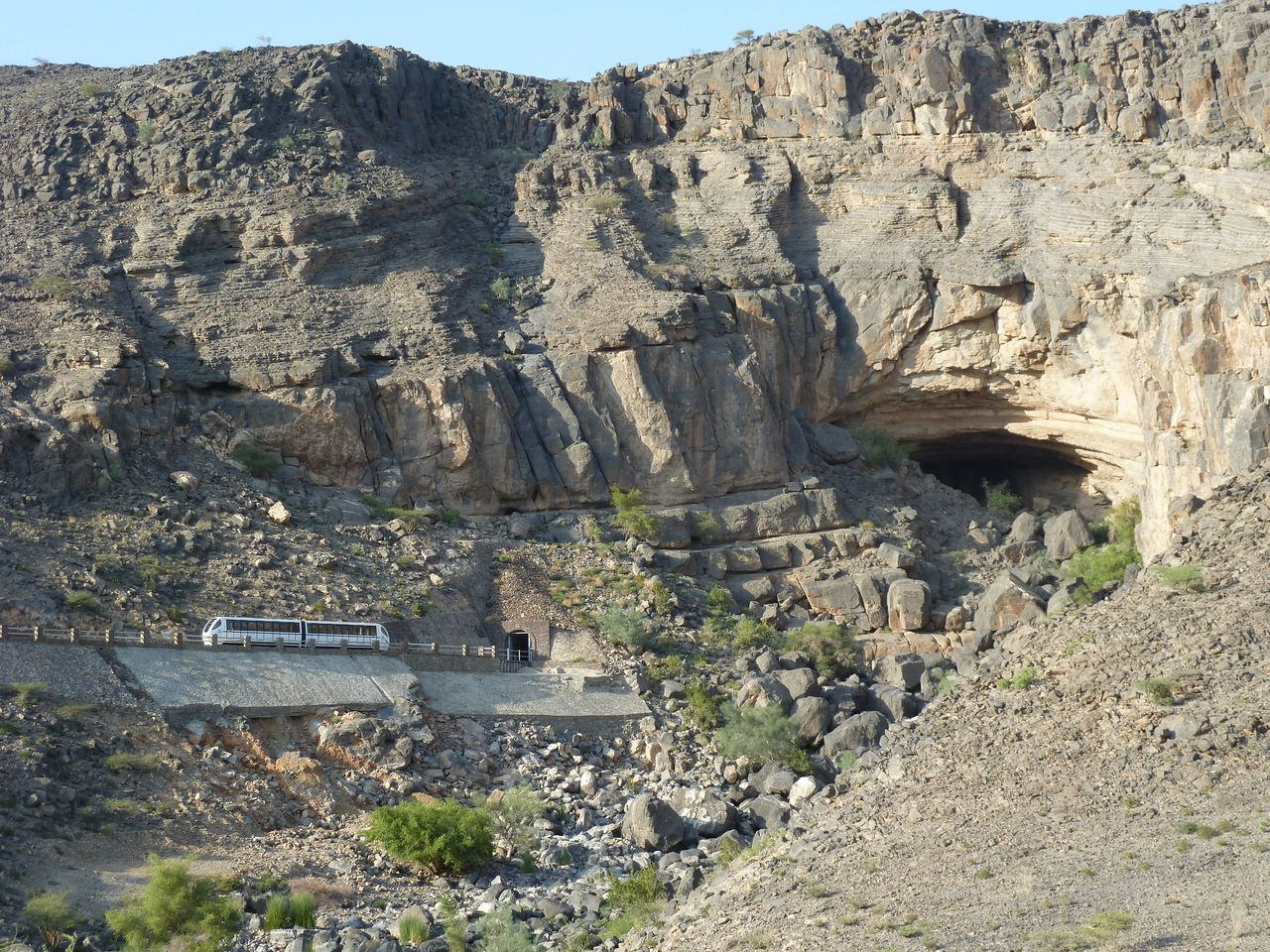
- Al-Hootah Cave in the Hajar Mountains
- Interactive map of Al Hoota Cave
- Location: Oman
- Coordinates: 23°04′55″N 57°21′17″EOM-DA
- Length: 5 km (3.1 miles)
- Geology: Karst
- Show cave opened: 2006
- Show cave length: 4.5 kilometres (2.8 mi)
- Lighting: electric
- Website: www.alhootacave.com

Al Hoota Cave (Arabic: كَهْف ٱلْهُوْتَة, romanized: Kahf Al-Hūtah) is a cave located in Al-Hamra', Ad Dakhiliyah Governorate, Oman, at the foot of Jebel Shams, the highest mountain in Oman at 3,009 metres (9,872 ft) above sea level. It has been developed as a tourist attraction.

== Description ==
The cave is believed to be two million years old, is 4.5 kilometres (2.8 miles) long and consists of a series of large underground caverns or chambers. The first cavern is the largest and highest, a cathedral-like space with a high ceiling; as one goes further in, the caverns become lower and narrower and lead to an underground lake. The highest point is actually about 65 metres (213 ft) above the entrance. Stalagmites from this cave yield data on the palaeoclimate.

There are two or four lakes in all, one 800 metres (2,600 ft) long.

== Resident animals ==
One lake is home to the small Omani blind cave fish, Garra barreimiae. Unlike its above-ground examples, the species discarded its eyesight in Al Hoota Cave, being useless in the darkness; juveniles have eyes, but these become covered when they mature. They also lost their pigmentation.

In all, the cave is home to over 100 animal species, including small mouse-tailed bats, arthropods, mollusks, spiders, snails and water beetles.

== Tourism ==
Visitors can take a guided tour of 500 metres (1,600 ft) of the cave, ending at the underground lake with the blind fish.

Experienced spelunkers can descend through another entrance and take a route that requires some abseiling (rappelling) and swimming. In the end, it connects to the endpoint of the guided tour.

A small electric train was intended to take tourists from the visitor centre to the cave, but it has not been working for some time; in 2025 the 19-metre (62 ft) train was decorated with a graffiti mural.
