= Kot Majlas =

- Village
- Country: India
- State: Punjab
- District: Gurdaspur
- Tehsil: Batala
- Region: Majha

Government
  - Type: Panchayat raj
  - Body: Gram panchayat

Area
  - Total: 217 ha (540 acres)

Population (2011)
  - Total: 1,840; 954/886 ♂/♀
  - Scheduled Castes: 474; 254/220 ♂/♀
  - Total Households: 312

Languages
  - Official: Punjabi
- Time zone: UTC+5:30 (IST)
- Telephone: 01871
- ISO 3166 code: IN-PB
- Vehicle registration: PB-18
- Website: gurdaspur.nic.in

Kot Majlas is a village in Batala in Gurdaspur district of Punjab State, India. It is located 16 kilometres (9.9 mi) from sub district headquarter, 36 kilometres (22 mi) from district headquarter and 8 kilometres (5.0 mi) from Sri Hargobindpur. The village is administrated by Sarpanch an elected representative of the village.

== Demography ==
As of 2011, the village has a total number of 312 houses and a population of 1840 of which 954 are males while 886 are females. According to the report published by Census India in 2011, out of the total population of the village 474 people are from Schedule Caste and the village does not have any Schedule Tribe population so far.

== See also ==
- List of villages in India
