= Majlis al Jinn =

Cave chamber in Oman

Coordinates: 22.880643°N 59.105206°E

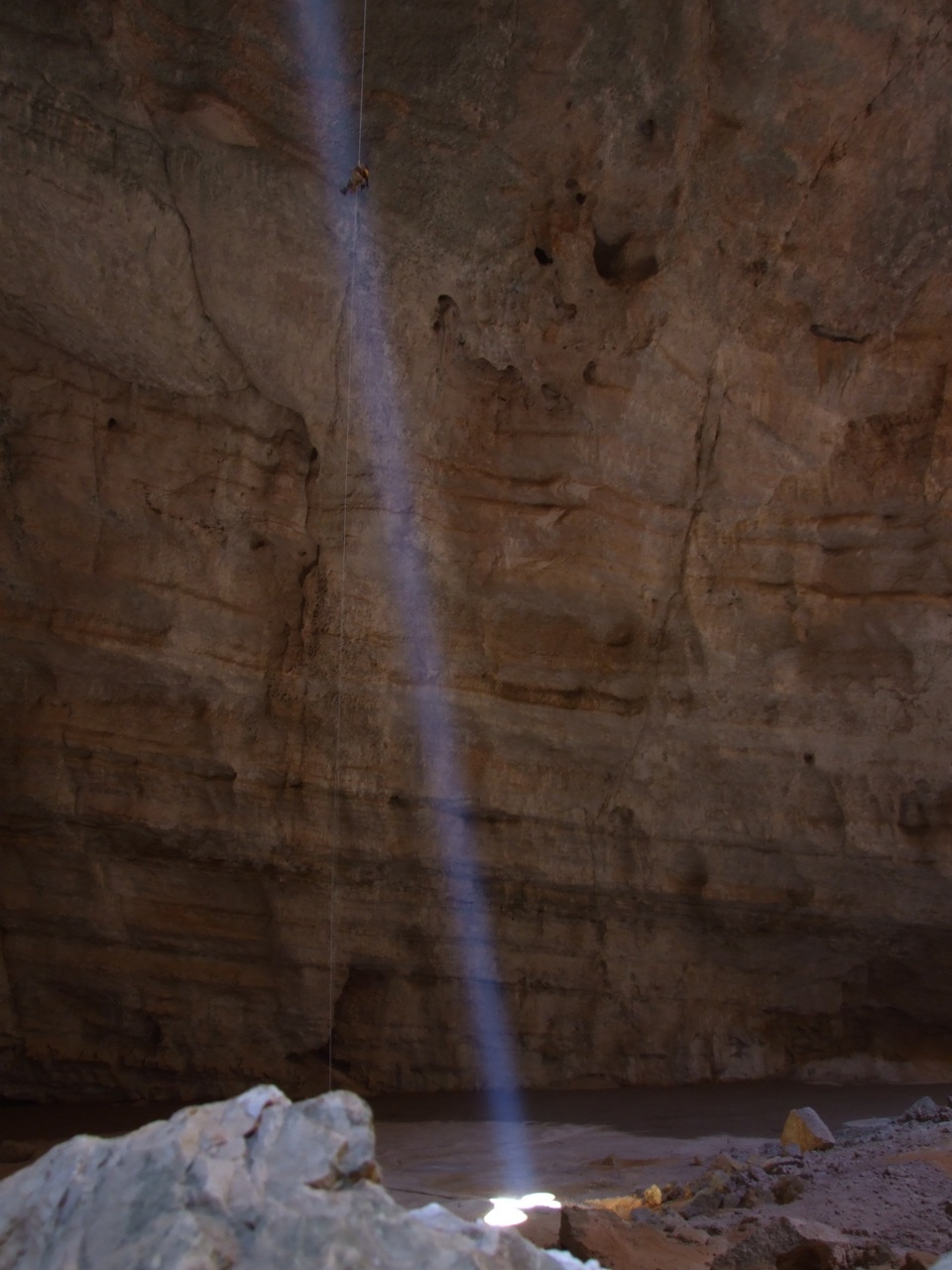
A climber lit by a beam of light during a descent to the cave floor

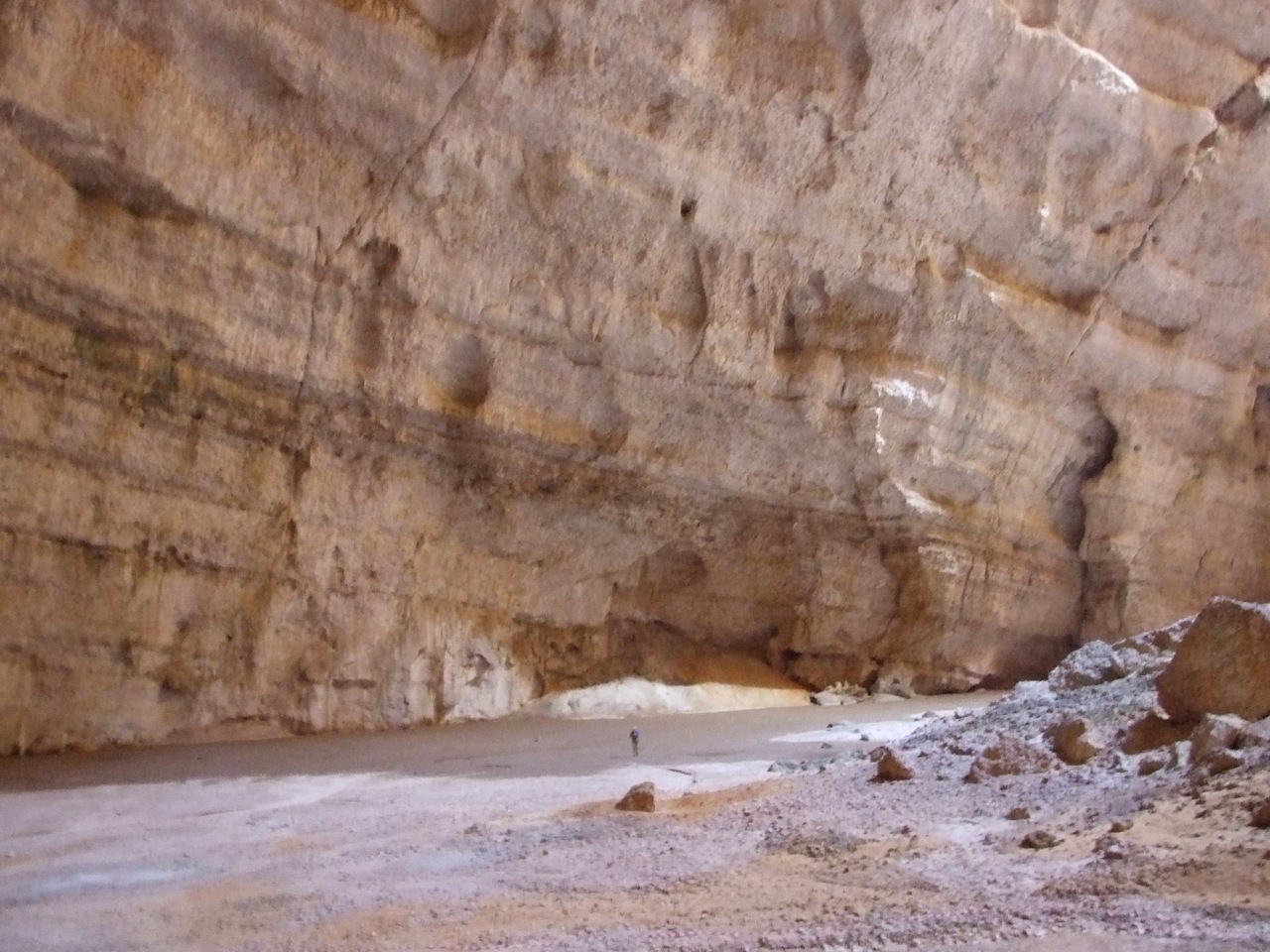
A caver walking on the dry bed of the intermittent lake, at the lowest part of the cave

Majlis al Jinn, also Majlis al-Jinn (Arabic: مجلس الجن, lit. 'meeting/gathering place of the Jinn') is one of the ten largest known cave chambers in the world, as measured by the surface area of the floor. However this list changes with every new discovery. The cave is located in a remote area of the Selma Plateau at 1,380 metres above sea level in the Sultanate of Oman, 100 km south-east from Muscat.

== Description ==
The Selma Plateau is a shallow syncline on the north-eastern limb of the Jabal Bani Jabir anticline. The cave was formed in fossiliferous carbonate rocks of the Middle Eocene Hadhramaut Group, Dammam Formation. It is one of five vertical cave entrances on the Selma Plateau, but the only one with no lower exit.

Majlis al Jinn is a single chamber measuring about 310 metres by 225 metres, with a domed ceiling 120 metres high and three entrances in the roof. The totally free-standing roof is only about 40 metres thick over most of the cave. The deepest part of the cave is 178 metres below the top of the highest entrance. The volume of the chamber is approximately 4,000,000 cubic metres, and the floor area is 58,000 square metres.

When it was surveyed in 1985, Majlis al Jinn was the second largest known cave chamber in the world by volume. However, more than 15 chambers larger than Majlis al Jinn have been surveyed since that time.

There are no visible lower exits or passages leading from the chamber–these passages most likely have been blocked by debris on the cave floor. Water entering the cave collects along the lowest part of the floor, then slowly infiltrates into the fine-grained, mud-cracked sediment or evaporates. The entrances receive surface runoff from only a small drainage area, so water never reaches most parts of the cave. While surface temperatures can exceed 40 °C, air temperatures in the chamber are a constant 17–18 °C.

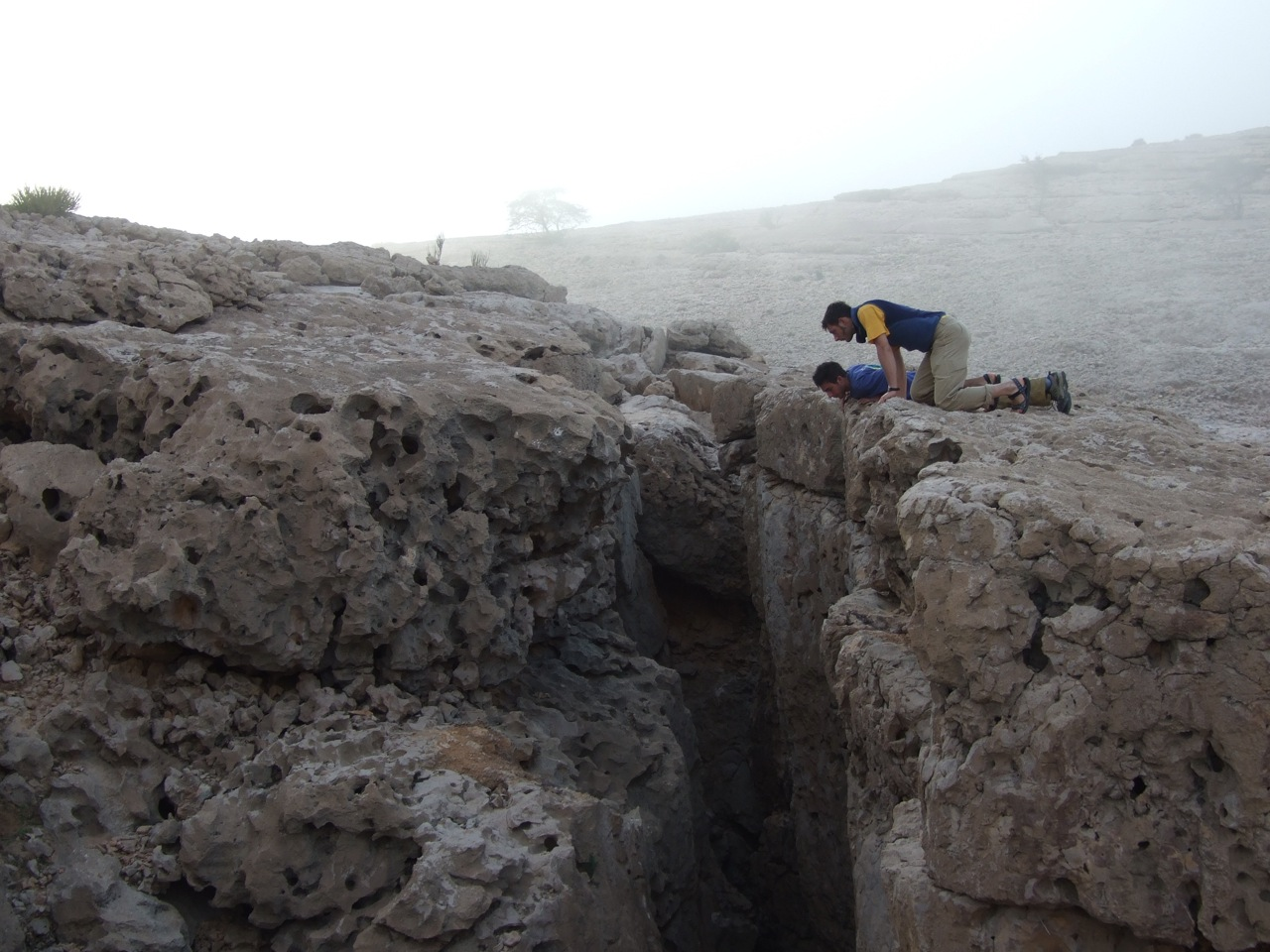
Peering into Cheryl's Drop

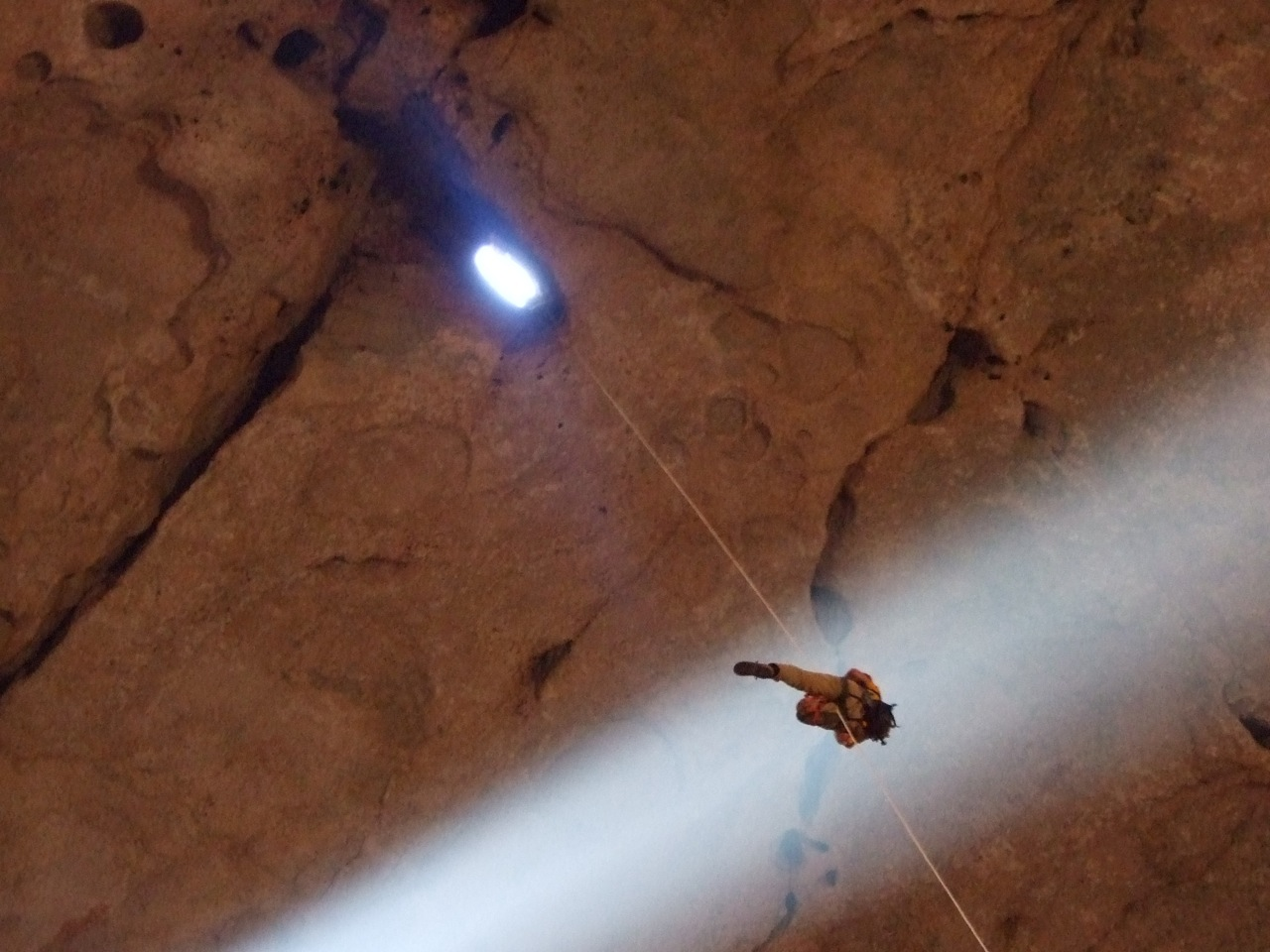
A climber ascending a rope through Cheryl's Drop

Access to the cavern is only through a free descent of one of three vertical entrances in the ceiling, formed by water seeping through the weakened marly limestone in the zones of fracturing. The two largest entrances are called Asterisk (Khoshilat Beya Al Hiyool) and First Drop (Khoshilat Maqandeli), the smallest is Cheryl's Drop (Khoshilat Minqod). Entrance depths: Cheryl's Drop - 158.2 meters. Asterisk - 139.6 meters. First Drop - 118.0 meters.

Below the two larger entrances are high piles of rocks ("breakdown.") The remains of goats, birds, and snakes have been found on the floor of the chamber. The entrance openings in the ceiling provide ambient light in the chamber most of the day. There are only a few stalactites and draperies on the ceiling and walls, but moderate and fragile speleothems are common on the floor. Growth only occurs during times of seepage and drips following heavy rains.

== Access ==
Until fairly recently there had not been a way to reach the cave by car, so cavers had to hike in carrying their equipment or rent donkeys from a village a few hours walk from the cave entrance. The original explorers, Don and Cheryl, often flew into the area by helicopter. Now the cave can be reached on a rough track, which requires four-wheel drive.

Cavers entering Majlis al Jinn require about 200m of specialized rope and equipment to descend and ascend safely. For several years tourism companies had been providing caving trips into Majlis al Jinn, providing equipment and training.

Majlis al Jinn had grown in popularity as a BASE jumping site, particularly for special promotions. Felix Baumgartner is known to have BASE jumped in the cave. However the uncontrolled use of the cave for BASE jumping and the degradation of the area surrounding the cave seem to be the main reason behind the cave being placed off limits by the Oman government in 2008.

In 2008, the Ministry of Tourism issued a plan to develop Majlis al Jinn as a show cave, after their first show cave attracted 75,000 visitors in the first year of operation (2007-8).

In 2014, rock climbers Stefan Glowacz and Chris Sharma abseiled into the cave and climbed out via a very steeply overhanging route up the inside of the dome, which they claimed as the world's largest unclimbed roof.

== History ==
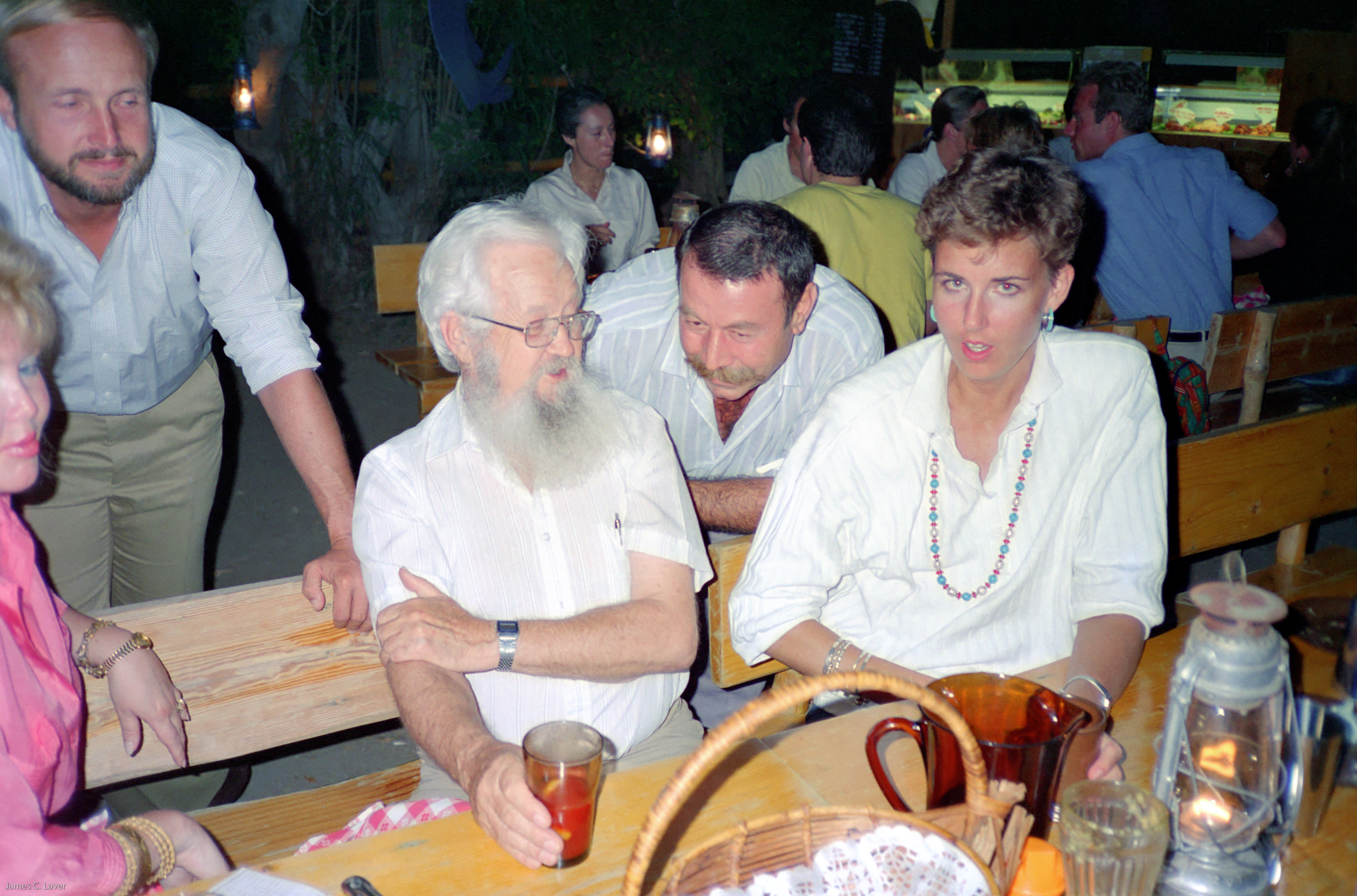
Don Davison far left, his wife Cheryl, right. Intercontinental Hotel, Muscat, Oman. 1986

The entrances were discovered in June 1983 by Americans W. Don Davison, Jr. (nickname: D^{2}) and his wife, Cheryl S. Jones. Don, a hydrogeologist, who was employed by the government of Oman's Public Authority for Water Resources (PAWR), which later became the Ministry of Water Resources. The cave was located and mapped as part of the PAWR's Karst Research Program.

Exploration of Majlis Al Jinn began on 23 June 1983, when Don rappelled down the 118m First Drop. Cheryl's Drop was first negotiated on 1 March 1984, by Cheryl Jones. The 158m drop is the deepest free rappel into any known cave in Oman or the Arabian Peninsula. Finally, Don descended the Asterisk on 22 April 1985.

Don and Cheryl surveyed and photographed the cave in April and May, 1985. The map and cross sections they created, as well as photos, were originally published in the special PAWR report and have been reproduced many times since.

Omanis living in the area of the Selma Plateau told Don and Cheryl that they did not have names for any of the holes on the plateau that served as entrances to the caves. Thus, Cheryl gave the cave its name, referring to the Omani belief that jinn live in caves. Years later locals said they call the cave "Khoshilat Maqandeli" from the refuge for goats near one of the entrances. Nowadays locals refer to this cave as Khoshilat Maqandeli, while internationally it is known as Majlis al Jinn.

Don authored the first published account of the cave's discovery as a special report Majlis Al Jinn Cave, Sultanate of Oman, issued by the PAWR in October, 1985. A second article by Don, Meeting Room of the Spirits, was featured in the September–October, 1990, issue of Aramco World magazine. Majlis al Jinn was included in a story in the April, 2003, issue of National Geographic Magazine.
