= 1994 Omani general election =

General elections were held in Oman in 1994. They were the first elections in a Gulf Arab country in which women could both vote and stand as a candidate.

== Electoral system ==
Following the country's first national census in 1993, the electoral system was modified slightly from that used for the 1991 elections in which each wilayah was represented by one member in the Consultative Assembly. The 20 wilayahs with a population of over 30,000 were granted an extra representative, increasing the number of elected members from 59 to 80.

Single seat wilayahs elected two candidates and two-seat wilayahs elected four, of which half were chosen by Fahd bin Mahmoud al Said and Sultan Qaboos to sit in the Consultative Assembly.

Although women had been able to vote in the 1991 elections, they had not been able to stand as candidates. However, the 1994 elections saw women able to stand in seats in the Muscat Governorate.

== Results ==
Female candidates won two seats; Shakour bint Mohammed al-Ghamari in Muscat and Taiba al-Mawali in Seeb.

=== Members ===
Wilayah	Member
Adam	Mohammed bin Sultan bin Hamed al-Mahrooqi
Al Amarat	Mohammed bin Hamoud bin Mohammed al-Wahaibi
Al Amarat	Salim bin Said bin Salim al-Wahaibi
Al Awabi	Abdalrahman bin Saif bin Hammad al-Kharousi
Al Buraimi	Ahmed bin Rashid bin Homed al-Shamsi
Al Hamra	Salim bin Mohammed bin Ahmed al-Abri
Al-Jabal al-Aswat	Salim bin Ahmed bin Sabah Na'awm al-Kathiri
Al Jazir	Ghareeb bin Sa'ad bin Musallam al-Junaidi
Al Kamil walWafi	Khamis bin Halis bin Khadim al-Hashmi
Al-Mudhaibi	Hilal bin Ali bin Soud al-Habsi
Al-Mudhaibi	Mubarak bin Abdallah bin Hamid al-Rashdi
Al Qabil	Abdallah bin Hamdoon bin Humaid al-Harthi
Al-Rustaq	Khalil bin Saif bin Nasser al-Ghafri
Al-Rustaq	Abdalwahed bin Suleiman bin Zahran al-Harasi
Bahla	Mohammed bin Abdallah bin Said al-Adwi
Bahla	Samah bin Suleiman bin Saif al-Shakaili
Barka	Ali bin Hamoud bin Ali Al Bu Sa'id
Barka	Salim bin Hamel bin Khuwaidam al-Mashaifri
Bawshar	Nasser bin Mansoor bin Saif al-Salti
Bawshar	Saif bin Suleiman bin Humaid al-Hasni
Bidbid	Mohammed bin Hamed bin Zuhair al-Farsi
Bidiya	Amer bin Mohammed bin Shamis al-Hajri
Bukha	Ahmed bin Abdallah bin Mohammed al-Malik al-Shuhi
Dhalkout	Ahmed bin Suhail bin Ajaham Hardan
Dhank	Ali bin Said bin Khalifa al-Yahyai
Dibba Al-Baya	Mohammed bin Ali Bu Rashid al-Shuhi
Dima wa Ta'een	Saif bin Mohsin bin Hilal al-Ma'amari
Duqm	Abdallah bin Mabkhout bin Ali al-Janaibi
Halaniyat	Abdalaziz bin Salim bin Sa'id al-Naqash al-Mahri
Himah	al-Abd bin al-Sharqi bin Aks al-Haroosi
Ibra	Abdallah bin Hashel bin Rashid al-Maskeri
Ibri	Hamed bin Mohammed bin Hamed al-Jasasi
Ibri	Saif bin Ali bin Said al-Ghafri
Izki	Abdullah bin Mohammed bin Gaith al-Darmaki
Jalan Bani Bu Ali	Abdullah bin Mohammed al-Hamouda
Jalan Bani Bu Ali	Juma bin Hamed bin Salim al-Ghilani
Jalan Bani Bu Hasan	Sa'id bin Mohammed bin Abdallah al-Suwa'i
Khabourah	Abdallah bin Mohammed bin Said al-Sa'idi
Khabourah	Qais bin Zahran bin Saif al-Hosni
Khasab	Juma bin Hamdan bin Hasan al-Malik al-Shuhi
Liwa	Ahmed bin Khalfan bin Ahmed al-Ghufaili
Madha	Ahmed bin Abdallah bin Khalfan al-Madhani
Maghshan	Musallam bin Salim bin Sa'id al-Sha'ash'i
Mahdha	Ahmed bin Obaid bin Juma al-Ka'abi
Mahoot	Ali bin Suwaidan bin Suwfwid
Manah	Zahran bin Said bin Nasser al-Hadrami
Masirah	Mohammed bin Khamis bin Hilal al-Majali
Mirbat	Khalid bin Ahmed bin Said al-Amri
Musana'ah	Salim bin Mohammed bin Sa'id al-Mardoof al Sa'idi
Musana'ah	Khalifa bin Salim bin Mohammed al-Nasri
Muscat	Hamad bin Abdallah bin Nasser al-Riyami
Muscat	Shakour bint Mohammed al-Ghamari
Muttrah	Aflah bin Hamad bin Salim al-Ruwahi
Muttrah	Mahmoud bin Abdallah bin Mohammed al-Khanji
Nakhal	Mohammed bin Nasser bin Suleiman al-Habaishi
Nizwa	Al-Khattab bin Ahmed bin Soud al-Kindi
Nizwa	Nasser bin Rashid bin Marhoon al-Toobi
Qurayyat	Mohammed bin Saif bin Mohammed al-Jandhami
Rakhyout	Abdallah bin Mustahail bin Salim Shammas
Sa'dah	Salim bin Khalfan bin Rashid al-Shukaili
Saham	Saif bin Marhoon bin Ali al-Ma'amari
Saham	Ali bin Abdallah bin Ali al-Badi
Salalah	Daris bin Khadim bin Fatah Bu Shaham
Seeb	Hamoud bin Ahmed bin Mohammed al-Hinai
Seeb	Taiba al-Mawali
Shinas	Ali bin Mohammed bin Ali al-Ka'abi
Shinas	Mohammed bin Abdallah bin Ahmed al-Khousaibi
Sohar	Rashid bin Hamdan bin Ali al-Maqbali
Sohar	Khalfan bin Salim bin Masoud
Suma'il	Hilal bin Soud bin Nasser Abu Said
Suma'il	Mohammed bin Nasser bin Humaid al-Naddabi
Sur	Mohammed bin Nasser bin Mohammed al-Araimi
Sur	Ali bin Musallam bin Juma al-Alawi
Suwayq	Rashid bin Hamdan bin Saba'a al-Sa'idi
Suwayq	Mohammed bin Ali bin Nasser al-Kiyoumi
Taqah	Ali bin Sahel bin Ali al-Hafeed
Thumrait	Said bin Sa'ad bin Mohammed Ghawas
Wadi al-Ma'awal	Saleh bin Soud bin Khalil al-Ma'awali
Wadi bin Khalid	Hamoud bin Rashid bin Saif al-Sha'aibi
Yanqul	Sa'id bin Amer bin Saif
Source: Allen & Rigsbee
