= 1997 Omani general election =

1997 general election in Oman

General elections were held in Oman on 16 October 1997.

== Electoral system ==
The 82 members of the Consultative Assembly were selected in a two-stage process. Elections were held in 60 constituencies (based on the wilayahs); in 38 constituencies two members were elected, of which Sultan Qaboos chose one to sit in the Assembly, whilst in the remaining 22 constituencies four members were elected, of which the Sultan chose two.

Only around 51,000 people were eligible to vote, with voters chosen by tribal leaders.

== Campaign ==
A total of 736 candidates contested the elections.

== Results ==
The two incumbent female MPs (Shakour bint Mohammed al-Ghamari in Muscat and Taiba al-Mawali in Seeb) were both re-elected.

=== Members ===
Wilayah	Member	Notes
Adam	Nasser bin Ali bin Ahmed al-Mahrooqi	
Al Amarat	Mohammed bin Hamoud bin Mohammed al-Wahaibi	Re-elected
Al Amarat	Amer bin Said bin Barakat al-Hadi	
Al Awabi	Mahmud bin Muhanna bin Khalfan al-Kharusi	
Al Buraimi	Ahmed bin Rashid bin Homed al-Shamsi	Re-elected
Al Buraimi	Rashid bin Sultan bin Ali al-Ghaithi	
Al Hamra	Salim bin Mohammed bin Ahmed al-Abri	Re-elected
Al-Jabal al-Aswat	Salim bin Ahmed bin Sabah Na'awm al-Kathiri	Re-elected
Al Jazir	Ghareeb bin Sa'ad bin Musallam al-Junaidi	Re-elected
Al Kamil walWafi	Khamis bin Halis bin Khadim al-Hashmi	Re-elected
Al-Mudhaibi	Hilal bin Ali bin Soud al-Habsi	Re-elected
Al-Mudhaibi	Said bin Soud bin Mohammed al-Ghufali	
Al Qabil	Ali bin Ahmed bin Abdallah al-Harthi	
Al-Rustaq	Khalil bin Saif bin Nasser al-Ghafri	Re-elected
Al-Rustaq	Saif bin Mohammed bin Saif al-Lamki	
Bahla	Mohammed bin Abdallah bin Said al-Adwi	Re-elected
Bahla	Ibrahim bin Soud bin Badr al-Hinai	
Barka	Mohammed bin Khalfan bin Mohammed al-Rishedi	
Barka	Salim bin Hamel bin Khuwaidam al-Mashaifri	Re-elected
Bawshar	Nasser bin Mansoor bin Saif al-Salti	Re-elected
Bawshar	Mubarak bin Masoud bin Suleiman al-Shibli	
Bidbid	Abdallah bin Mohammed bin Ghuneim al-Rahbi	
Bidiya	Amer bin Mohammed bin Shamis al-Hajri	Re-elected
Bukha	Ahmed bin Abdallah bin Mohammed al-Malik al-Shuhi	Re-elected
Dhalkout	Badr bin Ahmed bin Ali Ba'awain	
Dhank	Ali bin Said bin Khalifa al-Yahyai	Re-elected
Dibba Al-Baya	Rashid bin Abdullah bin Rashid Haroub al-Shuhi	
Dima wa Ta'een	Abdullah bin Rashid bin Musallam al-Rahbi	
Duqm	Abdallah bin Mabkhout bin Ali al-Janaibi	Re-elected
Halaniyat	Abdalaziz bin Salim bin Sa'id al-Naqash al-Mahri	Re-elected
Himah	Mohammed bin Said bin Ali al-Harousi	
Ibra	Salim bin Hamoud bin Majid al-Ismaili	
Ibri	Ali bin Saleh bin Ali al-Kalbani	
Ibri	Saif bin Ali bin Said al-Ghafri	Re-elected
Izki	Mohammed bin Nasser bin Rashid al-Riyarni	
Jalan Bani Bu Ali	Nasir bin Mohammed bin Said al-Sunaidi	
Jalan Bani Bu Ali	Mohammed bin Abdallah bin Mohammed al-Hamouda	
Jalan Bani Bu Hasan	Sa'id bin Mohammed bin Abdallah al-Suwa'i	Re-elected
Khabourah	Ali bin Khalfan bin Selman al-Qutaiti	
Khabourah	Omar bin Ali bin Abdullah al-Hosni	
Khasab	Juma bin Hamdan bin Hasan al-Malik al-Shuhi	Re-elected
Liwa	Ahmed bin Khalfan bin Ahmed al-Ghufaili	Re-elected
Madha	Ahmed bin Abdallah bin Khalfan al-Madhani	Re-elected
Maghshan	Mabkhout bin Mohammed bin Suhail al-Hamar	
Mahdha	Said bin Obeid bin Saif al-Ka'abi	
Mahoot	Obeid bin Mohammed bin Said al-Hakmani	
Manah	Said bin Nasser bin Mohammed Al Bu Sa'id	
Masirah	Abdullah bin Khalifs bin bin Khamis al-Majali	
Mirbat	Khalid bin Ahmed bin Said al-Amri	Re-elected
Musana'ah	Salim bin Mohammed bin Sa'id al-Mardoof al Sa'idi	Re-elected
Musana'ah	Talal bin Ali bin Salim al-Amry	
Muscat	Rajah bin Ali bin Rajah al-Kathiri	
Muscat	Shakour bint Mohammed al-Ghamari	Re-elected
Muttrah	Abdullah bin Mohammed bin Salim al-Hasni	
Muttrah	Murtadha bin Hasan bin Ali al-Lawati	
Nakhal	Mohammed bin Nasser bin Suleiman al-Habaishi	Re-elected
Nizwa	Al-Khattab bin Ahmed bin Soud al-Kindi	Re-elected
Nizwa	Salim bin Hamad bin Salim al-Kamiyani	
Qurayyat	Mohammed bin Saif bin Mohammed al-Jandhami	Re-elected
Qurayyat	Mahfoudh bin Ali bin Juma al-Juma	
Rakhyout	Said bin Ali bin Awadh al-Sa'adoni Ak'ak	
Sa'dah	Salim bin Khalfan bin Rashid al-Shukaili	Re-elected
Saham	Mohammed bin Nasser bin Salim al-Ma'amari	
Saham	Ali bin Abdallah bin Ali al-Badi	Re-elected
Salalah	Ahmed bin Awadh bin Ahmed al-Shanfari	
Seeb	Harith bin Mansour bin Ghalib al-Amry	
Seeb	Taiba al-Mawali	Re-elected
Shinas	Yousef bin Ahmed bin Shahin al-Baluchi	
Shinas	Mohammed bin Abdallah bin Ahmed al-Khousaibi	Re-elected
Sohar	Rashid bin Hamdan bin Ali al-Maqbali	Re-elected
Sohar	Abdallah bin Mubarak bin Abdallah al-Balushi	
Suma'il	Khalfan bin Sultan bin Saif al-Bakri	
Suma'il	Mohammed bin Nasser bin Humaid al-Naddabi	Re-elected
Sur	Abdallah bin Saleh bin Abdallah al-Khamyasi al-Araimi	
Sur	Nasir bin Hamed bin Khalfan al-Bilal al-Makhini	
Suwayq	Hamad bin Khamis bin Ibrahim al-Jadidi	
Suwayq	Mohammed bin Ali bin Nasser al-Kiyoumi	Re-elected
Taqah	Said bin Masoud bin Sabah al-Ma'ashani	
Thumrait	Musallam bin Brokein bin Bakhait al-Mashali	
Wadi al-Ma'awal	Saleh bin Soud bin Khalil al-Ma'awali	Re-elected
Wadi bin Khalid	Hamoud bin Rashid bin Saif al-Sha'aibi	Re-elected
Yanqul	Salim bin Harned bin Marzouq al-Badi	
Source: Allen & Rigsbee
