= 1991 Omani general election =

General elections were held in Oman for the first time in 1991.

== Background ==
Sultan Qaboos announced the creation of the Consultative Assembly to replace the State Consultative Council in a speech on National Day in November 1990.

== Electoral system ==
The 60-member Consultative Assembly consisted of 59 district representatives and a Chairman. It was initially announced that each of the 59 electoral districts, based on the country's wilayahs, would nominate three candidates, and it was assumed that the candidates would then face direct elections. In April 1991 provincial committees started producing lists of candidates by secret ballot. The provincial committees were between 400 and 500 people in size and consisted of people with "valued opinion and experience". They were appointed by local governors and restricted to dignitaries, tribal leaders and some graduates, all of whom had to be invited to vote by local governors. Women could be selected to join the committees but were not allowed to stand as candidates.

Candidates were required to be at least 30 years old, not have an unpardoned conviction for an "offence of dishonesty" and be of "high esteem [and] good reputation".

== Results ==
Although elections had been expected, a royal decree in November resulted in the candidate lists being reviewed by Deputy Prime Minister for Legal Affairs Fahd bin Mahmoud al Said. Bin Mahmud then made a recommendation for which candidate to join the Consultative Assembly to Qaboos to ratify.

=== Members ===
Wilayah	Member
Adam	Mohammed bin Sultan bin Hamed al-Mahrooqi
Al Amarat	Abdallah bin Isal al-Kindi
Al Awabi	Abdalrahman bin Saif bin Hammad al-Kharousi
Al Buraimi	Ahmed bin Rashid bin Hamed al-Shamsi
Al Hamra	Salim bin Mohammed bin Ahmed al-Abri
Al Jazir	Ghareeb bin Sa'ad bin Musallam al-Junaidi
Al Kamil walWafi	Yasser bin Ali al-Rasbi
Al-Mudhaibi	Badr bin Self Al-Bu Sa'id
Al Qabil	Abdallah bin Hamdoon bin Humaid al-Harthi
Al-Rustaq	Khalid bin Saif bin Nasser al-Ghafri
Bahla	Ibrahim bin Mohammed al-Hina'i'
Barka	Ali bin Hamoud bin Ali Al Bu Sa'id
Bawshar	Nasser bin Mansoor bin Saif al-Salti
Bidbid	Ahmad bin Nasser al-Rahbi
Bidiya	Amer bin Mohammed bin Shamis al-Hajri
Bukha	Ahmed bin Abdallah bin Mohammed al-Malik al-Shuhi
Dhalkout	Ahmed bin Sa'id Hardan
Dhank	Ali bin Said bin Khalifa al-Yahyai
Dibba Al-Baya	Mohammed bin Ali Bu Rashid al-Shuhi
Dima wa Ta'een	Soud bin Nasser al-Handhali
Duqm	Abdallah bin Mabkhout bin Ali al-Janaibi
Himah	al-Abd bin al-Sharqi bin Aks al-Haroosi
Ibra	Abdallah bin Hashel bin Rashid al-Maskeri
Ibri	Abdullah bin Mohammed al-Yaqoubi
Izki	Abdullah bin Mohammed bin Gaith al-Darmaki
Jalan Bani Bu Ali	Abdullah bin Mohammed al-Hamouda
Jalan Bani Bu Hasan	Sa'id bin Mohammed bin Abdallah al-Suwa'i
Khabourah	Abdallah bin Mohammed bin Said al-Sa'idi
Khasab	Abdallah bin Abdulkadir al-Karnli
Liwa	Khalid bin Saif al-Raisi
Madha	Ahmed bin Abdallah bin Khalfan al-Madhani
Maghshan	Salim bin al-Nukhairah al-Katheeri
Mahdha	Ahmed bin Obaid bin Juma al-Ka'abi
Mahoot	Said bin Saif al-Hakmani
Manah	Amer bin Hamad al-Suleimani
Masirah	Mohammed bin Khan's bin Hilal al-Majali
Mirbat	Khalid bin Ahmed bin Said al-Amri
Musana'ah	Salim bin Mohammed bin Sa'id al-Mardoof al Sa'idi
Muscat	Mohsin bin Haidar bin Darwish
Muttrah	Aflah bin Hamad bin Salim al-Ruwahi
Nakhal	Malik bin Ibrahim al-Kindi
Nizwa	Yahya bin Abdullah al-Nabhani
Qurayyat	Adei bin Muhammed al-Battashi
Rakhyout	Abdallah bin Mustahail bin Salim Shammas
Sa'dah	Salim bin Khalfan bin Rashid al-Shukaili
Saham	Ibrahim bin Ali al-Asfoor
Salalah	Salim bin Abdullah al-Ruwas
Seeb	Mansour bin Harith al-Amry
Shinas	Ibrahim bin Majid al-Farsi
Sohar	Ali bin Said al-Shibli
Suma'il	Salim bin Hilal al-Khalili
Sur	Suhail bin Salim al-Makhaini
Suwayq	Rashid bin Hamdan bin Saba'a al-Sa'idi
Taqah	Sa'id bin Suhail al-Ma'ashani
Thumrait	Musallam bin Mohammed Bait Kathir
Wadi al-Ma'awal	Saleh bin Soud bin Khalil al-Ma'awali
Wadi bin Khalid	
Yanqul	Ghassan bin Hamad al-Alawi
Source: Allen & Rigsbee

== Aftermath ==
Abdullah bin Ali al-Qatabi, the former President of the State Consultative Council, was appointed Chairman of the new Consultative Assembly in November 1991. The Assembly subsequently elected two deputy chairmen at its first ordinary meeting in January 1992; Salim bin Hilal al-Khalili and Aflah bin Hamad bin Salim al-Rawahi.
