= Ad Dakhiliyah =

Ad Dakhiliyah may refer to:

- Ad Dakhiliyah Governorate, Oman
- Dakhiliyah, Syria
