= Al Shomoukh Palace =

Royal palace in Oman

- حصن الشموخ العامر

General information
- Type: Palace
- Address: QH46+29
- Town or city: Manah
- Country: Oman
- Coordinates: 22.75537°N 57.56128°E
- Owner: Sultan of Oman

Al Shomoukh Palace (Arabic: حصن الشموخ العامر Hisn al-Shomoukh al-Amer) is the Sultan of Oman's residence in Manah.

== History ==
Al Shomoukh Palace began as a royal camp set up by Sultan Qaboos bin Said in 1994 to have place to meet with local dignitaries in the Ad Dakhliyah region. The palace was completed in 2000.

== Al Shomoukh Library ==
In 2012, Sultan Qaboos opened a public library on the grounds of Al Shomoukh Palace to assist researchers, academics, and students. It contains more the than 46,000 titles including a large collection related to the culture and history of Oman. The contents of the library were transferred to the Oman Across Ages Museum prior to its opening in March 2023.
