= Wakan =

Wakan may refer to:

- Wakan, Oman, a village in Oman
- Wakan, meaning "powerful" or "sacred" in the Lakota language
- Wakan, the original Dakota name for the Rum River of Minnesota
- Wakan Tanka (variant name), the "Great Spirit," "sacred" or the "divine" as understood by the Lakota people
- A Japanese word (和館, lit. "Japan hall/building") used to describe historical Japanese settlements and missions in foreign countries. See waegwan, the Korean reading of the word
  - Waegwan in Chilgok County, North Gyeongsang province, South Korea, sharing the same name
- Wakan rōeishū, a collection of Chinese and Japanese poems
