= Musaifiyah =

- Village
- Location in Oman
- Coordinates: 23°6′36″N 57°34′1″E
- Country: Oman
- Governorate: Ad Dakhiliyah Region
- Time zone: UTC+4 (+4)

Musaifiyah is a village located on Al-Jabal Al-Akhdar (the Green Mountain) in Oman. It is located to the north of the City of Nizwa.
