= Manah =

Manah may refer to:

- Manah, Oman, a town in Oman
- Manāt, one of the three chief goddesses of Mecca.
