= Bil'arab bin Sultan =

- Imam of Oman

Rulers of Oman
- Reign: 1679-1692
- Predecessor: Sultan bin Saif
- Successor: Saif bin Sultan
- Died: 1692; Jabrin, Oman
- Dynasty: Yaruba

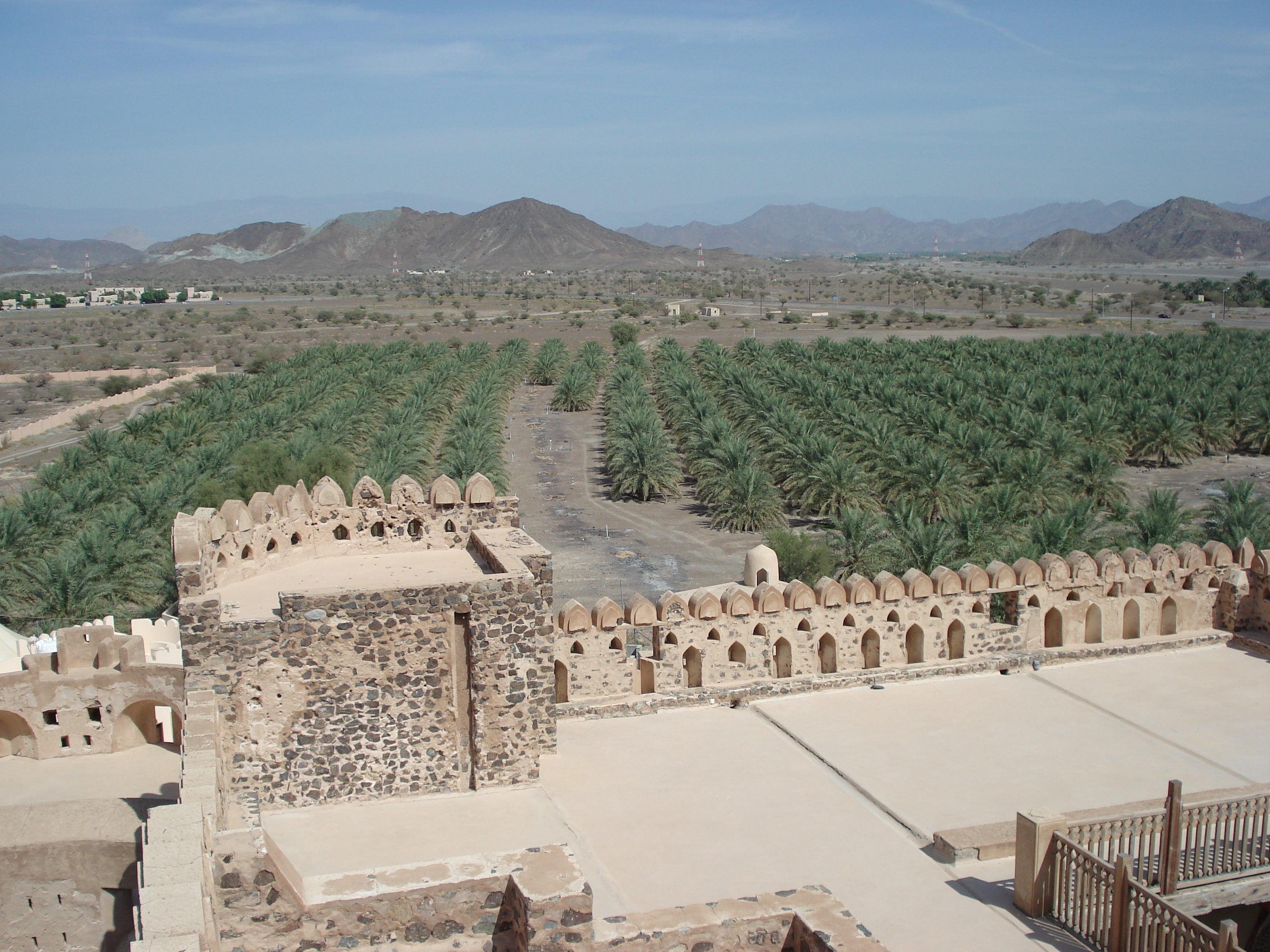
View from the castle at Jabrin

Bil'arab bin Sultan (Arabic: بلعرب بن سلطان اليعربي) (died 1692) was the third of the Yaruba dynasty of Imams of Oman, a member of the Ibadi sect. He ruled from 1679 to 1692.

Bil'arab bin Sultan succeeded as Imam in 1679 after the death of his father, Sultan bin Saif. This confirmed that the succession was now hereditary, since his father had also succeeded dynastically, while in the Ibadi tradition the Imam was elected. He is known for building a fine fort at Jabrin. Most of his reign was occupied in a struggle with his brother, Saif bin Sultan, who succeeded Bil'arab bin Sultan when he died at Jabrin in 1692.
