= Jabrin =

- Town
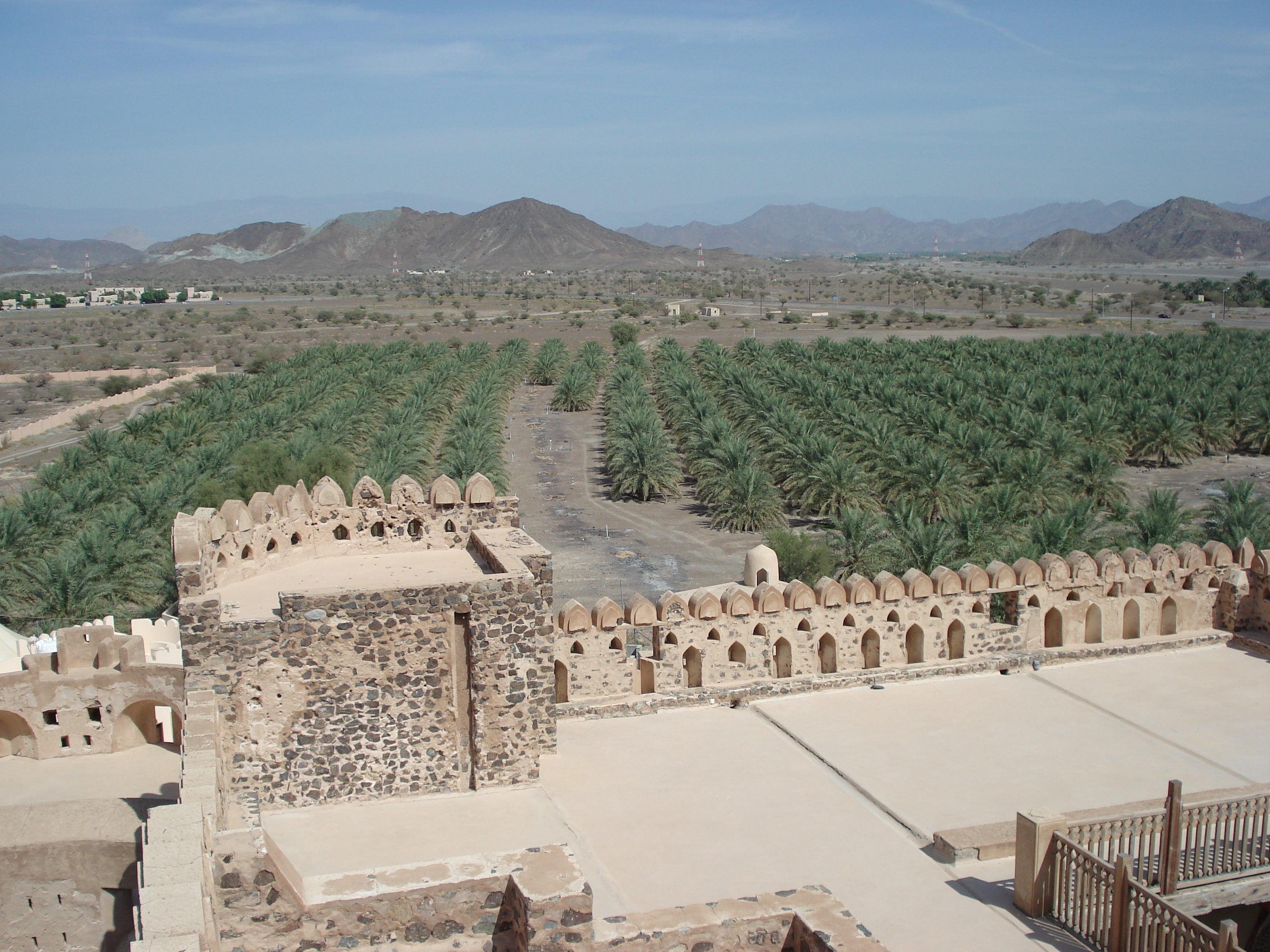
- View from Jabrin Castle

- Location in Oman
- Coordinates: 22°55′N 57°15′E
- Country: Oman
- Region: Ad Dakhiliyah Region
- Time zone: UTC+4 (Oman Standard Time)

Jabrin (Arabic: جبرين), also spelled Jabreen, Jabrin, and Jibreen, is a small town in Ad Dakhiliyah Governorate in northeastern Oman near Nizwa and the Jabal Akhdar Mountains.

The town is known for its large castle, which was built by the Yaruba dynasty Imam Bil'arab bin Sultan, who ruled from 1679 to 1692 and who was buried on site. The castle is open to visitors.

== Climate ==
Climate data for Jabrin
Month	Jan	Feb	Mar	Apr	May	Jun	Jul	Aug	Sep	Oct	Nov	Dec	Year
Mean daily maximum °C (°F)	22.7 (72.9)	23.3 (73.9)	26.6 (79.9)	31.6 (88.9)	35.8 (96.4)	37.1 (98.8)	35.4 (95.7)	34.0 (93.2)	33.2 (91.8)	31.2 (88.2)	27.0 (80.6)	23.8 (74.8)	30.1 (86.3)
Mean daily minimum °C (°F)	12.9 (55.2)	14.0 (57.2)	17.0 (62.6)	20.7 (69.3)	24.6 (76.3)	26.3 (79.3)	25.9 (78.6)	24.9 (76.8)	23.4 (74.1)	20.3 (68.5)	16.3 (61.3)	14.2 (57.6)	20.0 (68.1)
Average precipitation mm (inches)	6 (0.2)	30 (1.2)	20 (0.8)	12 (0.5)	5 (0.2)	2 (0.1)	4 (0.2)	7 (0.3)	3 (0.1)	0 (0)	4 (0.2)	6 (0.2)	99 (3.9)
Source: Climate-data.org

== Gallery ==
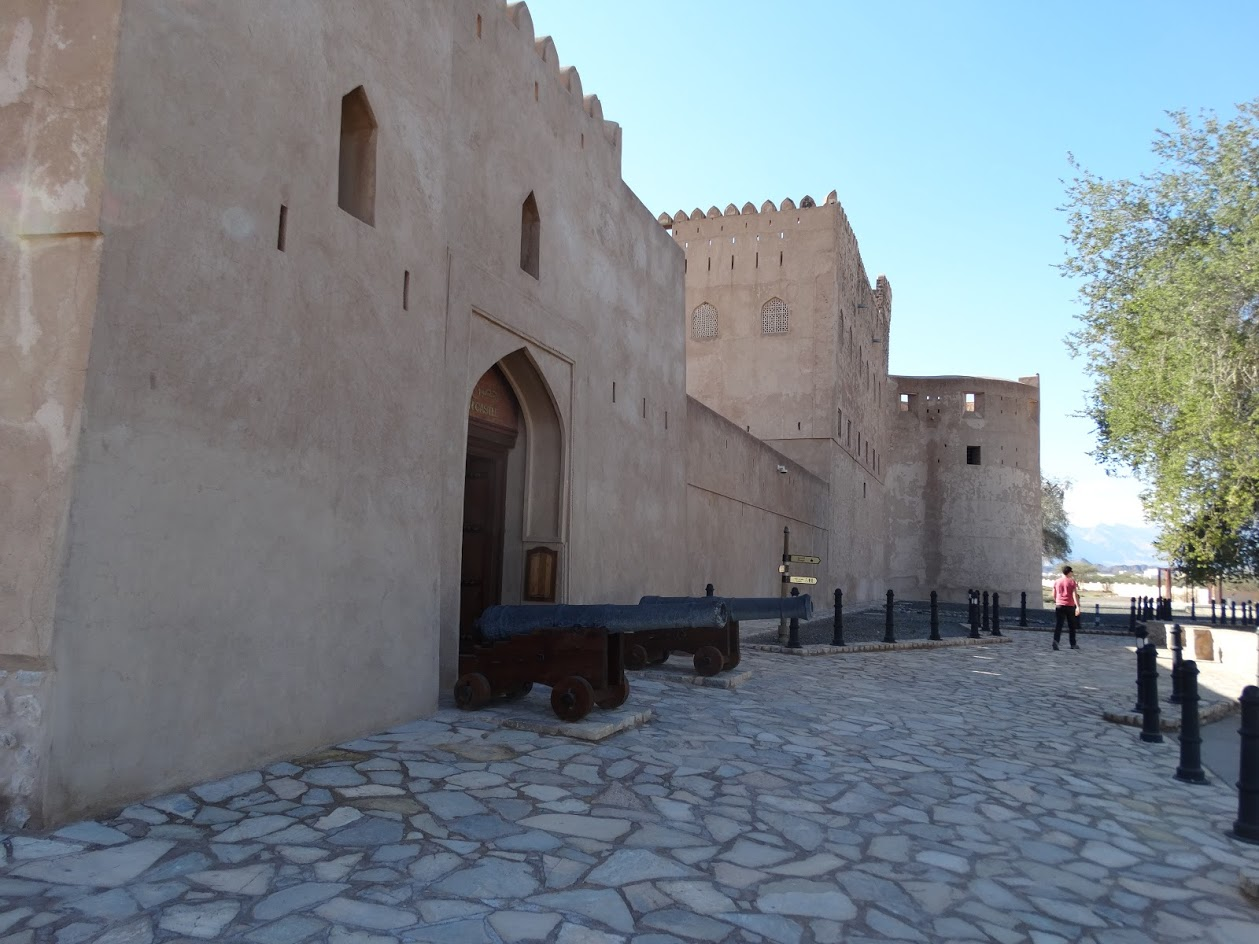

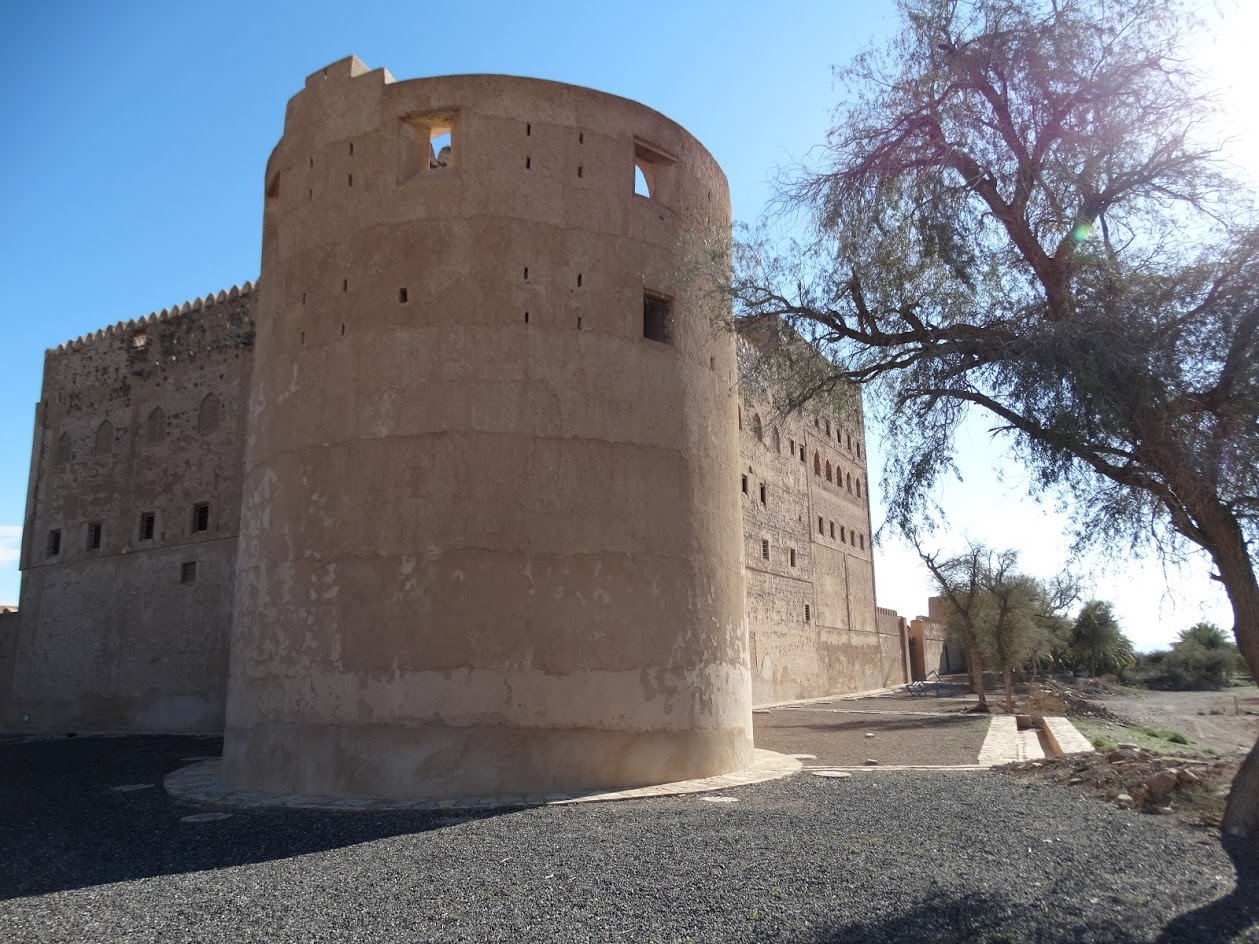

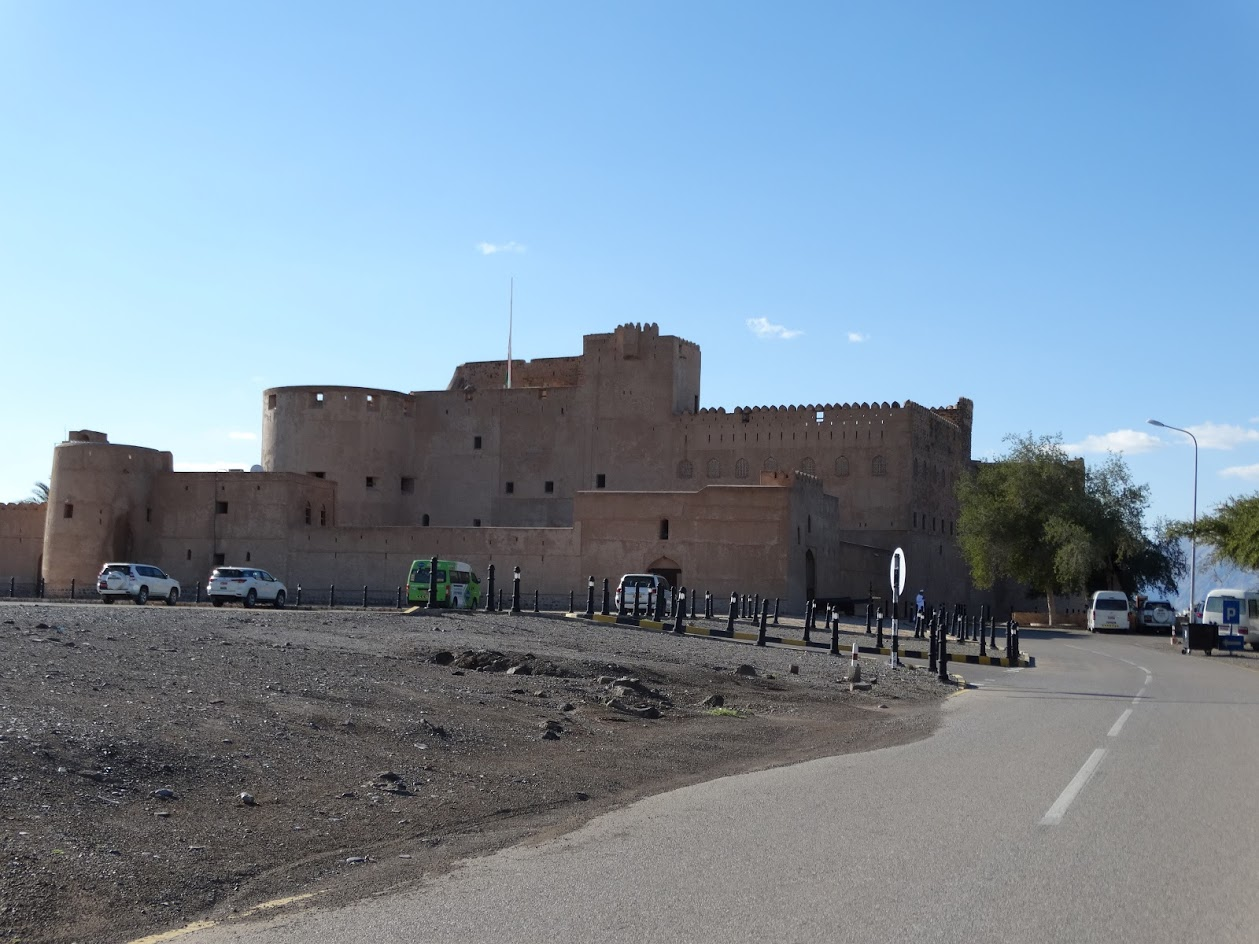

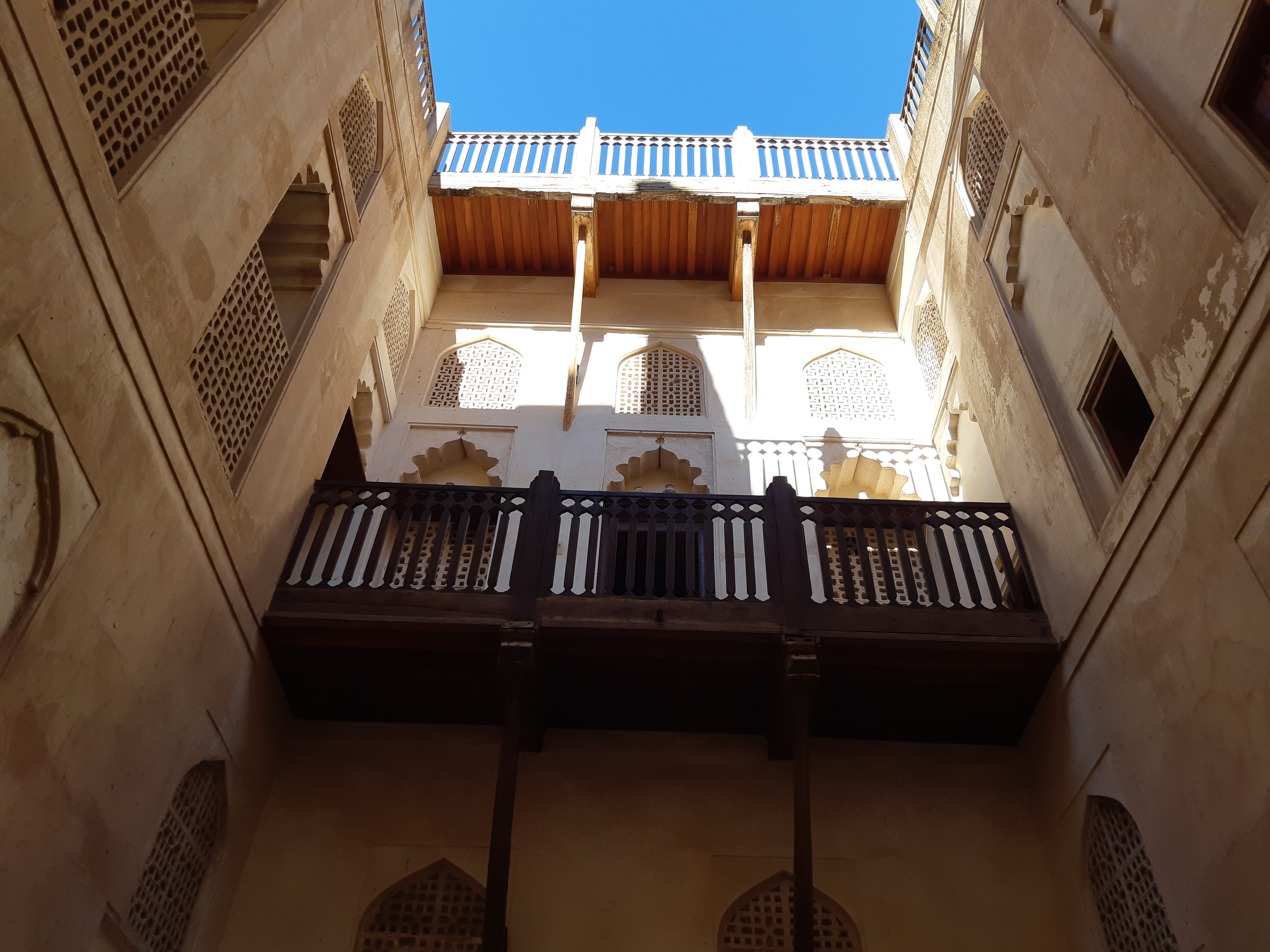

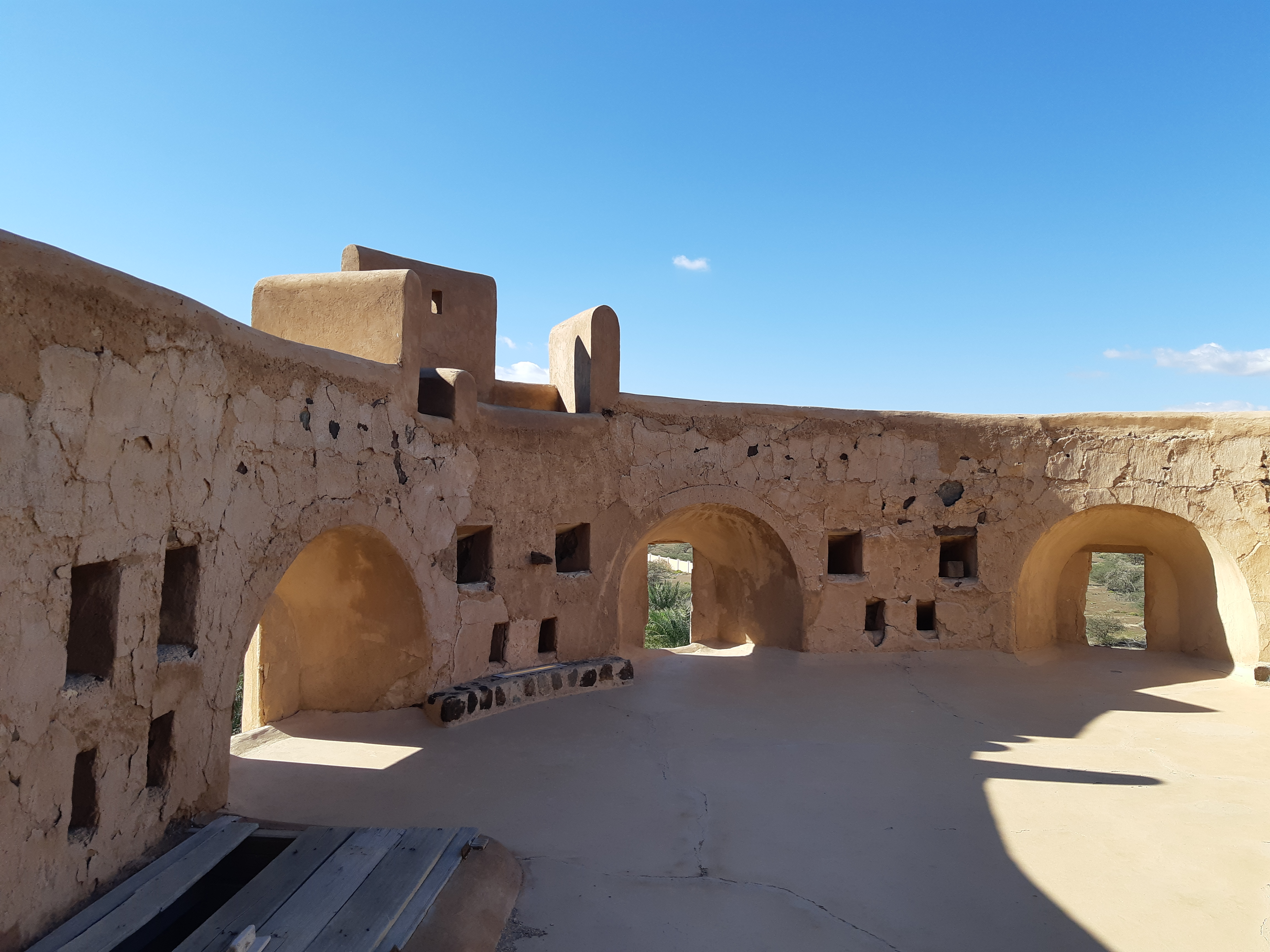

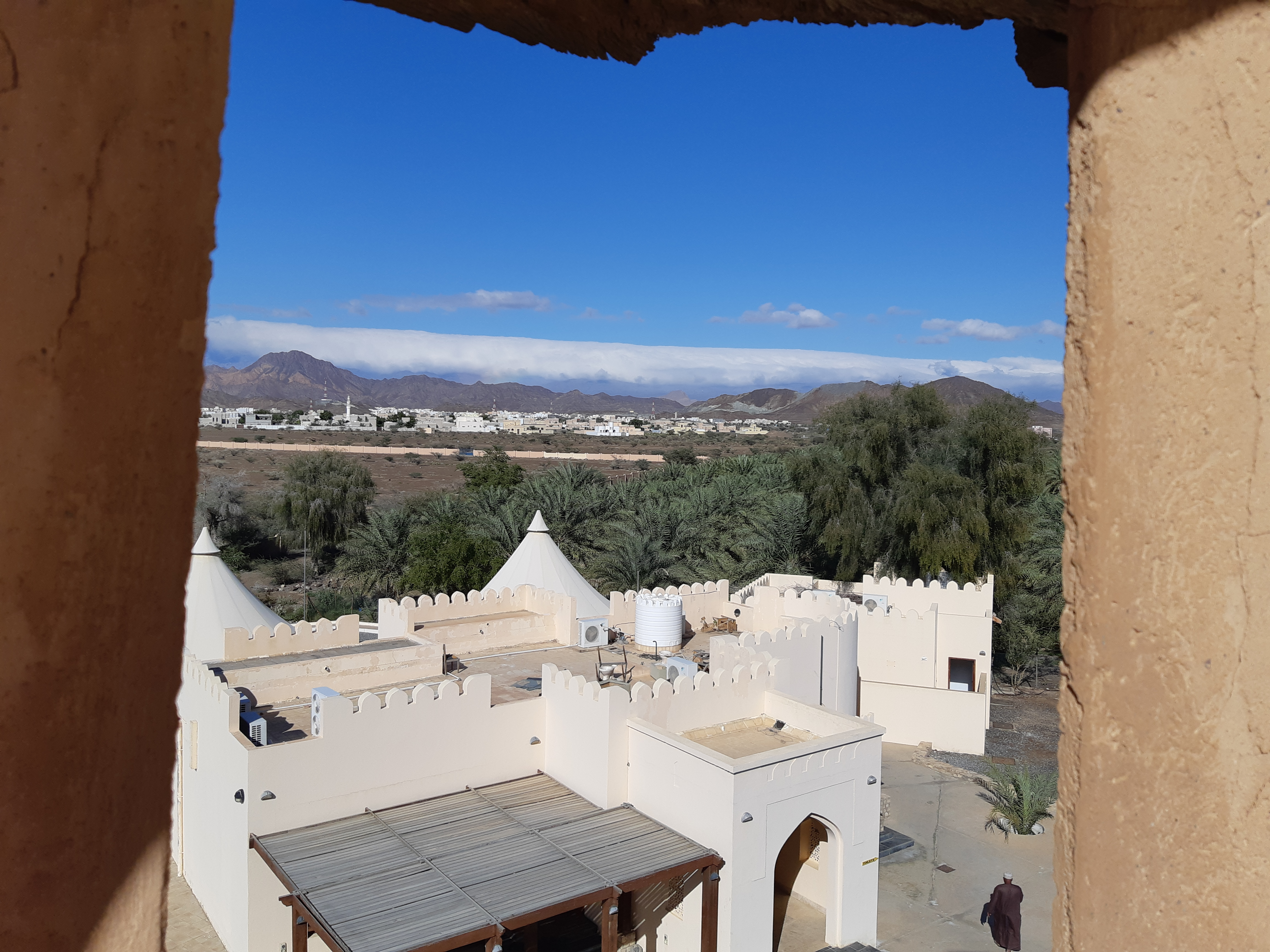

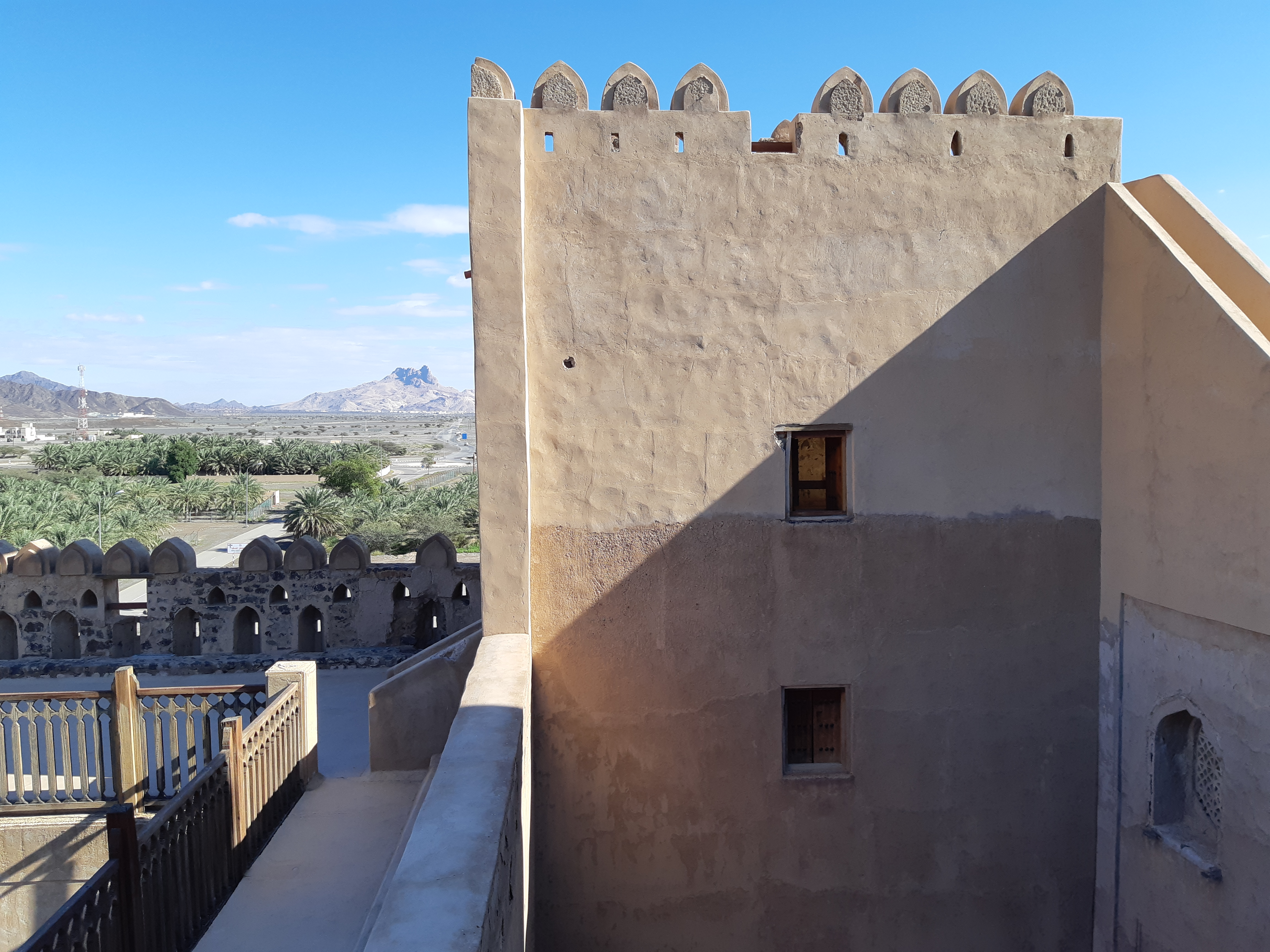

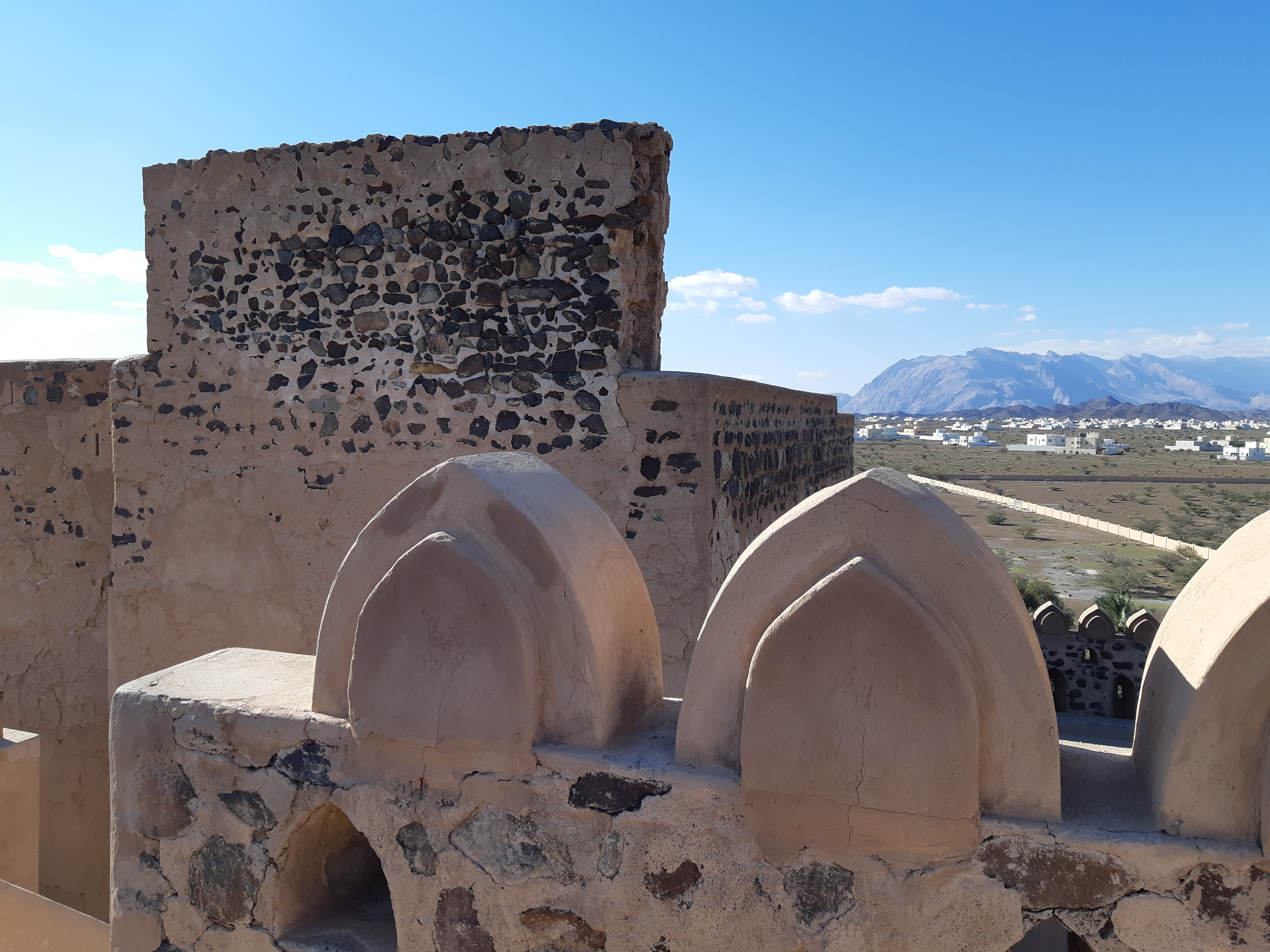
