= Taiba al-Mawali =

Omani politician

Member of the Consultative Assembly
- In office 1994–2000
- Constituency: Seeb

Taiba bint Mohammad al-Mawali is an Omani politician. In 1994, she and Shakour bint Mohammed al-Ghamari were indirectly elected to the Consultative Assembly, becoming the first women in the Parliament of Oman.

== Biography ==
Al-Mawali married a policeman and had six children. Prior to entering politics, she worked at the Ministry of Information.

In the 1994 elections, the members of the Consultative Assembly were selected by Sultan Qaboos and Sayyid Fahd from among candidates receiving the most votes from the public. The Assembly consisted of a mix of one-seat constituencies (in which the top two most voted-for candidates were put forward for selection) and two-seat constituencies (in which the four candidates with the most votes were selected from). Al-Mawali was one of the top four candidates in Seeb and was selected alongside al-Ghamari from Muscat. Both women were re-elected in 1997. She remained a member until 2000. She claimed that after leaving the Consultative Assembly, the security services had her under surveillance. She attempted to return to her previous job, but was told she was no longer needed. Instead she began working for the Ministry for Municipalities, Environment and Hydraulics, where she claims she was put in an empty office and not given any tasks.

In 2005 she was arrested after criticising the trial of 31 Islamists for allegedly plotting to overthrow the government, and was sentenced to eighteen months in prison. After appealing to the Court of Appeal, her sentence was reduced to six months. After her release she was nominated for the Nobel Peace Prize.
