= Wakan, Oman =

Village in Oman

Wakan وكان
- Village
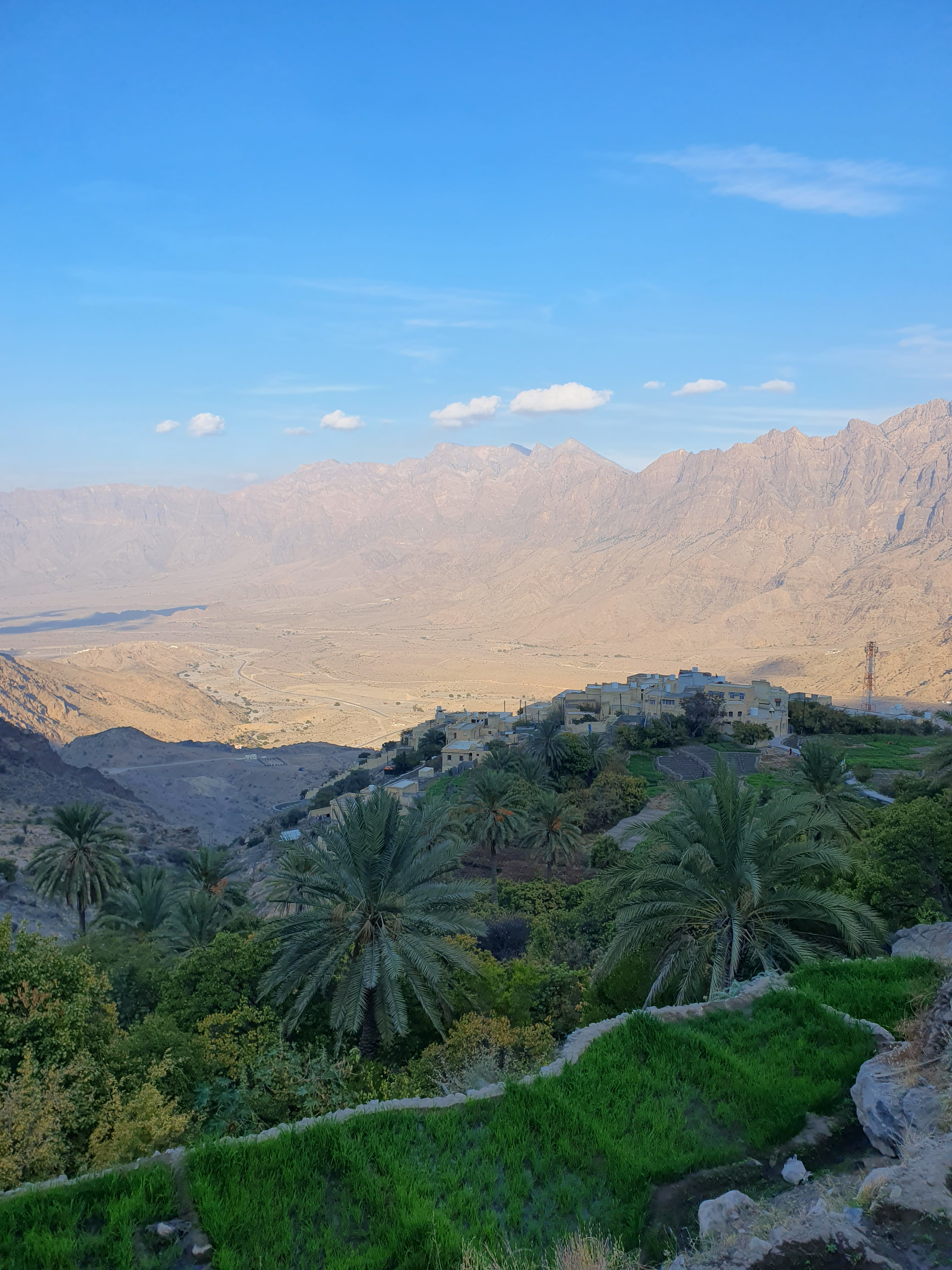
- The village of Wakan overlooking Wadi Mistal

- Location of Wakan in Oman
- Coordinates: 23°8′37″N 57°44′5″E
- Country: Oman
- Governorate: Al-Batinah South
- Wilayah: Nakhal

Population (2020)
  - Total: 162
- Time zone: UTC+4 (GST)

Wakan, Wukan or Wekan (Arabic: وكان, romanized: wkān) is a village in the wilayah of Nakhal in Oman. It lies on the slopes of the Wadi Mistal mountains at an altitude of approximately 1,500 metres (4,900 ft) above sea level (Note: Several non-specialized sources report an altitude of 2000 m.) in the Western Hajar Mountains, 140 kilometres (87 mi) from Muscat and 56 kilometres (35 mi) from Nakhal.

The village is known for its terraced gardens and orchards, where pomegranates, apricots, peaches and dates are grown. Unlike the majority of Oman, where the climate is hot and dry, the village enjoys mild temperatures in summer and cold winters, thanks to its altitude and location. A system of falaj runs through the village, carrying water from the top of the mountain to irrigate the fields.

Farming and tourism are the main sources of income for its inhabitants.

== Population ==
Population census
Year	Pop.	±%
2003	124	—
2010	112	−9.7%
2020	162	+44.6%

As of 2020, the village counted 162 inhabitants. Of these, 135 were Omani nationals and 27 foreign residents (16.7%).

== Tourism ==
Tourism contributes to the livelihoods of the village inhabitants. Tourists visit the village for its vantage point, offering views over the Wadi Mistal and the surrounding mountains, as well as for its terraced gardens. A walking trail of 700 steps starts at the entrance of the village and guides the visitors to the top through orchards and fields.

A tourist attraction is the apricot blossom season, from February to mid-March. The harvest season is usually in mid-April and lasts about two weeks.

The village is reached from the Nakhal-Awabi Highway 13, through Wadi Mistal on a graded road until the final ascent to the village, on a mountain road that requires a four-wheel drive vehicle.

== Sport ==
The village is the starting point of two trekking routes:

- W24b: Wakan to Hadash (Arabic: حدش) via Al Qawrah
- W25: Wakan to Hadash via the north flank of the Saiq Plateau

Wakan hosted the first edition of the Red Bull Titan of the Hill race, a downhill mountain biking and enduro competition, in 2017.
