= Shakour bint Mohammed al-Ghamari =

Omani politician

Member of the Consultative Assembly
- In office 1994–1997
- Constituency: Muscat

Shakour bint Mohammed al-Ghamari is an Omani politician. In 1994, she and Taiba al-Mawali were indirectly elected to the Consultative Assembly, becoming the first women in the Parliament of Oman.

== Biography ==
Al-Ghamari worked for the Ministry of Foreign Affairs, and became head of the Omani Women's Association,

In the 1994 elections, the members of the Consultative Assembly were selected by Sultan Qaboos and Sayyid Fahd from among candidates receiving the most votes from the public. The Assembly consisted of a mix of one-seat constituencies (in which the top two most voted-for candidates were put forward for selection) and two-seat constituencies (in which the four candidates with the most votes were selected from). Al-Ghamari was one of the top four candidates in Muscat and was selected alongside al-Mawali from Seeb. Both women were re-elected in 1997. Al-Ghamari was later appointed to the Council of State by Qaboos.
