= Dakhiliyah =

Settlement in Syria

Dakhiliyah داخلية
- Town
- Location of Dakhiliyah in Syria
- Coordinates: 36°22′10″N 40°54′36″E
- Country: Syria
- Governorate: al-Hasakah
- Time zone: UTC+3 (AST)

Dakhiliyah (Arabic: داخلية) is a town located in Al-Hasakah Governorate, Syria.
