= Adam, Oman =

Adam
- Location in Oman
- Coordinates: 22°23′0″N 57°32′0″E
- Country: Oman
- Subdivision: Ad Dakhiliyah Region

Adam (Arabic: أدم) is an administrative region in Ad Dakhiliyah, in northeastern Oman. It is a wilayah in the Interior Governorate. Prominent Omani figures, including Imam Ahmad bin Said, the founder of the Al Busaidi dynasty, originated from this region. Adam serves as a gateway to Dhofar Governorate, and is surrounded by orchards irrigated by falaj. The population of Adam is estimated to be around 20,000 people.

== Etymology ==
The region is named after the phrase "Adim al-Ard" which some say refers to the surface shape of the land. Others say this refers to the fertile land located in the middle of the desert. People commonly refer to it as "Al Sakbiyah" due to its fertility throughout the year and influx of guests

== Location ==
The total area of the state is estimated to be about 15,000 square kilometers, of which the desert occupies a large portion. The state of Adam is located in the southernmost part of the Interior Governorate and is considered its main gateway from the south. Due to its strategic location, the (Nizwa - Salalah) road is a vital artery that passes through its center. It is approximately 225 kilometers from Muscat Governorate, 860 kilometers from Dhofar Governorate, and about 76 kilometers from Nizwa State. It is bordered by the states of Nizwa and Manah to the north, Haima and Mahout to the south, Al-Mudhaibi to the east, and Bahla and Ibri to the west.

== History ==
The history of the Wilayat of Adam dates back to pre-Islamic times. Adam has several meanings in Arabic but most likely means the fertile land. The most notable places are Harrat Al Ain, Harrat al Bousaid, Harrat Al Hawashim, and Harrat Bani Shiban, where several archeological sites have been found, and Harrat Al Jami, which is more recent. The town is 295 km (183 mi) from Muscat on the Salalah road, at the southernmost end of Dakhiliya's border with Sharqiya region. It is the last green oasis before the desert. Here you can see ancient forts, citadels and towers, mosques and deserted traditional souqs. Adam is adjacent to Manah and Bahla to the north, Mahout and Haima in the Al Wusta region to the south, Wilayat Ibri of the Dhahirah region to the southwest and Wilayat at Mudhaibi of the Sharqiya region to the east. Its population numbers 13,000 in 60 villages.

Yaqut al-Hamawi, in his book "Mu'jam al-Buldan" (Dictionary of Countries), described it as "Adam, with the opening of its first and second letters, from the northern regions of Amman." Adam was a center for the convergence of trade caravans coming from the Levant and vice versa during the pre-Islamic era. Sources mention that the Bani Shayban neighborhood was a center for these traders, and this is supported by the discovery of artifacts during the restoration of a mosque near the area, such as swords, horse bridles, and roosters. Its history dates back to the time of the Yarubids.

== Affiliated Villages ==
There are 59 villages in the state of Adam, 24 of which are located within the state center. The most important of these are the areas of Harat Bani Shibban, Al Rahba, Al Sileel, Al Jamea, Hisn Al Hawashim, Al Rughah, Hala Al Awasim, Al Nahda, Al Alaya, Al Qalaa, Al Sha'abiyah, Al Samirat, Harat Bani WaelHarat Bani Wael, and Al Mukhtabiyah, Harat Al Anab, Hay Al Sakbiyah, and Al Baysitin.

Of the villages outside the state centre, the most important of which are Sana'a, Al Sameti, Al Hajr, Al Hadithah, Qarn Al Alam, Al Ghayzaranah, Wadi Halfin, Al Haqf, Ras Al Jabal, and Al Ghabaytah.

== Prominent figures ==
Many prominent scholars have emerged from the state of Adam's history:

- Ahmed bin Said Al Busaidi, the grandfather of the ruling family and the founder of the Al Busaidi dynasty, left the state and moved to the state of Sohar, where his house still stands today.
- Darwish bin Jumah Al Mahrouqi, the author of the book "Al-Dalail fi Al-Lawazim wa Al-Masa'il" (The Evidence on Obligations and Issues), was born in the Al Rughah region, died there, and was buried in a cemetery named after him.
- Sheikh Al-Faqih Ali bin Said Al Mahrouqi

== Historical monuments ==
The Al-Jami Mosque, which was built during the Azd period in 717 AD, located in the Al-Busaidi Mosque area, is an architectural masterpiece and a landmark for artistic advancement in the field of architectural engineering. It is also evidence of the Omani people's interest in mosques throughout Al-Ghubra. Other notable mosques in the area include the Al-Mahlabiya bint Abi Safra Mosque, Al-Rahba Mosque, Al-Ghariqa Mosque, Al-Hawashim Mosque, Al-Shabana Mosque, and Al-Rawgha Mosque. Additionally, the region is characterized by the presence of several ancient mud-brick alleys with exquisite architectural designs that have made them withstand natural forces. Among the most important of these alleys are Bani Shiban Alley, Al-Jami Alley, Al-Hawashim Alley, Mabirz Alley, and Al-Majabira Alley.

=== Old lanes ===
- Harat Bani Shayban: This neighborhood is considered the oldest and most prestigious in the province, and it has an ancient market.
- Harat Al-Busa'id: One of the ancient neighborhoods in the province where the founder of the Busaid state was born.
- Harat Al-Majabira: It is one of the oldest neighborhoods in the province, and the Majabira Tower stands tall in it, built in the 18th century.
- Harat Mabirz: One of the oldest and neighborhoods, preceded by the famous Rahba Mosque in the province, and the Rahba Tower stands tall in it.
- Harat Al-Souq: It is characterized by its beautiful character and includes several beautiful old buildings.

Among the old and well-known neighborhoods in the province are Harat Bani Wael and Harat Al-Hawashim.

=== Forts and Castles ===
Adam Castle, which was built during the reign of the Ya'aribah dynasty and is located in the heart of the province, is considered a complete heritage landmark. It was established to serve as the seat of government, the residence of the governor, and a place for teaching Sharia law. Due to the strategic location of the province, it was occasionally subjected to tribal harassment, as the tribes coveted its resources. This led the locals to establish fortresses, namely, the Fort of Falaj Al Ain, located on the outskirts of the province from the north, and the Fort of Falaj Al Malih, located on the outskirts of the province from the west. All of these fortresses are situated on the heads of the springs to prevent attackers from gaining control over the water sources of the province.

The ancient defensive fortifications in the state of Adam in the Interior Governorate vary between watchtowers, dawawis, and gates at the entrances of alleys, in addition to the towers and walls surrounding the alleys of the state.

The towers built with mud or Omani stone or both together are a testament to the architectural heritage of the state, where approximately 34 towers have been recorded in different areas of the state, and some of them are still standing to this day. Some of the towers include:

- Rahba Tower
- Majabira Tower

=== Cemeteries ===
In the state, there are many graves, the most important of which is Al-Eidain Cemetery, located east of Bani Shibban neighborhood, where Sheikh Drouish bin Jumah Al-Mahrouqi was buried. There is also Al-Aqiq Cemetery, Al-Zabar Cemetery, and Al-Sharm Cemetery.

== Climate ==
Climate data for Adam (Adam Airport), elevation 328 m (1,076 ft), (1991–2020 normals, extremes 2002–2021)
Month	Jan	Feb	Mar	Apr	May	Jun	Jul	Aug	Sep	Oct	Nov	Dec	Year
Record high °C (°F)	32.9 (91.2)	37.6 (99.7)	40.6 (105.1)	43.5 (110.3)	50.2 (122.4)	49.8 (121.6)	50.2 (122.4)	48.2 (118.8)	45.9 (114.6)	43.3 (109.9)	37.8 (100.0)	35.7 (96.3)	50.2 (122.4)
Mean daily maximum °C (°F)	27.0 (80.6)	29.7 (85.5)	33.9 (93.0)	38.2 (100.8)	42.0 (107.6)	44.0 (111.2)	43.9 (111.0)	42.6 (108.7)	40.4 (104.7)	37.6 (99.7)	32.2 (90.0)	28.6 (83.5)	36.7 (98.0)
Daily mean °C (°F)	20.2 (68.4)	22.6 (72.7)	26.2 (79.2)	31.0 (87.8)	34.5 (94.1)	36.1 (97.0)	35.6 (96.1)	34.0 (93.2)	32.6 (90.7)	29.9 (85.8)	25.5 (77.9)	21.7 (71.1)	29.2 (84.5)
Mean daily minimum °C (°F)	13.7 (56.7)	15.5 (59.9)	18.7 (65.7)	23.1 (73.6)	26.7 (80.1)	28.4 (83.1)	27.9 (82.2)	26.5 (79.7)	25.1 (77.2)	22.4 (72.3)	19.0 (66.2)	15.3 (59.5)	21.9 (71.4)
Record low °C (°F)	8.0 (46.4)	5.4 (41.7)	10.2 (50.4)	16.1 (61.0)	19.6 (67.3)	23.8 (74.8)	23.5 (74.3)	21.3 (70.3)	21.4 (70.5)	17.8 (64.0)	14.0 (57.2)	9.3 (48.7)	5.4 (41.7)
Average precipitation mm (inches)	4.8 (0.19)	7.8 (0.31)	23.3 (0.92)	15.0 (0.59)	12.9 (0.51)	24.0 (0.94)	5.9 (0.23)	20.5 (0.81)	12.6 (0.50)	2.5 (0.10)	0.9 (0.04)	4.8 (0.19)	135 (5.33)
Average precipitation days (≥ 1.0 mm)	0.5	0.7	1.4	1.6	1.1	2.5	1.0	2.4	1.8	0.5	0.3	0.4	14.2
Source: Starlings Roost Weather

== See also ==
- List of cities in Oman
