= Al Awabi =

Al Awabi العوابي
- Wilayat
- Interactive map of Al Awabi
- Country: Oman
- Governorate: Al Batinah
- Province: Al Awabi

Population (2020)
  - Total: 18,833

Al Awabi is one of the 62 provinces (wilayat) of Oman. It is located in Al Batinah Region, in the north of Oman. Based on the figures of the 2020 census, Al Awabi is home for 18,833 people, compared to 10,469 in 2003. It has 32 villages.

== Location ==
Al Awabi is approximately 156 km from the capital city, Muscat, 16 km from Rustaq, and 36 km from Nakhal.

== General Information ==
Al Awabi is a quiet town surrounded by a chain of high mountains. Extraordinary rock formations can be seen in Wadi Bani Kharus gorge in the Al Hajar Mountains. Wadi Bani Kharus is a 26-km long wadi that goes deep in the mountains and finally ends at Jebel Akhdar, the highest summit in Oman. Wadi Bani Kharus is famous for its rich heritage, and history. Its villages, surrounded by mountains, are well known for their picturesque character.

Al Awabi has a number of tourist destinations, such as Al Elya village, which is the final station in Wadi Bani Kharus, which itself is a noted tourist destination. There is also the Castle of Awabi, which was built almost 200 years ago and restored in 2008, and Subaikha village which is classified as a natural reserve, and is around 20 km away from Al Awabi town centre.

A number of agricultural products are grown in Al Awabi other than dates (palm trees), such as mango, orange, lime, pomegranates, banana, Guava, and figs as well as common vegetables.

As of 2006, Al Awabi had 8 schools and a hospital (with 18 beds) and a health center.

== An Icon for writing ==
Al Awabi is known for its icon which is a traditional pen and inkwell, which is a sign for the historical significance of the province when it comes writing on rock slates, which is an old art mastered by the people of Al Awabi, this resulted in conservation of historical events and documents from past ages which makes this province stand out from its surroundings in this manner.

== Agriculture ==
Al Awabi in an interior province with no sea or river surrounding it, therefore the people had to rely on agriculture for their living, and in a true Omani fashion, Falajs are well used in the area, having 47 running falajs to water the farms helped with the growth of agriculture in Al Awabi. As for the products that are grown in Al Awabi other than dates (palm trees), such as mango, orange, lime, pomegranates, banana, Guava, and figs as well as common vegetables.

== Population ==
Wilayat Al Awabi
Year	Total Population
2011	12,592
2012	13,363
2013	14,128
2014	14,702
2015	15,254
2016	16,075
2017	16,703
2018	17,032
2019	17,453
2020	18,833
