= Bahla =

- Town
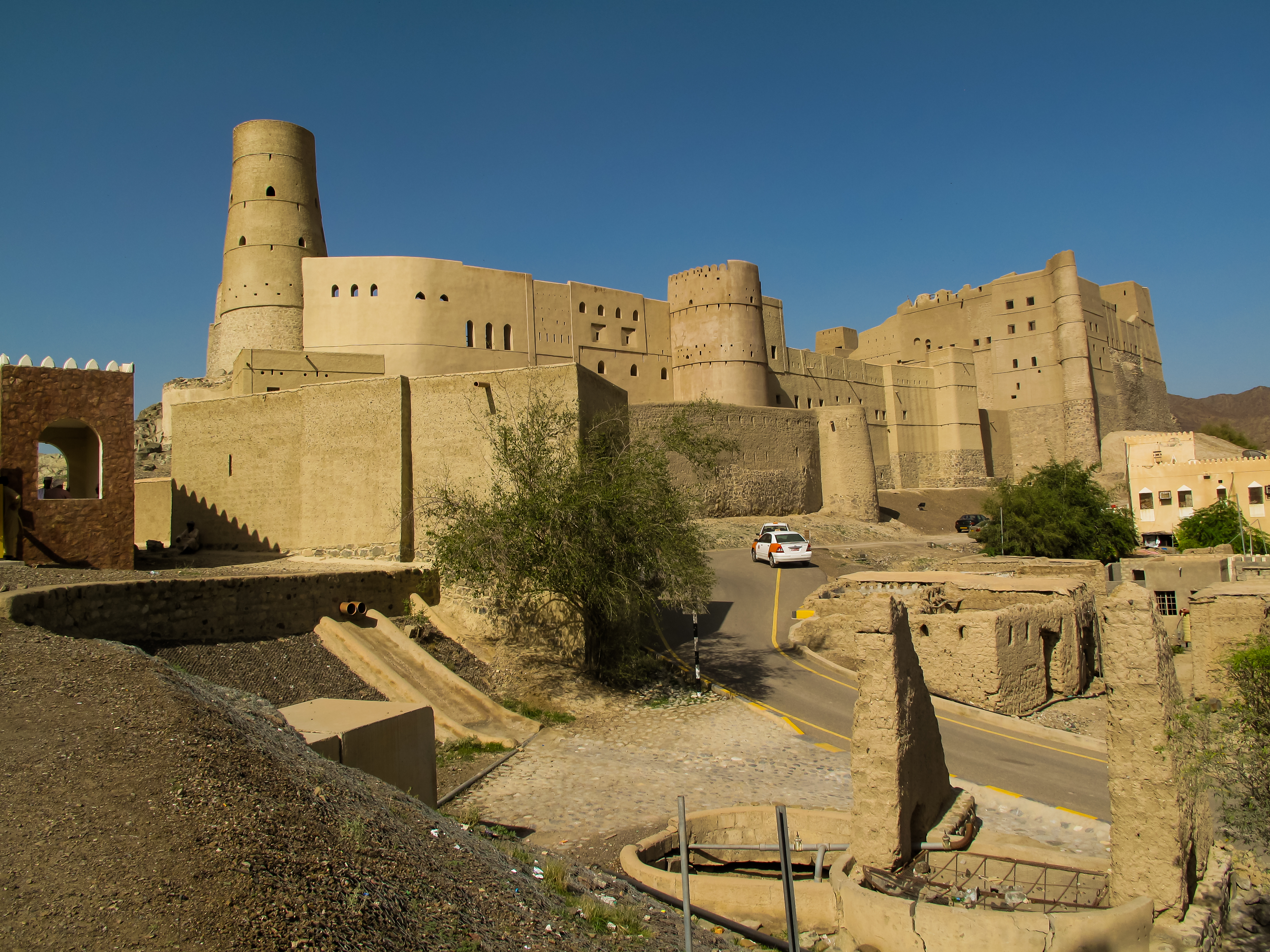
- Bahla Fort, a UNESCO World Heritage Site

- Location in Oman
- Coordinates: 22°58′4.8″N 57°17′52.8″E
- Country: Oman
- Region: Ad Dakhiliyah Region
- Elevation: 1,800 ft (550 m)

Population
  - Total: 85,000
- Time zone: UTC+4 (+4)

Bahla (Arabic: بهلاء, romanized: Bahlāʿ) is a town, located 40 km away from Nizwa, and about 200 km from Oman's capital Muscat which lies in the Ad Dakhiliyah Governorate of Oman. It is notable as the home of one of the oldest fortresses in the country, the 13th-century Bahla Fort, which is a UNESCO World Heritage Site. The fortress and the town are enclosed by extensive remnants of a 12 km-long (7.5 mi) fortified wall. Most buildings are constructed of traditional mud brick, many of them are hundreds of years old.

A short distance beyond Bahla lies the Castle of Jabreen, a massive three-story structure built during Al Ya'ruba dynasty in the mid-17th century. The castle is an example of Islamic architecture with wooden inscriptions and paintings on its ceilings.

== History ==
Bahla’s long history goes back to 3000 BC, and in past centuries Bahla bore witness to many important historical events, some of which are recorded in historical accounts while others are still unknown. Bahla was used as the Nabāhina’s second capital city, after Nizwa, during the first period of their dynasty (549–906 AH / 1154–1500 AD) and then became the main capital during their second period (964–1034 AH / 1556–1624 A). The Omani civilization dates back thousands of years. In ancient times the country was the hub of the rich trade in frankincense, the aromatic gum which was once considered more precious than gold. Known for their seafaring tradition, the Sultans of Oman ruled over a wealthy trading empire that stretched from the coast of East Africa to the tip of the Indian subcontinent from the 16th to the 19th centuries. At the foot of Djebel Akhdar lie the fortresses of Rustaq to the north, and Izki, Nizwa and Bahla to the south. These have all been capitals at some time in their history, and as a consequence have played an important role in the history of Oman. It was here that the Kharijite communities resisted all attempts at ‘normalization’ by Caliph Harun Al-Rashid, and put into practice their religious concepts, which were at once radically puritanical and democratic. Not far from the capital of Oman, the oasis of Bahla owed its prosperity to the Banu Nabhan who, from the mid-12th to the end of the 15th centuries, imposed their rule on the other tribes. Only the ruins of what was a glorious past now remain in this magnificent mountain site. Built on a stone base, the adobe walls and towers of the immense fort probably include some structural elements of the pre-Islamic period, but the major part of the constructions dates from the prosperous time of the Banu Nabhan, with the latest reconstruction dating from the beginning of the 16th century. At the foot of the fort, to the south-west, lies the Friday Mosque with its beautiful sculpted mihrab (prayer niche) probably dating back to the 14th century.

== Attractions ==
=== Bahla Fort ===
Bahla fort is a fine example of a defensive complex engineered to enable the tribes settled there to survive, prosper and carry out their trade during the medieval Islamic period. It was built in the 13th century. The fort had come under the threat of losing its authenticity as many modern ways of restorations were being used. Now the fort is thriving more than ever and is the major attraction of the Bahla oasis settlement. It is also one of the largest forts in Oman. The fort has a reputation among the locals for hosting paranormal activities at night. This may not come as a shock as Bahla is believed to be the birthplace of Black Magic.

The oasis of Bahla owes its prosperity to the Banu Nebhan, the dominant tribe in the area from the 12th to the end of the 15th century. The ruins of the immense fort, with its walls and towers of unbaked brick and its stone foundations, is a remarkable example of this type of fortification and attests to the power of the Banu Nebhan.

=== Jabrin Castle ===
The beautiful castle of Jabrin is located 5 kilometers to the southwest of Bahla. It was the residence of Imam Sultan bin Saif Al Ya'arubi during the late 15th century. It was also the centre for studying medicine, astrology and Islam. Interiors of the castle are decorated with intricate carvings and paintings on the ceilings. There are many ornamental flowers decorating the interiors of the Jabrin Castle. The tomb of Imam Sultan bin Saif Al Ya'arubi is also enclosed within the fort.

=== Old Bahla Souq ===
The old souq is right across the main road that leads to the fort. There are a number of shops here selling mostly pottery items, silver artefacts and other traditional handcrafted items.

== Lifestyle ==
Bahla was used for many purposes due to the existence of its Qur’anic schools and mosques, and was renowned as a centre for intellectuals with many famous imams and scholars who influenced the political and intellectual scene in Oman. Among these were Abu ‘Ubaidah Abdullah bin al-Qāsim (2nd century AH/8th century AD), al-Ṣalt bin Khamis al-Kharūṣi (3rd century AH/9th century AD) and Sheikh Mohammed ibn Barakah (4th century AH/10th century AD). In fact, historical accounts indicate that ibn Barakah’s school attracted students from the Arab Maghreb countries. Among Bahla’s famous intellects were Mohammed bin Sulaiman bin Ahmed bin Mfarraj (9th century AH/15th century AD) and Aisha bint Rashid bin Khaṣīb al-Riyami (12th century AH/18th century AD).

== Pottery in Bahla ==
Pottery in Bahla dates back to as early as 2500 BC. The clay used comes from the wadi (river bed). Men trample on this to make the clay pliable so it can be worked on. After the object is finished, it is placed in a kiln to be fired.

== Transport ==
Since Bahla is a small fortified settlement, one can walk around the whole oasis to get from one end to the other. A single road cuts into the settlement leading to the fort entrance.

== Climate ==
Bahla has a hot desert climate (BWh) according to the Köppen climate classification.

Climate data for Bahla, elevation 592 m (1,942 ft), (1991–2020 normals, extremes 2002–2022)
Month	Jan	Feb	Mar	Apr	May	Jun	Jul	Aug	Sep	Oct	Nov	Dec	Year
Record high °C (°F)	31.9 (89.4)	36.2 (97.2)	40.5 (104.9)	42.2 (108.0)	48.1 (118.6)	48.4 (119.1)	46.8 (116.2)	46.5 (115.7)	44.5 (112.1)	41.7 (107.1)	36.2 (97.2)	32.9 (91.2)	48.4 (119.1)
Mean daily maximum °C (°F)	25.5 (77.9)	28.0 (82.4)	32.2 (90.0)	36.5 (97.7)	40.3 (104.5)	42.8 (109.0)	42.5 (108.5)	41.4 (106.5)	39.4 (102.9)	36.0 (96.8)	30.6 (87.1)	27.1 (80.8)	35.2 (95.3)
Daily mean °C (°F)	19.3 (66.7)	21.6 (70.9)	25.6 (78.1)	30.2 (86.4)	34.0 (93.2)	35.8 (96.4)	35.6 (96.1)	34.0 (93.2)	32.5 (90.5)	29.6 (85.3)	24.8 (76.6)	20.7 (69.3)	28.6 (83.6)
Mean daily minimum °C (°F)	12.6 (54.7)	14.7 (58.5)	18.3 (64.9)	22.9 (73.2)	26.6 (79.9)	28.6 (83.5)	28.7 (83.7)	27.4 (81.3)	25.7 (78.3)	22.5 (72.5)	18.4 (65.1)	14.1 (57.4)	21.7 (71.1)
Record low °C (°F)	6.1 (43.0)	4.7 (40.5)	9.6 (49.3)	16.6 (61.9)	18.6 (65.5)	23.0 (73.4)	22.8 (73.0)	22.2 (72.0)	20.8 (69.4)	16.7 (62.1)	12.6 (54.7)	8.3 (46.9)	4.7 (40.5)
Average precipitation mm (inches)	6.6 (0.26)	4.2 (0.17)	11.3 (0.44)	12.3 (0.48)	7.6 (0.30)	9.4 (0.37)	8.7 (0.34)	12.6 (0.50)	7.4 (0.29)	2.8 (0.11)	1.6 (0.06)	3.6 (0.14)	88.1 (3.46)
Source 1: World Meteorological Organization (precipitation 1998–2009)
Source 2: Starlings Roost Weather

== Gallery ==
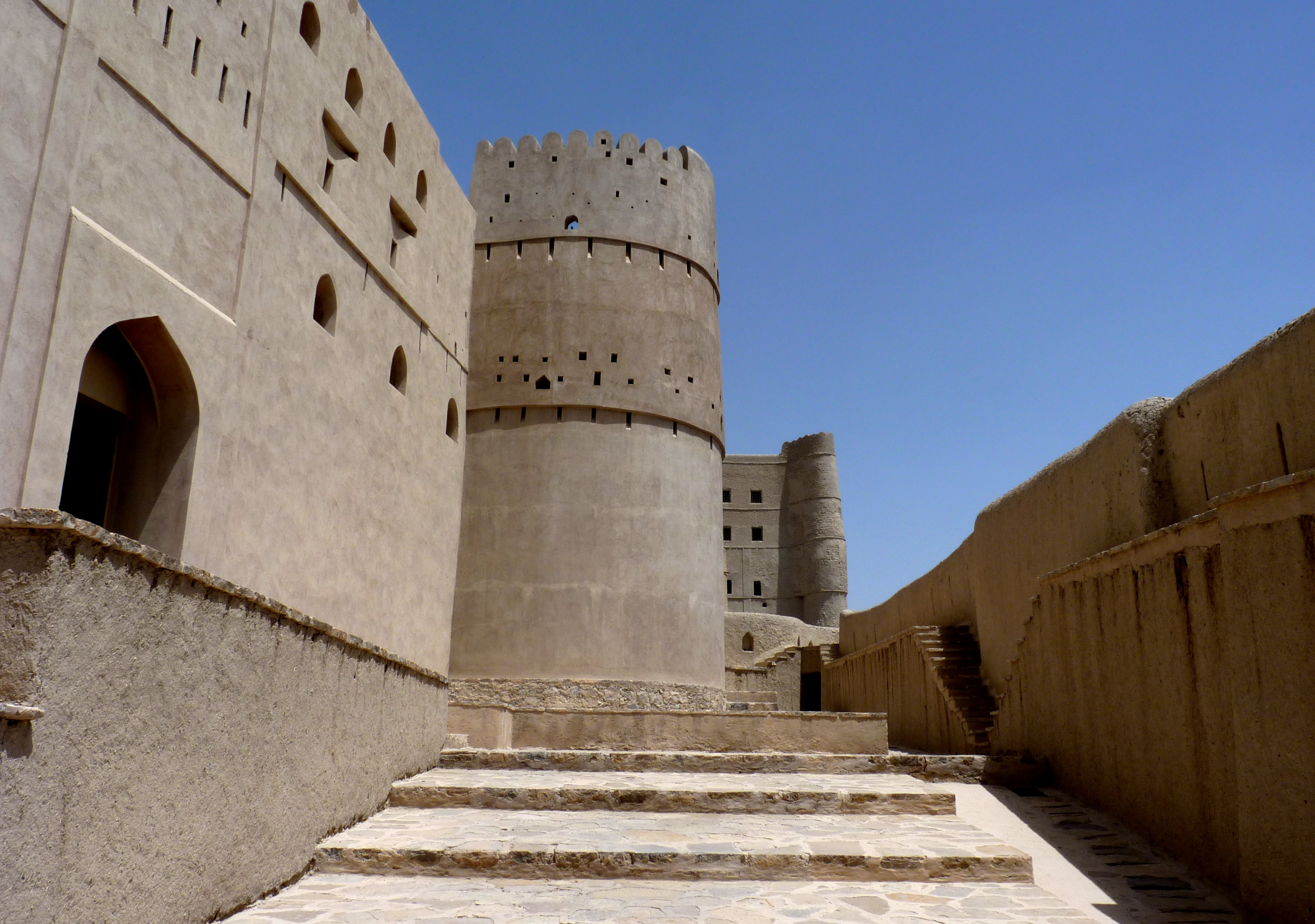

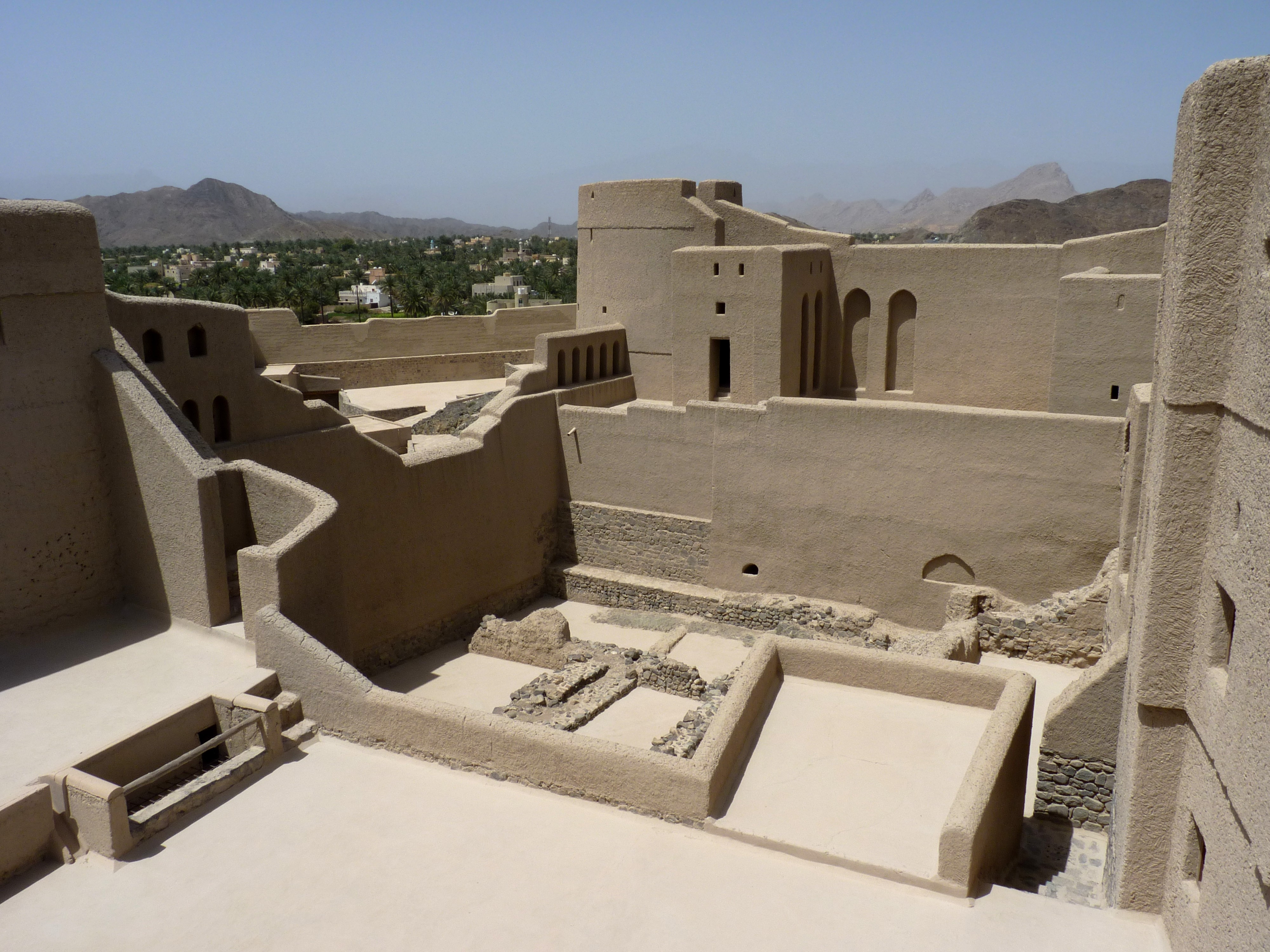

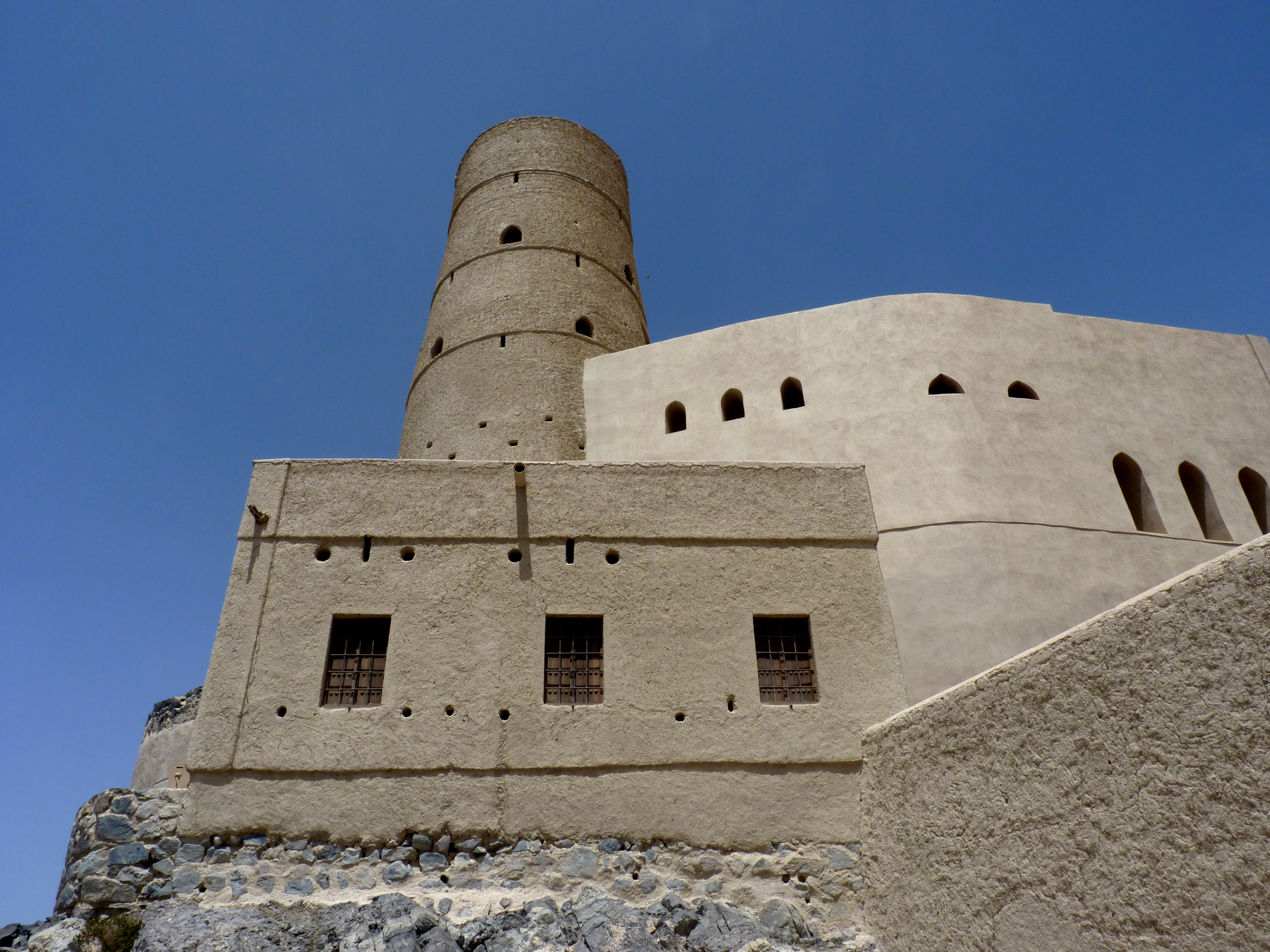

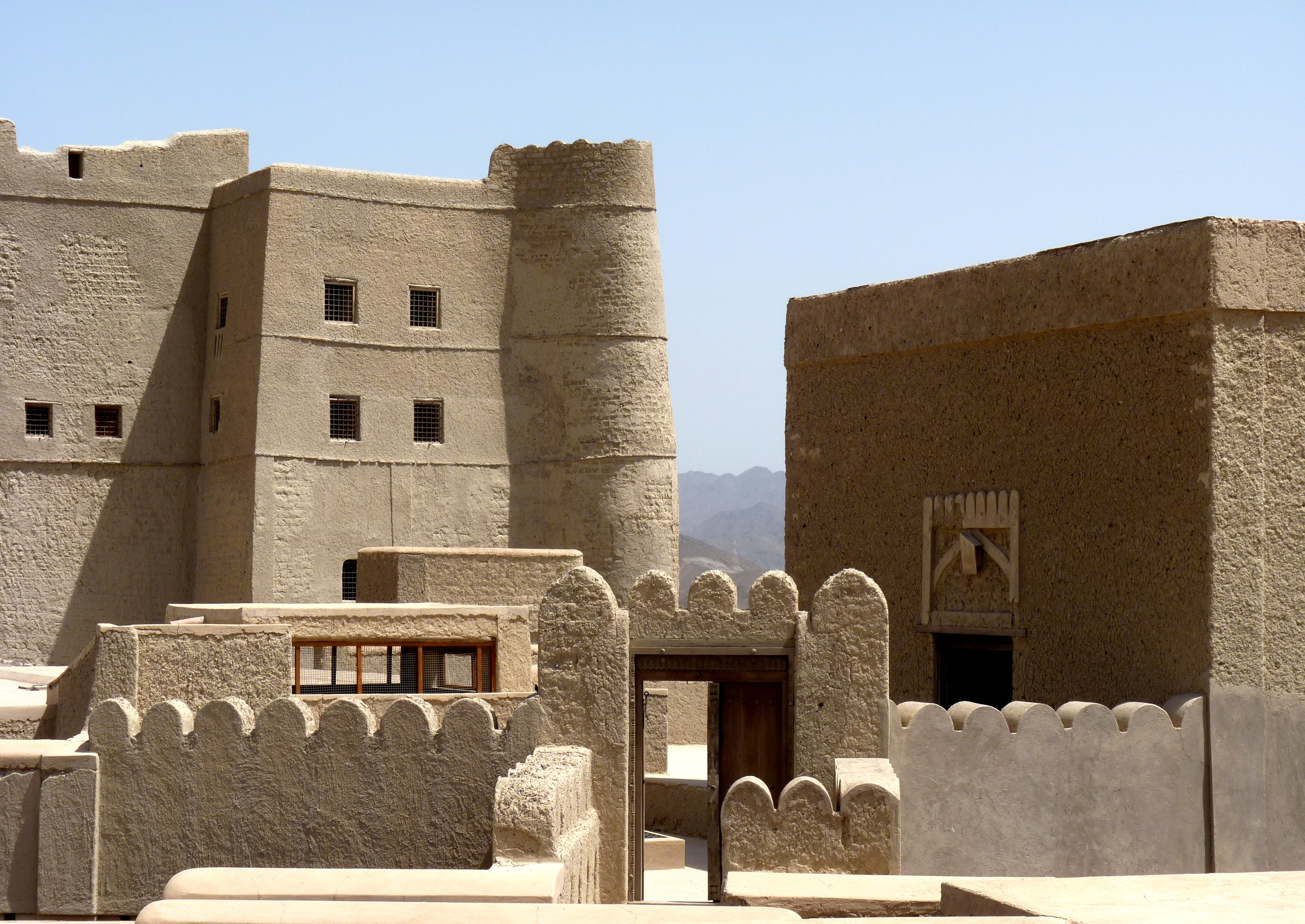

== See also ==
- List of cities in Oman
