= Yanqul =

Yanqul ينقل
- Wilayat
- Interactive map of Yanqul
- Country: Oman
- Governorate: Al Dhahirah
- Province: Yanqul

Area
  - Total: 1,252 km^{2} (483 sq mi)

Population (2020)
  - Total: 26,428
  - Density: 21.11/km^{2} (54.67/sq mi)

Yanqul is a province (wilayat) of Al Dhahirah Governorate in northwestern Oman.

== Geography and location ==
Yanqul is located in the Al Dhahirah Governorate in the northwestern part of Oman. Yanqul is known for its diverse geography, including rocky mountains, valleys, and desert landscapes.

== History and heritage ==
Yanqul has a rich historical heritage, and its landscape is dotted with archaeological sites. The Yanqul Fort is a prominent historical site in the wilayat. This fort is a testament to Oman's architectural and historical legacy. It was historically used for defense and governance.

Bait Al Marah Castle is a prominent fort in the Yanqul area. It is the third largest castle in Oman and is over 400 years old.

== Demographics ==
According to the 2020 Oman census, published by the National Centre for Statistics and Information, Yanqul had a population of 26,428 inhabitants. This was a big increase from the 2010 Oman census figure of 18,057 and represents a 3.9% annual population growth rate. Spanning an area of 1,252 square kilometres (483 sq mi), the province has a population density of 21.10 inhabitants per square kilometre.

Males accounted for 57.6% of the population (15,224 inhabitants), while females made up the remaining 42.4% (11,204). The population had a relatively young age structure, with 29.9% (7,904) of inhabitants children aged 14 or younger, 66.2% (17,502) between 15 and 64, and only 3.9% (1,022) aged 65 or older. The age distribution showed a marked decline among older age groups, with the population falling from 5,711 inhabitants aged 30–39 to 2,991 aged 40–49, and decreasing progressively in each subsequent age group. Omani citizens constituted 79.4% of the population (20,976 inhabitants), while foreign citizens accounted for the remaining 20.6% (5,452).

== Agriculture ==
The region benefits from natural springs, allowing for oasis farming. Date palm cultivation is a significant agricultural activity in Yanqul. Traditional aflaj (irrigation channels) systems have been employed for centuries to efficiently distribute water for agriculture. Yanqul is known for its natural springs which contribute to the fertility of the land and are important water sources for agriculture.
