= Bidbid =

- Location in Oman
- Coordinates: 23°24′47″N 58°7′27″E
- Country: Oman
- Subdivision: Ad Dakhiliyah Region

Bidbid (Arabic: بدبد) is a town in the Ad Dakhiliyah region of northeastern Oman.

Badbad is one of the states in the Interior Governorate of the Sultanate of Oman, and serves as a link among different regions in the Sultanate, including the Eastern region, Al Dhahirah, Dhofar Governorate, and the Central region.

== Geography ==
=== Location ===
The state of Bidbid is about 70 kilometers away from Muscat governorate. It overlooks the state of Samail to the south, and the states of Dama and Al Ta'ayeen to the east. It also borders Muscat governorate to the north, and is adjacent to the Al Hajar mountain range.

=== Climate ===
Climate data for Bidbid
Month	Jan	Feb	Mar	Apr	May	Jun	Jul	Aug	Sep	Oct	Nov	Dec	Year
Mean daily maximum °C (°F)	24.3 (75.7)	24.7 (76.5)	28.1 (82.6)	33.0 (91.4)	37.7 (99.9)	38.7 (101.7)	37.0 (98.6)	35.3 (95.5)	34.7 (94.5)	33.1 (91.6)	28.8 (83.8)	25.6 (78.1)	31.8 (89.2)
Mean daily minimum °C (°F)	15.9 (60.6)	16.3 (61.3)	19.4 (66.9)	23.3 (73.9)	27.4 (81.3)	29.0 (84.2)	28.6 (83.5)	27.3 (81.1)	26.0 (78.8)	23.2 (73.8)	19.2 (66.6)	16.9 (62.4)	22.7 (72.9)
Average precipitation mm (inches)	16 (0.6)	24 (0.9)	17 (0.7)	9 (0.4)	3 (0.1)	1 (0.0)	2 (0.1)	2 (0.1)	1 (0.0)	0 (0)	5 (0.2)	10 (0.4)	90 (3.5)
Source: Climate-data.org

== See also ==
- List of cities in Oman
