= Izki =

Izki Ad Dakhiliyah Oman إِزْكِي (in Arabic) Wilayat Izki
- Town
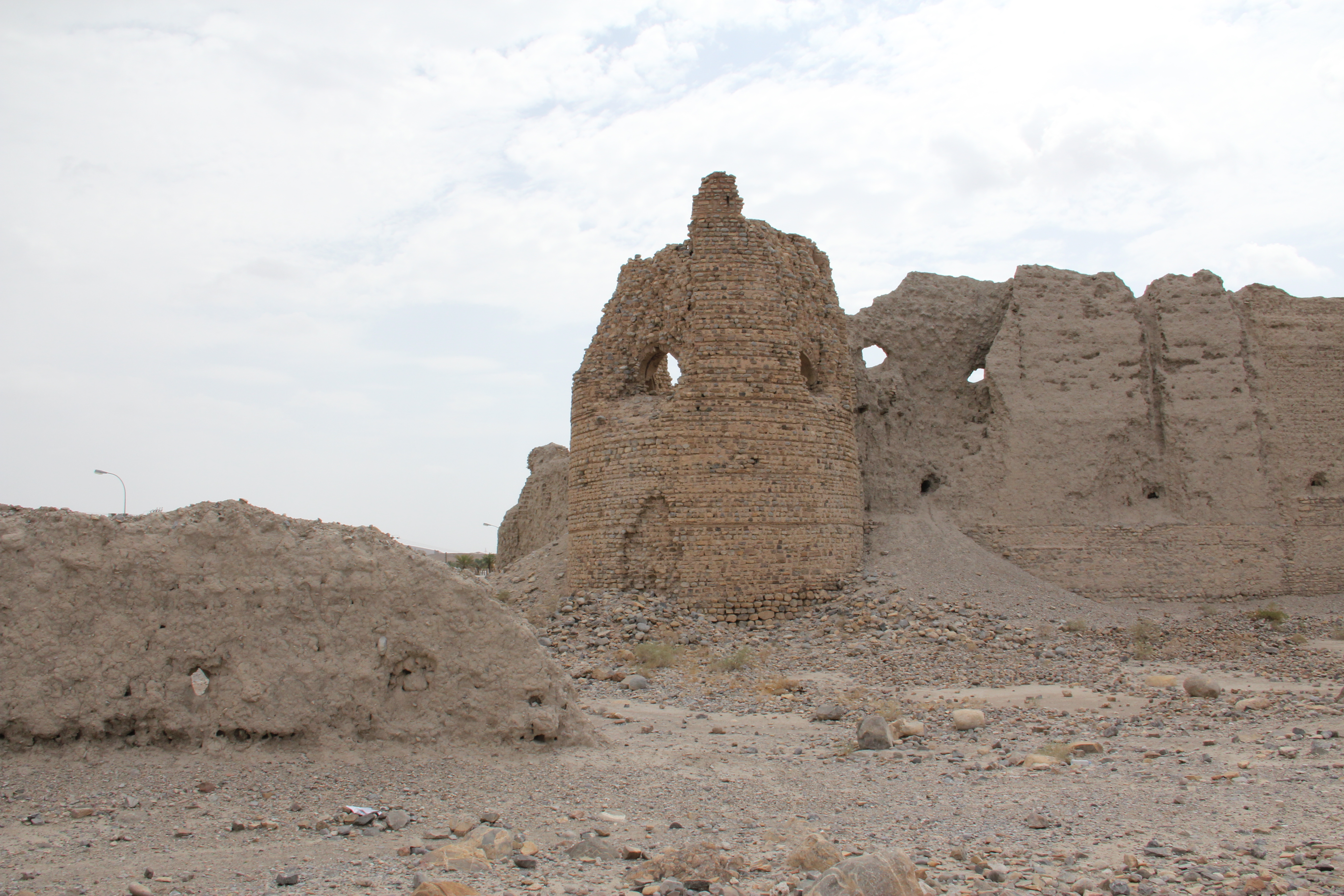
- Ruins at Izki's old city
- Nickname: Garnan
- Location in Oman
- Coordinates: 22°56′2″N 57°46′30″E
- Country: Oman
- Region: Ad Dakhiliyah Region

Population (2003)
  - Total: 35,173
- Time zone: UTC+4 (Oman Standard Time)

Izki (Arabic: إِزْكِي) is a town in the Ad Dakhiliyah region of northeastern Oman. It is located at c. 544 m (1,785 ft) altitude, and has a population of 35,173 (2003 census).

The archaeological landmarks are still evidence of the ancient heritage of the state, where there are about 142 towers, and three castles, one of which is "Al Awamir Castle" and two castles in the town of "Al Qaryatayn", in addition to the presence of a number of archaeological houses, the most important of which are "Al Nazar and Al Yamin", along with a large fortress that was built during the reign of Said bin Sultan and some parts of it have been demolished due to the passage of time and erosion factors.

== Location ==
One of the states in the Interior Governorate. It is bordered by Al Jabal Al Akhdar to the west, and by the states of Manah and Nizwa to the west and south. It is bordered by the state of Samail to the north and by the state of Al Mudhaibi in the North Eastern Governorate to the east. Its area is approximately 2500 square kilometers and it is about 138 kilometers away from the capital, Muscat. It has adopted the Royal Canal as its emblem.

== History ==
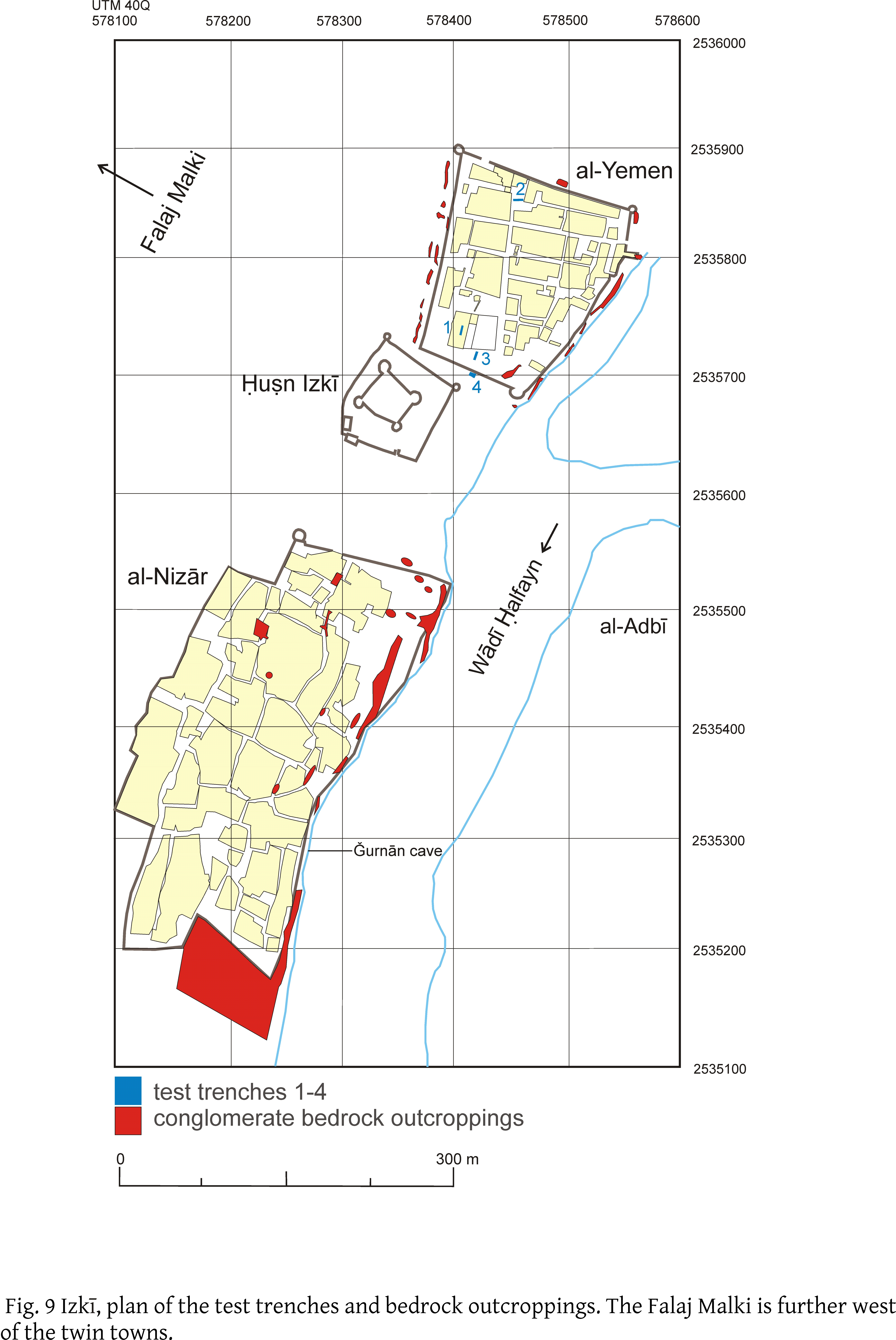
Plan of Old Izki al-Yemen, al-Nizar and the Yaruba fort between them. The red colour shows stone outcroppings. The blue shows the four trenches excavated in 2011.

Legendarily, Izki is Oman's oldest city. Popularly revered 'oldest cities' are claimed the world over, the historicity of which usually rests on local pride. Its ancient aflaj (water canals) probably nourished such beliefs. The twin walled towns, Izki/al-Yemen and al-Nizar, differ from each other in size and appearance. The former presently has half of the surface area as the latter. In 1908, the estimated number of houses in al-Nizar was 450, and in al-Yemen, it was 350, which contradicts this. Al-Nizar is still inhabited; al-Yemen has been deserted since prior to 1980, but the owners still care for their own houses. The present appearance, especially the regular streets, results from the 18th century destruction and rebuilding of al-Yemen.

Early Iron Age Izki appears to find mention in cuneiform texts. According to Neoassyrian sources, in 640 BCE, "Pade, king of Qade, who lives in Izke…sent envoys to cultivate good relations [and a state contract] burdened with gifts. They travelled six months, came to me [Aššurbanipal], asked of my condition and beseeched my rule." Some believe that Izki was mentioned in Neoassyrian cuneiform texts from Nineveh.

Serious archaeological fieldwork began in Izki with J. Schreiber (2007). He strove to contextualise this centre amongst other large oases in Oman by means of archaeological survey. In order to reach this goal, he studied the different contexts of key sites in Central Oman first hand as a pottery specialist. The poor preservation of such continuously occupied sites scared off most archaeologists. In his survey J. Schreiber tallied in and immediately around the old twin towns 1045 sites (2007: 124) ranging from the Hafit to Islamic periods.

In 2011, excavation and survey partly confirmed Schreiber's results. The town contains the remains of the entire pre-Islamic period. Numerous were the finds of the Early Iron Age and Late Iron Age. Particularly eroded and disturbed was al-Nizar. Excavation of the highest part of Al-Yemen revealed an older mosque, presumably that destroyed during the civil war (886-970 AD).

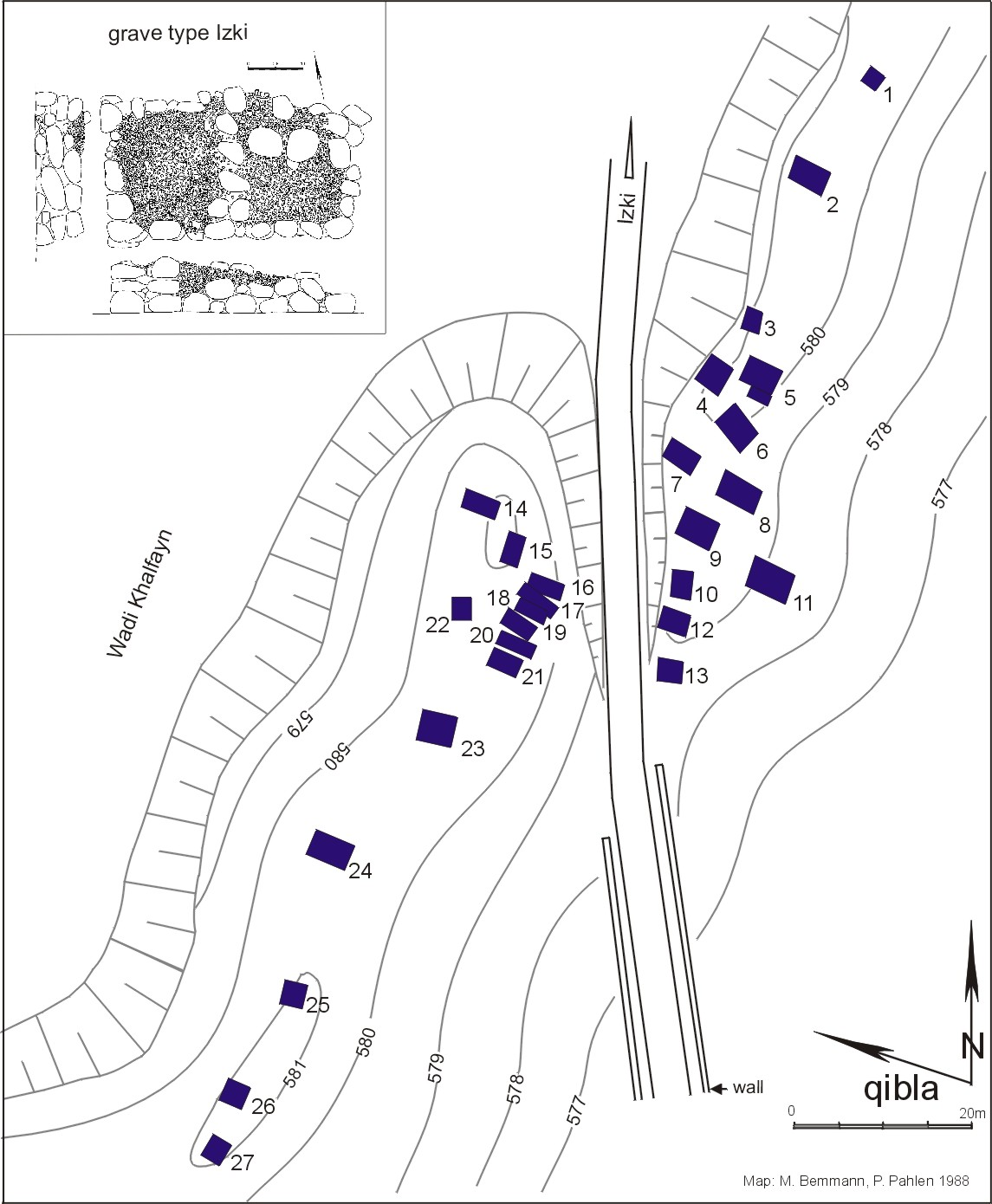
Ancient Arabian cemetery containing Late Iron Age graves on the eastern side of the Wadi Khalfayn

On the other side of the Wadi Khalfayn lies a large cemetery which contains pottery sherds of the Samad Late Iron Age, but of other periods as well. The graves are mostly of this period.

== Attractions ==
One of the most prominent tourist attractions in the state is "Al Maliki Canal", which gained its name from Malik bin Fahm Al Azdi, as well as "Ghar Wajranan", which is surrounded by many intertwined stories between reality and fiction.

=== Zakiet Archaeological Tombs ===
Located in the Al-Dakhiliyah Governorate, historians say that they date back to the 3rd millennium BC. The Zakiet archaeological tombs are situated on a cylindrical-shaped hill overlooking the village. They consist of two walls made of mountain rocks resembling the shape of a beehive cell. The presence of tombs on the top of the hill leads researchers to believe that the site was used as a fortress to repel invading armies.

=== Jarnan Cave ===
Jarnan Cave is located in the Azki state and dates back to the pre-Islamic era. It is situated on an unstable rocky hill, overlooking the ancient neighborhood of Al-Nazar. The cave was named Jarnan after the old name of the state in the pre-Islamic era. The entrance to the cave is in front of the Halfeen Valley. It was previously said that a person could only enter the cave by crawling, but due to erosion, these openings have become almost invisible.

The length of the cave extends from approximately 15 to 20 meters. Many stories circulate about Jarnan Cave, although many locals deny their validity.

The legends say that the people of Azki used to worship an idol in the form of a golden calf named Jarnan, adorned with jewelry and precious gems. When the people of Azki embraced Islam, the calf was hidden inside a cave beneath the village of Nazar, and it was guarded by magical incantations. Since that day, no one has seen the calf.

== Demographics ==
The total population of the state of Izki is 36,296 people, consisting of 4,492 families according to the National Center for Statistics and Information for the year 2012. The majority of them are Sunni Muslims. Some of its popular and traditional arts include Razha, Al-Azi, sword fighting, and Ta'awib, which is one of the women's arts.

== Traditional Crafts and Industries ==
These include leather tanning, spinning, weaving, silverware manufacturing, palm weaving, as well as trade, construction, woodworking, and blacksmithing.

== Service Institutions ==
It has 20 schools at all educational levels, and several government offices that provide necessary services to the population. It also has a center for agricultural development, a municipal center, an electricity office, a post office, a police center, a Sharia court, an office for the governor, as well as tourist parks, restaurants, and recreational places.

== Sources ==
- D.T. Potts From Qadê to Mazûn: Four Notes on Oman, c. 700 to 700 AD, Journal of Oman Studies 8.1, 1985, 81–95.
- Juergen Schreiber, Transformationsprozesse in Oasensiedlungen Omans. Die Vorislamische Zeit am Beispiel Von Izki, Nizwa und dem Jebel Akhdar, internet dissertation, Munich 2007.

URL: http://edoc.ub.uni-muenchen.de/7548/

- Paul Yule, Cross-roads – Early and Late Iron Age South-eastern Arabia, Abhandlungen Deutsche Orient-Gesellschaft, vol. 30, Wiesbaden 2014, 29-30 Fig. 10 ISBN 978-3-447-10127-1
- Paul Yule, Excavation and Prospection in Izkī and Neighbouring Areas of Central Oman 2011, in Archaeological Research in the Sultanate of Oman, Der Anschnitt, 2015, 179‒203.
