= Ad Dakhiliyah Governorate =

Governorate of Oman

Coordinates: 22°N 57°E

Ad Dakhiliyah محافظة الداخلية
- Governorate
- Ad Dakhiliyah, Governorate of Oman
- Country: Oman
- Capital: Nizwa

Government
  - Governor: Hilal bin Said bin Hamdan Al Hajri

Area
  - Total: 31,900 km^{2} (12,300 sq mi)

Population (2020)
  - Total: 478,500
  - Density: 15.0/km^{2} (38.8/sq mi)
- ISO 3166 code: OM-DA

Ad Dakhiliyah (Arabic: الداخلية, romanized: Ad-Dāḫilīyah, lit. 'The Interior') is one of the eleven governorates (muhafazah) of Oman with Nizwa town as the regional center. It was previously a region (mintaqah). It became a governorate on 28 October 2011.

== Provinces ==
Ad Dakhiliyah Governorate consists of nine provinces (wilayat):

- Nizwa
- Samail
- Bahla
- Adam
- Al Hamra
- Manah
- Izki
- Bid Bid
- Jebel Akhdar

== Demographics ==
Historical population
Census year	Pop.	±% p.a.
1993	229,791	—
2003	267,140	+1.52%
2010	326,651	+2.91%
2020	478,501	+3.89%
Source: Citypopulation

As of April 2024, 71.4% of the population are Omani nationals and 28.6% are expatriates.
