= Manah, Oman =

Manah منح
- Town
- Location in Oman
- Coordinates: 22.791°N 57.587°E
- Country: Oman
- Subdivision: Ad Dakhiliyah Region

Population (2010)
  - Total: 7,749

Manah (Arabic: منح) is a town in the region of Ad Dakhiliyah, in northeastern Oman. As of 2010 it had a population of 7,749.

Manah is one of the wilayats (provinces) in the Interior Governorate of Oman, located approximately 160km away from the capital, Muscat. According to the 2010 census, its population was around 7,749. It is bordered by Adam to the south, Izki to the east and north, and Nizwa to the west.

The wilayat includes several historical forts, the most important of which are Al-Fiqain Fort, Al-Bilad Fort, and another fort in the town of Ma'mad. It also has many archaeological sites, such as the ancient fortress in Al-Ma'di town and the old mosque, which dates back to the time of Imam Omar bin Al-Khattab Al-Khuraisi. These landmarks, including the Sharah Mosque, were all restored during the reign of Sultan Qaboos bin Said.

Manah wilayat has various tourist attractions, including a spacious cave in the old town surrounded by ancient walls, a cellar in one of the old houses in Al-Fiqain town, ancient ruins in Jebel Bu Suruj, and a rock inscribed by Ibrahim "Khalil Allah" that reads: "We met in this place seventy knights, neither from Manah nor from Nizwa." In the old Az Mosque, there is a rock with a "human footprint" and a story behind it. It is said that someone took it from its place on his journey and when he reached a place in the south, he rested. When he woke up in the morning, he could not find the rock. After searching for it, he found it back in its original place. The weight of that rock is estimated to be fifty pounds, and it is still present in its original location. Additionally, Manah wilayat has two water springs (Ain Al-Bilad and Ain Al-Ma'ia) and more than thirteen aflaj (traditional irrigation channels).

== Location ==
Manah is one of the wilayats (provinces) in the Omani Interior Governorate. It occupies a unique location, as it is located 160 square kilometers from the capital, Muscat. It is surrounded by other wilayats in all directions. To the east, it is bordered by the wilayat of Izki, to the south by the wilayat of Adam, and to the northwest by the wilayats of Bahla and Nizwa. Manah is not far from the wilayats of Nizwa and Salalah, as it is located at the beginning of the road leading to them.

== History ==
The wilayat of Manah is thought to be the first resting place of Malik bin Fahim al Azdi before the Arabs entered Oman when the Marib Dam in what is today Yemen broke. A falaj in Manah still bears his name. In the old town, there are many caves which were said to be hiding places during the war for women and children. There is also a subterranean vault located in one of the ancient houses in Al Fiqin.

Legend surrounds the Az al Qadim mosque located within the town: it is said that a 100 kg rock was moved by a visitor to the mosque, which he took with him on his travels south. The next day, upon waking, the man noticed the rock had disappeared, only to be found back in the mosque. The rock still lies in the mosque and has the imprint of a man's foot on it. Sultan Qaboos' royal camp for inspection of the region of Ad Dakhliyah lies at Seih al Barakat in Manah, as does Al Shomoukh Palace.

== Monuments and landmarks ==
There are multiple archaeological sites in Manah, including three famous castles: Al-Fiqain Castle, Al-Bilad Castle, and several forts such as Al-Ma'ara Fort. There are also mosques like Al-Shara Mosque and Al-Az Mosque, and one of the most famous mosques in Manah is the Jami' Mosque, which was established by Imam Omar bin Al-Khattab Al-Khuraisi. Manah also has aflaj (traditional irrigation system) and water springs. The number of aflaj is estimated to be around thirteen, with the most prominent one being Malik Al-Mandathir Aflaj. As for the water springs in the region, there are Ain Al-Bilad and Ain Al-Almaniya. The aflaj are used for agriculture and irrigation of crops. One of its ancient treasures is Harat Al-Bilad, which was built according to a magnificent architectural design. The exterior of the neighborhood is fortified for protection, and it contains various facilities such as walls. The thickness of each wall in the neighborhood ranges from thirty centimeters to eighty centimeters, with a height of fifteen centimeters. The inner wall of the neighborhood is built with red bricks, which form the foundation of the neighborhood. The Safiya wall, however, has lost most of its landmarks, with only a few remaining. In addition to roads, mosques, castles, and several gates, there is a strong fortress located in the south of the neighborhood, which serves as an important center where the governor resides. There is also another formidable fortress known as Najad Fortress, named after Sheikh Najad bin Musa.

== Al-Fiqain Fort ==
"Qalat Al-Fiqain" in the state of Manah in the Interior Governorate is one of the prominent historical landmarks in the state that reflects the depth of traditional Omani architectural engineering in the field of building defensive fortifications. The castle stands with its towering towers in the middle of the village of Al-Fiqain.

The castle is surrounded by old houses and palm groves on all sides, casting their shadows on the place. This castle has preserved its formations and construction details for over 400 years until it was completely restored by the Ministry of Heritage and Culture and officially opened to visitors in the Heritage Year on June 24, 1994.

Khalfan bin Salem Al-Busaidi, a researcher in Omani history, says that the inscriptions and writings found at the upper gate of the castle indicate its construction date, which dates back to the year 1027 AH (1617 AD). A group of skilled engineers and experienced people from the state of Manah participated in its construction. Some imams at that time also had a role in protecting the castle, as found in some manuscripts dating back to the year 1333 AH, including a manuscript by Imam Salem bin Rashid Al-Kharousi.

The Oman News Agency adds that Qalat Al-Fiqain is known for its defense capabilities, strong construction, and ancient architectural art. Its main gate remained unknown to everyone, and it could only be accessed by a rope hanging from an opening on the second floor. It was difficult for visitors to climb up until a main entrance was designated for them from the southern side during the restoration process.

The brilliance of Omani engineering can be seen in the divisions of Qalat Al-Fiqain, with its four floors divided into northern and southern parts. The northern part was dedicated to the military defense of the castle and the surrounding old houses, while the southern part was designated for residence and living. Upon entering the castle from the main gate on the southern side, one can directly see the well located on the ground floor, reaching a depth of about seven meters. It was connected to the upper floors of the residential part through openings that allowed a rope to hang from the upper floor to the well for easy extraction of water for various uses such as drinking, ablution, bathing, and others. The southern part also includes several storage rooms for storing dates, grains, and other food items, in addition to rooms and slopes that were used at that time for defending the castle during times of war by pouring boiled oil or honey on the attackers. The fourth floor contains a library filled with shelves used for placing religious and scientific books, manuscripts, documents, and other preserved items.

The historical researcher pointed out that the northern defensive section of the fortress can be accessed through a winding staircase that leads to the other floors of the fortress. On the third floor of the right side, there is a prison called "Al-Matmara". In addition to the scattered chutes, openings, and nozzles on the upper floors overlooking the surroundings of the fortress, which are used to launch cannons for the defense of the fortress and the town. The fortress also features two towers that are used for observation during times of peace and war. To facilitate visitors to the fortress, a door has been added on the upper floor of the fortress that connects between the northern and southern parts, leading to the lower floors.

In 1991, the Ministry of Heritage and Culture completely restored the fortress as it is part of Omani history. The damaged and affected parts due to weather factors over time were rehabilitated, and it was opened to visitors in 1994. In 2008, the fortress was renovated again by restoring the towers, corridors, and arches, and placing surface stones on the ground floor of the fortress. A new door was also opened connecting the northern and southern parts on the second-to-last floor, facilitating visitors during their visit. Additionally, a side belt was placed around the fortress from all directions, adding an aesthetic character to the fortress. All the floors were also externally maintained using plaster.

The fortress encourages visitors and tourists from within and outside the Sultanate to explore this historical treasure and its intricate details and secrets in traditional military architecture.

== Sultan Qaboos College ==
Manah is the place where Sultan Qaboos College for Teaching Arabic Language to Non-Native Speakers is located. The college strives to become a regional and international leader in ASL teaching, through its programs that depends on the latest technologies in teaching foreign languages and contribution in building communication and cultural bridges with other non-Arabic speaking nations.

The mission of Sultan Qaboos College for Teaching Arabic Language to Non-Native Speakers is to contribute to the production of graduates with high linguistic and cultural competency in Modern Standard Arabic. The college strives to enable the students to communicate and interact effectively in any Arab society and to allow them to continue further studies in educational institutions where Arabic is the medium of instruction.

== See also ==
- List of cities in Oman
