= Nakhal =

Nakhal نَخل (in Arabic)
- Town
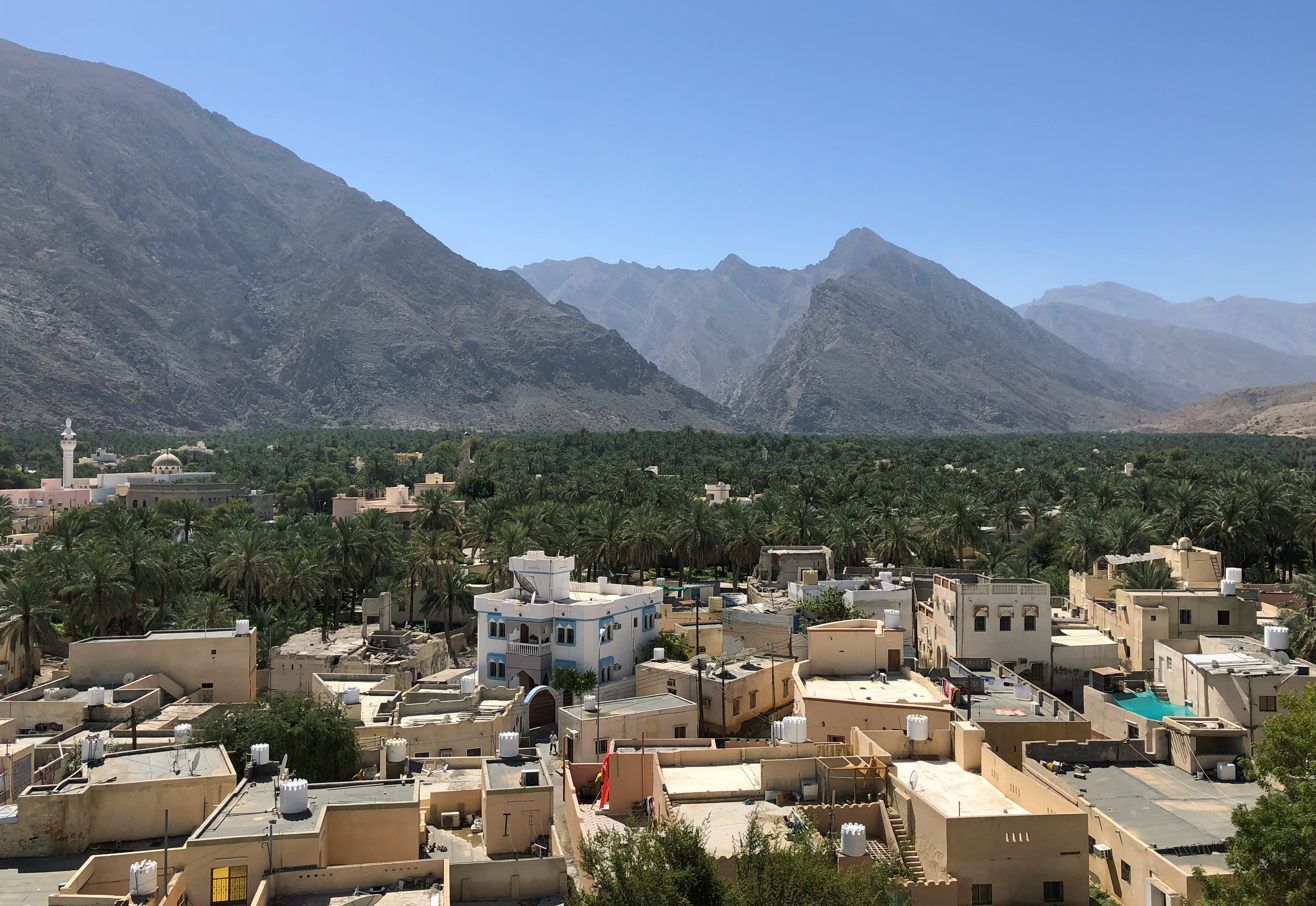
- View of the town from Nakhal Fort, with Al Hajar Mountains in the background

- Location in Oman
- Coordinates: 23°23′N 57°49′E
- Country: Oman
- Region: Al Batinah Region
- Governorate: Al-Batinah South

Population (2020)
  - Total: 28,088
- Time zone: UTC+4 (+4)

Nakhal (Arabic: نَخَل) or Nakhl (Arabic: نَخْل) is a wilayah in Al Batinah South Governorate in Oman. Several castles and forts are located here, including the pre-7th century Nakhal Fort.

== Notable people ==
- Abdullah Al Hilali, international football referee.
