= Al-Qabil =

Al-Qabil القابل
- Province
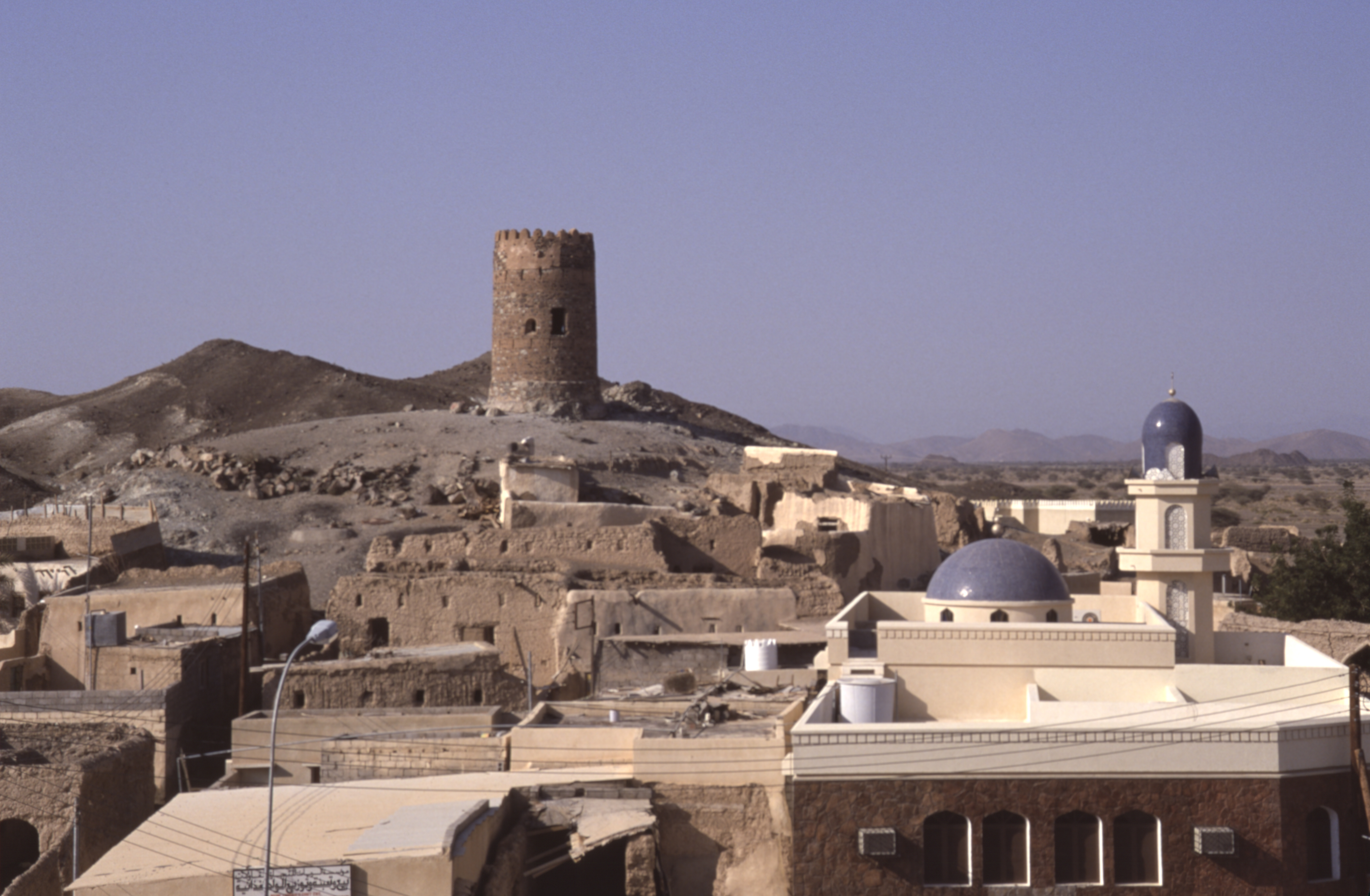
- Al-Mudhayrib, the second largest town in the province of al-Qabil, in 2001

- Location of al-Qabil within Oman
- Coordinates: 22°34′N 58°41′E
- Country: Oman
- Governorate: Ash-Sharqiya North
- Seat: Al-Qabil

Government
  - Wali: Mahmoud bin Rashid bin Hilal al Saadi

Area
  - Total: 1,632 km^{2} (630 sq mi)

Population (December 2020)
  - Total: 24,824
  - Density: 15.21/km^{2} (39.40/sq mi)
- Time zone: UTC+4 (GST)

Al-Qabil (Arabic: القابل, romanized: Al-Qābl) is a province in the governorate of ash-Sharqiya North in Oman. It covers an area of 1,632 kilometres (1,014 mi) and recorded a population of 24,824 in the 2020 Omani census. Its capital is the town of al-Qabil.

== Geography ==
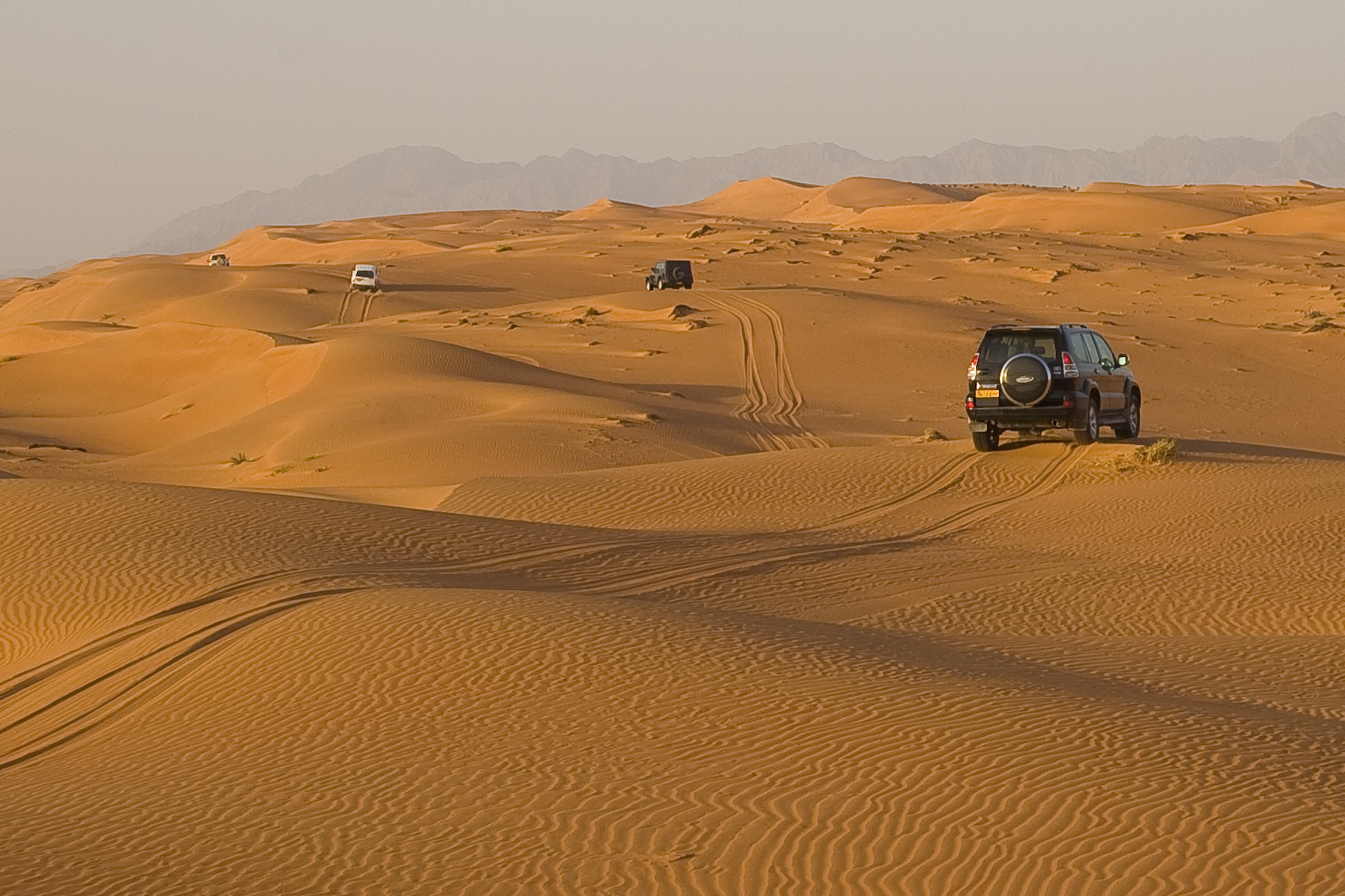
The Sharqiya Sands at al-Areesh camp south of the town of al-Qabil.

Al-Qabil is located at the northwest corner of the Sharqiya Sands desert in eastern Oman. It borders all the other provinces in ash-Sharqiya North: Ibra to the northwest, Dema Wa Thaieen to the north, Wadi Bani Khalid to the northeast, Bidiya to the southeast, and al-Mudhaibi to the southwest.

The wadis of al-Qabil and Izz run in parallel northwest to southeast through the centre of the province before converging at al-Wasil to form the Wadi Batha, which continues past Bidiya to the Arabian Sea. Beneath them lies the Sharqiya Sands aquifer, which has an estimated volume of 12 cubic kilometres (2.9 cu mi) and annual recharge of 65 million cubic metres (2.3×10^{9} cu ft). The wadis divide the Sharqiya Sands in the south from the foothils of the eastern Hajar Mountains to the north. The Sharqiya Sands in the province form large dunes oriented in a north–south direction, their crests reaching 100 metres (330 ft) high and spaced about two kilometres (1.2 mi) apart.

== History ==
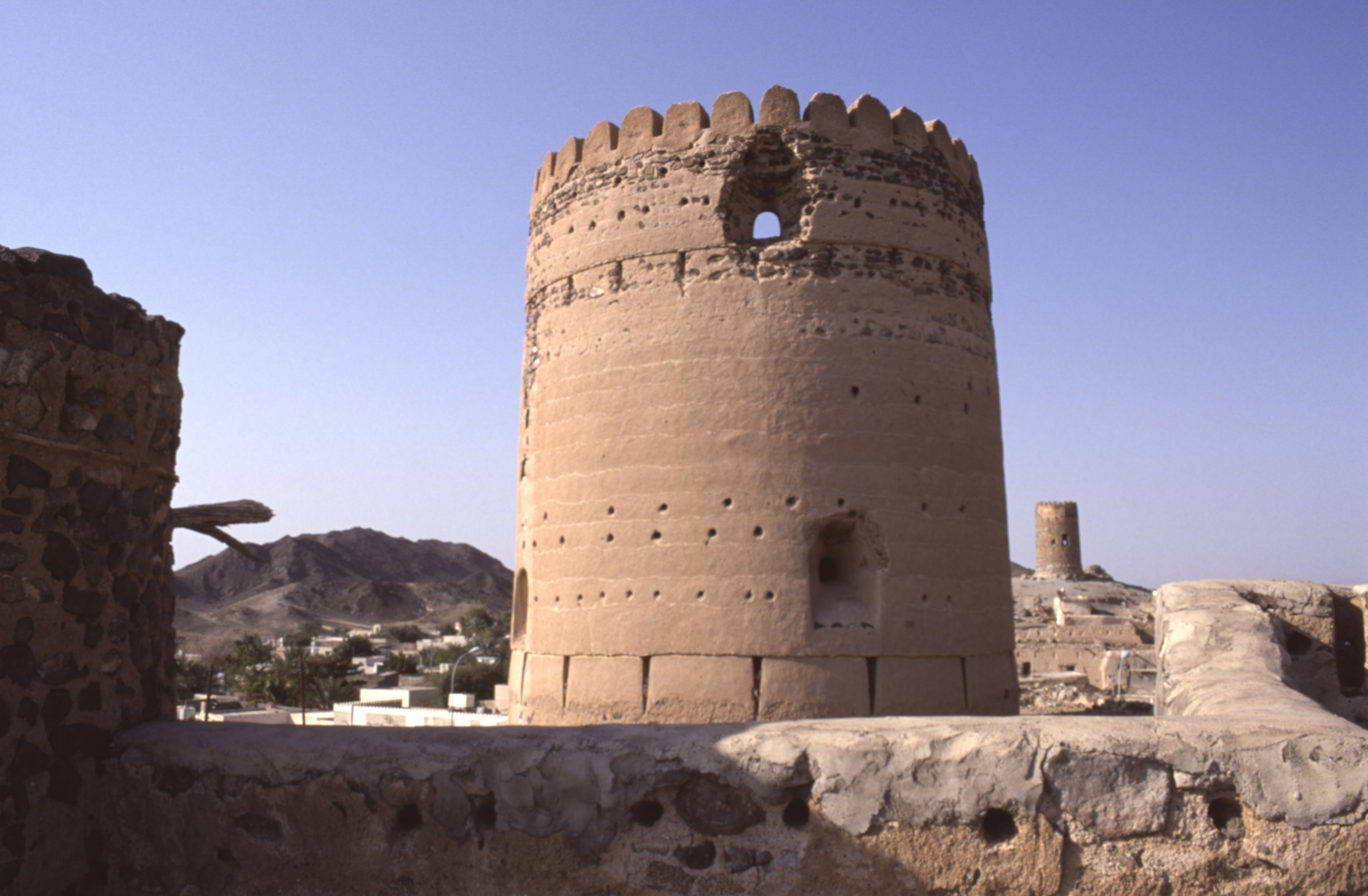
A watchtower in al-Mudhayrib, as seen in 2001.

The oasis of Shenah or Shanah, located 13 kilometres (8.1 mi) northeast of the village of Battin and 30 kilometres (19 mi) northeast of Ibra in the eastern Hajar Mountains, boasts the largest concentration of beehive tombs in Oman, which date to the third millennium ВСE.

The town of al-Qabil was founded in the 18th century by Sheikh Salih al-Harthi. The Harthi (also spelled Harthy, Harth, Hirth, etc.) are an important Omani tribe noted for its trading activities in Zanzibar. Originally from Ibra, the Harthi had established a presence at al-Mudhayrib in the early 18th century, building the first falaj there, before founding al-Qabil. They also founded the oasis of al-Ghallaji, 3 kilometres (1.9 mi) north of al-Mudhayrib, around 1906. James Raymond Wellsted visited al-Qabil (which he transcribed as Cawbil) in 1835.

Notable examples of historical architecture in the province include:

- The town of al-Mudhayrib, with its dawudi-type falaj and grand architecture built by merchants who prospered in the mid-to-late 18th century, including houses, sablah (public meeting spaces, also known as majlis), mosques, and fortifications with seven watchtowers still standing today.
- The towered fort at al-Qabil.
- Al-Saqri Mosque in the town of Izz, which is estimated to be more than 500 years old, and is supplied with water from a falaj. It was restored from 2015 to 2016.

== Demographics ==
Historical population
Year	Pop.	±% p.a.
1993	11,957	—
2003	13,569	+1.27%
2010	16,033	+2.41%
2020	24,824	+4.47%
Source: National Centre for Statistics and Information, Oman (1993) via City Population (2003–2020)

The population of al-Qabil grew from 11,957 in the first Omani census in 1993, to 24,824 in the 2020 census. According to the 2020 census, al-Qabil's population had a sex ratio of 144 males per 100 females, and 76% of the population were Omani citizens while 24% were foreign citizens.

As of the 2020 census, the most populous settlements in the province are al-Mudhayrib (population 4,454), al-Qabil (2,959), ad-Diriz (2,144), an-Naba (1,875), Izz (1,796), and al-Ghallaji (1,171).

== Economy ==
The main economic activity in al-Qabil is agriculture, with dates being the most important crop. The making of silver objects such as daggers and jewelry is the most important traditional industry in the area. Al-Minjirid is known for its confectionery, pottery, and plaster industries. Tourism is growing in the area, with the Sharqiya or Wahiba Sands already being an established attraction.

== Infrastructure ==
The ash-Sharqiya expressway runs through the towns of al-Mudhayrib, al-Qabil and ad-Diriz, connecting the province with Bidbid to the northwest and al Kamil Wal Wafi to the southeast. It was opened in January 2020.

There are two dams in the province of al-Qabil: Wadi Nam Dam with a capacity of 0.82 million cubic metres (29×10^{6} cu ft), and al-Aqeedah Dam with a capacity of 0.04 million cubic metres (1.4×10^{6} cu ft).

About fifty aflaj irrigation systems are located in the province, the most important ones being located at al-Mudhayrib, al-Qabil, ad-Diriz and an-Naba.
