= Wadi Bani Khalid (Wilayat) =

Wādī Banī Khālid وَادِي بَنِي خَالِد
- وِلَايَة وَادِي بَنِي خَالِد; Wilāyat Wādī Banī Khālid
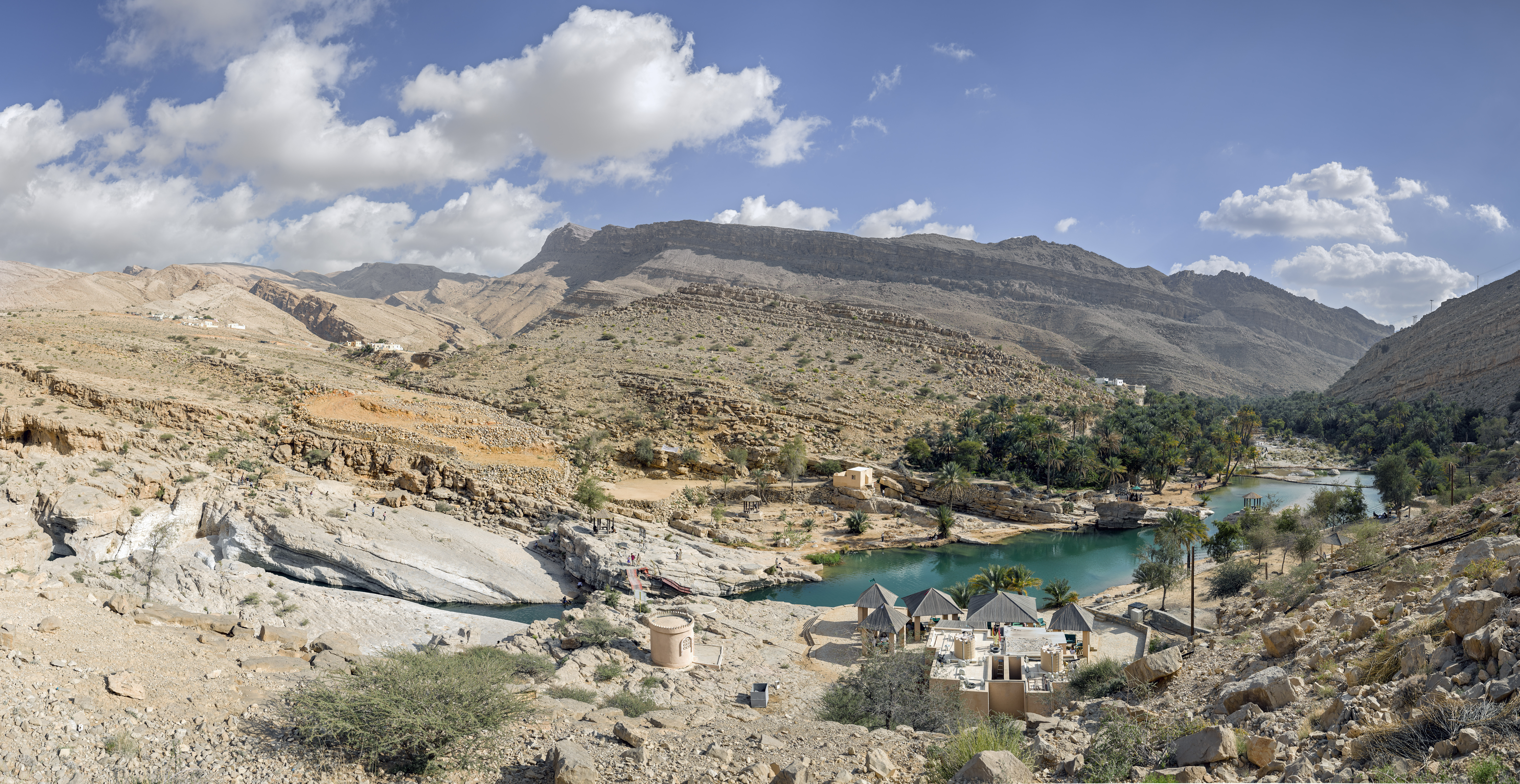
- Heading east, the wadi from above, within the Eastern Hajar Mountains

- Location of Wadi Bani Khalid in Oman
- Country: Oman
- Region: Ash-Sharqiyyah, North
- Province: Wadi Bani Khalid
- Time zone: UTC+4 (GST)

Wilāyat Wādī Banī Khālid (Arabic: وِلَايَة وَادِي بَنِي خَالِد) is a Wilāyah (Province) in the Northern Governorate of the Eastern Region of Oman. Located about 126 miles (203 km) from Muscat, and 120 km (75 miles) from Sur, the province has a wadi which serves as a destination for tourists, that is Wādī Banī Khālid (Arabic: وَادِي بَنِي خَالِد).

== Villages or towns ==
The village of Badaʿ (بضعه) is a well-known stop for tourists in the valley. Bidiyyah is approximately 40 km (25 miles) by road.
