= Schizonycha buettikeri =

Scientific classification
- Kingdom: Animalia
- Phylum: Arthropoda
- Clade: Pancrustacea
- Class: Insecta
- Order: Coleoptera
- Suborder: Polyphaga
- Infraorder: Scarabaeiformia
- Family: Scarabaeidae
- Genus: Schizonycha
- Species: S. buettikeri

Binomial name
- Schizonycha buettikeri Sabatinelli & Pontuale, 1998

Species of beetle

Schizonycha buettikeri is a species of beetle of the family Scarabaeidae. It is endemic to the Arabian Peninsula, where it is found in Oman, Saudi Arabia and the United Arab Emirates.

== Taxonomy ==
The species was described in 1998 by Guido Sabatinelli and Giorgio Pontuale in a review of the Melolonthinae and Pachydeminae of Arabia. The holotype, a male, was collected by Wilhelm Büttiker at Wadi Batayn, Saudi Arabia, at 620 m (2,030 ft) on 22 April 1981, and is held in the Natural History Museum of Basel. The World Scarabaeidae Database places it in the nominate subgenus of Schizonycha, in the tribe Schizonychini.

== Description ==
Adults reach a length of about 8–13 mm (0.31–0.51 in). They have a cylindrical, elongate, dark red body. They are shiny above and beneath and thinly covered with tiny setae. The holotype is 11 mm long and 4.5 mm wide. Male paratypes measure 8–10 mm, and some females from Wadi Bani Khalid in Oman reach 13 mm. The antenna has ten segments with a three-segmented club, and the front tibiae are strongly tridentate.

It is distinguished from Schizonycha scorteccii by its sharp hind pronotal angles, the very small inner branch of the tarsal claws and the shape of the parameres. The authors considered it closely related to a series of specimens from southern Iran near Bandar Abbas, which they thought probably represents a new species.

== Distribution and habitat ==
The original description lists several localities in central Saudi Arabia, including Wadi Hanifa, and in northern Oman, including Wadi Bani Khalid and the Sohar area. Collection sites lie between 95 and 900 m above sea level. Specimens were collected from February to October, but 75% of the records date from April and May.

In the United Arab Emirates it was first reported from Jebel Hafit. It was later taken in light traps at Al-Ajban, near Mahafiz, near the tunnel on the Sharjah–Khor Kalba road, and in Wadi Shawkah.

== Etymology ==
The species is dedicated to Wilhelm Büttiker, "an eminent scientific authority on Arabian zoology", in thanks for providing the material.
