= Snake Gorge =

Wadi in Ad Dakhiliyah Governate, Oman

Coordinates: 23°12′36″N 57°23′11.4″E

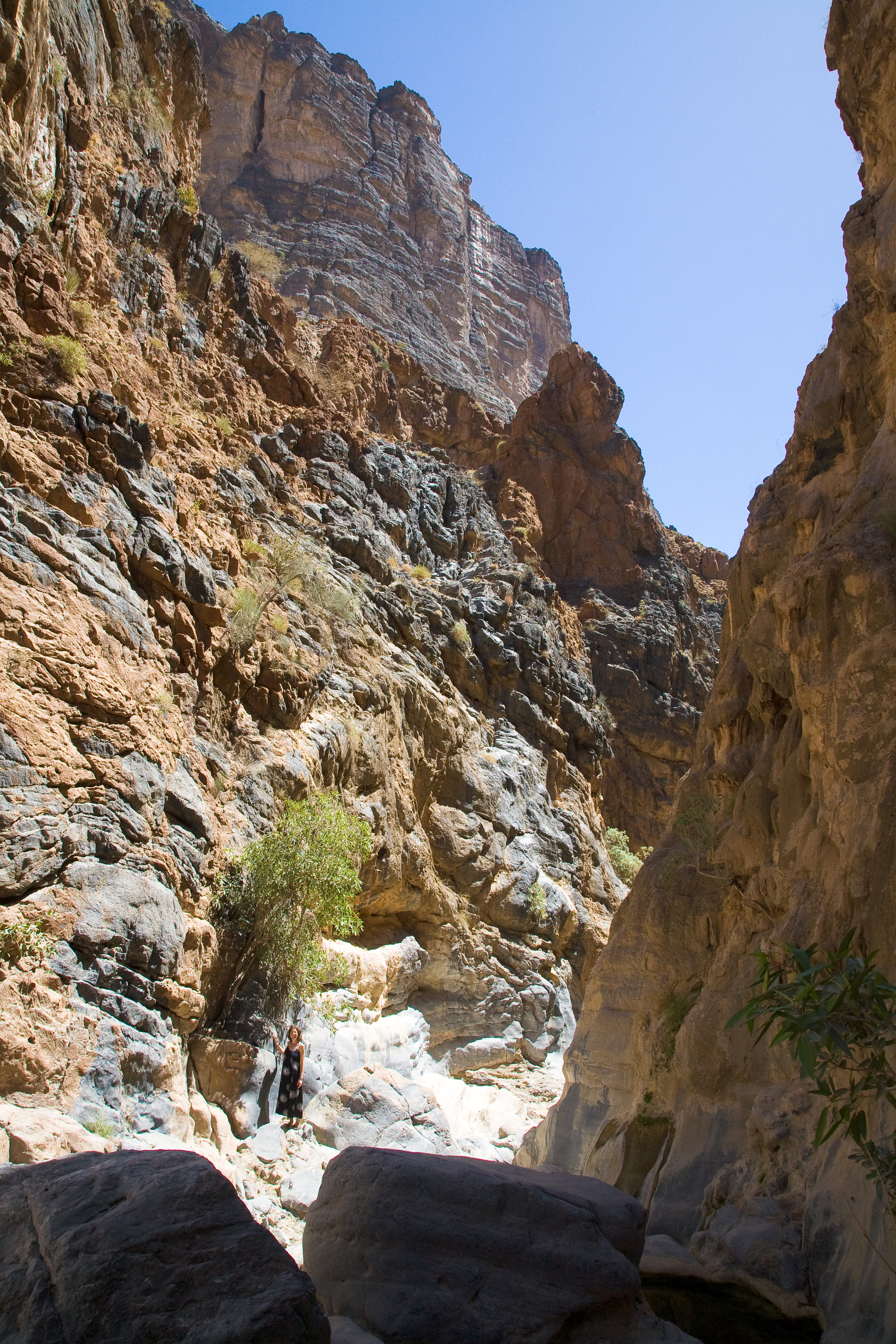
Snake Gorge, within Wadi Bani Awf

Snake Gorge, also called Wādī Bīmah (Arabic: وَادِي بِيْمَة), is a gorge or wadi in Ad Dakhiliyah region of Oman. It is popular with hikers. It is a fantastic route for jumping off small cliffs into water pools. There are also natural water slides. However, it is flash-flood prone, and in the 1996, a small group of hikers drowned. In 2014, 11 tourists from Dubai in the UAE were trapped during rains, but managed to survive on the rocks for 2 hours, despite losing their vehicle in the process. The Royal Oman Police and PACDA frequently try to prevent such tragedies by sending out weather warnings.

== See also ==
- List of wadis of Oman
