= Sa'ida Bint Khatir al-Farisi =

Sa'ida Bint Khatir al-Farisi (born 1956) is an Omani poet.

Born in Sur, at the time part of Ash Sharqiyah Region, al-Farisi is a graduate from Kuwait University, from which she received her BA in Arabic and Islamic law in 1976. She also took a degree in education, and has since begun work on a master's degree in the field of Arabic literary criticism. Apart from her literary work she has served as assistant dean of students at Sultan Qaboos University. She has served on the board of the Cultural Club, and worked as editor-in-chief of al-'Umaniya magazine. Her earliest poetry collections date from the 1980s.

== Awards and honours ==
Al-Farisi has received a number of local awards, as well as the Medal of Kings and Princes from the Gulf Cooperation Council in Literature.
