= Badiyyah =

Badiyyah may refer to:

- Badiyyah, Syria
- Badiyyah, Oman
