= Ash Sharqiyah Region (Oman) =

Ash-Sharqiyyah Region ٱلْمِنْطَقَة ٱلشَّرْقِيَّة Al-Minṭaqah Ash-Sharqiyyah
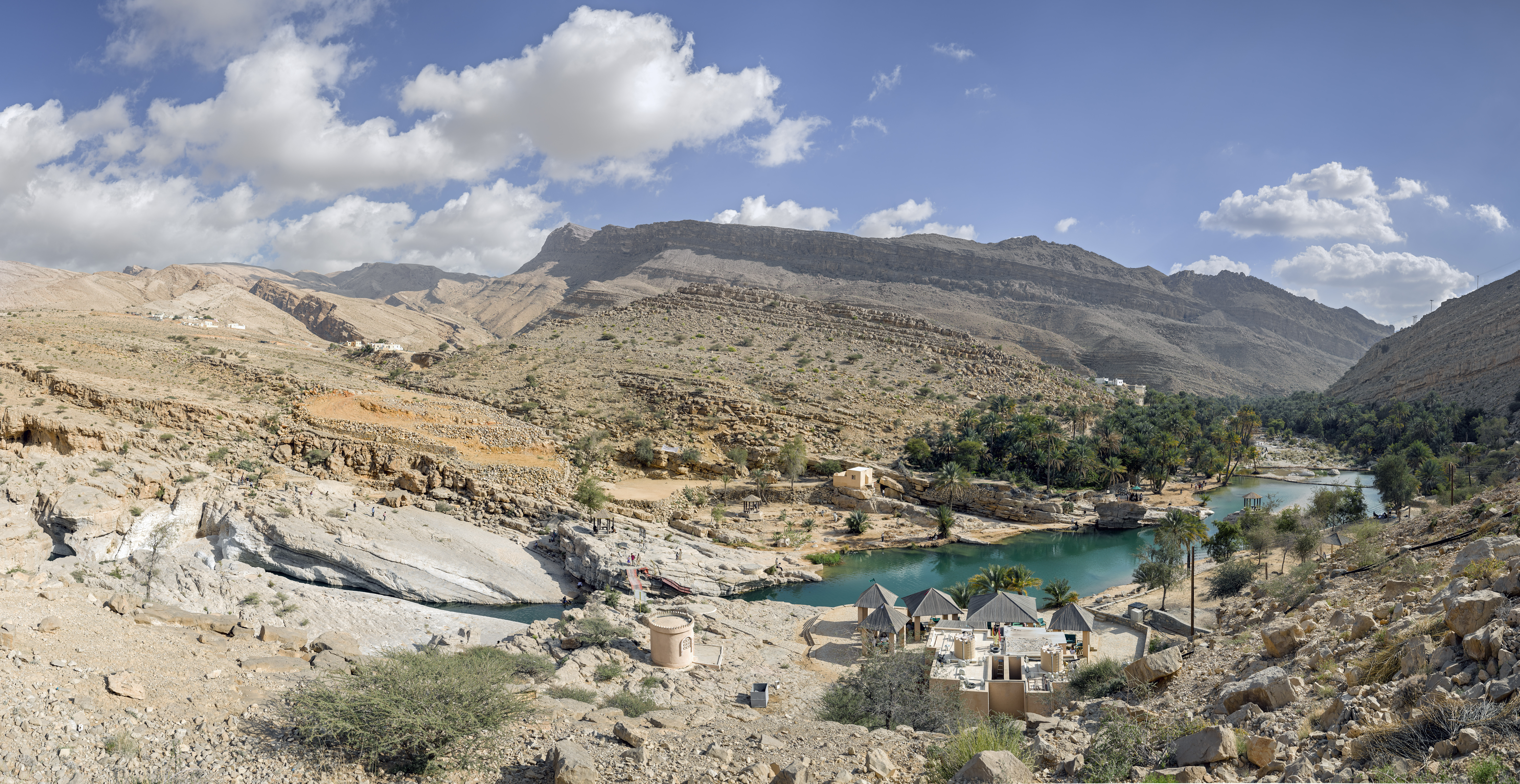
- Wadi Bani Khalid, a destination for tourists in the area

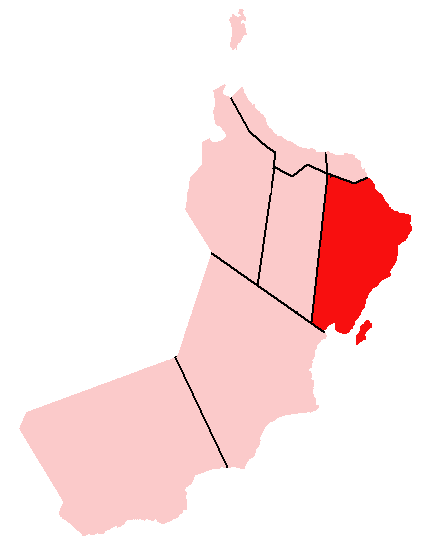
- Location of the former eastern region of Oman
- Country: Oman
- Region: Ash-Sharqiyyah
- Time zone: UTC+4 (GST)

Ash-Sharqiyyah Region (Arabic: ٱلْمِنْطَقَة ٱلشَّرْقِيَّة, romanized: Al-Minṭaqah Ash-Sharqiyyah, lit. 'The Eastern Region') was the eastern minṭaqah (region) of the Sultanate of Oman. The capital of Ash-Sharqiyyah was Sur. On 28 October 2011 Ash Sharqiyah Region was split into Ash Sharqiyah North Governorate and Ash Sharqiyah South Governorate.

Ash Sharqiyah Region consisted of eleven provinces (Wilāyāt): Sur, Ibra, Al-Mudhaibi, Al-Kamil Wal-Wafi, Jalan Bani Bu Hassan, Jalan Bani Bu Ali, Wadi Bani Khalid, Dema Wa Thaieen, Bidiya, Al-Qabil, and Massirah. The main cities are Sur and Ibra.

== History ==
=== Archaeology ===
In November 2019, 45 well-preserved tombs covering a 50-80 square metre area and a settlement, dating back to beginning of the Iron Age, were discovered in Al-Mudhaibi by archaeologists from Oman and Heidelberg University. Archaeologists believed that the site belonged to the miners who were working in copper mining.

== Ecology ==
Of particular touristic interest is the coast, which includes the headlands of Raʾs al-Ḥadd and Raʾs al-Ghaimah (Arabic: رَأْس ٱلْغَيْمَة). The stretch of beach (42 kilometres (26 miles)) between these two places is the most significant nesting ground in the Indian Ocean for green turtles. An estimated 13,000 turtles lay their individual clutches of 80 to 100 eggs annually. Oman's Ministry of Regional Municipalities, Environment and Water administers the site, which is one of the Sultanate's most important nature reserves.

In addition, there is Wadi Bani Khalid. Located in the Hajar Mountains, and what is now the northern governorate, it is one of the most well-known wadis in the country.

== See also ==
- Eastern Arabia
- Ras al-Jinz
- Sharqiya Sands
