= Wadi Bani Awf =

Wadi in Oman

Coordinates: 23°12′36″N 57°23′11.4″E

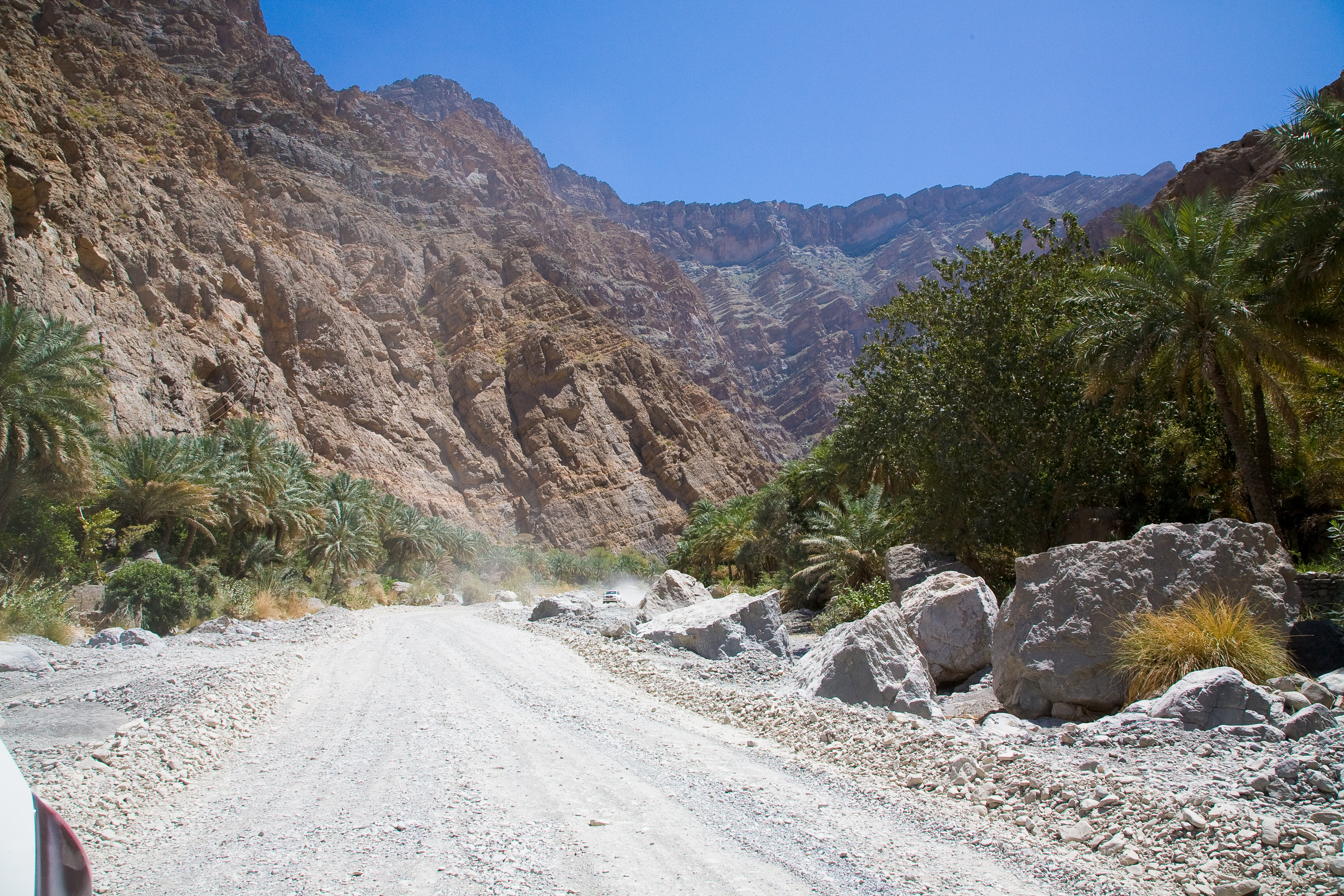
Wadi Bani Auf

Wadi Bani Auf (Arabic: وَادِي بَنِي عَوْف, romanized: Wādī Banī ʿAwf) is a wādī (وَادِي, gorge) in Ad Dakhiliyah Region of Oman. People with the name Al-ʿAufī (ٱلْعَوْفِي) are associated with this place.

== See also ==
- Al Hajar Mountains
- Al-Rustaq
- List of wadis of Oman
  - Snake Gorge (within Wadi Bani Awf)
  - Wadi Bani Khalid
