= Bidiya =

Bidiyyah بِـدِيَّـة
- Location of Bidiyyah in Oman
- Country: Oman
- Region: Ash-Sharqiyyah
- Province: Bidiyyah
- Time zone: UTC+4 (GST)

Bidiya or Bidiyyah (Arabic: بِـدِيَّـة) is a Wilayah situated in the middle of the Eastern Region of the Sultanate of Oman. It is located about 233 kilometres (145 miles) from the capital city, Muscat. The province of Bidiyyah, also known as Badiyah, is one of the provinces in the Eastern Region of Oman. It shares its northern border with Al-Qabil province, while its eastern boundaries are adjacent to Al-Kamil wa Al-Wafi, and Wadi Bani Khalid provinces. The history of Bidiyyah dates back to the 8th Hijri century when it was inhabited by the Hadhrami people. The town and its surrounding areas have witnessed significant historical events, including defending against invaders like the Al-Mutairi Al-Wahhabi, who was killed in 1813 CE. His known grave is located in the town of Al-Wasil. Moreover, Bidiyyah comprises fifteen villages, including Al Muntarib, Al Gabbi, Shahik, Al Rakah, Al Hawiyah, Al Shariq, Al Wasil, and Al Dhahir.

== Afjal and Springs ==
=== Al-Dhahir Falaj ===
The village of Al-Dhahir derives its name from the renowned Al-Dhahir Falaj, which reaches a depth of 60 arm lengths (approximately 108 meters). This falaj is among the most famous in the Eastern Region. The distinguishing feature of Al-Dhahir village lies in its abundant resources, including a vast falaj and a flowing river of fresh and plentiful water. The construction of this falaj was led by Sheikh Jum'a bin Said Al-Mughairy and the residents of Al-Dhahir. Exploiting the presence of this ample water source, the people of Al-Dhahir historically and contemporarily cultivated a variety of crops. In the past, they cultivated crops such as wheat, barley, corn, lentils, millet, pearl millet, grapes, quince, garlic, and fava beans. In recent times, they have expanded their agricultural endeavors to include watermelon, cucumber, cantaloupe, tomatoes, and other crops that thrive with the water supply from Al-Dhahir Falaj.

The tourist attractions of the province are diverse, ranging from lush oases to natural springs and a variety of ecosystems. Among the most notable oases are:

- Al-Muntarib
- Al-Shariq
- Hatwah
- Al-Qa'a Al-Jahs
- Dubeik
- Al-Rakah
- Shahik
- Al-Hayli
- Al-Hawiyah
- Al-Dhahir
- Al-Matawaa
- Al-Ghabi

Regarding the scattered springs in the "Al-Dhahir" area:

- Ayn Yaya
- Abu Sahila
- Abu Sareemah
- Abu Ghafa
- Ayn Al-Tamar

== Traditional Crafts ==
Some of the most important traditional industries in Bidiyah include:

- Gold and silver craftsmanship, producing jewelry, daggers, and swords.
- Palm frond crafts, including "Makhazaf" tools used for harvesting dates from palm trees, as well as "Tharouf" containers employed for preserving dates.
- Leather tanning, utilized in crafting belts for daggers and scabbards for swords.
- Palm leaf crafts, with significant items such as ropes and baskets ("Da'un").

== Sharqiyah Sands ==
Nature plays a significant role in the aesthetic appeal of Bidiyah Province, where the environment varies between sand dunes, mountains, plains, and lush oases. The region is renowned for organizing camel and Arabian horse races, events that draw enthusiasts from within and outside the Sultanate.

The Eastern Sands of Oman form one of the many sand deserts, an array of dunes spanning from red to brown, creating a mesmerizing landscape. Covering around 10,000 square kilometers, these sands host about 200 types of plant life. The Eastern Sands are a preferred camping destination due to their accessibility and nearby amenities. The presence of tourist camps dotting the golden sands adds to the experience, providing services in the heart of the golden sand sea.

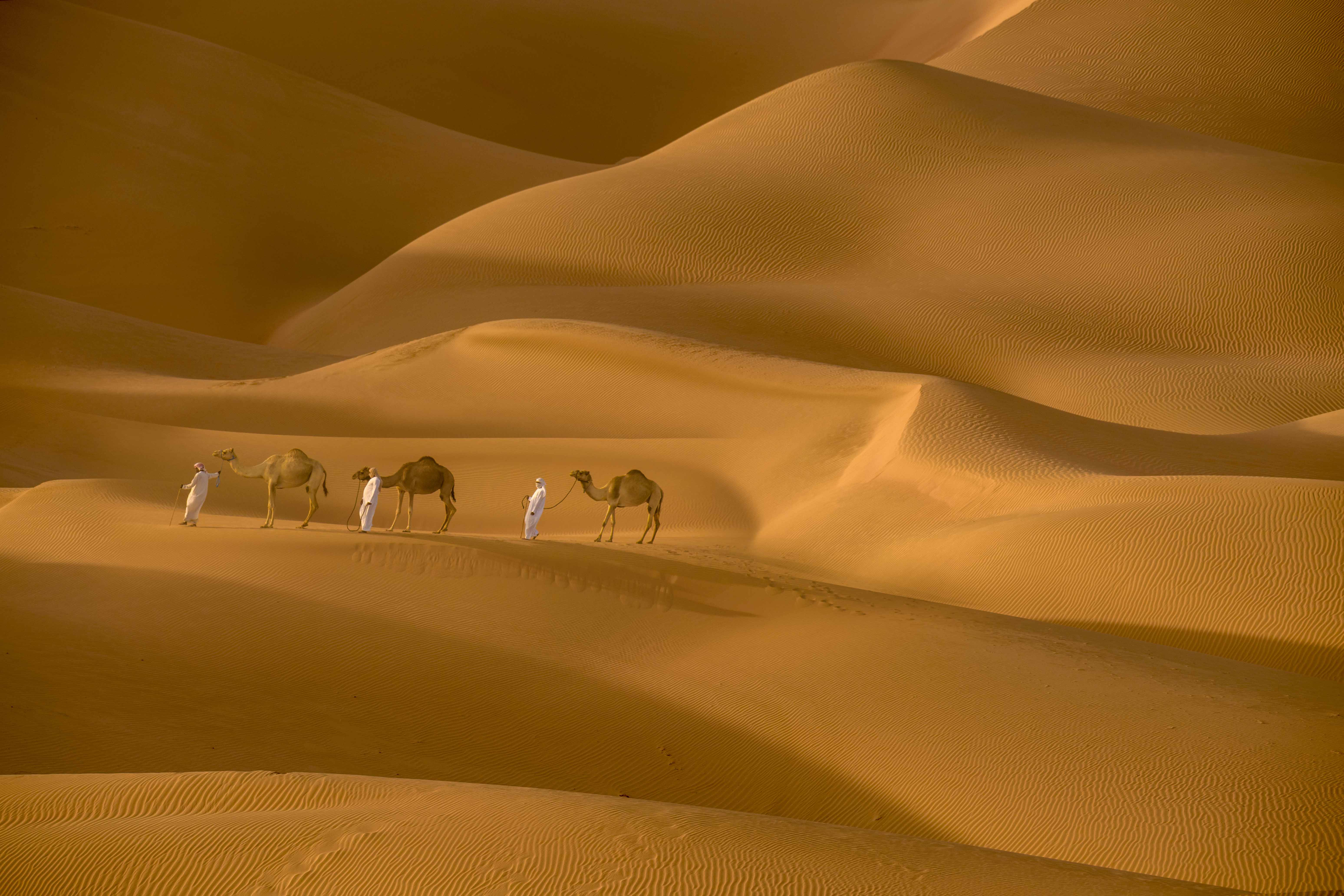
Sharqiya sands in Bidiyah (Formerly known as Wahaiba Sands)

Bidiyah Province stands as a gateway to the oases at the entrance of the Eastern Sands, serving as a starting point for people inside the Eastern Sands. Away from urban noise and as a break from daily routines, these sands hold various oases. Notable among them is the Raka Oasis, nestled amidst sand hills on three sides, offering a picturesque view. The Shihak Oasis presents similar features, along with the expansive Hawiyah Oasis, surrounded by sand dunes, creating a unique scene. This oasis creates a green peninsula in a unique tableau that distinguishes it from other oases in the Sultanate. Moreover, the steep slopes in the southern part of the Hawiyah Oasis provide a location for sand skiing.

Among these oases, the Eidan Oasis is noteworthy, named after the abundant trees that cast their luxuriant shade. The presence of a water well further enhances its allure. Accessing it usually requires local guidance.

Numerous tourist activities and events take place in these sands, including off-road vehicle dune challenges, horse and camel races, contributing to the dynamic atmosphere of the region.

== Al-Muntarib Fortress ==
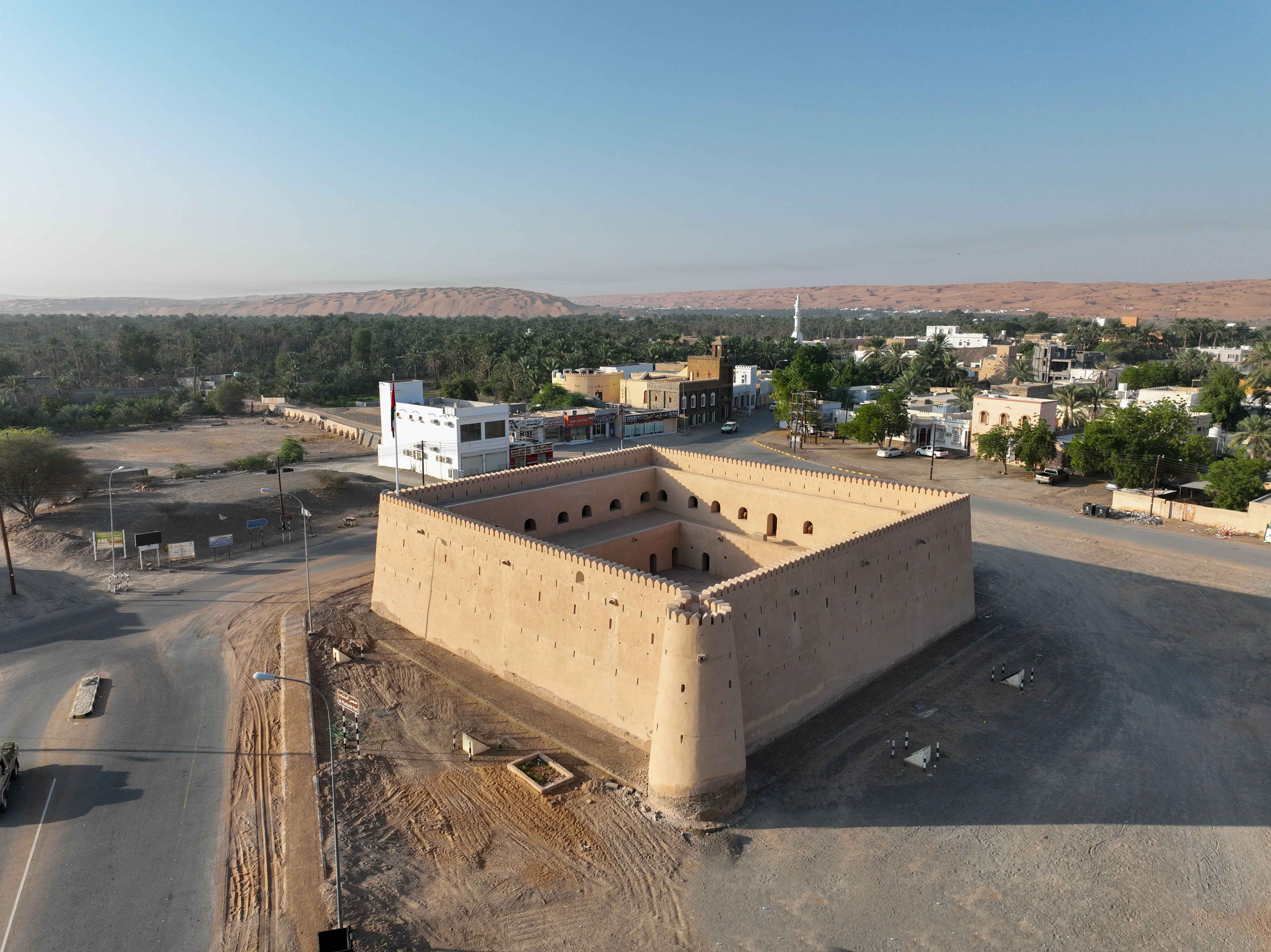
Al-Muntarib Fortress in Bidiyah

This fortress was constructed in the 13th century AD at the heart of Al-Muntarib village in Bidiyah. Its purpose was to provide protection for the inhabitants against enemy attacks.

Al-Muntarib Fortress holds significant tourist interest. Originally built in the early 7th Hijri century, it was later restored during the reign of Imam Azan bin Qais Al-Busaidi. The government also undertook restoration efforts, reopening it as a heritage site in 1991. Consequently, this fortress became a prominent tourist attraction within the Sultanate. It once served as the main residence for judges and governors before and after Oman's renaissance. Comprising a ground floor and two upper floors, the ground floor features a central gate closed by two large doors. The construction of rooms and corridors on both floors employed the "Kafi" method, resembling honeycomb cells. This distinctive architectural approach was used to build the fortress, avoiding the use of palm trunks or timber for roofing. Instead, natural raw materials were employed. The ground floor includes consultation rooms, multi-purpose chambers, a mosque, and a central well. The fortress also accommodates rooms for the governor's family, storerooms, and spaces for the military commander, ammunition storage, and other functions. On the other hand, the upper floor contains a long corridor historically used as a school for teaching the Quran, religious sciences, and Arabic language. There are designated areas for the residents, and ventilation openings overlook Al-Muntarib village, serving as a vital source of fresh air from the sea breeze during the evenings. Multiple balconies also offer panoramic views of the village. The second floor is open to an external space, affording visitors a beautiful view in all directions. The fortress is adorned with numerous authentic heritage artifacts and symbols, providing insights into Bidiyah's heritage for visitors. This fortress overlooks a fertile palm oasis on the outskirts of the Eastern Sands, which serves as a gathering point for many wandering Bedouins. During the harvest season, from June to September each year, they converge upon Al-Muntarib and other oasis towns. The fortress covers an area of 900 square meters.

== Sport Events ==
Bidiyah is host to two sports events: the Bidiyah Challenge, and horse and camel racing.

The Bidiyah Challenge is held every February. It was recently introduced to the Persian Gulf region' sporting calendar. The aim of the race is to scale sand dunes in the least possible time driving a 4x4 car, mostly Jeeps and one-door Nissan Patrols.

Horse Races and camel Races are held during Eid days and during national day celebrations. Also, there is yearly festival which consists of a series of races for horses and camels, which are held under Royal Court Affairs supervision. Bidiyah hosts one of these races every year.

== See also ==
- List of cities in Oman
