= Muhammad Harithi =

Omani poet and writer (1962–2018)

- Born: Muhammad Ahmad Abdullah Al-Harithi; 1962; Al-Mudhaibi, Sultanate of Muscat and Oman
- Died: 27 May 2018 (aged 55–56); Muscat, Oman
- Education: Qatar University
- Occupations: Poet; writer

Muhammad Ahmad Abdullah Al-Harithi (Arabic: محمد أحمد عبد الله الحارثي; 1962 – 27 May 2018) was an Omani poet and writer.

== Early life ==
Al-Harithi was born in Al-Mudhaibi in the Sultanate of Muscat and Oman in 1962 (1381 AH). He obtained a bachelor's degree in geology and marine sciences from Qatar University in 1986.

== Career ==
He first published his poetry in some Arab periodicals, such as Al-Karmel and Mawaqif. He has several collections of poetry and is considered a pioneer in travel literature in Oman.

Al-Harithi worked at the Center for Marine and Fisheries sciences from 1987 to 1990, traveling between Morocco and Oman. In addition to vertical poetry and prose poems, he wrote literary articles, published first in Arab periodicals such as Al Karmel and Mawaqif.

== Death ==
Al-Harithi died at dawn on 27 May 2018 (13 Ramadan 1439) in Muscat after a struggle with illness at the age of 56.

== List of awards ==
- 2003: Ibn Battuta Prize for Travel Literature in its first session.
- 2014: Outstanding Cultural Achievement Award in the Sultanate of Oman.

== List of poems ==
- "uyoon tiwal al nahar" (Eyes All Day), 1992
- "kol Layla wa dohaha" (each Overnight), 1994
- "abead min zanjabar" (Beyond Zanzibar), 1997
- "foussaifissae hawae" (Eve mosaic)
- "loeba la tumall" (amayzing game)
- "Awda li al kitaba bi qalem al rassas" (Back to writing with a pencil)

== List of books ==
- "tanqih al makhtuta", (Manuscript revision), novel 2013
- "warshat al madi", (• Past Workshop, Collection of Articles), 2013
- "hayati qasida wadadtu law 'aktubuha" (My life is a poem that I wanted to write)
- "qarib a lkalimat yarsu", (The boat of words is moored), selections from some of his poems
- "al athar al shieria li'abi muslim al bahlani", (The Poetic Effects of Abu Muslim Al-Bahlani),
- "muhit katfindu, rihla fi al Himalaya" (Kaftandu Ocean, Himalayan Tours)
