= Ash Sharqiyah North Governorate =

Governorate of Oman

Ash-Sharqīyah North Governorate مُحَافَظَة شَمَال ٱلشَّرْقِيَّة Muḥāfaẓat Šamāl aš-Šarqīyah
- Governorate
- Wadi Bani Khalid, heading north

- Location of the Governorate in Oman
- Country: Oman
- Seat: Ibra

Government
  - Type: Governorate
  - Governor: Ali Bin Ahmed bin Mashari Al Shamsi

Population (2020 census)
  - Total: 271,800
- Time zone: UTC+4 (GST)

Ash Sharqiyah North Governorate (Arabic: مُحَافَظَة شَمَال ٱلشَّرْقِيَّة, romanized: Muḥāfaẓat Šamāl aš-Šarqīyah, English: Northeastern Governorate) is a governorate of Oman. It was created on 28 October 2011, when Ash Sharqiyah Region was split into Ash Sharqiyah North Governorate and Ash Sharqiyah South Governorate. The centre of the governorate is the wilāyah (province) of Ibra.

== Provinces ==
Ash-Sharqiyah North Governorate consists of six wilāyāt:

- Al-Qabil (Arabic: ٱلْقَابِل), population (2017): 23,824
- Al-Mudhaibi (Arabic: المضيبي), population (2017): 117,691
- Bidiya (Arabic: بدية), population (2017): 40,812
- Dema Wa Thaieen (Arabic: دماء والطائيين), population (2017): 26,817
- Ibra (Arabic: إبراء), population (2017): 57,561
- Wadi Bani Khalid, population (2017): 12,518

== Demographics ==
Historical population
Census year	Pop.	±% p.a.
1993	118,680	—
2003	140,091	+1.67%
2010	162,482	+2.14%
2020	271,822	+5.28%
Source: Citypopulation

== See also ==
- Eastern Arabia
- Sharqiya Sands
