= Battin =

Battin is a surname. Notable people with the surname include:

- Charles Battin, Luxembourgish brewer, founder of the Brasserie Battin
- Skip Battin (1934–2003), American musician
- Joe Battin (1853–1937), American baseball player
- Jim Battin (born 1962), American politician
- James F. Battin (1925–1996), American politician
- Brad Battin (born 1975), Australian politician
- Richard Battin (1925–2014), American applied mathematician
- Wendy Battin (1953–2015), American poet
