= Dema Wa Thaieen =

Dema Wa Thaieen دماء والطائيين Dima Wattayeen
- Wilayat
- Interactive map of Dema Wa Thaieen
- Coordinates: 23.034°N 58.509°E
- Country: Oman
- Governorate: Ash Sharqiyah North

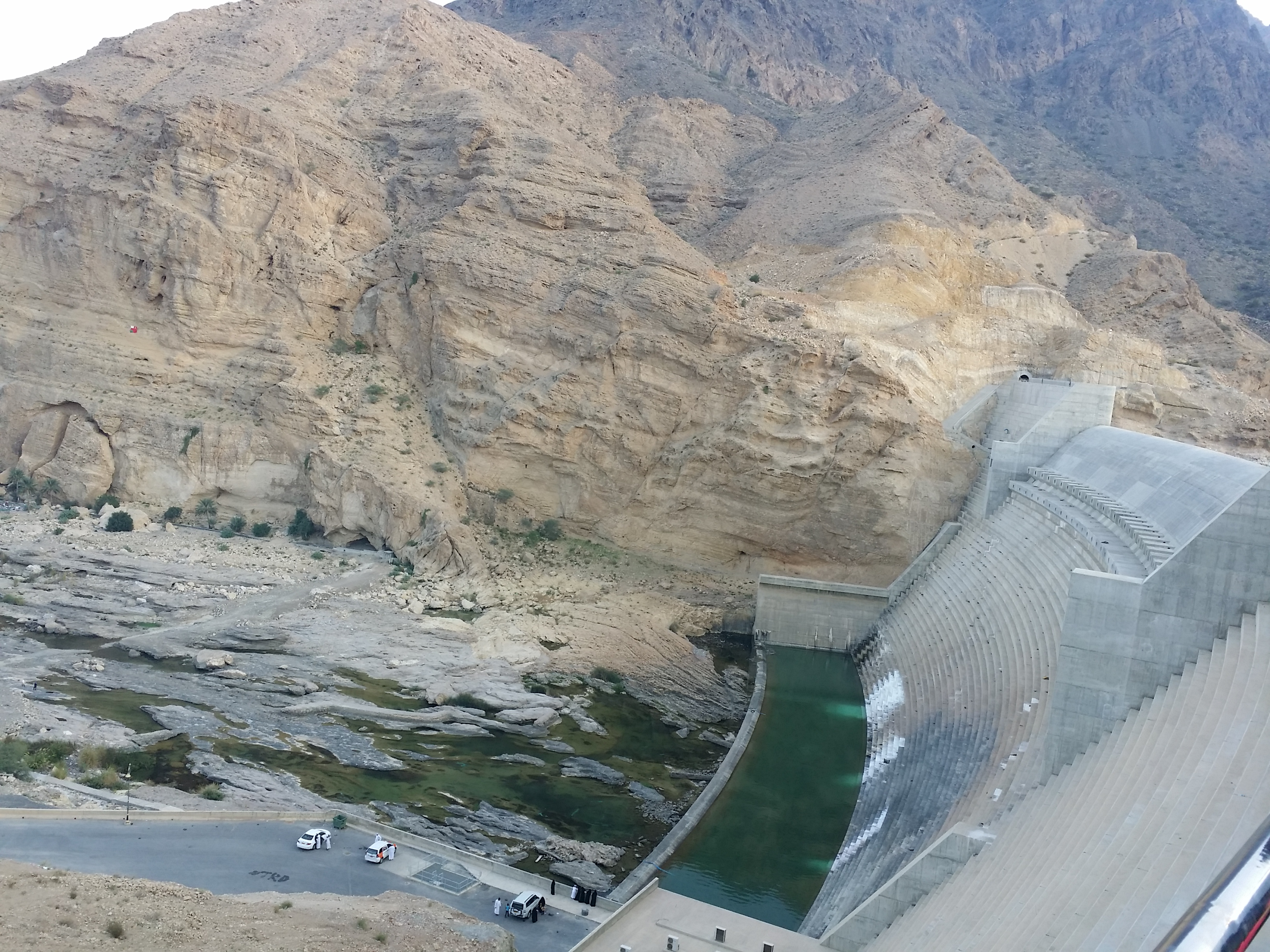
Dam in Dema Wa Thaeen, 2015

Dima Wattayeen (also Dema Wa Thaieen) is a Wilayat of Ash Sharqiyah North in the Sultanate of Oman.
