= Sharqiya Sands =

Region of desert in Oman

Sharqiya Sands in Oman

The Sharqiya Sands (Arabic: ٱلرِّمَال ٱلشَّرْقِيَّة, romanized: Ar-Rimāl Ash-Sharqiyyah, formerly known as Wahiba Sands (Arabic: رِمَال وَهِيْبَة, romanized: Rimāl Wahībah or Arabic: رَمْلَة آل وَهِيْبَة, romanized: Ramlat Āl Wahībah)) is a region of desert in Oman. The region was named for the Bani Wahiba tribe. Divided between the northern and southern governorates in the Eastern Region. The area is defined by a boundary of 180 kilometers (110 mi) north to south and 80 kilometers (50 mi) east to west, with an area of 12,500 square kilometers (4,800 sq mi). The desert has been of scientific interest since a 1986 expedition by the Royal Geographical Society documented the diversity of the terrain, the flora and fauna, noting 16,000 invertebrates as well as 200 species of other wildlife, including avifauna. They also documented 150 species of native flora.

== Geology ==
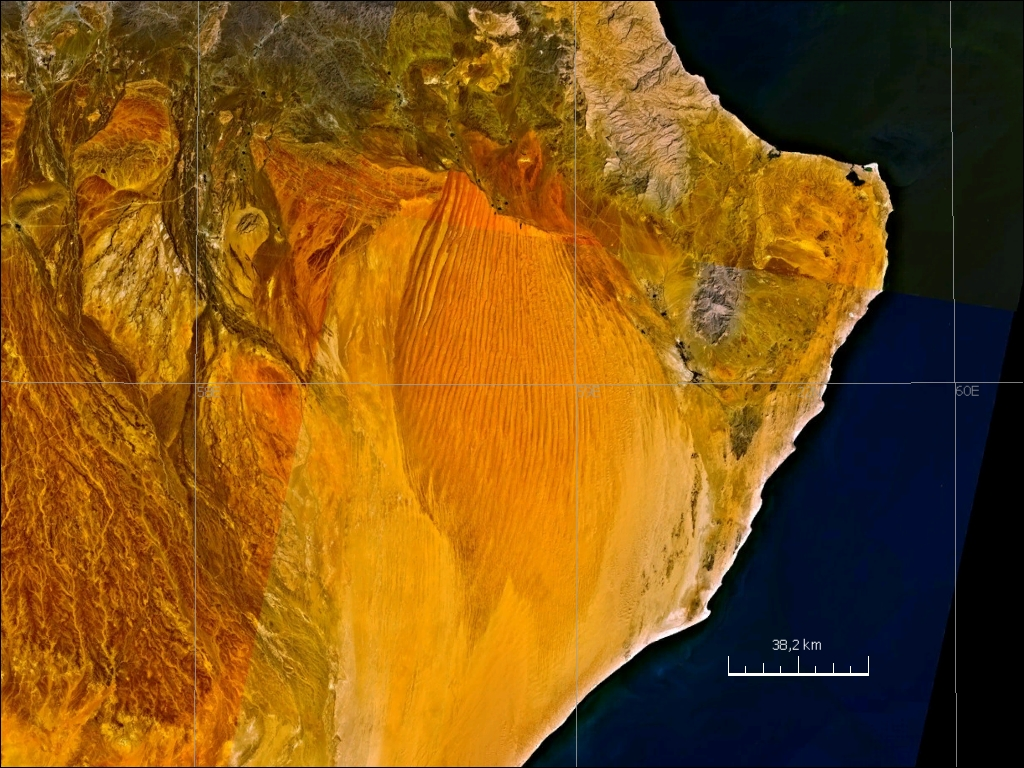
NASA satellite image

The desert was formed during the Quaternary period as a result of the forces of south-west blowing monsoon and the northern shamal trade wind, coming in from the east. Based on the types of dunes found in the area, it is divided into the high, or upper, Wahiba and low Wahiba. The upper area contains mega-ridge sand systems on a north–south line that are believed to have been formed by monsoon. The dunes of the north, formed at some point after the last regional glaciation, measure up to 100 meters (330 ft) high, with peaks accumulating in the areas just beyond the strongest wind speeds, where declining velocity wind deposited sand. The north and west boundaries of the desert are delineated by the fluvial systems Wadi Batha and Wadi Andam. Beneath the surface sands are an older layer of cemented carbonate sand. Alluvium deposits believed to have originated from the Wadi Batha during the Paleolithic era have been disclosed in the central desert 200 meters (660 ft) beneath the interdune surface. Wind erosion is believed to have contributed to the existence of a nearly level plain in the southwest.

== Inhabitants ==
The area is occupied by Bedouins who congregate at Al-Huyawah, an oasis near the border of the desert, between June and September to gather dates. Tribes present in the area at the time of the Royal Geographical Society expedition included, predominantly, Al Wahiba (or Yal Wahiba) for whom the region is named, Al-Amr, Al-Bu-Isa, Hikman, Hishm and Janaba.

== Gallery ==
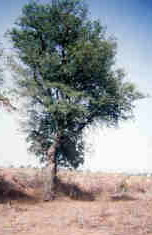
Ghaf trees
(Prosopis cineraria)

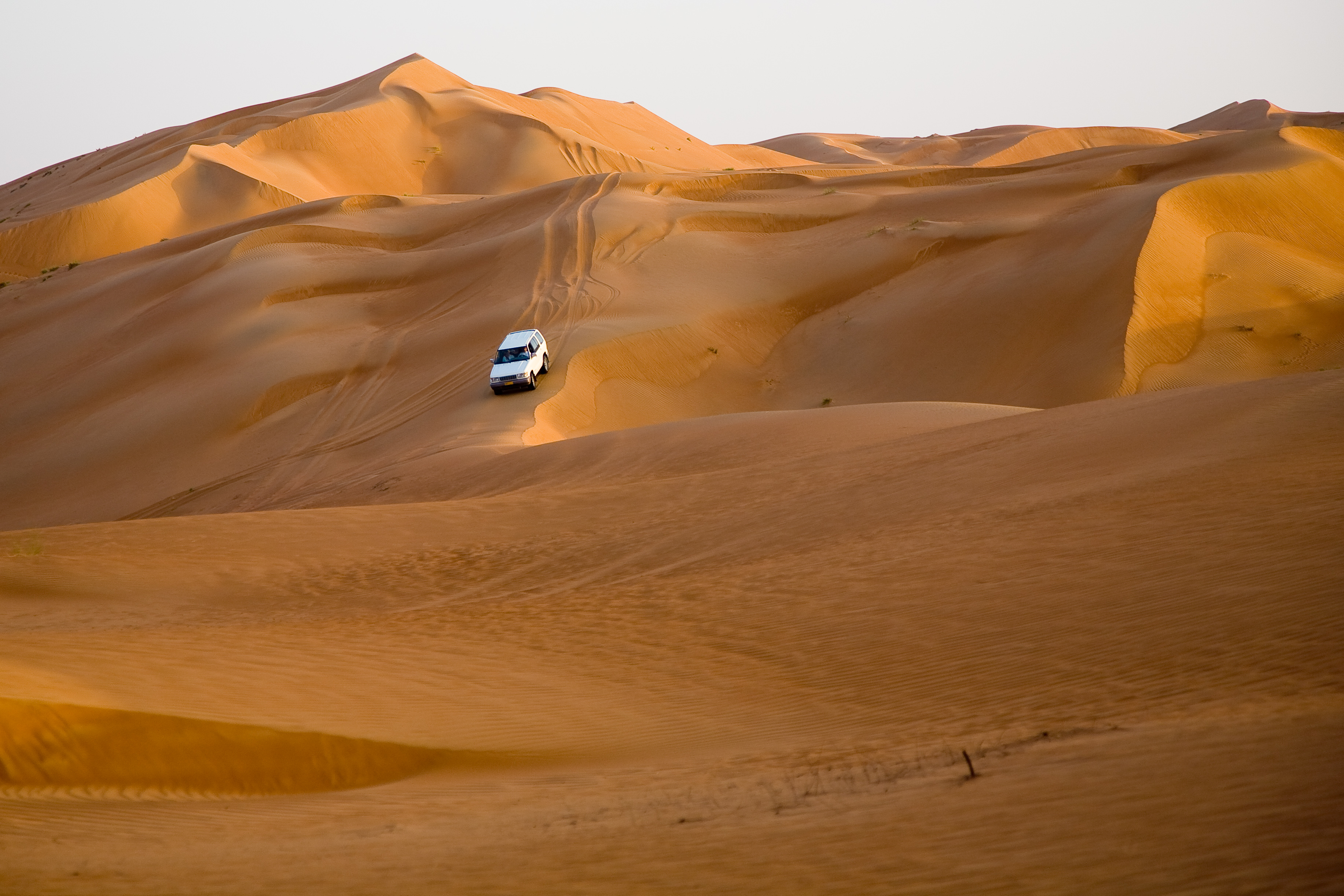

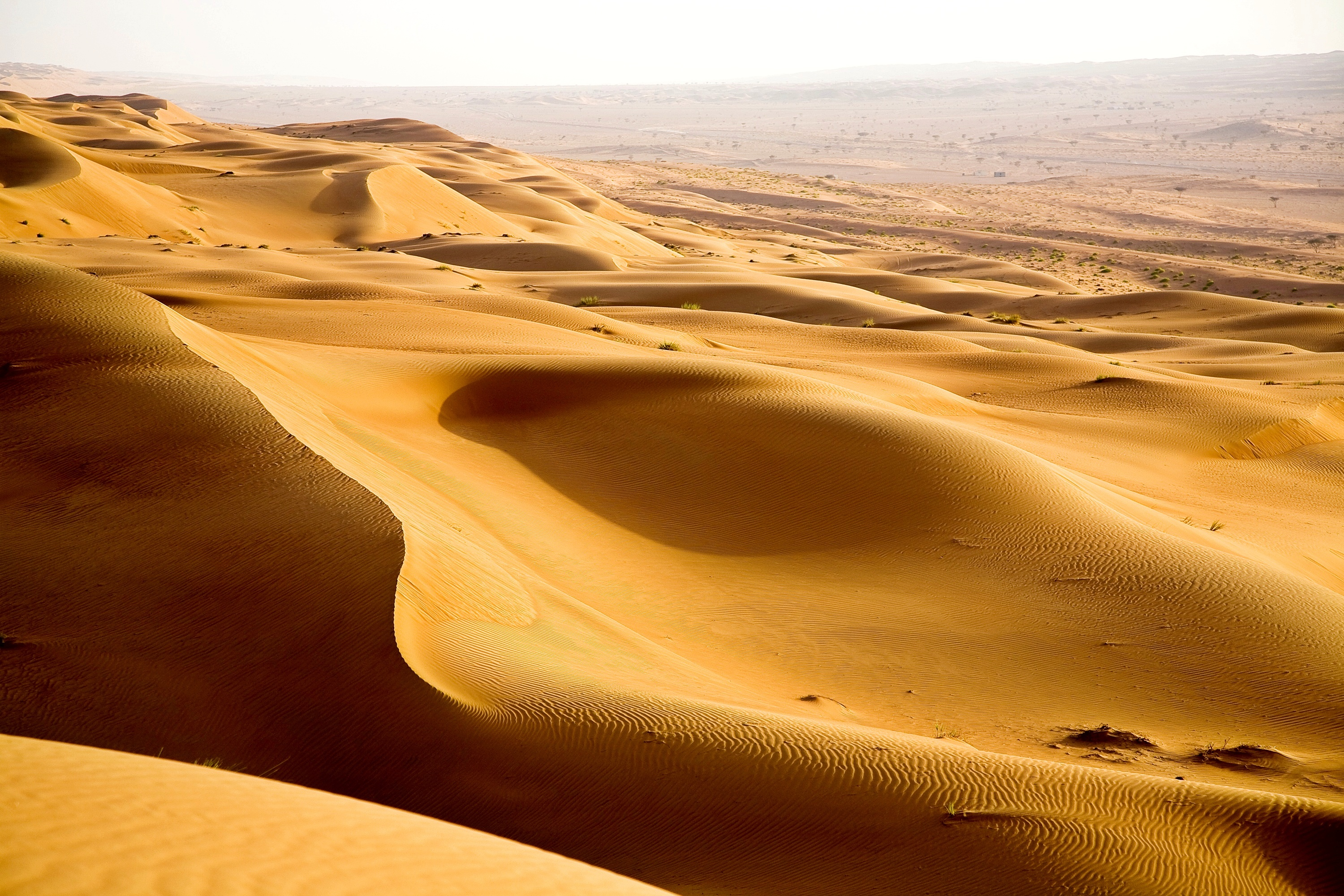

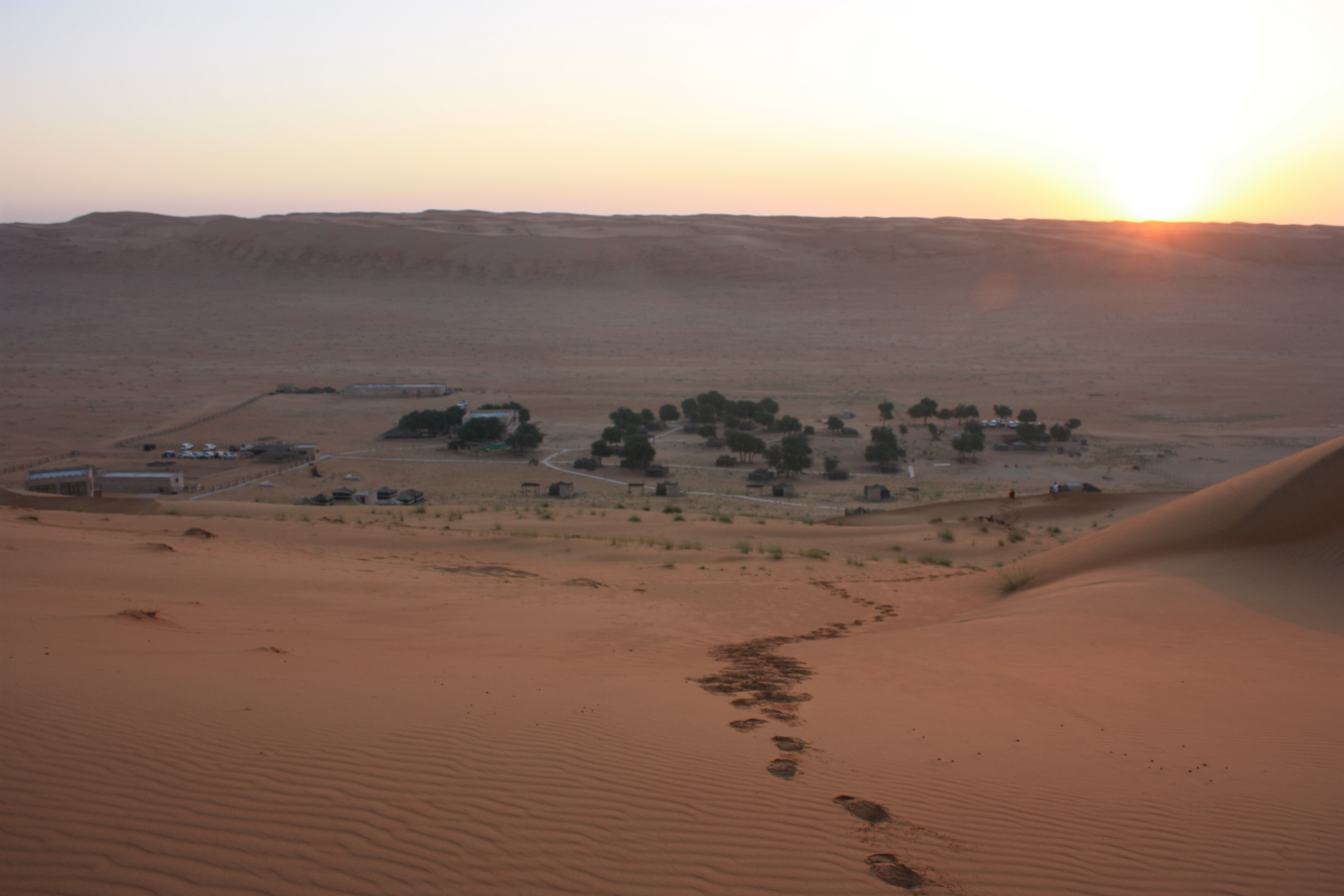
Sunrise

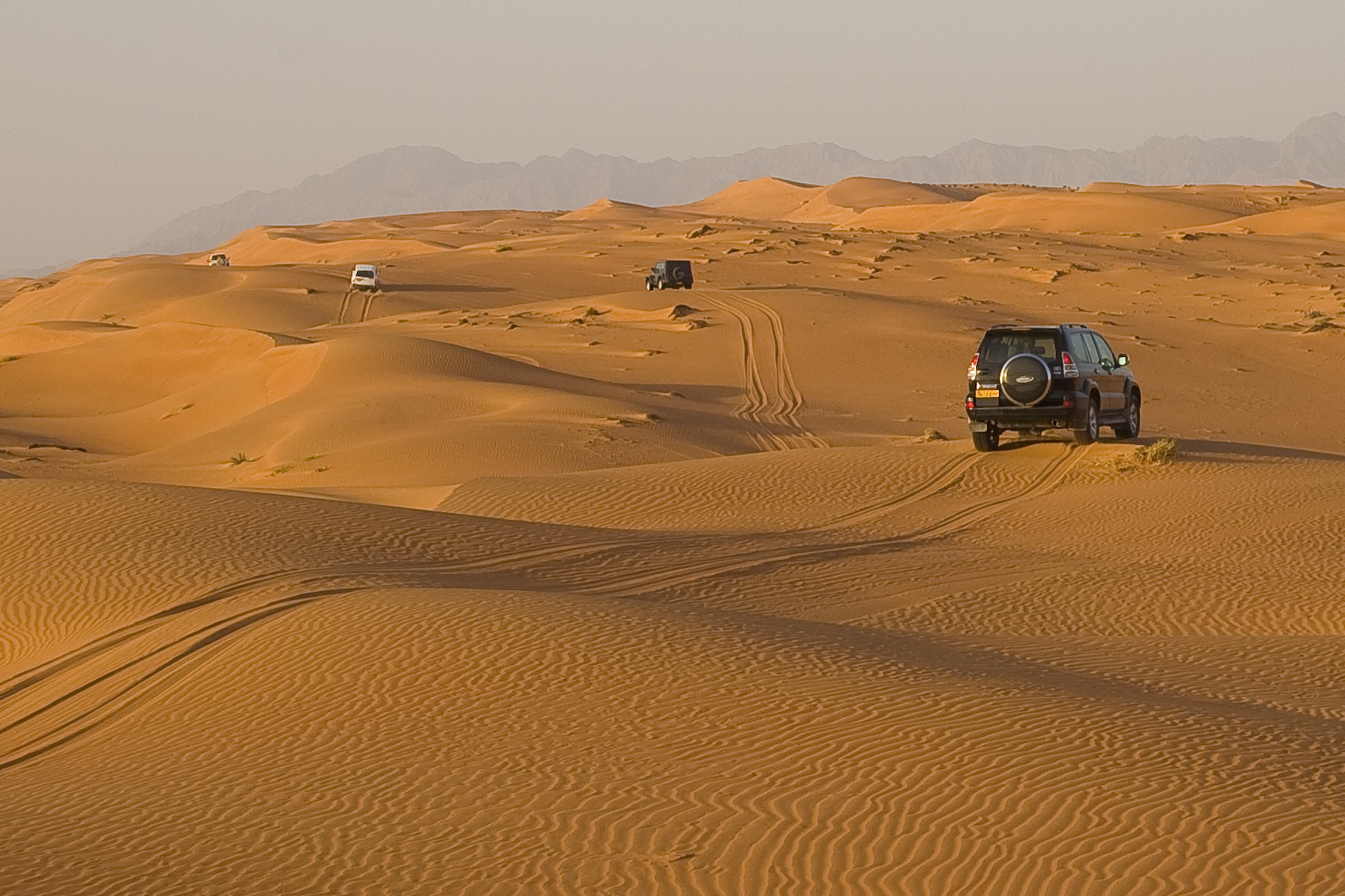
Vehicles on the dunes near the Eastern Hajar Mountains

== See also ==
- Arabian Desert
  - Al-Rub' Al-Khali
