= Al-Mudhaibi =

Coordinates: 22°34′N 58°07′E

Al-Mudhaibi المضيبي Mudhaybi, Mudaybi, Al Mudaybi
- Wilayat
- Interactive map of Al-Mudhaibi
- Country: Oman
- Governorate: Ash Sharqiyah
- Province: Al-Mudhaibi

Population (2020)
  - Total: 115,040

Al-Mudhaibi (Arabic: المضيبي) is the largest willaya in Ash Sharqiyah region of Oman. It has two niabas: Sinaw and Samad Ash Shan. Suq Sinaw is one of the most popular suqs in Oman. Dresses, khanjars and jewelry are sold there. It includes villages like Al Sudairah, Barzman, and Al Zahib.

On 25 November 2019, 45 well-preserved tombs covering a 50-80 square metre area and a settlement, dating back to beginning of the Iron Age, has been discovered in Al-Mudhaibi, specifically in Al Saleeli mountain by archaeologists from Oman and Heidelberg University. Archaeologists believed that the site belonged to the miners who were working in copper mining.

== Touristic monuments ==
There are many tourist attractions in the Wilayat of Al-Mudhaibi, including natural springs, falaj, caves, and modern parks. One of the most important springs in the state is Ain al-Harid, which gained fame from the nature of its water which is used to treat infectious diseases. Among the most important falajs in it are: al-Farsakhi – Bouminin, in addition to a group of other falajs. Caves are also spread in the Rawda Mountains and Mudar Mountains. As for the modern parks, one of them is in the Al-Ghashaiya area in Wadi Andam. And the other is in each of the towns of Suhaili, Wadi Daqiq, and Wadi Dhaa’a. Among the most important valleys in the Wilayat of Al-Mudhaibi is Wadi Andam. Among its villages are Al-Alia, Al-Habat, Mahlia, Al-Ghariyin and Al-Khadraa, Bani Difaa, as well as the Al-Dhaqiq area, which is located between the town of Lazq and Al-Maysar, and it has a valley named after the region.

== Traditional Industries ==
A collection of traditional industries, crafts, and arts are found in the state. Whereas agriculture is thought to be the first craft that the populace practices, some of the most well-known crops are: palm trees, lemons, alfalfa, and vegetables, as well as the crafts of grazing and camel rearing. Spinning and weaving, palm fronds, al-Qafr and semim, agricultural equipment, Omani sweets, and mat manufacturing are a few of the industries.

== Notable people ==
- Muhammad Harithi, Omani poet and writer
