= Wadi =

Hydrological feature

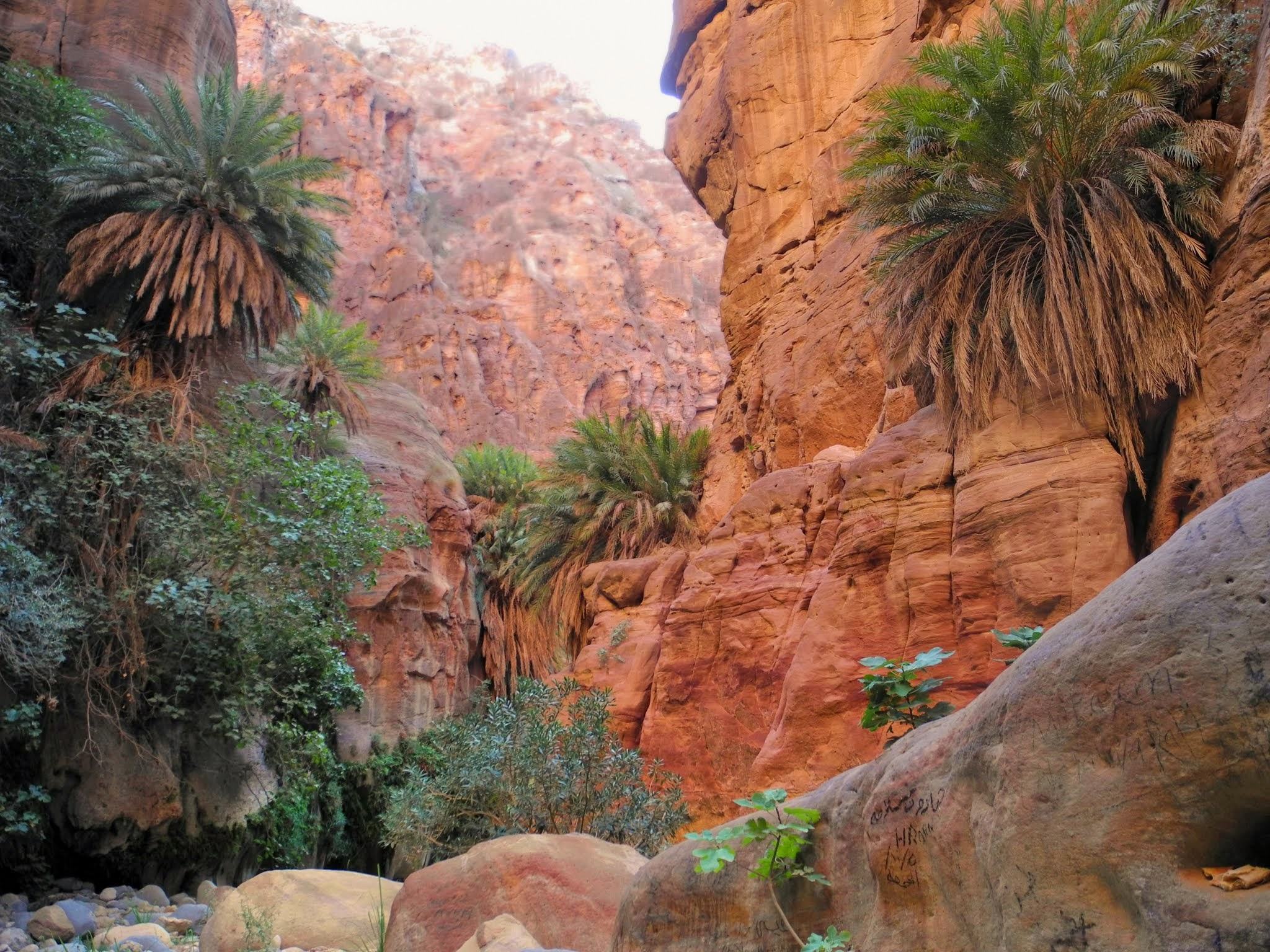
Wadi Ghuweir Trail to Feynan, Jordan

A wadi (/ˈwɒ.di/ WOD-ee; Arabic: وَادِي) is a river valley or a wet (ephemeral) riverbed that typically contains water only when heavy rain occurs, though wadis with year-round water flow do exist, such as Wadi Bani Khalid and Wadi Mawr. Wadis are located on gently sloping, nearly flat parts of deserts; commonly they begin on the lowest portions of alluvial fans and extend to inland sabkhas or dry lakes. Permanent channels rarely exist, due to lack of continual water flow. Water percolates down into the stream bed, causing an abrupt loss of energy and resulting in vast deposition. Wadis may develop dams of sediment that change the stream patterns in the next flash flood.

Wadis tend to be associated with centers of human population because sub-surface water is sometimes available in them. Nomadic and pastoral desert peoples will rely on seasonal vegetation found in wadis, even in regions as dry as the Sahara, as they travel in complex transhumance routes.

The centrality of wadis to water – and human life – in desert environments gave birth to the distinct sub-field of wadi hydrology in the 1990s.

== Etymology ==
The word 'wadi' is very widely found in Arabic toponyms. Some Spanish toponyms are derived from Andalusian Arabic where wadi was used to mean a permanent river, for example: Guadalcanal from wādī al-qanāl (Arabic: وَادِي الْقَنَال, "river of refreshment stalls"), Guadalajara from wādī al-ḥijārah (Arabic: وَادِي الْحِجَارَة, "river of stones"), or Guadalquivir, from al-wādī al-kabīr (Arabic: اَلْوَادِي الْكَبِير, "the great river").

== Sediments and sedimentary structures ==
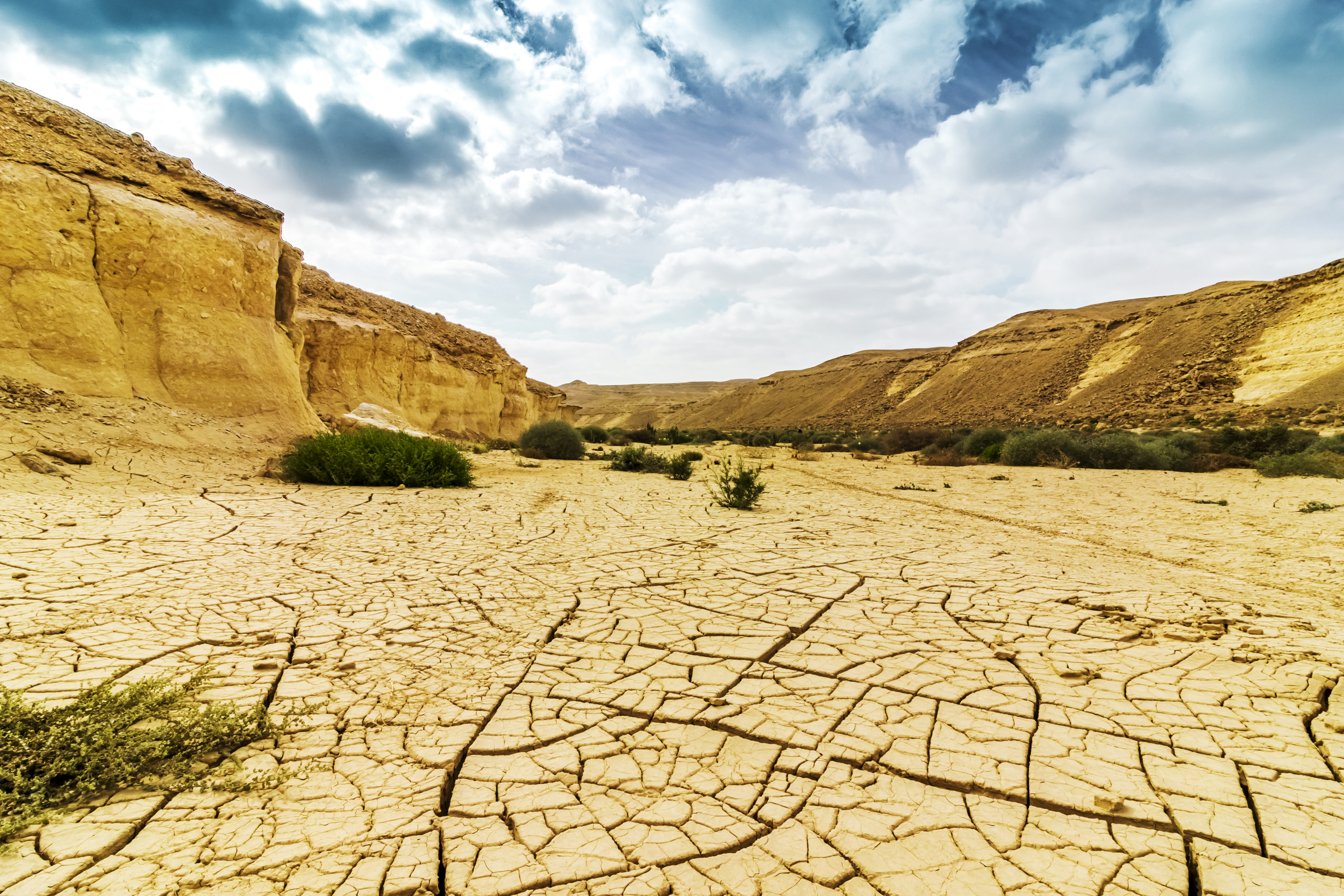
Wadi Degla in Egypt during the dry season

In basin and range topography, wadis trend along basin axes at the terminus of fans. They have braided stream patterns because of the deficiency of water and the abundance of sediments. Wadi sediments may contain a range of material, from gravel to mud, and the sedimentary structures vary widely. Thus, wadi sediments are the most diverse of all desert environments.

Flash floods result from severe energy conditions and can result in a wide range of sedimentary structures, including ripples and common plane beds. Gravels commonly display imbrications, and mud drapes show desiccation cracks. Wind activity also generates sedimentary structures, including large-scale cross-stratification and wedge-shaped cross-sets. A typical wadi sequence consists of alternating units of wind and water sediments; each unit ranging from about 10–30 cm (4–12 in). Sediment laid by water shows a complete fining upward sequence. Gravels show imbrication. Wind deposits are cross-stratified and covered with mud-cracked deposits. Some horizontal loess may also be present.

Wind also causes sediment deposition. When wadi sediments are underwater or moist, wind sediments are deposited over them. Thus, wadi sediments contain both wind and water sediments.

== Hydrological action ==
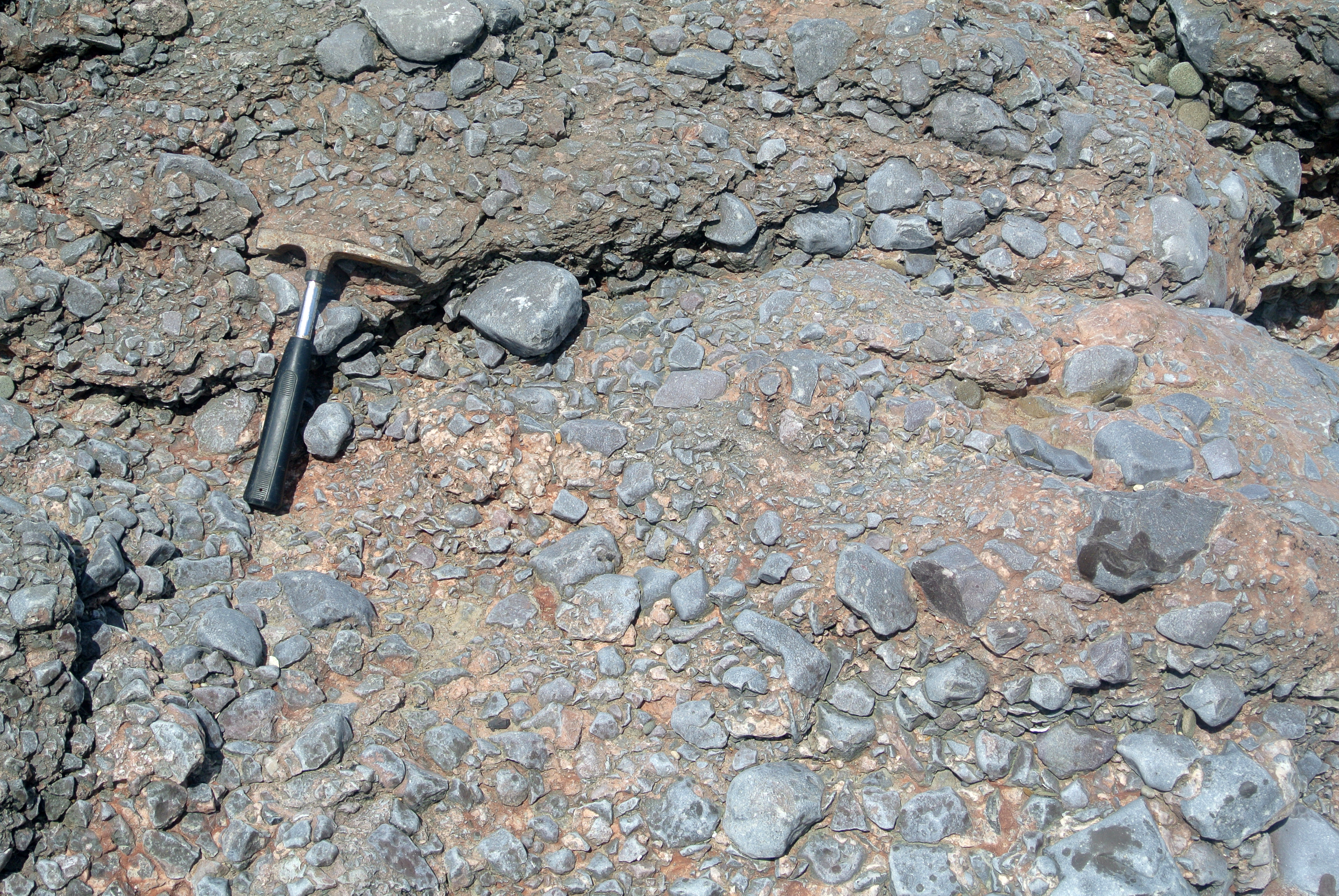
Triassic wadi deposit near Ogmore-by-Sea, Wales. Clasts are carboniferous limestone.

Modern English usage differentiates wadis from canyons or arroyo (Spanish, used in the Americas for similar landforms) by the action and prevalence of water. Wadis, as drainage courses, are formed by water and are distinguished from river valleys or gullies in that surface water is intermittent or ephemeral. Most wadis are dry year round, except after a rain. The desert environment is characterized by sudden but infrequent heavy rainfall, often resulting in flash floods. Crossing wadis at certain times of the year can be dangerous as a result.

=== Deposits ===
Deposition in a wadi is rapid because of the sudden loss of stream velocity and seepage of water into the porous sediment. Wadi deposits are thus usually mixed gravels and sands. These sediments are often altered by eolian processes.

Over time, wadi deposits may become "inverted wadis", where former underground water caused vegetation and sediment to fill in the eroded channel, turning previous washes into ridges running through desert regions.

== Gallery ==
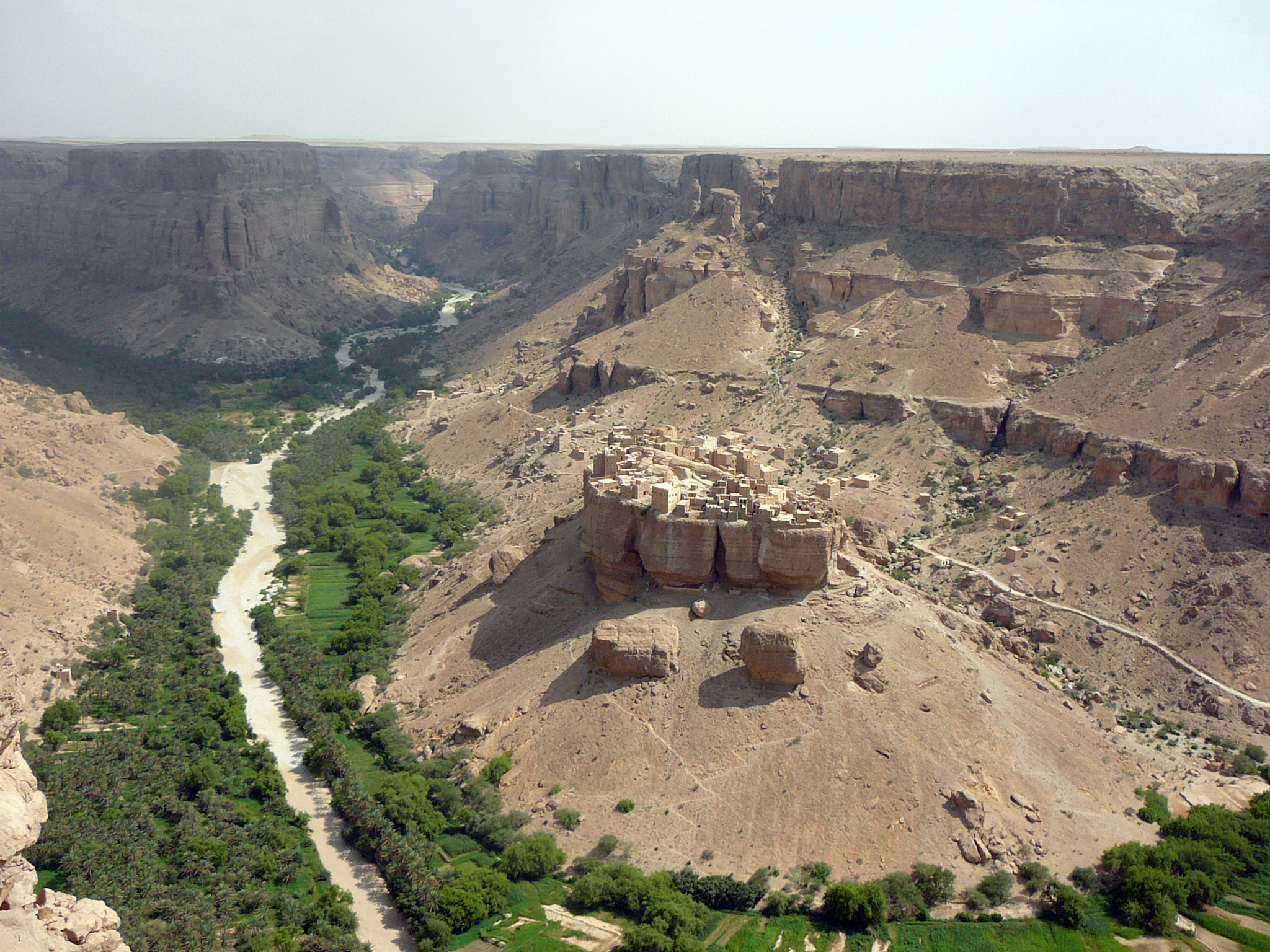
Haid al-Jazil in Wadi Dawan, Yemen

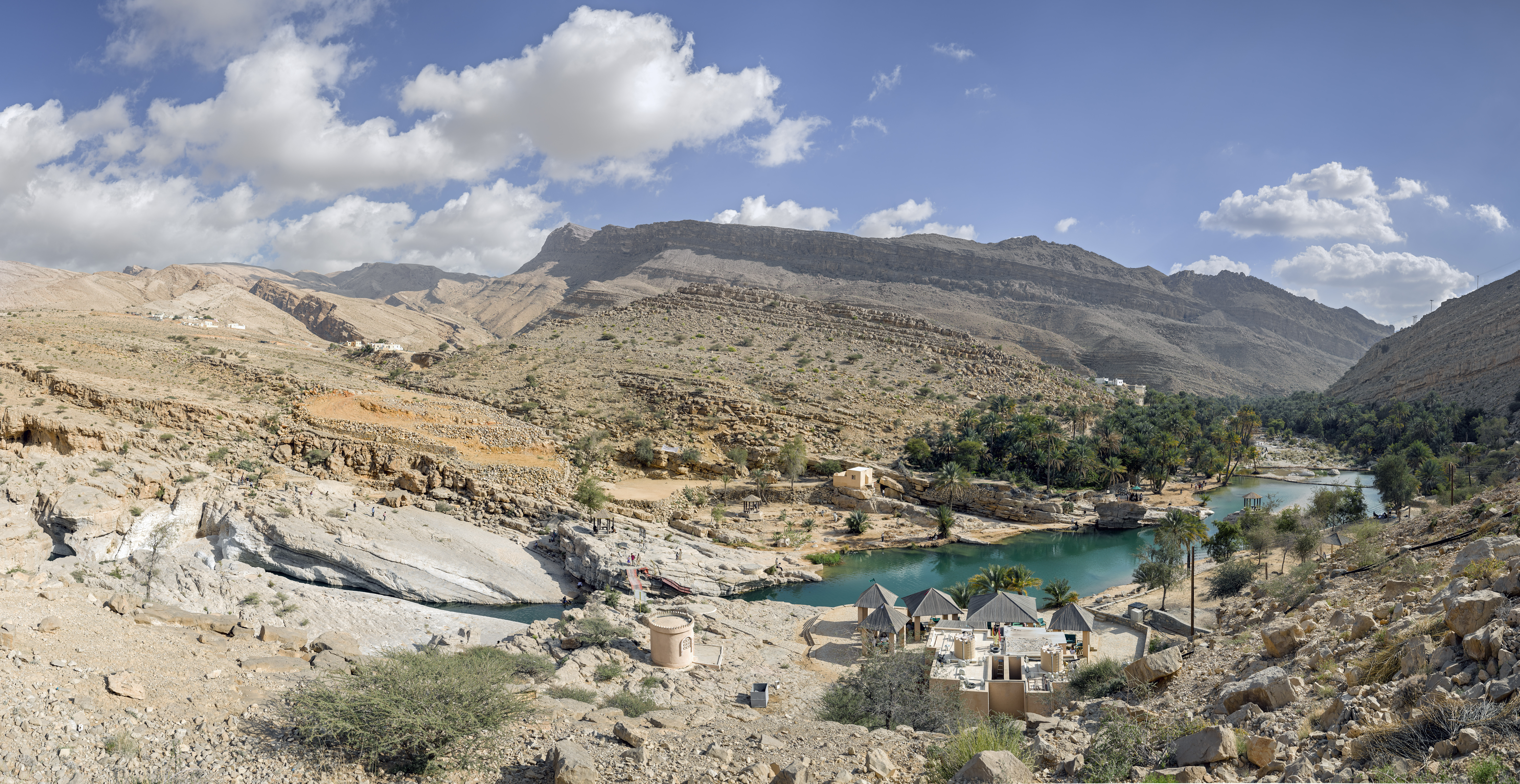
Wadi Bani Khalid in the Northern Governorate of Ash-Sharqiyyah Region, Oman, Arabian Peninsula

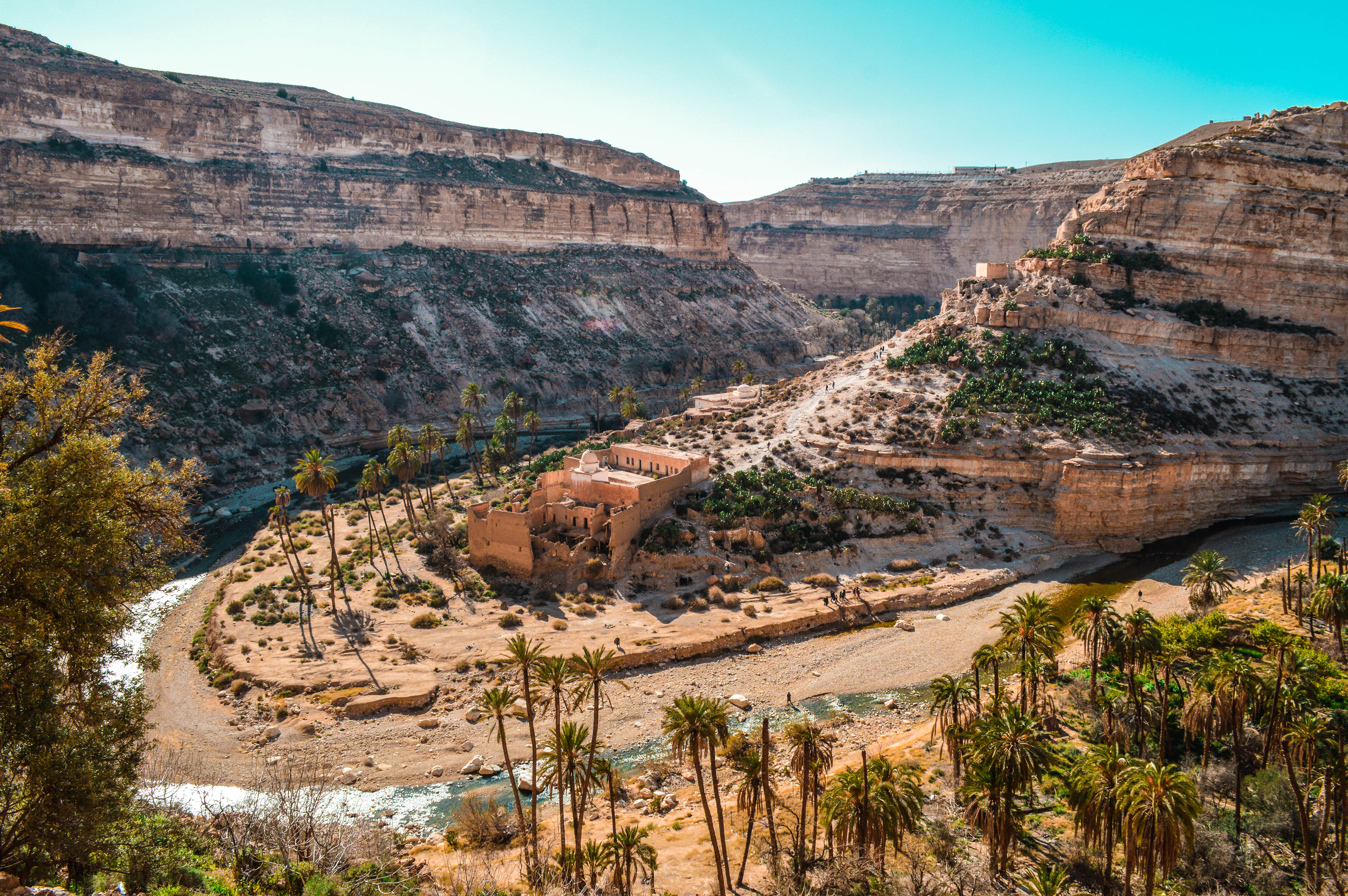
Abiod Valley in Algeria

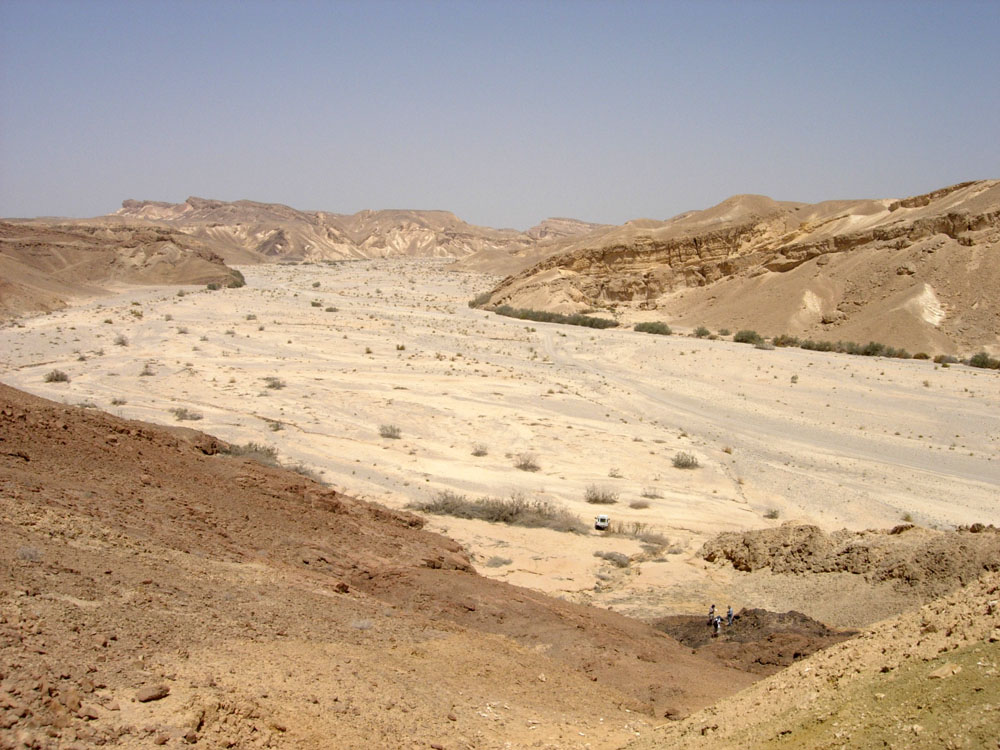
Wadi in Nahal Paran, Negev, Israel

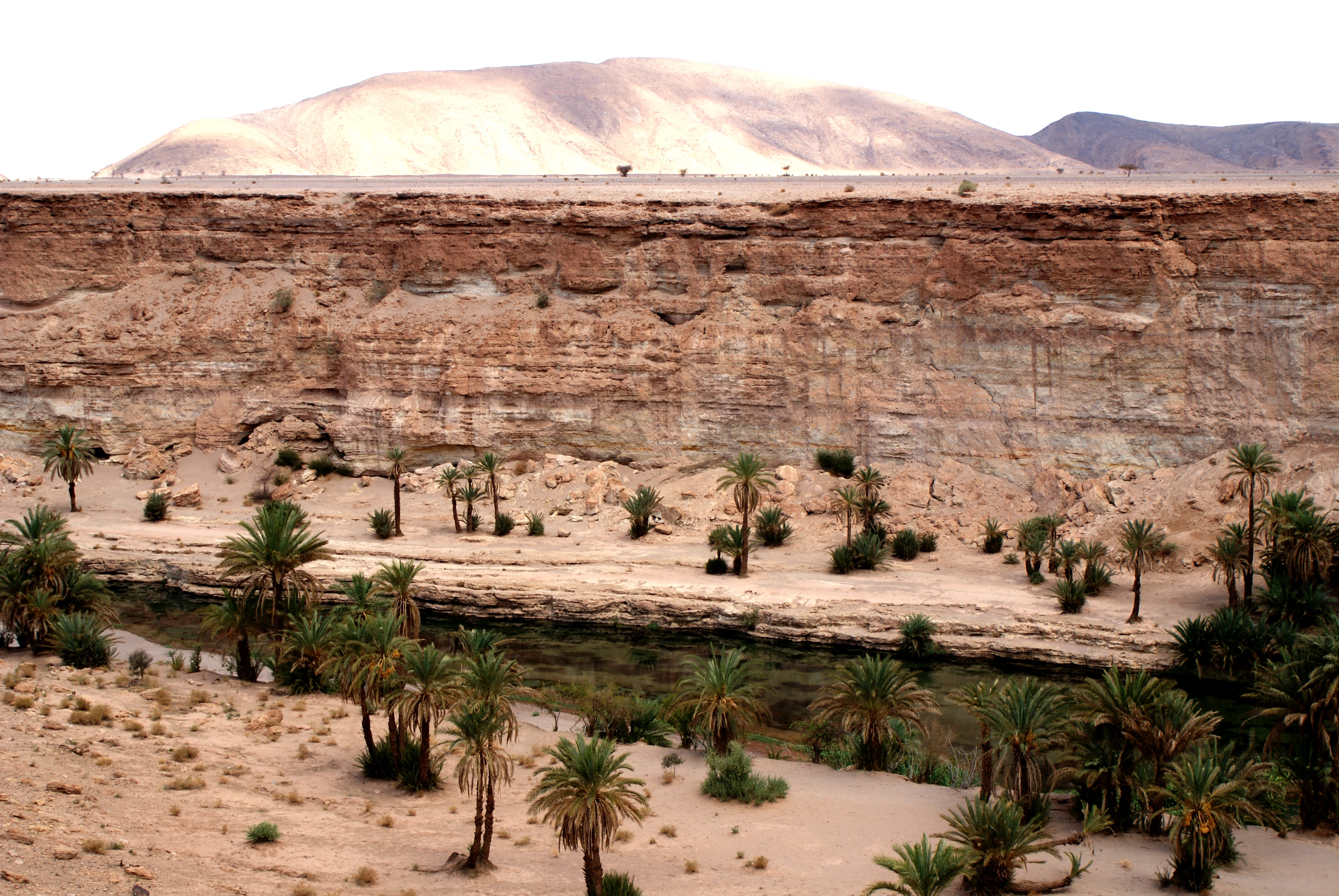
Oued Tissint, Morocco

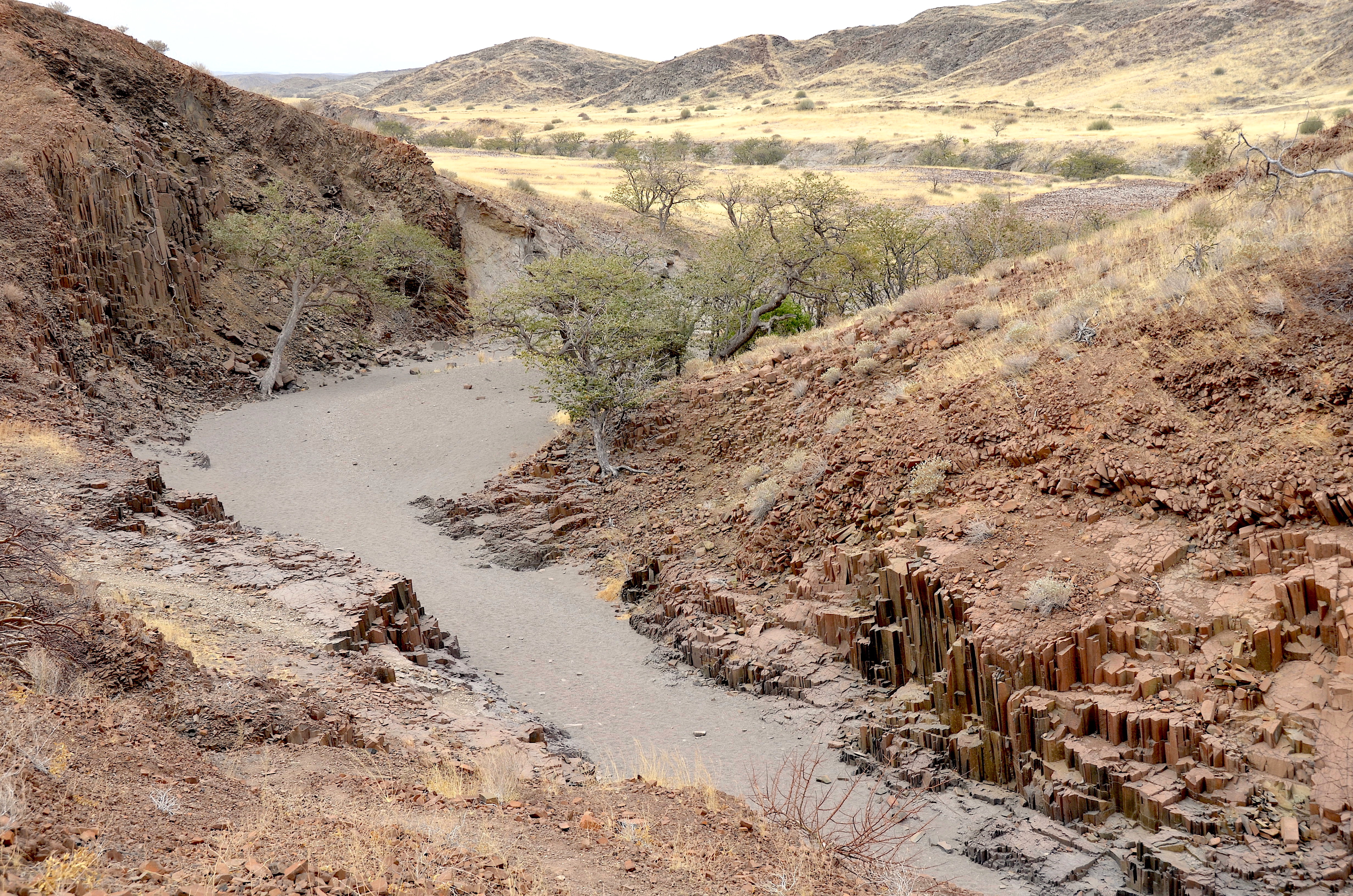
Dry fluvial channel cutting through columnar basalt in Namibia

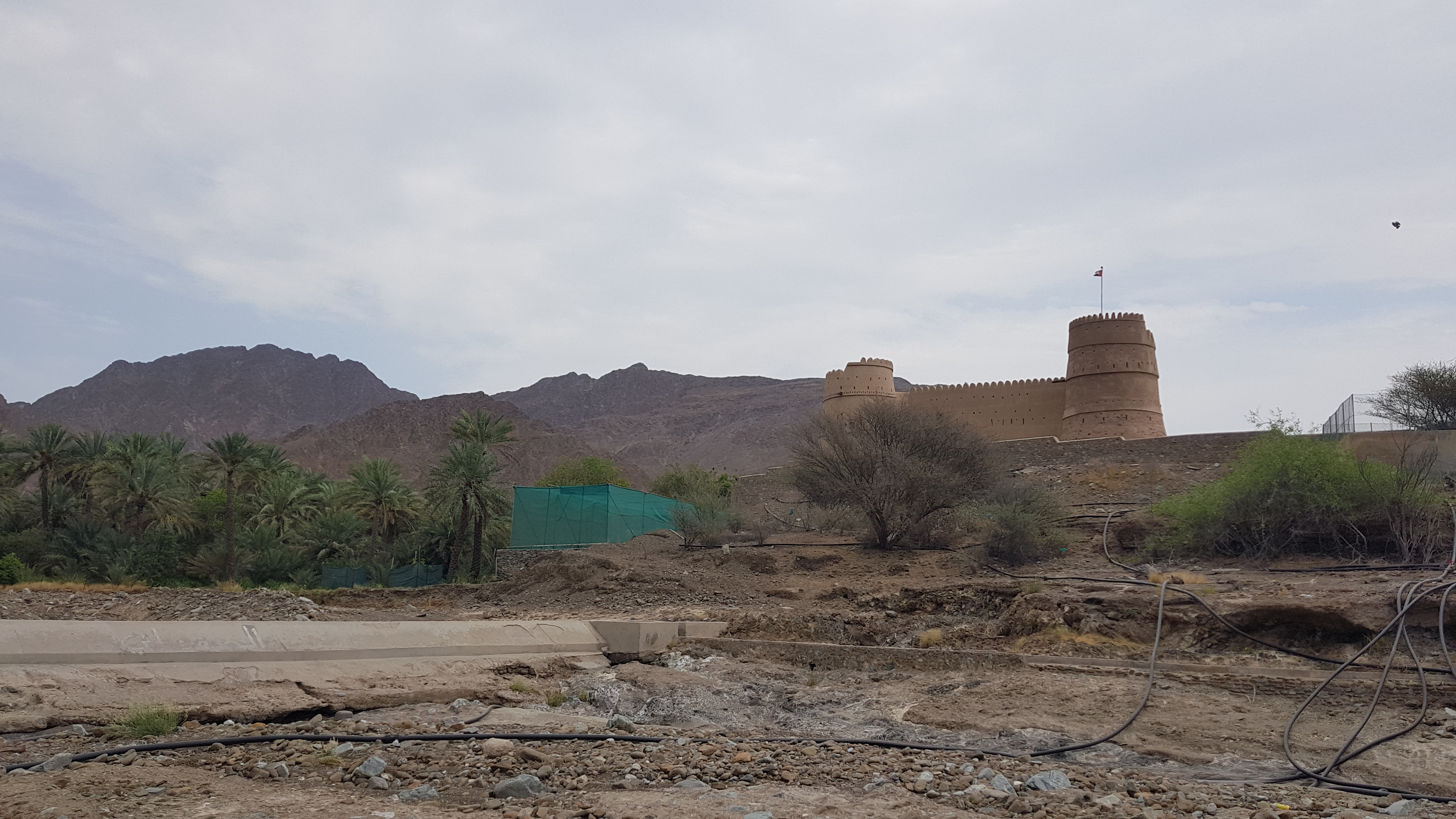
The Al Bithnah Fort in the Wadi Ham, United Arab Emirates

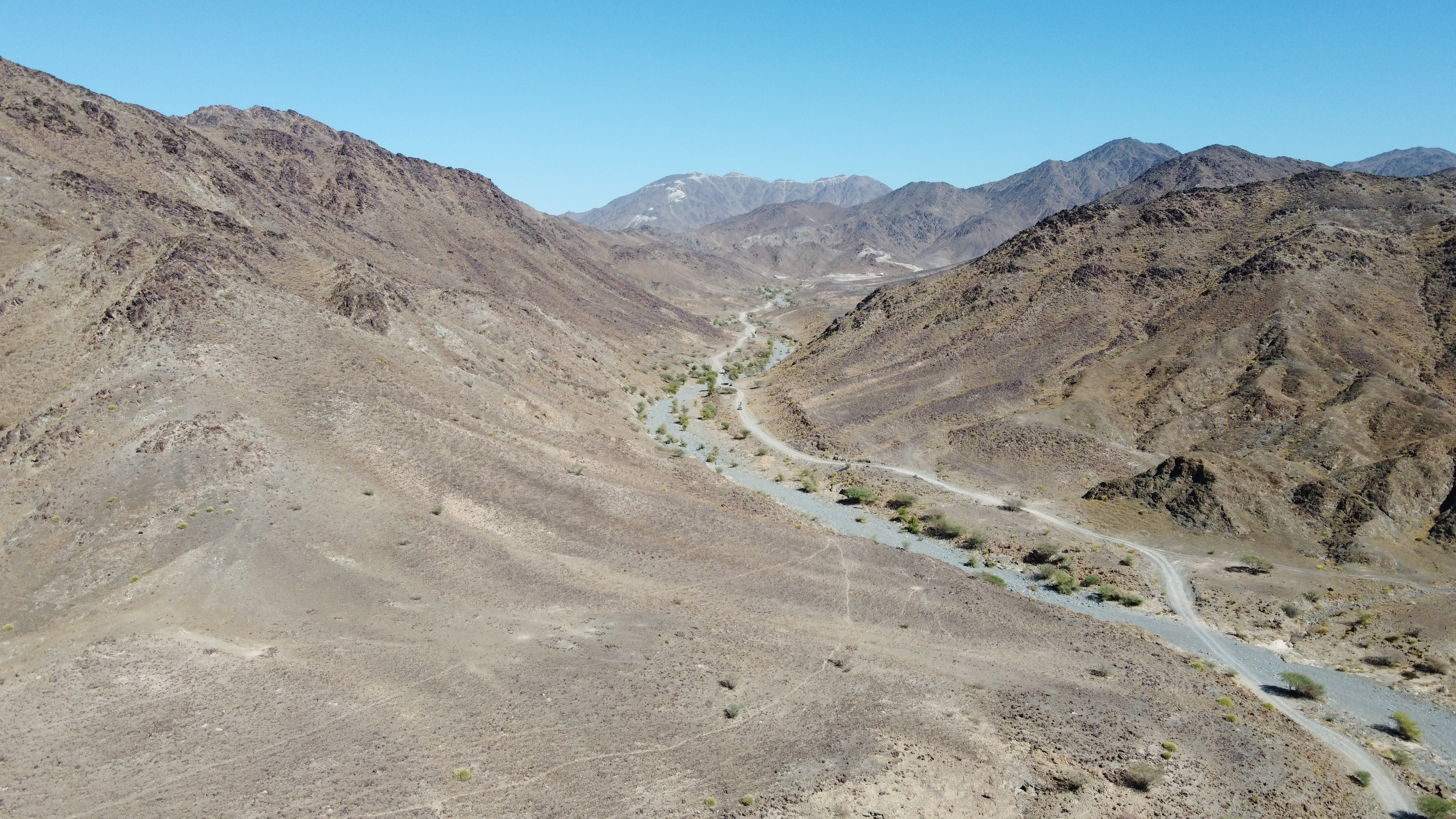
The Wadi Shawkah in the United Arab Emirates

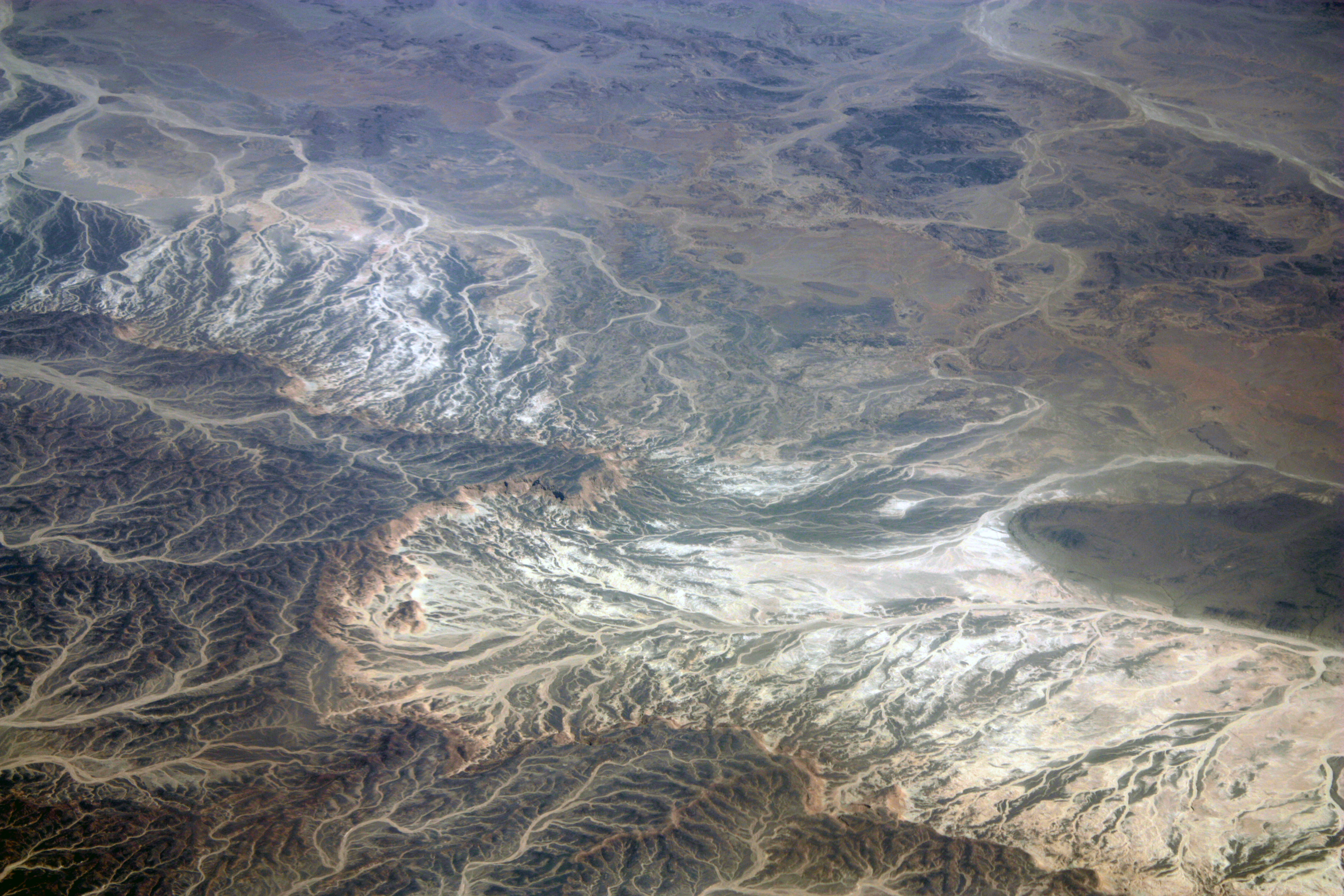
Wadis in northeastern Egypt

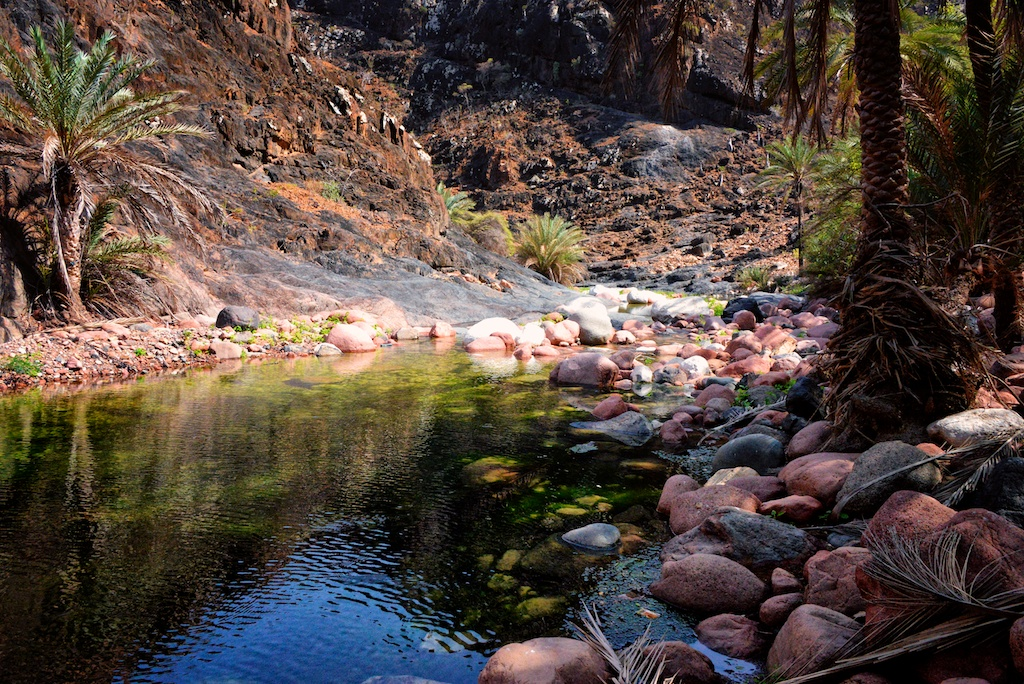
A wadi in Socotra, Yemen

== See also ==
- Alluvial desert – Type of desert earth surface
- Arroyo (watercourse) – Dry watercourse with flow after rain
- Canyon – Deep chasm between cliffs
- Coulee – Type of valley or drainage zone
- Gulch – Deep V-shaped valley formed by erosion
- Gully – Landform created by running water and/or mass movement eroding sharply into soil
- Intermittent river – River that periodically ceases to flow
- Oasis – Fertile area in a desert environment
- Wād Ṭuwā in the Sinai peninsula, holy Muslim site
