= Wadi Bani Khalid =

Watercourse in Oman

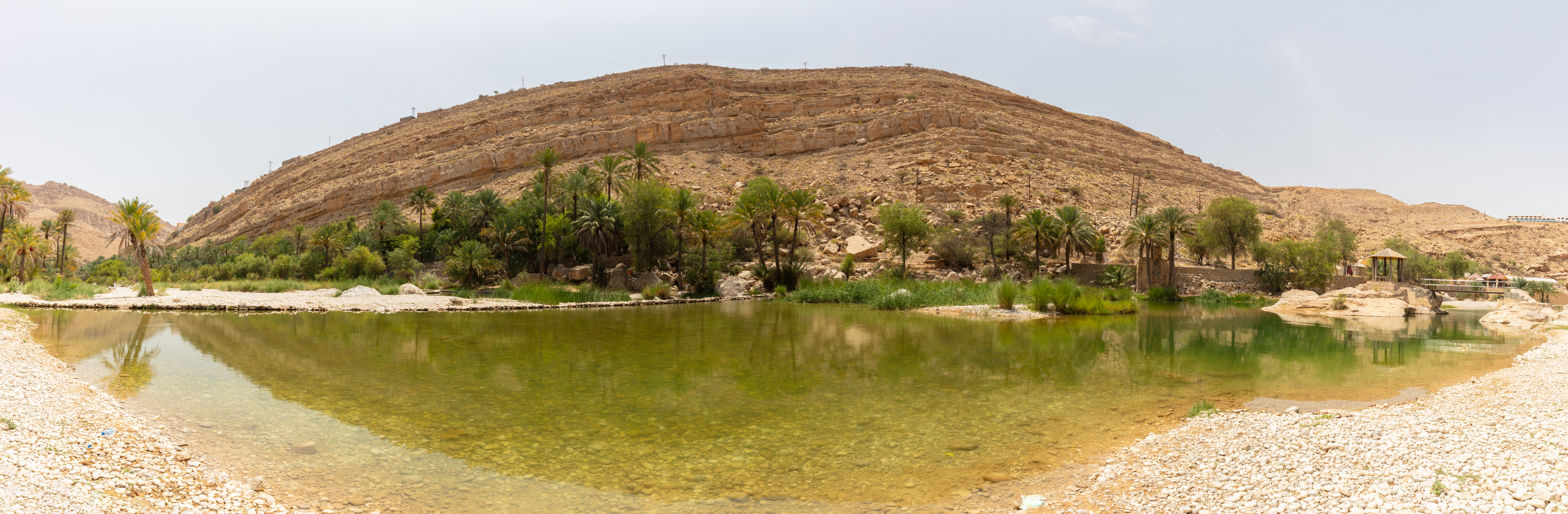
Panoramic view of the lake

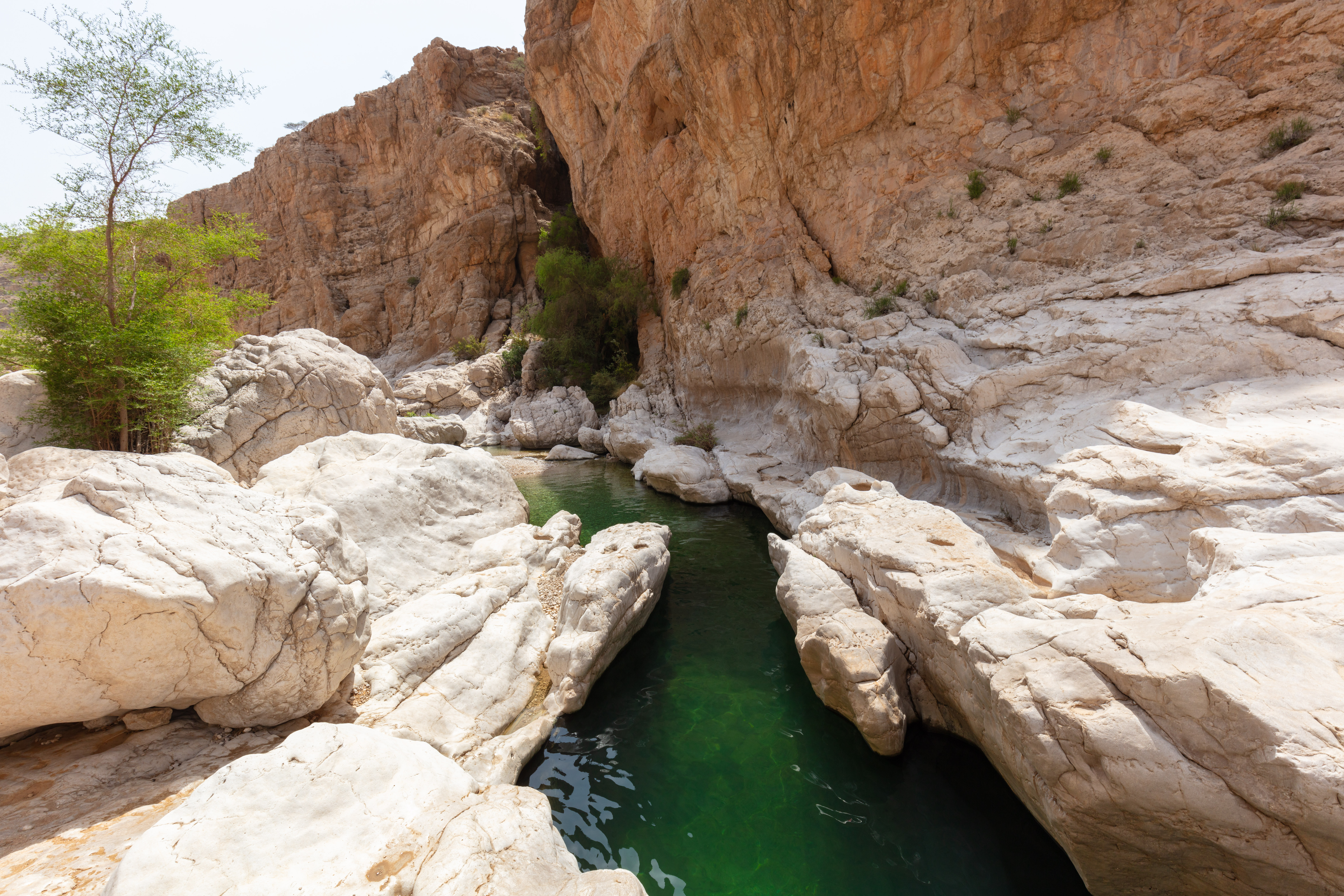
Water channel

Wādī Banī Khālid (Arabic: وَادِي بَنِي خَالِد) is a wadi and a tourist attraction in Oman. Large pools of water and boulders are scattered along the course of the wadi. As a geographical area, the wadi covers a large swathe of lowland and the Hajar Mountains.

Caves form some of the features of this wadi. These include Kahf Maqal (كَهْف مَقَل), which was described as an "underground chamber" of the Sultanate of Oman, or the best out of 4,000 caves. Aflāj (underground canals) and springs are also common in this wadi, including ʿAin Ḥamūdah (عَيْن حَمُوْدَة), ʿAin aṣ-Ṣārūj (عَيْن ٱلصَّارُوْج) and ʿAin Dawwah (عَيْن دَوَّه).

It contains the Muqal Cave.

== See also ==
- List of wadis of Oman
  - Wadi Bani Awf
