= List of World Heritage Sites in Oman =

Location of World Heritage Sites in Oman. Blue dots indicate the sites of the Land of Frankincense while green are the sites of the Aflaj Irrigation Systems.

The United Nations Educational, Scientific and Cultural Organization (UNESCO) designates World Heritage Sites of outstanding universal value to cultural or natural heritage which have been nominated by signatories to the 1972 UNESCO World Heritage Convention. Cultural heritage consists of monuments (such as architectural works, monumental sculptures, or inscriptions), groups of buildings, and sites (including archaeological sites). Natural features (consisting of physical and biological formations), geological and physiographical formations (including habitats of threatened species of animals and plants), and natural sites which are important from the point of view of science, conservation or natural beauty, are defined as natural heritage. Oman accepted the convention on 6 October 1981, making its historical sites eligible for inclusion on the list. It has five World Heritage Sites and a further seven sites on the tentative list.

The first site listed in Oman was the Bahla Fort in 1987, while the most recent one was the Ancient City of Qalhat in 2018. All five sites are listed for their cultural significance. Bahla Fort was listed as endangered in 1988 because of the degradation of the structure. In 2004, after reconstruction, it was removed from the endangered list. The Arabian Oryx Sanctuary, originally listed for its natural significance in 1994, was directly delisted in 2007, the first World Heritage Site to lose its status, as Oman had substantially reduced the protected area and commenced oil extraction, and because of the falling oryx population. Oman has served on the World Heritage Committee three times.

== World Heritage Sites ==
UNESCO lists sites under ten criteria; each entry must meet at least one of the criteria. Criteria i through vi are cultural, and vii through x are natural.

World Heritage Sites
Site	Image	Location (governorate)	Year listed	UNESCO data	Description
Bahla Fort	A large mudbrick fort with several towers	Ad Dakhiliyah	1987	433; iv (cultural)	The large mudbrick fort and the adjacent small oasis settlement date to the late Middle Ages, between the 12th and 15th centuries, and were constructed by the Banu Nebhan tribe. Bahla was the centre of Ibadi Islam. The fort is a pre-gunpowder building with round watchtowers and castellated parapets. Due to deterioration of the structure, the site was listed as endangered in 1988. Upon reconstruction, it was removed from the endangered list in 2004.
Archaeological Sites of Bat, Al-Khutm and Al-Ayn	A circular ancient tomb made of cut stone	Al Dhahirah	1988	434; iii, iv (cultural)	This site comprises three clusters of ancient necropolises and settlements from the Early Bronze Age, in the 3rd millennium BCE. During that period, the area was important for extraction of copper which was exported to Mesopotamia and possibly to the Indus Valley. The earliest constructions are in mudbrick while later are made with cut stone. Tombs from different periods have different styles. There are beehive tombs, dry-stone cairn tombs, small single-chambered, and elaborate multi-chambered tombs. A mound at Al-Ayn is pictured.
Land of Frankincense	A frankincense tree in a desert	Dhofar	2000	1010; iii, iv (cultural)	Frankincense, resin of the Boswellia sacra tree (pictured), was one of the most important luxury items of the Classical antiquity. This site comprises Wadi Dawkah where frankincense was collected, a trading post and caravan supply station at Shisr, and ports of Khor Rori and Al-Baleed which were heavily fortified. Khor Rori started to decline in the 5th century while Al-Baleed lost its role with the arrival of European trade in the 15th century. The site was originally listed as The Frankincense Trail but renamed to its present name in 2005.
Aflaj Irrigation Systems of Oman	Stone walls of an irrigation channel	Ad Dakhiliyah, Al Batinah, Ash Sharqiyah South	2006	1207; v (cultural)	Aflaj is a traditional irrigation system in Oman that has been in use since at least the year 500. Groundwater or spring water is collected and delivered through a series of underground or surface channels to the settlements for domestic or agricultural purposes. The enclosed settlements, forts, palaces, watchtowers, and temporary dwellings used during the date harvest shape the cultural landscape that was made possible by irrigation of this otherwise harsh and very dry desert land. There are around 3,000 functioning aflaj systems in Oman that still provide a large part of the water used in the country. The World Heritage Site comprises five representative sites, Falaj Daris is pictured.
Ancient City of Qalhat	Ruins of a mausoleum in a desert	Ash Sharqiyah South	2018	1537; i, iii (cultural)	Qalhat flourished as the secondary capital of the Kingdom of Hormuz between the 11th and 16th centuries. It was a major trading hub for dates, Arabian horses, pearls, and incense, with trade routes extending to India, China, and East Africa. The city was attacked by the Portuguese in the 16th century and abandoned afterwards. The site comprises the remains of the city, its fortifications, and necropolises. Bibi Maryam mausoleum is pictured.

== Tentative list ==
In addition to sites inscribed on the World Heritage List, member states can maintain a list of tentative sites that they may consider for nomination. Nominations for the World Heritage List are only accepted if the site was previously listed on the tentative list. Oman lists seven properties on its tentative list.

Tentative sites
Site	Image	Location (governorate)	Year listed	UNESCO criteria	Description
The forts of Rostaq and al-Hazm	Fortress walls with palm trees and a city in the background	Al Batinah South	1998	(cultural)	Located in a large oasis, the fort at Rustaq dates to the preislamic period when it was an important market place. Later additions include four towers and outer walls (pictured). There are several ancient houses remaining, as well as a funerary mosque. The Al Hazm Castle dates to the 18th century. It was built under the Yaruba dynasty. It is a rectangular two-storey structure with a narrow inner courtyard.
Al Hallaniyyat Islands Proposed Nature Reserve	Rocky barren island with some boats in the sea	Dhofar	2013	x (natural)	The islands are barren with sparse Tamarix and Acacia trees. The surrounding sea is rich in corals and is home to numerous fish species, as well as dolphins and whales. The sandy beaches are important grounds for loggerhead sea turtles and green turtles to lay their eggs. There are numerous bird species, such as the masked booby, Audubon's shearwater, and red-billed tropicbird nesting on the islands as there are no predators.
Bar al Hakman Proposed Nature Reserve		Al Wusta	2013	x (natural)	Bar al Hakman peninsula has sandy dunes, mudflats, mangrove forests, and marine habitats with seagrass meadows and coral reefs. The area is important for migratory birds that gather here in winter in large numbers, with 140 species reported. It is also important for sea turtles that lay their eggs here.
Smahan's Mountain Nature Reserve		Dhofar	2013	vii, x (natural)	The reserve is the largest protected area in the country. The rugged terrain comprises plateaus, canyons, wadis, and escarpments. The area is home to the critically endangered Arabian leopard and Dhofar shrew, as well as the Nubian ibex, Arabian gazelle, and caracal.
al Dimaniyyat Islands Nature Reserve	Rocky barren island with a flag pole	Muscat	2013	x (natural)	The islands are important for hawksbill sea turtles and green turtles that lay their eggs there. There are numerous bird species, such as the red-billed tropicbird and different species of terns nesting on the islands. The surrounding sea is home to corals, sea snakes, three species of dolphins, and humpback whales.
Ras al Had Turtle Reserve and the Heritage Site of Ras al Jinz	Beach with some boats in water	Ash Sharqiyah South	2013	ii, iii, x (mixed)	The reserve extends 45 km (28 mi) along the coast and comprises sandy and rocky beaches, two lagoons, and mangrove bushes. The beaches are important nesting grounds for green turtles, with thousands visiting every year to lay their eggs. There are also archaeological remains in the reserve, with graves and settlements from the early Holocene to the Iron Age. Finds include objects that originated in Bronze Age India.
Cultural Landscape of Bisya & Salut and its Archaeological Remains		Ad Dakhiliyah	2014	ii, iii, iv, v, vi (cultural)	The area, located at a meeting point of two wadis, has several archaeological sites from Bronze and Iron Age. There are remains of settlements form as early as the 4th millennium BCE when people practiced agriculture, made possible by irrigation. There are also monuments and numerous tombs from different periods. The material remains indicate people traded with the civilizations of Mesopotamia, Iran, and Indus Valley.

== Former site ==
World Heritage Sites
Site	Image	Location (governorate)	Year listed	UNESCO data	Description
Arabian Oryx Sanctuary	An orys behind a fence, desert landscape	Al Wusta	1994	654; x (natural)	The desert with diverse flora, including several endemic plants, was chosen as one of the sites for the reintroduction of the Arabian oryx, an antelope species extinct in the wild in 1972, and brought here in 1982. In 2007, the site was directly delisted (without prior listing as endangered) as Oman had substantially reduced the protected area and commenced oil extraction, and because of the falling oryx population.

== See also ==
- Tourism in Oman
