= Mausoleum of Bibi Maryam =

14th-century mausoleum in Qalhat, Oman

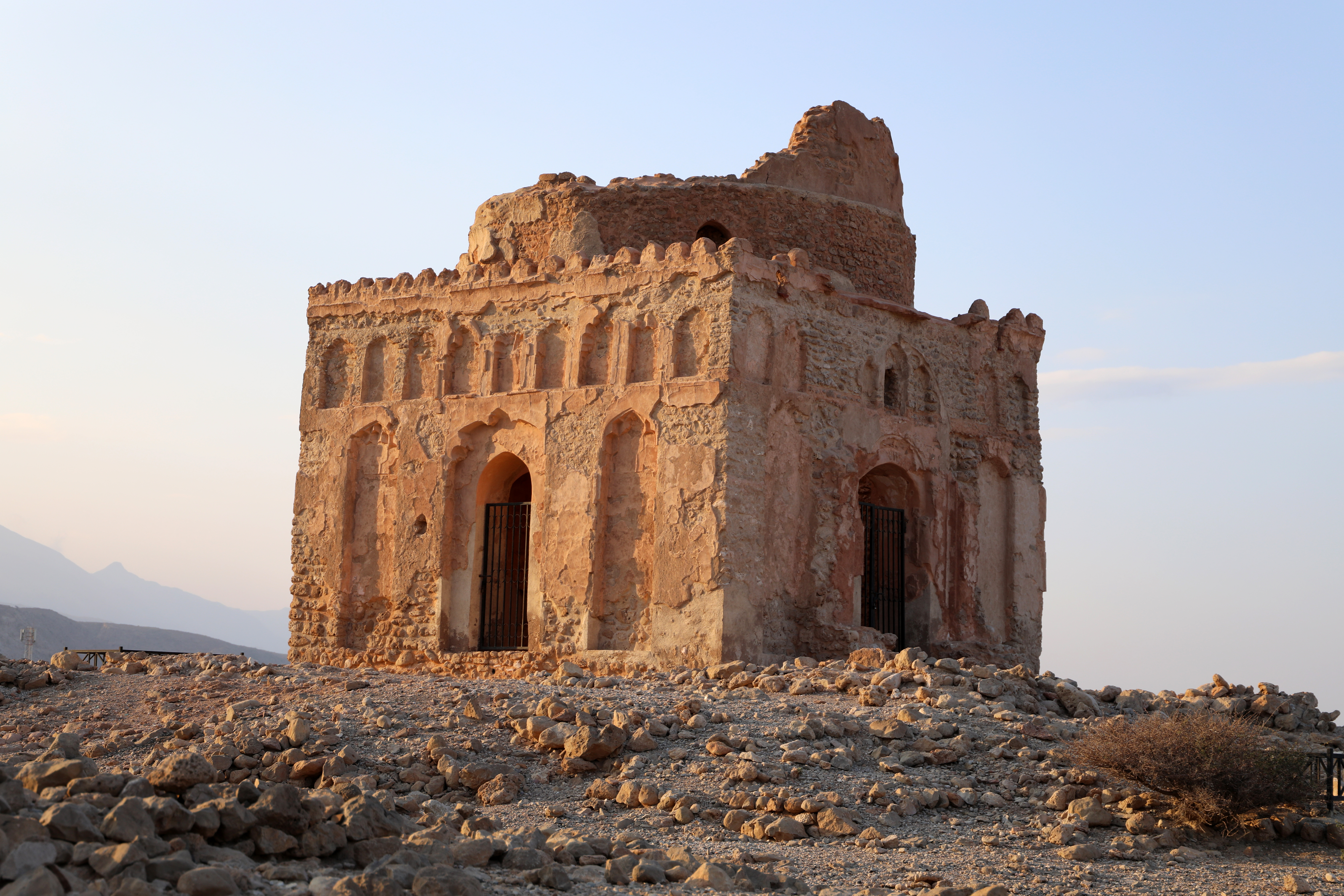
- The remains of the mausoleum
- Interactive map of Mausoleum of Bibi Maryam
- 22°41′47.98″N 59°22′22.44″E
- Location: Qalhat, Ash Sharqiyah South Governorate, Oman

History
- Built: Early 14th century

The Mausoleum of Bibi Maryam is an early 14th-century Islamic tomb located in the ancient port city of Qalhat, Oman. It is the only fully surviving architectural monument of the ancient city, which served as the twin capital of the Kingdom of Hormuz. The structure is notable for its unique stone-built adaptation of Iranian and Central Asian domed mausoleum designs, and its intricate exterior and interior stucco and tile decoration.

Today, the mausoleum serves as the focal point of the Qalhat archaeological park, which was inscribed as a UNESCO World Heritage Site in 2018.

== History ==
The mausoleum was constructed in the early 14th century (c. 1300–1320), during a period of massive urban expansion in Qalhat under the rule of the Hormuzi governor Baha al-Din Ayaz and his wife, Bibi Maryam. Omani tradition associates the building with Bibi Maryam, though archaeological consensus suggests she may have originally built it as a tomb for her husband, Ayaz (who died c. 1311), before eventually being buried there herself.

The mausoleum survived the violent sack of Qalhat by the Portuguese under Afonso de Albuquerque in August 1508. While Albuquerque's forces systematically burned the city's Great Mosque and principal houses, the Bibi Maryam mausoleum, located in the western corner of the walled city near the coastal track to the mountains, was left standing. Although it remains the most prominent monument at the site, it was originally part of a larger funerary area. This included two adjacent mausoleums located on the opposite side of the coastal track; these were part of architectural complexes that are now largely destroyed and minimally visible on the surface.

Over the centuries, as Qalhat was abandoned, the mausoleum became a famous visit place for travelers. British explorer James Raymond Wellsted visited the ruins in 1835 and noted that the interior was still covered in brightly colored glazed tiles bearing Quranic inscriptions in relief. By the late 19th century, many of these tiles had been removed or plundered.

== Architecture ==
The mausoleum is a centric-type pavilion mausoleum. While its design shares similarities with domed tombs of the Seljuk and Ilkhanid periods in Iran and Central Asia, it is unique for being constructed out of small coral blocks and limestone embedded in a thick grey earthen mortar, rather than the traditional baked brick used in eastern Islamic lands.

The mausoleum originally standing approximately 11 meters high, the building features a square base measuring roughly 8 by 8 meters, rising to a height of 5.8 meters. The base is crowned with a row of small merlons. Above this, squinches transition the square base into an octagonal and then hexadecagonal drum, which supported a raised dome spanning 6.6 meters in diameter. The dome is now largely destroyed. Unlike typical brick mausoleums where all facades are identical, the four exterior faces of the Bibi Maryam Mausoleum are distinctly asymmetrical, achieving their decoration through heavily carved mortar and stucco rather than brickwork. The east facade contains a monumental arched portal, four meters wide, which served as the primary entrance to the underground crypt. Opposite this, the west, or qibla, facade contains a large, protruding rectangular buttress that shelters the interior mihrab. Meanwhile, the north and south facades both contain doors and are decorated with varying arrangements of shallow niches.

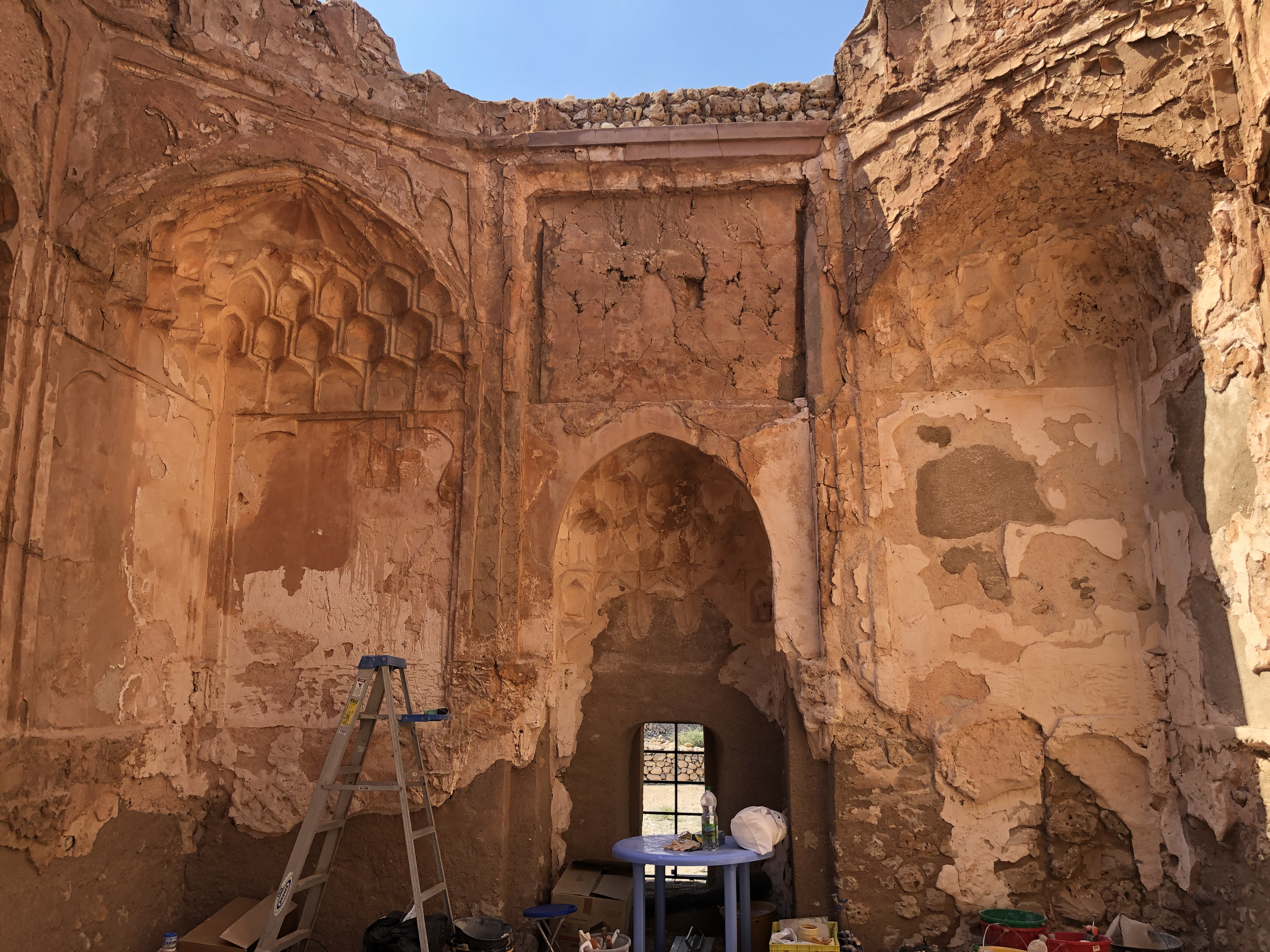
Inside the mausoleum

The upper register of the base is encircled by a frieze of small arched niches, uniquely decorated with alternating muqarnas and grooved conch-shell motifs. The interior of the mausoleum consists of a single square chamber with a high mihrab niche on the west wall. The walls were originally decorated with high-quality Iranian glazed tiles from Kashan, featuring star and cross patterns in turquoise and lajvardina, similar to those excavated at the nearby Great Mosque of Qalhat.

Directly behind the main eastern portal, a flight of eight steps leads down to a subterranean crypt. Covered by a low barrel vault, the crypt measures 2.7 by 2.4 meters, large enough to house two graves.

In 2011, an artifact surfaced in an antique shop in Shiraz, Iran, which scholars identified as a 14th-century Ilkhanid stone-paste incense burner modeled exactly after the Bibi Maryam Mausoleum. The ceramic model accurately shows the asymmetrical facades, the specific placement of the niches, and the drum. Crucially, the dome and drum of the model feature a cobalt blue inscription that confirms the identity of the tomb:

- On the dome: "Remember Maryam in the Book. She left her family and went to a place in the Orient" (Quran, Surat Maryam, verse 16).
- On the drum: "Qalhat, Allah protected her from misfortunes."

== Conservation ==
Due to its coastal environment, the mausoleum has historically suffered from extreme saline weathering and structural decay. The Ministry of Heritage and Tourism of Oman carried out initial restorations in 2005–2007. In the 2010s, as part of the Qalhat Development Project, the World Monuments Fund and French archaeological teams conducted extensive stabilization, photogrammetry, and conservation of the mausoleum and its surrounding ruined complex. In 2018, the mausoleum, along with the ancient city of Qalhat, was inscribed as a UNESCO World Heritage Site.

== See also ==
- List of World Heritage Sites in Oman
- Bahla Fort
- List of World Heritage Sites in Arab states
