= Nabhani dynasty =

Royal house and ruling dynasty of Oman from 1154 to 1624

Nabhani dynasty آل نبهان Bani Nabhan
- Royal house
- Parent house: Azd; Banu Nabhan
- Country: Oman (historical)
- Founded: 1154; 872 years ago
- Founder: Muhammed al-Fallah
- Final ruler: Suleiman bin Mudhafar
- Titles: Malik (King of Oman); Sultan of Sohar; Tamimah of Banu Riyam
- Connected families: Yaruba dynasty
- Dissolution: 1624
- Cadet branches: Nabhanis of Jebel Akhdar

The House of Al-Nabhan (Arabic: آل نبهان, romanized: Āl Nabhān), also known as the Nabhani dynasty or Nabhanids, (Note: Members of the Banu Nabhan family were historically referred to as the Sultans of Sohar or Muluk (Kings) of Oman.) is an Arab royal house that ruled Oman as hereditary kings (muluk) from 1154 until 1624, when the Yaruba dynasty took power. (Note: The Ya'aruba were a branch of the Bani Nabhan. See Ibn Ruzaiq "Alfat-h", p. 261; Ibn Adeem's poem النونية; and Al-Siyabi "Al-Is'af", p. 116.) Descending from the Azdi tribe, the family established a centralized state apparatus across their territorial domains, reducing the traditional Ibadi elected imams to a largely symbolic religious role for nearly five centuries. The primary seat of power for the Nabhani kings fluctuated between the fortified interior capitals of Nizwa, Bahla, and Maqniyat, from which they controlled the lucrative overland frankincense and spice trade routes. One of their most enduring architectural and cultural legacies is the Bahla Fort, a massive complex of mud-brick buildings on stone foundations built between the 12th and 15th centuries, which was inscribed as a UNESCO World Heritage Site in 1987.

After the fall of the dynasty in 1624 and the end of the Nabhani monarchy, the family ceased to exist as a sovereign state institution. However, collateral branches continued to exercise local power in the interior as tamimahs (paramount tribal chiefs) of the Banu Riyam tribe and hereditary princes of Jebel Akhdar, until the Jebel Akhdar War in 1956.

== Background ==
After the early days of Islam, the tribes in the interior of Oman were led by Imams, who held both spiritual and temporal power. The Yahmad branch of Azd tribes gained power in the 9th century. They established a system where the ulama of the Banu Sama, the largest of the Nizari tribes of the interior, would select the Imam. The authority of the Imams declined due to power struggles. During the 11th and 12th centuries Oman was controlled by the Seljuk Empire. They were expelled in 1154, when the Nabhani dynasty came to power.

== Rule ==
Bani Nabhan were one of the Arab tribes of the interior with an ascribed Azdi origin. After the collapse of the Makramid dynasty, the Buyids appointed the Bani Nabhan as the governors of Sohar. The Nabhanids retained their power under the transition to Seljuk rule, and emerged as sovereign rulers after the waning of the Seljuk state. They eventually came to control cities in the interior such as Nizwa and Rustaq, but these were won back by the Ibadi Imamate.

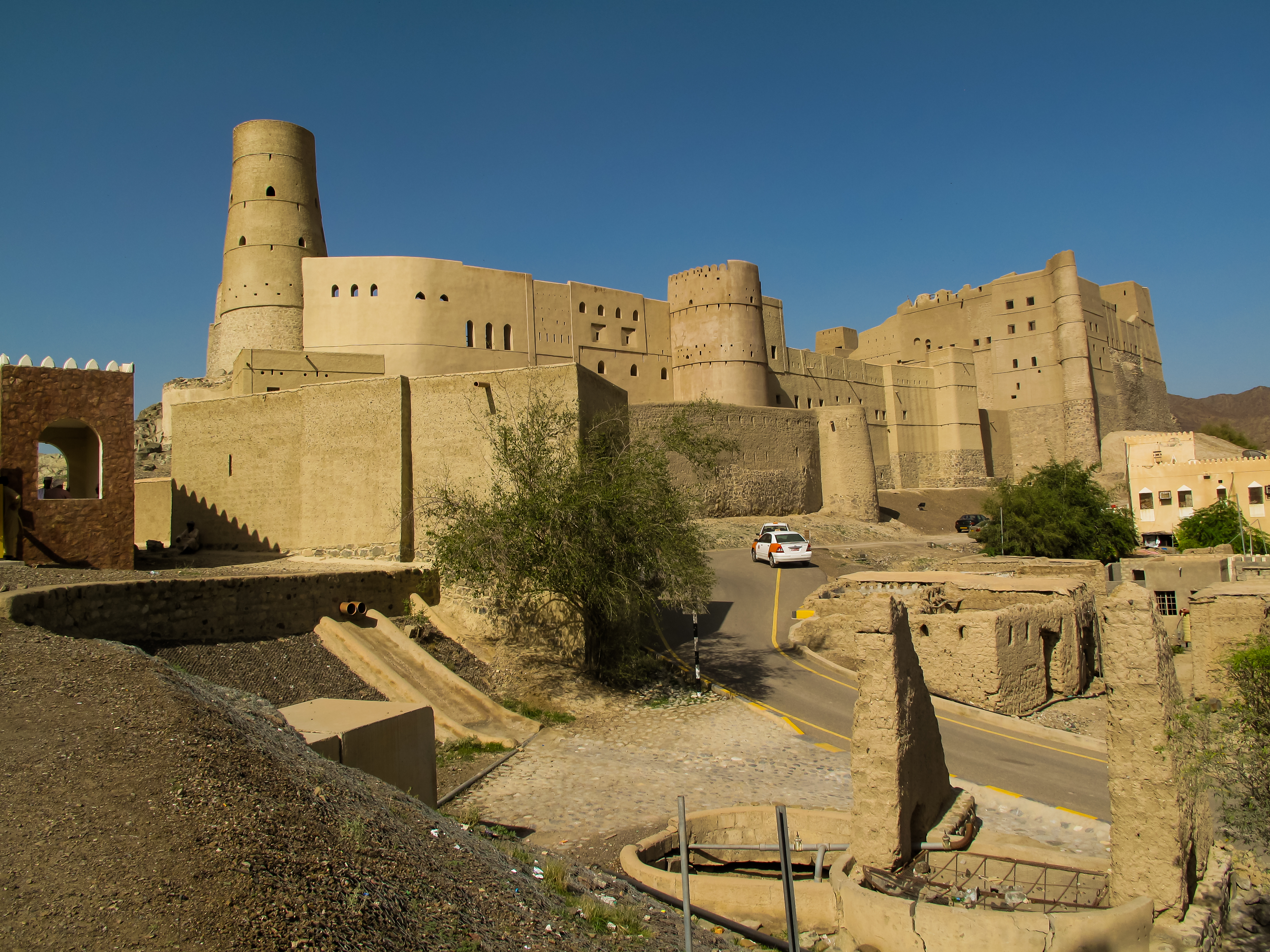
Bahla Fort in 2013 after major restoral work in the 1990s

The best quality frankincense, a valuable product in the Middle Ages, comes from Dhofar in the interior of southern Oman. The Banu Nabhan controlled the trade in frankincense on the overland route via Sohar to the Yabrin oasis, and then north to Bahrain, Baghdad and Damascus. Muhammed al-Fallah of the Banu Nabhan emerged as a powerful leader in 1151 and had taken control by 1154. He lived until 1176.

The Nabhans ruled as muluk, or kings, while the Imams were reduced to largely symbolic significance. The Imams lost moral authority since the title came to be treated as the property of the dominant tribe at any time. According to the historian Sirhan bin Said there were no records of Imams from 1153, when Imam Musa bin Abu Ja'afar died, until 1406, when Imam Hubaise bin Muhammad died.

The Nabhan came to make their capital at Bahla. The Bahla Fort is called Hisn Tammah, and is said to take its name from an Iranian ruler of the town before the Islamic period. The fort testifies to the power of the Nabhani in their heyday.

The period is poorly documented. It seems that at times the Nabhani only controlled part of the interior of the country, and at other times also ruled over the coastal lands. The Oman suffered from Persian invasions, and at one point the coast was controlled by the Kingdom of Hormuz. The Nabhan coordinated themselves politically with the Kingdom of Hormuz while they managed matters of the Omani interior. The Banu Nabhan were dominant over the other tribes until the end of the 15th century. There are records of personal visits by Nabhani rulers to Ethiopia, Zanzibar, the Lamu Archipelago of what is now Kenya, and Persia. The al-Nabhani dynasty of Pate Island in the Lamu Archipelago claimed descent from the Omani dynasty.

== Decline and fall ==
Oman had an elected Imam and a hereditary Nabhani sultan from the 15th century into the 17th century, with the Imams gaining the ascendancy. The Nabhani ruler Suleiman bin Mudhafar was removed by the Imam Muhammad ibn Ismail (1500–29). However, the Nabhanis clung to power in the Bahla region. In 1507 the Portuguese captured the coastal city of Muscat, and gradually extended their control along the coast up to Sohar in the north and down to Sur in the southeast. Omani histories record that the Bahla fort was destroyed in the early 17th century shortly before the Ya'Aruba dynasty took control of Oman, although it is possible that parts of the old structure remained and were used as the basis for later construction. In 1624 Nasir bin Murshid of the Ya'Aruba took over control of Oman.

== Later years ==
The Nabahina retained power at the beginning of the Ya'rubi state and they treated Jabal al-akhdar (The Green Mountains located in the interior of Oman) as an emirate. Thus, the Nabahinah transferred their loyalties from the Banu Rawahah to the Banu Riyam at the beginning of the seventeenth century. They became the tamimah of the Banu Riyam and princes of the Jabal al-Akhdar, and survived as such until they were defeated in the war of Jabal Akhdar in 1956. At the time the Sheikh of the Bani Riyam was Suleiman bin Himyar Al-Nabhani, Lord of the Jebel Akhdar-and descendant of the ancient Nabahina dynasty. After the war Suleiman bin Himyar fled to Saudi Arabia where he remained in exile until he returned to Oman on Thursday, 28 November 1996, where he lived his remaining days in Muscat until he died on Thursday, 7 May 1998 – most of his kin remain to this day living in Muscat the capital of Oman.

Although the Ya'Aruba ruled under the title of Imam, since they originated from the Nabahina kings dynasty they actually continued to rule as kings inheriting the title of Imam through vertical succession, thereby contradicting the Imamate tradition which provides that the Imam must be chosen from among the ahl al-hal wal ‘aqd transliterated as "those who loosen and bind". (This concept evolved during the period of the Khulafa ar-Rashidoon as a mechanism to choose the leader of the Muslims. The ahl al-hal wal ‘aqd are the leading personalities of society who are knowledgeable and have a proven track record of sincerity and sacrifice. They have no personal or class interests. The person who is appointed leader also does not covet such a position but is seen as most suitable for the job.)

== List of sultans ==
| Name | Portrait | Reign start | Reign end | Notes |
|---|---|---|---|---|
| Muhammed al-Fallah | | 1406 | 1435 | |
| Abul Hassan of Oman | | 1435 | 1451 | |
| Omar bin al Khattab | | 1451 | 1490 | |
| Omar al Sharif | | 1490 | 1500 | |
| Muhammad bin Ismail | | 1500 | 1529 | Portuguese protectorate imposed on 15 April 1515. |
| Barakat bin Muhammad | | 1529 | 1560 | |
| Abdulla bin Muhammad | | 1560 | 1624 | |

== Notes and references ==
Notes

Citations

Sources

- Al-Salimi, Abdulrahman (2002). "Different succession chronologies of the Nabhani dynasty in Oman". Proceedings of the Seminar for Arabian Studies. Vol. 32. ISBN 2503513360.
- "Bahla Fort". Unesco.
- Donzel, E. J. Van (1 January 1994). Islamic Desk Reference. BRILL. p. 202. ISBN 978-90-04-09738-4.
- Ghubash, Hussein (31 March 2006). Oman - The Islamic Democratic Tradition. Taylor & Francis. ISBN 978-0-203-09970-4.
- Laet, Sigfried J. de (2000). "Arab-Muslim Cultures and Local Cultures on the East Coast of Africa and the Indian Ocean Islands". History of Humanity: From the seventh to the sixteenth century. UNESCO. ISBN 978-92-3-102813-7.
- Limbert, Mandana (7 June 2010). In the Time of Oil: Piety, Memory, and Social Life in an Omani Town. Stanford University Press. ISBN 978-0-8047-5626-6.
- Nabhan, Gary Paul (2008). Arab/American: Landscape, Culture, and Cuisine in Two Great Deserts. University of Arizona Press. ISBN 978-0-8165-2658-1.
- Nowell, Simone (11 January 2011). Oman - Culture Smart!: The Essential Guide to Customs & Culture. Kuperard. ISBN 978-1-85733-622-1.
- Oxford Business Group (2007). The Report: Oman 2007. Oxford Business Group. ISBN 978-1-902339-62-7.
- Rabi, Uzi (2011). Emergence of States in a Tribal Society: Oman Under Sa'Id Bin Taymur, 1932-1970. Apollo Books. ISBN 978-1-84519-473-4.
- Smiley, David; Kemp, Peter (1975). Arabian Assignment. London: Cooper. ISBN 978-0850521818.
- Thomas, Gavin (1 November 2011). The Rough Guide to Oman. Penguin. ISBN 978-1-4053-8935-8.
- Wilkinson, John (1977). Water and Tribal Settlement in South East Arabia - A Study of the Aflaj of Oman. Oxford. ISBN 978-0198232179.
