= Portuguese intervention in Hormuz (1514–1515) =

1514–1515 military intervention

- Part of Portuguese conquest of Hormuz
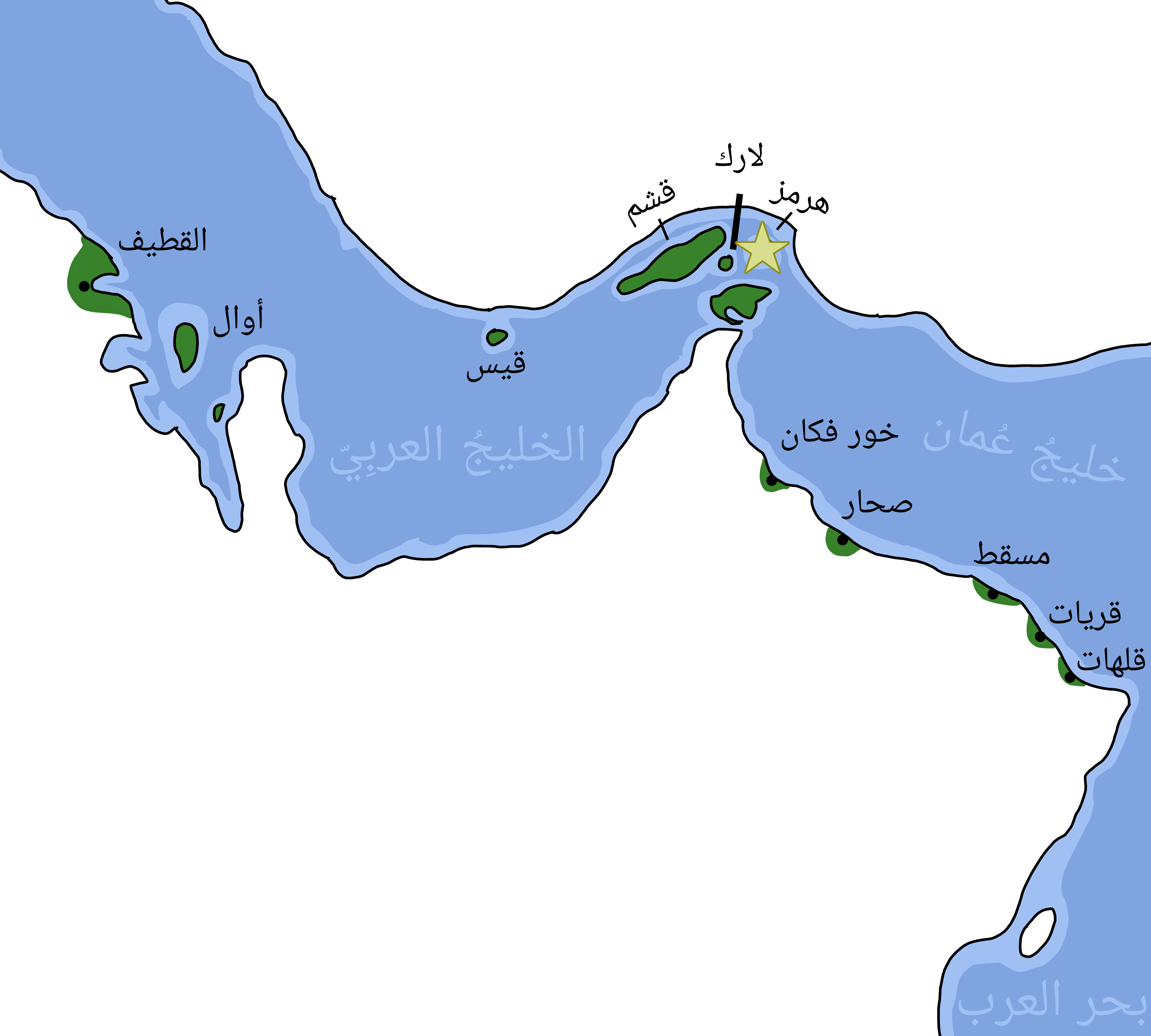
- Map of Kingdom of Hormuz
Date	1514–1515
Location	Hormuz, Persian Gulf
Result	Portuguese–Turah Shah victory
Territorial changes	Hormuz becomes a vassal of Portugal

Belligerents
(Portuguese Empire) Kingdom of Portugal: Kingdom of Hormuz; Loyal to Turan Shah IV	Kingdom of Hormuz; Loyal to Rais Ahmad; Supported by: Safavid Empire

Commanders and leaders
(Portuguese Empire) Pêro de Albuquerque (Portuguese Empire) Afonso de Albuquerque; Turan Shah IV	Rais Ahmad †; Supported by: (Safavid Iran) Ismail I

Strength
27 ships 3,000 men	Unknown

Casualties and losses
Unknown	Unknown

The Portuguese intervention in Hormuz (1514–1515) took place amidst a power struggle within the Kingdom of Hormuz. After the poisoning of King Saif-ud-Din in 1512, Hormuz was divided between Turan Shah and Rais Ahmad, who held control with the support of Ismail I of Persia. The Portuguese, led by Afonso de Albuquerque, intervened, eventually assassinating Rais Ahmad and establishing Portuguese control over Hormuz.

== Background ==
In the early 1500s, Hormuz was under the rule of King Saif-ud-Din. However, King Saif-ud-Din was poisoned in 1512 by Rais Nur-ud-Din, who then installed the young Turan Shah as the new king. But Turan Shah's rule was short, as Rais Ahmad, the son of Rais Nur-ud-Din, deposed his uncle and took control of the kingdom, with the backing of Ismail Shah of Persia.

== Conflict ==
In response to the growing influence of the Safavids in Hormuz, Afonso de Albuquerque sent his nephew, Pêro de Albuquerque, to the island in 1514. Pêro's mission was to collect overdue tribute, explore the political landscape, and reinforce Portuguese control. However, his mission did not achieve its objectives.

On February 21, 1515, Afonso de Albuquerque personally sailed to Hormuz with a fleet of 27 ships and 3,000 men. Upon arrival, Albuquerque found the city fortified but politically divided. King Turan Shah and Rais Nur-ud-Din sought Portuguese help to remove Rais Ahmad, believing that Portugal was only interested in trade and tribute.

On April 1, 1515, Albuquerque landed his forces with Turan Shah's consent. Using the alliance with Turan Shah, Albuquerque organized the assassination of Rais Ahmad during a council meeting. This action terrified Turan Shah, who then became the king, but as a Portuguese vassal.

== Aftermath ==
To solidify their control, the Portuguese began constructing a fort in Hormuz on May 3, 1515. The campaign, however, was taxing on Portuguese troops due to the intense heat and diseases.

After its vassalage, Hormuz remained under Portuguese control until 1622, when it was recaptured by Persian and English forces.

== Bibliography ==
- Potter, L. (January 5, 2009). The Persian Gulf in History. Springer. ISBN 978-0230618459.
- Khan, Abdul (May 31, 2023). European Imperialism and the Third World. Taylor & Francis. ISBN 978-1000878042.
- Sanceau, Elaine (1936). Indies adventure; the amazing career of Afonso de Albuquerque, captain-general and governor of India (1509-1515). London Glasgow : Blackie & son.
