= Qalhat =

Qalhāt Arabic: قلهات
- Village
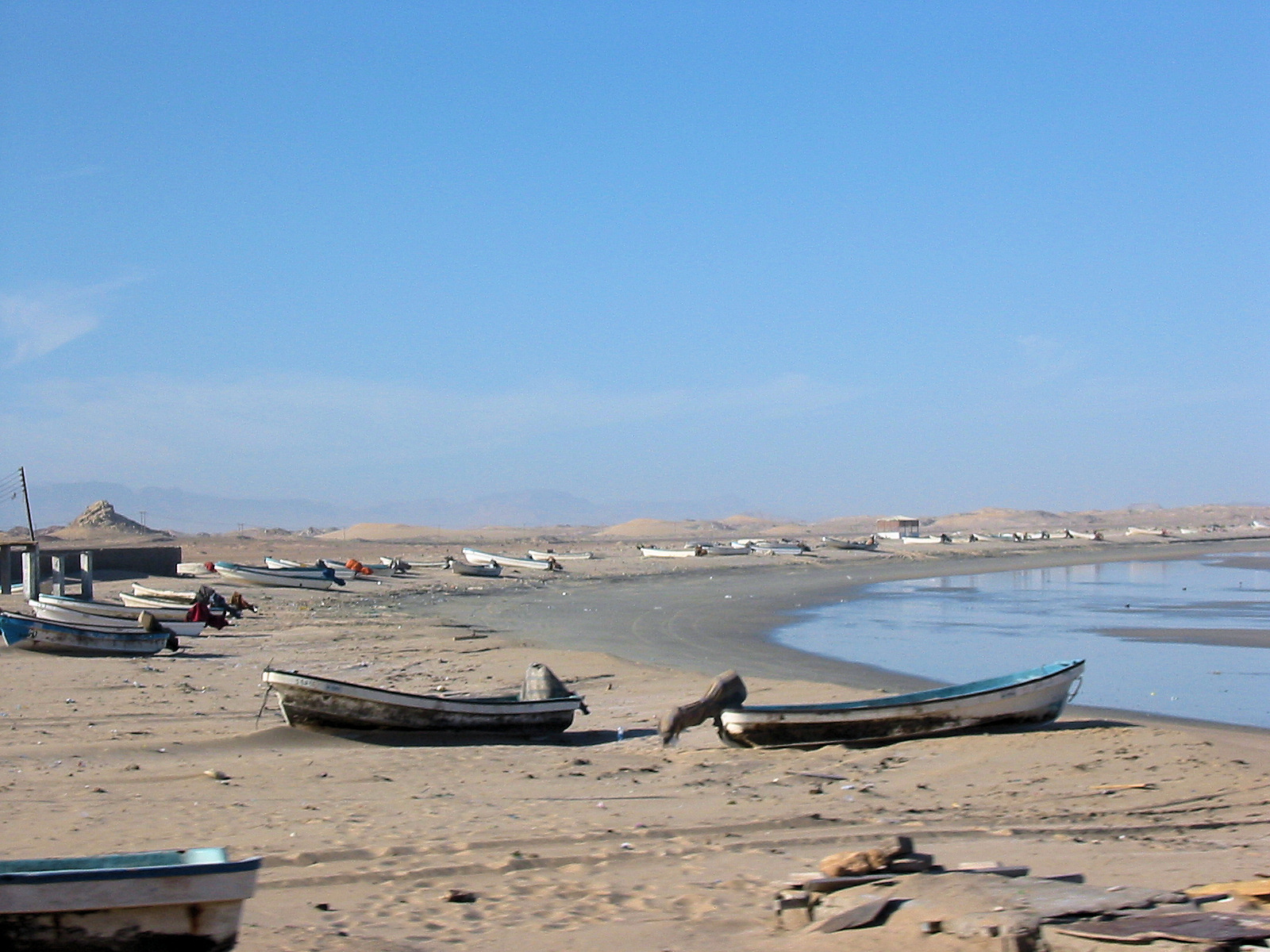
- Interactive map of Qalhāt
- Coordinates: 22°41′58″N 59°22′10″E
- Country: Oman
- Governorate: Ash Sharqiyah South Governorate
- Wilayat: Wilayat of Sur

Population (2010)
  - Total: 1,123

Ancient City of Qalhat
UNESCO World Heritage Site
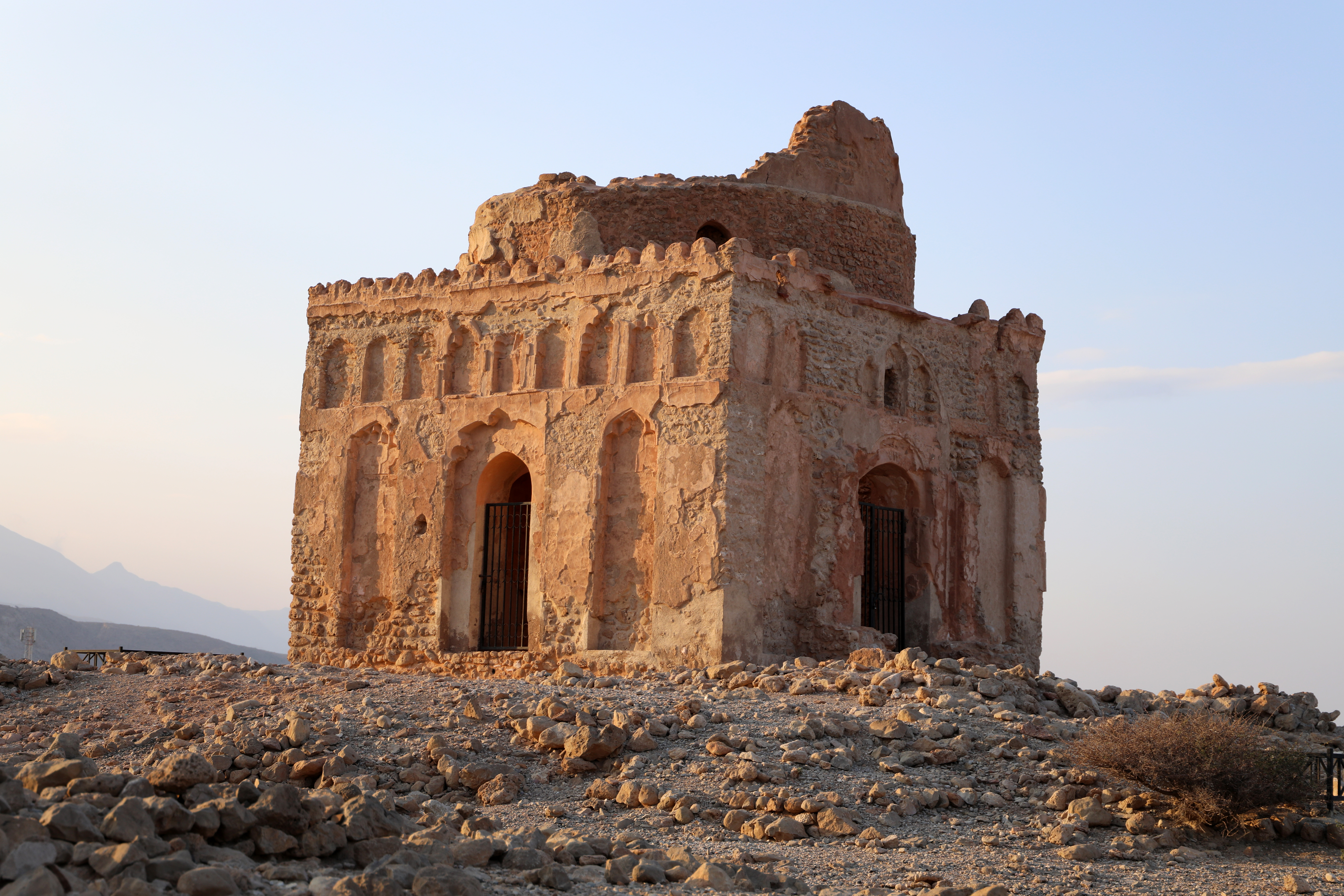
- Bibi Maryam mausoleum

- Location within Oman Location within West and Central Asia
- Location: Sur Province, Ash Sharqiyah South Governorate, Oman
- Criteria: Cultural: (ii), (iii)
- Reference: 1537
- Inscription: 2018 (42nd Session)
- Area: 75.82 ha (187.4 acres)
- Buffer zone: 170.09 ha (420.3 acres)
- Coordinates: 22°42′N 59°22′E

Qalhāt (Arabic: قلهات) is a village in Oman, over 20 km north of Sur. The residential area is to the northwest of Wādī Ḥilm (Arabic: وادي حلم), and the ruins of the ancient city are located to the southeast. The ancient city is referred to as Calatu by Marco Polo and as Calha in the map of Abraham Ortelius.

== Site description ==
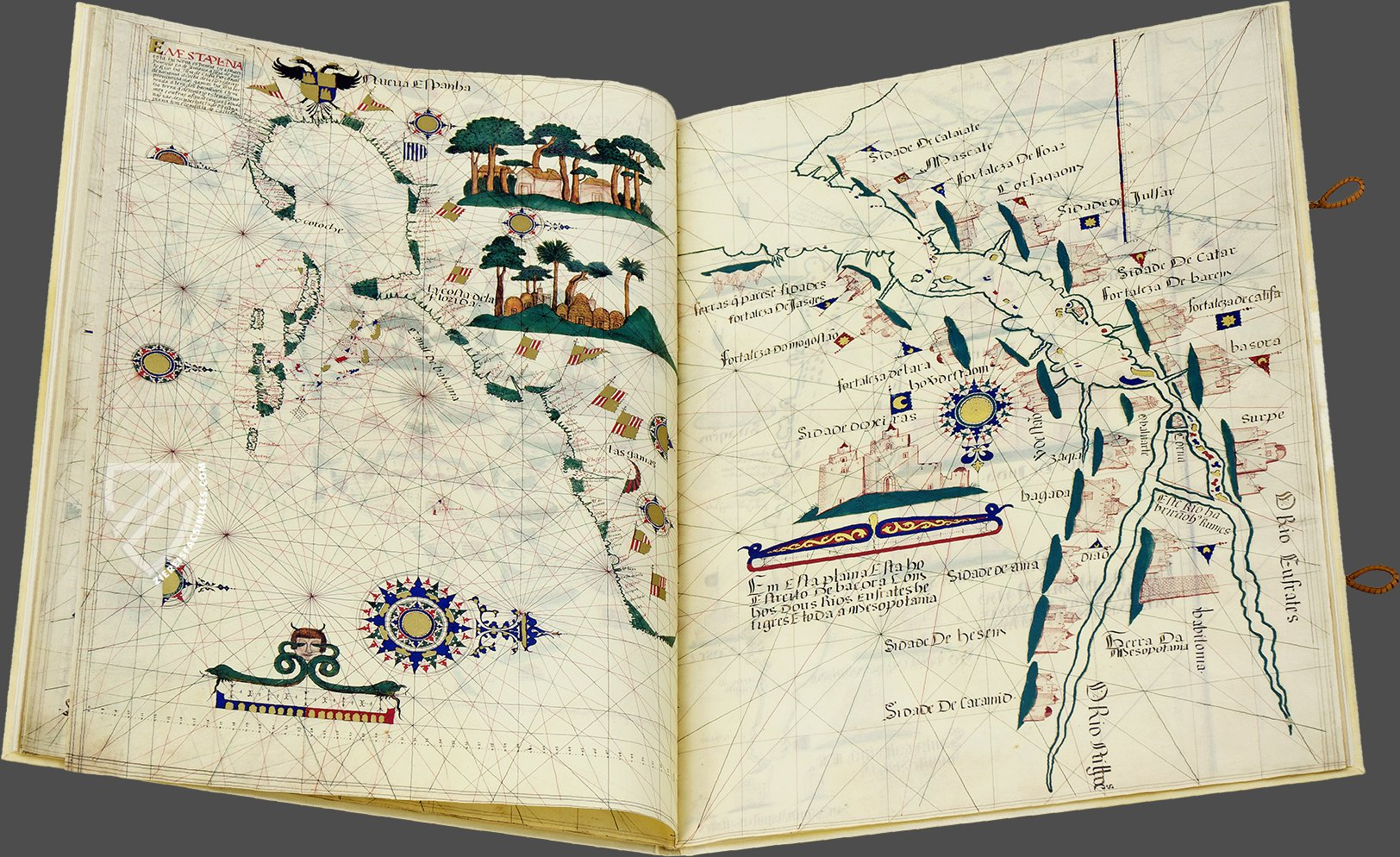
Sidade de Calaiate depicted in Lázaro Luís' 1563 map of Arabia

Marco Polo visited Qalhat in the 13th century, referring to it as Calatu. Ibn Battuta visited the city in the 14th century, noting that it had "fine bazaars and one of the most beautiful mosques." He further noted the mosque was built by Bibi Maryam and included walls of qashani. Bibi Maryam continued to rule Qalhat and Hurmuz after the death of her husband Ayaz in 1311 or 1312. Zheng He visited the city in the 15th century, and his crew called it 加剌哈 (Taihu Wu: ka-la-ha; Hokkien: ka-lat-ha; Cantonese: gaa-laat-haa).

Qalhat served as an important stop in the wider Indian Ocean trade network, and was also the second city of the Kingdom of Ormus. By 1507 when it was captured by Afonso de Albuquerque on behalf of the Portuguese Empire, the city was already in decline as trade shifted to Muscat. Covering more than 60 acres (240,000 m^{2}), Qalhat was surrounded by fortified walls that contained houses and shops. Very little remains of the ancient city, save for the now dome-less mausoleum of Bibi Maryam. Artifacts from as far away as Persia and China were found on-site.

Recently, a research conducted by geoarchaeologists of the University of Bonn conclude that earthquake activity along the most prominent structural element, the Qalhat Fault, is a plausible reason for the decline of the medieval city.

== World Heritage Site ==
This site was added to the UNESCO World Heritage Tentative List on July 4, 1988 in the Cultural category. The ancient city became a World Heritage Site in 2018.

== Qalhat LNG Terminal ==
The Oman LNG LLC S.A.O.C. owned Qalhat LNG Terminal is situated at the Port of Qalhat.
