= Qalhat LNG Terminal =

Port in Ash Sharqiyah Region of Oman

- Interactive map of Qalhat LNG Terminal
- Location within Oman

Location
- Country: Oman
- Location: Qalhat, Sur, Ash Sharqiyah Region
- Coordinates: 22°39′40″N 59°24′19″E

Details
- Owned by: Oman LNG LLC
- Type of Harbor: Pier, Jetty or Wharf

Statistics
- Website www.omanlng.com

Qalhat LNG Terminal, also known as Port of Qalhat, is situated in Ash Sharqiyah Region of Oman near Sur.

This port is owned by Oman LNG LLC S.A.O.C.. Osaka Gas has a 3% equity interests in Qalhat LNG along with Itochu Corporation and Mitsubishi Corporation. These three Japanese companies have a 9% stake in total and have entered into multi-year LNG supply agreements with Oman. The other shareholders in Qalhat LNG are the Oman Government (46.84%), Oman LNG (36.8%) and Spanish utility Unión Fenosa Gas (7.36%).
