= Soumyen Bandyopadhyay =

Indian architectural historian

- Born: Kolkata, India
- Occupations: Architect, architectural historian
- Known for: Architectural history of Oman and South Asia
- Spouse: Jagori Banerjee
- Children: 2

Academic background
- Education: University of Liverpool; University of Calcutta
- Doctoral advisor: Simon Pepper

Academic work
- Discipline: History of architecture Architecture

Soumyen Bandyopadhyay is an architect and architectural historian at Liverpool University He has worked at the Manchester School of Architecture and Nottingham Trent University.

== Education ==
Bandyopadhyay earned his PhD from the University of Liverpool in 1998, research was on Manah: Architecture, Archaeology and Social Structure of a Deserted Omani Settlement

== Career ==
He currently holds the Sir James Stirling Chair and is head of the Liverpool School of Architecture. He has previously held professorial positions at Manchester School of Architecture and Nottingham Trent University.

With other associates Giamila Quattrone, Martin Goffriller and Mohammad Habib Reza, Bandyopadhyay founded the ArCHIAM (Centre for the Study of Architecture and Cultural Heritage of India, Arabia and the Maghreb) interdisciplinary research centre based at the University of Liverpool in 2013.

== Roles ==
- External Examiner, MA (Thinking Building), University of Kingston
- Advisor, Conservation and Interpretation of Qasr Al Husn Palace, Abu Dhabi. Government of Abu Dhabi (with Austin Smith Lord, UK)
- Director, India in the World Research Centre (IWRC), University of Liverpool
- External Examiner, Graduate Diploma in Architecture, University of Kingston
- External Assessor, Bachelor of Architecture Programme, University of Lincoln
- Advisor and contributor, Muscat Urban Renewal, Muscat Municipality and The Palace Office, Government of the Sultanate of Oman
- Advisor, Ceremonial Route, The Palace Office, Government of the Sultanate of Oman
- Advisor and contributor, Development and Conservation of Harat al Aqr (Nizwa), Ministry of Regional Municipalities, Government of the Sultanate of Oman
- Advisor and contributor, Management Plan for Bahla Fort and Oasis World Heritage Site (UNESCO inscription 1987 C-iv), UNESCO and Ministry of Heritage and Culture, Government of the Sultanate of Oman
- Advisor and contributor, Conservation of the National Heritage Site of Harat al Bilad (Manah), Ministry of Heritage and Culture, Government of the Sultanate of Oman
- Member of review panel, Global Built Environment Review (GBER)
- Member of review panel, International Development Planning Review (IDPR)
- Listed as an expert on Omani traditional architecture and settlements, International Oman Studies Centre, Germany
- Visiting Design Critic in graduate and undergraduate design program. Institutions include, Nottingham University, Kingston University, Manchester Metropolitan University, Leeds Metropolitan University, University of Washington: Seattle
- Member of review panel, Hong Kong Papers in Design and Development (University of Hong Kong)
- Invited Member, Projects Committee, Merseyside Civic Society, Liverpool

== Publications ==
=== Books ===
- Bandyopadhyay, Soumyen (2010). Manah: Omani Oasis, Arabian Legacy Architecture and Social History of an Omani Oasis Settlement. Liverpool University Press. ISBN 978-1-84631-121-5.
- Bandyopadhyay, S & Temple, N (2009) Arresting Architecture: Bridging Research and Academic Design. Liverpool University Press, Liverpool
- Bandyopadhyay S & Jackson, I (2009) Nek Chand's Rock Garden. Phaidon/ MIT, London
- Bandyopadhyay, Soumyen (2008) Omani Mihrab-s: Origin and Evolution. Ministry of Awqaf and Religious Affairs, Muscat
- Bandyopadhyay, Soumyen (2008) Manah: The Architecture of an Omani Settlement. Historical Association of Oman, Muscat
- Soumyen, Bandyopadhyay; Jackson, Iain (2007). The collection, the ruin and the theatre: architecture, sculpture and landscape in Nek Chand's Rock Garden, Chandigarh. Liverpool University Press. ISBN 978-1-84631-120-8.
- Bandyopadhyay, Soumyen (2001) Manah: A Gift of God, The Architecture of a Deserted Omani Settlement. Historical Association of Oman., Muscat

=== Book chapters ===
- Bandyopadhyay, S., TEMPLE, N., LOMHOLT, J. and TOBE, R., 2010. [Introduction]. In: Bandyopadhyay, S., Temple, N., Lomholt, J. and Tobe, R., eds., The humanities in architectural design. London : Routledge, pp. xiv–xxi.
- Bandyopadhyay, S., 2008. From another world! A possible Buyid origin of the decorated 'Mihrab' of central Oman? In: Olijdam, E., ed. Intercultural relations between South and Southeast Asia, studies in commemoration of E.C.L. during Caspers (1934–1966). Oxford : Archaeopress vol. 1826, pp. 372–382.
- Bandyopadhyay, S., 2007. The foreigner, situated moments and topographic healing. In: Bandyopadhyay, S. and Temple, N., eds., Reflections on architectural research and building work. London : Black Dog Publishing, pp. 58–75.
- Bandyopadhyay, S., 2007. [Conclusion]. In: Bandyopadhyay, S. and Temple, N., eds., Reflections on architectural research and building work. London : Black Dog Publishing, pp. 184–186.
- Bandyopadhyay, S., 2007. [Introduction]. In: Bandyopadhyay, S. and Temple, N., eds., Reflections on architectural research and building work. London : Black Dog Publishing, pp. 4–13.
- Bandyopadhyay, S., 2006. Interpretation of heritage sites and assessing cultural significance: the enclosed 'Zara' of Harat al-Bilad (Manah Oasis). Conservation of earthen structures in the Arab states. Grenoble : UNESCO World Heritage Centre; CRATerreENSAG., pp. 75–87.
- Bandyopadhyay, S. and TEMPLE, N., 2006. Contemplating the unfinished: architectural drawing and the fabricated ruin. In: Frascari, M., ed. From models to drawings: imagination and representation in architecture. London : Taylor & Francis/ Routledge, pp. 109–119.
- Bandyopadhyay, S., 2005. Problematic aspect of synthesis and interpretation in the study of traditional Omani built environment. In: Shakur, T., ed. Cities in transition: transforming the global built environment. Altrincham : Open House Press, pp. 15–30.
- Bandyopadhyay, S., 2005. Diversity in unity: an analysis of settlement structure of Harat al-'Aqr, Nizwa (Oman). Proceedings of the seminar for Arabian studies. vol. 35, pp. 19–36.
- Bandyopadhyay, S., 2005. The deconstructed courtyard: dwellings of Central Oman. In: Edwards, B., ed. Courtyard housing: past, present and future. Abingdon; New York : Taylor & Francis, pp. 109–121.
- Bandyopadhyay, S., 2004. Harat al-Bilad (Manah): glimpses of a complexity of ideas and concepts. In: Al, Taie, H., ed. Pride. Muscat : Al Roya, pp. 54–58.
- Bandyopadhyay, S. and SIBLEY, M., 2003. The distinctive typology of central Omani mosques: its nature and antecedents. Proceedings of the seminar for Arabian studies. vol. 33, pp. 99–116.
- Bandyopadhyay, S., AHMED, Y. and YEOMANS, D., 2002. Conservation of world heritage cities in Asia and the Pacific: the changing scope of heritage since the Venice Charter 1964. 2nd Post-Graduate Conference Proceedings. University of Salford.
- Bandyopadhyay, S., KNIGHT, M., BERRIDGE, P. and BROWN, A., 2001. Digital hindcasting: critical analysis through virtual reconstruction. eCAADe19: architectural information management., pp. 529–533.
- Bandyopadhyay, S., 2001. Deserted and disregarded: the architecture of Bilad Manah in central Oman. Archéologie Islamique. vol. 10, pp. 131–168.
- Bandyopadhyay, S., 2000. Manah: the deserted enchantress. In: Al, Zakhwani, S., ed. Tribute. Muscat : Apex, pp. 161–176.
- Bandyopadhyay, S., 2000. From the twilight of cultural memory: the 'Bumah' in the mosques of central Oman. Proceedings of the seminar for Arabian studies. vol. 30, pp. 13–25.
- Bandyopadhyay, S., 1998. Iconography, ideogram and the 'Intentio Auctoris': the recent work of Charles Correa. Invocations of tradition in pedagogy. Berkeley : University of California Press vol. 113, pp. 17–42.
- Bandyopadhyay, S., 1996. Representation of the cultural palimpsest: the case of Manah in Oman, with special reference to the relationship of water to the places of worship. Multiple voices/contested representations: imagery and identity. Berkeley : University of California Press vol. 83, pp. 1–38.
- Bandyopadhyay, S., 1994. Affordability: some recent findings from the Indian scene. Proceedings of the second symposium on housing for the urban poor: housing, poverty and developing countries. European Network on Housing Research (ENHR).
- Bandyopadhyay, S., 1994. The deserted village of Manah: an Ibadi-Omani settlement: a brief description of settlement pattern and dwellings. In: Cockburn, C., ed. Architecture and planning in the developing world. University of York, pp. 37–43.
- Bandyopadhyay, S., 1994. Settlement planning and housing in modern Oman: a climatologically appropriate solution? Buildings and the environment. Watford; Rotterdam : Central Institute of Building (CIB), Nederland & Building Research Establishment (BRE). vol. EP10
- Bandyopadhyay, S., 1993. Housing and modern built environment in Oman. In: Elgohary, A., ed. Proceedings of the 10th inter-schools conference on development. University College London, pp. 43–54.
- Bandyopadhyay, S., 1992. Housing and settlement development in present-day Oman: energy issues and comfort conditions. Proceedings of the 20th IAHS world congress on housing. Birmingham; Miami : International Association of Housing Science (IAHS) vol. 2, pp. 1–18.
- Bandyopadhyay, S., 1992. Rethinking progress: the case of Oman, an investigation into its built environment. Housing, squatter communities and tradition. Berkeley : University of California Press vol. 51, pp. 1–38.
