= Kingdom of Hormuz =

Kingdom in the Persian Gulf (11th century – 1622)

Kingdom of Hormuz هرمز
- 11th century – 1622
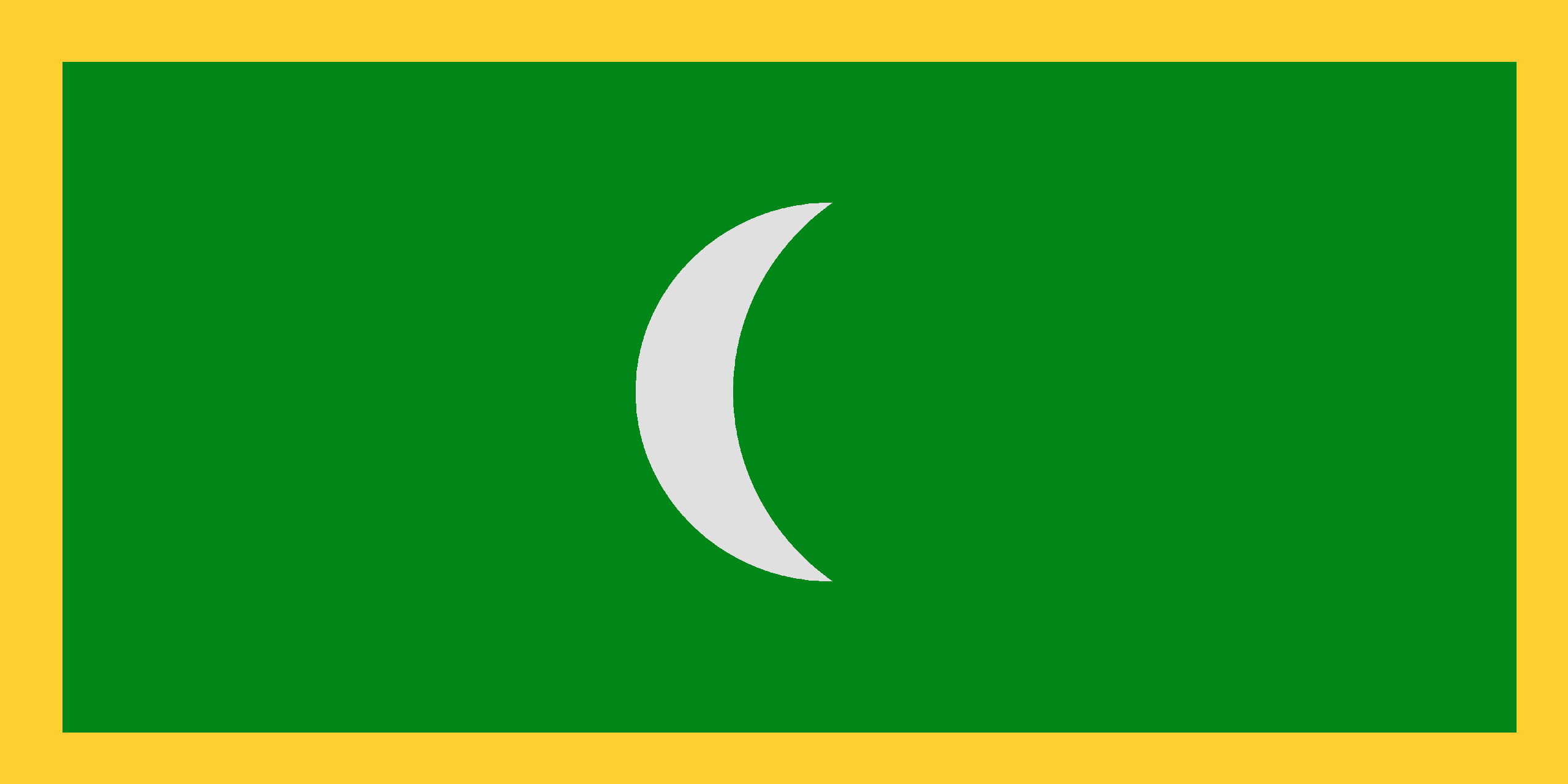
- Flag according to Rui Freire de Andrade

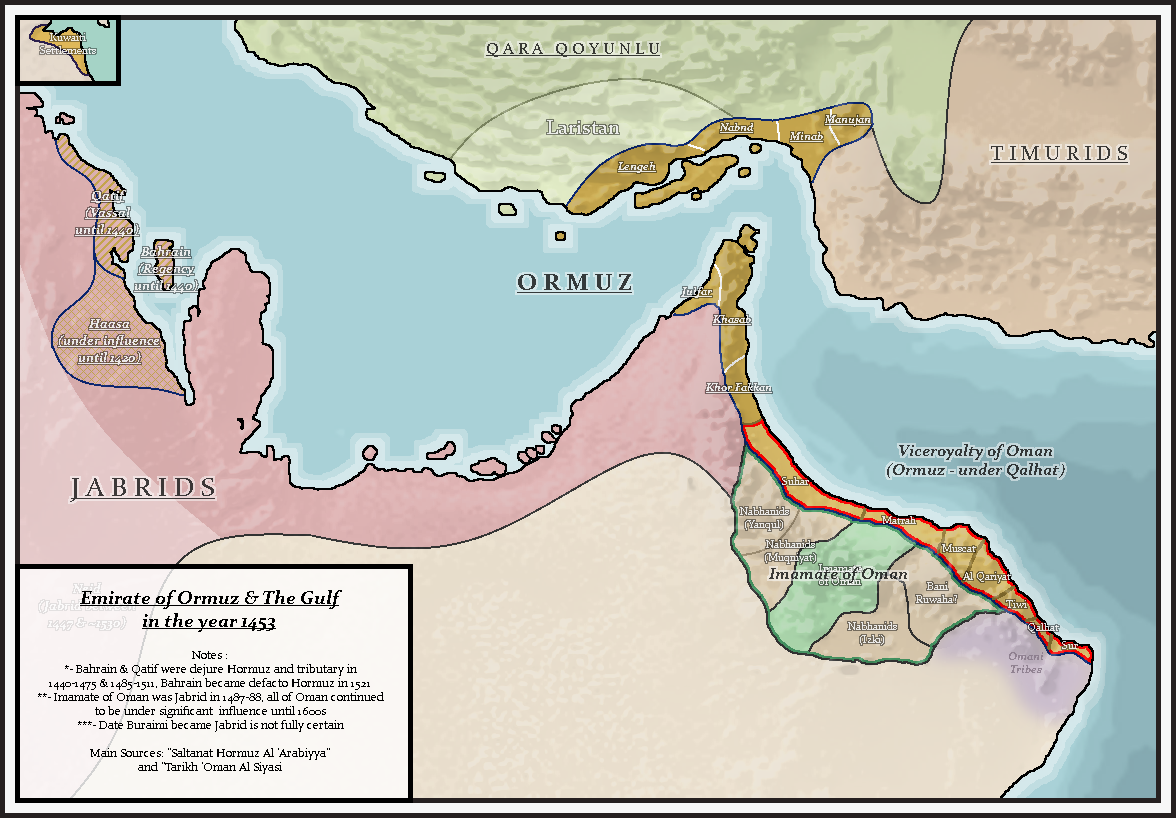
- Area of control of Hormuz in the 15th century
- Status: Vassal state of Portugal (1515–1622)
- Capital: Hormuz; 27°06′N 56°27′E
- Common languages: Persian, Arabic, Portuguese
- Religion: Sunni Islam (official); Twelver Islam (minority)
- Government: Kingdom
- King
- History
  - Established: 11th century
  - Safavid conquest: 1622
Succeeded by
Safavid Iran

The Kingdom of Hormuz (also known as Hormoz or, archaically, Ormus; Persian: هرمز; Portuguese and Spanish: Ormuz) was a kingdom ruled by a dynasty of southern Arab origin. It was located in the eastern side of the Persian Gulf and extended as far as Bahrain in the west at its zenith. The Kingdom was established in the 11th century initially as a dependency of the Kerman Seljuk Sultanate, and later as an autonomous tributary of the Salghurid Turkmens and the Ilkhanate. In its last phase Hormuz became a client state of the Portuguese Empire in the East.

Hormuz, the island for which the Kingdom was named, was a major base of economic exchanges and marine trade as an important port between the Persian Gulf and the Indian Ocean. This port was originally located on the southern coast of Iran to the east of the Strait of Hormuz, near the modern city of Minab, and was later relocated to the island of Jarun, which came to be known as Hormuz Island, which is located near the modern city of Bandar Abbas.

== Etymology ==
The origins of the name of Hormuz are vague. One theory is the name derives from the local Persian language word Hur-Mogh هورمغ 'Place of Dates', while another theory suggests "Hormuz" from the Middle Persian pronunciation of the name of the Zoroastrian god هرمز Hormoz (Ahura Mazda). Some sources suggest the former is more likely, while others lean towards the latter. Another theory claims that the strait of Hormuz may have been named after Ifra Hormizd, the mother of King Shapur II of Persia, who ruled between 309 and 379 AD. Yet another theory is that it comes from ὅρμος hormos, the Greek word for 'cove, bay'.

The name of the urban settlement that acted as the capital of the Old Hormoz Kingdom was also given as Naband (Persian: نابند).

== History ==
=== Old Hormuz ===
The earliest period of the history of the kings of Hormuz starts with the emigration of Muhammad Diramku from Oman to the Iranian coast in the 11th century and lasted until the transfer of the capital to Hormuz island at the turn of the 14th century. During this period Hormuz enjoyed a long period of autonomy under the suzerainty of kings of Iran from the foundation of the kingdom in the 11th century to the coming of the Portuguese. Notable events of this period include power struggles between the numerous emirs of Hormuz and the surrounding region and the sustaining of the economic status of Hormuz.

Hormuz was ruled by the descendants of Muhammad Diramku (Deramkub "Dirham minter") who founded the kingdom as a dependency of the Kingdom of Kerman after the collapse of the Buyid kingdom, reaching its apogee under the rule of the Mongol dynasty of the Ilkhanids. In the medieval period, the kingdom was well known as an international emporium controlling both sides of the Persian Gulf and much of the coastal area of the Arabian Sea.

"It was during the reign of Mir Bahrudin Ayaz Seyfin, fifteenth king of Hormoz, that the Seljuks raided Kerman and from there to Hormuz. The wealth of Hormuz attracted raids so often that the inhabitants sought refuge off the mainland and initially moved to the island of Qeshm. Mir Bahrudin then visited the island of Jerun and obtained it from Neyn (Na'im), King of Keys (Kish), to whom all the islands in the area belonged. After undertaking the Hajj pilgrimage, Mir Bahrudin became widely known as Haji Bahrudin in the lands of Hormuz."

These shifts in power marked the end of the [Persian] Gulf's heyday, but the island ports of Qays and then the mainland port of Hormoz (at first tributary to Persia) became renowned entrepôts. The Hurmuzî rulers developed Qalhat on the Omani coast in order to control both sides of the entrance to the Persian Gulf. Later, in 1300, the Hurmuzî merchants cast off Persian overlordship, and reorganized their entrepot on the island also called Hurmuz and there amassed legendary wealth. The relationship between the Nabâhina and the Hurmuzîs is obscure".

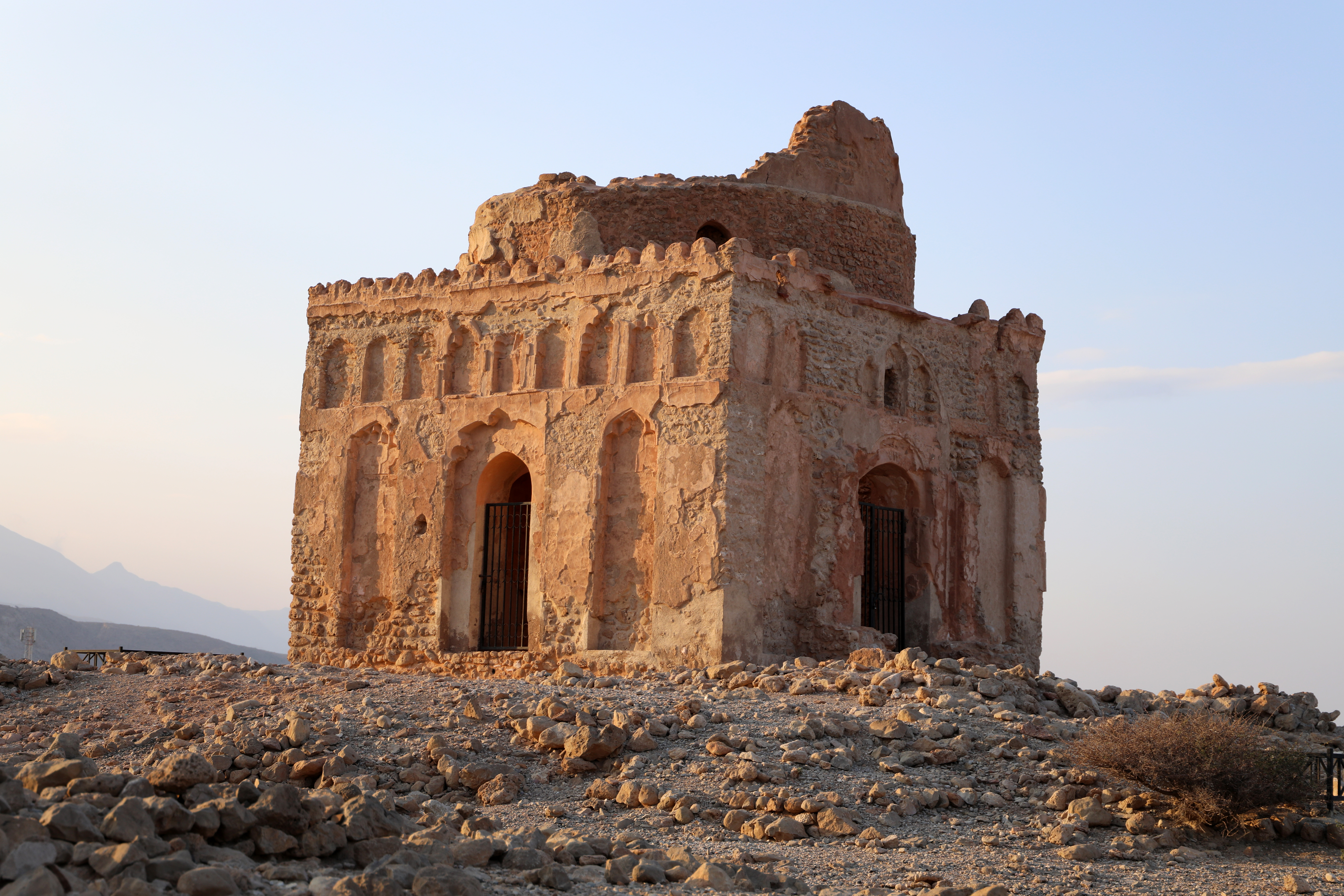
Bibi Maryam mausoleum

=== New Hormuz ===
The start of the reign of Emir Rukn Al-Din Mahmud Qalhati (r. 1249–1286) saw the beginning of a new period in the history of Hormuz. This period was generally characterised as seeing Hormuz cutting dependence ties with Kerman and the Salghurids (located in Fars) and instead projecting power to the direction of Bahrain and Oman.

At the time of the Ilkhanid competition with the Chaghatais, the old city of Hormuz, also known as Nabands and Dewankhana, was abandoned by its inhabitants. Instead, in 1301, the inhabitants, led by the king Baha ud-Din Ayaz and his wife Bibi Maryam, moved to the neighbouring island of Jerun.

In the early 15th century, Hormuz was one the kingdoms that was visited by the Chinese expeditionary fleet commanded by Admiral Zheng He during the Ming treasure voyages and was the final destination of the fleet during the fourth voyage. Ma Huan, an interpreter serving in the crew, described Hormuz society in a positive light in the Yingya Shenglan, writing for example about the people that "the limbs and faces of the people are refined and fair [...] and they are stalwart and fine-looking; their clothing and hats are handsome, distinctive and elegant." Fei Xin, another crew member, made an account of Hormuz in the Xingcha Shenglan. It included, for instance, observations suggesting that Hormuz society had a high standard of living, writing that "the lower classes are wealthy", and on local dressing habits such as the long robes worn by both men and women, the veils that women wore over their head and face when going out, and the jewels worn by the well-to-do.

Being known as an international emporium and well known in Europe as a commercial hub, its success in fact led to its fame, prompting the Portuguese to launch attacks on it and conquer it in the early 16th century.

=== Portuguese conquest ===
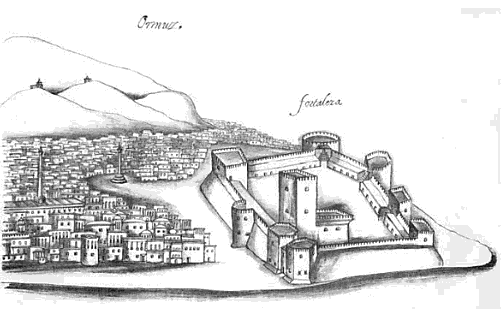
The Portuguese fortress of Hormuz

In September 1507, the Portuguese Afonso de Albuquerque landed on the island, and the Portuguese occupied Ormuz from 1515 to 1622.

As vassals of the Portuguese state, the Kingdom of Hormuz jointly participated in the 1521 invasion of Bahrain that ended Jabrid rule of the Persian Gulf archipelago. The Jabrid ruler was nominally a vassal of Hormuz, but the Jabrid King, Muqrin ibn Zamil had refused to pay the tribute Hormuz demanded, prompting the invasion under the command of the Portuguese conqueror, António Correia. In the fighting for Bahrain, most of the combat was carried out by Portuguese troops, while the Hormuzi admiral, Reis Xarafo, looked on.

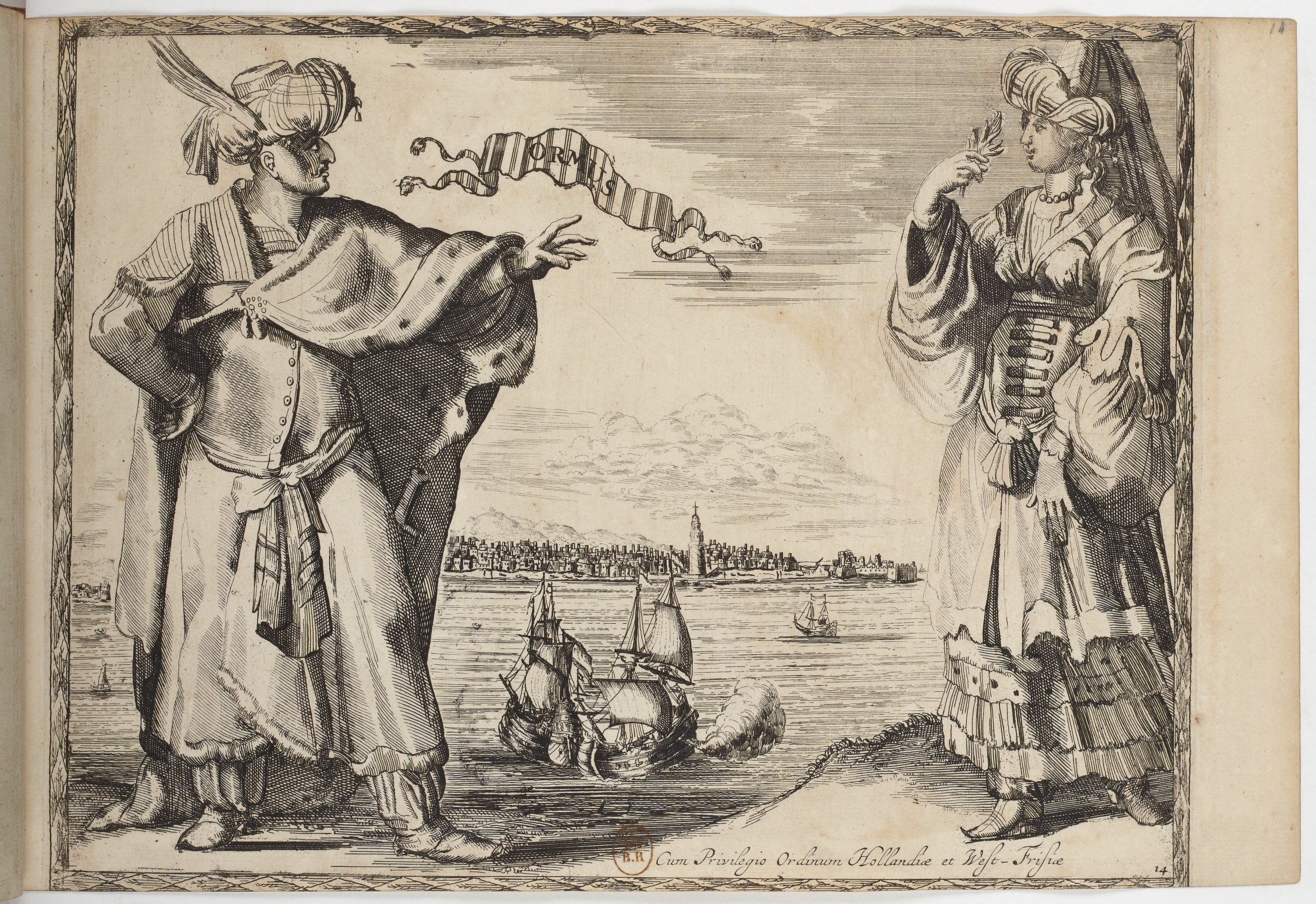
Ormus costumes (1670).

The Portuguese ruled Bahrain through a series of Hormuzi governors. However, the Sunni Hormuzi were not popular with Bahrain's Shia population which suffered religious disadvantages, prompting rebellion. In one case, the Hormuzi governor was crucified by rebels, and Portuguese rule came to an end in 1602 after the Hormuzi governor, who was a relative of the Hormuzi king, started executing members of Bahrain's leading families.

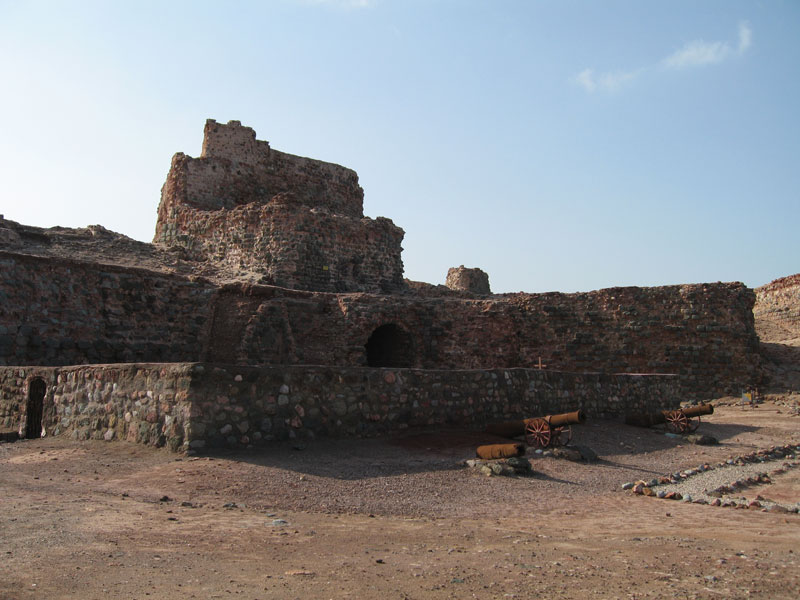
Portuguese Castle in Hormuz, or fort Nossa Senhora da Conceição

The kings of Hormuz under Portuguese rule were reduced to vassals of the Portuguese empire in India, mostly controlled from Goa. The archive of correspondence between the kings and local rulers of Hormuz, and some of its governors and people, and the kings of Portugal, contain the details of the kingdom's disintegration and the independence of its various parts. They show the attempts by rulers such as Kamal ud-Din Rashed trying to gain separate favour with the Portuguese in order to guarantee their own power. This reflects in the gradual independence of Muscat, previously a dependency of Hormuz, and its rise as one of the successor states to Hormuz.

After the Portuguese made several abortive attempts to seize control of Basra, the Safavid ruler Abbas the Great conquered the kingdom in 1622 with the help of the English, and expelled the Portuguese from the rest of the Persian Gulf, with the exception of Muscat. The Portuguese returned to the Persian Gulf in the following year as allies of Afrasiyab (the Pasha of Basra) against the Persians. Afrasiyab was formerly an Ottoman vassal but had been effectively independent since 1612. They never returned to Hormuz.

In the mid-17th century it was captured by the Imam of Oman, but was subsequently recaptured by Persians. Today, it is part of the Iranian province of Hormozgan.

== Population and administration ==
People from the Fars province made up the majority of the island's population, while Persian functioned as the primary language, with Arabic, Portuguese, and several other languages also in use. The kingdom's ruling family was of southern Arab origin, while its administration was mainly composed of Persians. In the 16th and 17th centuries, real power was usually held by the vizier, many of which came from Fal in Fars. There were conflicts between local Arabic and Persian speakers despite the kingdom's tolerance and multiculturalism, which was later exploited by the Portuguese.

== Religion ==
Although Sunni Islam was the state religion of the Kingdom of Hormuz, realpolitik made Turan Shah IV adopt the Taj-e Haydari of the Safavid order. By doing this, he showed his loyalty to Ismail I and Twelver Shi'ism. A Shia minority was eventually established in Hormuz as the religion grew in Safavid Iran. No instances of hostility between the two Muslim sects have been documented.

The island had a predominantly Jewish community from Spain. After 1567, the Portuguese banned Jews from coming to Hormuz. However, some still remained there.

== Accounts of Hormuzi society ==
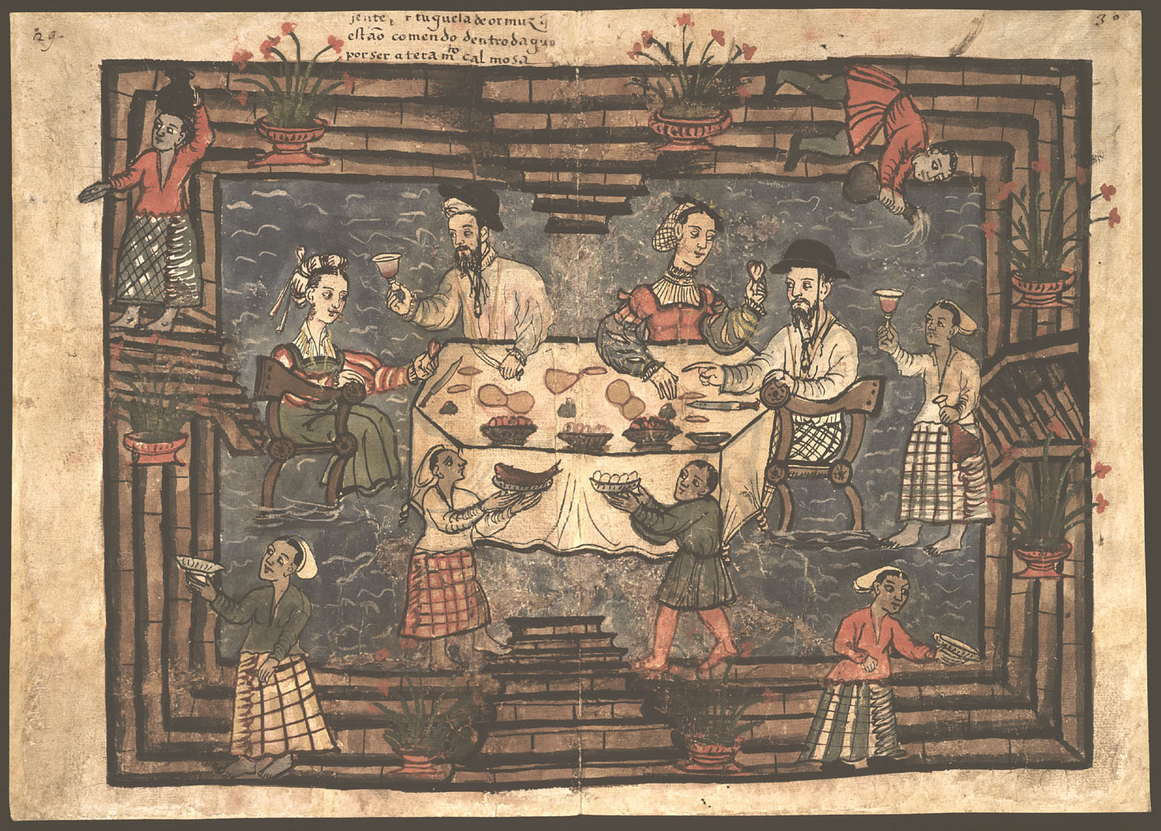
Portuguese household in Hormuz. Houses were purposely flooded because of the heat. Depicted in the Códice Casanatense

Situated between the Persian Gulf and the Indian Ocean, Hormuz was a "by-word for wealth and luxury", perhaps best captured in the Arab saying: "If all the world were a golden ring, Ormus would be the jewel in it". The city was also known for its licentiousness according to accounts by Portuguese visitors; Duarte Barbosa, one of the first Portuguese to travel to Ormuz in the early 16th century found:

The merchants of this isle and city are Persians and Arabs. The Persians [speak Arabic and another language which they call Psa], are tall and well-looking, and a fine and up-standing folk, both men and women; they are stout and comfortable. They hold the creed of Muhammad in great honour. They indulge themselves greatly, so much so that they keep among them youths for the purpose of abominable wickedness. They are musicians, and have instruments of diverse kinds.

This theme is also strong in Henry James Coleridge's account of Hormuz in his life of the Navarrese missionary, St Francis Xavier, who visited Hormuz on his way to Japan:

Its moral state was enormously and infamously bad. It was the home of the foulest sensuality, and of all the most corrupted forms of every religion in the East. The Christians were as bad as the rest in the extreme license of their lives. There were few priests, but they were a disgrace to their name. The Arabs and the Persians had introduced and made common the most detestable forms of vice. Ormuz was said to be a Babel for its confusion of tongues, and for its moral abominations to match the cities of the Plain. A lawful marriage was a rare exception. Foreigners, soldiers and merchants, threw off all restraint in the indulgence of their passions… Avarice was made a science: it was studied and practiced, not for gain, but for its own sake, and for the pleasure of cheating. Evil had become good, and it was thought good trade to break promises and think nothing of engagements…

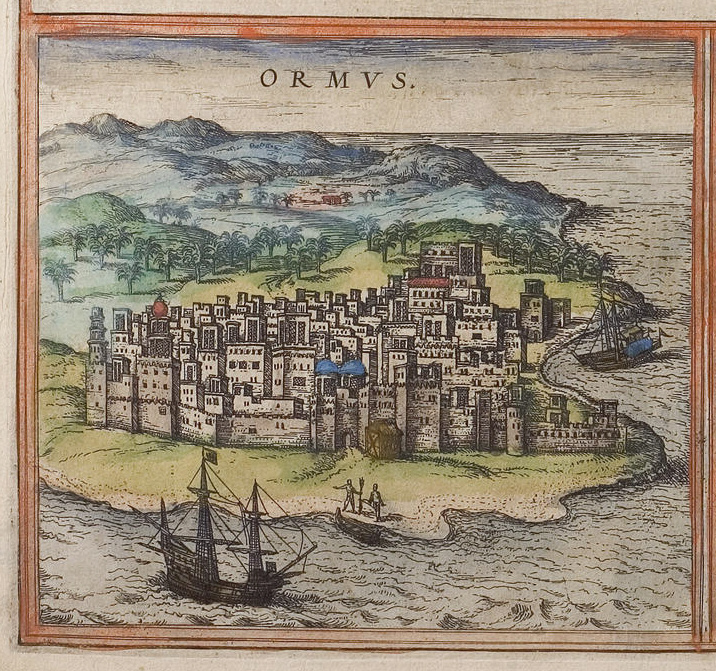
Hormuz in Civitates Orbis Terrarum, 1572.

Abbé Guillaume-Thomas-François Reynal described Hormuz as a wealthy and cosmopolitan commercial center. He noted its extensive trade, prosperous merchants, shaded streets, decorated houses and abundance of goods.

=== Strait toll ===
From approximately the eleventh century, the leaders of Hormuz started to enforce a fixed annual levy on all commercial traffic transiting the strait, a practice that mirrored the roughly contemporaneous Danish Sound Toll on Baltic shipping and the Byzantine, and later Ottoman, duties on vessels passing through the Turkish Straits.

After seizing Hormuz in 1515, the Portuguese institutionalized the toll through their own licensing system known as the Cartaz (safe-conduct pass), a system that physically compelled any vessel trading in the Persian Gulf to route their cargo through Portuguese customs houses in order to avoid being sunk or confiscated by Portuguese warships. By the early sixteenth century, customs revenue from transit trade was estimated by Portuguese sources at roughly 200,000 cruzados annually, a huge number given that the entire Portuguese crown’s total annual revenue in 1534 was about 1.1 million cruzados, reflecting the prominence of trade between India and West Asia at the time.

The system collapsed in 1622, when the Safavids and the East India Company, the latter of which was trying to monopolize international trade from India, expelled the Portuguese. This ended Hormuz's economic importance as a toll-collecting entrepôt and shifted the Gulf trade to Bandar Abbas, located on the mainland.

== Kings ==
List of Kings of Hormuz:

- Turan Shah IV (1514–1522)
- Mohammed Shah II (1522–1534)
- Salgur Shah II (1534–1544)
- Fakhru Al-Din Turan Shah V (1544–1564)
- Mohammed Shah III (1564–1565)
- Farkh Shah I (1565–1582)
- Turan Shah VI (1582–1598)
- Feruz Shah (1598–1610)
- Mohammed Shah IV (1610–1622)

== Depiction in literature ==
Hormuz is mentioned in a passage from John Milton's epic poem Paradise Lost (Book II, lines 1–5) where Satan's throne "Outshone the wealth of Ormus and of Ind", which Douglas Brooks states is Milton linking Hormuz to the "sublime but perverse orient". It is also mentioned in Andrew Marvell's poem "Bermudas", where pomegranates are described as "jewels more rich than Ormus shows". In Hart Crane's sonnet "To Emily Dickinson", it appears in the couplet: "Some reconcilement of remotest mind / Leaves Ormus rubyless, and Ophir chill." The closet drama Alaham by Fulke Greville is set in Hormuz. The Kingdom of Hormuz, referred to as 'Ormuz', is described in Hilary Mantel's novel Wolf Hall as "the driest kingdom in the world, where there are no trees and no crop but salt. Stand at its centre, and you look over thirty miles in all directions of ashy plain: beyond which lies the seashore, encrusted with pearls."

== See also ==
- List of Sunni Muslim dynasties
- Hormuz Island
- Hormizd I
- Portuguese Oman
- Portuguese–Safavid wars (1507–1521, 1621–1630, 1728)
- Ottoman–Portuguese conflicts (1538–1560)
  - Ottoman campaign against Hormuz
  - Battle of the Strait of Hormuz (1553)
  - Battle of the Gulf of Oman
