= 2017 Tour of Oman =

UCI Asia Tour

Race details
- Dates: 14–19 February 2017
- Stages: 6
- Distance: 878 km (546 mi)
- Winning time: 20h 56' 20"

Results
Jersey awarded to the overall winner	Winner	Ben Hermans (Belgium)	(BMC Racing Team)
	Second	Rui Costa (Portugal)	(UAE Abu Dhabi)
	Third	Fabio Aru (Italy)	(Astana)
Jersey awarded to the points classification winner	Points	Alexander Kristoff (Norway)	(Team Katusha–Alpecin)
Jersey awarded to the young rider classification winner	Young rider	Merhawi Kudus (Eritrea)	(Team Dimension Data)
Jersey awarded to the combativity classification winner	Combativity	Aimé De Gendt (Belgium)	(Sport Vlaanderen–Baloise)
	Team	Team Dimension Data	

The 2017 Tour of Oman was a road cycling stage race that took place between 14 and 19 February 2017 in Oman. It was the eighth edition of the Tour of Oman and was rated as a 2.HC race as part of the 2017 UCI Asia Tour. The previous year's winner, Vincenzo Nibali, did not defend his title.

The race was won by Belgium's Ben Hermans, as part of the BMC Racing Team; Hermans took the race lead after winning the second stage of the race, and further extended his lead with a victory in the queen stage of the race, finishing at Jabal Al Akhdhar. Hermans won the race by 22 seconds ahead of Portuguese rider Rui Costa (UAE Abu Dhabi), who finished second on two stages during the race. The podium was completed by Astana's Fabio Aru from Italy, who was a further 13 seconds in arrears of Costa.

Hermans duked it out for the points classification victory with Norwegian sprinter Alexander Kristoff (Team Katusha–Alpecin), with the honours ultimately going to Kristoff, who won three of the remaining four stages of the race. The young rider classification was won by Eritrea's Merhawi Kudus, who finished in fourth place overall for Team Dimension Data, while Belgian Aimé De Gendt (Sport Vlaanderen–Baloise) won the combativity classification for points won at intermediate sprints and noted climbs. With Kudus, Lachlan Morton and Nathan Haas all finishing within the top ten overall, Team Dimension Data won the teams classification.

== Teams ==
Eighteen teams were invited to take part in the race. These included nine UCI WorldTeams and nine UCI Professional Continental teams.

UCI WorldTeams

- AG2R La Mondiale
- Astana
- Bahrain–Merida
- BMC Racing Team
- Team Dimension Data
- Team Katusha–Alpecin
- Quick-Step Floors
- Team Sunweb
- UAE Abu Dhabi

UCI Professional Continental Teams

- Aqua Blue Sport
- CCC–Sprandi–Polkowice
- Delko–Marseille Provence KTM
- Nippo–Vini Fantini
- Sport Vlaanderen–Baloise
- UnitedHealthcare
- Wanty–Groupe Gobert
- WB Veranclassic Aqua Protect
- Wilier Triestina–Selle Italia

== Route ==
The route for the race was announced on 27 January 2017.

Stage schedule
Stage	Date	Route	Distance	Type	Winner
1	14 February	Al Sawadi Beach to Naseem Park	173 km (107 mi)	Flat stage	Alexander Kristoff (NOR)
2	15 February	Nakhal to Al Bustan	142 km (88 mi)	Hilly stage	Ben Hermans (BEL)
3	16 February	Sultan Qaboos University to Quriyat	162 km (101 mi)	Hilly stage	Søren Kragh Andersen (DNK)
4	17 February	Yiti to Ministry of Tourism	118 km (73 mi)	Hilly stage	Alexander Kristoff (NOR)
5	18 February	Samail to Jabal Al Akhdhar	152.5 km (95 mi)	Medium-mountain stage	Ben Hermans (BEL)
6	19 February	The Wave Muscat to Matrah Corniche	130.5 km (81 mi)	Flat stage	Alexander Kristoff (NOR)

== Stages ==
=== Stage 1 ===
14 February 2017 — Al Sawadi Beach to Naseem Park, 173 km (107 mi)

Result of Stage 1
Rank	Rider	Team	Time
1	Alexander Kristoff (NOR)	Team Katusha–Alpecin	3h 46' 29"
2	Kristian Sbaragli (ITA)	Team Dimension Data	+ 0"
3	Sonny Colbrelli (ITA)	Bahrain–Merida	+ 0"
4	Lasse Norman Hansen (DNK)	Aqua Blue Sport	+ 0"
5	Lucas Sebastián Haedo (ARG)	UnitedHealthcare	+ 0"
6	Jakub Mareczko (ITA)	Wilier Triestina–Selle Italia	+ 0"
7	Roy Jans (BEL)	WB Veranclassic Aqua Protect	+ 0"
8	Benjamin Giraud (FRA)	Delko–Marseille Provence KTM	+ 0"
9	Sacha Modolo (ITA)	UAE Abu Dhabi	+ 0"
10	Manuel Belletti (ITA)	Wilier Triestina–Selle Italia	+ 0"

General classification after Stage 1
Rank	Rider	Team	Time
1	Alexander Kristoff (NOR)	Team Katusha–Alpecin	3h 46' 19"
2	Kristian Sbaragli (ITA)	Team Dimension Data	+ 4"
3	Aimé De Gendt (BEL)	Sport Vlaanderen–Baloise	+ 4"
4	Sonny Colbrelli (ITA)	Bahrain–Merida	+ 6"
5	Giuseppe Fonzi (ITA)	Wilier Triestina–Selle Italia	+ 6"
6	Larry Warbasse (USA)	Aqua Blue Sport	+ 9"
7	Alan Marangoni (ITA)	Nippo–Vini Fantini	+ 9"
8	Lasse Norman Hansen (DNK)	Aqua Blue Sport	+ 10"
9	Lucas Sebastián Haedo (ARG)	UnitedHealthcare	+ 10"
10	Jakub Mareczko (ITA)	Wilier Triestina–Selle Italia	+ 10"

=== Stage 2 ===
15 February 2017 — Nakhal to Al Bustan, 142 km (88 mi)

Result of Stage 2
Rank	Rider	Team	Time
1	Ben Hermans (BEL)	BMC Racing Team	3h 20' 49"
2	Rui Costa (POR)	UAE Abu Dhabi	+ 0"
3	Jakob Fuglsang (DNK)	Astana	+ 0"
4	Merhawi Kudus (ERI)	Team Dimension Data	+ 4"
5	Nathan Haas (AUS)	Team Dimension Data	+ 7"
6	David de la Cruz (ESP)	Quick-Step Floors	+ 7"
7	Fabio Aru (ITA)	Astana	+ 7"
8	Janier Acevedo (COL)	UnitedHealthcare	+ 7"
9	Greg Van Avermaet (BEL)	BMC Racing Team	+ 7"
10	Romain Bardet (FRA)	AG2R La Mondiale	+ 7"

General classification after Stage 2
Rank	Rider	Team	Time
1	Ben Hermans (BEL)	BMC Racing Team	7h 07' 08"
2	Rui Costa (POR)	UAE Abu Dhabi	+ 4"
3	Jakob Fuglsang (DNK)	Astana	+ 6"
4	Merhawi Kudus (ERI)	Team Dimension Data	+ 14"
5	Nathan Haas (AUS)	Team Dimension Data	+ 17"
6	Fabio Aru (ITA)	Astana	+ 17"
7	Janier Acevedo (COL)	UnitedHealthcare	+ 17"
8	David de la Cruz (ESP)	Quick-Step Floors	+ 17"
9	Mathias Frank (SUI)	AG2R La Mondiale	+ 17"
10	Romain Bardet (FRA)	AG2R La Mondiale	+ 17"

=== Stage 3 ===
16 February 2017 — Sultan Qaboos University to Quriyat, 162 km (101 mi)

Result of Stage 3
Rank	Rider	Team	Time
1	Søren Kragh Andersen (DNK)	Team Sunweb	3h 53' 11"
2	Rui Costa (POR)	UAE Abu Dhabi	+ 0"
3	Ben Hermans (BEL)	BMC Racing Team	+ 0"
4	Laurens De Plus (BEL)	Quick-Step Floors	+ 0"
5	Jakob Fuglsang (DNK)	Astana	+ 0"
6	David de la Cruz (ESP)	Quick-Step Floors	+ 0"
7	Romain Bardet (FRA)	AG2R La Mondiale	+ 0"
8	Merhawi Kudus (ERI)	Team Dimension Data	+ 0"
9	Fabio Aru (ITA)	Astana	+ 4"
10	Lachlan Morton (AUS)	Team Dimension Data	+ 4"

General classification after Stage 3
Rank	Rider	Team	Time
1	Ben Hermans (BEL)	BMC Racing Team	11h 00' 15"
2	Rui Costa (POR)	UAE Abu Dhabi	+ 2"
3	Jakob Fuglsang (DNK)	Astana	+ 10"
4	Merhawi Kudus (ERI)	Team Dimension Data	+ 18"
5	David de la Cruz (ESP)	Quick-Step Floors	+ 21"
6	Romain Bardet (FRA)	AG2R La Mondiale	+ 21"
7	Laurens De Plus (BEL)	Quick-Step Floors	+ 21"
8	Søren Kragh Andersen (DNK)	Team Sunweb	+ 21"
9	Fabio Aru (ITA)	Astana	+ 25"
10	Janier Acevedo (COL)	UnitedHealthcare	+ 25"

=== Stage 4 ===
17 February 2017 — Yiti to Ministry of Tourism, 118 km (73 mi)

Result of Stage 4
Rank	Rider	Team	Time
1	Alexander Kristoff (NOR)	Team Katusha–Alpecin	2h 50' 29"
2	Sonny Colbrelli (ITA)	Bahrain–Merida	+ 0"
3	Greg Van Avermaet (BEL)	BMC Racing Team	+ 0"
4	Nathan Haas (AUS)	Team Dimension Data	+ 0"
5	Marko Kump (SLO)	UAE Abu Dhabi	+ 0"
6	Kristian Sbaragli (ITA)	Team Dimension Data	+ 0"
7	Benjamin Declercq (BEL)	Sport Vlaanderen–Baloise	+ 0"
8	Oliver Naesen (BEL)	AG2R La Mondiale	+ 0"
9	Yves Lampaert (BEL)	Quick-Step Floors	+ 0"
10	Marco Canola (ITA)	Nippo–Vini Fantini	+ 0"

General classification after Stage 4
Rank	Rider	Team	Time
1	Ben Hermans (BEL)	BMC Racing Team	13h 50' 41"
2	Rui Costa (POR)	UAE Abu Dhabi	+ 5"
3	Jakob Fuglsang (DNK)	Astana	+ 13"
4	Merhawi Kudus (ERI)	Team Dimension Data	+ 21"
5	David de la Cruz (ESP)	Quick-Step Floors	+ 22"
6	Romain Bardet (FRA)	AG2R La Mondiale	+ 23"
7	Greg Van Avermaet (BEL)	BMC Racing Team	+ 24"
8	Laurens De Plus (BEL)	Quick-Step Floors	+ 24"
9	Søren Kragh Andersen (DNK)	Team Sunweb	+ 24"
10	Fabio Aru (ITA)	Astana	+ 28"

=== Stage 5 ===
18 February 2017 — Samail to Jabal Al Akhdhar, 152.5 km (95 mi)

Result of Stage 5
Rank	Rider	Team	Time
1	Ben Hermans (BEL)	BMC Racing Team	4h 08' 46"
2	Fabio Aru (ITA)	Astana	+ 3"
3	Rui Costa (POR)	UAE Abu Dhabi	+ 11"
4	Giovanni Visconti (ITA)	Bahrain–Merida	+ 27"
5	Merhawi Kudus (ERI)	Team Dimension Data	+ 27"
6	Tsgabu Grmay (ETH)	Bahrain–Merida	+ 34"
7	Lachlan Morton (AUS)	Team Dimension Data	+ 38"
8	Mathias Frank (SUI)	AG2R La Mondiale	+ 41"
9	Nathan Haas (AUS)	Team Dimension Data	+ 44"
10	Romain Bardet (FRA)	AG2R La Mondiale	+ 44"

General classification after Stage 5
Rank	Rider	Team	Time
1	Ben Hermans (BEL)	BMC Racing Team	17h 59' 17"
2	Rui Costa (POR)	UAE Abu Dhabi	+ 22"
3	Fabio Aru (ITA)	Astana	+ 35"
4	Merhawi Kudus (ERI)	Team Dimension Data	+ 58"
5	Tsgabu Grmay (ETH)	Bahrain–Merida	+ 1' 12"
6	Romain Bardet (FRA)	AG2R La Mondiale	+ 1' 17"
7	Mathias Frank (SUI)	AG2R La Mondiale	+ 1' 19"
8	Lachlan Morton (AUS)	Team Dimension Data	+ 1' 21"
9	Giovanni Visconti (ITA)	Bahrain–Merida	+ 1' 33"
10	Nathan Haas (AUS)	Team Dimension Data	+ 1' 38"

=== Stage 6 ===
19 February 2017 — The Wave Muscat to Matrah Corniche, 130.5 km (81 mi)

Result of Stage 6
Rank	Rider	Team	Time
1	Alexander Kristoff (NOR)	Team Katusha–Alpecin	2h 57' 03"
2	Eduard-Michael Grosu (ROM)	Nippo–Vini Fantini	+ 0"
3	Sacha Modolo (ITA)	UAE Abu Dhabi	+ 0"
4	Bert Van Lerberghe (BEL)	Sport Vlaanderen–Baloise	+ 0"
5	Manuel Belletti (ITA)	Wilier Triestina–Selle Italia	+ 0"
6	Ramon Sinkeldam (NED)	Team Sunweb	+ 0"
7	Sonny Colbrelli (ITA)	Bahrain–Merida	+ 0"
8	Lasse Norman Hansen (DNK)	Aqua Blue Sport	+ 0"
9	Kristian Sbaragli (ITA)	Team Dimension Data	+ 0"
10	Roy Jans (BEL)	WB Veranclassic Aqua Protect	+ 0"

Final general classification
Rank	Rider	Team	Time
1	Ben Hermans (BEL)	BMC Racing Team	20h 56' 20"
2	Rui Costa (POR)	UAE Abu Dhabi	+ 22"
3	Fabio Aru (ITA)	Astana	+ 35"
4	Merhawi Kudus (ERI)	Team Dimension Data	+ 58"
5	Tsgabu Grmay (ETH)	Bahrain–Merida	+ 1' 12"
6	Romain Bardet (FRA)	AG2R La Mondiale	+ 1' 17"
7	Mathias Frank (SUI)	AG2R La Mondiale	+ 1' 19"
8	Lachlan Morton (AUS)	Team Dimension Data	+ 1' 21"
9	Giovanni Visconti (ITA)	Bahrain–Merida	+ 1' 33"
10	Nathan Haas (AUS)	Team Dimension Data	+ 1' 38"

== Classification leadership table ==
There were five principal classifications in the 2017 Tour of Oman.

The first and most important was the general classification; the winner of this was considered the overall winner of the race. It was calculated by adding together each rider's times on each stage, then applying bonuses. Bonuses were awarded for coming in the top three on a stage (10 seconds for the winner, 6 seconds for the second placed rider and 4 seconds for the rider in third) or at intermediate sprints (3 seconds, 2 seconds and 1 second for the top three riders). The rider in the lead of the general classification wore a red jersey.

The second competition was the points classification, calculated by awarding points for the top 10 riders at the finish of each stage (15 points to the winner down to 1 point for the rider in tenth place) and to the top three at intermediate sprints (3 points, 2 points and 1 point). The rider with the highest points total was the leader of the classification and wore a green jersey. The young rider classification was open to those born on or after 1 January 1992. The young rider ranked highest in the general classification was the leader of the young rider classification and wore a white jersey.

The combativity classification was based on points won at intermediate sprints and classified climbs along the route. Points were awarded to the top three riders across each sprint or climb (3 points, 2 points and 1 point). The rider with the most accumulated points was the leader of the classification and wore a white jersey with red and green polka dots. The final competition was the team classification. On each stage, each team was awarded a time based on the cumulative time of its top three riders; the times for each stage were then added together and the team with the lowest total time was the leader of the team classification.

Classification leadership by stage
Stage	Winner	General classification	Points classification	Young rider classification	Combativity classification	Team classification
1	Alexander Kristoff	Alexander Kristoff	Alexander Kristoff	Aimé De Gendt	Aimé De Gendt	UAE Abu Dhabi
2	Ben Hermans	Ben Hermans	Alexander Kristoff	Merhawi Kudus	Mark Christian	Team Dimension Data
3	Søren Kragh Andersen	Ben Hermans	Ben Hermans	Merhawi Kudus	Mark Christian	Team Dimension Data
4	Alexander Kristoff	Ben Hermans	Alexander Kristoff	Merhawi Kudus	Stefan Denifl	Team Dimension Data
5	Ben Hermans	Ben Hermans	Ben Hermans	Merhawi Kudus	Mark Christian	Team Dimension Data
6	Alexander Kristoff	Ben Hermans	Alexander Kristoff	Merhawi Kudus	Aimé De Gendt	Team Dimension Data
Final		Ben Hermans	Alexander Kristoff	Merhawi Kudus	Aimé De Gendt	Team Dimension Data
