= 2023 Tour of Oman =

Omani cycling race

2023 UCI ProSeries

Race details
- Dates: 11–15 February 2023
- Stages: 5
- Distance: 831 km (516 mi)

Results
Jersey awarded to the overall winner	Winner	Matteo Jorgenson (USA)	(Movistar Team)
	Second	Mauri Vansevenant (BEL)	(Soudal–Quick-Step)
	Third	Geoffrey Bouchard (FRA)	(AG2R Citroën Team)
Jersey awarded to the points classification winner	Points	Matteo Jorgenson (USA)	(Movistar Team)
Jersey awarded to the young rider classification winner	Young rider	Matteo Jorgenson (USA)	(Movistar Team)
Jersey awarded to the sprints classification winner	Sprints	Fredrik Dversnes (NOR)	(Uno-X Pro Cycling Team)
	Team	(Germany) Bora–Hansgrohe	

The 2023 Tour of Oman is a road cycling stage race that took place between 11 and 15 February 2023 in Oman. The race is rated as a category 2. Pro event on the 2023 UCI ProSeries calendar, and will be the 12th edition of the Tour of Oman.

== Teams ==
Eight of the 18 UCI WorldTeams, seven UCI ProTeams, two UCI Continentalteams, and the Omani national team made up the 18 teams that participated in the race.

UCI WorldTeams

- AG2R Citroën Team
- Astana Qazaqstan Team
- Bora–Hansgrohe
- Cofidis
- Intermarché–Circus–Wanty
- Movistar Team
- Soudal–Quick-Step
- UAE Team Emirates

UCI ProTeams

- Arkéa–Samsic
- Bingoal WB
- Burgos BH
- Equipo Kern Pharma
- Human Powered Health
- Lotto–Dstny
- Uno-X Pro Cycling Team

UCI Continental Teams

- JCL Team UKYO
- Terengganu Polygon Cycling Team

National Teams

- Oman

== Route ==
Stage characteristics and winners
Stage	Date	Course	Distance	Type	Stage winner
1	11 February	Al Rustaq Fort to Oman Convention and Exhibition Centre	147.5 km (91.7 mi)	Flat stage	Tim Merlier (BEL)
2	12 February	Sultan Qaboos University to Qurayyat	174 km (108 mi)	Hilly stage	Jesús Herrada (ESP)
3	13 February	Al Khobar to Jabal Hatt	152 km (94 mi)	Hilly stage	Matteo Jorgenson (USA)
4	14 February	Izki to Yitti Hills	205 km (127 mi)	Hilly stage	Diego Ulissi (ITA)
5	15 February	Samail (Al Feyhaa Resthouse) to Jabal al Akhdhar (Green Mountain)	152.5 km (94.8 mi)	Mountain stage	Mauri Vansevenant (BEL)
Total			831 km (516 mi)		

== Stages ==
=== Stage 1 ===
11 February 2023 — Al Rustaq Fort to Oman Convention and Exhibition Centre, 147.5 km (91.7 mi)

Stage 1 Result (1–10)
Rank	Rider	Team	Time
1	Tim Merlier (BEL)	Soudal–Quick-Step	3h 31' 00"
2	David Dekker (NED)	Arkéa–Samsic	+ 0"
3	Axel Zingle (FRA)	Cofidis	+ 0"
4	Arne Marit (BEL)	Intermarché–Circus–Wanty	+ 0"
5	Kristoffer Halvorsen (NOR)	Uno-X Pro Cycling Team	+ 0"
6	Pascal Ackermann (GER)	UAE Team Emirates	+ 0"
7	Matthew Walls (GBR)	Bora–Hansgrohe	+ 0"
8	Alexander Salby (DEN)	Bingoal WB	+ 0"
9	Max Kanter (GER)	Movistar Team	+ 0"
10	Rüdiger Selig (GER)	Lotto–Dstny	+ 0"

General classification after Stage 1 (1–10)
Rank	Rider	Team	Time
1	Tim Merlier (BEL)	Soudal–Quick-Step	3h 31' 00"
2	David Dekker (NED)	Arkéa–Samsic	+ 4"
3	Jeroen Meijers (NED)	Terengganu Polygon Cycling Team	+ 5"
4	Axel Zingle (FRA)	Cofidis	+ 6"
5	Rodrigo Álvarez (ESP)	Burgos BH	+ 6"
6	Arne Marit (BEL)	Intermarché–Circus–Wanty	+ 10"
7	Kristoffer Halvorsen (NOR)	Uno-X Pro Cycling Team	+ 10"
8	Pascal Ackermann (GER)	UAE Team Emirates	+ 10"
9	Matthew Walls (GBR)	Bora–Hansgrohe	+ 10"
10	Alexander Salby (DEN)	Bingoal WB	+ 10"

=== Stage 2 ===
12 February 2023 — Sultan Qaboos University to Qurayyat, 174 km (108 mi)

Stage 2 Result (1–10)
Rank	Rider	Team	Time
1	Jesús Herrada (ESP)	Cofidis	4h 21' 07"
2	Maxim Van Gils (BEL)	Lotto–Dstny	+ 3"
3	Diego Ulissi (ITA)	UAE Team Emirates	+ 3"
4	Matteo Jorgenson (USA)	Movistar Team	+ 3"
5	Mauri Vansevenant (BEL)	Soudal–Quick-Step	+ 3"
6	Alexey Lutsenko (KAZ)	Astana Qazaqstan Team	+ 5"
7	Rémy Rochas (FRA)	Cofidis	+ 5"
8	Cristián Rodríguez (ESP)	Arkéa–Samsic	+ 5"
9	Stan Dewulf (BEL)	AG2R Citroën Team	+ 5"
10	Davide Formolo (ITA)	UAE Team Emirates	+ 5"

General classification after Stage 2 (1–10)
Rank	Rider	Team	Time
1	Jesús Herrada (ESP)	Cofidis	7h 51' 57"
2	Maxim Van Gils (BEL)	Lotto–Dstny	+ 4"
3	Diego Ulissi (ITA)	UAE Team Emirates	+ 6"
4	Mauri Vansevenant (BEL)	Soudal–Quick-Step	+ 10"
5	Matteo Jorgenson (USA)	Movistar Team	+ 10"
6	Alexey Lutsenko (KAZ)	Astana Qazaqstan Team	+ 13"
7	Davide Formolo (ITA)	UAE Team Emirates	+ 15"
8	Lennert Teugels (BEL)	Bingoal WB	+ 15"
9	Niklas Eg (DEN)	Uno-X Pro Cycling Team	+ 15"
10	Harold Tejada (COL)	Astana Qazaqstan Team	+ 15"

=== Stage 3 ===
13 February 2023 — Al Khobar to Jabal Haat, 152 km (94 mi)

Stage 3 Result (1–10)
Rank	Rider	Team	Time
1	Matteo Jorgenson (USA)	Movistar Team	3h 33' 51"
2	Mauri Vansevenant (BEL)	Soudal–Quick-Step	+ 2"
3	Geoffrey Bouchard (FRA)	AG2R Citroën Team	+ 3"
4	Cristián Rodríguez (ESP)	Arkéa–Samsic	+ 3"
5	Cian Uijtdebroeks (BEL)	Bora–Hansgrohe	+ 3"
6	Victor Langellotti (MON)	Burgos BH	+ 3"
7	Rein Taaramäe (EST)	Intermarché–Circus–Wanty	+ 3"
8	Harold Tejada (COL)	Astana Qazaqstan Team	+ 7"
9	Diego Ulissi (ITA)	UAE Team Emirates	+ 9"
10	Maxim Van Gils (BEL)	Lotto–Dstny	+ 11"

General classification after Stage 3 (1–10)
Rank	Rider	Team	Time
1	Matteo Jorgenson (USA)	Movistar Team	11h 25' 48"
2	Mauri Vansevenant (BEL)	Soudal–Quick-Step	+ 6"
3	Geoffrey Bouchard (FRA)	AG2R Citroën Team	+ 14"
4	Diego Ulissi (ITA)	UAE Team Emirates	+ 15"
5	Maxim Van Gils (BEL)	Lotto–Dstny	+ 15"
6	Jesús Herrada (ESP)	Cofidis	+ 16"
7	Rein Taaramäe (EST)	Intermarché–Circus–Wanty	+ 18"
8	Victor Langellotti (MON)	Burgos BH	+ 18"
9	Cian Uijtdebroeks (BEL)	Bora–Hansgrohe	+ 18"
10	Cristián Rodríguez (ESP)	Arkéa–Samsic	+ 18"

=== Stage 4 ===
14 February 2023 — Izki to Yitti Hills, 205 km (127 mi)

Stage 4 Result (1–10)
Rank	Rider	Team	Time
1	Diego Ulissi (ITA)	UAE Team Emirates	4h 36' 48"
2	Axel Zingle (FRA)	Cofidis	+ 0"
3	Ide Schelling (NED)	Bora–Hansgrohe	+ 0"
4	Jordi Warlop (BEL)	Soudal–Quick-Step	+ 0"
5	Louis Bendixen (DEN)	Uno-X Pro Cycling Team	+ 0"
6	Jenthe Biermans (BEL)	Arkéa–Samsic	+ 0"
7	Andrea Vendrame (ITA)	AG2R Citroën Team	+ 0"
8	Maxim Van Gils (BEL)	Lotto–Dstny	+ 0"
9	Jesús Herrada (ESP)	Cofidis	+ 0"
10	Alexey Lutsenko (KAZ)	Astana Qazaqstan Team	+ 0"

General classification after Stage 4 (1–10)
Rank	Rider	Team	Time
1	Matteo Jorgenson (USA)	Movistar Team	16h 02' 36"
2	Diego Ulissi (ITA)	UAE Team Emirates	+ 5"
3	Mauri Vansevenant (BEL)	Soudal–Quick-Step	+ 5"
4	Geoffrey Bouchard (FRA)	AG2R Citroën Team	+ 14"
5	Maxim Van Gils (BEL)	Lotto–Dstny	+ 15"
6	Jesús Herrada (ESP)	Cofidis	+ 16"
7	Rein Taaramäe (EST)	Intermarché–Circus–Wanty	+ 18"
8	Victor Langellotti (MON)	Burgos BH	+ 18"
9	Cian Uijtdebroeks (BEL)	Bora–Hansgrohe	+ 18"
10	Cristián Rodríguez (ESP)	Arkéa–Samsic	+ 18"

=== Stage 5 ===
15 February 2023 — Samail (Al Feyhaa Resthouse) to Jabal al Akhdhar (Green Mountain), 152.5 km (94.8 mi)

Stage 5 Result (1–10)
Rank	Rider	Team	Time
1	Mauri Vansevenant (BEL)	Soudal–Quick-Step	3h 53' 51"
2	Matteo Jorgenson (USA)	Movistar Team	+ 0"
3	Geoffrey Bouchard (FRA)	AG2R Citroën Team	+ 12"
4	Rein Taaramäe (EST)	Intermarché–Circus–Wanty	+ 22"
5	Maxim Van Gils (BEL)	Lotto–Dstny	+ 37"
6	Diego Ulissi (ITA)	UAE Team Emirates	+ 37"
7	Cristián Rodríguez (ESP)	Arkéa–Samsic	+ 58"
8	Maxim Van Gils (BEL)	Lotto–Dstny	+ 58"
9	Jesús Herrada (ESP)	Cofidis	+ 1' 00"
10	Cian Uijtdebroeks (BEL)	Bora–Hansgrohe	+ 1' 12"

General classification after Stage 5 (1–10)
Rank	Rider	Team	Time
1	Matteo Jorgenson (USA)	Movistar Team	19h 56' 21"
2	Mauri Vansevenant (BEL)	Soudal–Quick-Step	+ 1"
3	Geoffrey Bouchard (FRA)	AG2R Citroën Team	+ 28"
4	Rein Taaramäe (EST)	Intermarché–Circus–Wanty	+ 46"
5	Diego Ulissi (ITA)	UAE Team Emirates	+ 48"
6	Maxim Van Gils (BEL)	Lotto–Dstny	+ 58"
7	Jesús Herrada (ESP)	Cofidis	+ 1' 20"
8	Cristián Rodríguez (ESP)	Arkéa–Samsic	+ 1' 22"
9	Cian Uijtdebroeks (BEL)	Bora–Hansgrohe	+ 1' 36"
10	Carlos Verona (ESP)	Movistar Team	+ 1' 37"

== Classification leadership table ==
Classification leadership by stage
Stage	Winner	General classification	Points classification	Aggressive rider classification	Young rider classification	Team classification
1	Tim Merlier	Tim Merlier	Tim Merlier	Jeroen Meijers	David Dekker	UAE Team Emirates
2	Jesús Herrada	Jesús Herrada	Jesús Herrada	Jeroen Meijers	Maxim Van Gils	Burgos BH
3	Matteo Jorgenson	Matteo Jorgenson	Matteo Jorgenson	Jeroen Meijers	Matteo Jorgenson	Bora–Hansgrohe
4	Diego Ulissi	Matteo Jorgenson	Diego Ulissi	Fredrik Dversnes	Matteo Jorgenson	Bora–Hansgrohe
5	Mauri Vansevenant	Matteo Jorgenson	Matteo Jorgenson	Fredrik Dversnes	Matteo Jorgenson	Bora–Hansgrohe
Final		Matteo Jorgenson	Matteo Jorgenson	Fredrik Dversnes	Matteo Jorgenson	Bora–Hansgrohe

== Classification standings ==
Legend
Denotes the winner of the general classification	Denotes the winner of the aggressive rider classification
Denotes the winner of the points classification	Denotes the winner of the young rider classification

=== General classification ===
Final general classification (1–10)
Rank	Rider	Team	Time
1	Matteo Jorgenson (USA)	Movistar Team	19h 56' 21"
2	Mauri Vansevenant (BEL)	Soudal–Quick-Step	+ 1"
3	Geoffrey Bouchard (FRA)	AG2R Citroën Team	+ 28"
4	Rein Taaramäe (EST)	Intermarché–Circus–Wanty	+ 46"
5	Diego Ulissi (ITA)	UAE Team Emirates	+ 48"
6	Maxim Van Gils (BEL)	Lotto–Dstny	+ 58"
7	Jesús Herrada (ESP)	Cofidis	+ 1' 20"
8	Cristián Rodríguez (ESP)	Arkéa–Samsic	+ 1' 22"
9	Cian Uijtdebroeks (BEL)	Bora–Hansgrohe	+ 1' 36"
10	Carlos Verona (ESP)	Movistar Team	+ 1' 37"

=== Points classification ===
Final points classification (1–10)
Rank	Rider	Team	Time
1	Matteo Jorgenson (USA)	Movistar Team	34
2	Mauri Vansevenant (BEL)	Soudal–Quick-Step	33
3	Diego Ulissi (ITA)	UAE Team Emirates	31
4	Maxim Van Gils (BEL)	Lotto–Dstny	22
5	Axel Zingle (FRA)	Cofidis	21
6	Jesús Herrada (ESP)	Cofidis	20
7	Geoffrey Bouchard (FRA)	AG2R Citroën Team	18
8	Tim Merlier (BEL)	Soudal–Quick-Step	17
9	Cristián Rodríguez (ESP)	Arkéa–Samsic	14
10	David Dekker (NED)	Arkéa–Samsic	12

=== Aggressive rider classification ===
Final aggressive rider classification (1–10)
Rank	Rider	Team	Time
1	Fredrik Dversnes (NOR)	Uno-X Pro Cycling Team	15
2	Jeroen Meijers (NED)	Terengganu Polygon Cycling Team	11
3	Iván Cobo Cayon (ESP)	Equipo Kern Pharma	9
4	Matteo Jorgenson (USA)	Movistar Team	7
5	Mauri Vansevenant (BEL)	Soudal–Quick-Step	6
6	Johan Meens (BEL)	Bingoal WB	6
7	Rodrigo Álvarez (ESP)	Burgos BH	6
8	Lawrence Naesen (BEL)	AG2R Citroën Team	4
9	Said Al Rahbi (OMA)	JCL Team UKYO	4
10	Jesús Herrada (ESP)	Cofidis	3

=== Young rider classification ===
Final young rider classification (1–10)
Rank	Rider	Team	Time
1	Matteo Jorgenson (USA)	Movistar Team	19h 56' 21"
2	Mauri Vansevenant (BEL)	Soudal–Quick-Step	+ 1"
3	Maxim Van Gils (BEL)	Lotto–Dstny	+ 58"
4	Cian Uijtdebroeks (BEL)	Bora–Hansgrohe	+ 1' 36"
5	Sylvain Moniquet (BEL)	Lotto–Dstny	+ 2' 44"
6	Michel Ries (LUX)	Arkéa–Samsic	+ 3' 27"
7	Ide Schelling (NED)	Bora–Hansgrohe	+ 5' 38"
8	Magnus Kulset (NOR)	Uno-X Pro Cycling Team	+ 5' 41"
9	Pablo Castrillo (ESP)	Equipo Kern Pharma	+ 6' 01"
10	Embret Svestad-Bårdseng (NOR)	Human Powered Health	+ 6' 35"

=== Team classification ===
Final team classification (1–10)
Rank	Team	Time
1	(Germany) Bora–Hansgrohe	59h 55' 12"
2	(Belgium) Soudal–Quick-Step	+ 2' 36"
3	(Belgium) Intermarché–Circus–Wanty	+ 2' 46"
4	(France) Arkéa–Samsic	+ 2' 47"
5	(France) AG2R Citroën Team	+ 4' 52"
6	(Belgium) Lotto–Dstny	+ 5' 49"
7	(Spain) Movistar Team	+ 7' 28"
8	(United Arab Emirates) UAE Team Emirates	+ 9' 15"
9	(Spain) Burgos BH	+ 9' 30"
10	(Spain) Equipo Kern Pharma	+ 10' 03"
