= 2013 Tour of Oman =

Race details
- Dates: 11–16 February
- Stages: 6
- Distance: 938.5 km (583.2 mi)
- Winning time: 23h 28' 23"

Results
Jersey awarded to the overall winner	Winner	Chris Froome (GBR)	(Team Sky)
	Second	Alberto Contador (ESP)	(Saxo–Tinkoff)
	Third	Cadel Evans (AUS)	(BMC Racing Team)
Jersey awarded to the points classification winner	Points	Chris Froome (GBR)	(Team Sky)
Jersey awarded to the youth classification winner	Youth	Kenny Elissonde (FRA)	(FDJ)
	Team	BMC Racing Team	

The 2013 Tour of Oman was the fourth edition of the Tour of Oman cycling stage race. It was rated as a 2.HC event on the UCI Asia Tour, and was held from 11 to 16 February 2013, in Oman.

The race was won by Britain's Chris Froome, of Team Sky. Froome's winning margin over runner-up Alberto Contador (Saxo–Tinkoff) was 27 seconds, and Australian Cadel Evans (BMC Racing Team) completed the podium, twelve seconds behind Contador and 39 seconds down on Froome. In the race's other classifications, Froome also won the points classification, France's Kenny Elissonde of FDJ won the white jersey for the youth classification, by placing eighth overall in the general classification, and BMC Racing Team finished at the head of the teams classification.

== Teams ==
Eighteen teams competed in the 2013 Tour of Oman. These included twelve UCI ProTour teams, five UCI Professional Continental teams, and a national team representing Japan.

The teams that participated in the race were:

- Ag2r–La Mondiale
- Argos–Shimano
- Astana
- BMC Racing Team
- Cannondale
- FDJ
- Omega Pharma–Quick-Step
- Orica–GreenEDGE
- RadioShack–Leopard
- Saxo–Tinkoff
- Team Sky
- Vacansoleil–DCM
- Bardiani Valvole–CSF Inox
- Champion System
- IAM Cycling
- Team Katusha
- NetApp–Endura
- Japan (national team)

== Race overview ==
Stage	Date	Course	Distance	Type	Winner
1	11 February	Al Musannah to Sultan Qaboos University	162 km (100.7 mi)	Flat stage	Marcel Kittel (GER)
2	12 February	Fanja in Bidbid to Al Bustan	146 km (90.7 mi)	Medium-mountain stage	Peter Sagan (SVK)
3	13 February	Nakhal Fort to Wadi Dayqah Dam	190 km (118.1 mi)	Medium-mountain stage	Peter Sagan (SVK)
4	14 February	Al Saltiyah in Samail to Jabal Al Akhdhar	152.5 km (94.8 mi)	Mountain stage	Joaquim Rodríguez (ESP)
5	15 February	Al Alam Palace to Ministry of Housing in Boshar	144 km (89.5 mi)	Medium-mountain stage	Chris Froome (GBR)
6	16 February	Hawit Nagam Park to Matrah Corniche	144 km (89.5 mi)	Flat stage	Nacer Bouhanni (FRA)

== Stages ==
=== Stage 1 ===
11 February 2013 – Al Musannah to Sultan Qaboos University, 162 km (100.7 mi)

Stage 1 Result

	Rider	Team	Time
1	Marcel Kittel (GER)	Argos–Shimano	4h 04' 59"
2	Davide Appollonio (ITA)	Ag2r–La Mondiale	s.t.
3	Nacer Bouhanni (FRA)	FDJ	s.t.
4	Alexander Kristoff (NOR)	Team Katusha	s.t.
5	Tom Boonen (BEL)	Omega Pharma–Quick-Step	s.t.
6	Taylor Phinney (USA)	BMC Racing Team	s.t.
7	Filippo Fortin (ITA)	Bardiani Valvole–CSF Inox	s.t.
8	Kristof Goddaert (BEL)	IAM Cycling	s.t.
9	Elia Viviani (ITA)	Cannondale	s.t.
10	Jacopo Guarnieri (ITA)	Astana	s.t.

General Classification after Stage 1

	Rider	Team	Time
1	Marcel Kittel (GER)	Argos–Shimano	4h 04' 49"
2	Davide Appollonio (ITA)	Ag2r–La Mondiale	+ 4"
3	Bobbie Traksel (NED)	Champion System	+ 4"
4	Nacer Bouhanni (FRA)	FDJ	+ 6"
5	Dominique Rollin (CAN)	FDJ	+ 9"
6	Sonny Colbrelli (ITA)	Bardiani Valvole–CSF Inox	+ 9"
7	Alexander Kristoff (NOR)	Team Katusha	+ 10"
8	Tom Boonen (BEL)	Omega Pharma–Quick-Step	+ 10"
9	Taylor Phinney (USA)	BMC Racing Team	+ 10"
10	Filippo Fortin (ITA)	Bardiani Valvole–CSF Inox	+ 10"

=== Stage 2 ===
12 February 2013 – Fanja in Bidbid to Al Bustan, 146 km (90.7 mi)

Stage 2 Result

	Rider	Team	Time
1	Peter Sagan (SVK)	Cannondale	3h 48' 36"
2	Tony Gallopin (FRA)	RadioShack–Leopard	+ 5"
3	Martin Elmiger (SUI)	Champion System	+ 5"
4	Vincenzo Nibali (ITA)	Astana	+ 5"
5	Zdeněk Štybar (CZE)	Omega Pharma–Quick-Step	+ 7"
6	Chris Froome (GBR)	Team Sky	+ 7"
7	Marco Bandiera (ITA)	IAM Cycling	+ 11"
8	Marco Marcato (ITA)	Vacansoleil–DCM	+ 11"
9	Daryl Impey (RSA)	Orica–GreenEDGE	+ 11"
10	Nacer Bouhanni (FRA)	FDJ	+ 11"

General Classification after Stage 2

	Rider	Team	Time
1	Peter Sagan (SVK)	Cannondale	7h 53' 25"
2	Tony Gallopin (FRA)	RadioShack–Leopard	+ 9"
3	Martin Elmiger (SUI)	Champion System	+ 11"
4	Vincenzo Nibali (ITA)	Astana	+ 15"
5	Nacer Bouhanni (FRA)	FDJ	+ 17"
6	Chris Froome (GBR)	Team Sky	+ 17"
7	Zdeněk Štybar (CZE)	Omega Pharma–Quick-Step	+ 17"
8	Stijn Vandenbergh (BEL)	Omega Pharma–Quick-Step	+ 21"
9	Marco Bandiera (ITA)	IAM Cycling	+ 21"
10	Peter Velits (SVK)	Omega Pharma–Quick-Step	+ 21"

=== Stage 3 ===
13 February 2013 – Nakhal Fort to Wadi Dayqah Dam, 190 km (118.1 mi)

Stage 3 Result

	Rider	Team	Time
1	Peter Sagan (SVK)	Cannondale	5h 06' 28"
2	Greg Van Avermaet (BEL)	BMC Racing Team	+ 1"
3	Tony Gallopin (FRA)	RadioShack–Leopard	+ 1"
4	Alberto Contador (ESP)	Saxo–Tinkoff	+ 1"
5	Marco Marcato (ITA)	Vacansoleil–DCM	+ 1"
6	Andrea Pasqualon (ITA)	Bardiani Valvole–CSF Inox	+ 4"
7	Philippe Gilbert (BEL)	BMC Racing Team	+ 4"
8	Rinaldo Nocentini (ITA)	Ag2r–La Mondiale	+ 4"
9	Peter Velits (SVK)	Omega Pharma–Quick-Step	+ 4"
10	Nacer Bouhanni (FRA)	FDJ	+ 4"

General Classification after Stage 3

	Rider	Team	Time
1	Peter Sagan (SVK)	Argos–Shimano	12h 59' 43"
2	Tony Gallopin (FRA)	RadioShack–Leopard	+ 16"
3	Greg Van Avermaet (BEL)	BMC Racing Team	+ 26"
4	Martin Elmiger (SUI)	IAM Cycling	+ 30"
5	Nacer Bouhanni (FRA)	FDJ	+ 31"
6	Marco Marcato (ITA)	Vacansoleil–DCM	+ 32"
7	Alberto Contador (ESP)	Saxo–Tinkoff	+ 32"
8	Vincenzo Nibali (ITA)	Astana	+ 33"
9	Peter Velits (SVK)	Omega Pharma–Quick-Step	+ 35"
10	Andrea Pasqualon (ITA)	Bardiani Valvole–CSF Inox	+ 35"

=== Stage 4 ===
14 February 2013 – Al Saltiyah in Samail to Jabal Al Akhdhar, 152.5 km (94.8 mi)

Stage 4 Result

	Rider	Team	Time
1	Joaquim Rodríguez (ESP)	Team Katusha	3h 34' 48"
2	Chris Froome (GBR)	Team Sky	+ 4"
3	Cadel Evans (AUS)	BMC Racing Team	+ 22"
4	Alberto Contador (ESP)	Saxo–Tinkoff	+ 27"
5	Vincenzo Nibali (ITA)	Astana	+ 35"
6	Kenny Elissonde (FRA)	FDJ	+ 43"
7	Johann Tschopp (SUI)	IAM Cycling	+ 52"
8	Rinaldo Nocentini (ITA)	Ag2r–La Mondiale	+ 57"
9	Arnold Jeannesson (FRA)	FDJ	+ 1' 01"
10	Yannick Eijssen (BEL)	BMC Racing Team	+ 1' 09"

General Classification after Stage 4

	Rider	Team	Time
1	Chris Froome (GBR)	Team Sky	16h 35' 05"
2	Cadel Evans (AUS)	BMC Racing Team	+ 24"
3	Alberto Contador (ESP)	Saxo–Tinkoff	+ 25"
4	Vincenzo Nibali (ITA)	Astana	+ 34"
5	Joaquim Rodríguez (ESP)	Team Katusha	+ 45"
6	Kenny Elissonde (FRA)	FDJ	+ 49"
7	Rinaldo Nocentini (ITA)	Ag2r–La Mondiale	+ 58"
8	Johann Tschopp (SUI)	IAM Cycling	+ 58"
9	Maxime Bouet (FRA)	Ag2r–La Mondiale	+ 1' 15"
10	Arnold Jeannesson (FRA)	FDJ	+ 1' 23"

=== Stage 5 ===
15 February 2013 – Al Alam Palace to Ministry of Housing in Boshar, 144 km (89.5 mi)

Stage 5 Result

	Rider	Team	Time
1	Chris Froome (GBR)	Team Sky	3h 34' 48"
2	Alberto Contador (ESP)	Saxo–Tinkoff	s.t.
3	Joaquim Rodríguez (ESP)	Team Katusha	s.t.
4	Daryl Impey (RSA)	Orica–GreenEDGE	+ 4"
5	Zdeněk Štybar (CZE)	Omega Pharma–Quick-Step	+ 4"
6	Rinaldo Nocentini (ITA)	Ag2r–La Mondiale	+ 4"
7	Johann Tschopp (SUI)	IAM Cycling	+ 4"
8	Cadel Evans (AUS)	BMC Racing Team	+ 4"
9	Jesús Hernández (ESP)	Saxo–Tinkoff	+ 4"
10	Domenico Pozzovivo (ITA)	Ag2r–La Mondiale	+ 8"

General Classification after Stage 5

	Rider	Team	Time
1	Chris Froome (GBR)	Team Sky	20h 04' 13"
2	Alberto Contador (ESP)	Saxo–Tinkoff	+ 27"
3	Cadel Evans (AUS)	BMC Racing Team	+ 39"
4	Joaquim Rodríguez (ESP)	Team Katusha	+ 50"
5	Rinaldo Nocentini (ITA)	Ag2r–La Mondiale	+ 1' 13"
6	Johann Tschopp (SUI)	IAM Cycling	+ 1' 13"
7	Vincenzo Nibali (ITA)	Astana	+ 1' 19"
8	Kenny Elissonde (FRA)	FDJ	+ 1' 34"
9	Domenico Pozzovivo (ITA)	Ag2r–La Mondiale	+ 1' 44"
10	Maxime Bouet (FRA)	Ag2r–La Mondiale	+ 2' 00"

=== Stage 6 ===
16 February 2013 – Hawit Nagam Park to Matrah Corniche, 144 km (89.5 mi)

Stage 6 Result

	Rider	Team	Time
1	Nacer Bouhanni (FRA)	FDJ	3h 24' 20"
2	Matthew Goss (AUS)	Orica–GreenEDGE	s.t.
3	Taylor Phinney (USA)	BMC Racing Team	s.t.
4	Elia Viviani (ITA)	Cannondale	s.t.
5	Borut Božič (SLO)	Astana	s.t.
6	Daryl Impey (RSA)	Orica–GreenEDGE	s.t.
7	Tom Boonen (BEL)	Omega Pharma–Quick-Step	s.t.
8	Danny van Poppel (NED)	Vacansoleil–DCM	s.t.
9	Blaž Jarc (SLO)	NetApp–Endura	s.t.
10	Marco Coledan (ITA)	Bardiani Valvole–CSF Inox	s.t.

Final General Classification

	Rider	Team	Time
1	Chris Froome (GBR)	Team Sky	23h 28' 33"
2	Alberto Contador (ESP)	Saxo–Tinkoff	+ 27"
3	Cadel Evans (AUS)	BMC Racing Team	+ 39"
4	Joaquim Rodríguez (ESP)	Team Katusha	+ 50"
5	Rinaldo Nocentini (ITA)	Ag2r–La Mondiale	+ 1' 13"
6	Johann Tschopp (SUI)	IAM Cycling	+ 1' 13"
7	Vincenzo Nibali (ITA)	Astana	+ 1' 19"
8	Kenny Elissonde (FRA)	FDJ	+ 1' 34"
9	Domenico Pozzovivo (ITA)	Ag2r–La Mondiale	+ 1' 44"
10	Maxime Bouet (FRA)	Ag2r–La Mondiale	+ 1' 57"

== Classification leadership ==
Stage	Winner	General Classification	Points Classification	Young Rider Classification	Combative Cyclist Classification	Teams Classification
1	Marcel Kittel	Marcel Kittel	Marcel Kittel	Marcel Kittel	Bobbie Traksel	Bardiani Valvole-CSF Inox
2	Peter Sagan	Peter Sagan	Marcel Kittel	Peter Sagan	Bobbie Traksel	Cannondale
3	Peter Sagan	Peter Sagan	Peter Sagan	Peter Sagan	Bobbie Traksel	BMC Racing Team
4	Joaquim Rodríguez	Chris Froome	Peter Sagan	Kenny Elissonde	Bobbie Traksel	BMC Racing Team
5	Chris Froome	Chris Froome	Chris Froome	Kenny Elissonde	Bobbie Traksel	BMC Racing Team
6	Nacer Bouhanni	Chris Froome	Chris Froome	Kenny Elissonde	Bobbie Traksel	BMC Racing Team
Final		Chris Froome	Chris Froome	Kenny Elissonde	Bobbie Traksel	BMC Racing Team
