= 2014 Tour of Oman =

Race details
- Dates: 18–23 February
- Stages: 6
- Distance: 915.5 km (568.9 mi)
- Winning time: 22h 02' 26"

Results
Jersey awarded to the overall winner	Winner	Chris Froome (Great Britain)	(Team Sky)
	Second	Tejay van Garderen (United States)	(BMC Racing Team)
	Third	Rigoberto Urán (Colombia)	(Omega Pharma–Quick-Step)
Jersey awarded to the points classification winner	Points	André Greipel (Germany)	(Lotto–Belisol)
Jersey awarded to the young rider classification winner	Young rider	Romain Bardet (France)	(Ag2r–La Mondiale)
	Team	Team Sky	

The 2014 Tour of Oman was the fifth edition of the Tour of Oman cycling stage race. It was rated as a 2.HC event on the UCI Asia Tour, and was held from 18 to 23 February 2014, in Oman.

For the second year in a row, the race was won by Team Sky rider Chris Froome – becoming its first repeat winner – after he won the queen stage of the race, to Jebel Akhdar, on the penultimate day and held the race leader's red jersey to the finish, the next day, at the Matrah Corniche. Froome's winning margin over runner-up Tejay van Garderen of the BMC Racing Team was 26 seconds, and Omega Pharma–Quick-Step's Rigoberto Urán completed the podium, 5 seconds down on van Garderen and 31 seconds in arrears of Froome.

In the race's other classifications, André Greipel won the points classification for Lotto–Belisol, after winning three stages during the race, while the young rider classification was won by Romain Bardet (Ag2r–La Mondiale), as he was the best placed rider under the age of 25, in thirteenth overall. The combative classification – to which points from mountains and sprints were awarded towards – was won by Preben Van Hecke of the Topsport Vlaanderen–Baloise team, while Team Sky won the teams classification, after also placing Sergio Henao inside the top ten overall, as well as Froome.

== Teams ==
Eighteen teams competed in the 2014 Tour of Oman. These included thirteen UCI World Tour teams and five UCI Professional Continental teams.

The teams that participated in the race were:

- Ag2r–La Mondiale
- Astana
- Bardiani–CSF
- Belkin Pro Cycling
- BMC Racing Team
- Cannondale
- FDJ.fr
- IAM Cycling
- Team Katusha
- Lotto–Belisol
- NetApp–Endura
- Omega Pharma–Quick-Step
- Orica–GreenEDGE
- Team Sky
- Tinkoff–Saxo
- Topsport Vlaanderen–Baloise
- Trek Factory Racing
- UnitedHealthcare

== Stages ==
=== Stage 1 ===
18 February 2014 — As Suwayq Castle to Naseem Garden, 164.5 km (102.2 mi)

Stage 1 Result

	Rider	Team	Time
1	André Greipel (GER)	Lotto–Belisol	4h 03' 31"
2	Leigh Howard (AUS)	Orica–GreenEDGE	s.t.
3	Nicola Ruffoni (ITA)	Bardiani–CSF	s.t.
4	Nacer Bouhanni (FRA)	FDJ.fr	s.t.
5	Tom Boonen (BEL)	Omega Pharma–Quick-Step	s.t.
6	Michael Van Staeyen (BEL)	Topsport Vlaanderen–Baloise	s.t.
7	Barry Markus (NED)	Belkin Pro Cycling	s.t.
8	Steve Chainel (FRA)	Ag2r–La Mondiale	s.t.
9	Alexander Kristoff (NOR)	Team Katusha	s.t.
10	Borut Božič (SLO)	Astana	s.t.

General Classification after Stage 1

	Rider	Team	Time
1	André Greipel (GER)	Lotto–Belisol	4h 03' 21"
2	Leigh Howard (AUS)	Orica–GreenEDGE	+ 4"
3	Nicola Ruffoni (ITA)	Bardiani–CSF	+ 6"
4	Preben Van Hecke (BEL)	Topsport Vlaanderen–Baloise	+ 6"
5	Niki Terpstra (NED)	Omega Pharma–Quick-Step	+ 7"
6	Nicola Boem (ITA)	Bardiani–CSF	+ 7"
7	Stijn Devolder (BEL)	Trek Factory Racing	+ 9"
8	Alessandro Bazzana (ITA)	UnitedHealthcare	+ 9"
9	Nacer Bouhanni (FRA)	FDJ.fr	+ 10"
10	Tom Boonen (BEL)	Omega Pharma–Quick-Step	+ 10"

=== Stage 2 ===
19 February 2014 — Al Bustan to Quriyat, 139 km (86.4 mi)

Stage 2 Result

	Rider	Team	Time
1	Alexander Kristoff (NOR)	Team Katusha	3h 12' 01"
2	Leigh Howard (AUS)	Orica–GreenEDGE	s.t.
3	Tom Boonen (BEL)	Omega Pharma–Quick-Step	s.t.
4	Robert Förster (GER)	UnitedHealthcare	s.t.
5	Nacer Bouhanni (FRA)	FDJ.fr	s.t.
6	Nicola Ruffoni (ITA)	Bardiani–CSF	s.t.
7	Pieter Vanspeybrouck (BEL)	Topsport Vlaanderen–Baloise	s.t.
8	Marcus Burghardt (GER)	BMC Racing Team	s.t.
9	Matteo Trentin (ITA)	Omega Pharma–Quick-Step	s.t.
10	Sam Bennett (IRL)	NetApp–Endura	s.t.

General Classification after Stage 2

	Rider	Team	Time
1	Leigh Howard (AUS)	Orica–GreenEDGE	7h 15' 20"
2	Alexander Kristoff (NOR)	Team Katusha	+ 2"
3	André Greipel (GER)	Lotto–Belisol	+ 2"
4	Preben Van Hecke (BEL)	Topsport Vlaanderen–Baloise	+ 2"
5	Tom Boonen (BEL)	Omega Pharma–Quick-Step	+ 8"
6	Nicola Ruffoni (ITA)	Bardiani–CSF	+ 8"
7	Paolo Colonna (ITA)	Bardiani–CSF	+ 8"
8	Nicola Boem (ITA)	Bardiani–CSF	+ 9"
9	Tony Gallopin (FRA)	Lotto–Belisol	+ 11"
10	Stijn Devolder (BEL)	Trek Factory Racing	+ 11"

=== Stage 3 ===
20 February 2014 — BankMuscat to Al Bustan, 145 km (90.1 mi)

Stage 3 Result

	Rider	Team	Time
1	André Greipel (GER)	Lotto–Belisol	3h 29' 08"
2	Peter Sagan (SVK)	Cannondale	s.t.
3	Nacer Bouhanni (FRA)	FDJ.fr	s.t.
4	Ben Swift (GBR)	Team Sky	s.t.
5	Marco Canola (ITA)	Bardiani–CSF	s.t.
6	Zdeněk Štybar (CZE)	Omega Pharma–Quick-Step	s.t.
7	Francesco Gavazzi (ITA)	Astana	s.t.
8	Zak Dempster (AUS)	NetApp–Endura	s.t.
9	Matteo Trentin (ITA)	Omega Pharma–Quick-Step	s.t.
10	Enrico Battaglin (ITA)	Bardiani–CSF	s.t.

General Classification after Stage 3

	Rider	Team	Time
1	André Greipel (GER)	Lotto–Belisol	10h 44' 20"
2	Leigh Howard (AUS)	Orica–GreenEDGE	+ 8"
3	Alexander Kristoff (NOR)	Team Katusha	+ 10"
4	Peter Sagan (SVK)	Cannondale	+ 14"
5	Nacer Bouhanni (FRA)	FDJ.fr	+ 16"
6	Tom Boonen (BEL)	Omega Pharma–Quick-Step	+ 16"
7	Tony Gallopin (FRA)	Lotto–Belisol	+ 19"
8	Alessandro Bazzana (ITA)	UnitedHealthcare	+ 19"
9	Ben Swift (GBR)	Team Sky	+ 20"
10	Daniele Bennati (ITA)	Tinkoff–Saxo	+ 20"

=== Stage 4 ===
21 February 2014 — Wadi Al Abiyad to Ministry of Housing, 173 km (107.5 mi)

Stage 4 Result

	Rider	Team	Time
1	Peter Sagan (SVK)	Cannondale	4h 02' 20"
2	Rigoberto Urán (COL)	Omega Pharma–Quick-Step	s.t.
3	Vincenzo Nibali (ITA)	Astana	+ 2"
4	Daryl Impey (RSA)	Orica–GreenEDGE	+ 2"
5	Tony Gallopin (FRA)	Lotto–Belisol	+ 2"
6	Daniel Moreno (ESP)	Team Katusha	+ 2"
7	Francesco Gavazzi (ITA)	Astana	+ 2"
8	Zdeněk Štybar (CZE)	Omega Pharma–Quick-Step	+ 2"
9	Thomas Löfkvist (SWE)	IAM Cycling	+ 2"
10	Moreno Moser (ITA)	Cannondale	+ 2"

General Classification after Stage 4

	Rider	Team	Time
1	Peter Sagan (SVK)	Cannondale	14h 46' 44"
2	Rigoberto Urán (COL)	Omega Pharma–Quick-Step	+ 10"
3	Vincenzo Nibali (ITA)	Astana	+ 14"
4	Tony Gallopin (FRA)	Lotto–Belisol	+ 17"
5	Daryl Impey (RSA)	Orica–GreenEDGE	+ 18"
6	Francesco Gavazzi (ITA)	Astana	+ 18"
7	Roman Kreuziger (CZE)	Tinkoff–Saxo	+ 18"
8	Chris Froome (GBR)	Team Sky	+ 18"
9	Tejay van Garderen (USA)	BMC Racing Team	+ 18"
10	Robert Gesink (NED)	Belkin Pro Cycling	+ 18"

=== Stage 5 ===
22 February 2014 — Bidbid to Jabal al Akhdar, 147.5 km (91.7 mi)

Stage 5 Result

	Rider	Team	Time
1	Chris Froome (GBR)	Team Sky	3h 49' 53"
2	Tejay van Garderen (USA)	BMC Racing Team	+ 22"
3	Rigoberto Urán (COL)	Omega Pharma–Quick-Step	+ 33"
4	Joaquim Rodríguez (ESP)	Team Katusha	+ 38"
5	Robert Gesink (NED)	Belkin Pro Cycling	+ 47"
6	Domenico Pozzovivo (ITA)	Ag2r–La Mondiale	+ 51"
7	Arnold Jeannesson (FRA)	FDJ.fr	+ 56"
8	Romain Bardet (FRA)	Ag2r–La Mondiale	+ 59"
9	Sergio Henao (COL)	Team Sky	+ 1' 09"
10	Roman Kreuziger (CZE)	Tinkoff–Saxo	+ 1' 15"

General Classification after Stage 5

	Rider	Team	Time
1	Chris Froome (GBR)	Team Sky	18h 36' 45"
2	Tejay van Garderen (USA)	BMC Racing Team	+ 26"
3	Rigoberto Urán (COL)	Omega Pharma–Quick-Step	+ 31"
4	Joaquim Rodríguez (ESP)	Team Katusha	+ 48"
5	Robert Gesink (NED)	Belkin Pro Cycling	+ 57"
6	Domenico Pozzovivo (ITA)	Ag2r–La Mondiale	+ 1' 01"
7	Sergio Henao (COL)	Team Sky	+ 1' 19"
8	Roman Kreuziger (CZE)	Tinkoff–Saxo	+ 1' 25"
9	Johann Tschopp (SUI)	IAM Cycling	+ 1' 32"
10	Daniel Moreno (ESP)	Team Katusha	+ 1' 34"

=== Stage 6 ===
23 February 2014 — As Sifah to Matrah Corniche, 146.5 km (91.0 mi)

Stage 6 Result

	Rider	Team	Time
1	André Greipel (GER)	Lotto–Belisol	3h 25' 41"
2	Nacer Bouhanni (FRA)	FDJ.fr	s.t.
3	Sam Bennett (IRL)	NetApp–Endura	s.t.
4	Alexander Kristoff (NOR)	Team Katusha	s.t.
5	Michael Mørkøv (DEN)	Tinkoff–Saxo	s.t.
6	Filippo Fortin (ITA)	Bardiani–CSF	s.t.
7	Matteo Trentin (ITA)	Omega Pharma–Quick-Step	s.t.
8	Jens Keukeleire (BEL)	Orica–GreenEDGE	s.t.
9	Borut Božič (SLO)	Astana	s.t.
10	Peter Sagan (SVK)	Cannondale	s.t.

Final General Classification

	Rider	Team	Time
1	Chris Froome (GBR)	Team Sky	22h 02' 26"
2	Tejay van Garderen (USA)	BMC Racing Team	+ 26"
3	Rigoberto Urán (COL)	Omega Pharma–Quick-Step	+ 31"
4	Joaquim Rodríguez (ESP)	Team Katusha	+ 48"
5	Robert Gesink (NED)	Belkin Pro Cycling	+ 57"
6	Domenico Pozzovivo (ITA)	Ag2r–La Mondiale	+ 1' 01"
7	Sergio Henao (COL)	Team Sky	+ 1' 19"
8	Roman Kreuziger (CZE)	Tinkoff–Saxo	+ 1' 25"
9	Johann Tschopp (SUI)	IAM Cycling	+ 1' 32"
10	Daniel Moreno (ESP)	Team Katusha	+ 1' 34"

== Classification leadership table ==
Stage	Winner	General classification	Points classification	Young rider classification	Combative classification	Teams classification
1	André Greipel	André Greipel	André Greipel	Leigh Howard	Preben Van Hecke	Topsport Vlaanderen–Baloise
2	Alexander Kristoff	Leigh Howard	Leigh Howard	Leigh Howard	Preben Van Hecke	Topsport Vlaanderen–Baloise
3	André Greipel	André Greipel	André Greipel	Leigh Howard	Preben Van Hecke	Omega Pharma–Quick-Step
4	Peter Sagan	Peter Sagan	André Greipel	Peter Sagan	Jelle Wallays	Orica–GreenEDGE
5	Chris Froome	Chris Froome	André Greipel	Romain Bardet	Preben Van Hecke	Team Sky
6	André Greipel	Chris Froome	André Greipel	Romain Bardet	Preben Van Hecke	Team Sky
Final		Chris Froome	André Greipel	Romain Bardet	Preben Van Hecke	Team Sky
