= 2010 Tour of Oman =

Race details
- Dates: 14–19 February
- Stages: 6
- Distance: 687.1 km (426.9 mi)
- Winning time: 16h 02' 52"

Results
Jersey awarded to the overall winner	Winner	Fabian Cancellara (SUI)	(Team Saxo Bank)
	Second	Edvald Boasson Hagen (NOR)	(Team Sky)
	Third	Cameron Meyer (AUS)	(Garmin–Transitions)
Jersey awarded to the points classification winner	Points	Edvald Boasson Hagen (NOR)	(Team Sky)
Jersey awarded to the young rider classification winner	Young rider	Edvald Boasson Hagen (NOR)	(Team Sky)
	Team	Team HTC–Columbia	

The 2010 Tour of Oman was the first edition of the Tour of Oman cycling stage race. It was rated as a 2.1 event on the UCI Asia Tour, and held from 14 February to 19 February 2010, in Oman. The race was won by Fabian Cancellara of Team Saxo Bank.

== Teams ==
Sixteen teams competed. These included ten UCI ProTour teams, five UCI Professional Continental teams, and one Continental team. Each team entered a squad of eight riders, giving the Tour a peloton of 128 riders.

The teams that participated in the race were:

- Ag2r–La Mondiale
- BMC Racing Team
- Cervélo TestTeam
- Garmin–Transitions
- Liquigas–Doimo
- Omega Pharma–Lotto
- Quick-Step
- Saur–Sojasun
- Team HTC–Columbia
- Team Katusha
- Team Milram
- Team Saxo Bank
- Team Sky
- Trek-Livestrong U23
- Topsport Vlaanderen–Mercator
- Vacansoleil

== Stages ==
=== Stage 1 ===
14 February 2010 – Muscat Corniche, 61 km (37.9 mi)

The Frenchman Jimmy Casper outsprinted the peloton.

The first stage was a night time stage along a 16 lap course in Muscat Corniche. This night racing made the first couple of laps cautious because the riders had to race without headlights and did not want to risk an accident.

Stage 1 results

	Cyclist	Team	Time
1	Jimmy Casper (FRA)	Saur-Sojasun	1h 22' 12"
2	Edvald Boasson Hagen (NOR)	Team Sky	st.
3	Kenny Dehaes (BEL)	Omega Pharma–Lotto	st.
4	Tyler Farrar (USA)	Garmin–Transitions	st.
5	Francesco Chicchi (ITA)	Liquigas–Doimo	st.
6	Michael Van Staeyen (BEL)	Topsport Vlaanderen–Mercator	st.
7	Danilo Napolitano (ITA)	Team Katusha	st.
8	Bernhard Eisel (AUT)	Team HTC–Columbia	st.
9	Andreas Stauff (GER)	Quick-Step	st.
10	Lucas Sebastian Haedo (ARG)	Team Saxo Bank	st.

General Classification after Stage 1

	Cyclist	Team	Time
1	Jimmy Casper (FRA)	Saur-Sojasun	1h 22' 12"
2	Edvald Boasson Hagen (NOR)	Team Sky	+ 4"
3	Kenny Dehaes (BEL)	Omega Pharma–Lotto	+ 6"
4	Tyler Farrar (USA)	Garmin–Transitions	+10"
5	Francesco Chicchi (ITA)	Liquigas–Doimo	+10"
6	Michael Van Staeyen (BEL)	Topsport Vlaanderen–Mercator	+10"
7	Danilo Napolitano (ITA)	Team Katusha	+10"
8	Bernhard Eisel (AUT)	Team HTC–Columbia	+10"
9	Andreas Stauff (GER)	Quick-Step	+10"
10	Lucas Sebastian Haedo (ARG)	Team Saxo Bank	+10"

=== Stage 2 ===
15 February 2010 – Nizwa to Samail, 148.5 km (92.3 mi)

Daniele Bennati won the stage in a sprint finish. It was his first victory since February 28, 2009. He outsprinted American sprinter Tyler Farrar and Norway's Edvald Boasson Hagen to get the victory. He dedicated the race to Franco Ballerini, an Italian cyclist who died February 7, 2010.

In the Tour of Qatar Daniele Bennati helped out his teammate Francesco Chicchi but this race was the reverse. With no one making a move with 300m to go, Bennati jumped and had enough speed to hold off the other sprinters. He credited his teammates Francesco Chicchi and Daniel Oss for giving him a great lead out. This victory put Bennati in a comfortable 3rd position overall with the same time as the leader.

The three riders tied for first were (in order) Hagen, Casper, and Bennati.

Stage 2 results

	Cyclist	Team	Time
1	Daniele Bennati (ITA)	Liquigas–Doimo	3h 33' 03"
2	Tyler Farrar (USA)	Garmin–Transitions	st.
3	Edvald Boasson Hagen (NOR)	Team Sky	st.
4	Matti Breschel (DEN)	Team Saxo Bank	st.
5	Danilo Napolitano (ITA)	Team Katusha	st.
6	Andreas Klier (GER)	Cervélo TestTeam	st.
7	Roger Hammond (GBR)	Cervélo TestTeam	st.
8	Bernhard Eisel (AUT)	Team HTC–Columbia	st.
9	Romain Feillu (FRA)	Vacansoleil	st.
10	Jimmy Casper (FRA)	Saur-Sojasun	st.

General Classification after Stage 2

	Cyclist	Team	Time
1	Edvald Boasson Hagen (NOR)	Team Sky	4h 55' 15"
2	Jimmy Casper (FRA)	Saur-Sojasun	st.
3	Daniele Bennati (ITA)	Liquigas–Doimo	st.
4	Tyler Farrar (USA)	Garmin–Transitions	+ 4"
5	Kenny Dehaes (BEL)	Omega Pharma–Lotto	+ 6"
6	Kristof Vandewalle (BEL)	Topsport Vlaanderen–Mercator	+ 6"
7	Ben Gastauer (NED)	Ag2r–La Mondiale	+ 7"
8	Alex Dowsett (GBR)	Trek Livestrong U23	+ 8"
9	Danilo Napolitano (ITA)	Team Katusha	+ 10"
10	Bernhard Eisel (AUT)	Team HTC–Columbia	+ 10"

=== Stage 3 ===
16 February 2010 – Saifat Ash Shiekh to Qurayyat, 124 km (77.1 mi)

Team Sky's Hagen confirmed that he was the big favourite to win the first edition of the Tour of Oman by winning Tuesday's third stage to Qurayyat and extending his overall lead.

The 22-year-old Norwegian got a perfect leadout from his teammates, responded to a late surge by the Garmin–Transitions team and then accelerated to the line to win with his arms waving in celebration. Team Katusha's Danilo Napolitano was 2nd and Tyler Farrar was 3rd.

The 10 second time bonus won in the stage put him 10 seconds ahead of Tyler Farrar. who was in 2nd place.

Stage 3 results

	Cyclist	Team	Time
1	Edvald Boasson Hagen (NOR)	Team Sky	3h 05' 49"
2	Danilo Napolitano (ITA)	Team Katusha	st.
3	Tyler Farrar (USA)	Garmin–Transitions	st.
4	Tom Boonen (BEL)	Quick-Step	st.
5	Stuart O'Grady (AUS)	Team Saxo Bank	st.
6	Lloyd Mondory (FRA)	Ag2r–La Mondiale	st.
7	Peter Wrolich (AUT)	Team Milram	st.
8	Romain Feillu (FRA)	Vacansoleil	st.
9	Klaas Lodewijck (BEL)	Topsport Vlaanderen–Mercator	st.
10	Bernhard Eisel (AUT)	Team HTC–Columbia	st.

General Classification after Stage 3

	Cyclist	Team	Time
1	Edvald Boasson Hagen (NOR)	Team Sky	8h 00' 54"
2	Tyler Farrar (USA)	Garmin–Transitions	+ 10"
3	Daniele Bennati (ITA)	Liquigas–Doimo	+ 10"
4	Danilo Napolitano (ITA)	Team Katusha	+ 14"
5	Gatis Smukulis (LAT)	Omega Pharma–Lotto	+ 15"
6	Lieuwe Westra (NED)	Vacansoleil	+ 16"
7	Kristof Vandewalle (BEL)	Topsport Vlaanderen–Mercator	+ 16"
8	Ben Gastauer (LUX)	Ag2r–La Mondiale	+ 17"
9	Bernhard Eisel (AUT)	Team HTC–Columbia	+ 20"
10	Michael Van Staeyen (BEL)	Topsport Vlaanderen–Mercator	+ 20"

=== Stage 4 ===
17 February 2010 – Ibri to Nakhal, 187 km (116.2 mi)

The Tour of Oman exploded during the toughest stage of the race on Wednesday as Team Sky and the rest of the peloton swapped below the belt punches during the race and then accusations on unfair play after the finish. Australia's Leigh Howard won the stage with a fine sprint on the slightly uphill finish.

Team Sky riders let a six-rider break gain almost seven minutes in the first hour and then were angry when no other teams were willing to help them chase the break.

Several riders claimed that the Team Sky riders vented their anger on the peloton by blasting through the feed zone and then put the peloton in the gutter by riding a half-road echelon when the wind changed direction.

That especially angered Cervélo TestTeam, who retaliated by splitting the race when Hagen stopped to urinate 55 km from the finish. Because he was race leader, Hagen had perhaps thought the peloton would wait for him, but in the heat of battle, nobody did and 41 riders group quickly formed an echelon and accelerated up the road. Hagen never caught up to the peloton and as a result finished 1'05" behind Leigh Howard in 34th position.

Stage 4 results

	Cyclist	Team	Time
1	Leigh Howard (AUS)	Team HTC–Columbia	4h 11' 31"
2	Daniele Bennati (ITA)	Liquigas–Doimo	st.
3	Tom Boonen (BEL)	Quick-Step	st.
4	Roger Hammond (GBR)	Cervélo TestTeam	st.
5	Tyler Farrar (USA)	Garmin–Transitions	st.
6	Stijn Vandenbergh (BEL)	Team Katusha	st.
7	Sébastien Hinault (FRA)	Ag2r–La Mondiale	st.
8	Marcus Burghardt (GER)	BMC Racing Team	st.
9	Michael Schär (SWI)	BMC Racing Team	st.
10	Robert Hunter (RSA)	Garmin–Transitions	st.

General Classification after Stage 4

	Cyclist	Team	Time
1	Daniele Bennati (ITA)	Team Sky	12h 12' 29"
2	Tyler Farrar (USA)	Garmin–Transitions	+ 6"
3	Gatis Smukulis (LAT)	Ag2r–La Mondiale	+ 6"
4	Leigh Howard (AUS)	Team HTC–Columbia	+ 6"
5	Nikolay Trusov (RUS)	Team Katusha	+ 11"
6	Tom Boonen (BEL)	Quick-Step	+ 12"
7	Cyril Lemoine (FRA)	Saur-Sojasun	+ 14"
8	Bernhard Eisel (AUT)	Team HTC–Columbia	+ 16"
9	Sébastien Hinault (FRA)	Ag2r–La Mondiale	+ 16"
10	Roger Hammond (GBR)	Cervélo TestTeam	+ 16"

=== Stage 5 ===
18 February 2010 – Wattayat to Sultan Qaboos Stadium, 146 km (90.7 mi)

Quick-Step's Tom Boonen took his third win in 11 days of racing in the Gulf, winning a hectic sprint at the end of stage five of the Tour of Oman. Boonen won two stages in the Tour of Qatar and seemed back to his very best.

Boonen got an excellent leadout from his teammates and then dug deep to find an extra bit of speed to beat Team Saxo Bank's Juan Jose Haedo.

The win put Boonen 2 seconds behind the overall leader Bennati.

After five days of racing, 26 riders were within 16 seconds in the overall standings and so Friday's 18.5 km time trial decided the winner.

Stage 5 results

	Cyclist	Team	Time
1	Tom Boonen (BEL)	Quick-Step	3h 23' 52"
2	Juan Jose Haedo (ARG)	Team Saxo Bank	st.
3	Michael Van Staeyen (BEL)	Topsport Vlaanderen–Mercator	st.
4	Baden Cooke (AUS)	Team Saxo Bank	st.
5	Tyler Farrar (USA)	Garmin–Transitions	st.
6	Edvald Boasson Hagen (NOR)	Team Sky	st.
7	Daniele Bennati (ITA)	Liquigas–Doimo	st.
8	Roger Kluge (GER)	Team Milram	st.
9	Dominique Rollin (CAN)	Cervélo TestTeam	st.
10	Klaas Lodewyck (BEL)	Topsport Vlaanderen–Mercator	st.

General Classification after Stage 5

	Cyclist	Team	Time
1	Daniele Bennati (ITA)	Liquigas–Doimo	15h 36' 21"
2	Tom Boonen (BEL)	Quick-Step	+ 2"
3	Tyler Farrar (USA)	Garmin–Transitions	+ 6"
4	Gatis Smukulis (LAT)	Ag2r–La Mondiale	+ 6"
5	Leigh Howard (AUS)	Team HTC–Columbia	+ 6"
6	Juan Jose Haedo (ARG)	Team Saxo Bank	+ 10"
7	Nikolay Trusov (RUS)	Team Katusha	+ 11"
8	Cyril Lemoine (FRA)	Saur-Sojasun	+ 14"
9	Roger Hammond (GBR)	Cervélo TestTeam	+ 16"
10	Sébastien Hinault (FRA)	Ag2r–La Mondiale	+ 16"

=== Stage 6 ===
19 February 2010 – Al Jissah to Muscat Corniche, 18.6 km (11.6 mi) (ITT)

Hagen of Team Sky won the 6th and final stage in the Tour of Oman, but time trialist Fabian Cancellara placed 2nd on the stage (17 seconds behind Edvald Boasson Hagen) which gave him the overall victory.

The win made Hagen the youth classifications winner, as well as the green jersey for the overall points winner. Hagen hit speeds of almost 100 km/h 100 km/h (62 mph) on the fast downhill section following the second climb and swept up the riders in front of him throughout his ride.

Cancellara revealed he would not race again until the Eroica in Tuscany in early March. His winter training was disrupted by illness in January but he afterward he was satisfied that he was back on schedule.

He was still some way from the Cancellara who could dominate Milan–San Remo, Paris–Roubaix, but he used his time trialing skills to come out on top. Cancellera was satisfied with his victory but admitted he was hurting very much and that there was a lot of room for improvement for the big races later in the season.

Stage 6 results

	Cyclist	Team	Time
1	Edvald Boasson Hagen (NOR)	Team Sky	25' 28"
2	Fabian Cancellara (SUI)	Team Saxo Bank	+ 17"
3	Cameron Meyer (AUS)	Garmin–Transitions	+ 45"
4	Marco Pinotti (ITA)	Team HTC–Columbia	+ 48"
5	Artem Ovechkin (RUS)	Team Katusha	+ 1' 01"
6	Niki Terpstra (NED)	Team Milram	+ 1' 11"
7	Greg Van Avermaet (BEL)	Omega Pharma–Lotto	+ 1' 19"
8	Marcus Burghardt (GER)	BMC Racing Team	st.
9	Geraint Thomas (GBR)	Team Sky	+ 1' 20"
10	Daniele Bennati (ITA)	Liquigas–Doimo	st.

Final General Classification

	Cyclist	Team	Time
1	Fabian Cancellara (SUI)	Team Saxo Bank	16h 02' 52"
2	Edvald Boasson Hagen (NOR)	Team Sky	+ 28"
3	Cameron Meyer (AUS)	Garmin–Transitions	st.
4	Marco Pinotti (ITA)	Team HTC–Columbia	+ 31"
5	Daniele Bennati (ITA)	Liquigas–Doimo	+ 47"
6	Niki Terpstra (NED)	Team Milram	+ 54"
7	Marcus Burghardt (GER)	BMC Racing Team	+ 1' 02"
8	Martin Velits (SVK)	Team HTC–Columbia	+ 1' 07"
9	Jurgen Van De Walle (BEL)	Quick-Step	+ 1' 12"
10	Daniel Oss (ITA)	Liquigas–Doimo	+ 1' 13"

== Classification leadership ==
Stage	Winner	General Classification	Points Classification	Young Rider Classification	Aggressive Cyclist Classification	Teams Classification
1	Jimmy Casper	Jimmy Casper	Jimmy Casper	Edvald Boasson Hagen	Marco Pinotti	Saur-Sojasun
2	Daniele Bennati	Edvald Boasson Hagen	Edvald Boasson Hagen	Edvald Boasson Hagen	Kristof Vandewalle	Team Saxo Bank
3	Edvald Boasson Hagen	Edvald Boasson Hagen	Edvald Boasson Hagen	Edvald Boasson Hagen	Gatis Smukulis	Garmin–Transitions
4	Leigh Howard	Daniele Bennati	Tyler Farrar	Gatis Smukulis	Gatis Smukulis	Garmin–Transitions
5	Tom Boonen	Daniele Bennati	Tyler Farrar	Gatis Smukulis	Gatis Smukulis	Team Saxo Bank
6	Edvald Boasson Hagen	Fabian Cancellara	Edvald Boasson Hagen	Edvald Boasson Hagen	Gatis Smukulis	Team HTC–Columbia
Final		Fabian Cancellara	Edvald Boasson Hagen	Edvald Boasson Hagen	Gatis Smukulis	Team HTC–Columbia

For Stage 2, Kenny De Haes wore the green jersey.

For Stages 3 and 4, Tyler Farrar wore the green jersey, and Kristof Vandewalle wore the white jersey.

For Stage 5, Leigh Howard wore the white jersey.
