= 2021 Tour de la Provence =

2021 UCI Europe Tour 2021 UCI ProSeries

Race details
- Dates: 11–14 February 2021
- Stages: 4
- Distance: 674.1 km (418.9 mi)
- Winning time: 17h 00' 17"

Results
| Jersey awarded to the overall winner | Winner | Iván Sosa (COL) | (INEOS Grenadiers) |
| | Second | Julian Alaphilippe (FRA) | (Deceuninck–Quick-Step) |
| | Third | Egan Bernal (COL) | (INEOS Grenadiers) |
| Jersey awarded to the points classification winner | Points | Davide Ballerini (ITA) | (Deceuninck–Quick-Step) |
| Jersey awarded to the mountains classification winner | Mountains | Filippo Conca (ITA) | (Lotto–Soudal) |
| Jersey awarded to the young rider classification winner | Young rider | Iván Sosa (COL) | (INEOS Grenadiers) |
| Jersey awarded to the team classification winner | Team | INEOS Grenadiers | |

The 2021 Tour de la Provence was a road cycling stage race that took place between 11 and 14 February 2021 in the French region of Provence. The race is rated as a 2.Pro event as part of the 2021 UCI Europe Tour and the 2021 UCI ProSeries, and was the sixth edition of the Tour de la Provence cycling race.

== Teams ==
Fourteen of the nineteen UCI WorldTeams, four UCI ProTeams, and two UCI Continental teams made up the twenty teams that participated in the race. Each team entered a roster of seven riders, for a total of 139 starters, after Serbian rider Dušan Rajović of Delko was a last-minute non-starter. 133 riders finished the race.

UCI WorldTeams

- AG2R Citroën Team
- Astana–Premier Tech
- Bora–Hansgrohe
- Cofidis
- Deceuninck–Quick-Step
- Groupama–FDJ
- INEOS Grenadiers
- Lotto–Soudal
- Movistar Team
- Team Bahrain Victorious
- Team DSM
- Team Qhubeka Assos
- Trek–Segafredo
- UAE Team Emirates

UCI ProTeams

- Arkéa–Samsic
- B&B Hotels p/b KTM
- Delko
- Total Direct Énergie

UCI Continental Teams

- St. Michel–Auber93
- Xelliss–Roubaix–Lille Métropole

== Route ==
Stage characteristics and winners
| Stage | Date | Course | Distance | Type | Stage winner |
|---|---|---|---|---|---|
| 1 | 11 February | Aubagne to Six-Fours-les-Plages | 182.3 km (113.3 mi) | Hilly stage | Davide Ballerini (ITA) |
| 2 | 12 February | Cassis to Manosque | 174.7 km (108.6 mi) | Hilly stage | Davide Ballerini (ITA) |
| 3 | 13 February | Istres to Mont Ventoux–Chalet Reynard | 153.9 km (95.6 mi) | Mountain stage | Iván Sosa (COL) |
| 4 | 14 February | Avignon to Salon-de-Provence | 163.2 km (101.4 mi) | Flat stage | Phil Bauhaus (GER) |
| Total | | 674.1 km (418.9 mi) | | | |

== Stages ==
=== Stage 1 ===
11 February 2021 – Aubagne to Six-Fours-les-Plages, 182.3 km (113.3 mi)

Stage 1 Result
| Rank | Rider | Team | Time |
|---|---|---|---|
| 1 | Davide Ballerini (ITA) | Deceuninck–Quick-Step | 4h 43' 23" |
| 2 | Arnaud Démare (FRA) | Groupama–FDJ | + 0" |
| 3 | Nacer Bouhanni (FRA) | Arkéa–Samsic | + 0" |
| 4 | Clément Venturini (ITA) | AG2R Citroën Team | + 0" |
| 5 | Matthew Walls (GBR) | Bora–Hansgrohe | + 0" |
| 6 | Ide Schelling (NED) | Bora–Hansgrohe | + 0" |
| 7 | Bryan Coquard (FRA) | B&B Hotels p/b KTM | + 0" |
| 8 | Phil Bauhaus (GER) | Team Bahrain Victorious | + 0" |
| 9 | Matteo Moschetti (ITA) | Trek–Segafredo | + 0" |
| 10 | Alexander Kristoff (NOR) | UAE Team Emirates | + 0" |

General classification after Stage 1
| Rank | Rider | Team | Time |
|---|---|---|---|
| 1 | Davide Ballerini (ITA) | Deceuninck–Quick-Step | 4h 43' 13" |
| 2 | Arnaud Démare (FRA) | Groupama–FDJ | + 4" |
| 3 | Nacer Bouhanni (FRA) | Arkéa–Samsic | + 6" |
| 4 | Lilian Calmejane (FRA) | AG2R Citroën Team | + 6" |
| 5 | Julian Alaphilippe (FRA) | Deceuninck–Quick-Step | + 7" |
| 6 | Bauke Mollema (NED) | Trek–Segafredo | + 9" |
| 7 | Gianni Moscon (ITA) | INEOS Grenadiers | + 9" |
| 8 | Clément Venturini (ITA) | AG2R Citroën Team | + 10" |
| 9 | Matthew Walls (GBR) | Bora–Hansgrohe | + 10" |
| 10 | Ide Schelling (NED) | Bora–Hansgrohe | + 10" |

=== Stage 2 ===
12 February 2021 – Cassis to Manosque, 174.7 km (108.6 mi)

Stage 2 Result
| Rank | Rider | Team | Time |
|---|---|---|---|
| 1 | Davide Ballerini (ITA) | Deceuninck–Quick-Step | 4h 21' 49" |
| 2 | Giulio Ciccone (ITA) | Trek–Segafredo | + 0" |
| 3 | Alex Aranburu (ESP) | Astana–Premier Tech | + 0" |
| 4 | Dylan Teuns (BEL) | Team Bahrain Victorious | + 0" |
| 5 | Patrick Konrad (AUT) | Bora–Hansgrohe | + 0" |
| 6 | Alexey Lutsenko (KAZ) | Astana–Premier Tech | + 0" |
| 7 | Gianni Moscon (ITA) | INEOS Grenadiers | + 0" |
| 8 | Stefano Oldani (ITA) | Lotto–Soudal | + 0" |
| 9 | Sven Erik Bystrøm (NOR) | UAE Team Emirates | + 0" |
| 10 | Bauke Mollema (NED) | Trek–Segafredo | + 0" |

General classification after Stage 2
| Rank | Rider | Team | Time |
|---|---|---|---|
| 1 | Davide Ballerini (ITA) | Deceuninck–Quick-Step | 9h 04' 52" |
| 2 | Alex Aranburu (ESP) | Astana–Premier Tech | + 16" |
| 3 | Julian Alaphilippe (FRA) | Deceuninck–Quick-Step | + 17" |
| 4 | Bauke Mollema (NED) | Trek–Segafredo | + 19" |
| 5 | Gianni Moscon (ITA) | INEOS Grenadiers | + 19" |
| 6 | Patrick Konrad (AUT) | Bora–Hansgrohe | + 20" |
| 7 | Dylan Teuns (BEL) | Team Bahrain Victorious | + 20" |
| 8 | Jack Haig (AUS) | Team Bahrain Victorious | + 20" |
| 9 | Ide Schelling (NED) | Bora–Hansgrohe | + 20" |
| 10 | Aurélien Paret-Peintre (FRA) | AG2R Citroën Team | + 20" |

=== Stage 3 ===
13 February 2021 – Istres to Mont Ventoux–Chalet Reynard, 153.9 km (95.6 mi)

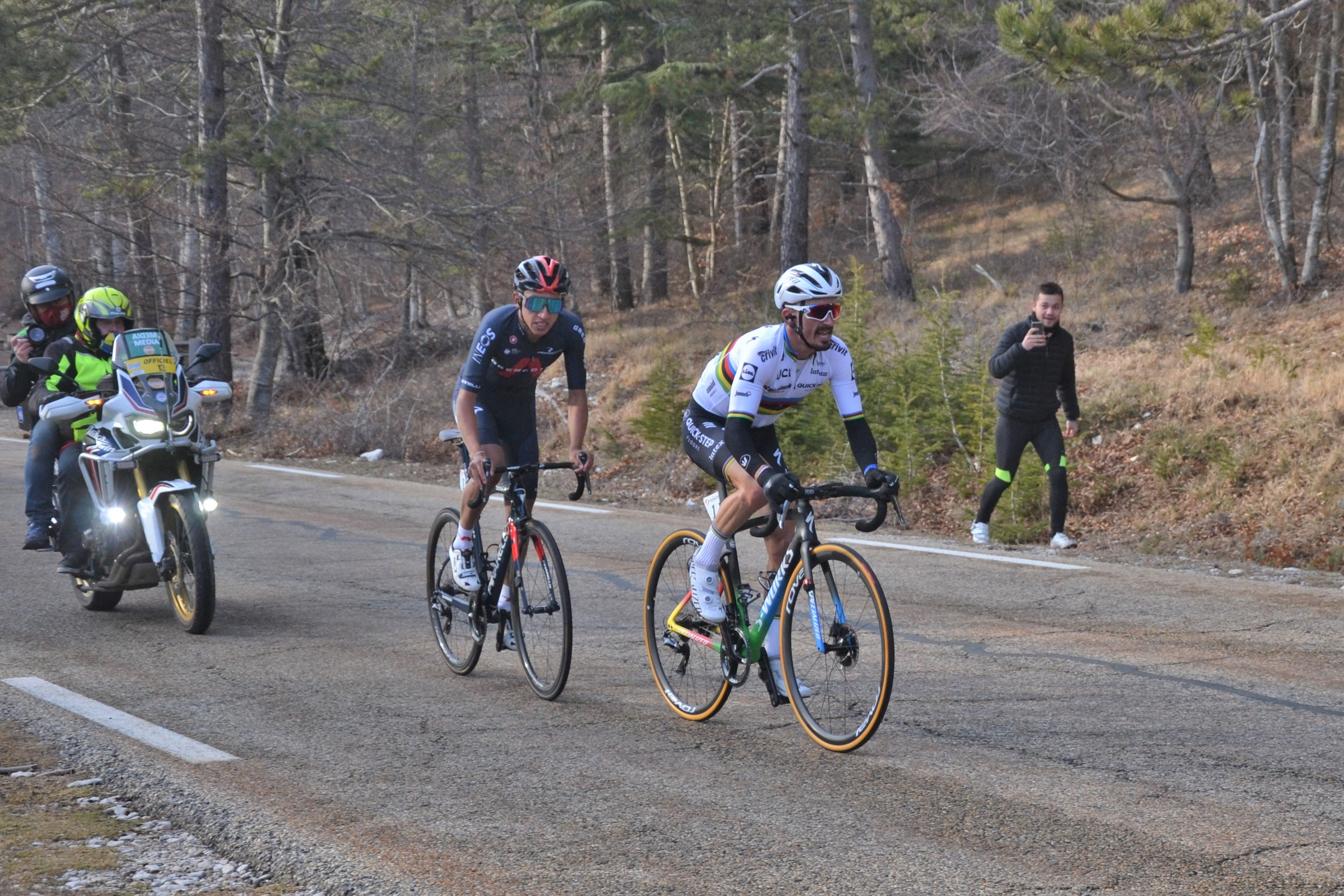
Alaphilippe (front) and Bernal on the final climb up to Chalet Reynard

Stage 3 Result
| Rank | Rider | Team | Time |
|---|---|---|---|
| 1 | Iván Sosa (COL) | INEOS Grenadiers | 4h 08' 14" |
| 2 | Egan Bernal (COL) | INEOS Grenadiers | + 15" |
| 3 | Julian Alaphilippe (FRA) | Deceuninck–Quick-Step | + 18" |
| 4 | Wout Poels (NED) | Team Bahrain Victorious | + 29" |
| 5 | Jesús Herrada (ESP) | Cofidis | + 48" |
| 6 | Giulio Ciccone (ITA) | Trek–Segafredo | + 48" |
| 7 | Bauke Mollema (NED) | Trek–Segafredo | + 48" |
| 8 | Mauri Vansevenant (BEL) | Deceuninck–Quick-Step | + 48" |
| 9 | Jack Haig (AUS) | Team Bahrain Victorious | + 48" |
| 10 | Patrick Konrad (AUT) | Bora–Hansgrohe | + 48" |

General classification after Stage 3
| Rank | Rider | Team | Time |
|---|---|---|---|
| 1 | Iván Sosa (COL) | INEOS Grenadiers | 13h 13' 16" |
| 2 | Egan Bernal (COL) | INEOS Grenadiers | + 19" |
| 3 | Julian Alaphilippe (FRA) | Deceuninck–Quick-Step | + 21" |
| 4 | Wout Poels (NED) | Team Bahrain Victorious | + 39" |
| 5 | Bauke Mollema (NED) | Trek–Segafredo | + 57" |
| 6 | Patrick Konrad (AUT) | Bora–Hansgrohe | + 58" |
| 7 | Jack Haig (AUS) | Team Bahrain Victorious | + 58" |
| 8 | Mauri Vansevenant (BEL) | Deceuninck–Quick-Step | + 58" |
| 9 | Jesús Herrada (ESP) | Cofidis | + 58" |
| 10 | Aleksandr Vlasov (RUS) | Astana–Premier Tech | + 58" |

=== Stage 4 ===
14 February 2021 – Avignon to Salon-de-Provence, 163.2 km (101.4 mi)

Stage 4 Result
| Rank | Rider | Team | Time |
|---|---|---|---|
| 1 | Phil Bauhaus (GER) | Team Bahrain Victorious | 3h 47' 01" |
| 2 | Davide Ballerini (ITA) | Deceuninck–Quick-Step | + 0" |
| 3 | Nacer Bouhanni (FRA) | Arkéa–Samsic | + 0" |
| 4 | Matteo Moschetti (ITA) | Trek–Segafredo | + 0" |
| 5 | Bryan Coquard (FRA) | B&B Hotels p/b KTM | + 0" |
| 6 | John Degenkolb (GER) | Lotto–Soudal | + 0" |
| 7 | Matthew Walls (GBR) | Bora–Hansgrohe | + 0" |
| 8 | Niccolò Bonifazio (ITA) | Total Direct Énergie | + 0" |
| 9 | Eduard-Michael Grosu (ROU) | Delko | + 0" |
| 10 | Alexander Kristoff (NOR) | UAE Team Emirates | + 0" |

General classification after Stage 4
| Rank | Rider | Team | Time |
|---|---|---|---|
| 1 | Iván Sosa (COL) | INEOS Grenadiers | 17h 00' 17" |
| 2 | Julian Alaphilippe (FRA) | Deceuninck–Quick-Step | + 18" |
| 3 | Egan Bernal (COL) | INEOS Grenadiers | + 19" |
| 4 | Wout Poels (NED) | Team Bahrain Victorious | + 39" |
| 5 | Patrick Konrad (AUT) | Bora–Hansgrohe | + 57" |
| 6 | Bauke Mollema (NED) | Trek–Segafredo | + 57" |
| 7 | Jack Haig (AUS) | Team Bahrain Victorious | + 58" |
| 8 | Mauri Vansevenant (BEL) | Deceuninck–Quick-Step | + 58" |
| 9 | Jesús Herrada (ESP) | Cofidis | + 58" |
| 10 | Aleksandr Vlasov (RUS) | Astana–Premier Tech | + 58" |

== Classification leadership table ==
Classification leadership by stage
| Stage | Winner | General classification | Points classification | Mountains classification | Young rider classification | Teams classification | Combativity award |
|---|---|---|---|---|---|---|---|
| 1 | Davide Ballerini | Davide Ballerini | Davide Ballerini | Lilian Calmejane | Matthew Walls | Bora–Hansgrohe | Julian Alaphilippe |
| 2 | Davide Ballerini | Davide Ballerini | Davide Ballerini | Lilian Calmejane | Ide Schelling | Bora–Hansgrohe | Filippo Conca |
| 3 | Iván Sosa | Iván Sosa | Davide Ballerini | Filippo Conca | Iván Sosa | INEOS Grenadiers | Nicola Bagioli |
| 4 | Phil Bauhaus | Iván Sosa | Davide Ballerini | Filippo Conca | Iván Sosa | INEOS Grenadiers | Lluís Mas |
| Final | | Iván Sosa | Davide Ballerini | Filippo Conca | Iván Sosa | INEOS Grenadiers | Not awarded |

== Final classification standings ==
Legend
| Denotes the winner of the general classification | Denotes the winner of the young rider classification |
| Denotes the winner of the points classification | Denotes the winner of the team classification |
| Denotes the winner of the mountains classification | |

=== General classification ===
Final general classification (1–10)
| Rank | Rider | Team | Time |
|---|---|---|---|
| 1 | Iván Sosa (COL) | INEOS Grenadiers | 17h 00' 17" |
| 2 | Julian Alaphilippe (FRA) | Deceuninck–Quick-Step | + 18" |
| 3 | Egan Bernal (COL) | INEOS Grenadiers | + 19" |
| 4 | Wout Poels (NED) | Team Bahrain Victorious | + 39" |
| 5 | Patrick Konrad (AUT) | Bora–Hansgrohe | + 57" |
| 6 | Bauke Mollema (NED) | Trek–Segafredo | + 57" |
| 7 | Jack Haig (AUS) | Team Bahrain Victorious | + 58" |
| 8 | Mauri Vansevenant (BEL) | Deceuninck–Quick-Step | + 58" |
| 9 | Jesús Herrada (ESP) | Cofidis | + 58" |
| 10 | Aleksandr Vlasov (RUS) | Astana–Premier Tech | + 58" |

=== Points classification ===
Final points classification (1–10)
| Rank | Rider | Team | Points |
|---|---|---|---|
| 1 | Davide Ballerini (ITA) | Deceuninck–Quick-Step | 42 |
| 2 | Phil Bauhaus (GER) | Team Bahrain Victorious | 20 |
| 3 | Nacer Bouhanni (FRA) | Arkéa–Samsic | 20 |
| 4 | Giulio Ciccone (ITA) | Trek–Segafredo | 18 |
| 5 | Julian Alaphilippe (FRA) | Deceuninck–Quick-Step | 16 |
| 6 | Eduard-Michael Grosu (ROU) | Delko | 14 |
| 7 | Matthew Walls (GBR) | Bora–Hansgrohe | 14 |
| 8 | Bryan Coquard (FRA) | B&B Hotels p/b KTM | 13 |
| 9 | Matteo Moschetti (ITA) | Trek–Segafredo | 13 |
| 10 | Arnaud Démare (FRA) | Groupama–FDJ | 12 |

=== Mountains classification ===
Final mountains classification (1–10)
| Rank | Rider | Team | Points |
|---|---|---|---|
| 1 | Filippo Conca (ITA) | Lotto–Soudal | 15 |
| 2 | Andreas Leknessund (NOR) | Team DSM | 15 |
| 3 | Jérôme Cousin (FRA) | Total Direct Énergie | 9 |
| 4 | Delio Fernández (ESP) | Delko | 9 |
| 5 | Jérémy Leveau (FRA) | Xelliss–Roubaix–Lille Métropole | 8 |
| 6 | Julian Alaphilippe (FRA) | Deceuninck–Quick-Step | 7 |
| 7 | Samuel Leroux (FRA) | Xelliss–Roubaix–Lille Métropole | 6 |
| 8 | Iván Sosa (COL) | INEOS Grenadiers | 5 |
| 9 | Mauri Vansevenant (BEL) | Deceuninck–Quick-Step | 5 |
| 10 | Lluís Mas (ESP) | Movistar Team | 5 |

=== Young rider classification ===
Final young rider classification (1–10)
| Rank | Rider | Team | Time |
|---|---|---|---|
| 1 | Iván Sosa (COL) | INEOS Grenadiers | 17h 00' 17" |
| 2 | Egan Bernal (COL) | INEOS Grenadiers | + 19" |
| 3 | Mauri Vansevenant (BEL) | Deceuninck–Quick-Step | + 58" |
| 4 | Aleksandr Vlasov (RUS) | Astana–Premier Tech | + 58" |
| 5 | Aurélien Paret-Peintre (FRA) | AG2R Citroën Team | + 1' 28" |
| 6 | Matteo Jorgenson (USA) | Movistar Team | + 1' 28" |
| 7 | Carlos Rodriguez (ESP) | INEOS Grenadiers | + 2' 18" |
| 8 | Ide Schelling (NED) | Bora–Hansgrohe | + 3' 52" |
| 9 | Abner González (PUR) | Movistar Team | + 4' 26" |
| 10 | Stefano Oldani (ITA) | Lotto–Soudal | + 4' 52" |

=== Team classification ===
Final team classification (1–10)
| Rank | Team | Time |
|---|---|---|
| 1 | INEOS Grenadiers | 51h 03' 44" |
| 2 | Team Bahrain Victorious | + 44" |
| 3 | AG2R Citroën Team | + 3' 29" |
| 4 | Bora–Hansgrohe | + 3' 31" |
| 5 | Astana–Premier Tech | + 3' 50" |
| 6 | Movistar Team | + 4' 28" |
| 7 | Team Qhubeka Assos | + 6' 39" |
| 8 | Cofidis | + 9' 00" |
| 9 | Deceuninck–Quick-Step | + 9' 53" |
| 10 | Arkéa–Samsic | + 11' 35" |
