= Mauri Vansevenant =

Belgian cyclist (born 1999)

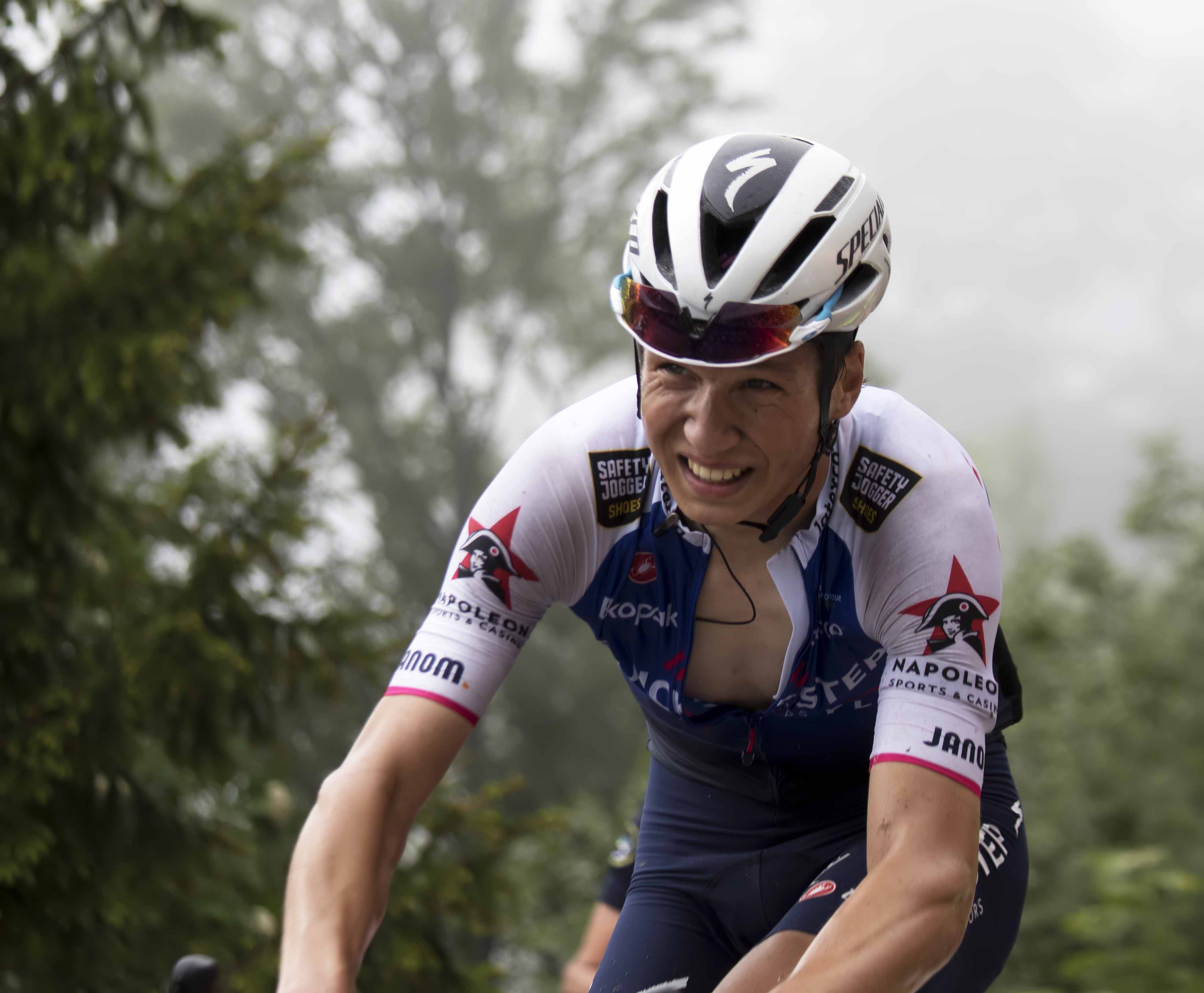
- Vansevenant at the 2022 Giro d'Italia

Personal information
- Full name: Mauri Vansevenant
- Born: 1 June 1999 (age 27) Ostend, Belgium

Cycling career
- Sport: Cycling
- Current team: Soudal–Quick-Step
- Discipline: Road
- Role: Rider
- Rider type: Climber

Amateur team
- 2018–2020: EFC–L&R–Vulsteke

Professional team
- 2020–: Deceuninck–Quick-Step

Major wins
- One-day races and Classics GP Industria & Artigianato (2021)

Mauri Vansevenant (born 1 June 1999) is a Belgian cyclist, who currently rides for UCI WorldTeam Soudal–Quick-Step. He is the son of former professional cyclist Wim Vansevenant, and is named after Melcior Mauri, the winner of the 1991 Vuelta a España.

== Major results ==
2017
4th Grand Prix Bob Jungels
2018
5th Piccolo Giro di Lombardia
10th Overall Giro della Valle d'Aosta

1st Young rider classification

2019
1st Overall Giro della Valle d'Aosta

1st Young rider classification

4th Overall Orlen Nations Grand Prix
5th Overall Grand Prix Priessnitz spa
6th Overall Tour de l'Avenir
2020
1st Stage 1b (TTT) Settimana Internazionale di Coppi e Bartali
2021 (1 pro win)
1st GP Industria & Artigianato di Larciano
3rd Trofeo Laigueglia
7th Overall Settimana Internazionale di Coppi e Bartali
8th Overall Tour de la Provence
2022
2nd Overall Okolo Slovenska
2nd Faun-Ardèche Classic
5th Overall Deutschland Tour
8th Overall Vuelta a Andalucía
8th Overall Tour de l'Ain
2023 (1)
2nd Overall Tour of Oman

1st Stage 5

2024 (1)
4th Overall Tour de Luxembourg

1st Stage 3

4th Amstel Gold Race
5th Japan Cup
6th Liège–Bastogne–Liège
7th Overall Tour of Oman
2025
9th Overall O Gran Camiño
9th Muscat Classic
2026
7th Amstel Gold Race
8th Overall AlUla Tour
9th Muscat Classic
10th Trofeo Laigueglia

=== Grand Tour general classification results timeline ===
Grand Tour	2021	2022	2023	2024	2025
Giro d'Italia	—	30	—	30	—
Tour de France	—	—	—	—	—
Vuelta a España	101	—	—	49	73
