= Al Sogara =

Village in Ad Dakhiliyah Governorate, Oman

Al Sogara in Ad Dakhiliyah Governorate
- Village
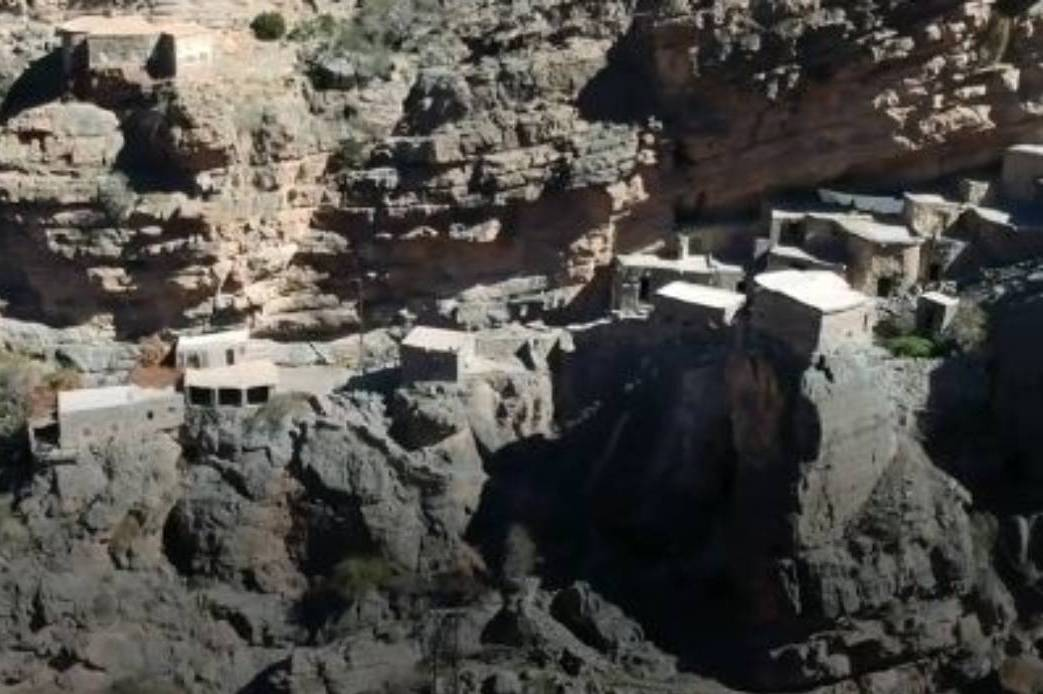
- Al Sogara village in Oman
- Country: Oman

Population
  - Total: 25

Al Sogara is a village in Ad Dakhiliyah Governorate, Oman. It is located about 200 kilometers (~125 miles) southwest of Muscat and some 40 kilometers (~20 miles) from the main mountain city of Seih Qatana. The village is carved into the mountainside of the Jebel Akhdar, also known as the Green Mountain.

Around 195 kilometers (~124 miles) southwest of Muscat’s sand-fringed coastline, Oman's dusty plains rise into the limestone folds of the Jabal al Akhdar, a massif 2,980 meters high. This maze of twisting valleys and deep canyons is one of the country's most remote corners and as the road loses its asphalt, the only way forward is on foot, by mule, or by all-terrain vehicle.

Al Sogara is described as one of the most remote villages in Oman. It is existed for more than 500 years. When the village was in its infancy, the villagers carved houses into the limestone, creating a protective barrier against storms and the winter cold. Presently, the village is a tiny community of 25 residents living on the edge of the Green Mountain.

The villagers descend from the Al-Shariqi tribe, which originated in Jordan over 1,000 years ago. Al Sogara has remained virtually untouched for centuries; until 2005, foreigners were barred from visiting because Al Sogara was used as the center of a militarized zone.

The village has since been modernized. Electricity has been installed to help provide power to cable cars aiding villagers with transportation and deliveries to and from the village. Due to the high altitude and rocky terrain, a helicopter regularly helps deliver supplies to Al Sogara. In addition to electricity, the village now has a man-made water canal that provides fresh water to villagers.

In 2014, because of the increase in tourism, the village's inhabitants moved to the other side of the hill to preserve their peace and quiet. We pass through their new village just before parking at the parking lot, from which the old village can be accessed by stairs. The village, although still authentic, has been converted into a hotel and café.

In 2019, BBC Travel visited Al Sogara and described it as the most remote village in the region.
