= Birkat Al-Mawz =

Coordinates: 22.914662°N 57.671227°E

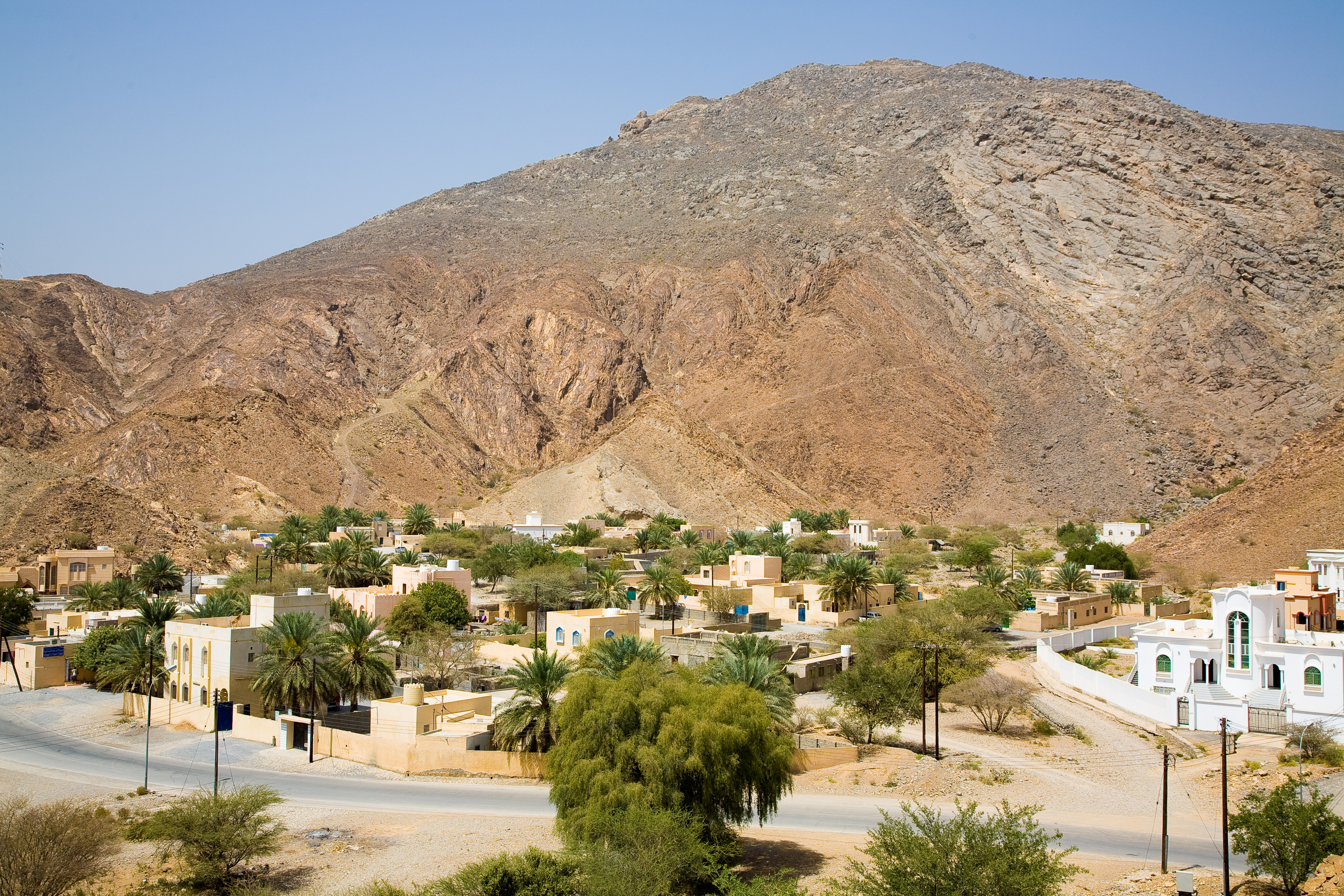
Birkat Al-Mawz

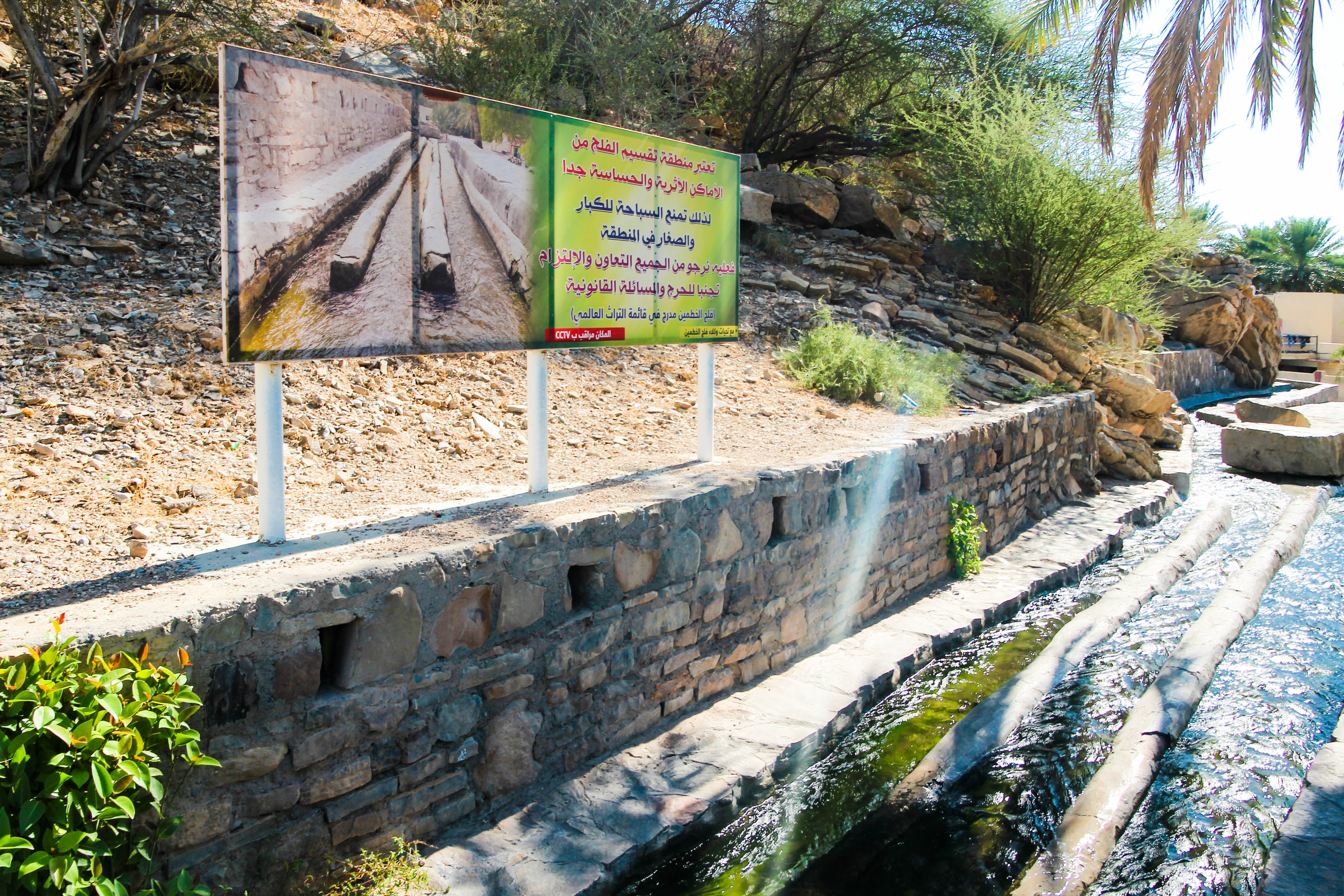
Falaj Al Khatmeen in Birkat Al-Mawz

Birkat Al-Mawz is a village in the Ad Dakhiliyah Region of Oman. It is located at the entrance of Wadi al-Muaydin on the southern rim of Jebel Akhdar and is home to a restored fort called Bait al Redidah. A road and a walking route through Wadi al-Mu up to the Saiq Plateau start from here.
