= Nakhal Fort =

Fort in Oman

- قَلْعَة نَخَل (in Arabic)
- Nakhal, Al Batinah South Governorate, Oman
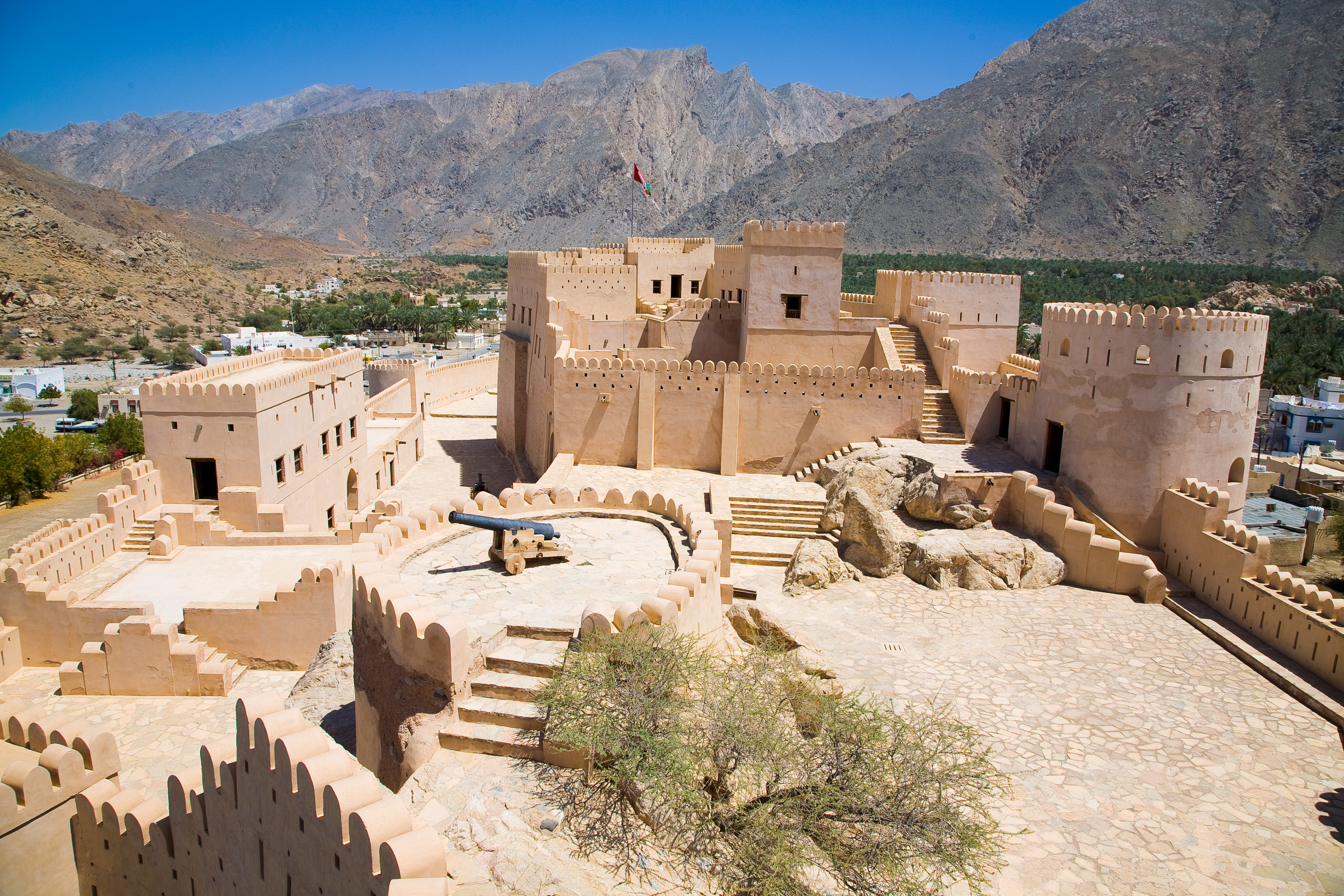
- View of Nakhal Fort

Site information
- Type: Fort
- Open to the public: Yes

Location
- Coordinates: 23.395°N 57.829°E

Site history
- Built: Pre-7th century (refurbished in 17th century, extended in 1834)
- Built by: Imam Said bin Sultan in 1834

Nakhal Fort (Arabic: قَلْعَة نَخَل, romanized: Qalʿat Nakhal) is a large fortification in Al Batinah Region of Oman. It is named after the Wilayah of Nakhal.

== History ==
The fort, also known as Husn Al Heem, was named after the state of Nakhal that exists above the old village of Nakhl. Imams of Wadi Bani Kharous and the Ya'arubah dynasty resided here in the past. Over the centuries, it underwent many renovations and improvements. It was reconstructed by Omani architects in the 17th century. Initially built as a protective measure for an area oasis and nearby trade routes, it passes through the regional capital of Nizwa. The gateway and towers seen now were extensions built in 1834 attributed to imam Said bin Sultan. In 1990, it was fully renovated.

In November 2003, the Prince of Wales Charles (now Charles III) visited the restored fort during an official visit to Oman.

== Overview ==
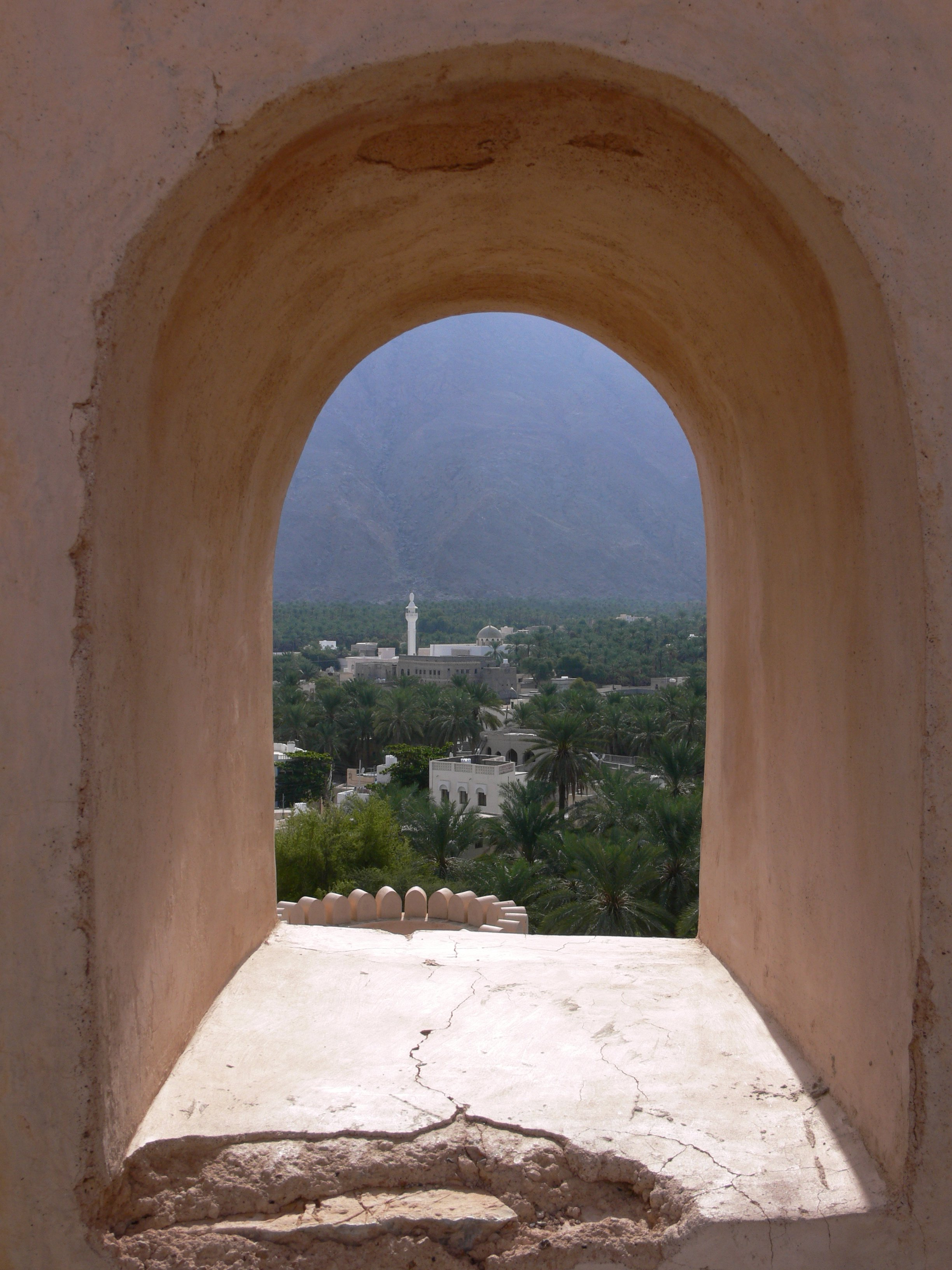
Archway

The fort is approximately 120 kilometres (75 mi) to the west of Muscat, the capital of Oman, at the entrance of Wilayt Nakhal in Wadi Ar Raqeem. It is situated on a rocky prominence at the foot of Jebel Nakhal, a spur of the main Western Hajar range. It is to the northeast of Jabal Akhdar also called green mountain. Nakhal Fort is surrounded by orchards of palm trees. Its battlements provide a view of the Al Batinah Region. The ancient Nakhal village is below the fort and close by is the warm springs of Ain A'Thawwarah. Nakhal Fort is one of several fortifications in the Al Batinah Region, the others being Al Hazim, Al-Sifalah, Rustaq, and Shinas forts.

Built in the architectural style of the Sultanate of Oman, it is unique in that it was built to fit around an irregularly-shaped rock, with some rock exposures jutting out into the interiors. The fort houses a museum, operated by the Ministry of Tourism with exhibits of historic guns. A weekly Friday goat auction market takes place within the precincts of the fort. During recent renovations the fort has been fitted with traditional furniture, handicrafts and historic artifacts.
