= Al Sawadi, Oman =

Coordinates: 23.778°N 57.787°E

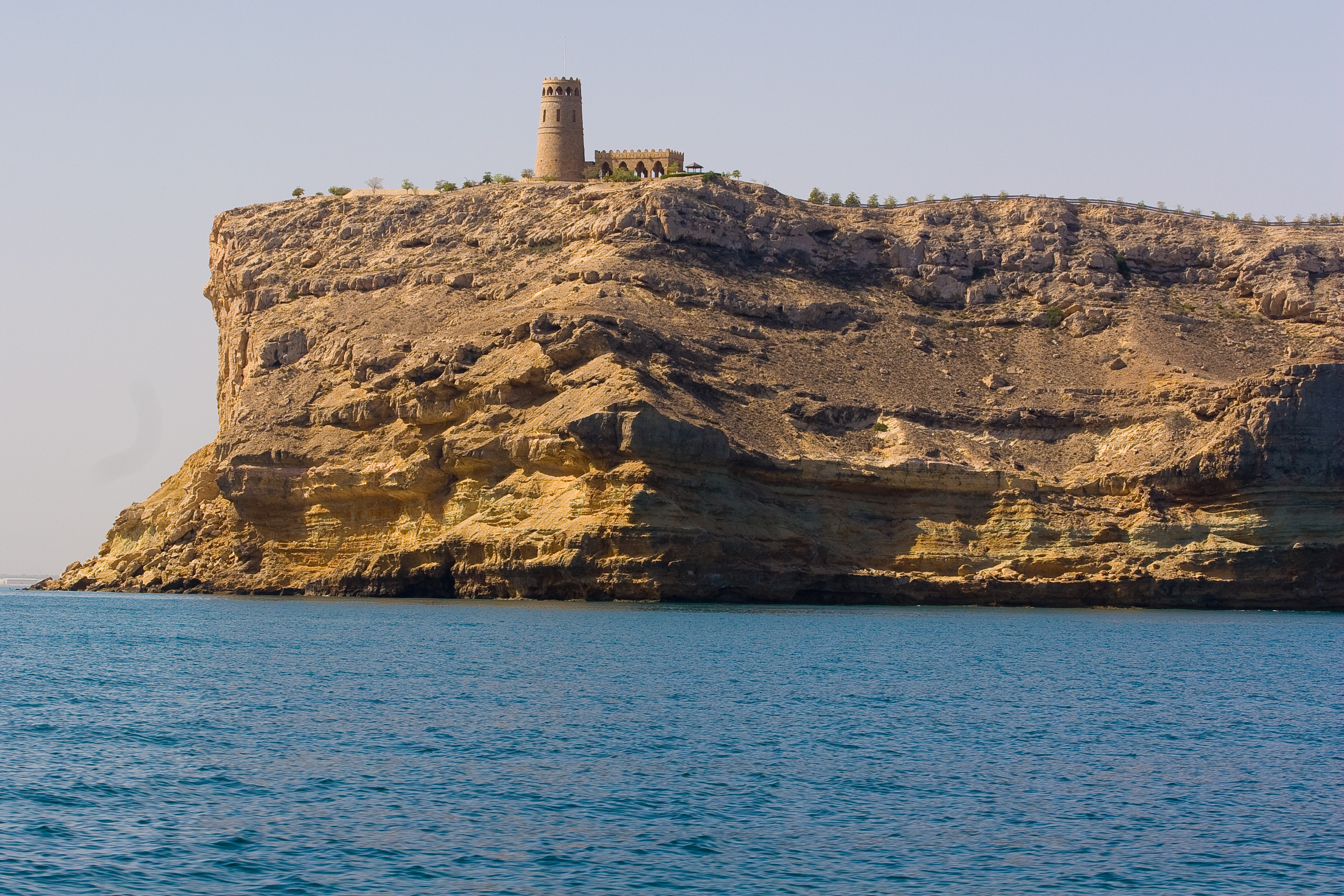
Al Sawadi's tidal island

Al Sawadi (or simply Sawadi) is a residential area in the province of Barka in the Al Batinah South Governorate. According to the National Centre for Statistics and Information 2010 federal census, it has a population of 5,445. It is renowned for its coastal location on the Gulf of Oman, making it a popular location for tourism of the area. The relatively short distance of 70 kilometers from the capital Muscat means it receives many foreign tourists. What makes it stand out from other nearby towns are its many islands and its main tidal island.
