= Tour of Oman =

Omani multi-day road cycling race

Race details
- Date: February
- Region: Oman
- Discipline: Road
- Competition: UCI ProSeries
- Type: Stage race
- Organiser: Amaury Sport Organisation
- Race director: Eddy Merckx
- Web site: www.tour-of-oman.com

History
- First edition: 2010
- Editions: 15 (as of 2026)
- First winner: Fabian Cancellara (SUI)
- Most wins: Chris Froome (GBR); Alexey Lutsenko (KAZ); Adam Yates (GBR) (2 wins each)
- Most recent: Christian Scaroni (ITA)

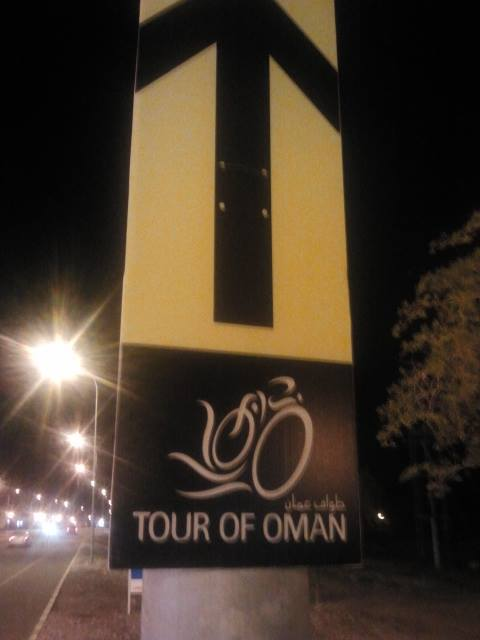
Tour of Oman banner on a lighting pole in Nakhl, Oman on February 21, 2014

The Tour of Oman is an annual professional road bicycle racing stage race held in Oman since 2010, as part of the UCI Asia Tour through 2019 and on the UCI ProSeries since 2022. It was scheduled to become part of the new UCI ProSeries in 2020, but both the 2020 and 2021 editions were cancelled due to the COVID-19 pandemic.

== History ==
Classified as a 2.HC (as of 2012), the race is organized by the Amaury Sport Organisation, and was held for the first time between 14 and 19 February 2010. The race is a men's competition consisting of six stages and contains mainly flat stages, with some hillier parts.

During the race, the leader of the General Classification wears a red jersey, the leader of sprinter's points classification is denoted by a green jersey and best young rider by white. The race does not contain a mountains jersey. The most aggressive rider wears a white jersey with green and red polka-dots.

The inaugural edition of the race in 2010, consisted of 6 stages, beginning with a 16-lap criterium in Muscat Corniche and ending with an 18.6 km time trial, also in Muscat. Fabian Cancellara won this event after coming second in the final time trial to Edvald Boasson Hagen.

== Past winners ==
=== General classification ===
Year	Country	Rider	Team
2010	Switzerland	Fabian Cancellara	Team Saxo Bank
2011	Netherlands	Robert Gesink	Rabobank
2012	Slovakia	Peter Velits	Omega Pharma–Quick-Step
2013	Great Britain	Chris Froome	Team Sky
2014	Great Britain	Chris Froome	Team Sky
2015	Spain	Rafael Valls	Lampre–Merida
2016	Italy	Vincenzo Nibali	Astana
2017	Belgium	Ben Hermans	BMC Racing Team
2018	Kazakhstan	Alexey Lutsenko	Astana
2019	Kazakhstan	Alexey Lutsenko	Astana
2020	No race due to a national mourning period following the death of Sultan Qaboos bin Said		
2021	No race due to the COVID-19 pandemic		
2022	Czech Republic	Jan Hirt	Intermarché–Wanty–Gobert Matériaux
2023	United States	Matteo Jorgenson	Movistar Team
2024	Great Britain	Adam Yates	UAE Team Emirates
2025	Great Britain	Adam Yates	UAE Team Emirates XRG
2026	Italy	Christian Scaroni	XDS Astana Team

==== Wins per country ====
Wins	Country
4	Great Britain
2	Kazakhstan; Italy
1	Belgium; Czech Republic; Netherlands; Slovakia; Spain; Switzerland; United States

=== Points classification ===
Year	Country	Rider	Team
2010	Norway	Edvald Boasson Hagen	Team Sky
2011	Norway	Edvald Boasson Hagen	Team Sky
2012	Slovakia	Peter Sagan	Liquigas–Cannondale
2013	Great Britain	Chris Froome	Team Sky
2014	Germany	André Greipel	Lotto–Belisol
2015	Italy	Andrea Guardini	Astana
2016	Norway	Edvald Boasson Hagen	Team Dimension Data
2017	Norway	Alexander Kristoff	Team Katusha–Alpecin
2018	Australia	Nathan Haas	Team Katusha–Alpecin
2019	Kazakhstan	Alexey Lutsenko	Astana
2020	No race due to a national mourning period following the death of Sultan Qaboos bin Said		
2021	No race due to the COVID-19 pandemic		
2022	Colombia	Fernando Gaviria	UAE Team Emirates
2023	United States	Matteo Jorgenson	Movistar Team
2024	New Zealand	Finn Fisher-Black	UAE Team Emirates
2025	France	Valentin Paret-Peintre	Soudal–Quick-Step
2026	Italy	Christian Scaroni	XDS Astana Team

=== Young rider classification ===
Year	Country	Rider	Team
2010	Norway	Edvald Boasson Hagen	Team Sky
2011	Netherlands	Robert Gesink	Rabobank
2012	France	Tony Gallopin	RadioShack–Nissan
2013	France	Kenny Elissonde	FDJ
2014	France	Romain Bardet	Ag2r–La Mondiale
2015	South Africa	Louis Meintjes	MTN–Qhubeka
2016	Australia	Brendan Canty	Drapac Professional Cycling
2017	Eritrea	Merhawi Kudus	Team Dimension Data
2018	Colombia	Miguel Ángel López	Astana
2019	France	Élie Gesbert	Arkéa–Samsic
2020	No race due to a national mourning period following the death of Sultan Qaboos bin Said		
2021	No race due to the COVID-19 pandemic		
2022	Denmark	Anthon Charmig	Uno-X Pro Cycling Team
2023	United States	Matteo Jorgenson	Movistar Team
2024	New Zealand	Finn Fisher-Black	UAE Team Emirates
2025	France	Valentin Paret-Peintre	Soudal–Quick-Step
2026	Colombia	Diego Pescador	Movistar Team

=== Active rider classification ===
Year	Country	Rider	Team
2010	Latvia	Gatis Smukulis	Ag2r–La Mondiale
2011	Slovenia	Marko Kump	Geox–TMC
2012	Belgium	Klaas Lodewyck	BMC Racing Team
2013	Netherlands	Bobbie Traksel	Champion System
2014	Belgium	Preben Van Hecke	Topsport Vlaanderen–Baloise
2015	Belgium	Jef Van Meirhaeghe	Topsport Vlaanderen–Baloise
2016	South Africa	Jacques Janse van Rensburg	Team Dimension Data
2017	Belgium	Aimé De Gendt	Sport Vlaanderen–Baloise
2018	France	Loïc Chetout	Cofidis
2019	Belgium	Preben Van Hecke	Sport Vlaanderen–Baloise
2020	No race due to a national mourning period following the death of Sultan Qaboos bin Said		
2021	No race due to the COVID-19 pandemic		
2022	Spain	Peio Goikoetxea	Euskaltel–Euskadi
2023	Norway	Fredrik Dversnes	Uno-X Pro Cycling Team
2024	Spain	Óscar Pelegrí	Burgos BH
2025	Spain	Rodrigo Álvarez	Burgos Burpellet BH
2026	Poland	Patryk Goszczurny	Visma–Lease a Bike Development

=== Team classification ===
Year	Based	Team
2010	(United States)	Team HTC–Columbia
2011	(Luxembourg)	Leopard Trek
2012	(Luxembourg)	RadioShack–Nissan
2013	(United States)	BMC Racing Team
2014	(United Kingdom)	Team Sky
2015	(United States)	BMC Racing Team
2016	(South Africa)	Team Dimension Data
2017	(South Africa)	Team Dimension Data
2018	(Kazakhstan)	Astana
2019	(Kazakhstan)	Astana
2020–2021	No race	
2022	(France)	Arkéa–Samsic
2023	(Germany)	Bora–Hansgrohe
2024	(United Arab Emirates)	UAE Team Emirates
2025	(Switzerland)	Q36.5 Pro Cycling Team
2026	(Kazakhstan)	XDS Astana Team

== Classifications ==
As of the 2022 edition, the jerseys worn by the leaders of the individual classifications are:

- Red Jersey – Worn by the leader of the general classification.
- Green Jersey – Worn by the leader of the points classification.
- Gold Jersey – Worn by the most active rider.
- White Jersey – Worn by the best rider under 23 years of age on the overall classification.
