= Wadi Al Abyadh =

Valley in Oman

Coordinates: 23.411°N 57.667°E

Wadi Al Abyadh (also known as Wadi Abidh and Wadi Abiyad) is a valley in the Al Batinah Region of Oman, which lies some 30 kilometres (19 mi) south of the Muscat-Sohar highway.

== Transport ==
A four-wheel drive vehicle is useful to explore this wadi, which is vested in green vegetation and white boulders and rocks, from which the wadi probably takes its name. The rough road runs through the middle of the wadi. There are pink oleander trees and many beautiful birds. The geology of Wadi Al Abyadh is also of great significance. The wadi contains an exposed ancient section of moho, the boundary between the Earth's crust and mantle.

== See also ==
- Oman
- Al Batinah
