= White jersey =

Classification leadership jersey in cycling

Numerous cycling stage races award a white jersey to signify the current leader and overall winner of a certain competition, or to signify the best young rider in the race. The most prominent of these is the Tour de France, where the jersey is known as the maillot blanc and is awarded to the best-placed rider age under 26. The use of the white jersey to recognize the best young rider in a race is its most common use, though some tours award a white jersey for a different classification.

Other stage races, besides the Tour de France, that also award a white jersey for the best young rider include:

- Deutschland Tour
- Giro d'Italia (known as the maglia bianca, and the cut-off is 25 years instead of 26)
- Paris–Nice
- Tour of California (where the cut-off is age 23 instead of 26)
- Tour of Ireland

== Other white jerseys ==
Some stage races award a white jersey for a different classification than youth. The foremost of these is probably the Vuelta a España, where it recognizes the leader in the Combination classification. In this classification, ranks in the General, Points, and Mountains classifications are added, and whoever has the lowest cumulative total is awarded the white jersey. It is a relatively new award, having existed only since the 2003 edition of the race. In 1941, the Vuelta a España white jersey was for the leader and overall winner of the General classification.

The Tour of the Basque Country awards a white jersey to the leader and overall winner of the Points classification. The Volta a Catalunya awards a white jersey with green stripes to the leader and overall winner of the General classification. The 2008 Tour de Suisse awarded a white jersey to a somewhat unusual competition, the Sprints classification, which awards placings not on stage finishes but strictly in intermediate sprints.

The Tour Down Under awards a white jersey, with green piping and side panels, to the leader and ultimately the winner of the King of the Mountains classification.
