= Yiti =

Yeti
- Village
- Location in Oman
- Coordinates: 23°32′N 58°40′E
- Country: Oman
- Governorate: Muscat Governorate
- Time zone: UTC+4 (Oman Standard Time)

Yeti (Arabic: يتي) is a village in Muscat, in northeastern Oman. Its population was estimated at 2,580 people according to the 2010 census of the National Center for Government Statistics.
