= Jebel Akhdar (Oman) =

Mountain range in eastern Oman

Coordinates: 23.1°N 57.4°E

Jebel Akhdar Mountains
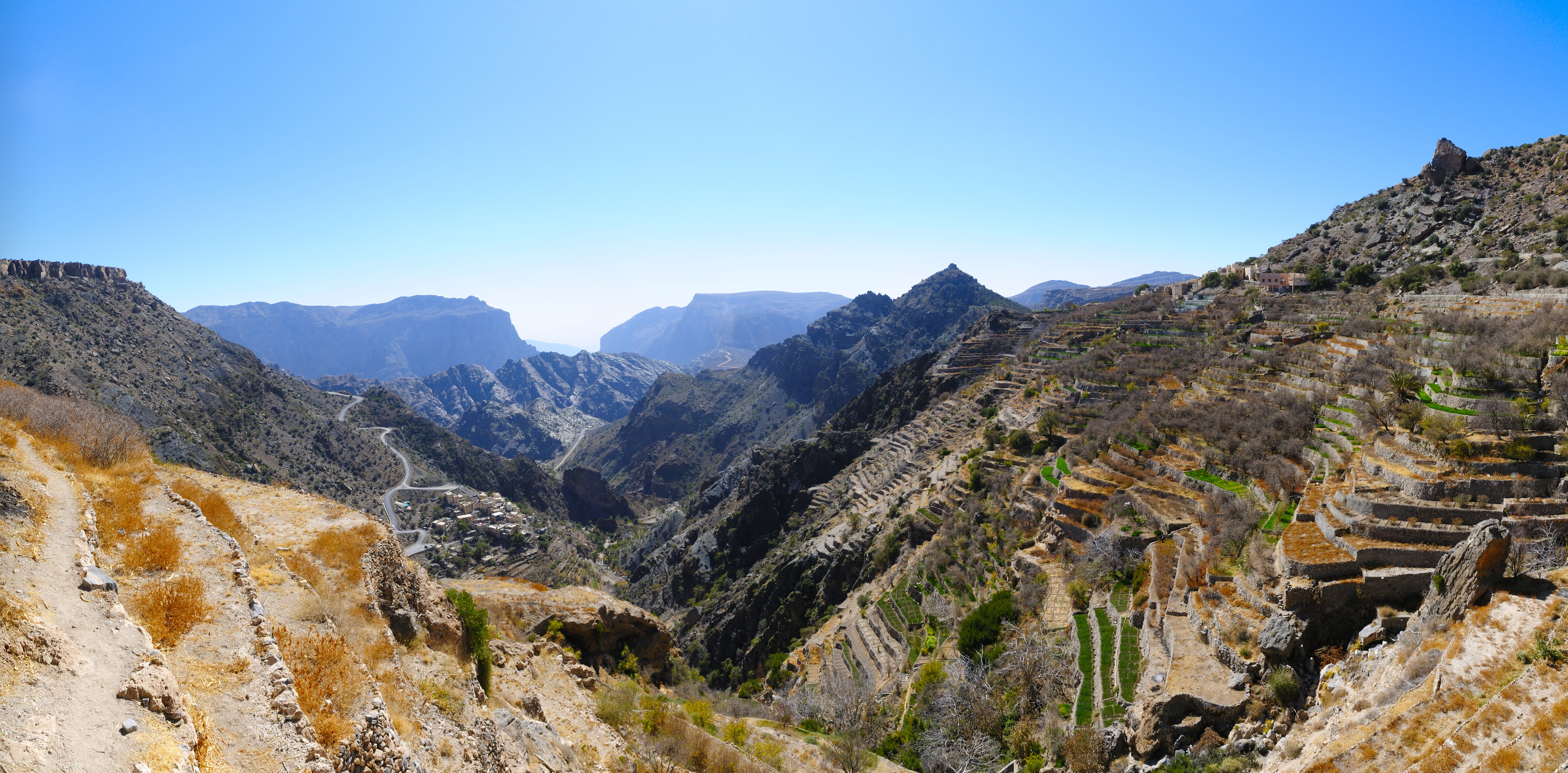
- Terraces in Jebel Akhdar, 2011

Highest point
- Elevation: 3,018 m (9,902 ft)

Naming
- Native name: Al-Jabal Al-Akhḍar (ٱلْجَبَل ٱلْأَخْضَر (Arabic))

Geography
- Location within Oman Location within Middle East Location within West and Central Asia
- Location: Oman
- Parent range: Al-Hajar Mountains

The Jebel Akhdar Mountains (Arabic: ٱلْجَبَل ٱلْأَخْضَر, romanized: Al-Jabal Al-Akhḍar, lit. 'The Green Mountain') is a mountain range approximately 80 km (50 mi) long and 32 km (20 mi) wide, that is part of the Hajar Mountains in Ad Dakhiliyah Governorate of Oman.

It rises to a height of 3,018 m (9,902 ft) and encompasses the Saiq Plateau at 2,000 m (6,600 ft) above sea level.

Jebel Akhdar Mountains is famous for its labyrinth of wadis (river valleys) and terraced orchards, where pomegranates, apricots, and roses grow in abundance due to its mild Mediterranean climate.

The highest peak in the Jebel Akhdar Mountains is Jebel Shams, which with its elevation of 3,018 m (9,902 ft) is also the highest peak in the Hajar range and in Oman.

Jebel Shams also has a second summit (the South Summit), which is publicly accessible for trekking via the W4 Trail. The elevation of the second south summit is 2,997 m (9,833 ft).

== Geology and geography ==
This mostly limestone mountain is one of the highest points in Oman and eastern Arabia. Jebel Akhdar lies at the central section of the Hajar range, located around 150 km (93 mi) from Muscat and accessible only by four-wheel drive. The range is mostly desert, but at higher altitudes receives around 300 mm (12 in) of precipitation annually — moist enough to allow the growth of shrubs and trees and support agriculture. It is this that gives the mountains their "green" name.

An old stronghold on the inland side of the mountain is Birkat al-Mawz, or Pool of the Plantains, with a layout similar to the nearby Jabrin palace.

"Poised across the yawning mouth of a great pass into the mountains, Birkat al-Mawz was one of the fortresses of the Bani Riyam tribe which controlled the mountain heartland. Collapsing into ruin until recently, the mud-brick fortress and its painted ceilings are now well on the way to restoration."

— Aramco World.

The area is about a 45-minute drive from Nizwa and is known for its traditional rose water extraction and agricultural products including pomegranates, walnuts, apricots, black grapes, and peaches. It is also the site of honey bee breeding for much of Oman. Agricultural production is improved by the use of Falaj irrigation channels and their associated terraces system devised by the local farmers, who have lived on this mountain for hundreds of years. Al Sogara is a historic village carved into the mountainside. The Jebel is mostly inhabited by the ancient Arab tribe Bani Riyam (al Riyamy). Most descendants of the tribe are now in the four nearby villages, including Nizwa, Izki and Ibra.

== Ecology ==
Jebel Akhdar Mountains is in Al Hajar montane woodlands ecoregion. The plant communities on the mountain vary with elevation. Shrublands and dry grasslands are found from 450 to 1,300 meters elevation. The grasses and shrubs are adapted to arid conditions, and include many drought-deciduous and succulent plants. Typical shrubs include Convolvulus acanthocladus, Euphorbia larica, Grewia tenax subsp. makranica, Jaubertia aucheri, Maerua crassifolia, Moringa peregrina, and Pseudogaillonia hymenostephana.

Semi-evergreen woodlands of sclerophyllous trees are found between 1,350 and 2,350 meters elevation. Common trees and shrubs include Sideroxylon mascatense, Dodonaea viscosa, Olive (Olea europaea), Ebenus stellatus, Grewia villosa, Juniperus seravschanica, Myrtus communis, and Sageretia spiciflora.

Above 2300 meters elevation, open woodlands of juniper (Juniperus seravschanica) predominate, with the shrubs Cotoneaster nummularius, Daphne mucronata, Ephedra pachyclada, Euryops arabicus, Lonicera aucheri, Periploca aphylla, and Sageretia spiciflora.

== Farming ==
The mountain is a traditional farming area, with mountain springs providing sufficient for irrigation needs. However, climate change has reduced annual rainfall and increased nighttime temperatures.

== History ==
Between 1954 and 1959, the area became a site of the Jebel Akhdar War, a conflict between Omani forces loyal to the sultan of Oman (aided by British soldiers, including the Special Air Service) and Saudi Arabian-backed rebel forces of the inland Imamate of Oman.

In August 2011, Sultan Qaboos designated Jebel Akhdar a nature reserve in a bid to conserve its unique yet fragile biodiversity. A decree issued by Sultan Qaboos established the 'Jebel Akhdar Sanctuary for Natural Sceneries'. The Minister of Environment and Climate Affairs has authority to draft guidelines regulating access and developmental activity within the reserve.

Since 2011, the mountain has featured as the principal climb in the Tour of Oman road bicycle race. In the area, several important rock art sites, with figures dating back to 6,000 years ago, have been discovered and studied.

In 2025, the mountain was designated as a biosphere reserve by UNESCO.

== See also ==
- Nakhal
- Al-Hamra
- Samail
