= Al Hajar montane woodlands =

Terrestrial ecoregion in Oman and the United Arab Emirates

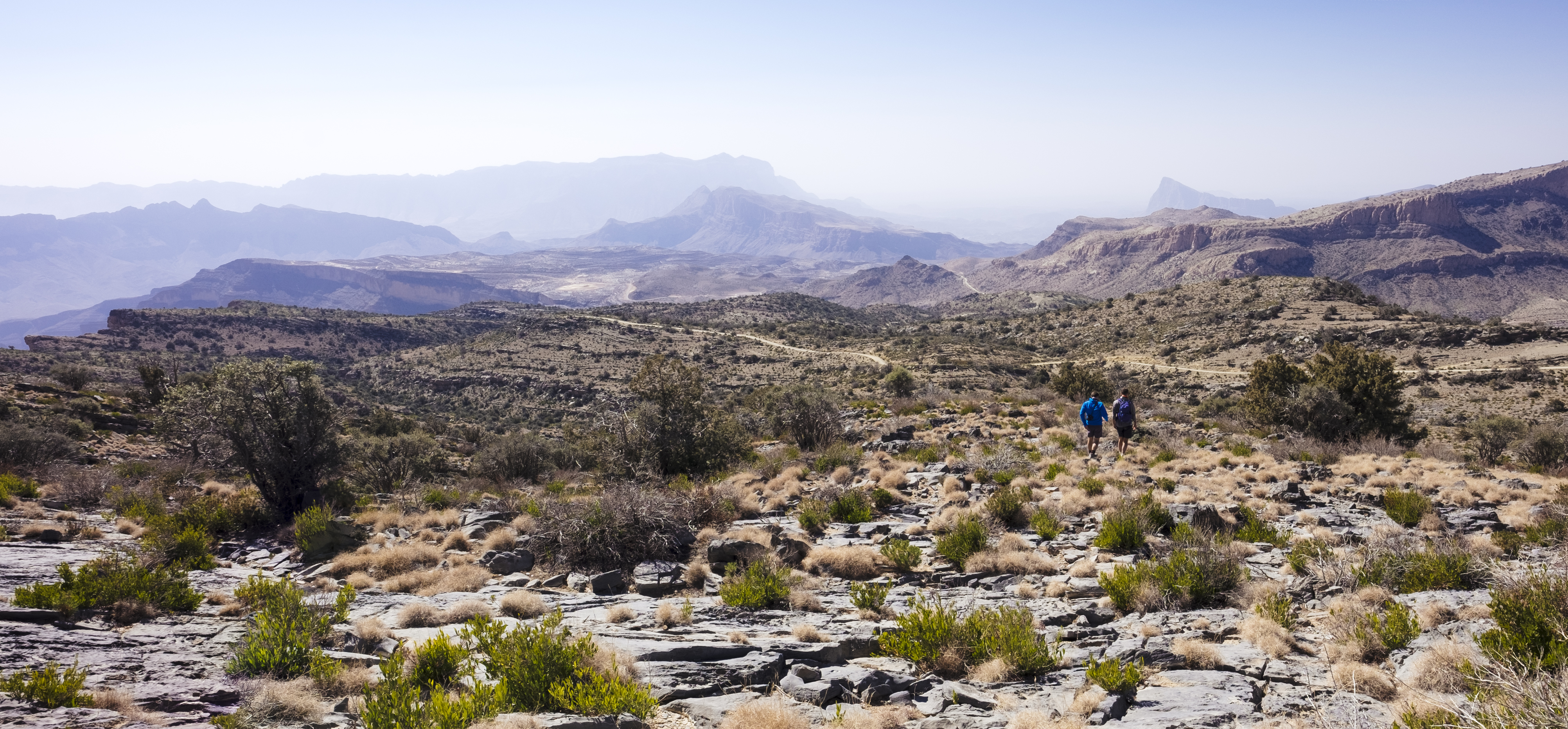
- Jebel Shams in Oman

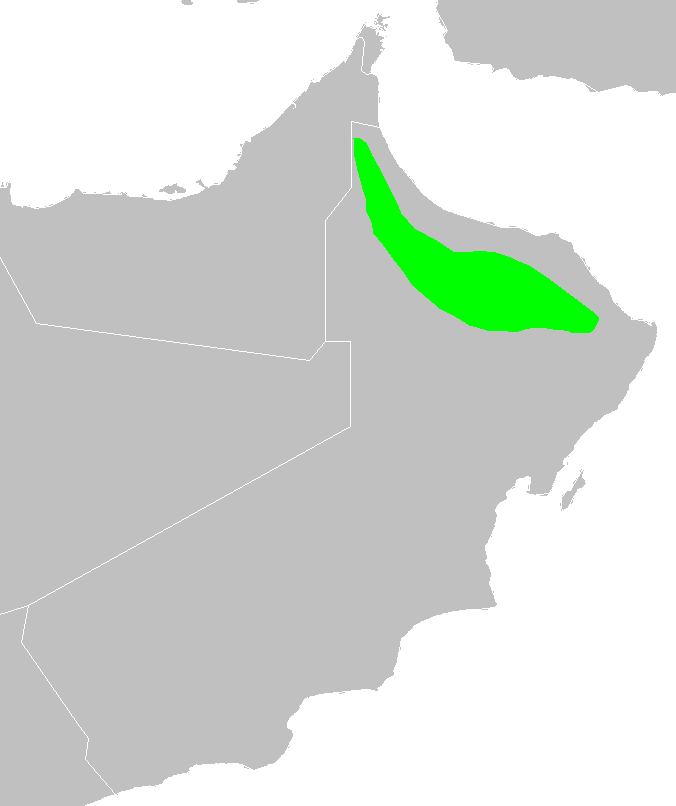
- Al-Hajar Montane Woodlands and Shrublands Ecoregion (green).

Ecology
- Realm: Afrotropical
- Biome: temperate grasslands, savannas and shrublands
- Borders: Gulf of Oman desert and semi-desert

Geography
- Area: 25,604 km^{2} (9,886 sq mi)
- Countries: Oman; United Arab Emirates

Conservation
- Conservation status: Critical/endangered
- Protected: 1.27%

Al Hajar montane woodlands is a temperate grasslands, savannas and shrublands ecoregion in the Hajar Mountains of the eastern part of the Arabian Peninsula, which extends across portions of Oman and the U.A.E.

== Geography ==
The ecoregion includes the upper elevations of the Hajar Mountains. The mountains form an arc from northwest to southeast through portions of Oman and the U.A.E., extending over 500 kilometres (310 miles) in length. The mountains run parallel to the coast of the Gulf of Oman, with the Al Batinah Region in the coastal plain between the mountains and the sea.

Al Hajar al Gharbi, or the Western Hajar, extend from the Musandam Peninsula at the northeastern tip of Arabia, through the eastern UAE and northern Oman. Al Hajar ash Sharqi, or the Eastern Hajar, extends eastwards towards Ras al Hadd, the easternmost point in Oman and Arabia. The Sama'il Gap separates the eastern and western portions of the range. The limestone massifs of Jebel Shams (2,997 m (9,833 ft)) and Jebel Akhdar (2,980 m (9,780 ft)), located just west of the Sumail Gap, are the highest peaks in the range. The highest peak in the eastern Hajar is 2,152 metres (7,060 feet).

The mountains are composed mostly of Cretaceous limestone, together with outcrops of metamorphic and igneous rocks, including grey-brown ophiolites. The Gulf of Oman desert and semi-desert ecoregion surrounds the montane woodlands at lower elevations.

== Climate ==
The ecoregion has a semi-arid temperate climate, transitioning to subtropical at lower elevations. The coolest months are December through March, when the mountains receive thunderstorms, rain, hailstorms and occasional snow, particularly at higher elevations. April to September are warmer, with occasional rainstorms brought by the Indian Ocean monsoons.

== Flora ==
The natural vegetation types include shrubland and open woodland and the flora varies with elevation and underlying geology.

Open woodlands with Olea europaea, Sideroxylon mascatense and Dodonaea viscosa extend from 1,100 to 2,500 metres elevation. Ziziphus spina-christi, Prosopis cineraria, Vachellia tortilis and Ficus salicifolia and other species of fig are found in seasonal watercourses (wadis). Euphorbia larica predominates on steep slopes, along with Vachellia tortilis, V. gerrardi, and Periploca aphylla.

Montane woodlands occur on the high peaks between 2,100 and 3,000 metres elevation. Juniperus seravschanica is the characteristic tree, sometimes mixed with Olea europaea.

On the Musandam Peninsula, semi-evergreen woodlands above 1,300 metres elevation were formerly dominated by Sideroxylon mascatense, but now Dodonaea viscosa is predominant in the degraded woodlands. Between 1,800 and 2,000 metres elevation, Prunus arabica forms woodlands with Ephedra pachyclada and a dense ground layer of the shrub Artemisia sieberi.

Ceratonia oreothauma subsp. oreothauma is an endemic subspecies of the tree found only in a single valley on Jebel Aswad in the eastern Hajar. The other subspecies occurs in Somalia.

Endemic and near-endemic species include Herniaria maskatensis, Pteropyrum scoparium, Rumex limoniastrum, Dionysia mira, Tephrosia haussknechtii, Searsia aucheri, Polygala mascatensis, Convolvulus ulicinus, Teucrium mascatense, Verbascum akdarense, Iphiona horrida, Schweinfurthia imbricata, and Ziziphus hajarensis. Wider-ranging native species include Limonium axillare, Ochradiscus aucheri, Sideroxylon mascatense, Convolvulus virgatus, Salvia macilenta, Viola cinerea, Cometes surattensis, Capparis spinosa var. mucronifolia, Cleome rupicola, Ebenus stellata, Taverniera glabra, Barleria aucheriana, and Pluchea arabica. Many species are shared with the South Iran Nubo–Sindian desert and semi-desert ecoregion to the north across the Persian Gulf and Gulf of Oman.

== Fauna ==
The Arabian tahr (Arabitragus jayakari) is endemic to the region. Other large mammals occur in small numbers, including the Mountain gazelle (Gazella gazella), particularly in the Wadi Sareen Reserve, Arabian wolf (Canis lupus arabs), striped hyena (Hyaena hyaena) and Arabian wildcat (Felis lybica lybica).

Five species of lizards are endemic to the mountains – Emirati leaf-toed gecko (Asaccus caudivolvulus), Gallagher's gecko (Asaccus gallagheri), Oman rock gecko (Pristurus celerrimus), Jayakar lizard (Omanosaura jayakari) and Blue-tailed lizard (Omanosaura cyanura). Asaccus montanus, Asaccus platyrhynchus and Pristurus gallagheri are lizards endemic to Oman which live in the mountains.

71 bird species have been recorded around the Jebel Akdar, including 28 residents and 41 migrants. Resident birds include lappet-faced vulture (Torgos tracheliotus), Arabian partridge (Alectoris melanocephala), sand partridge (Ammoperdix heyi), pallid scops owl (Otus brucei), hooded wheatear (Oenanthe monacha) and Hume's wheatear (Oenanthe alboniger).

== Conservation and threats ==
The ecoregion is threatened by overgrazing from camels, goats and feral donkeys. Overgrazing has limited the ability of the Ceratonia woodlands and juniper woodlands below 2,400 metres to regenerate.

== Protected areas ==
1.27% of the ecoregion is in protected areas. Protected areas include Hatta Protected Area, 28 km^{2} (11 sq mi), in the United Arab Emirates, and Al Sareen Nature Reserve, 780.49 km^{2} (301.35 sq mi), and Al Jabal Al Akhdar Scenic Reserve, 296 km^{2} (114 sq mi), in Oman.

== See also ==
- Middle East
- Persian Gulf
