= Asaccus saffinae =

Scientific classification
- Kingdom: Animalia
- Phylum: Chordata
- Class: Reptilia
- Order: Squamata
- Suborder: Gekkota
- Family: Phyllodactylidae
- Genus: Asaccus
- Species: A. saffinae

Binomial name
- Asaccus saffinae Afrasiab & Mohamad, 2009

Species of lizard

Asaccus saffinae, the Mount Saffine leaf-toed gecko is a species of lizard belonging to the family Phyllodactylidae, the leaf-toed geckos. It is endemic to Iraq.

== Taxonomy ==
Asaccus saffinae was first formally described in 2009 by the Iraqi zoologists Saman R. Afrasiab and Sarbaz I. Mohamad with its type locality given as Shera Swar Cave in the Saffine Mountain near Irbil, Kurdistan of Iraq at 44°45’N, 36°37’E. Asaccus saffinae, is a mameber of the genus Asaccuswhich was originally described in 1973 by the American herpetologists James R. Dixon and Steven C. Anderson with Phyllodactylus elisae as its type species. The genus Asaccus is classified within the family Phyllodactylidae in the suborder Gekkota, the geckos, of the order Squamata, the lizards and snakes. Some authorities consider A. saffinae to be a synonym of A. griseonotus.

== Etymology ==
Asaccus saffinae, is a mameber of the genus Asaccus, an name which means "withous sac", an alluion to the ansence of a cloacal sac in A. elisae. The specific name , saffinae, means "of Saffine", the type locality being on Saffine Mountain in Iraqi Kurdistan.

== Description ==
Asaccus saffinae is a comparatively small member of its genus. It has smooth scales on its back and separate scales on the lower jaw behind the chin. The tubercles are not keeled and are smaller than half of the diameter of the ear opening, lamellae equal in size to the diameter of the ear opening. There are nine indistinct dark bars on the tail and six blotches on the back. There are no cloacal sacs, which is typical for this genus. The body is relatively thin. The original authors compares this species to A. kermanshahensis and highlighted the differences but later authors have found that this taxon falls within the variation of A. griseonotus, hence their proposal of synonymy.

== Distribution ==
Asaccus saffinae is endemic to Iraq where it is only known from its type locality, the Shera Swar Cave in the Saffine Mountain near Irbil.
