= Hemidactylus luqueorum =

Scientific classification
- Kingdom: Animalia
- Phylum: Chordata
- Class: Reptilia
- Order: Squamata
- Suborder: Gekkota
- Family: Gekkonidae
- Genus: Hemidactylus
- Species: H. luqueorum

Binomial name
- Hemidactylus luqueorum Carranza & Arnold, 2012

Species of lizard

Hemidactylus luqueorum is a species of house gecko endemic to Oman. The specific epithet luqueorum honors Maria Teresa Luque and her family.

Hemidactylus luqueorum is found in the western Hajar Mountains in northern Oman at 492–2,200 m (1,614–7,218 ft) above sea level.
