= Asaccus arnoldi =

Scientific classification
- Kingdom: Animalia
- Phylum: Chordata
- Class: Reptilia
- Order: Squamata
- Suborder: Gekkota
- Family: Phyllodactylidae
- Genus: Asaccus
- Species: A. arnoldi

Binomial name
- Asaccus arnoldi Simó-Riudalbas, Tarroso, Papenfuss, Al-Sariri & Carranza, 2017

Species of lizard

Asaccus arnoldi is a species of lizard in the family Phyllodactylidae. It, along with all other species in the genus Asaccus, is endemic to the Hajar Mountains of northern Oman.

== Taxonomy ==
Asaccas arnoldi was first formally named in 2017. The specific name, arnoldi, is in honor of British herpetologist Edwin Nicholas "Nick" Arnold.

== Description ==
Asaccus arnoldi is the smallest species in the genus Asaccus. The maximum recorded snout-to-vent length (SVL) of A. arnoldi is only 33.6 mm (1.32 in). It is most closely related to Asaccus gallagheri.
