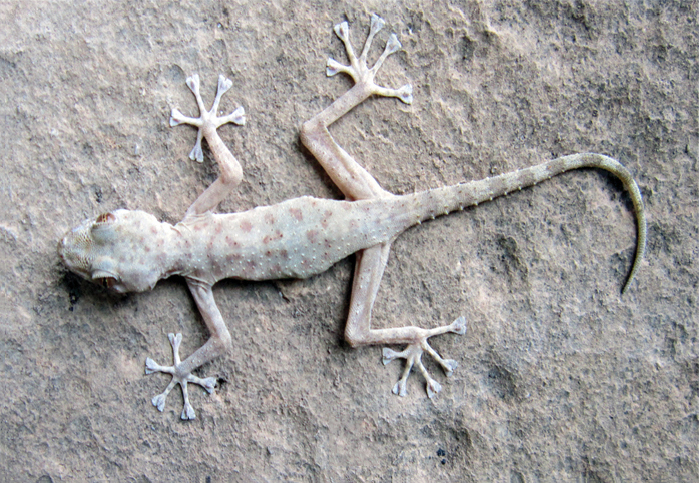

Conservation status
- Least Concern (IUCN 3.1)

Scientific classification
- Kingdom: Animalia
- Phylum: Chordata
- Class: Reptilia
- Order: Squamata
- Suborder: Gekkota
- Family: Phyllodactylidae
- Genus: Asaccus
- Species: A. nasrullahi

Binomial name
- Asaccus nasrullahi Y. Werner, 2006

= Asaccus nasrullahi =

Species of lizard

Asaccus nasrullahi, also known commonly as Nasrullah's leaf-toed gecko, is a species of lizard in the family Phyllodactylidae. The species is endemic to Iran.

== Etymology ==
The specific name, nasrullahi, was chosen in honor of Iranian herpetologist Nasrullah Rastegar-Pouyani, "in recognition of his contribution to the knowledge of the herpetology of Iran, including the genus Asaccus".

== Taxonomy ==
Asaccus nasrullahi was previously misidentified as Ptyodactylus hasselquistii, until it was named as a new species in 2006. The masculine given name, Nasrullah, means "victory of God" which according to taxon author Yehudah L. Werner "seems appropriate for the survival, discovery and rediscovery of this gecko species". In 2014 Kamali et al. considered Asaccus nasrullahi to be a synonym of Asaccus griseonotus.

== Geographic range and habitat ==
Asaccus nasrullahi is found in the Zagros Mountains in rocky valleys dominated by oaks such as Quercus brantii.
