= Magharet Qasir Hafee =

Cave system in UAE

Magharet Qasir Hafee (Arabic: مغارة قصر حفيت) is a cave system in the Hajar Mountains, beyond Buraimi, near Al Ain, UAE. It is the only cave system in the UAE.

== Access ==
Only experienced cavers are allowed access, and it is not open for the general public. The caves network is found on the UAE side of Hajar Mountains.
