= Bab Al Salam Mosque =

Mosque in Muscat, Oman

Religion
- Affiliation: Islam

Location
- Municipality: Muscat
- Country: Oman
- Interactive map of Bab Al Salam Mosque
- Coordinates: 23°38′11″N 58°04′35″E

Architecture
- Type: mosque
- Interior area: 2,000 m^{2}

Bab Al Salam Mosque or Masjid Bab Al Salam is a mosque located in Muscat, Oman. Spread out over an area of 2,000 square meters, the mosque is blush-colored, alluding to the color of the nearby Hajar mountains. The complex comprises five parts— two prayer halls, two ablution spaces, and an open space. There is also a freestanding conical minaret. Instead of the traditional mihrab, a thin floor-to-ceiling window is present, marking the direction toward Mecca.
