= Asaccus andersoni =

Scientific classification
- Kingdom: Animalia
- Phylum: Chordata
- Class: Reptilia
- Order: Squamata
- Suborder: Gekkota
- Family: Phyllodactylidae
- Genus: Asaccus
- Species: A. andersoni

Binomial name
- Asaccus andersoni Torki, Fathinia, Rostami, Gharzi, & Nazari-Serenjeh, 2011

Species of lizard

Asaccus andersoni is a species of leaf-toed gecko endemic to Iran, on the western slopes of the central Zagros Mountains. It lives in on rocks in gullies of mountainous oak forests. It is named in honor of Steven Clement Anderson, in recognition of "his major contributions to the knowledge of the herpetofauna of the Middle East and the Iranian Plateau in particular".

At the type locality, Asaccus andersoni occurred with several other species of lizards and snakes, including Asaccus elisae, Laudakia nupta, Ophisops elegans, and Platyceps najadum.

== Behavior ==
They are nocturnal and exhibit secretive behavior, often hiding under rocks or within crevices furing the day. Such behavior is typical among geckos in arid regions, aiding in thermoregulation and predator avoidance.
