= Hemidactylus masirahensis =

Scientific classification
- Kingdom: Animalia
- Phylum: Chordata
- Class: Reptilia
- Order: Squamata
- Suborder: Gekkota
- Family: Gekkonidae
- Genus: Hemidactylus
- Species: H. masirahensis

Binomial name
- Hemidactylus masirahensis Carranza & Arnold, 2012

Synonyms
- Hemidactylus homoeolepis (partim)

Species of lizard

Hemidactylus masirahensis is a species of house gecko. It is endemic to Masirah Island, off the coast of central Oman.
