= Asaccus gardneri =

Scientific classification
- Kingdom: Animalia
- Phylum: Chordata
- Class: Reptilia
- Order: Squamata
- Suborder: Gekkota
- Family: Phyllodactylidae
- Genus: Asaccus
- Species: A. gardneri

Binomial name
- Asaccus gardneri Carranza, Simo-Riudalbas, Jayasinghe, Wilms, & Els, 2016

Species of lizard

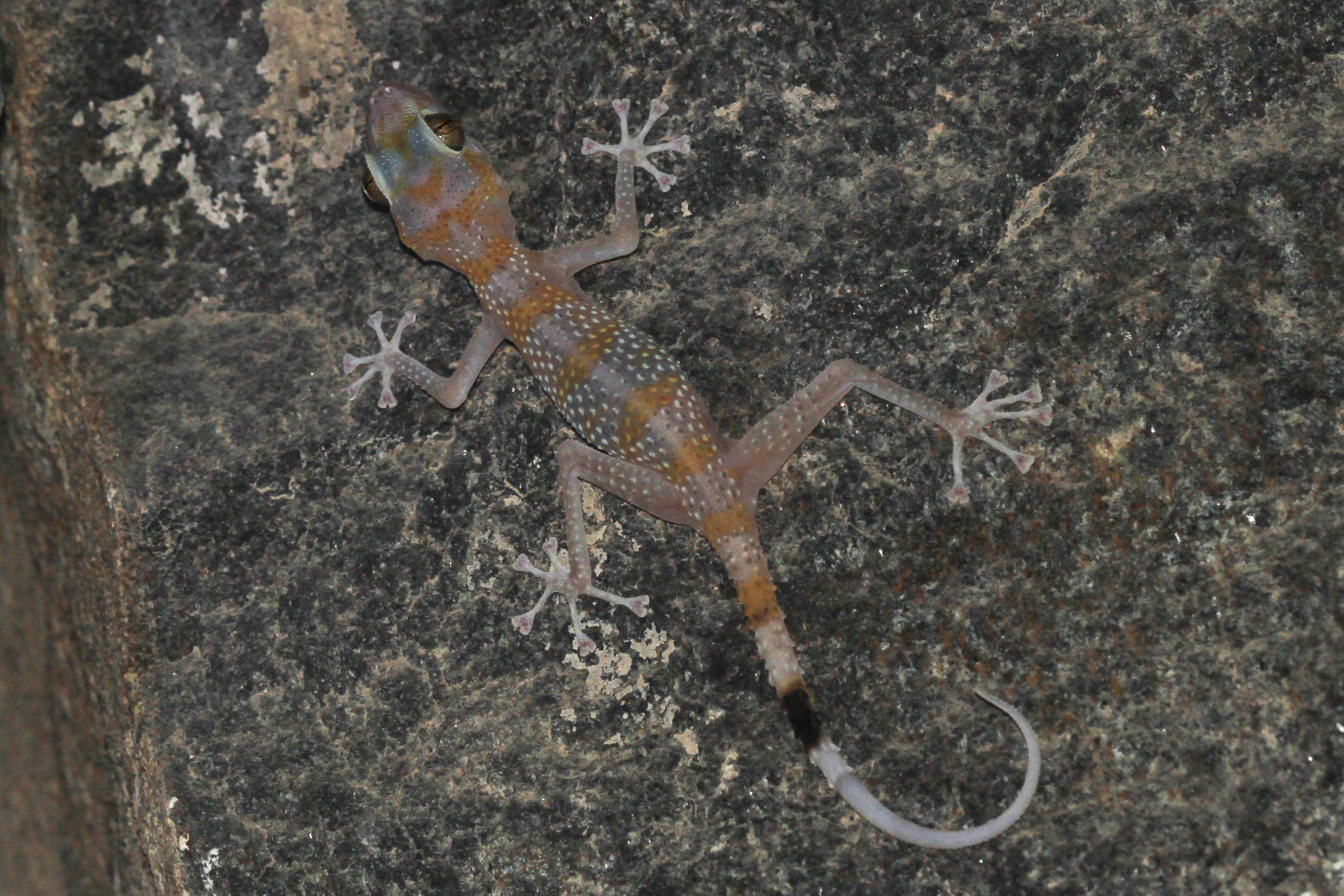
Asaccus gardeneri from Al Hajjar mountains, UAE

Asaccus gardneri, also known as Gardener's leaf-toed gecko, is a species of lizard in the family Phyllodactylidae. It is endemic to the Arabian Peninsula and occurs in the United Arab Emirates and Oman.

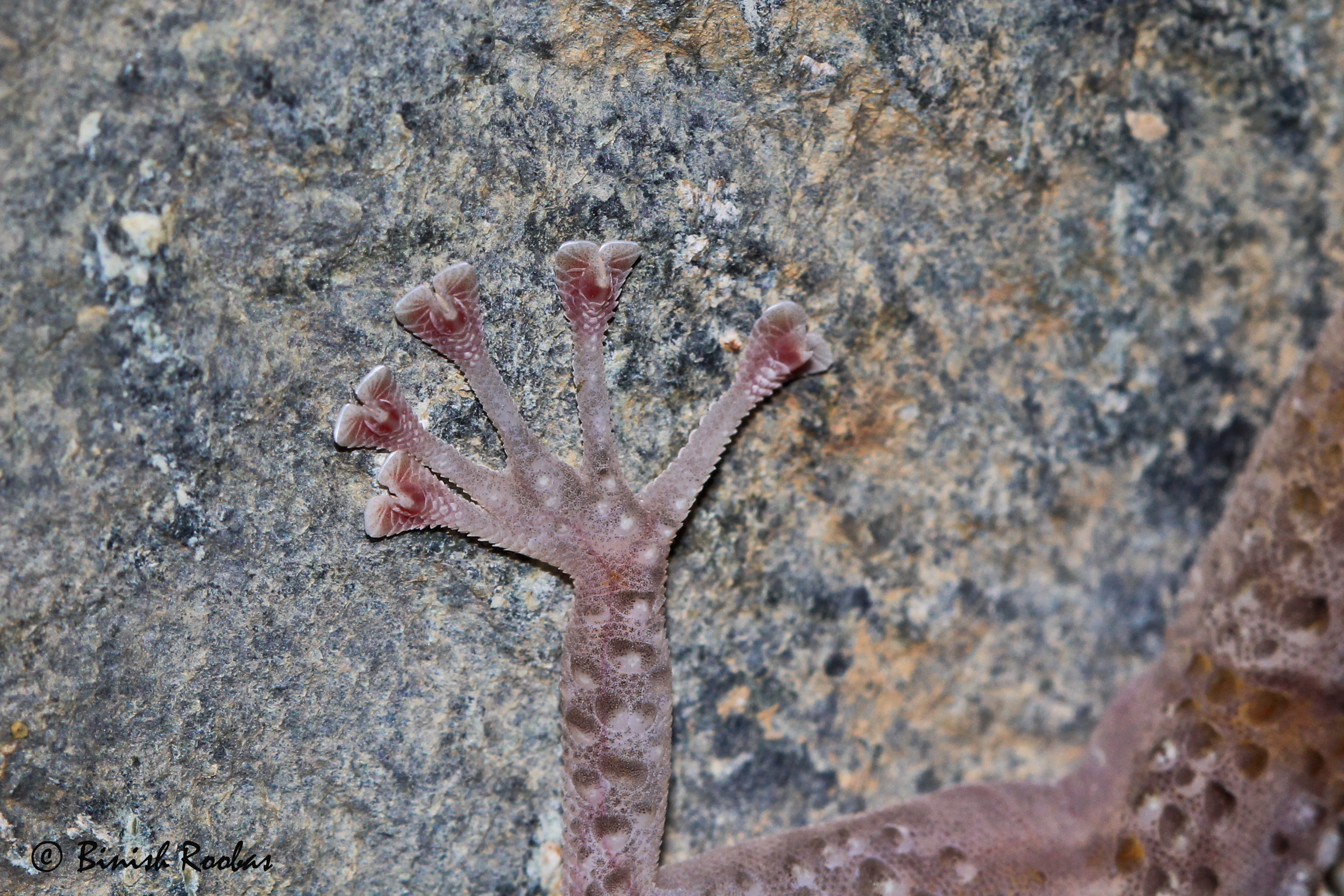
Asaccus gardneri toe pads
