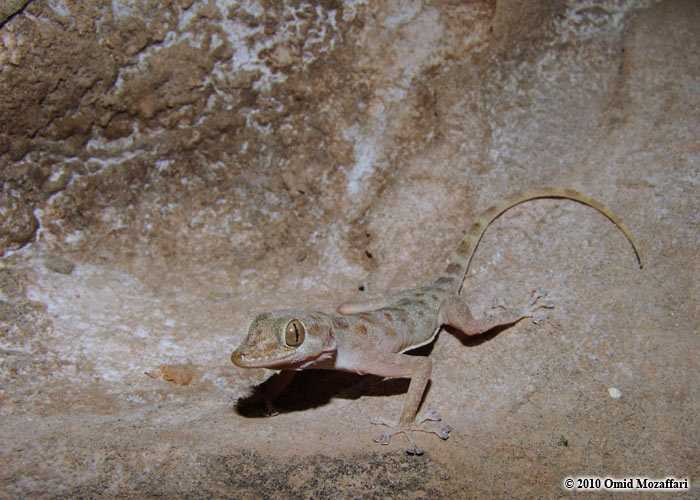
- Asaccus granularis in Mahoor berenji (Dezful, Khuzestan, Iran)

Scientific classification
- Domain: Eukaryota
- Kingdom: Animalia
- Phylum: Chordata
- Class: Reptilia
- Order: Squamata
- Infraorder: Gekkota
- Family: Phyllodactylidae
- Genus: Asaccus
- Species: A. granularis

Binomial name
- Asaccus granularis Torki, 2010

= Asaccus granularis =

Species of lizard

Asaccus granularis is a species of leaf-toed gecko endemic to Iran. The specific epithet refers to the granular scales on the back of this lizard. It is only known from the type locality in Lorestan Province, Iran. It was found in a mountainous area with open oak forests, on rocky outcrops and under large boulders.
