= Omanosaura cyanura =

Conservation status
- Least Concern (IUCN 3.1)

Scientific classification
- Kingdom: Animalia
- Phylum: Chordata
- Class: Reptilia
- Order: Squamata
- Family: Lacertidae
- Genus: Omanosaura
- Species: O. cyanura

Binomial name
- Omanosaura cyanura (Arnold, 1972)

Species of lizard

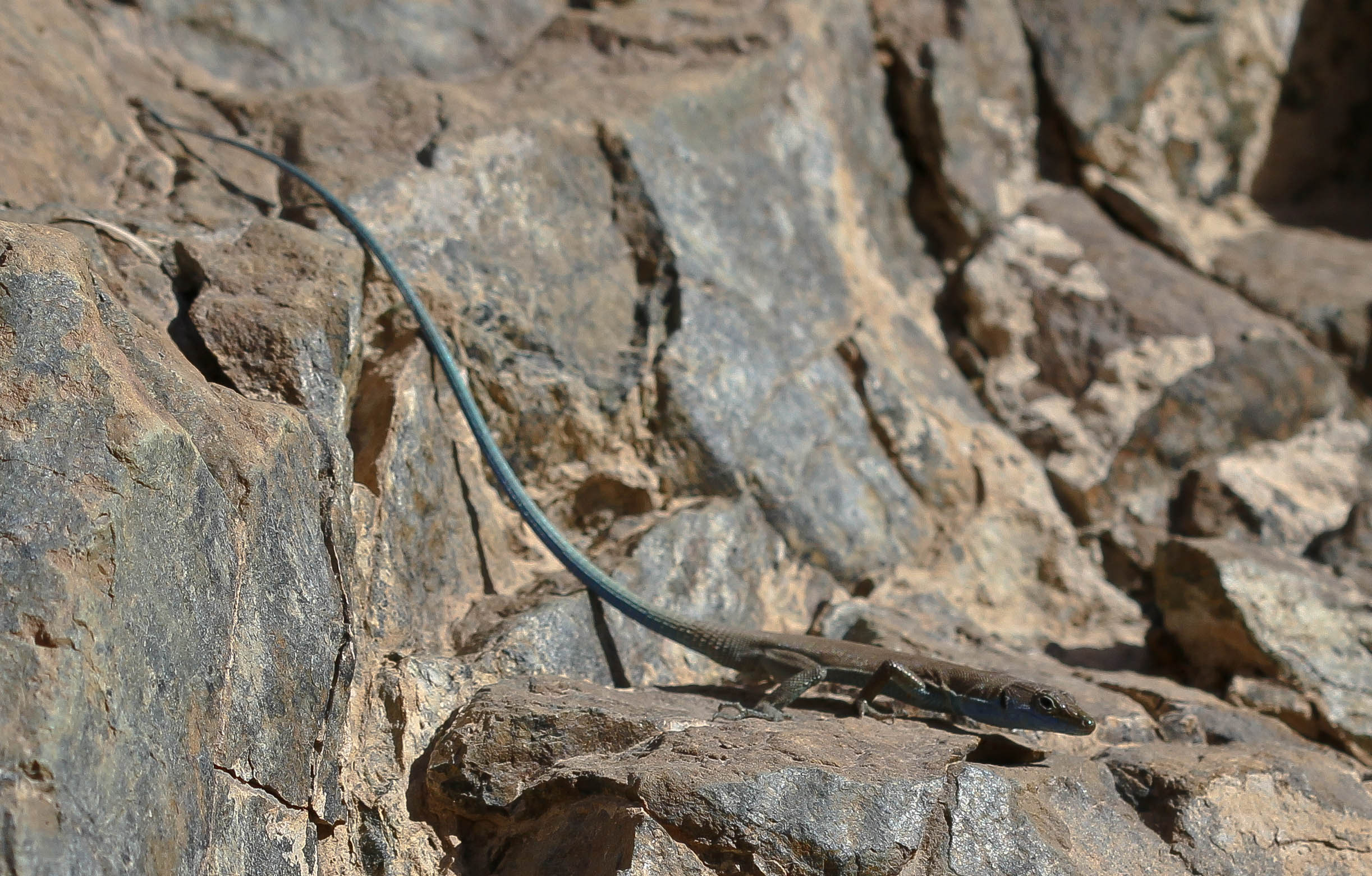
Omanosaura cyanura from United Arab Emirates

Omanosaura cyanura, also known commonly as the blue-tailed lizard and the blue-tailed Oman lizard, is a species of lizard in the family Lacertidae. The species is native to the eastern end of the Arabian Peninsula.

== Geographic range ==
O. cyanura is found in Oman and the United Arab Emirates.

== Habitat ==
O. cyanura has been found living along watercourses which flow down from the Hajar Mountains of northern Oman and the eastern United Arab Emirates, from sea level up to 1,000 m (3,300 ft) elevation.
