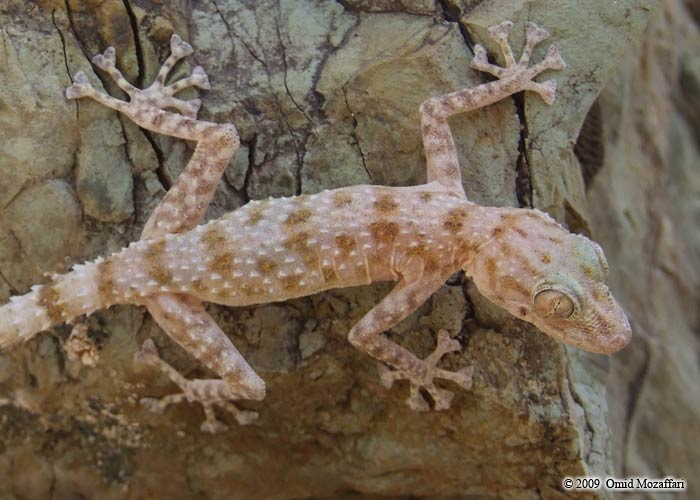
- Asaccus elisae

Scientific classification
- Kingdom: Animalia
- Phylum: Chordata
- Order: Squamata
- Suborder: Gekkota
- Family: Phyllodactylidae
- Genus: Asaccus; Dixon & S. Anderson, 1973

Species
- 18, see text.

= Asaccus =

Genus of geckos

Asaccus is a genus of geckos, commonly known as Southwest Asian leaf-toed geckos, in the family Phyllodactylidae.

== Geographic range ==
The genus Asaccus is endemic to the Middle East.

== Species ==
There are 18 species which are recognized as being valid in the genus Asaccus. Five were described in 2011.

- Asaccus andersoni Torki et al., 2011
- Asaccus arnoldi Simo-Riudalbas, Tarroso, Papenfuss, Al-Sariri, & Carranza, 2017
- Asaccus authenticus Nazarov, Nabizadeh, Rajabizadeh, Melnikov, Volkova, Poyarkov & Rastegar-Pouyani, 2024 – Bandar-e jask leaf-toed gecko
- Asaccus barani Torki et al., 2011
- Asaccus caudivolvulus Arnold & Gardner, 1994 – Emirati leaf-toed gecko
- Asaccus elisae (F. Werner, 1895) – Werner's leaf-toed gecko, Elisa's leaf-toed gecko
- Asaccus gallagheri (Arnold, 1972) – Gallagher's leaf-toed gecko, Gallagher's gecko
- Asaccus gardneri Carranza, Simó-Riudalbas, Jayasinghe, Wilms & Els, 2016
- Asaccus granularis Torki, 2010
- Asaccus griseonotus Dixon & S. Anderson, 1973 – grey-spotted leaf-toed gecko, grey-marked gecko
- Asaccus iranicus Torki et al., 2011
- Asaccus kermanshahensis N. Rastegar-Pouyani, 1996 – Kermanshah leaf-toed gecko
- Asaccus kurdistanensis N. Rastegar-Pouyani, Nilson & Faizi, 2006 - Kurdistan leaf-toed gecko
- Asaccus margaritae Carranza, Simó-Riudalbas, Jayasinghe, Wilms & Els, 2016 - Margarita's leaf-toed gecko
- Asaccus montanus Gardner, 1994 - mountain leaf-toed gecko
- Asaccus nasrullahi Y. Werner, 2006 - Nasrullah's leaf-toed gecko
- Asaccus platyrhynchus Arnold & Gardner, 1994 - flat-snouted leaf-toed gecko
- Asaccus saffinae Afrasiab & Mohamad, 2009
- Asaccus zagrosicus Torki et al., 2011

Nota bene: A binomial authority in parentheses indicates that the species was originally described in a genus other than Asaccus.
