= Arnold's leaf-toed gecko =

Conservation status
- Data Deficient (IUCN 3.1)

Scientific classification
- Kingdom: Animalia
- Phylum: Chordata
- Class: Reptilia
- Order: Squamata
- Suborder: Gekkota
- Family: Gekkonidae
- Genus: Hemidactylus
- Species: H. arnoldi

Binomial name
- Hemidactylus arnoldi Lanza, 1978
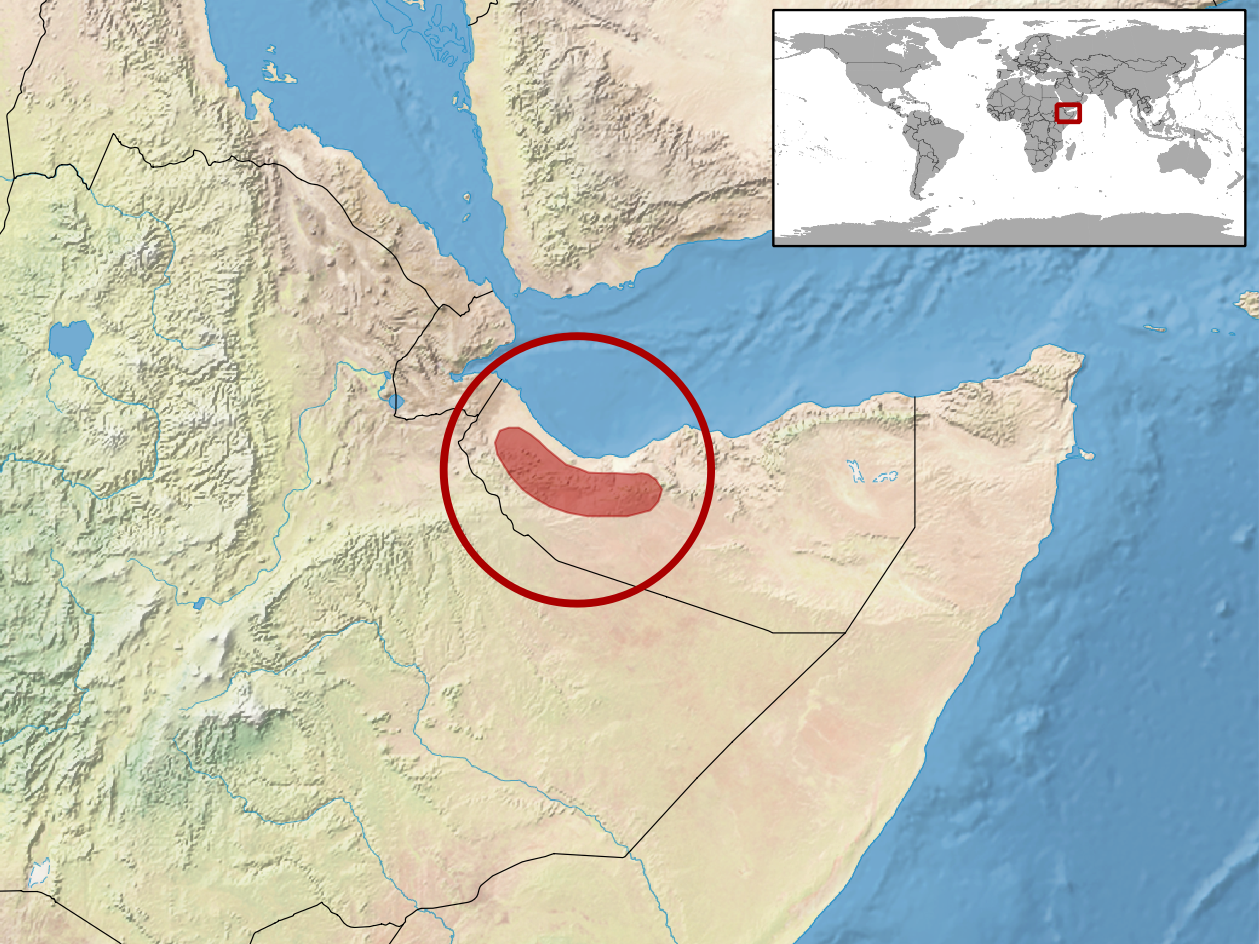

Species of lizard

Arnold's leaf-toed gecko (Hemidactylus arnoldi) is a species of lizard in the family Gekkonidae. The species is endemic to Somalia.

== Etymology ==
The specific name, arnoldi, is in honor of British herpetologist Edwin Nicholas "Nick" Arnold.

== Geographic range ==
H. arnoldi is found in northwestern Somalia.

== Habitat ==
The preferred habitats of H. arnoldi are rocky areas and shrubland, at an altitude of 500 m (1,600 ft).

== Description ==
H. arnoldi is large for its genus, and it is stout. The holotype, an adult female, has a snout-to-vent length (SVL) of 8.2 cm (3.2 in).

== Reproduction ==
H. arnoldi is oviparous.
