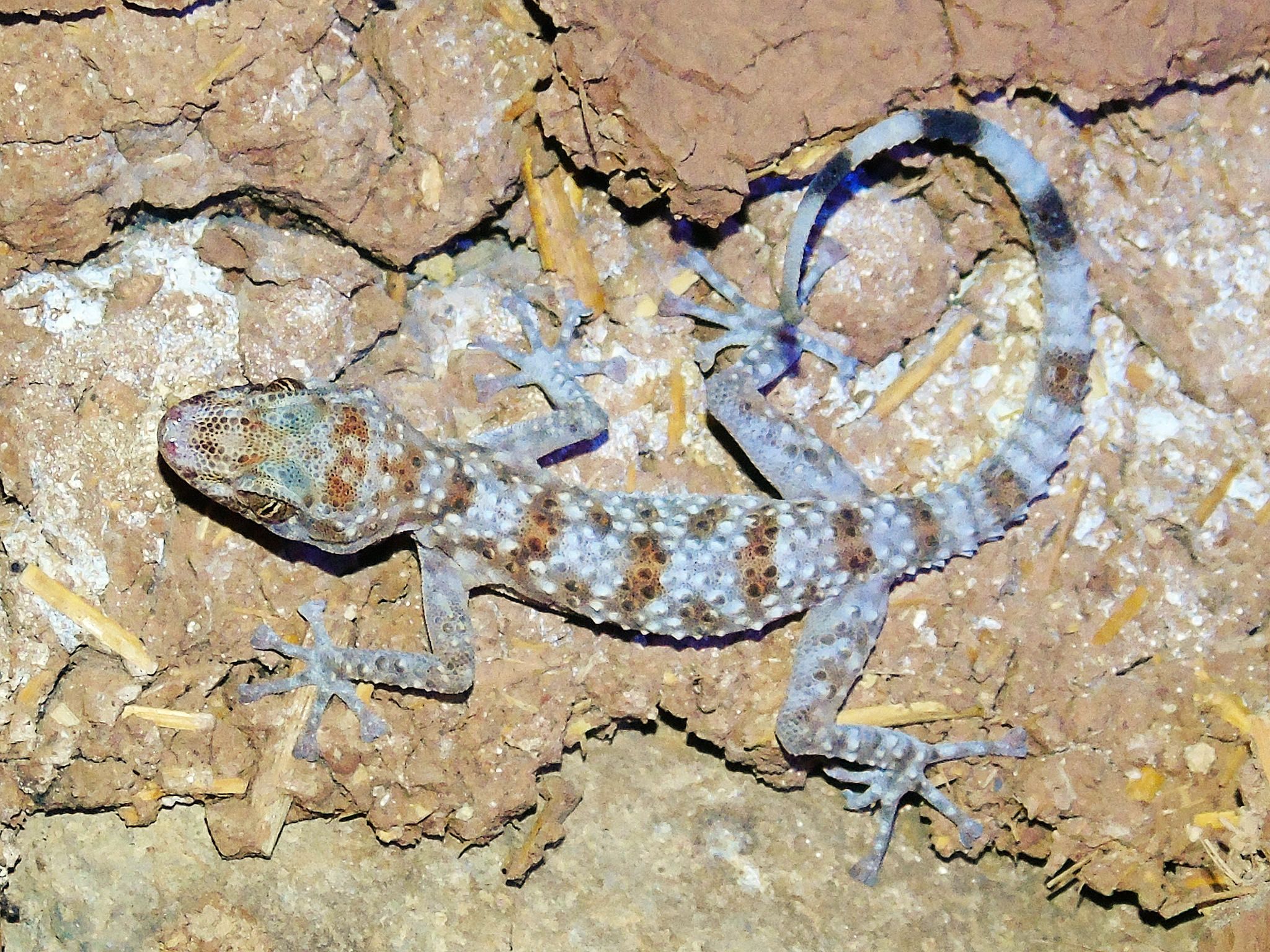

Scientific classification
- Domain: Eukaryota
- Kingdom: Animalia
- Phylum: Chordata
- Class: Reptilia
- Order: Squamata
- Infraorder: Gekkota
- Family: Phyllodactylidae
- Genus: Asaccus
- Species: A. barani

Binomial name
- Asaccus barani Torki, Ahmadzadeh, Ilgaz, Avci, & Kumlutas, 2011

= Asaccus barani =

Species of lizard

Asaccus barani is a species of lizard in the family Phyllodactylidae. It is endemic to Turkey.
