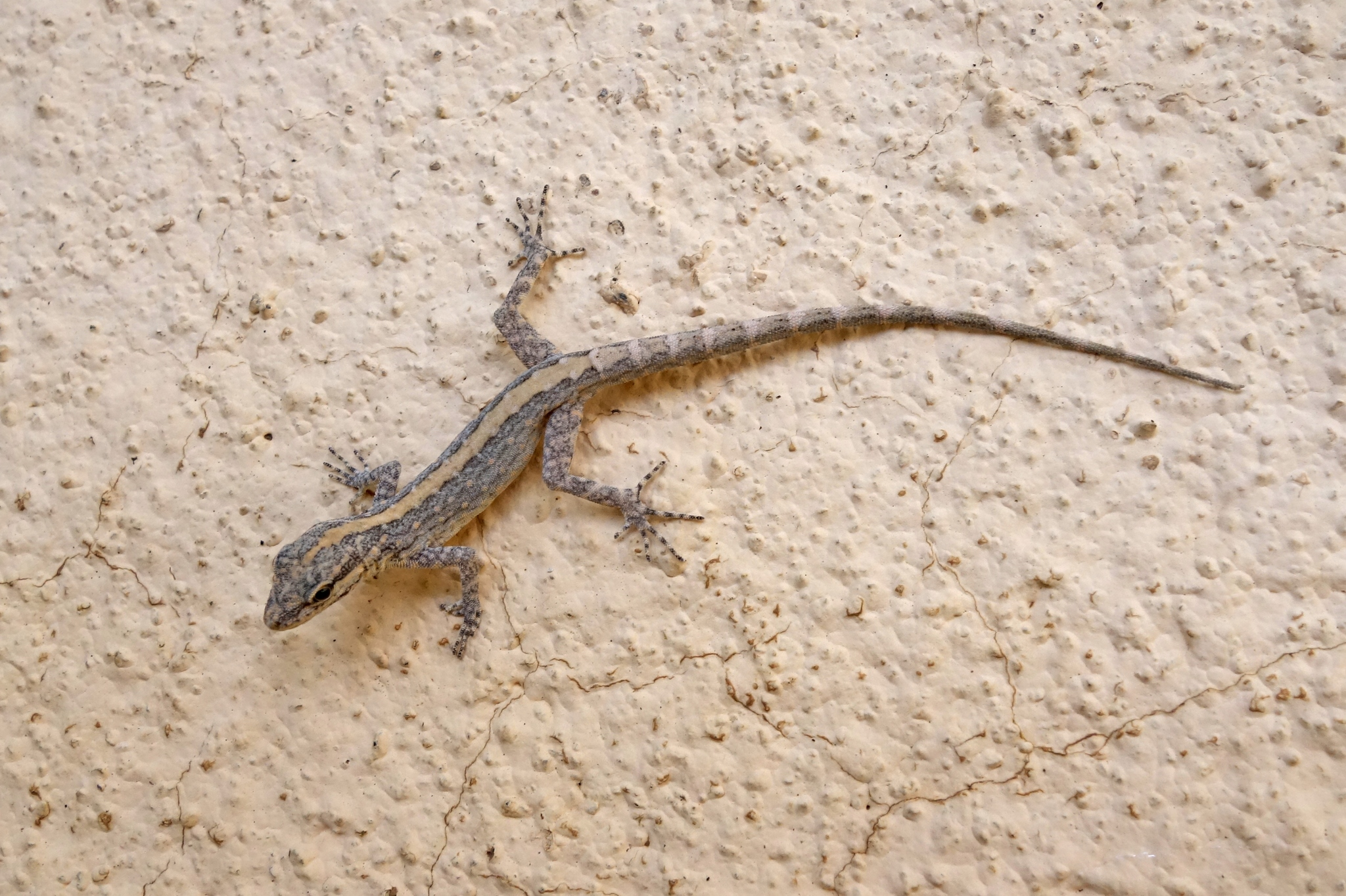

Conservation status
- Near Threatened (IUCN 3.1)

Scientific classification
- Kingdom: Animalia
- Phylum: Chordata
- Class: Reptilia
- Order: Squamata
- Suborder: Gekkota
- Family: Sphaerodactylidae
- Genus: Pristurus
- Species: P. gallagheri

Binomial name
- Pristurus gallagheri Arnold, 1986

= Pristurus gallagheri =

Species of lizard

Pristurus gallagheri, also known as Gallagher's rock gecko or Wadi Kharrar rock gecko , is a species of lizard in the family Sphaerodactylidae found in Oman.

It is native to the central Hajar Mountains of northern Oman, up to 1,830 metres elevation. It has been observed on the trunks and branches of trees, including Moringa peregrina, Ficus salicifolia, and Acacia trees, and on the walls and doors of structures. It is locally abundant within its limited range.
