= Asaccus iranicus =

Scientific classification
- Domain: Eukaryota
- Kingdom: Animalia
- Phylum: Chordata
- Class: Reptilia
- Order: Squamata
- Infraorder: Gekkota
- Family: Phyllodactylidae
- Genus: Asaccus
- Species: A. iranicus

Binomial name
- Asaccus iranicus Torki, Ahmadzadeh, Ilgaz, Avci, & Kumlutas, 2011

Species of lizard

Asaccus iranicus is a species of lizard in the family Phyllodactylidae. It is endemic to Iran.
