= Asaccus kurdistanensis =

Conservation status
- Least Concern (IUCN 3.1)

Scientific classification
- Kingdom: Animalia
- Phylum: Chordata
- Class: Reptilia
- Order: Squamata
- Suborder: Gekkota
- Family: Phyllodactylidae
- Genus: Asaccus
- Species: A. kurdistanensis

Binomial name
- Asaccus kurdistanensis Rastegar-Pouyani, Nilson & Faizl, 2006

Species of lizard

The Kurdistan leaf-toed gecko (Asaccus kurdistanensis) is a species of lizard belonging to the gecko family Phyllodactylidae. A. kurdistanensis is native to the Kurdistan province in western Iran and was described in 2006.
