= Asaccus zagrosicus =

Scientific classification
- Kingdom: Animalia
- Phylum: Chordata
- Class: Reptilia
- Order: Squamata
- Suborder: Gekkota
- Family: Phyllodactylidae
- Genus: Asaccus
- Species: A. zagrosicus

Binomial name
- Asaccus zagrosicus Torki, Ahmadzadeh, Ilgaz, Avci, & Kumlutaş, 2011

Species of lizard

Asaccus zagrosicus is a species of leaf-toed gecko endemic to Iran. The holotype was collected in 2008 in southern Lorestan in the Tang-e-Haft Region between the central Zagros Mountains and Khuzestan Plain.

It is a medium-sized Asaccus species at 44–55 mm (1.7–2.2 in) in length. Males were slightly longer than females. Females were gravid in spring and summer. Asaccus zagrosicus is distinguished from other similar species by a combination of the following: secondary postmental scales not in contact with the lowerlabials; scansors not extending beyond the claws, body size may be greater than 40 mm (1.6 in) in length.

This species of Asaccus feeds on small insects including larva. It was observed as active at night and during the day, only inside of tunnels in the Tang-e-Haft region. Other reptiles co-occurring with Asaccus zagrosicus were Hemidactylus sp., Cyrtopodion scabrum, and Pseudocerastes persicus fieldi.
