= Hajar Mountains =

Mountain range in Oman and the UAE

- Oman Mountains; Rocky Mountains; Stone Mountains; Asabon Mountains
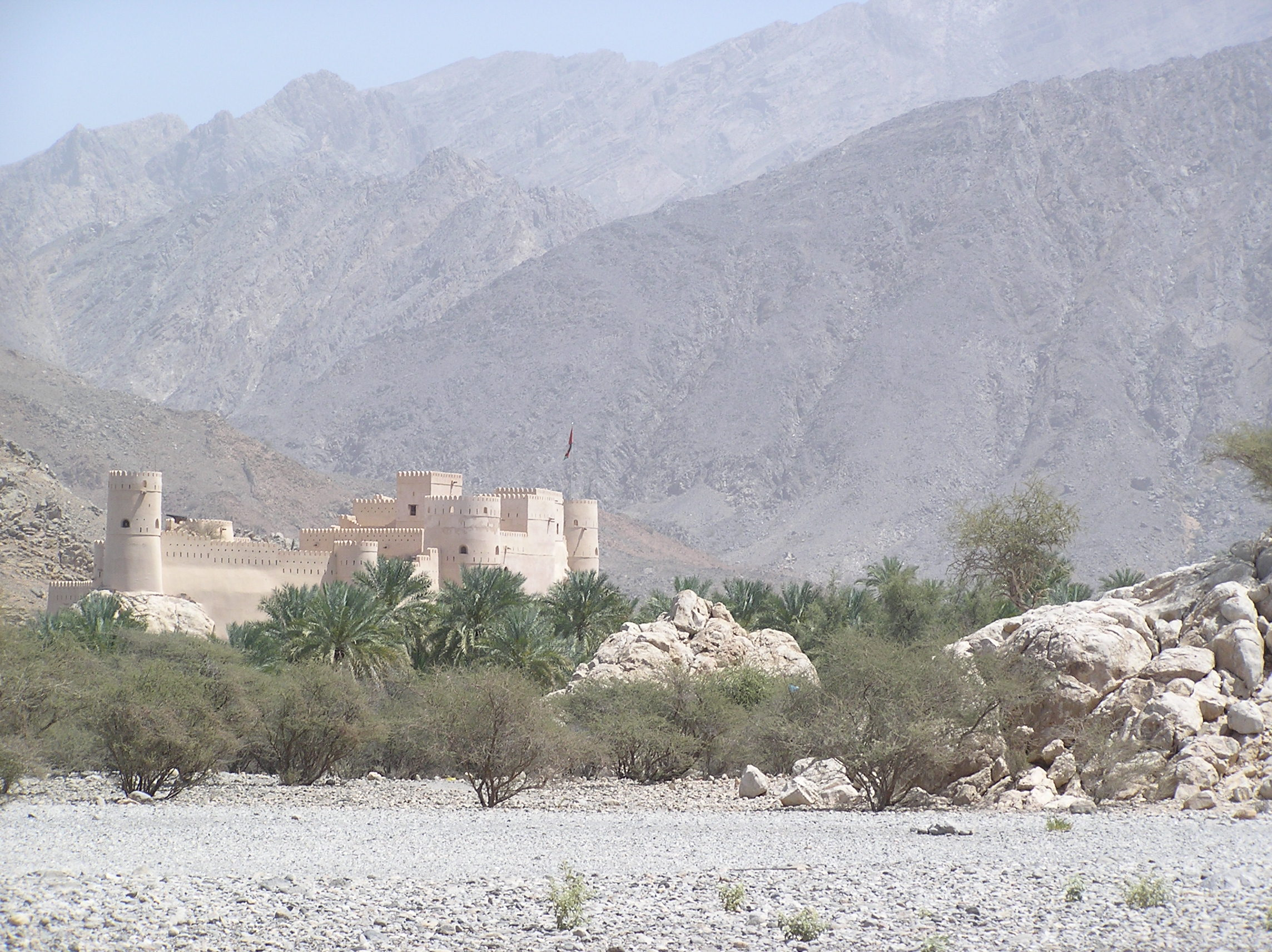
- The Central-Western Hajar rising behind Nakhal Fort, Al Batinah South Governorate, Oman

Highest point
- Peak: Jebel Shams, Oman
- Elevation: 3,018 m (9,902 ft)

Naming
- Native name: Jibāl al-Ḥajar (جِبَال ٱلْحَجَر (Arabic))

Geography
- Location within Oman Location within Middle East Location within West and Central Asia

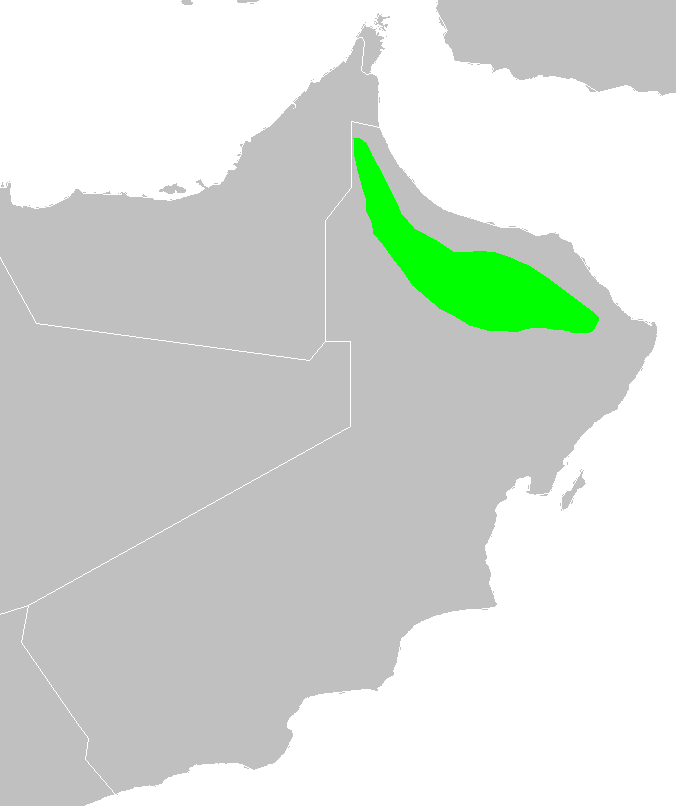
- Countries: Oman and United Arab Emirates
- Region: Asia
- Range coordinates: 23.3°N 57.1°E

The Hajar Mountains (Arabic: جِبَال ٱلْحَجَر, romanized: Jibāl al-Ḥajar, The Rocky Mountains or The Stone Mountains) are one of the highest mountain ranges in the Arabian Peninsula, shared between northern Oman and eastern United Arab Emirates. Also known as "Oman Mountains", they separate the low coastal plain of Oman from the high desert plateau, and lie 50–100 km (31–62 miles) inland from the Gulf of Oman.

== Geology ==
Topographic map of the Hajar Mountains with tectonic and geological localities

=== Orography and tectonic setting ===
The Hajar Mountains extend for 700 kilometres (430 miles) through the UAE and Oman. They are located on the north-east corner of the Arabian Plate, reaching from the Musandam Peninsula through to the east coast of Oman. The range is about 100 km (62 mi) wide, with Jabal Shams being the highest peak at 3,009 m (9,872 ft) in the central region of the mountains.

Currently, the Arabian Plate is moving north relative to the Eurasian Plate at 2–3 cm (0.79–1.18 in) per year. Continental collision is occurring at the Zagros fold and thrust belt west of the Musandam Peninsula. This collisional plate boundary transitions into a subduction zone, towards the east. Here, oceanic crust of the Arabian Plate is subducted northwards beneath Eurasia, called the Makran subduction zone.

=== Formation ===
The Hajar Mountains are the product of polyphase mountain building. Uplift and deformation of the Arabian passive margin began during the late cretaceous as the African-Arabian Plate began to subduct under the South Tethyan Oceanic Plate imitated at an intra oceanic subduction zone. This initiation may have been the result of plate rotation due to the breakup of Gondwana.

Similar to the modern convergence of the Australian passive margin under Eurasian oceanic crust, Arabian passive margin sediments became highly deformed and shortened forming an imbricated thrust belt. This also coincided with the emplacement of the Semail Ophiolite. By the early Maastrichtian, deformation ceased, and stable continental shelf conditions resumed.

A second episode of deformation began during the Eocene Epoch around 45-40 Ma. This episode saw the reactivation of cretaceous thrust faults and the development of long and short wavelength folding of Paleocene marine sediments that infilled previous foredeep accommodation. Low temperature thermodchronometry of apatite grains has given ages to this deformation and subsequent exhumation of the mountain belt. Exhumation occurred in two states, first between 45 and 40 Ma and again from 20 to 15 Ma. This later unroofing could also be related to tectonic uplift in the nearby Zagros Mountains of Iran.

=== Lithology ===
The geology of the Hajar can be grouped into four major tectonostratigraphic groups. Group one are the pre-Permian basement rocks, a sedimentary sequence of clastics, carbonates and evaporites. Group two are a middle Permian to Late Cretaceous sequence of continental shelf carbonates, which were deposited unconformably above the basement. Group three are a series of nappes (allochthonous rocks) that were transported from the northeast to the southwest horizontally for more than 300 km (190 mi). This was a major tectonic event during the late Cretaceous. This process is called obduction, where Permian to middle Cretaceous continental slope-rise (shallow to deep marine) sedimentary rocks and late Cretaceous oceanic crust (Semail ophiolite) were thrust (obducted) above the rocks from groups one and two. Lastly, group four are late Cretaceous to Miocene shallow marine and terrestrial sedimentary rocks that were deposited on top of all three previous groups.

=== Structures ===
The high topography is around two major culminations: Jabal Akhdar and Saih Hatat, which are large scale anticlines. The Saih Hatat culmination contains eclogite in the northeast at As Sifah. These rocks were subducted to about 80 km (50 mi) depth into the mantle, and then exhumed back to the surface. This exhumation event created possibly the largest megasheath fold on Earth, the Wadi Mayh megasheath fold. The common view is that these eclogites were originally basic volcanic rocks within the leading edge of the continental crust of the Arabian Plate. This leading edge was then subducted by a NE-dipping subduction zone. However, some geologists have interpreted that these eclogites were subducted through a SW-dipping subduction zone.

The two culminations are separated by the Semail Gap. This is a prominent linear structure, trending NNE—SSW. However, it is still debated as to what this structure is. Different geologists claim that it is a left-lateral (sinistral) strike-slip fault, a normal fault, a lateral ramp, a monocline due to a blind thrust, or a fault with multiple phases of deformation.

There is some debate over whether the topography of the Hajar Mountains is due to thin or thick-skinned tectonics (if basement rocks were faulted during collision to create uplift due to thrust faults). Recent Bouguer gravity and magnetotelluric geophysical data suggest deep basement faults that have been activated as thrust faults during the collisional event that obducted the Semail Ophiolite. This has resulted in a much shallower depth to basement in the Hajar Mountains and a deeper depth to basement in the foreland basin to the west. This has implications on economic geology such as the mining for precious minerals and the extraction of oil and gas.

=== Modern topography ===
The late Cretaceous obduction event created the proto-Hajar Mountains. However, this topography subsided and shallow marine sedimentation covered the region, beginning in the Paleocene. Paleocene to Eocene sedimentary rocks are found at 2,200 m (7,200 ft) above sea level within the Hajar, and are folded. This indicates that the present day topography formed after the late Eocene. The exact timing is debated, and various interpretations indicate the topography formed anywhere between the late Eocene through to the Miocene.

The driving forces that formed the Hajar is also debated. Many geologists relate the Zagros Collision as the reason for the uplift forming the mountains, as currently the Musandam Peninsula (northwest corner of the mountain range) is uplifting due to this collision. However, Jabal Shams, the highest peak of the central mountains is over 300 km (190 mi) away from this zone. In addition, there is no major seismicity within the central mountains, indicating that the mountains are not currently deforming, even though the Zagros collision is. This indicates that the uplift that created the present day topography occurred in the past, possibly before the initiation of the Zagros collision, by a mechanism that is not fully understood.

=== Geoconservation ===
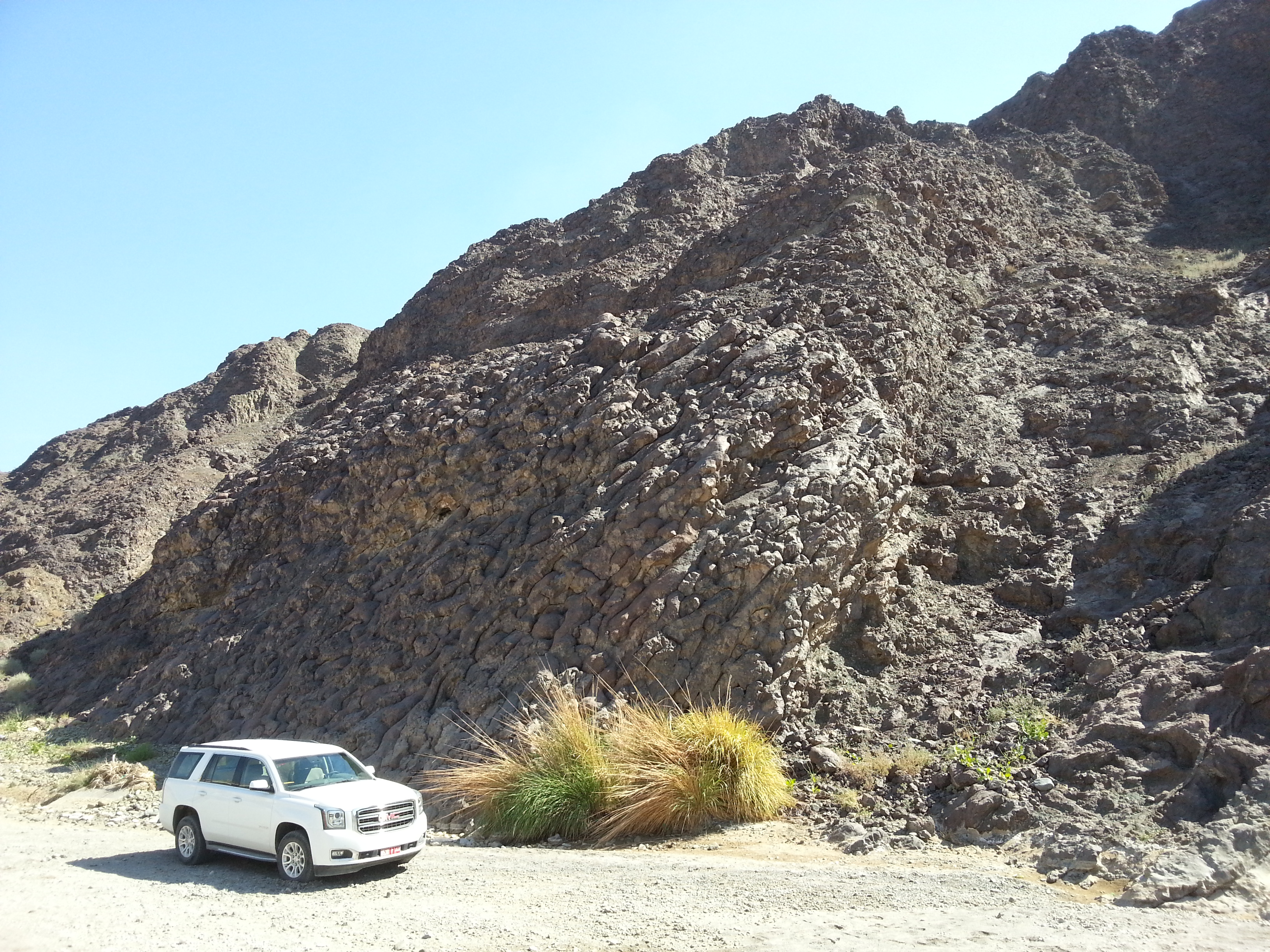
Pillow basalts at Wadi Jizz, which is part of the Semail Ophiolite sequence. These were named the Geotimes Pillow Lavas after a photo of them was published on the cover of the Geotimes magazine in 1975.

Oman's geological record is valuable to geologists. It contains the most complete ophiolite on Earth, of which it is most well known for among geologists. The ophiolite sequence has pillow basalt (Geotimes pillow lava), as well as exposures of the fossil crust-mantle boundary (moho). Generally, ophiolites are obducted prior to continental collision, which highly deforms the structure of the original oceanic crust. However, because continental collision has not occurred in the Hajar, the Semail ophiolite is still intact. Oman also has one of the best exposed mega-sheath folds ever discovered, the Wadi Mayh sheath fold. Additionally, the relatively small outcrop of eclogite is important. Eclogite is rare on the Earths surface, as it is a rock that forms at high pressures deep within the crust or mantle. Geologists can learn about what is occurring in the Earths interior and tectonic processes from these rocks. There are also various fossil localities in Oman. There is concern in the geological community that with the development of infrastructure these rocks that contain a great deal of information will be excavated and destroyed.

== Geography ==
=== Central Hajar ===
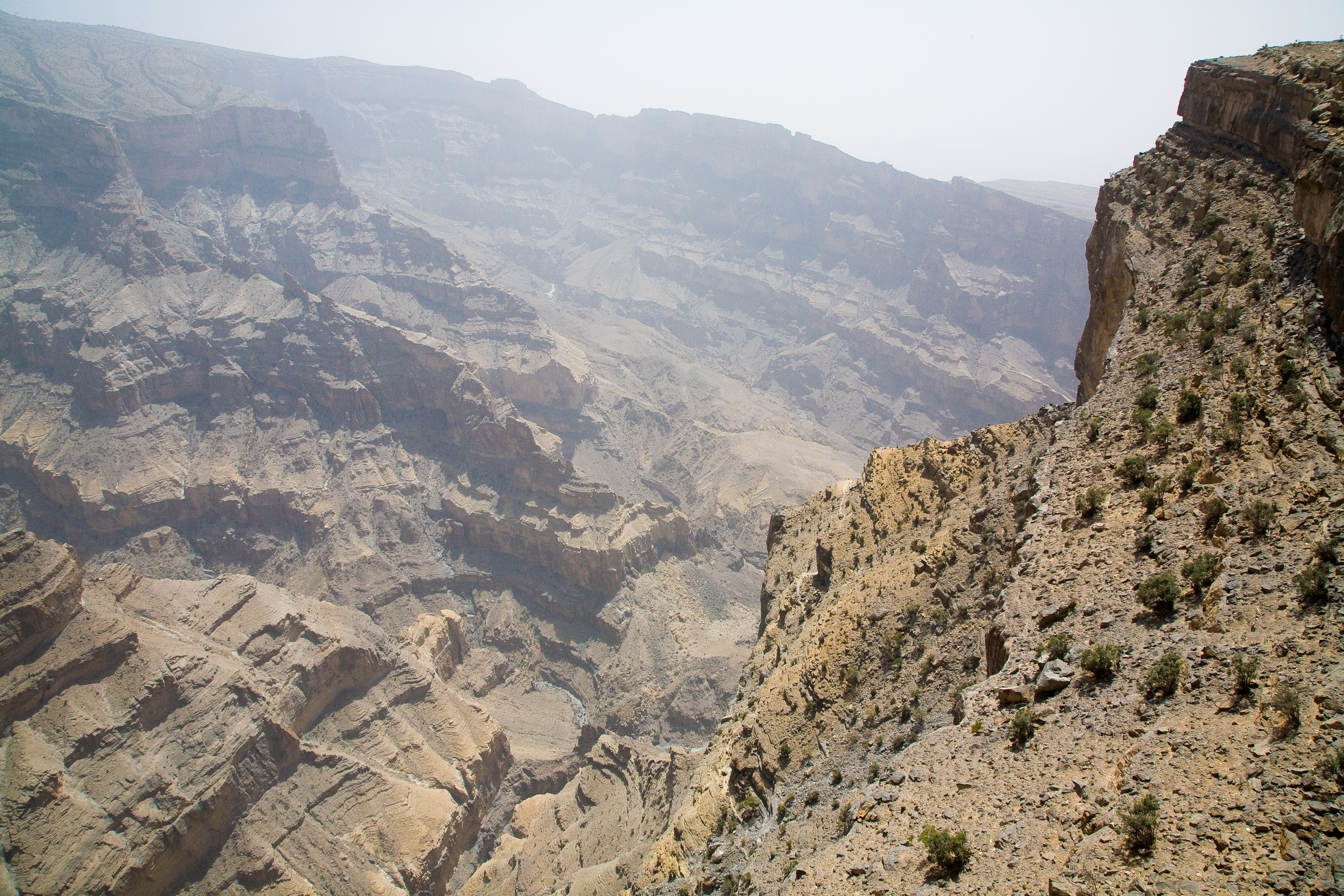
Jabal Shams, which has the highest peak in Oman

The central section of the Hajar is the highest and wildest terrain in the country. Jabal Shams is the highest of the range, followed by Jebel Akhdar. The latter and the smaller Jebel Nakhl range are bounded on the east by the low Samail Valley (which leads northeast to Muscat).

=== Eastern Hajar ===
East of Samail are the Eastern Hajar (Arabic: ٱلْحَجَر ٱلشَّرْقِي, romanized: Al-Ḥajar Ash-Sharqī), which run east (much closer to the coast) to the port city of Sur, almost at the easternmost point of Oman.

=== Western Hajar ===
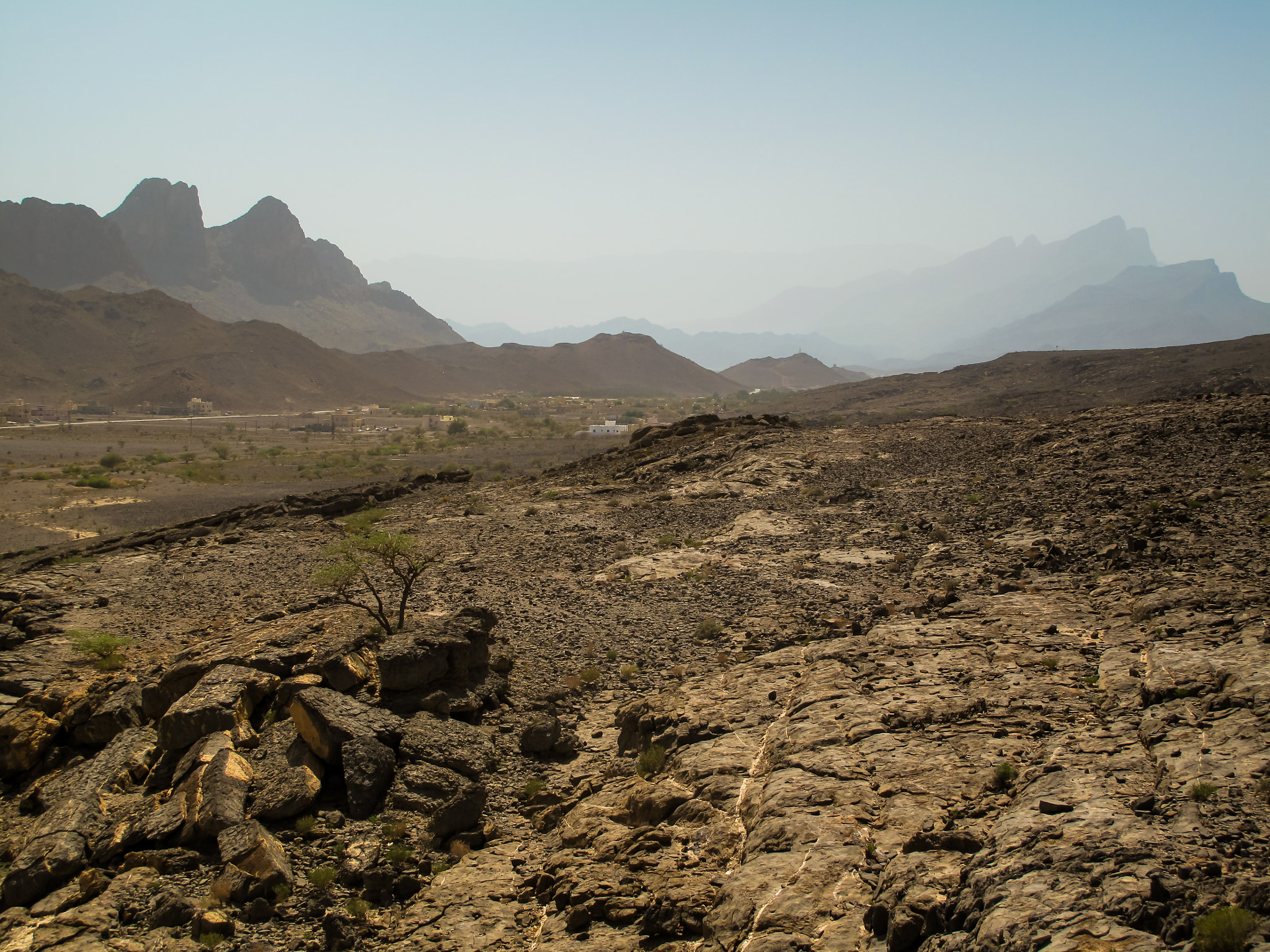
Outside Al-Hoota near Nizwa, Oman

The mountains to the west of Sama'il Valley, particularly those in Musandam Peninsula and the UAE, are known as the Western Hajar (Arabic: ٱلْحَجَر ٱلْغَرْبِي, romanized: Al-Ḥajar Al-Gharbī), also known as the "Oman proper". Since Jabal Akhdar and mountains in its vicinity are west of the valley, they may be regarded as Western Hajar.

==== Outlier(s) ====
In the region of Tawam, which includes the adjacent settlements of Al-Buraimi and Al Ain, on the border of Oman and the UAE Emirate of Abu Dhabi, lies the outlier of Jebel Hafeet, which measures 1,100–1,400 m (3,600–4,600 ft) in height. Due to its proximity to the main range, it may be treated as one of the Hajar Mountains, sensu lato. This mountain has ridges which stretch northwards to the city of Al Ain.

==== Ru'us al-Jibal ====
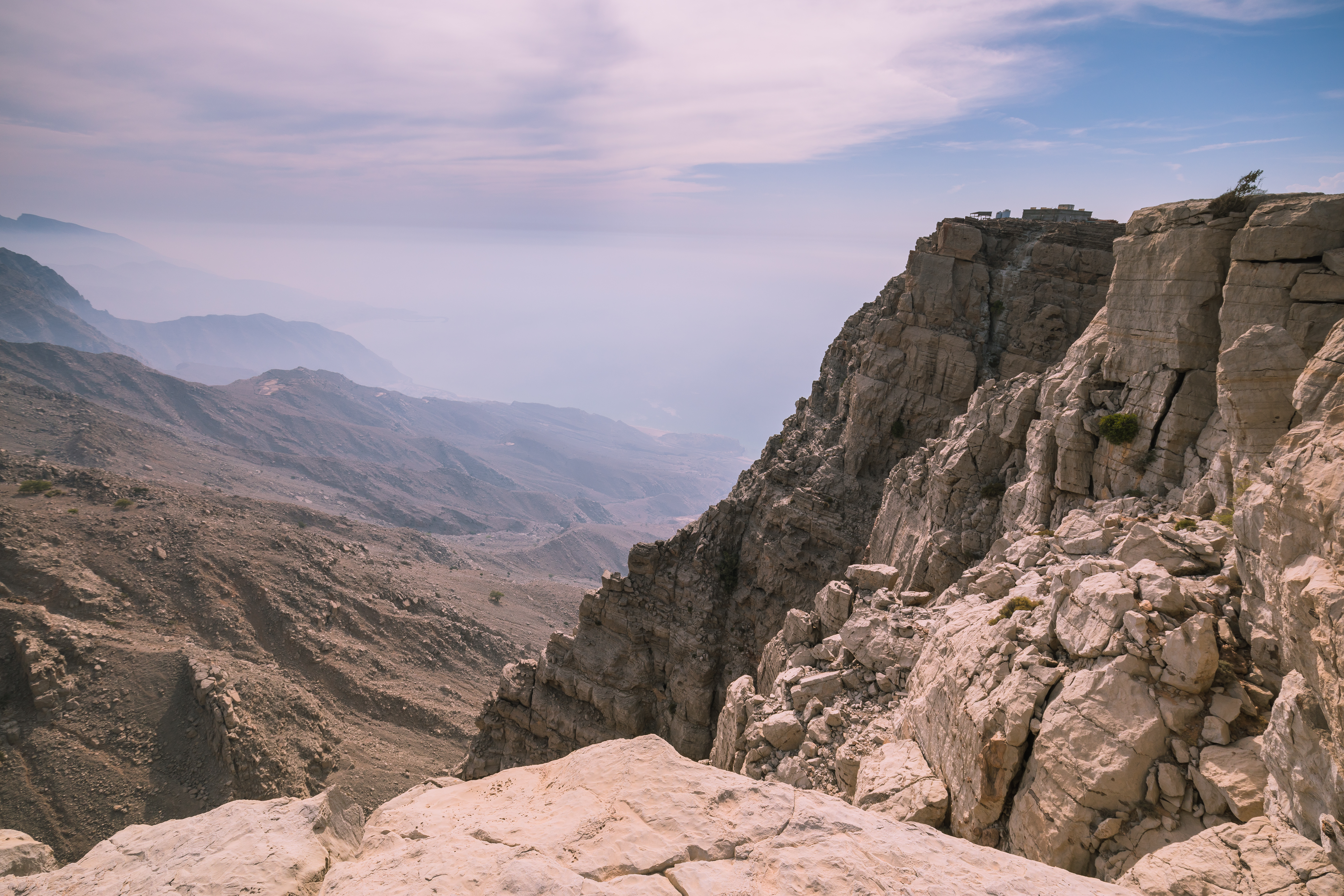
Ru'us al-Jibal in the Musandam Governorate of Oman, north of the UAE city and emirate of Ras Al Khaimah

The northernmost mountains of the Hajar range are found on the Musandam Peninsula. For this reason, the phrase Ru'us al-Jibal ("Heads of the Mountains") is applied to them, or the peninsula itself. Despite being physically part of the western Hajar, they differ in geology and hydrology to the rest of the range. The highest point in the UAE is located at Jebel Jais near Ras Al Khaimah, which measures 1,911 m (6,270 ft) from sea level, but since the summit is on the Omani side, Jabal ar Rahrah, measuring over 1,691 m (1.051 miles), has the highest peak in the UAE.

==== Shumayliyyah ====
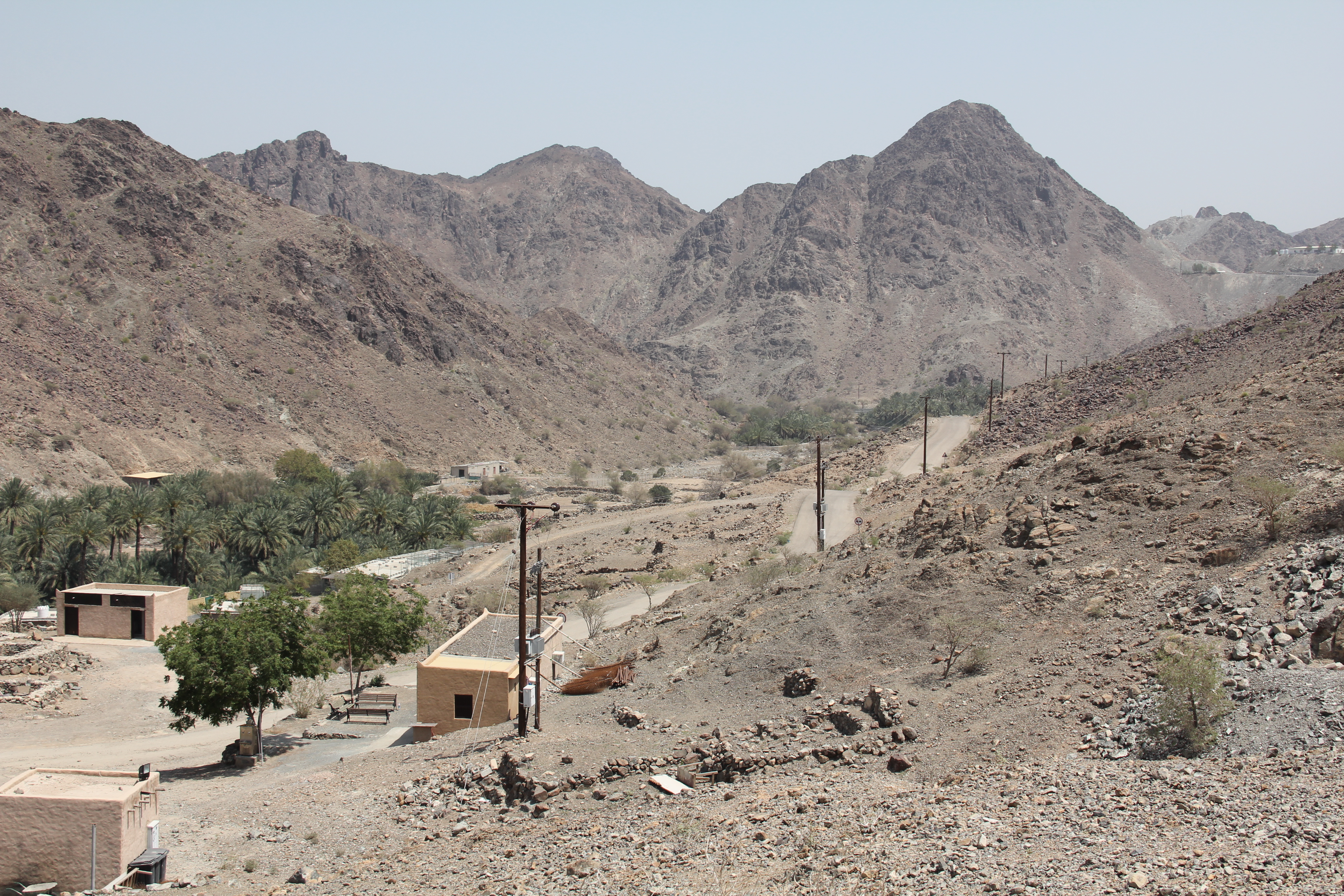
Mountains in the UAE Emirate of Fujairah

The mountains bordering the Shamailiyyah (شَمَيْلِيَّة) coast on the Gulf of Oman, forming parts of the northern UAE Emirates of Sharjah, Ras Al-Khaimah and Fujairah, may also be called the Shumayliyyah (شُمَيْلِيَّة). In this region is Jebel Al-Ḥeben (جَبَل ٱلْحبن; 25°7′33″N 56°9′33″E).

== Flora and fauna ==
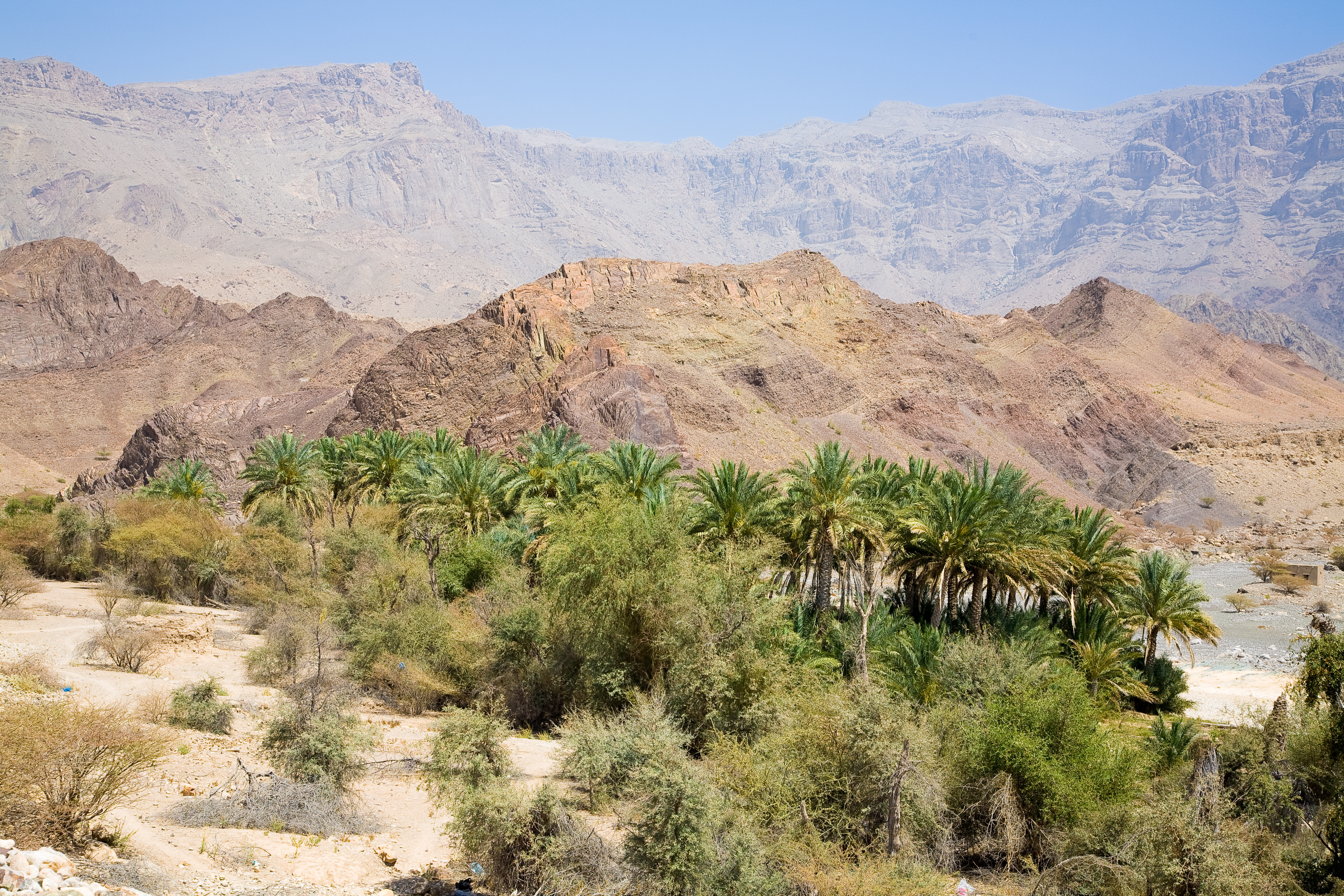
Date palms and other trees amongst the Eastern Hajar, near the east coast of Oman

The mountains are rich in plant life compared to most of Arabia, including a number of endemic species. The vegetation changes with altitude, the mountains are covered with shrubland at lower elevations, growing richer and then becoming woodland, including wild olive and fig trees between 3,630 and 8,250 ft (1,110 and 2,510 metres), and then higher still there are junipers. Fruit trees such as pomegranate and apricot are grown in the cooler valleys and in places there are rocky outcrops with little vegetation. The flora shows similarities with mountain areas of nearby Iran, as well as with areas along the Red Sea in the Horn of Africa. For example, the tree Ceratonia oreothauma is found here and also in Somalia.

A number of birds are found in the mountains including Egyptian and lappet-faced vultures (Torgos tracheliotus). Mammals include mountain gazelles (Gazella gazella) and the Arabian tahr (Arabitragus jayakari). Other endemic species include a number of geckos and lizards: Asaccus montanus, Asaccus platyrhynchus and a subspecies of Wadi Kharrar rock gecko (Pristurus gallagheri) are found only in Oman while Musandam leaf-toed gecko (Asaccus caudivolvulus), Gallagher's leaf-toed gecko (Asaccus gallagheri), Oman rock gecko (Pristurus celerrimus), Jayakar lizard (Omanosaura jayakari) and Oman blue-tailed lizard (Omanosaura cyanura) are found only in the Hajar. The endangered Arabian leopard (Panthera pardus nimr) had been recorded here, particularly in the area of Khasab in northern part of the Musandam.

Like the Ru'us al-Jibal, the area of Jebel Hafeet is noted for hosting rare flora and fauna. For example, in February 2019, an Arabian caracal was sighted here, and in March, a Blanford's fox, which has also been reported in the mountains of Ras Al-Khaimah. In September 2024 it was reported that the rare white-edged rock brown butterflies were spotted in the area.

== Threats and preservation ==
The Hajar are extensively grazed by domestic goats, camels and donkeys and the landscape has been cleared in parts for urban areas and for mining, which has damaged both vegetation and water supplies and uprooted traditional rural land management behaviours. Poaching of wildlife is another issue. The Oman government has created the Wadi Sareen Reserve and an area of Jebel Qahwan-Jebal Sebtah in the Eastern Hajar, for the protection of Arabian tahr and mountain gazelle. For visitors, there is a road into the mountains from the town of Birkat al-Mawz (on the road to Nizwa from Muscat) and a walking route through Wadi al-Muaydin to the Saiq Plateau.

== Trekking and hiking ==
There are 11 marked trails/routes of varying intensity (between Grade 1 to 3) and duration (between 1.5 hours to 18 hours) published by Ministry of Tourism, Oman along the Hajar range. Some areas are inaccessible, and require special equipment, as shown in a Steve Backshall TV documentary.

== See also ==
- Archaeological Sites of Bat, Al-Khutm and Al-Ayn
- Gabal Hagar El Zarqa
- Hafit period
- Hatta Heritage Village
- List of mountains in the United Arab Emirates
- List of mountains in Oman
- List of wadis of the United Arab Emirates
- List of wadis of Oman
- List of tourist attractions in the United Arab Emirates
- Hills of Masirah Island
- Ras al-Jinz

== Bibliography ==
- "Regions of Oman". Statoids.
- Gardner (1994), "A new species of Asaccus (Gekkonidae) from the mountains of northern Oman", Journal of Herpetology, 28 (2): 141–145, doi:10.2307/1564612, JSTOR 1564612
