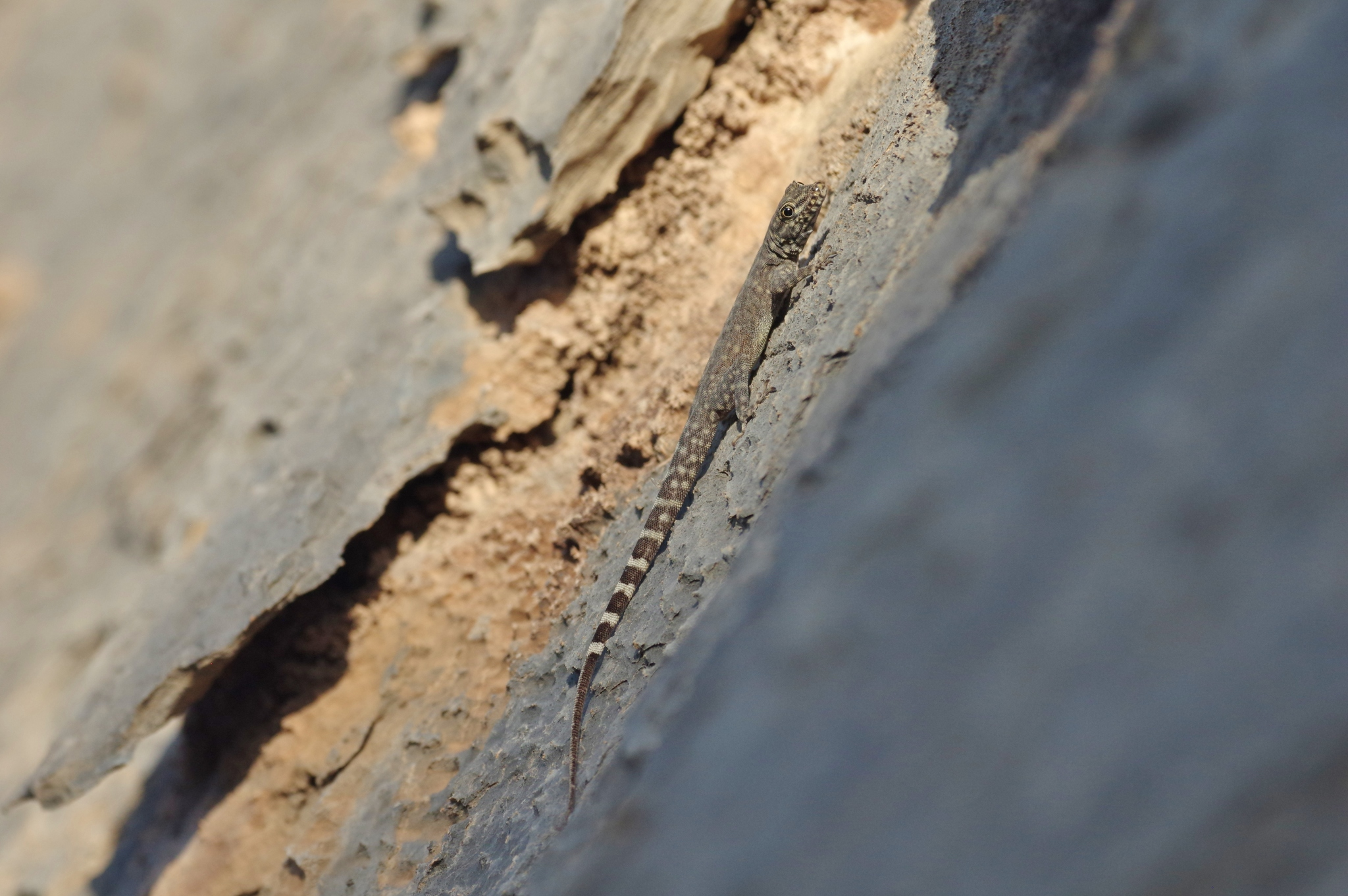

Conservation status
- Least Concern (IUCN 3.1)

Scientific classification
- Kingdom: Animalia
- Phylum: Chordata
- Class: Reptilia
- Order: Squamata
- Suborder: Gekkota
- Family: Sphaerodactylidae
- Genus: Pristurus
- Species: P. celerrimus

Binomial name
- Pristurus celerrimus Arnold, 1977

= Pristurus celerrimus =

Species of lizard

Pristurus celerrimus, also known as the Oman rock gecko or bar-tailed semaphore gecko, is a species of lizard in the Sphaerodactylidae family found in Oman and the United Arab Emirates.

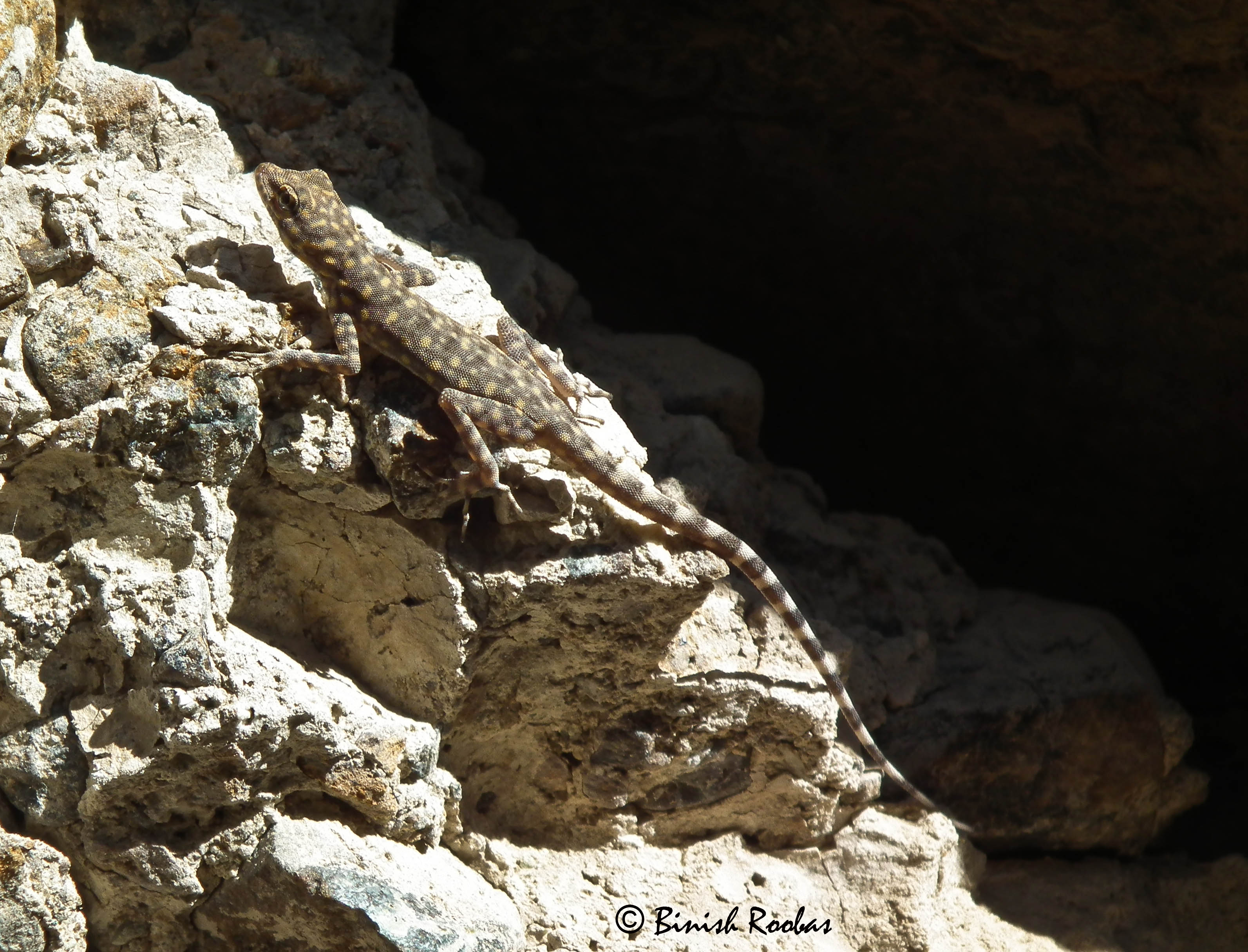
Pristurus celerrimus from Fujairah, United Arab Emirates.
