= Asaccus montanus =

Conservation status
- Vulnerable (IUCN 3.1)

Scientific classification
- Kingdom: Animalia
- Phylum: Chordata
- Class: Reptilia
- Order: Squamata
- Suborder: Gekkota
- Family: Phyllodactylidae
- Genus: Asaccus
- Species: A. montanus

Binomial name
- Asaccus montanus Gardner, 1994

Species of lizard

Asaccus montanus, also known as the mountain leaf-toed gecko, is a species of lizard in the family Phyllodactylidae. It is endemic to Oman.

Asaccus montanus lives at higher elevations on Jebel Akhdar and the Saiq Plateau, which are part of the Hajar Mountains in northern Oman. It has been recorded from 1,850 to 2,250 metres elevation. It has been observed on vertical rock faces, including cliff faces and large boulders in wadis. It has also been found in deep caves.
