= Asaccus kermanshahensis =

Conservation status
- Least Concern (IUCN 3.1)

Scientific classification
- Kingdom: Animalia
- Phylum: Chordata
- Class: Reptilia
- Order: Squamata
- Suborder: Gekkota
- Family: Phyllodactylidae
- Genus: Asaccus
- Species: A. kermanshahensis

Binomial name
- Asaccus kermanshahensis Rastegar-Pouyani, 1996

Species of lizard

The Kermanshah leaf-toed gecko (Asaccus kermanshahensis) is a species of gecko endemic to Iran. It is named for the type locality, north of Kermanshah, eastern Kermanshah Province, in the Zagros Mountains of western Iran. It is found in caves and rock crevices at 1,400 m (4,600 ft).

== Description ==
It is a medium-sized Asaccus gecko with 4 pairs of postmental scales, a small ear opening, and a depressed, pointed head. Most of the dorsal surfaces have numerous large, smooth tubercles, distinguishing it from other similar Asaccus species.
