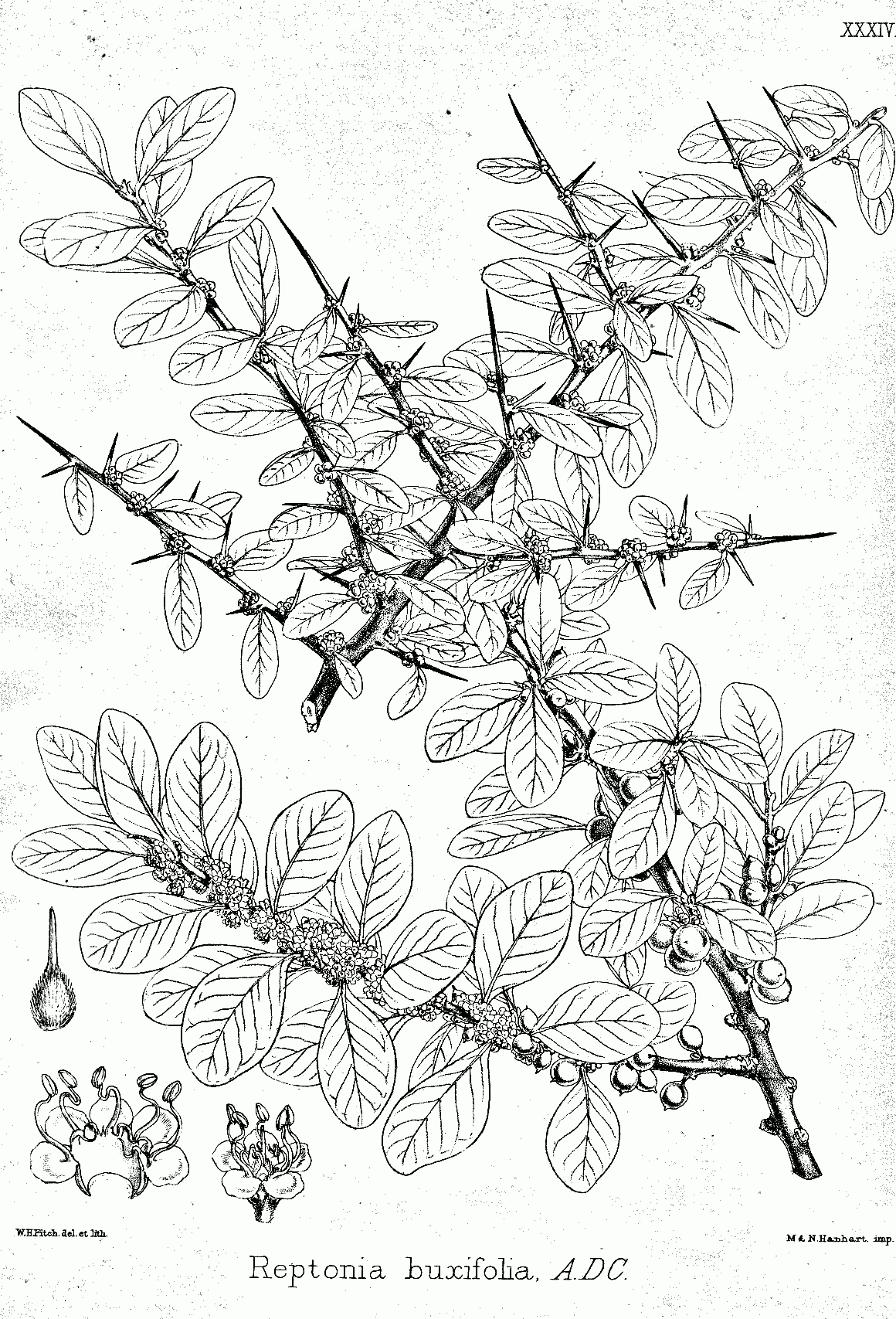

Conservation status
- Least Concern (IUCN 3.1)

Scientific classification
- Kingdom: Plantae
- Clade: Tracheophytes
- Clade: Angiosperms
- Clade: Eudicots
- Clade: Asterids
- Order: Ericales
- Family: Sapotaceae
- Genus: Sideroxylon
- Species: S. mascatense

Binomial name
- Sideroxylon mascatense (A.DC.) T.D.Penn

Synonyms
- Monotheca buxifolia (Falc.) A.DC.; Monotheca mascatensis A.DC.; Reptonia buxifolia A.DC.; Reptonia mascatensis (A.DC.); Sideroxylon aubertii A.Chev.; Sideroxylon buxifolium Hutch.; Sideroxylon corradii Chiov. ex Chiarugi; Sideroxylon gillettii Hutchinson & E.A.Bruce; Spiniluma buxifolia (Hutch.) Aubrév.

= Sideroxylon mascatense =

Species of flowering plant

Sideroxylon mascatense is a species of flowering plant in the family Sapotaceae.

== Description ==
Sideroxylon mascatense is a sclerophyllous spiny shrub or small tree, usually growing 7 to 10 meters tall and occasionally recorded as a medium-sized tree up to 15 meters high.

== Distribution and habitat ==
Sideroxylon mascatense ranges from the Horn of Africa (northeastern Ethiopia, Djibouti, and northern Somalia) through the southern Arabian Peninsula (Yemen, Saudi Arabia, and Oman) to Pakistan and Afghanistan.

On Jebel Akhdar in Oman, S. mascatense is the predominant tree in sclerophyllous semi-evergreen woodlands between 1,350 and 2,350 meters elevation. It is found in association with Dodonaea viscosa, olive (Olea europaea), Ebenus stellatus, Grewia villosa, Juniperus seravschanica, Myrtus communis, and Sageretia spiciflora. S. mascatense was formerly the characteristic tree in the montane semi-evergreen woodlands of the Musandam Peninsula in northernmost Oman and the United Arab Emirates, but livestock grazing and over-harvesting timber and firewood has degraded the peninsula's montane woodlands and Dodonaea viscosa is now the predominant tree there.

== Uses ==
The edible fruit is gathered from the wild for local use. It is sometimes sold in local markets.
