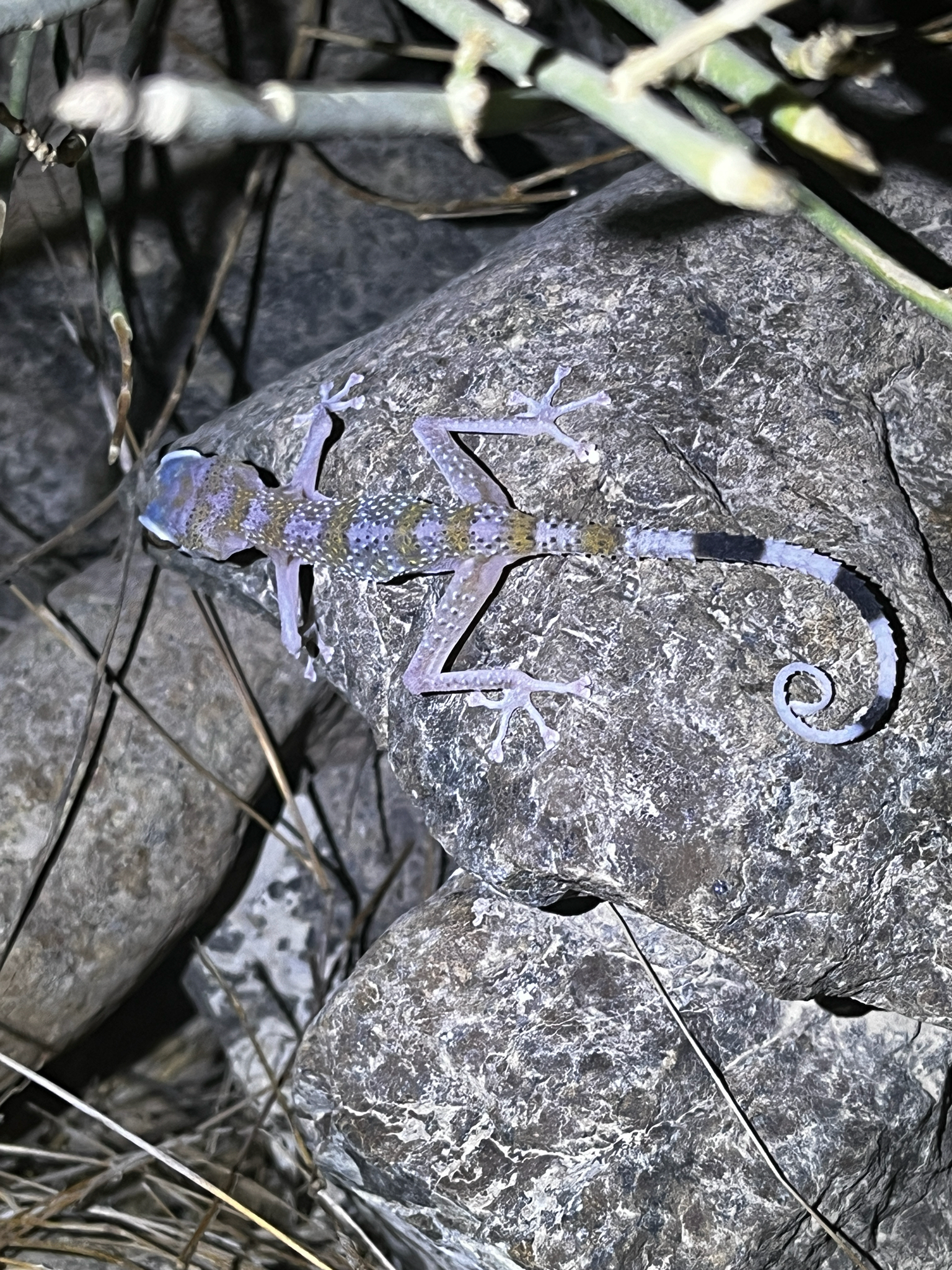

Conservation status
- Critically Endangered (IUCN 3.1)

Scientific classification
- Kingdom: Animalia
- Phylum: Chordata
- Class: Reptilia
- Order: Squamata
- Suborder: Gekkota
- Family: Phyllodactylidae
- Genus: Asaccus
- Species: A. caudivolvulus

Binomial name
- Asaccus caudivolvulus Arnold & Gardner, 1994

= Emirati leaf-toed gecko =

Species of lizard

The Emirati leaf-toed gecko (Asaccus caudivolvulus) is a species of lizard in the family Phyllodactylidae. It is endemic to the United Arab Emirates.
