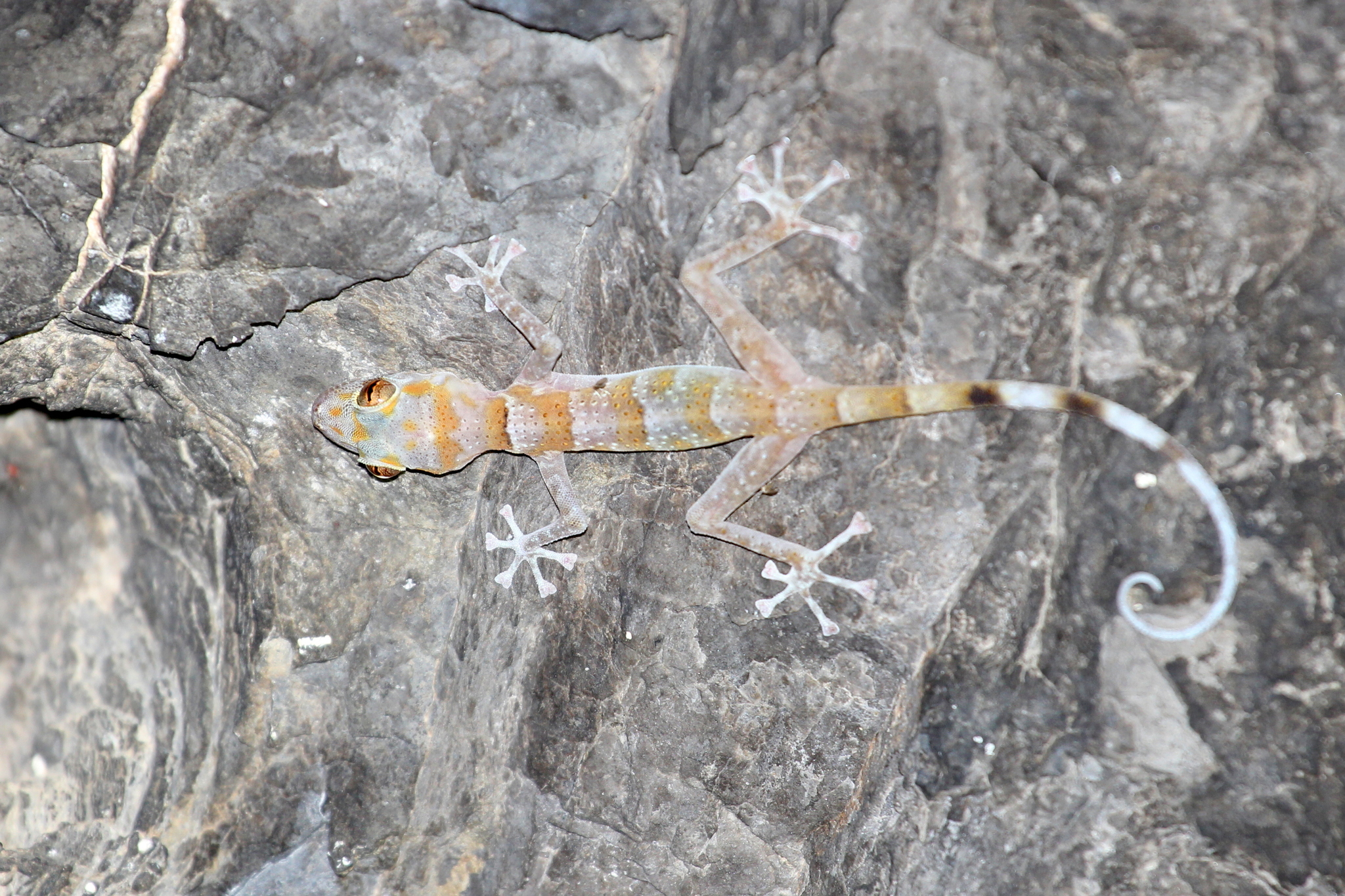

Conservation status
- Least Concern (IUCN 3.1)

Scientific classification
- Kingdom: Animalia
- Phylum: Chordata
- Class: Reptilia
- Order: Squamata
- Suborder: Gekkota
- Family: Phyllodactylidae
- Genus: Asaccus
- Species: A. platyrhynchus

Binomial name
- Asaccus platyrhynchus Arnold & Gardner, 1994

= Asaccus platyrhynchus =

Species of lizard

Asaccus platyrhynchus, the flat-snouted leaf-toed gecko, is a species of lizard in the family Phyllodactylidae. It is endemic to northern Oman, in desert and rocky areas. Asaccus platyrhynchus was first formally described in 1994.
