= Jebel Shams =

Ultra-prominent mountain peak in Oman

Jabal Shams
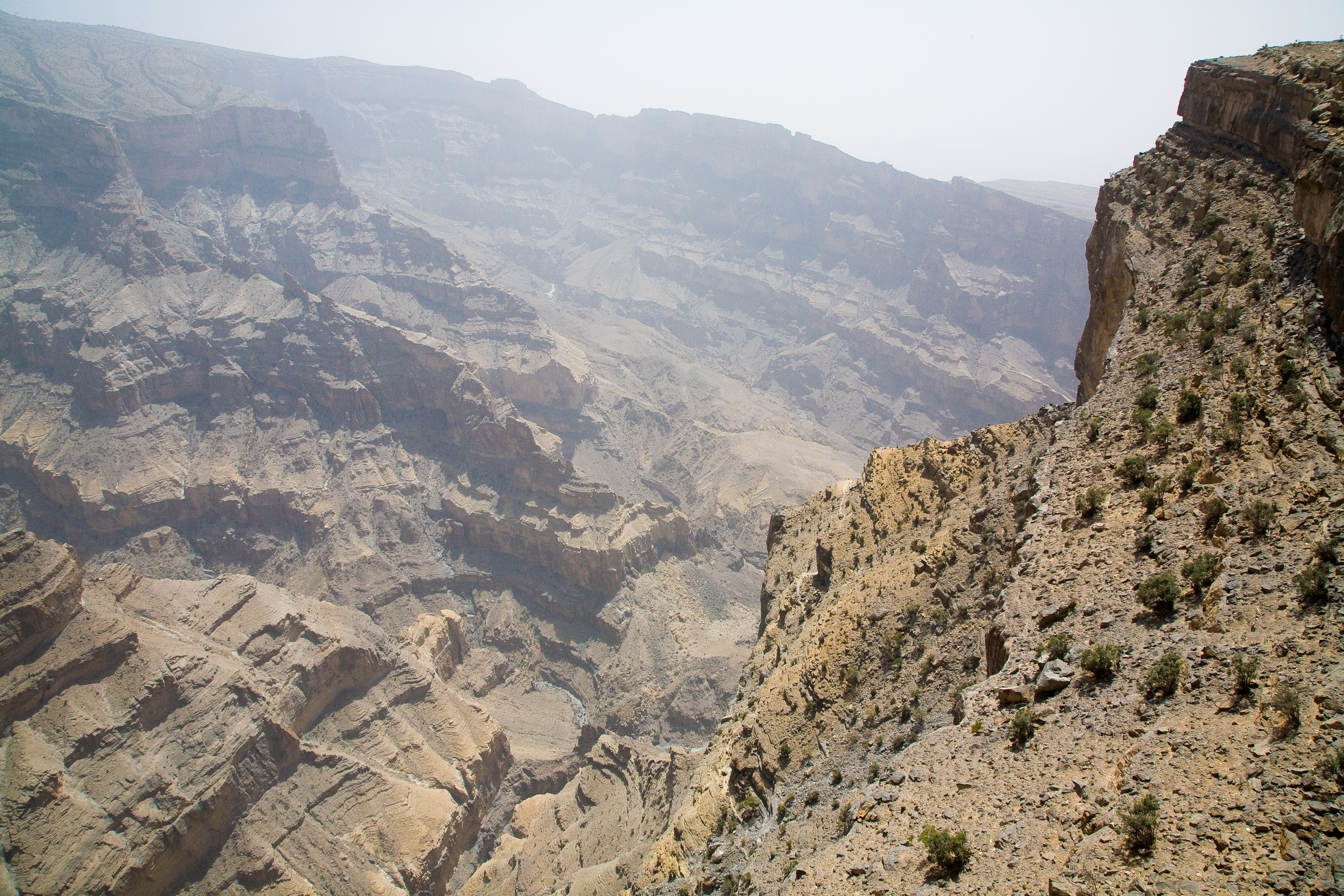

Highest point
- Elevation: 3,018 m (9,902 ft)
- Prominence: 2,818 m (9,245 ft); Ranked 122nd
- Listing: Country high point Ultra
- Coordinates: 23°14′13″N 57°15′50″E

Naming
- Native name: جَبَل شَمْس (Arabic)
- English translation: Mountain of Sun

Geography
- Location within Oman Location within Middle East Location within Asia
- Location: Oman
- Parent range: Al-Hajar Mountains

Climbing
- Easiest route: (to South Summit) W4 route published by Ministry or Tourism, Oman (Grade 2 / 3)

Jabal Shams or Jebel Shams (Arabic: جَبَل شَمْس, lit. 'Mountain of Sun') is a mountain located in northeastern Oman north of the town of Al-Hamra.

It is the highest mountain in Oman, and is part of the Jebel Akhdar or Jabal Akhdar Mountains, which in turn belongs to the Hajar range. The mountain is a popular sightseeing area located 240 km (150 miles) from Muscat.

It is known as Jabal Shams because it is the first place to receive sunrise in Oman due to its high peak.

In the summer, the temperature is around 20 °C (68 °F) and in the winter it drops to less than 0 °C (32 °F). Jabal Shams also hosts Al Nakhur Canyon which is labeled as the Grand Canyon of Arabia.

== Description ==
The highest point of the mountain is the North Summit, which is occupied by a military base and is a restricted area. The Ministry of Tourism, Sultanate of Oman, states the North Summit to be 3,009 m (9,872 ft) high.

The mountain also has a second summit, the South Summit, which is publicly accessible for trekking via the W4 Trail, marked by the Oman Ministry of Tourism. The elevation of the second south summit is 2,997 m (9,833 ft).

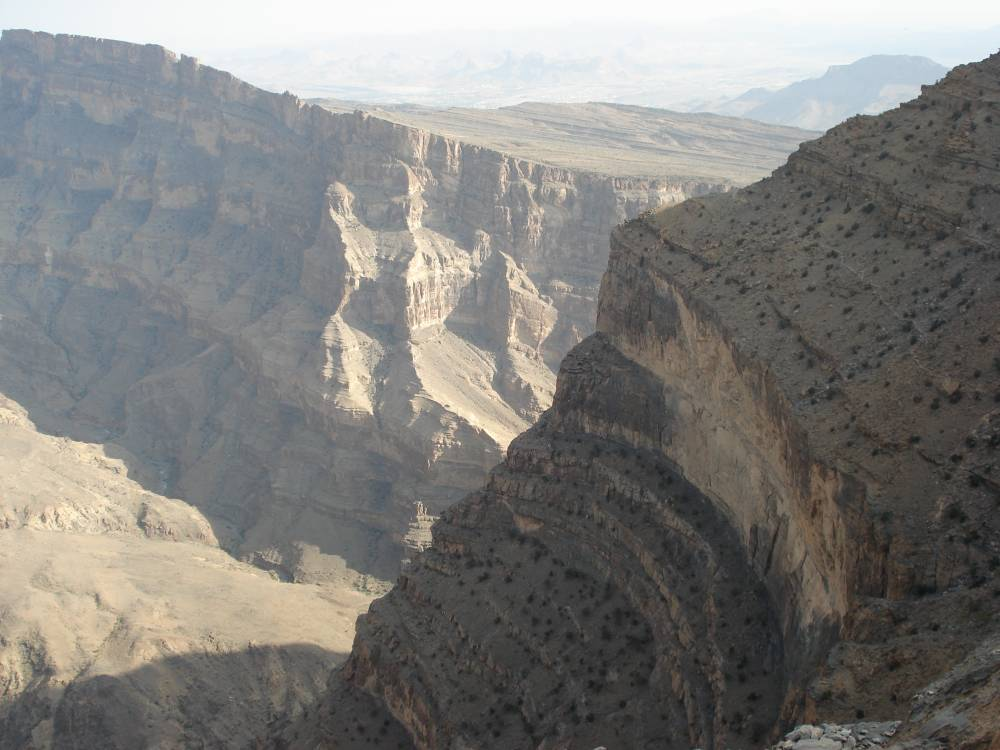
A view from the top

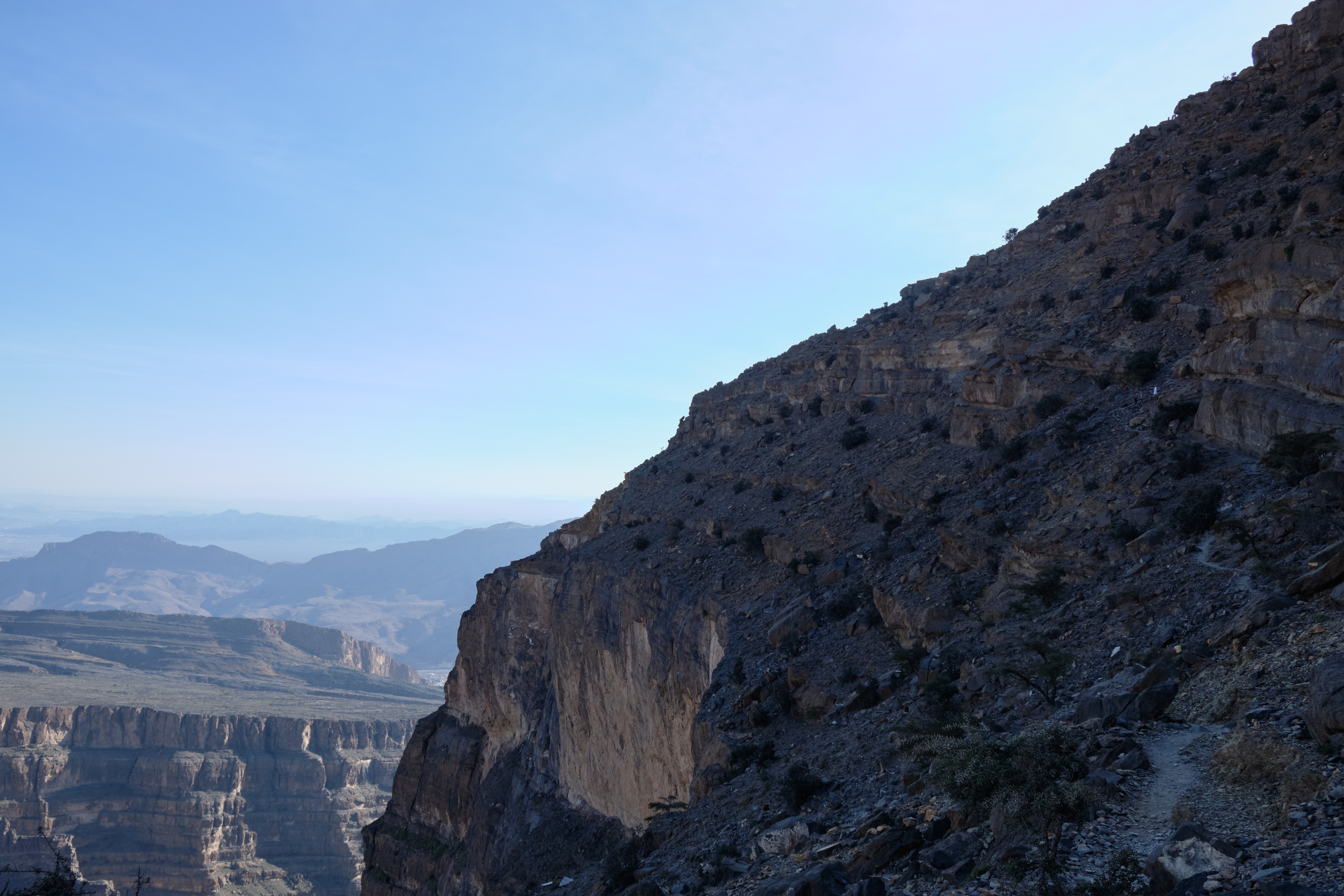
Jebel Shams Balcony Walkway

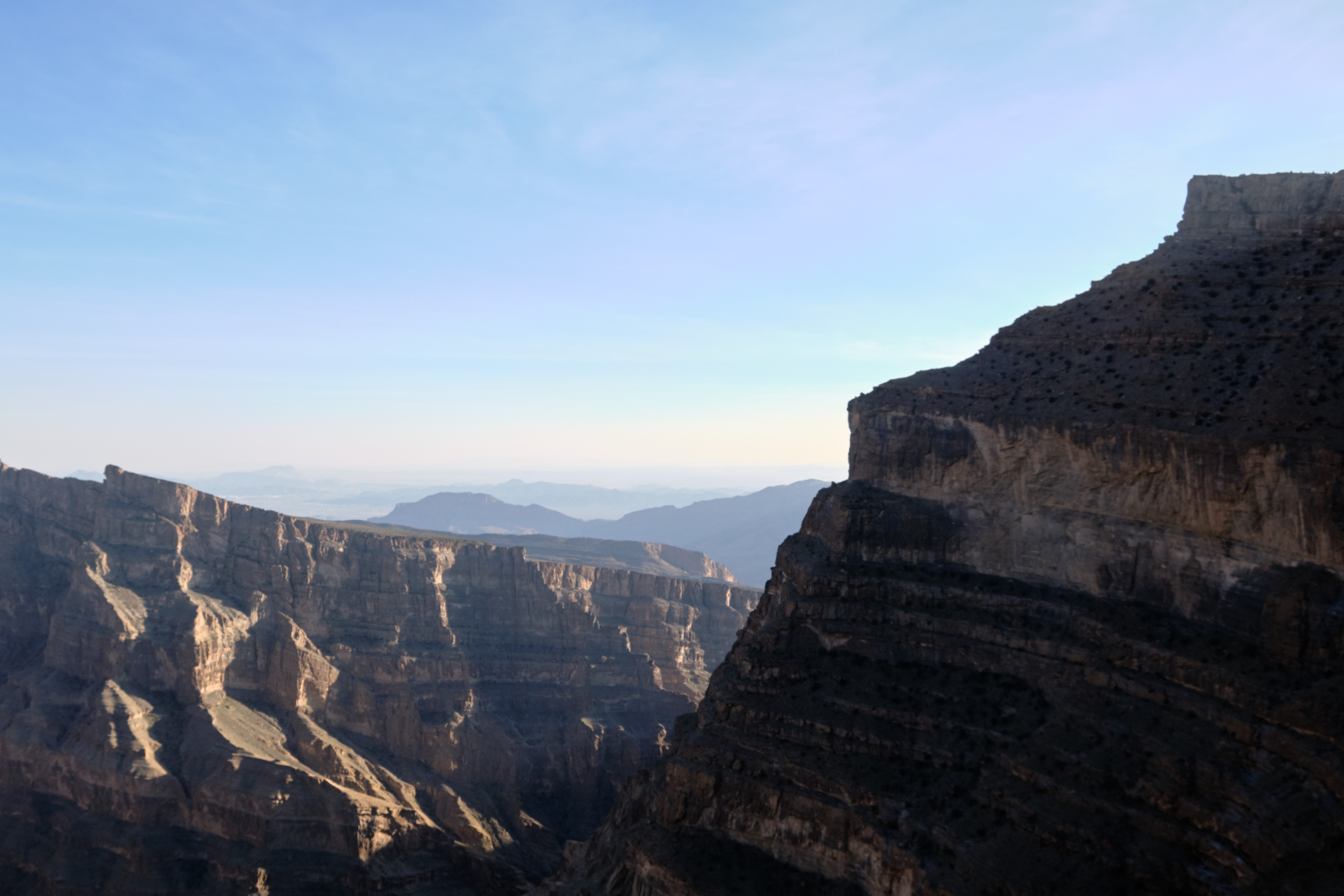
View from the Balcony Walkway

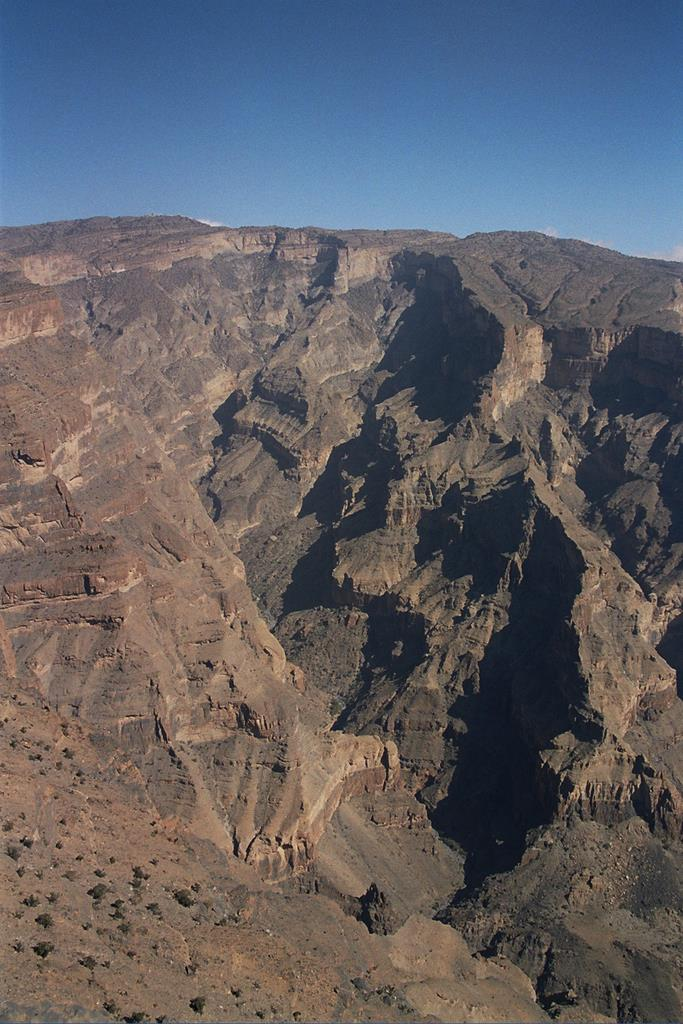
The 'Grand Canyon' of the Middle East

== Climate ==
Climate data for Jebel Shams, elevation 2,764 m (9,068 ft), (2005–2017 normals)
Month	Jan	Feb	Mar	Apr	May	Jun	Jul	Aug	Sep	Oct	Nov	Dec	Year
Mean daily maximum °C (°F)	8.5 (47.3)	9.9 (49.8)	12.9 (55.2)	16.1 (61.0)	19.4 (66.9)	21.9 (71.4)	22.0 (71.6)	20.8 (69.4)	18.9 (66.0)	15.3 (59.5)	11.1 (52.0)	8.7 (47.7)	15.5 (59.8)
Daily mean °C (°F)	5.0 (41.0)	5.9 (42.6)	8.6 (47.5)	11.3 (52.3)	14.7 (58.5)	17.4 (63.3)	18.2 (64.8)	16.7 (62.1)	14.4 (57.9)	10.8 (51.4)	7.3 (45.1)	5.8 (42.4)	11.3 (52.4)
Mean daily minimum °C (°F)	1.9 (35.4)	2.9 (37.2)	5.2 (41.4)	8.1 (46.6)	11.2 (52.2)	14.0 (57.2)	14.7 (58.5)	14.0 (57.2)	11.7 (53.1)	8.0 (46.4)	4.4 (39.9)	2.9 (37.2)	8.3 (46.9)
Average precipitation mm (inches)	2.7 (0.11)	6.4 (0.25)	33.6 (1.32)	19.6 (0.77)	37.5 (1.48)	75.6 (2.98)	43.3 (1.70)	29.0 (1.14)	12.8 (0.50)	16.8 (0.66)	3.5 (0.14)	11.7 (0.46)	292.5 (11.51)
Average precipitation days (≥ 1.0 mm)	0.7	0.5	1.2	2.8	2.8	2.9	4.0	3.9	2.1	1.4	0.6	1.7	24.6
Source: Starlings Roost Weather

== See also ==
- List of mountains in Oman
- List of mountains in the United Arab Emirates
- List of ultras of West Asia
- Middle East
  - Eastern Arabia
