= Asaccus griseonotus =

Conservation status
- Least Concern (IUCN 3.1)

Scientific classification
- Kingdom: Animalia
- Phylum: Chordata
- Class: Reptilia
- Order: Squamata
- Suborder: Gekkota
- Family: Phyllodactylidae
- Genus: Asaccus
- Species: A. griseonotus

Binomial name
- Asaccus griseonotus Dixon & Anderson, 1973

Species of lizard

Asaccus griseonotus, also known as the grey-spotted leaf-toed gecko or grey-marked gecko, is a species of lizard in the family Phyllodactylidae. It is found in Iraq and Iran.
