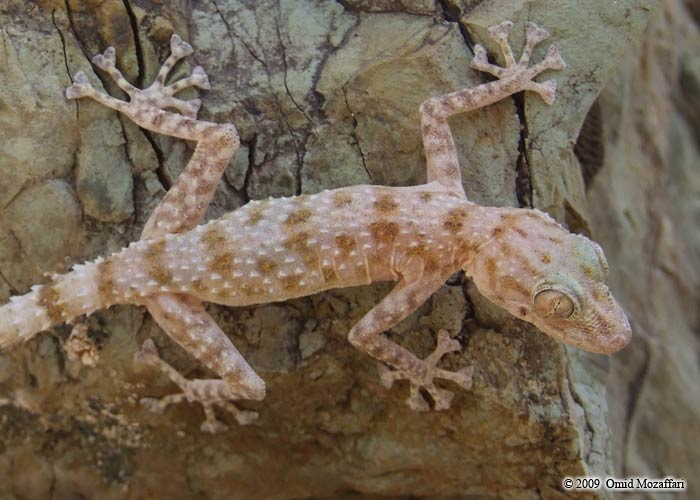

Conservation status
- Least Concern (IUCN 3.1)

Scientific classification
- Kingdom: Animalia
- Phylum: Chordata
- Class: Reptilia
- Order: Squamata
- Suborder: Gekkota
- Family: Phyllodactylidae
- Genus: Asaccus
- Species: A. elisae

Binomial name
- Asaccus elisae (F. Werner, 1895)

Synonyms
- Phyllodactylus elisae F. Werner, 1895; Phyllodactylus eugeniae Nikolsky, 1907; Phyllodactylus elisae — Schmidt, 1939; Phyllodactylus ingae Eiselt, 1973; Asaccus elisae — Dixon & S. Anderson, 1973

= Asaccus elisae =

Species of gecko

Asaccus elisae, also known as Elisa's leaf-toed gecko or Werner's leaf-toed gecko, is a species of gecko, a lizard in the family Phyllodactylidae. The species is native to the Middle East.

== Etymology ==
The specific name, elisae (feminine, genitive singular), is in honor of a woman or girl named Elisa, perhaps Franz Werner's wife or daughter; unfortunately, in the original description, he did not specify.

== Geographic range ==
A. elisae is found in southern Turkey (southeastern Anatolia; in only a few areas on the Euphrates River valley) and southeastward to the eastern part of Syria (known only from Abu Kamal and Al Salhyeh) to eastern and northern parts of Iraq and to western Iran.

== Habitat ==
A. elisae lives at altitudes of 150 to 1,000 m (490 to 3,280 ft) above sea level. It prefers rocky habitats having little vegetation. It has also been recorded in caves, and also in ruins in Iran such as old buildings and houses.

== Description ==
A. elisae may attain a snout-to-vent length (SVL) of 5.7 cm (2.2 in). It has strongly keeled dorsal tubercles. The tail, which is thin, is longer than SVL.

== Reproduction ==
A. elisae is oviparous. Each adult female lays at least two clutches per year. Each clutch contains one or two eggs.
