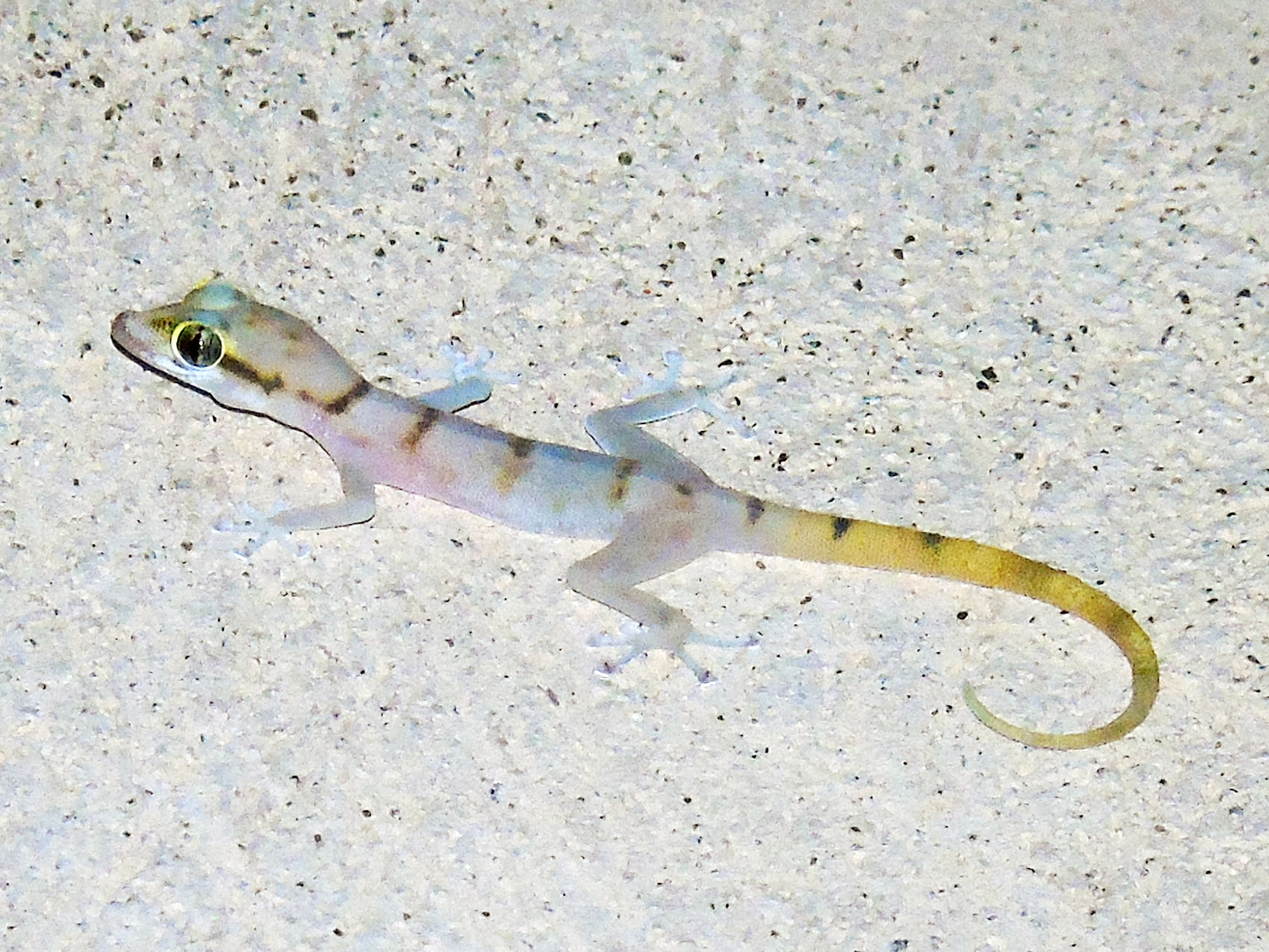

Conservation status
- Least Concern (IUCN 3.1)

Scientific classification
- Kingdom: Animalia
- Phylum: Chordata
- Class: Reptilia
- Order: Squamata
- Suborder: Gekkota
- Family: Phyllodactylidae
- Genus: Asaccus
- Species: A. gallagheri

Binomial name
- Asaccus gallagheri (Arnold, 1972)

Synonyms
- Phyllodactylus gallagheri Arnold, 1972; Asaccus gallagheri — Dixon & S. Anderson, 1973

= Asaccus gallagheri =

Species of lizard

Asaccus gallagheri, also known commonly as Gallagher's gecko or Gallagher's leaf-toed gecko, is a species of lizard in the family Phyllodactylidae. The species is endemic to the Arabian Peninsula and occurs in Oman and the United Arab Emirates.

== Etymology ==
The specific name, gallagheri, is in honor of zoologist Michael Desmond Gallagher (born 1921).

== Habitat ==
The preferred natural habitat of A. gallagheri is rocky areas, at altitudes from sea level to 1,700 m (5,600 ft).

== Reproduction ==
A. gallagheri is oviparous. Clutch size is two eggs.
