= Edwin Nicholas Arnold =

British herpetologist (1940–2023)

Edwin Nicholas Arnold (16 October 1940 – 23 September 2023) was a British herpetologist and the Curator of Herpetology at the Natural History Museum, London. Arnold made seminal contributions to the herpetology of Europe and North Africa, especially on geckos and lizards of the family Lacertidae. He discovered and described 36 species and 4 subspecies of reptiles, and wrote A Field Guide to the Reptiles and Amphibians of Britain and Europe, which appeared over multiple editions. Arnold died of heart failure on 23 September 2023, at the age of 82.

== Honors ==
At least four species of reptiles have been named in Arnold's honor:

- Arnold's leaf-toed gecko Hemidactylus arnoldi Lanza, 1978 is a species of lizard in the family Gekkonidae. The species is endemic to Somalia.
- Asaccus arnoldi Simó-Riudalbas, Tarroso, Papenfuss, Al-Sariri & Carranza, 2017
- Mesalina arnoldi Sindaco, Simó-Riudalbas, Sacchi & Carranza, 2018
- Dipsochelys arnoldi Bour, 1982 (sometimes considered a subspecies of Aldabrachelys gigantea)
- Calotriton arnoldi Carranza & Amat, 2005

== Publications ==
- Arnold EN (1973). "Relationships of the Palearctic lizards assigned to the genera Lacerta, Algyroides and Psammodromus (Reptilia: Lacertidae)". Bulletin of the British Museum (Natural History), Zoology 25: 289-366.
- Arnold EN (2009). "Relationships, evolution and biogeography of Semaphore geckos, Pristurus (Squamata, Sphaerodactylidae) based on morphology". Zootaxa 2060: 1-21.
- Arnold EN, Arribas O, Carranza S (2007). "Systematics of the Palearctic and Oriental lizard tribe Lacertini (Squamata: Lacertidae: Lacertinae), with descriptions of eight new genera". Zootaxa 1430: 1-86.
- Arnold EN, Burton JA (1978). A Field Guide to Reptiles and Amphibians of Britain and Europe. (Illustrated by D. W. Ovenden). London: Collins. 272 pp. + Plates 1-40. ISBN 0-00-219318-3.
