= List of hospitals in Oman =

This is a list of hospitals in Oman. There are 59 hospitals in Oman and 897 medical centres, dispensaries, and clinics. Only 10 hospitals are private, and the rest are government hospitals. Prior to 1958, there were only two hospitals in Oman, the Knox Memorial Hospital and another hospital partially financed by the Sultan of Oman. The Ministry of Health was formed by royal decree of Sultan Qaboos bin Said on August 22, 1970. This decree established standards, policies and funding for expansion of public healthcare facilities in Oman. By 2008, there 58 hospitals, including 49 hospitals managed by the Ministry of Public Health, four private hospitals, three hospitals in the Ministry of Defence, one university hospital, and one hospital for the Royal Oman Police. The Ministry of Health also manages 167 health centers.

== Hospitals in Muscat Governorate ==
The following hospitals are located in the Muscat Governorate. The locations within the Governorate are indicated when known:

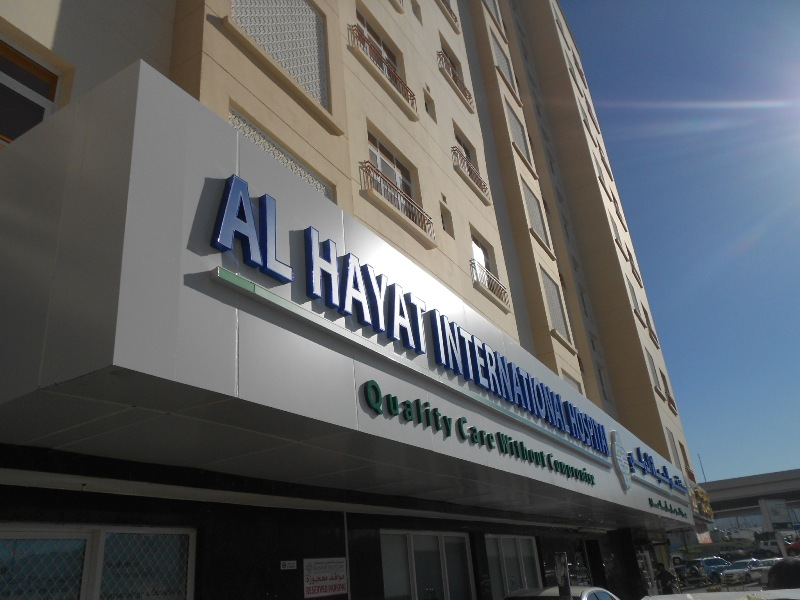
Al Hayat International Hospital

Hospitals in the Muscat Governorate
Name	Location within Muscat	Opened/Refs
Abeer Hospital	Ruwi	
Al Hayat International Hospital (Cardiology, Orthopaedics, Diabetes, Gyneac and other specialities) and Al Hayat polyclinics (Al Ghubra, Sohar and Al Hail)	Al-Ghubra	
Al Khair Hospital	Ibri	
Al Masarra Hospital (Psychiatric Hospital)	Al Hesheia Area at Al-Amerat Willayat	2013
Al Nahdha Hospital	Ruwi	1972
Al Shalti Hospital		
Aster Al Raffah Hospital	Al-Ghubra Roundabout	
Apollo Hospital	Hamriyah	
Armed Forces Hospital	Al-Koudh	
Badr al Samaa Group of hospitals and polyclinics	Ruwi, Al Khoud, and Al Khuwair	(Ruwi) (Al Khoud) (Al Khuwair)
Bilad Bahi Bu Ali Hospital		
Boukha Hospital		
Burjeel Hospital	Al Khuwair	
Deba Hospital		
Fakih IVF Hospital		
Gulf Specialized Hospital	Al Wattaya (Maktabi Building)	
Haima Hospital		
Hamdan Hospital		
Ibn Sina Hospital		1984
Ibri Hospital	Ibri	
Izki Hospital		
Khoula Hospital (National Trauma Center)	Al Wattya	1974
KIMS Oman Hospital	Darsait	
Lifeline Hospital	Salalah	
Lifeline Hospital	Sohar	
Masirah Hospital		
Muscat Private Hospital		
Muscat Private Hospital and IVF Center		
NMC Healthcare Specialty Hospital	Al-Ghoubra	
NMC Healthcare Specialty Hospital	Ruwi	
NMC Healthcare Specialty Hospital	Al Hail	
Oman International Hospital	Ghubrah and Muscat	
Police Hospital		
Quiriyat Hospital	Qurayyat	
The Royal Hospital	Bosher	1987
Starcare Group of Hospitals (Seeb)	Seeb	
Starcare Group of Hospitals (Bousher)	Bousher	
Sultan Qaboos University Hospital	Seeb	1990
Wadi Mistal Hospital	Nakhal	

== Hospitals in the rest of Oman ==
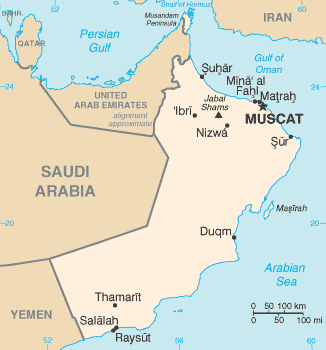
Major cities in Oman

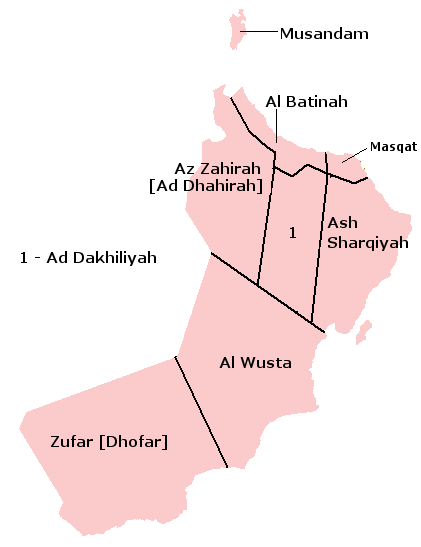
Subdivisions of Oman

The following hospitals and clinics are located outside of the Muscat Governorate:

Hospitals outside of the Muscat Governorate
Name	City	Region/Governorate	First Opened/Refs
Adam Hospital	Adam	Ad Dakhiliyah Governorate	
Al Khair Hospital	Ibri	Ad Dhahirah Governorate	1995
Aster Al Raffah Hospital	Sohar	Al Batinah North Governorate	
Badr al Samaa Group Hospital	Sur	Ash Sharqiyah South Governorate	
Badr al Samaa Group Hospital	Barka	Al Batinah South Governorate	
Badr al Samaa Group Hospital	Sohar	Al Batinah North Governorate	
Badr al Samaa Group Hospital	Salalah	Dhofar Governorate	
Badr al Samaa Group Hospital	Nizwa	Ad Dakhiliyah Governorate	
Badr al Samaa Group Hospital	Falaaj, Suwayq	Al Batinah Region	
Bidiya Hospital	Bidiya	Ash Sharqiyah Reguib	
Buraimi Hospital		Al Buraimi Governorate	1994
Ibra Hospital	Ibra	Ash Sharqiyah Region	2005
Ibri Regional Hospital	Ibri	Ad Dhahirah Governorate	
Khasab Hospital	Khasab	Musandam Governorate	
Lifeline hospital	Sohar	Al Batinah North Governorate	
Nizwa Hospital	Nizwa	Ad Dakhiliyah Governorate (2 Hospitals)	1971
Rustaq Hospital	Rustaq	Al Batinah Region	
Sohar Hospital	Sohar	Al Batinah North Governorate	
Starcare Hospital	Barka	Al Batinah South Governorate	
Sultan Qaboos Hospital Salalah	Salalah	Dhofar Governorate	
Sur Hospital	Sur	Ash Sharqiyah South Governorate	
Al Kashef India Ayurvedic Hospital	Mudaybi	Ash Sharqiyah Governorate	

== Medical Centers and Clinics ==
The following medical centers and clinics (not hospitals) are located in Oman:

- Azura Clinic, Sarooj, MuscatWebsite
- Advanced Medical Center, Qurumhills, Muscat
- Al Hayat Polyclinic, Sohar
- Al Hayat Polyclinic, Al Hail
- Al Hayat Polyclinic, Al Ghubra
- Al Amal Medical Centre, Al-Khuwair
- Al Amal Medical Centre, Al-Lhoud
- Al Amal Medical Centre, Ruwi
- Aster Al Raffah Polyclinic, Amerat, Muscat
- Aster Al Raffah Polyclinic, Al-Khoudh, Muscat
- Aster Al Raffah Polyclinic, Mabela, Muscat
- Aster Al Raffah Polyclinic, Ruwi, Muscat
- Aster Al Raffah Medical Centre, Sohar
- Aster Al Raffah Medical Centre, Liwa
- American Specialty Clinics Center, Medical and dental clinics, Al Qurm St, Muscat
- Advanced Fertility & Genetics Center LLC, Al-Khuwair
- Al Bushra Medical Specialty Complex, Al-Azaiba
- Al Burooj Medical Center, Barkha, Oman
- Al Hakeem Fertility Mother and Child Care Centre, Al-Khuwair
- Happy Kid Clinic, Qurum, suburb of Muscat
- Hatat Polyclinic (Hatat Complex, Wadi Adai and Azaibha)
- International Urology and Specialized Surgery Center
- Prime Medical Centre, Mabellah North, Muscat
- Lama Polyclinic, Ruwi and Al-Khuwair
- Magreb Eye and Ear Clinic
- Medical Vision Specialty Center, Qurum
- New Hope Medical Center, Qurum (Jordanian expertise)
- Noor al Shifa Medical Complex, Thumarit
- Sagar Polyclinic, Al-Khuwair, Muscat
- Starcare Group of Hospitals, Sharja
- Top Medical Care, Seeb, Muscat
- Liya Medical Complex, Salalah, Dhofar

== See also ==
- Health in Oman
- Healthcare in Oman
