= 2015 Tour of Oman =

2015 UCI Asia Tour, race 6

Race details
- Dates: 17–22 February 2015
- Stages: 6
- Distance: 837 km (520 mi)
- Winning time: 21h 09' 31"

Results
Jersey awarded to the overall winner	Winner	Rafael Valls (ESP)	(Lampre–Merida)
	Second	Tejay van Garderen (USA)	(BMC Racing Team)
	Third	Alejandro Valverde (ESP)	(Movistar Team)
Jersey awarded to the points classification winner	Points	Andrea Guardini (ITA)	(Astana)
Jersey awarded to the young rider classification winner	Young rider	Louis Meintjes (RSA)	(MTN–Qhubeka)
Jersey awarded to the combativity classification winner	Combativity	Jef Van Meirhaeghe (BEL)	(Topsport Vlaanderen–Baloise)
	Team	BMC Racing Team	

The 2015 Tour of Oman was the sixth edition of the Tour of Oman cycling stage race. It was rated as a 2.HC event on the 2015 UCI Asia Tour, and was held from 17 to 22 February 2015, in Oman. The race was organised by the municipality of Muscat, in collaboration with ASO (the organisers of the Tour de France) and Paumer. Chris Froome, the defending champion from 2013 and 2014, was not present to defend his title.

The decisive stage in this as in past editions was the climb of Jebel Akhdar. That stage was won by Rafael Valls of Lampre–Merida, who went on to defend his overall race lead to the finish in Muscat. This was aided by the controversial events of stage 5, which was eventually abandoned due to extreme weather conditions. Tejay van Garderen (BMC Racing Team) finished second (as he had in 2014) and Alejandro Valverde (Movistar Team) finished third.

The points competition was won by Andrea Guardini (Astana), who won the first stage of the race. Louis Meintjes (MTN–Qhubeka) was the best young rider, while Jef Van Meirhaeghe (Topsport Vlaanderen–Baloise) won the combativity prize after participating in the breakaway on every stage of the race. BMC Racing Team was the winner of the teams classification.

== Teams ==
18 teams were selected to take part in the event, including 12 UCI WorldTeams.

- Astana
- Bardiani–CSF
- BMC Racing Team
- Bora–Argon 18
- Cofidis
- Etixx–Quick-Step
- FDJ
- IAM Cycling
- Lampre–Merida
- Movistar Team
- MTN–Qhubeka
- Orica–GreenEDGE
- Team Giant–Alpecin
- Team Katusha
- Team Sky
- Tinkoff–Saxo
- Topsport Vlaanderen–Baloise
- Trek Factory Racing

== Pre-race favourites ==
The Tour of Oman was the third of a trio of stage races in the Middle East that come early in the road cycling season, following the Dubai Tour and the Tour of Qatar, in 2015 won by Mark Cavendish and Niki Terpstra respectively. The distinctive feature of the Tour of Oman was the annual inclusion of the climb of Jebel Akhdar, the Green Mountain, which meant the general classification was generally won by climbing specialists. Many Grand Tour contenders started their seasons racing in Oman for this reason.

In 2013 and 2014, the race was won by Chris Froome (Team Sky) as the beginning of his preparation for the Tour de France. In 2015, however, Froome opted to begin his season at the Vuelta a Andalucía and so missed the Tour of Oman. The race was therefore expected to be contested between other Grand Tour riders, such as Tour de France champion Vincenzo Nibali (Astana), Tejay van Garderen (BMC Racing Team), Thibaut Pinot (FDJ), Rafał Majka (Tinkoff–Saxo), Joaquim Rodríguez (Team Katusha), Rigoberto Urán (Etixx–Quick-Step) and Leopold König (Team Sky).

Although the general classification was expected to be contested by climbers, many riders rode the Tour of Oman with other aims. Spring classics riders used the race as a last block of racing before the European classics season started with Omloop Het Nieuwsblad, while sprinters aimed to win stages. Notable sprinters at the 2015 race included Alexander Kristoff (Team Katusha), who won three stages in the 2014 Tour of Qatar, Nacer Bouhanni (Cofidis) and Peter Sagan (Tinkoff–Saxo). Stages 1, 3 and 6 were predicted to be suited for the pure sprinters, while stages 2 and 5 were expected to suit riders who could cope with some climbing.

== Route ==
The 2015 event was scheduled to have six stages, including four flat stages, one medium-mountain stage and one mountain stage.

Stage characteristics and winners
Stage	Date	Course	Type	Distance	Winner
1	17 February	Bayt Al Naman Castle to Wutayyah	Flat stage	161 km (100.0 mi)	Andrea Guardini (ITA)
2	18 February	Al Hazm Castle to Al Bustan	Flat stage	195 km (121.2 mi)	Fabian Cancellara (SUI)
3	19 February	Al-Musannah Sports City to Al-Musannah Sports City	Flat stage	158.5 km (98.5 mi)	Alexander Kristoff (NOR)
4	20 February	Sultan Qaboos Grand Mosque to Jebel Akhdar	Mountain stage	189 km (117.4 mi)	Rafael Valls (ESP)
5	21 February	Al Sawadi Beach to Ministry of Housing	Intermediate stage	151.5 km (94.1 mi)	No winner
6	22 February	Oman Air to Muttrah Promenade	Flat stage	133.5 km (83.0 mi)	Matthias Brändle (AUT)

== Stages ==
=== Stage 1 ===
17 February 2015 — Bayt Al Naman Castle to Wutayyah, 161 km (100.0 mi)

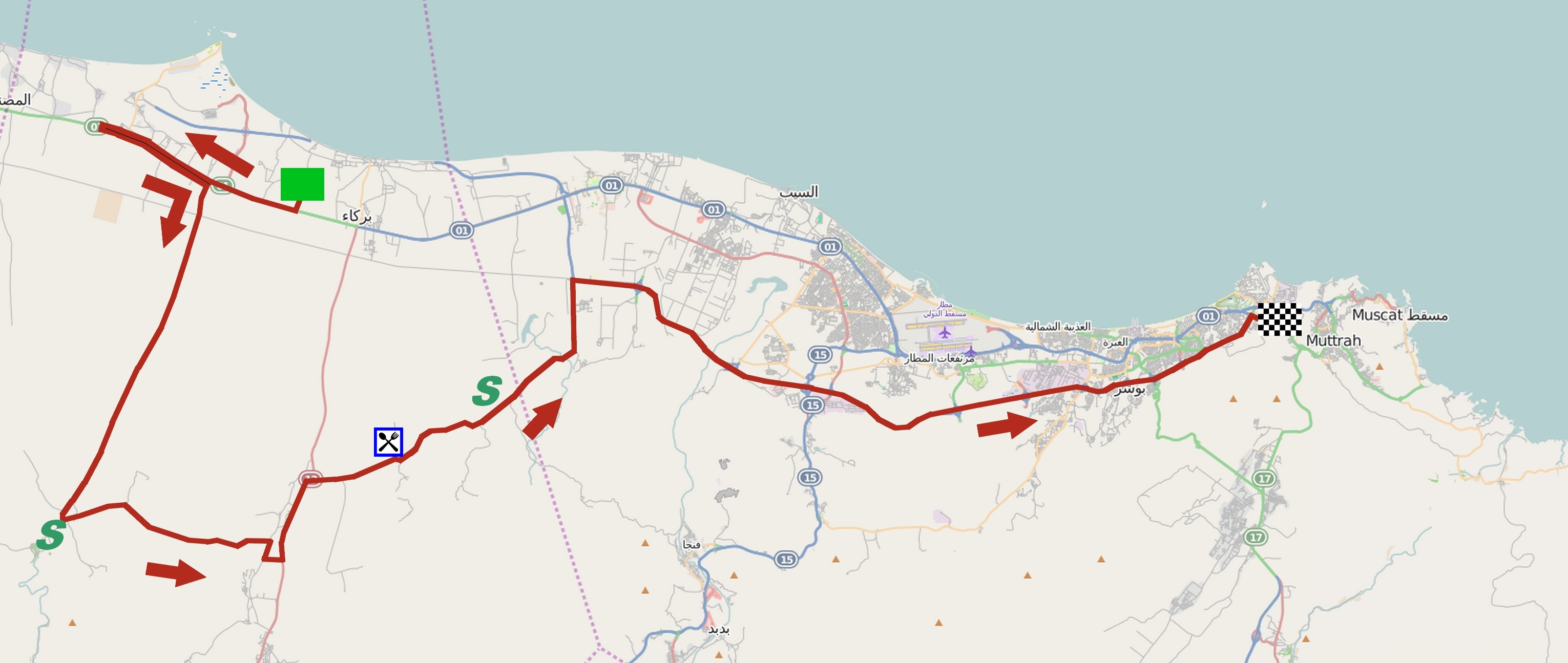
Stage 1 route

The first stage was a 161-kilometre (100-mile) route from Bayt al Naman Castle to Wutayyah on the outskirts of Muscat. It was a fairly flat course, with an uphill finish. Temperatures exceeded 30 °C (86 °F).

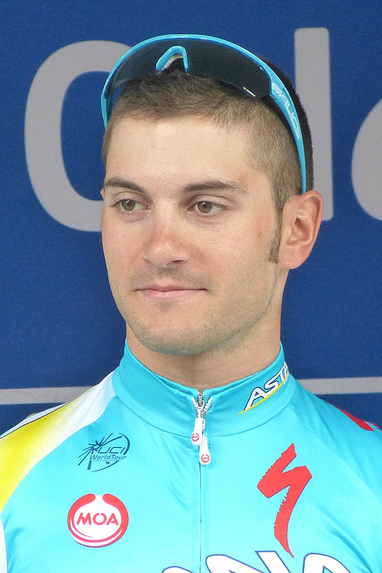
Andrea Guardini, photographed in 2013, the winner of stage 1 and the points classification

The early breakaway was formed by Johann van Zyl (MTN–Qhubeka), Patrick Konrad (Bora–Argon 18), Simone Andreetta (Bardiani–CSF) and Jef Van Meirhaeghe (Topsport Vlaanderen–Baloise), who built a lead of up to five minutes. The chasing peloton was led for most of the day by Team Katusha, in support of their leader Alexander Kristoff, for whom the uphill finish was ideal. Movistar Team and Trek Factory Racing aided in the chase.

Van Zyl put in an attack with 85 kilometres (53 miles) remaining, leaving his breakaway companions behind. This group was soon caught by the peloton after Konrad suffered a puncture; van Zyl was caught with 32 kilometres (20 miles) remaining. Team Katusha continued to lead the peloton until the final kilometres. At this point, Etixx–Quick-Step led out the sprint in support of Tom Boonen. However, they misjudged the difficulty towards the finish line: there was a 2–3% incline and a headwind. This caused the team to mistime the sprint: Boonen's lead-out man Matteo Trentin was only able to support him until there were 200 metres (660 feet) remaining. Andrea Guardini (Astana) was supported by his teammate Borut Božič and was then able to follow Boonen and come past him in the final 50 metres (160 feet) to take his first victory of 2015. Matteo Pelucchi (Lampre–Merida) took third place.

Guardini therefore took the red jersey of overall leader. Van Zyl, Konrad and Andreetta all finished on the same time as Guardini and so moved into the top ten thanks to bonus seconds won at intermediate sprints.

Stage 1 result
Rank	Rider	Team	Time
1	Andrea Guardini (ITA)	Astana	3h 45' 38"
2	Tom Boonen (BEL)	Etixx–Quick-Step	+ 0"
3	Matteo Pelucchi (ITA)	IAM Cycling	+ 0"
4	Ramon Sinkeldam (NED)	Team Giant–Alpecin	+ 0"
5	Alexander Kristoff (NOR)	Team Katusha	+ 0"
6	Nacer Bouhanni (FRA)	Cofidis	+ 0"
7	Peter Sagan (SVK)	Tinkoff–Saxo	+ 0"
8	Sam Bennett (IRL)	Bora–Argon 18	+ 0"
9	Sacha Modolo (ITA)	Lampre–Merida	+ 0"
10	Arnaud Démare (FRA)	FDJ	+ 0"

General classification after stage 1
Rank	Rider	Team	Time
1	Andrea Guardini (ITA)	Astana	3h 45' 28"
2	Tom Boonen (BEL)	Etixx–Quick-Step	+ 4"
3	Patrick Konrad (AUT)	Bora–Argon 18	+ 5"
4	Matteo Pelucchi (ITA)	IAM Cycling	+ 6"
5	Johann van Zyl (RSA)	MTN–Qhubeka	+ 7"
6	Simone Andreetta (ITA)	Bardiani–CSF	+ 9"
7	Ramon Sinkeldam (NED)	Team Giant–Alpecin	+ 10"
8	Alexander Kristoff (NOR)	Team Katusha	+ 10"
9	Nacer Bouhanni (FRA)	Cofidis	+ 10"
10	Peter Sagan (SVK)	Tinkoff–Saxo	+ 10"

=== Stage 2 ===
18 February 2015 — Al Hazm Castle to Al-Bustan, 195 km (121.2 mi)

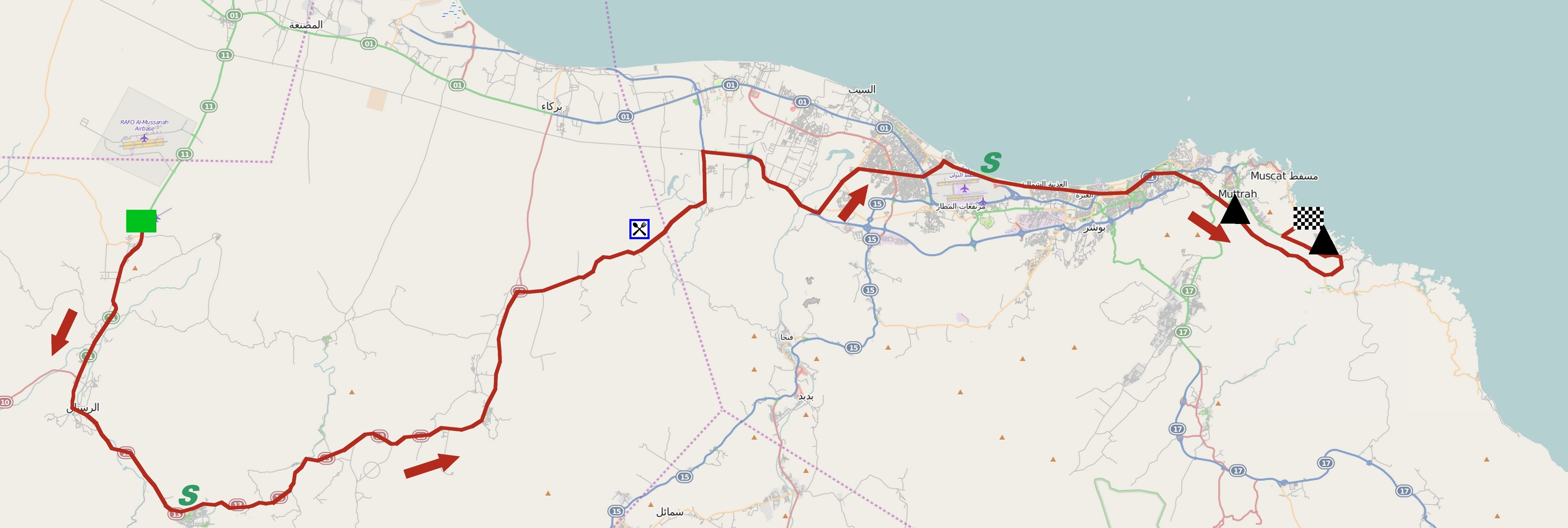
Stage 2 route

Stage 2 was the longest of the race, covering a 195-kilometre (121-mile) route from Al Hazm Castle to Al-Bustan. It was classified as a flat stage, but there were two notable climbs within the last 25 kilometres (16 miles), presenting the opportunity for riders to attack close to the finish.

The early breakaway was formed by Gatis Smukulis (Team Katusha), Preben Van Hecke, Jef Van Meirhaeghe (both Topsport Vlaanderen–Baloise), and Enrico Barbin (Bardiani–CSF). The chase was led by Astana, defending the red jersey of Andrea Guardini. After about 50 kilometres (31 miles), Barbin suffered a puncture; he was dropped by the remaining three riders and was then caught by the peloton. As the stage progressed, Tinkoff–Saxo took control of the peloton in support of Peter Sagan. Their strong pace meant that the main group was soon catching the breakaway, but the peloton itself began to split, with riders including Edvald Boasson Hagen (MTN–Qhubeka) and Arnaud Démare (FDJ) among the riders temporarily distanced from the front of the race.

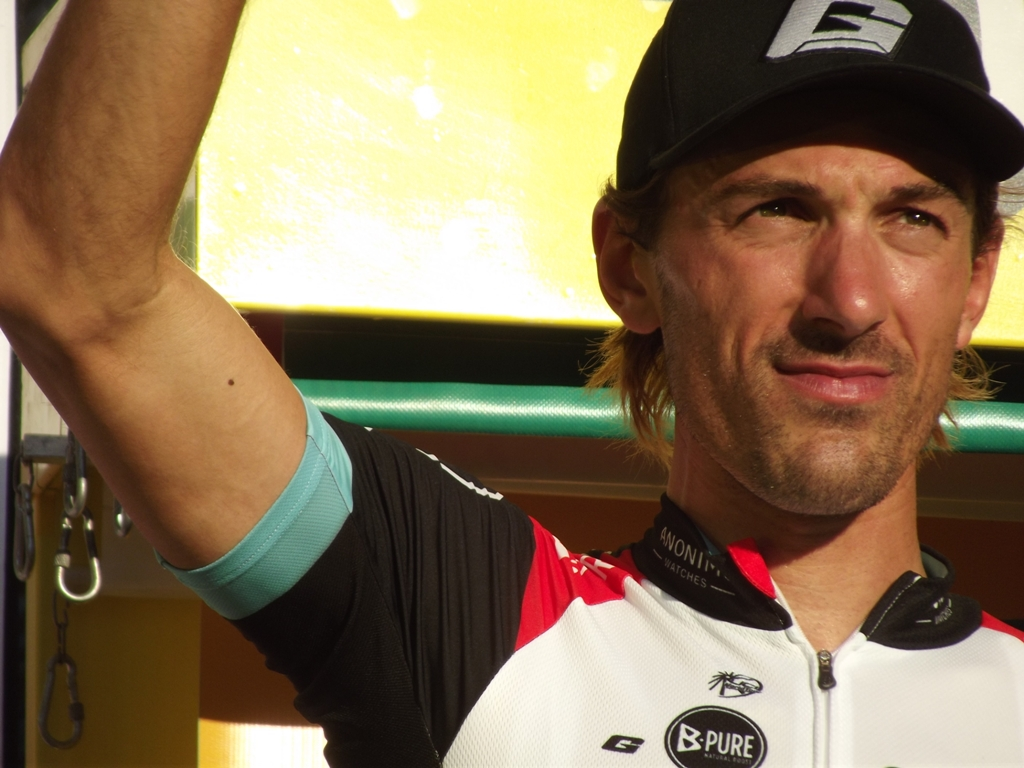
Fabian Cancellara, photographed in 2013, winner of stage 2

The breakaway had a two-minute lead with 25 kilometres (16 miles) remaining, as they approached the climbs at the end of the stage. Smukulis attacked on the first climb, Al Hamriyah, and had a 30-second lead at the summit, with the peloton a little over a minute behind. Guardini was among the riders who were dropped from the peloton, with Joaquim Rodríguez (Team Katusha) and Thibaut Pinot (FDJ) also in difficulty. Smukulis was caught soon afterwards, with 16.5 kilometres (10 miles) remaining, under continued impetus from Tinkoff–Saxo.

On the second climb, Al Jissah, there was an attack from Jakob Fuglsang (Astana), Ben Hermans (BMC Racing Team), Julián Arredondo (Trek Factory Racing), and Louis Meintjes (MTN–Qhubeka). Pinot, Rodríguez and Vincenzo Nibali (Astana) were all dropped by the peloton, now reduced to a small group. This group, made up of 14 riders, was able to catch the breakaway soon after the climb. Tejay van Garderen (BMC Racing Team), Rafał Majka (Tinkoff–Saxo) and Alejandro Valverde (Movistar Team) all made attacks in the final 5 kilometres (3 miles), but were unable to stay away and the race came down to a sprint.

The Movistar Team did much of the pace-setting in support of Valverde, before BMC Racing Team attempted to set up Greg Van Avermaet for the uphill sprint at the finish. Despite these efforts, Fabian Cancellara (Trek Factory Racing) was able to sprint to victory. Valverde was second, with Van Avermaet in third place. This victory meant that Cancellara took over the lead of both the general classification and the points competition. It was his first race victory since the 2014 Tour of Flanders the previous spring.

Stage 2 result
Rank	Rider	Team	Time
1	Fabian Cancellara (SUI)	Trek Factory Racing	4h 36' 46"
2	Alejandro Valverde (ESP)	Movistar Team	+ 0"
3	Greg Van Avermaet (BEL)	BMC Racing Team	+ 0"
4	Filippo Pozzato (ITA)	Lampre–Merida	+ 0"
5	Peter Sagan (SVK)	Tinkoff–Saxo	+ 0"
6	Julián Arredondo (COL)	Trek Factory Racing	+ 0"
7	Rafał Majka (POL)	Tinkoff–Saxo	+ 0"
8	Daniel Moreno (ESP)	Team Katusha	+ 0"
9	Andriy Hrivko (UKR)	Astana	+ 0"
10	Cameron Meyer (AUS)	Orica–GreenEDGE	+ 0"

General classification after stage 2
Rank	Rider	Team	Time
1	Fabian Cancellara (SUI)	Trek Factory Racing	8h 22' 14"
2	Alejandro Valverde (ESP)	Movistar Team	+ 4"
3	Patrick Konrad (AUT)	Bora–Argon 18	+ 5"
4	Greg Van Avermaet (BEL)	BMC Racing Team	+ 6"
5	Peter Sagan (SVK)	Tinkoff–Saxo	+ 10"
6	Damiano Caruso (ITA)	BMC Racing Team	+ 10"
7	Andriy Hrivko (UKR)	Astana	+ 10"
8	Daniel Moreno (ESP)	Team Katusha	+ 10"
9	Tejay van Garderen (USA)	BMC Racing Team	+ 10"
10	Julián Arredondo (COL)	Trek Factory Racing	+ 10"

=== Stage 3 ===
19 February 2015 — Al-Musannah Sports City to Al-Musannah Sports City, 158.5 km (98.5 mi)

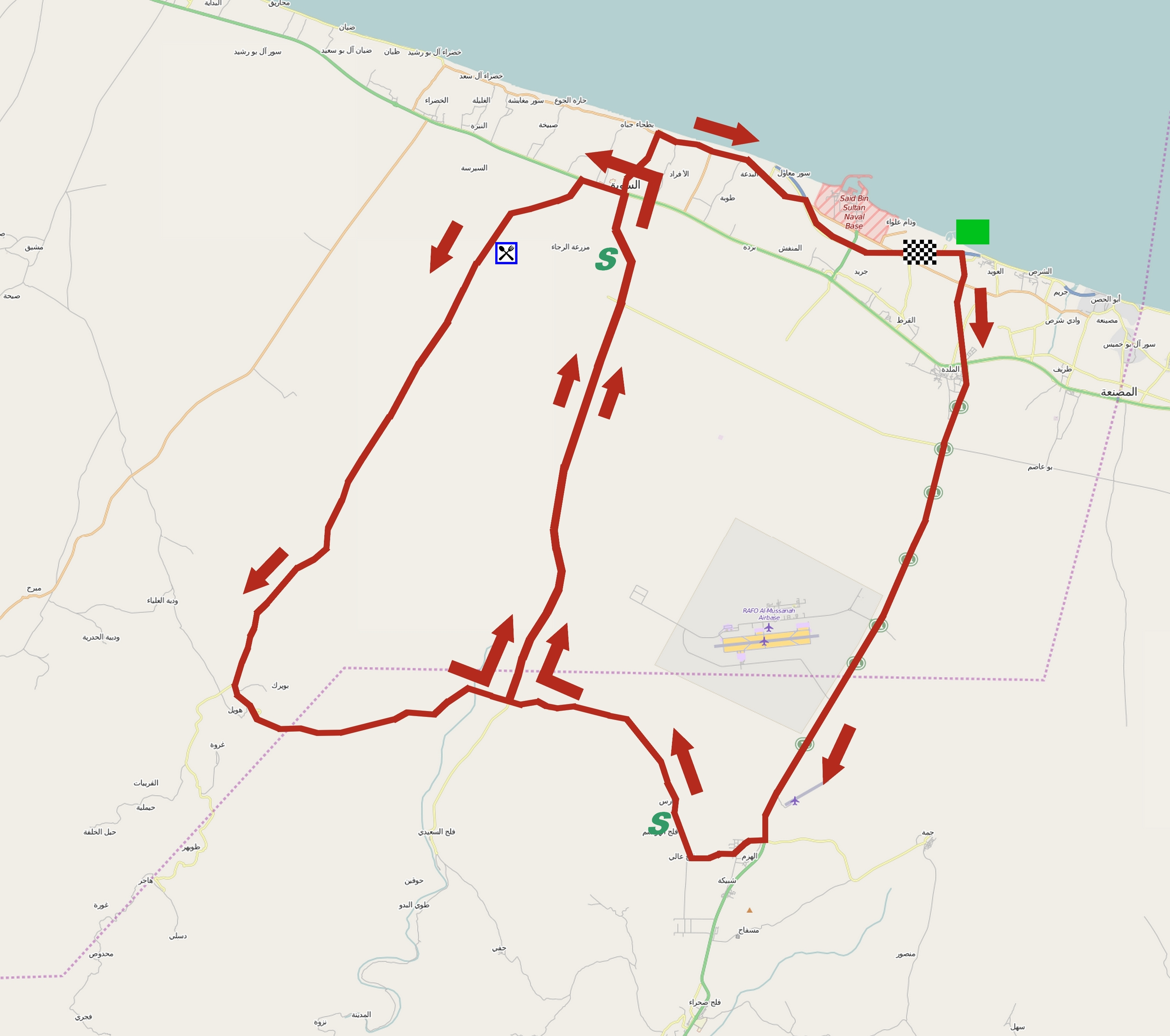
Stage 3 route

Stage 3 was a 158.5-kilometre (98-mile) route that started and ended at Al-Musannah Sports City. The route was mostly flat with no significant climbs and the roads at the finish were wide and straight, so the stage was likely to end in a bunch sprint.

Jef Van Meirhaeghe (Topsport Vlaanderen–Baloise) was again in the breakaway, along with his teammate Preben Van Hecke and Alessandro Tonelli (Bardiani–CSF). Initially there was a lack of agreement in the peloton about who should lead the chase. Trek Factory Racing were supporting race leader Fabian Cancellara, but they wanted the sprinters' teams to support the chase. The breakaway was therefore allowed a lead that reached nine minutes, but eventually agreement between the chasing teams brought control and the lead was reduced to six minutes. The breakaway was eventually caught with 15 kilometres (9 miles) remaining.

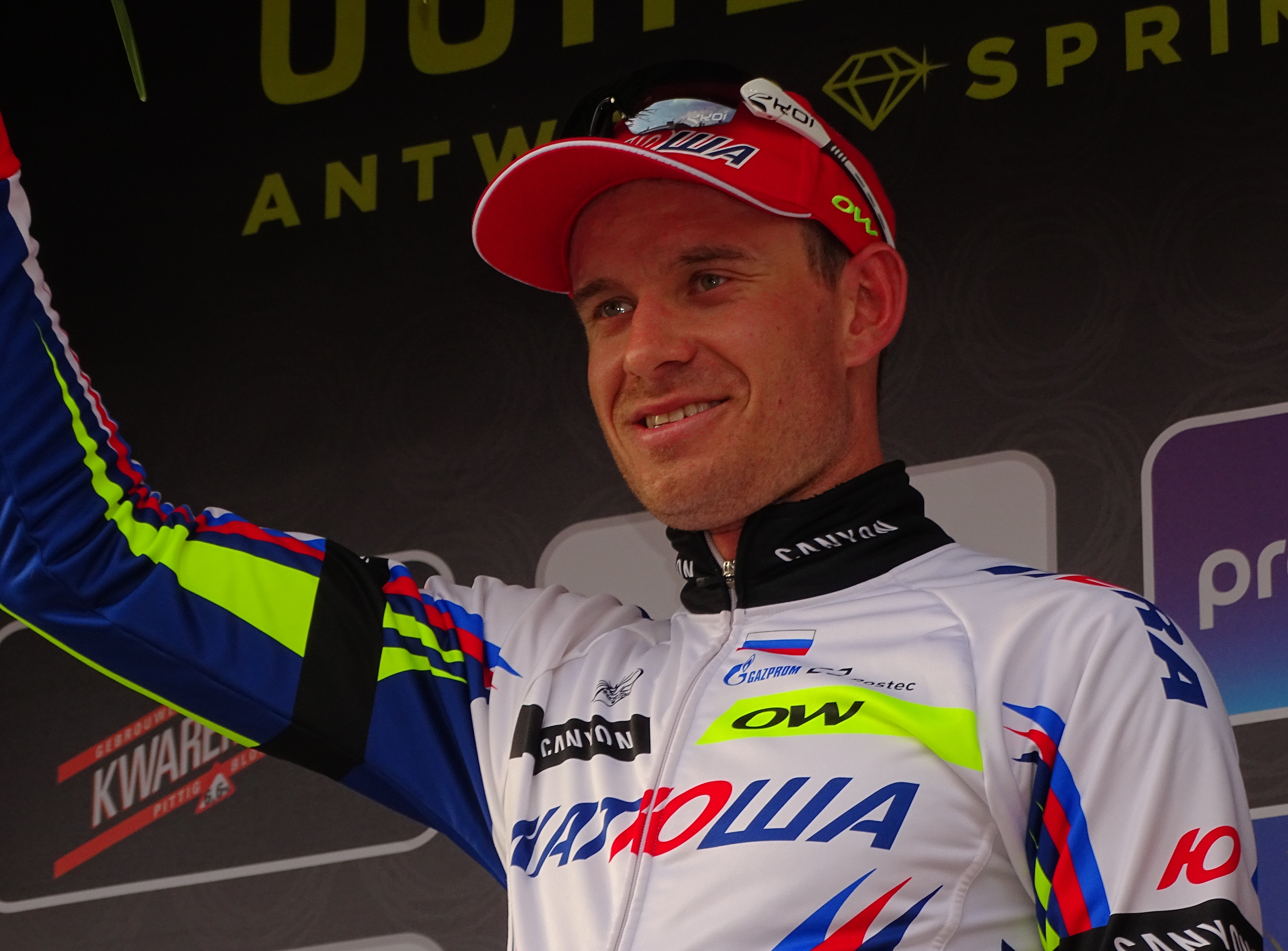
Alexander Kristoff, photographed at the 2015 Scheldeprijs, winner of stage 3

In the final 10 kilometres (6 miles) many teams, including Astana, Movistar Team, MTN–Qhubeka and Tinkoff–Saxo, sought to lead out their sprinters. In the confusion, Matteo Trentin (Etixx–Quick-Step) crashed and was forced to abandon the race. Team Katusha moved up in the final 5 kilometres (3 miles) in support of Alexander Kristoff. Kristoff's lead out train was strong and positioned him well for the final sprint. In the finishing straight, there was a significant headwind, and, when Danny van Poppel (Trek Factory Racing) opened his sprint too early, Kristoff was able to follow him and come round to take his fourth victory of the season, just ahead of Andrea Guardini (Astana). Cancellara retained his overall lead in the race.

Stage 3 result
Rank	Rider	Team	Time
1	Alexander Kristoff (NOR)	Team Katusha	3h 56' 42"
2	Andrea Guardini (ITA)	Astana	+ 0"
3	Matteo Pelucchi (ITA)	IAM Cycling	+ 0"
4	Nacer Bouhanni (FRA)	Cofidis	+ 0"
5	Danny van Poppel (NED)	Trek Factory Racing	+ 0"
6	Sacha Modolo (ITA)	Lampre–Merida	+ 0"
7	Matti Breschel (DEN)	Tinkoff–Saxo	+ 0"
8	Ramon Sinkeldam (NED)	Team Giant–Alpecin	+ 0"
9	Adam Blythe (GBR)	Orica–GreenEDGE	+ 0"
10	Tom Boonen (BEL)	Etixx–Quick-Step	+ 0"

General classification after stage 3
Rank	Rider	Team	Time
1	Fabian Cancellara (SUI)	Trek Factory Racing	12h 18' 56"
2	Alejandro Valverde (ESP)	Movistar Team	+ 4"
3	Patrick Konrad (AUT)	Bora–Argon 18	+ 5"
4	Greg Van Avermaet (BEL)	BMC Racing Team	+ 6"
5	Peter Sagan (SVK)	Tinkoff–Saxo	+ 10"
6	Damiano Caruso (ITA)	BMC Racing Team	+ 10"
7	Tejay van Garderen (USA)	BMC Racing Team	+ 10"
8	Andriy Hrivko (UKR)	Astana	+ 10"
9	Rafael Valls (ESP)	Lampre–Merida	+ 10"
10	Jakob Fuglsang (DEN)	Astana	+ 10"

=== Stage 4 ===
20 February 2015 — Sultan Qaboos Grand Mosque to Jebel Akhdar, 189 km (117.4 mi)

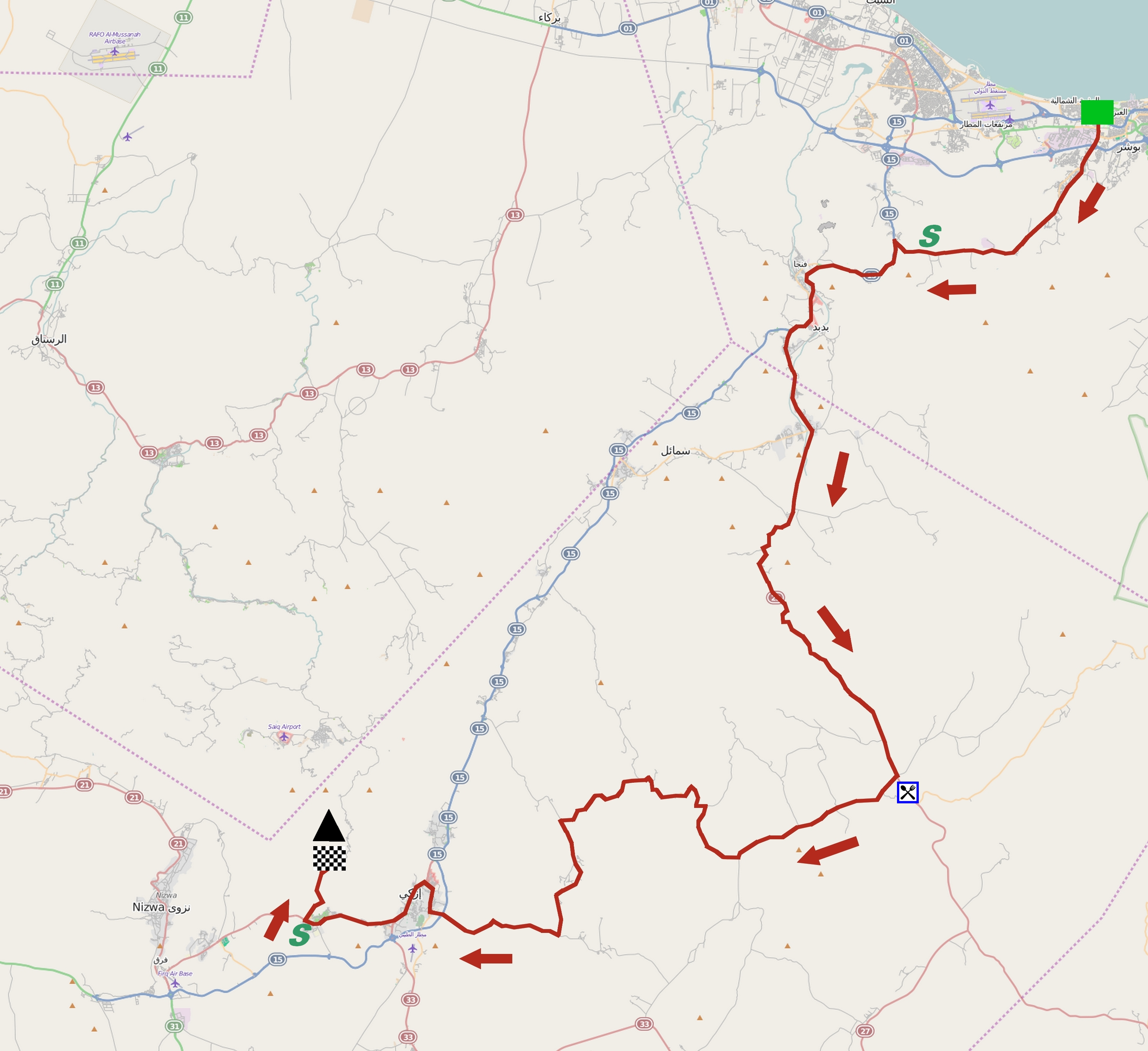
Stage 4 route

Stage 4 was the queen stage of the race, with a summit finish at the climb of Jebel Akhdar (the Green Mountain). The stage was a 189-kilometre (117-mile) route from the Sultan Qaboos Grand Mosque to Jebel Akhdar. There were no significant climbs in the route until the final 5.7 kilometres (4 miles), which had an average gradient of 10.5%.

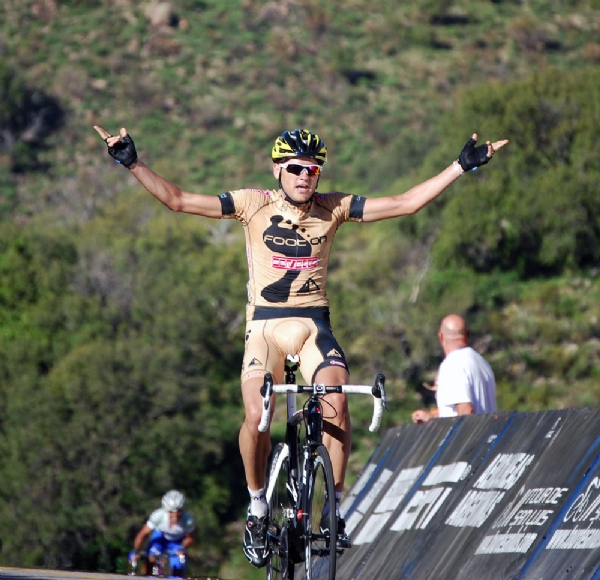
Rafael Valls, photographed in 2010, winner of stage 4 and the general classification

An early breakaway was formed of Jef Van Meirhaeghe (Topsport Vlaanderen–Baloise) (the leader of the combativity award and in the breakaway for the fourth consecutive stage), his teammate Gijs Van Hoecke, Stijn Vandenbergh (Etixx–Quick-Step) and points classification leader Andrea Guardini (Astana). Guardini and Van Meirhaeghe contested the intermediate sprint after 18.5 kilometres (11 miles), taking points for their respective classifications, then sat up and were caught by the peloton. Vandenbergh and Van Hoecke were allowed to build a lead of nearly 15 minutes, before the peloton increased its speed. The breakaway was caught with less than 10 kilometres (10 miles) to go.

BMC Racing Team led the peloton hard into the early slopes of Jebel Akhdar. This caused many riders, including race leader Fabian Cancellara, to be dropped, and a group of 20 riders formed. Vincenzo Nibali (Astana) put in two attacks, causing the group to be reduced further, in support of Jakob Fuglsang. More riders, including Alejandro Valverde (Movistar Team) were dropped, leaving a group of three riders in the lead with 1 kilometre (0.6 miles) to go: Rafał Majka (Tinkoff–Saxo), Tejay van Garderen (BMC Racing Team) and Rafael Valls (Lampre–Merida). Majka was unable to follow van Garderen's attacks, but Valls was able to stay in his wheel. Valls was then able to put in his own attack and pass van Garderen in the final part of the stage, going on to win by five seconds. It was his first victory in five years and gave him a 19-second lead in the overall standings. Van Garderen was frustrated after the stage, having also finished second on the same stage in 2014, behind Chris Froome. He said afterwards that he had "underestimated" Valls, who had not been considered among the favourites for stage victory. Louis Meintjes (MTN–Qhubeka) was eighth on the stage and moved into the white jersey as the best young rider.

Stage 4 result
Rank	Rider	Team	Time
1	Rafael Valls (ESP)	Lampre–Merida	5h 46' 48"
2	Tejay van Garderen (USA)	BMC Racing Team	+ 5"
3	Alejandro Valverde (ESP)	Movistar Team	+ 19"
4	Rafał Majka (POL)	Tinkoff–Saxo	+ 22"
5	Thibaut Pinot (FRA)	FDJ	+ 35"
6	Rui Costa (POR)	Lampre–Merida	+ 49"
7	Jacques Janse van Rensburg (RSA)	MTN–Qhubeka	+ 54"
8	Louis Meintjes (RSA)	MTN–Qhubeka	+ 58"
9	Ben Hermans (BEL)	BMC Racing Team	+ 1' 00"
10	Jakob Fuglsang (DEN)	Astana	+ 1' 00"

General classification after stage 4
Rank	Rider	Team	Time
1	Rafael Valls (ESP)	Lampre–Merida	18h 05' 44"
2	Tejay van Garderen (USA)	BMC Racing Team	+ 9"
3	Alejandro Valverde (ESP)	Movistar Team	+ 19"
4	Rafał Majka (POL)	Tinkoff–Saxo	+ 32"
5	Jacques Janse van Rensburg (RSA)	MTN–Qhubeka	+ 1' 04"
6	Louis Meintjes (RSA)	MTN–Qhubeka	+ 1' 08"
7	Jakob Fuglsang (DEN)	Astana	+ 1' 10"
8	Ben Hermans (BEL)	BMC Racing Team	+ 1' 15"
9	Julián Arredondo (COL)	Trek Factory Racing	+ 1' 25"
10	Patrick Konrad (AUT)	Bora–Argon 18	+ 1' 36"

=== Stage 5 ===
21 February 2015 — Al Sawadi Beach to Ministry of Housing, 151.5 km (94.1 mi)

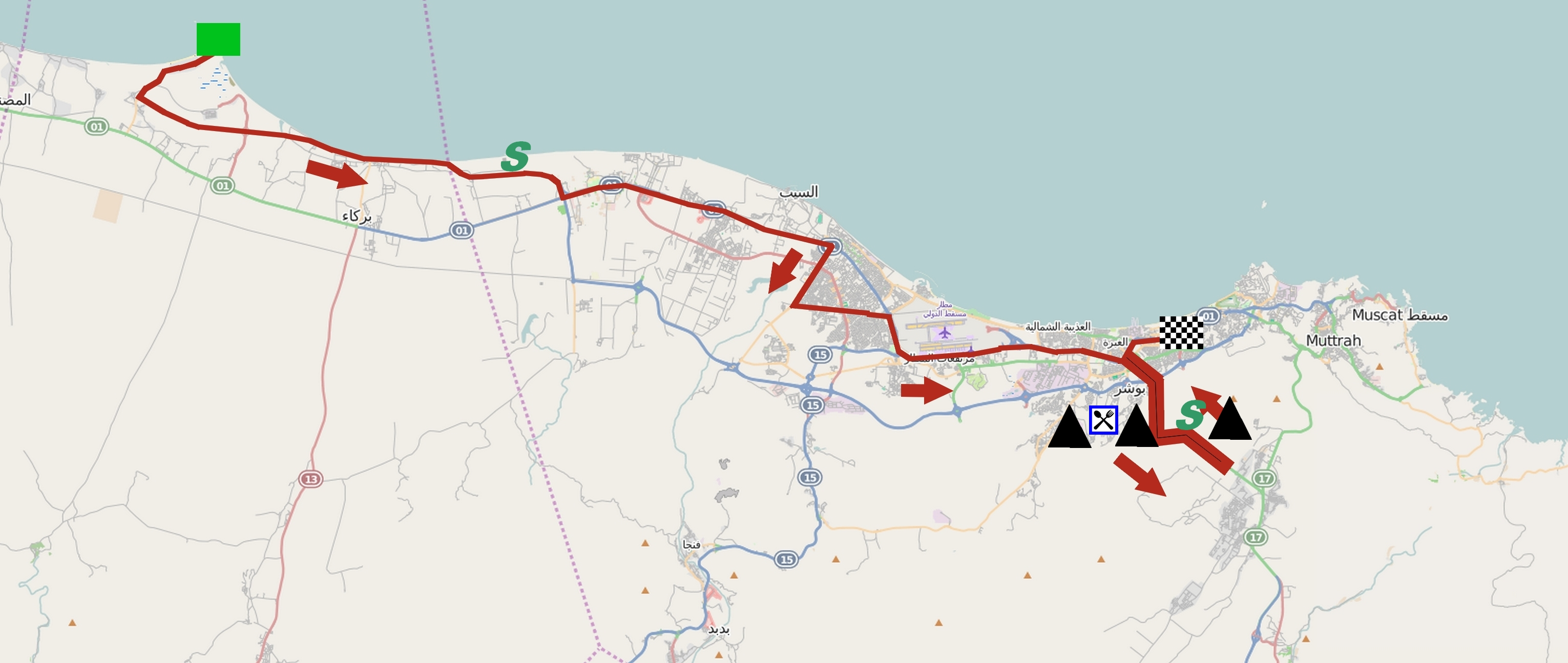
Stage 5 route

Stage 5 was scheduled to be a 151.5-kilometre (94-mile) route, beginning at Al Sawadi Beach. The planned route then went along the coast and included four laps of a circuit before finishing at the Ministry of Housing. Each lap of the circuit included the climb of Bousher al Amerat, a difficult climb. Equivalent stages in the 2013 and 2014 editions had been highly selective, and the stage was considered an opportunity for Tejay van Garderen (BMC Racing Team) to attempt to attack race leader Rafael Valls (Lampre–Merida).

Extreme weather conditions, however, made the stage impossible. There was a dust storm at the starting point on Al Sawadi Beach, so the decision was taken to transport the riders to the finishing circuit, shortening the stage to 95 kilometres (59 miles). When the riders arrived at the finishing circuit, however, they were now faced with very high temperatures, approximately 41 °C (106 °F). They started racing, but found themselves with problems due to the extreme heat. Several riders suffered punctures, especially during the fast descents, and problems with their brakes and the riders took the decision to neutralise the stage and took shelter under a bridge. The race organisers, led by race director Eddy Merckx, tried to persuade the riders to carry on, and at one point it was suggested that the cancellation of the stage could mean the end of the Tour of Oman altogether. It was eventually agreed, however, that the riders would take a short flat route to the stage finish.

With the stage abandoned, the standings in all the classifications remained unchanged.

Remained the general classification after stage 5
Rank	Rider	Team	Time
1	Rafael Valls (ESP)	Lampre–Merida	18h 05' 44"
2	Tejay van Garderen (USA)	BMC Racing Team	+ 9"
3	Alejandro Valverde (ESP)	Movistar Team	+ 19"
4	Rafał Majka (POL)	Tinkoff–Saxo	+ 32"
5	Jacques Janse van Rensburg (RSA)	MTN–Qhubeka	+ 1' 04"
6	Louis Meintjes (RSA)	MTN–Qhubeka	+ 1' 08"
7	Jakob Fuglsang (DEN)	Astana	+ 1' 10"
8	Ben Hermans (BEL)	BMC Racing Team	+ 1' 15"
9	Julián Arredondo (COL)	Trek Factory Racing	+ 1' 25"
10	Patrick Konrad (AUT)	Bora–Argon 18	+ 1' 36"

=== Stage 6 ===
22 February 2015 — Oman Air to Muttrah Promenade, 133.5 km (83.0 mi)

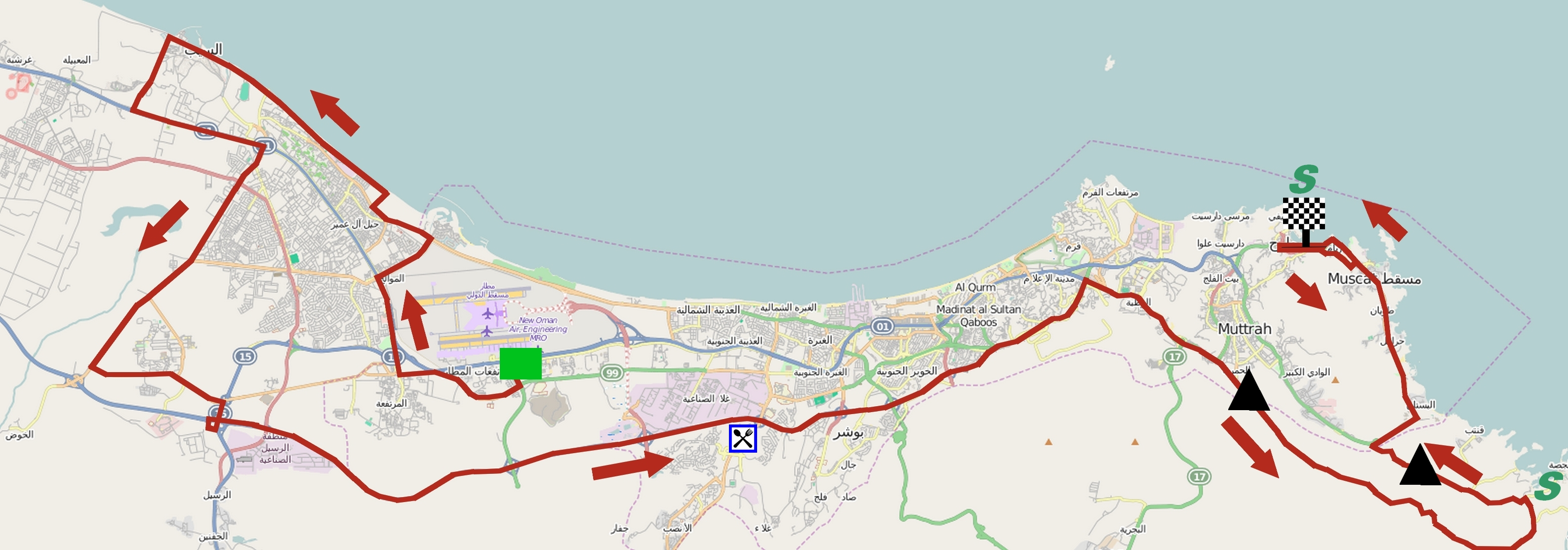
Stage 6 route

Stage 6 was a 133.5-kilometre (83.0-mile) route starting at the headquarters of Oman Air on the edge of Muscat International Airport. The route first followed the coast west, before turning inland and heading east. The race crossed two classified climbs on the edge of Muscat, before finishing on the corniche at Muttrah with three laps of a finishing circuit. The weather conditions were much more suitable for racing, with grey skies and the temperature approximately 20 °C (68 °F) lower than the previous day.

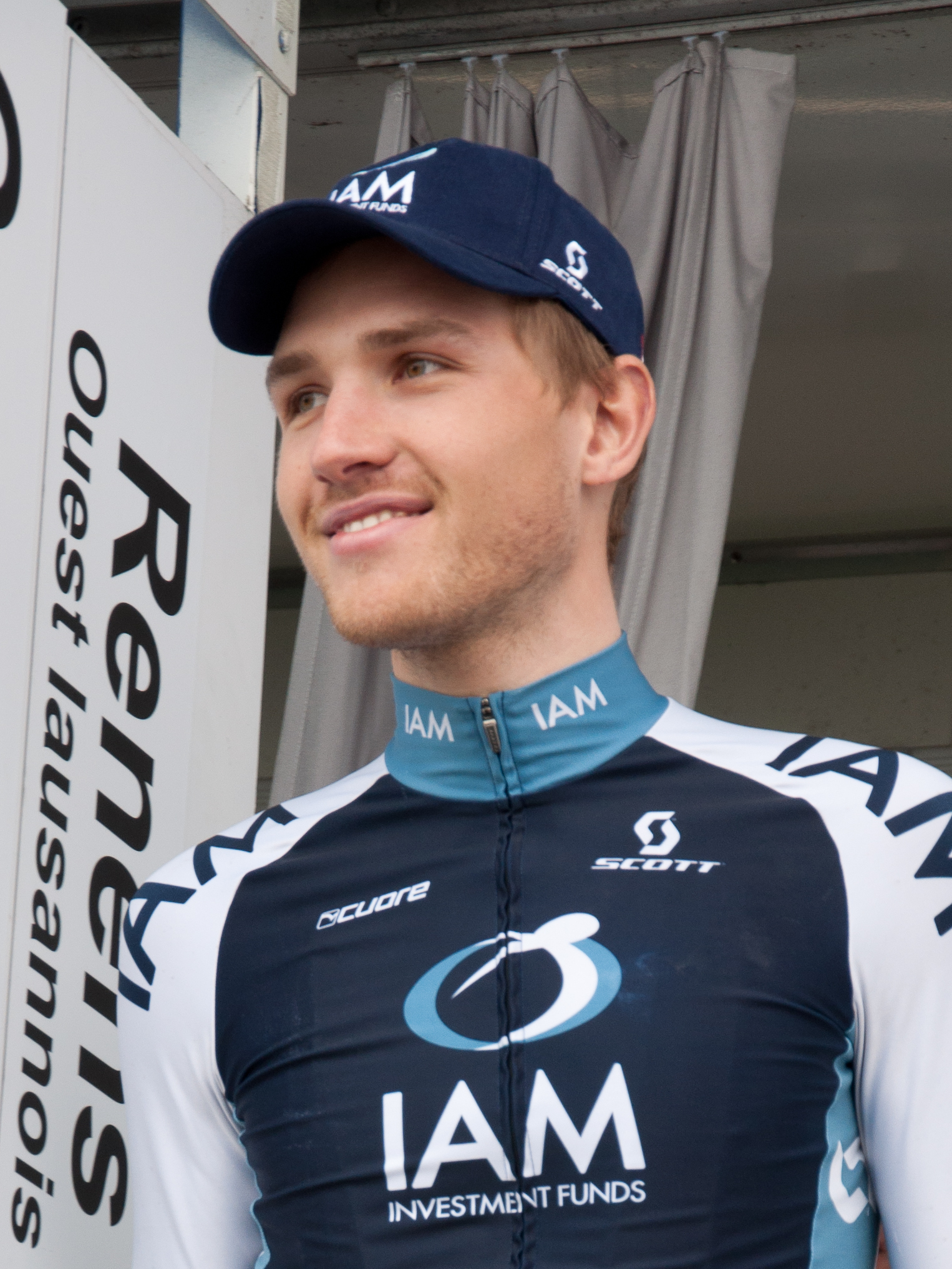
Matthias Brändle, photographed in 2013, winner of stage 6

The first riders to break away, were Iljo Keisse (Etixx–Quick-Step) and Jef Van Meirhaeghe (Topsport Vlaanderen–Baloise). Van Meirhaeghe was in the breakaway for the fifth time in the race: he had participated in the breakaway on every stage except the aborted stage 5. After his efforts earlier in the week, he struggled initially to stay with Keisse. The pair were joined, however, by Danny Pate (Team Sky) and Matthias Brändle (IAM Cycling), and Van Meirhaeghe was able to stay with the group. Jelle Wallays, Van Meirhaeghe's teammate, attempted to bridge across to the leading riders, but he was not able to make it across in the crosswinds and was caught by the main peloton. Lampre–Merida were happy to allow the breakaway a large lead as none of the riders posed any threat to Rafael Valls in the general classification, and they had a nine-minute lead with approximately 65 kilometres (40 miles) remaining.

The sprinters' teams attempted to chase the breakaway down. Principally this was led by Cofidis, who were hoping to set up Nacer Bouhanni for the stage win. However, the hills close to the finish made this difficult, as the breakaway were able to maintain their advantage on the technical descents. Andrea Guardini (Astana) was dropped on the last of these climbs. In the leading group, Pate made the first attack on the unclassified climb on the finishing circuit, but Brändle covered the move and passed him. Brändle was then able to hold off the chase of Keisse – the faster sprinter – and finished the stage with a four-second advantage. Van Meirhaeghe finished third with Pate fourth. In the peloton, Peter Sagan won the bunch sprint, over a minute behind Brändle. Rafael Valls was therefore able to secure the overall win, nine seconds ahead of Van Garderen, to take the first professional stage race win of his career.

Stage 6 result
Rank	Rider	Team	Time
1	Matthias Brändle (AUT)	IAM Cycling	3h 02' 31"
2	Iljo Keisse (BEL)	Etixx–Quick-Step	+ 4"
3	Jef Van Meirhaeghe (BEL)	Topsport Vlaanderen–Baloise	+ 13"
4	Danny Pate (USA)	Team Sky	+ 16"
5	Peter Sagan (SVK)	Tinkoff–Saxo	+ 1' 16"
6	Ramon Sinkeldam (NED)	Team Giant–Alpecin	+ 1' 16"
7	Nacer Bouhanni (FRA)	Cofidis	+ 1' 16"
8	Alexander Kristoff (NOR)	Team Katusha	+ 1' 16"
9	Alexey Lutsenko (KAZ)	Astana	+ 1' 16"
10	Sam Bennett (IRL)	Bora–Argon 18	+ 1' 16"

Final general classification
Rank	Rider	Team	Time
1	Rafael Valls (ESP)	Lampre–Merida	21h 09' 31"
2	Tejay van Garderen (USA)	BMC Racing Team	+ 9"
3	Alejandro Valverde (ESP)	Movistar Team	+ 19"
4	Rafał Majka (POL)	Tinkoff–Saxo	+ 32"
5	Jacques Janse van Rensburg (RSA)	MTN–Qhubeka	+ 1' 04"
6	Louis Meintjes (RSA)	MTN–Qhubeka	+ 1' 08"
7	Jakob Fuglsang (DEN)	Astana	+ 1' 10"
8	Ben Hermans (BEL)	BMC Racing Team	+ 1' 15"
9	Julián Arredondo (COL)	Trek Factory Racing	+ 1' 25"
10	Patrick Konrad (AUT)	Bora–Argon 18	+ 1' 36"

== Classification leadership ==
There were five principal classifications in the 2015 Tour of Oman.

The first and most important was the general classification; the winner of this was considered the overall winner of the race. It was calculated by adding together each rider's times on each stage, then applying bonuses. Bonuses were awarded for coming in the top three on a stage (10 seconds for the winner, 6 seconds for the second placed rider and 4 seconds for the rider in third) or at intermediate sprints (3 seconds, 2 seconds and 1 second for the top three riders). The rider in the lead of the general classification wore a red jersey.

The second competition was the points classification. This was calculated by awarding points for the top 10 riders at the finish of each stage (15 points to the winner down to 1 point for the rider in tenth place) and to the top three at intermediate sprints (3 points, 2 points and 1 point). The rider with the highest points total was the leader of the classification and wore a green jersey.

The young rider classification was open to those born on or after 1 January 1990. The young rider ranked highest in the general classification was the leader of the young rider classification and wore a white jersey.

The combativity classification was based on points won at intermediate sprints and classified climbs along the route. Points were awarded to the top three riders across each sprint or climb (3 points, 2 points and 1 point). The rider with the most accumulated points was the leader of the classification and wore a white jersey with red and green sections.

The final competition was the team classification. On each stage, each team was awarded a time based on the cumulative time of its top three riders. The times for each stage were then added together and the team with the lowest total time was the leader of the team classification.

Classification leadership by stage
Stage	Winner	General classification	Points classification	Young rider classification	Combativity classification	Team classification
1	Andrea Guardini	Andrea Guardini	Andrea Guardini	Patrick Konrad	Patrick Konrad	Team Giant–Alpecin
2	Fabian Cancellara	Fabian Cancellara	Fabian Cancellara	Patrick Konrad	Jef Van Meirhaeghe	BMC Racing Team
3	Alexander Kristoff	Fabian Cancellara	Andrea Guardini	Patrick Konrad	Jef Van Meirhaeghe	BMC Racing Team
4	Rafael Valls	Rafael Valls	Andrea Guardini	Louis Meintjes	Jef Van Meirhaeghe	BMC Racing Team
5	No winner	Rafael Valls	Andrea Guardini	Louis Meintjes	Jef Van Meirhaeghe	BMC Racing Team
6	Matthias Brändle	Rafael Valls	Andrea Guardini	Louis Meintjes	Jef Van Meirhaeghe	BMC Racing Team
Final		Rafael Valls	Andrea Guardini	Louis Meintjes	Jef Van Meirhaeghe	BMC Racing Team

== Classification standings ==
=== General classification ===
Result of general classification
Rank	Rider	Team	Time
1	Rafael Valls (ESP)	Lampre–Merida	21h 09' 31"
2	Tejay van Garderen (USA)	BMC Racing Team	+ 9"
3	Alejandro Valverde (ESP)	Movistar Team	+ 19"
4	Rafał Majka (POL)	Tinkoff–Saxo	+ 32"
5	Jacques Janse van Rensburg (RSA)	MTN–Qhubeka	+ 1' 04"
6	Louis Meintjes (RSA)	MTN–Qhubeka	+ 1' 08"
7	Jakob Fuglsang (DEN)	Astana	+ 1' 10"
8	Ben Hermans (BEL)	BMC Racing Team	+ 1' 15"
9	Julián Arredondo (COL)	Trek Factory Racing	+ 1' 25"
10	Patrick Konrad (AUT)	Bora–Argon 18	+ 1' 36"

=== Points classification ===
Result of points classification
Rank	Rider	Team	Points
1	Andrea Guardini (ITA)	Astana	31
2	Jef Van Meirhaeghe (BEL)	Topsport Vlaanderen–Baloise	31
3	Alexander Kristoff (NOR)	Team Katusha	24
4	Alejandro Valverde (ESP)	Movistar Team	21
5	Matteo Pelucchi (ITA)	IAM Cycling	18
6	Peter Sagan (SVK)	Tinkoff–Saxo	16
7	Nacer Bouhanni (FRA)	Cofidis	16
8	Rafael Valls (ESP)	Lampre–Merida	15
9	Fabian Cancellara (SUI)	Trek Factory Racing	15
10	Matthias Brändle (AUT)	IAM Cycling	15

=== Young rider classification ===
Result of young rider classification
Rank	Rider	Team	Time
1	Louis Meintjes (RSA)	MTN–Qhubeka	21h 10' 39"
2	Patrick Konrad (AUT)	Bora–Argon 18	+ 28"
3	Georg Preidler (AUT)	Team Giant–Alpecin	+ 2' 45"
4	Warren Barguil (FRA)	Team Giant–Alpecin	+ 3' 02"
5	Damien Howson (AUS)	Orica–GreenEDGE	+ 3' 55"
6	Thibaut Pinot (FRA)	FDJ	+ 4' 36"
7	Francesco Manuel Bongiorno (ITA)	Bardiani–CSF	+ 7' 10"
8	Sonny Colbrelli (ITA)	Bardiani–CSF	+ 7' 20"
9	Victor Campenaerts (BEL)	Topsport Vlaanderen–Baloise	+ 7' 43"
10	Peter Sagan (SVK)	Tinkoff–Saxo	+ 8' 21"

=== Combativity classification ===
Result of combativity classification
Rank	Rider	Team	Points
1	Jef Van Meirhaeghe (BEL)	Topsport Vlaanderen–Baloise	27
2	Danny Pate (USA)	Team Sky	8
3	Gatis Smukulis (LAT)	Team Katusha	6
4	Iljo Keisse (BEL)	Etixx–Quick-Step	6
5	Preben Van Hecke (BEL)	Topsport Vlaanderen–Baloise	6
6	Patrick Konrad (AUT)	Bora–Argon 18	5
7	Andrea Guardini (ITA)	Astana	4
8	Rafael Valls (ESP)	Lampre–Merida	3
9	Julián Arredondo (COL)	Trek Factory Racing	3
10	Johann van Zyl (RSA)	MTN–Qhubeka	3

=== Team classification ===
Result of team classification
Rank	Team	Time
1	BMC Racing Team	63h 33' 29"
2	Tinkoff–Saxo	+ 9"
3	MTN–Qhubeka	+ 54"
4	Astana	+ 1' 26"
5	Lampre–Merida	+ 2' 30"
6	Team Sky	+ 4' 02"
7	IAM Cycling	+ 4' 18"
8	Bora–Argon 18	+ 4' 42"
9	Team Giant–Alpecin	+ 6' 40"
10	Orica–GreenEDGE	+ 7' 28"

== Controversy over stage 5 ==
The 2015 race included one significant controversy: the conditions on stage 5 that led to the stage's cancellation. After a sandstorm had caused the start of the race to be relocated, very high temperatures (somewhere between 38 °C (100 °F) and 49 °C (120 °F)) caused several riders' tyres to puncture. This was especially the case on the neutralised descents, as the slow speeds and consequent frequent braking led to higher tyre temperatures and more punctures. Many riders had concerns for their safety on the descents, and a rider protest brought the race to a halt.

Riders engaged in a lengthy discussion with the race organisers, who were represented by Eddy Merckx, considered one of the greatest cyclists ever, who was part-owner of the race. The Omani organisers, led by Salim bin Mubarak Al Hassani, put pressure on the riders to continue racing, but they refused to do so. The riders were led by Tom Boonen (Etixx–Quick-Step) and Fabian Cancellara (Trek Factory Racing), who cited the danger of continuing to race in the conditions, suggesting that their lives were at risk. The stage was eventually neutralised and the riders returned to the finish line by a flat route.

After the race, Merckx publicly dismissed the riders' complaints. In particular, he made comparisons with the dangers that are accepted by the riders, such as those faced when riding Paris–Roubaix or descending on wet days in the Tour de France. Merckx also said that he was worried about the future of the race, as the local organisers were angry at the cancellation of the stage and had wanted to cancel stage 6 as well. He was also concerned about the renewal of the contract to run the Tour of Oman, after it expired in 2016. Before the final stage – which did go ahead – he had agreed with the local authorities that the race would continue in 2016. It was suggested, however, that the local organisers may refuse to invite certain teams back to future editions of the race. These teams possibly included Etixx–Quick-Step and Trek Factory Racing since their riders were central to the rider protest.
