= 2010 Tour de San Luis =

Race details
- Dates: January 18 – January 24
- Stages: 7
- Distance: 1,018.4 km (632.8 mi)
- Winning time: 25h 44' 47"

Results
Jersey awarded to the overall winner	Winner	Vincenzo Nibali (ITA)	(Liquigas–Doimo)
	Second	José Serpa (COL)	(Androni Giocattoli)
	Third	Rafael Valls (ESP)	(Footon–Servetto–Fuji)
Jersey awarded to the mountains classification winner	Mountains	Rafael Valls (ESP)	(Footon–Servetto–Fuji)
Jersey awarded to the youth classification winner	Youth	Yosue Moyano (ARG)	(Argentina)
Jersey awarded to the sprints classification winner	Sprints	Walter Pérez (ARG)	(Argentina)
	Team	(Venezuela) Androni Giocattoli	

The 2010 Tour de San Luis was a men's road cycling race held from 18 to January 24, 2010, in Argentina. The fourth edition of this road racing event was a multiple stage race with seven stages and a total length of 1018.4 kilometres.

== Stage summary ==
Stage	Date	Start	Finish	Distance	Stage Top 3
1	18 January	San Luis	Villa Mercedes	168.4 km	Francesco Chicchi (ITA); Edgardo Simón (ARG); Danilo Napolitano (ITA)
2	19 January	Potrero de los Funes	Mirador El Potrero	157 km	Rafael Valls (ESP); Arnols Alcolea (CUB); Jackson Rodríguez (VEN)
3	20 January	Fraga	Buena Esperanza	199.7 km	Alberto Loddo (ITA); Danilo Napolitano (ITA); Francesco Chicchi (ITA)
4	21 January	San Luis	San Luis	19.8 km	Vincenzo Nibali (ITA); Robert Bengsch (GER); Alexander Kolobnev (RUS)
5	22 January	San Luis	La Carolina	156.4 km	Jackson Rodríguez (VEN); Rafael Valls (ESP); Pedro Nicasio (BRA)
6	23 January	Quines	Mirador del Sol	150 km	Luis Mate (ESP); José Serpa (COL); Vincenzo Nibali (ITA)
7	24 January	San Luis	San Luis	167.1 km	Alberto Loddo (ITA); Danilo Napolitano (ITA); Francisco Pacheco (ESP)
