= Jef Van Meirhaeghe =

Belgian cyclist

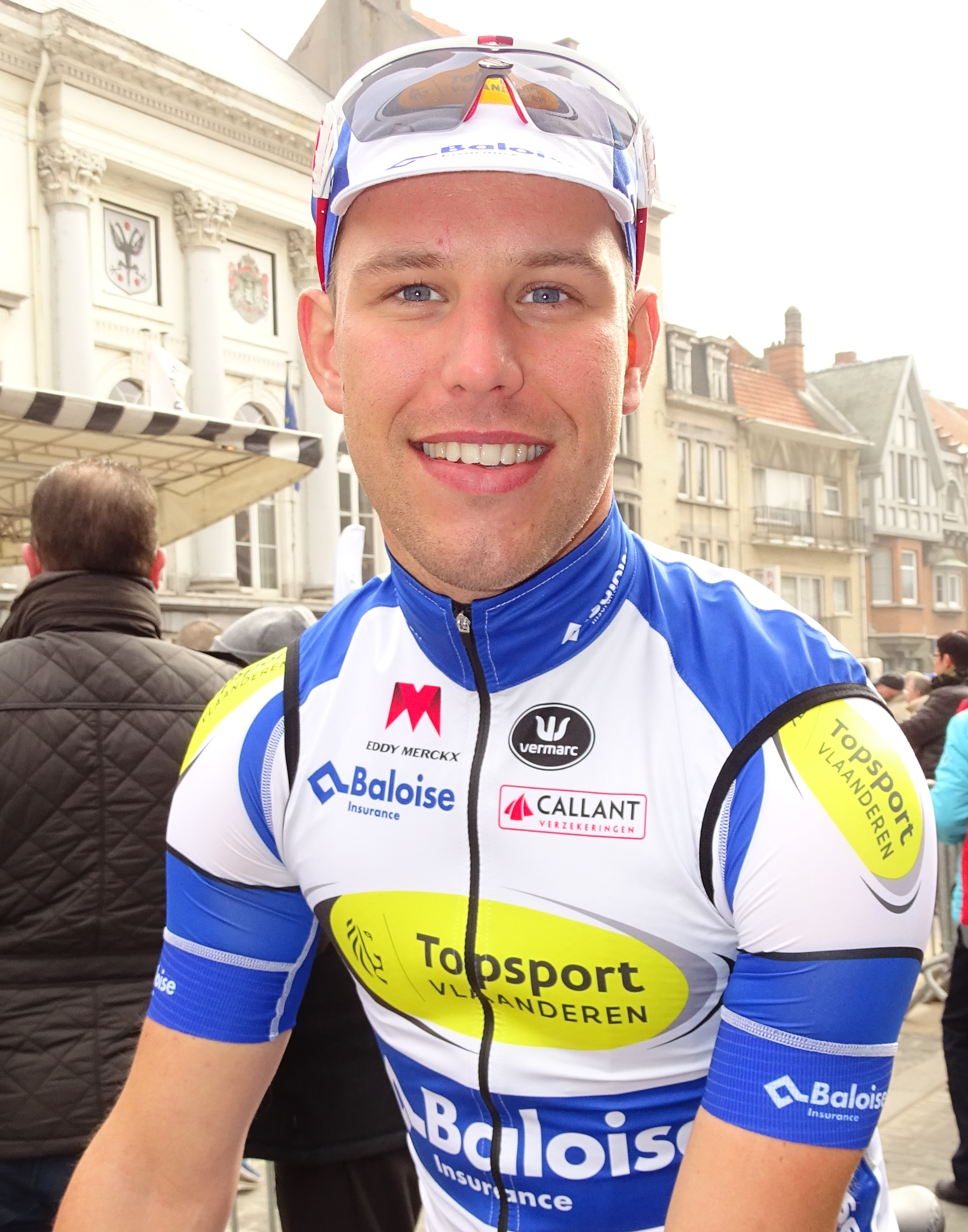
- Van Meirhaeghe at the 2015 Nokere Koerse.

Personal information
- Full name: Jef Van Meirhaeghe
- Born: January 21, 1992 (age 34) Ghent, Belgium

Cycling career
- Sport: Cycling
- Discipline: Road
- Role: Rider

Amateur teams
- 2010: Cube–Fintro
- 2011: Soenens–Construkt Glas
- 2012–2014: Lotto–Belisol U23
- 2017: Espira Cycling Team
- 2018: Mysenlan–SPIE–Dourteloigne
- 2020: The Avengers
- 2021: CT Stroobant–Bataia

Professional team
- 2015–2016: Topsport Vlaanderen–Baloise

Jef Van Meirhaeghe (born 21 January 1992) is a Belgian road cyclist, who most recently rode for Belgian amateur team CT Stroobant–Bataia. Van Meirhaeghe has also competed professionally for Topsport Vlaanderen–Baloise in 2015 and 2016.

== Career ==
=== Amateur career ===
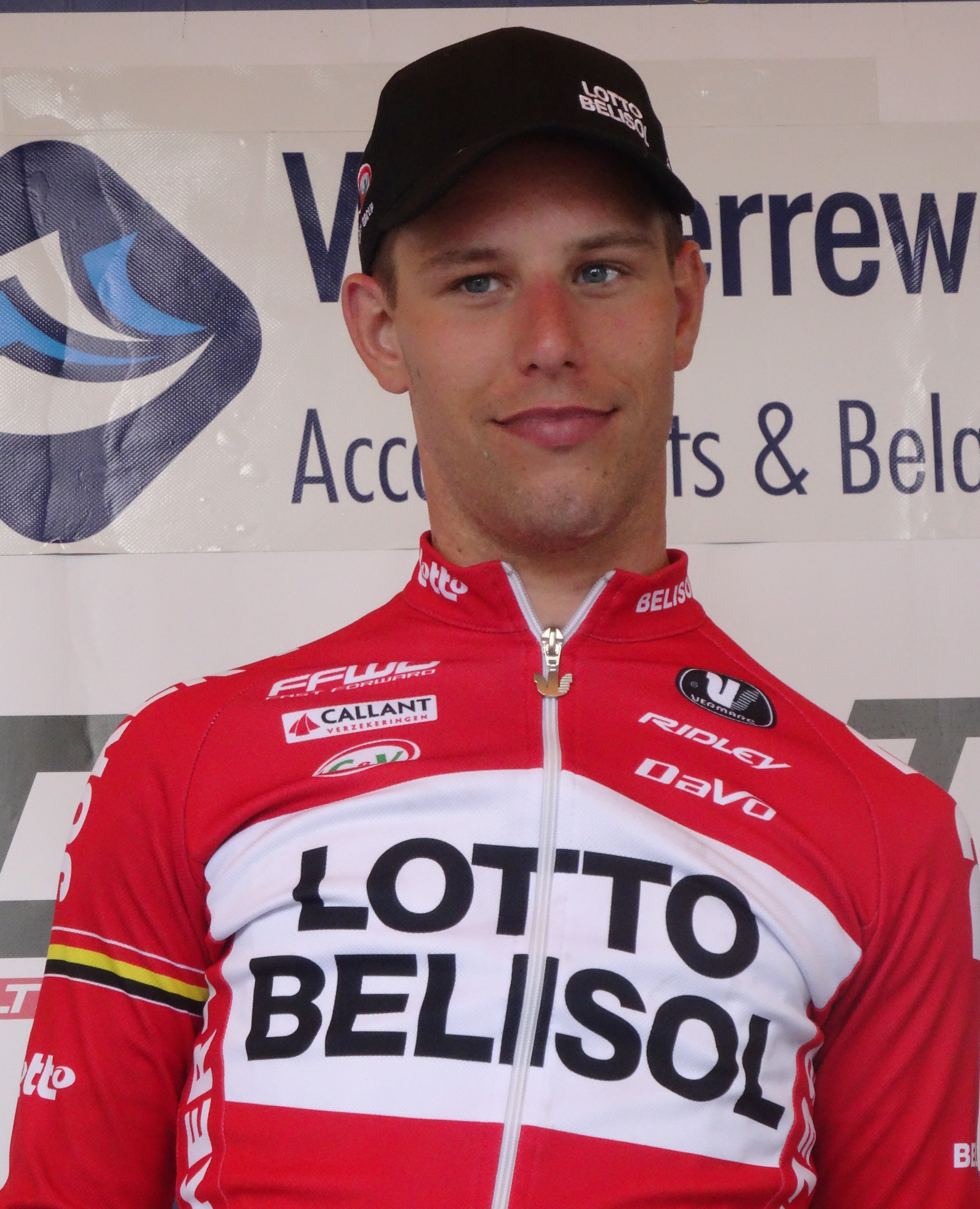
Van Meirhaeghe at the 2014 Omloop Het Nieuwsblad U23, where he finished in third place.

As a junior, Van Meirhaeghe won the 2010 Junior Tour of Flanders. After a year riding for the Soenens–Construkt Glas team, he rode for the Lotto–Belisol U23 team from 2012 to 2014. In May 2014, he finished in the top ten of the Paris–Arras Tour, his best stage-race result to that point. In July 2014, he finished on the podium of the under-23 edition of Omloop Het Nieuwsblad, having been in a breakaway with the eventual race winner, Dimitri Claeys. During this time he rode principally as a domestique for other riders, rarely having a chance to race for himself.

In August 2014, Van Meirhaeghe became the under-23 Belgian national road race champion, winning the race in a solo breakaway despite a gear-shift problem. Shortly after this victory, it was announced that Van Meirhaeghe was among six neo-professionals to sign for the Topsport Vlaanderen–Baloise Professional Continental cycling team for the 2015 season.

=== Professional career ===
His first race for the team came at the 2015 Tour of Qatar. He subsequently raced in the 2015 Tour of Oman. He joined the breakaway on the first stage in an attempt to gain the young rider's jersey but failed. He then entered the breakaway on every subsequent stage of the race and was awarded the combativity jersey at the end of the race. On the final stage of the race, Van Meirhaeghe was part of the breakaway group that stayed away to the end of the race. He was tired following his efforts earlier in the race and did not even need to enter the breakaway in order to win the combativity classification, but he was ultimately able to stay with the leading riders. In the final part of the stage, he was beaten by his companions Matthias Brändle and Iljo Keisse; he took third place on the stage, which was the biggest result of his career to that point.

== Major results ==
2011
7th Grand Prix Impanis-Van Petegem
2012
6th Memorial Van Coningsloo
2013
4th Overall Carpathian Couriers Race
2014
1st Road race, National Under-23 Road Championships
3rd Omloop Het Nieuwsblad U23
8th Overall Paris–Arras Tour
8th Antwerpse Havenpijl
2015
1st Combativity classification Tour of Oman
2nd Grand Prix Criquielion
