= Sohar Hospital =

- Wilayat Sohar

Geography
- Location: Sohar, Batinah Region, Oman
- Coordinates: 24.32729594313051°N 56.678700983401164°E

Organisation
- Type: Teaching
- Affiliated university: Oman Medical College

Services
- Emergency department: Yes
- Beds: 408

History
- Opened: 1997

Links
- Lists: Hospitals in Oman

Sohar Hospital under the Ministry of Health, Oman was set up in 1997 and is a 408-bed tertiary care hospital of wilayat Sohar. It aims to cater to the population of North Batinah Region extending from Suweiq to Shinaz. It is a multispeciality hospital having a fully equipped Adult ICU, Paediatric ICU, CCU apart from facilities for Dialysis. The Operative facilities consists of Laparoscopic surgeries in surgery, Abdominal surgeries as well as Arthroscopy and Endoscopic Sinus Surgery. It is a teaching hospital for students of Oman Medical College (second medical college in The Sultanate of Oman). The majority of hospital staff comprises expatriates including doctors and paramedics.
