= Sultan Qaboos Hospital Salalah =

- Ministry of Health

Geography
- Location: Salalah, Dhofar Governorate, Oman
- Coordinates: 17.00558914367069°N 54.05532807089646°E

Organisation
- Type: Teaching

Services
- Beds: 450

History
- Opened: 1979

Links
- Lists: Hospitals in Oman

Sultan Qaboos hospital is a 450-bed tertiary care hospital in the Dhofar Governorate capital of Salalah, Oman. It is under the administrative control of the Oman's Ministry of Health.

== Overview ==
It has multidisciplinary departments which include General medicine, surgery, pediatrics, gynaecology and obstetrics, ENT, ophthalmology, dermatology, plastic surgery dental surgery. It is served by doctors from India, Bangladesh, Pakistan, Egypt, Sudan, Philippines, Sri Lanka and Oman amongst others. It serves as a referral point of around 35 primary health care centres in Dhofar. There is also a nursing institute. Recently an extended health centre (polyclinic) has come up within the Sultan Qaboos hospital campus, which houses OPDs of multiple specialties. A well maintained canteen caters to patients, visitors and staff. There is a Directorate building which houses the administrative departments, besides a nurses quarter and a guest house. There is also a well equipped Auditorium, audio-visual centre for workshops, meetings, seminars, etc. A well stocked reference library is also available for the staff members.
