= Healthcare in Oman =

Omani nationals have free access to the country's public healthcare, though expatriates typically seek medical care in private sector clinics and hospitals. Generally, the standard of care in the public sector is high for a middle-income country. Oman now has very low rate of once common communicable diseases such as measles and typhoid. Due to rapidly increasing incomes and changing lifestyles and diet, the levels of non-communicable diseases such as cardiovascular disease and diabetes are an increasing problem.

The hospitals in Oman generally provide a high quality of health care. Most of the largest and most advanced hospitals and health centres are located in Muscat, such as the Royal Hospital of Oman and the Sultan Qaboos University Hospital.

Life expectancy in Oman

Though the Omanis have a high life expectancy of 73.8 the nation's medical industry can not be compared to other more developed countries. Still the government is trying to develop this sector and encourage students to study medicine. Although a sizeable portion of the healthcare workforce is foreign born, due to an aggressive government policy of Omanization, this is beginning to change. The country now has an accredited medical university and many Omani doctors have obtained their medical training in countries such as Australia, Canada, the United Kingdom and the United States.

== See also ==
- Health in Oman
- List of hospitals in Oman
