= Health in Oman =

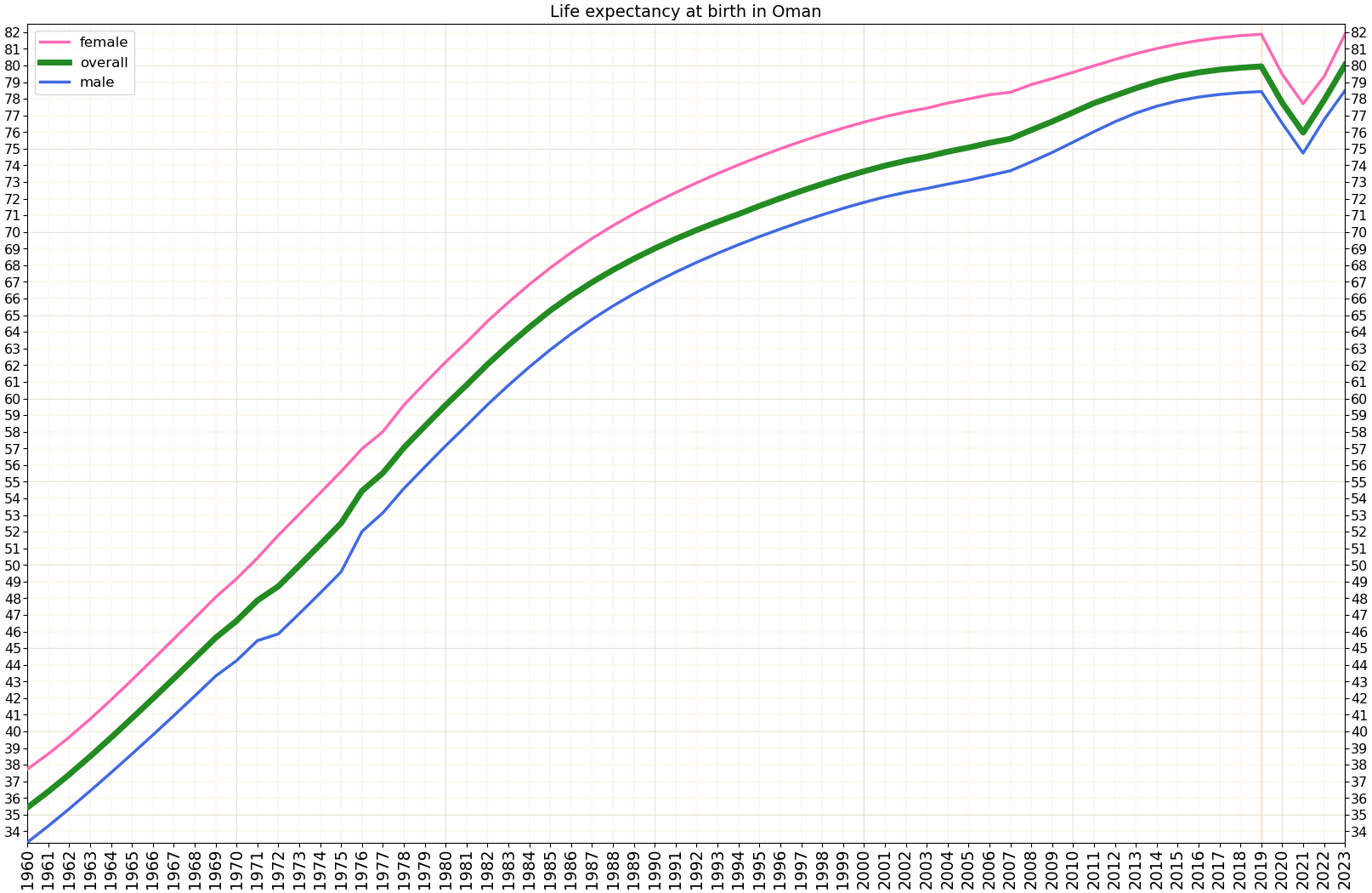
Life expectancy in Oman

Life expectancy at birth in 2013 was 74 for men and 79 for women.

== Obesity ==
In 2014 Sultan Qaboos University published research showing that 30% of the Omani population was overweight and 20% was obese.

== Smoking ==
A ban on smoking in public places was introduced in 2010. Restaurants, malls and other public places were required to allot more than 50% of their space as non-smoking zones. 70% of residents suffer from some kind of curable disease related to smoking.

== See also ==
- Healthcare in Oman
- List of hospitals in Oman
