= Rafael Valls =

Spanish road bicycle racer (born 1987)

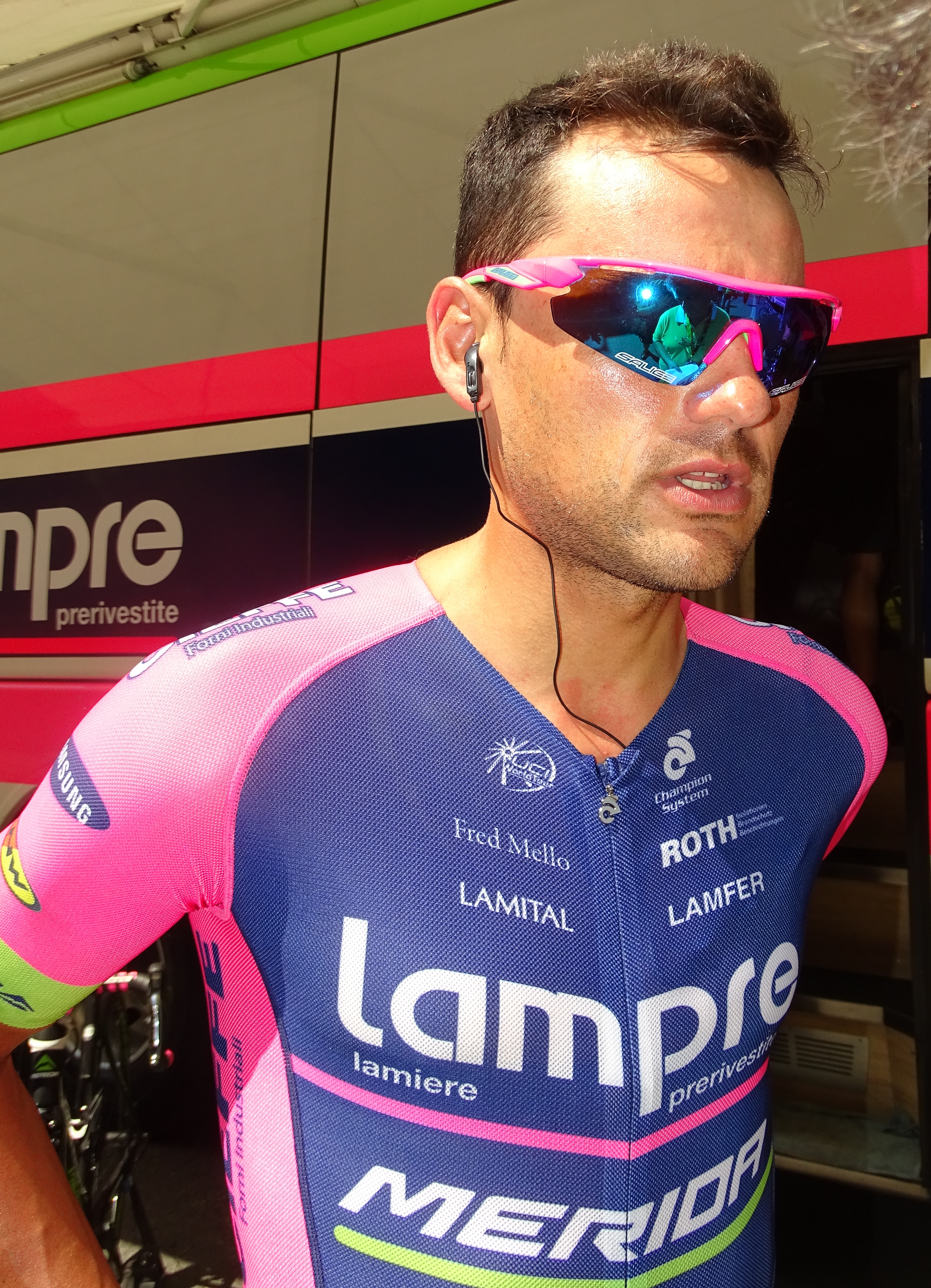
- Valls at the 2015 Tour de France.

Personal information
- Full name: Rafael Valls Ferri
- Born: 25 June 1987 (age 39) Cocentaina, Spain
- Height: 1.79 m (5 ft 10 in)
- Weight: 64 kg (141 lb)

Cycling career
- Sport: Cycling
- Current team: Team Jayco–AlUla
- Discipline: Road
- Role: Rider (retired); Directeur sportif
- Rider type: Climber

Amateur teams
- 2007: Relax–GAM (stagiaire)
- 2008: Scott–American Beef (stagiaire)

Professional teams
- 2009: Burgos Monumental–Castilla y León
- 2010–2011: Footon–Servetto–Fuji
- 2012–2013: Vacansoleil–DCM
- 2014–2015: Lampre–Merida
- 2016–2017: Lotto–Soudal
- 2018–2019: Movistar Team
- 2020–2021: Bahrain–McLaren

Managerial team
- 2023–: Team Jayco–AlUla

Major wins
- Stage races Tour of Oman (2015)

Rafael Valls Ferri (born 25 June 1987) is a Spanish former professional road bicycle racer, who rode professionally between 2009 and 2021 for seven different teams. Valls took four victories during his professional career – a stage at the 2010 Tour de San Luis, a stage and the general classification at the 2015 Tour of Oman, and a win in the 2019 Prueba Villafranca de Ordizia one-day race.

Following his retirement, Valls now works as a directeur sportif for UCI WorldTeam Team Jayco–AlUla.

== Career ==
Born in Cocentaina, Valls left Vacansoleil–DCM at the end of the 2013 season, and joined Lampre–Merida for the 2014 season. In 2015, Valls had his biggest victory to that point by winning the Tour of Oman and its fourth stage. In September 2015 it was announced that Valls would join Lotto–Soudal from 2016 on a two-year deal. In August 2020, he was named in the startlist for the 2020 Tour de France. However, he crashed on the opening stage, and abandoned the race.

At the end of the following year, Valls retired from the sport, despite holding a contract until the end of the 2022 season.

== Major results ==
2005
3rd Time trial, National Junior Road Championships
2008
9th Overall Grand Prix du Portugal
2009
4th Overall Circuito Montañés
10th Overall Tour de l'Avenir
2010
2nd Trofeo Inca
3rd Overall Tour de San Luis

1st Mountains classification
1st Stage 2

9th Trofeo Deia
2014
8th Overall Settimana Internazionale di Coppi e Bartali
2015
1st Overall Tour of Oman

1st Stage 4

8th Overall Paris–Nice
8th Overall Volta a Catalunya
2016
8th Overall Tour Down Under
2017
7th Overall Tour Down Under
10th Overall Critérium du Dauphiné
2019
1st Prueba Villafranca de Ordizia
2020
9th Overall Route d'Occitanie

=== Grand Tour general classification results timeline ===
Grand Tour	2010	2011	2012	2013	2014	2015	2016	2017	2018	2019	2020	2021
Giro d'Italia	—	DNF	—	29	—	—	—	—	DNF	—	—	96
Tour de France	53	—	41	—	DNF	78	—	—	—	—	DNF	—
Vuelta a España	—	—	DNF	43	—	—	—	—	—	—	—	—

Legend
—	Did not compete
DNF	Did not finish
