= Ruwi =

Town in Oman

Coordinates: 23°36′01″N 58°32′36″E

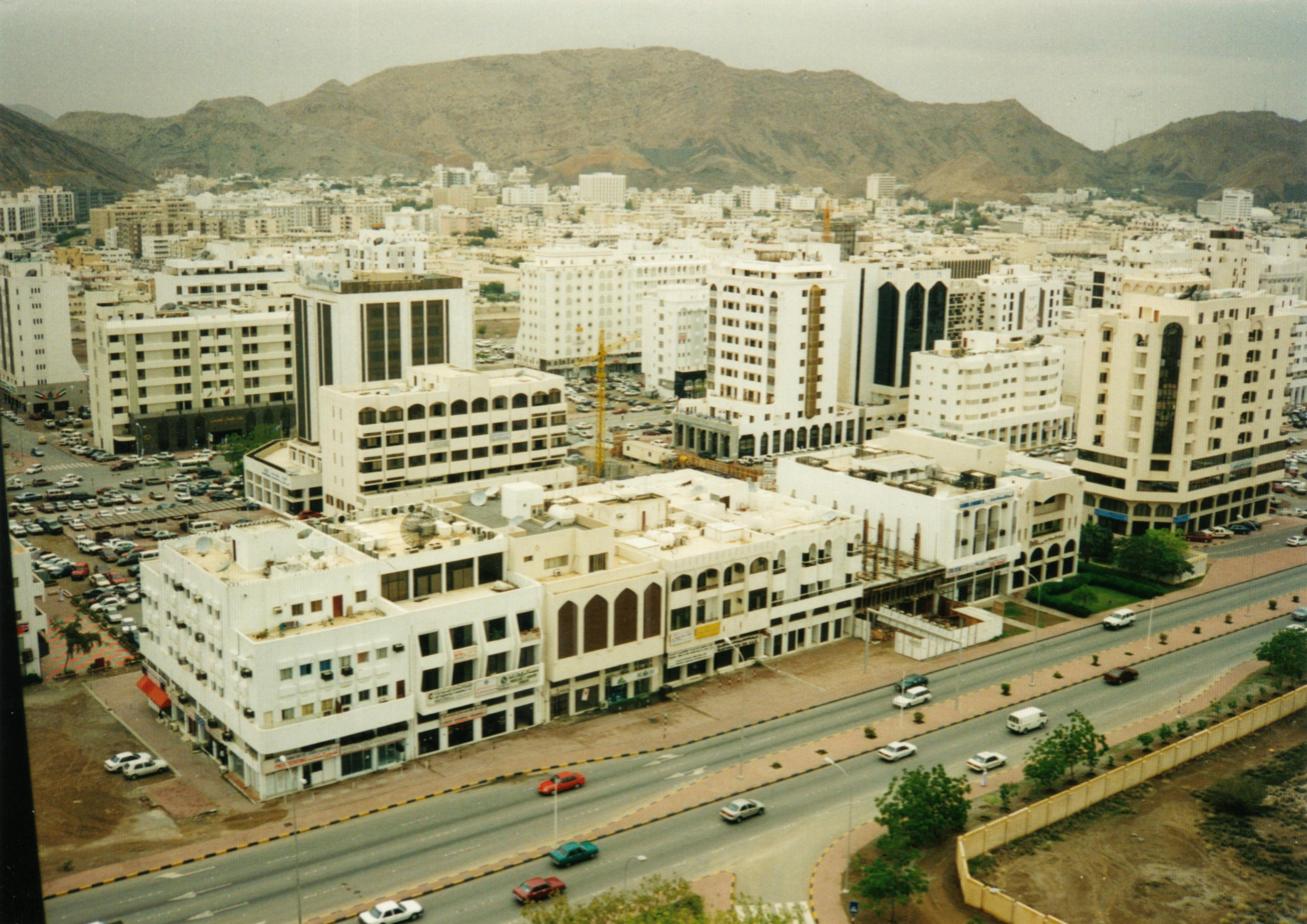
Ruwi, the main business district of Muscat

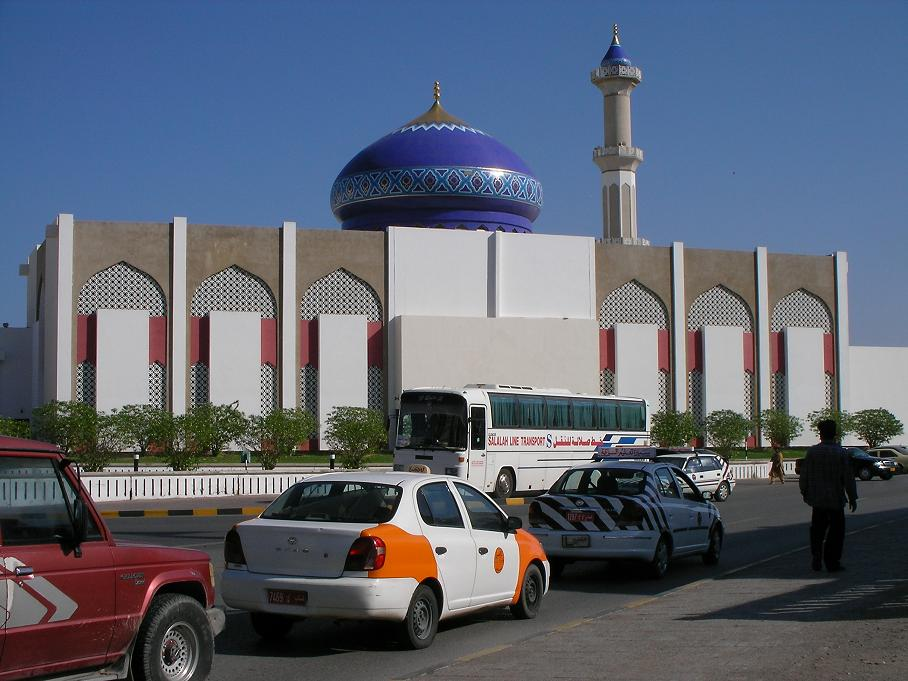
Mosque in Ruwi

Ruwi (Arabic: روي) is a commercial hub and the main business area of Muscat, the capital of Oman. Attractions in Ruwi include a variety of multi-confessional religious buildings, a National Museum, a clock tower, and a park. The population of Ruwi is 85,601.

The southeastern portion of the district has been dubbed as "Little Pakistan" and "Little India" due to a huge number of South Asians from either country residing there.

== History ==
Ruwi was initially a small fishing village with only a few houses, located near the bay. During the reign of Sultan Said bin Sultan Al-Busaidi, it grew into a town with several shops, a police station, and a few homes.

In the late 19th century, the first road was built in the region, connecting Muscat to Al Bustan and connecting the small village of Ruwi to the rest of Oman. With the construction of the road, the village of Ruwi began to grow and develop rapidly. It became the commercial and economic center of Muscat, attracting merchants and traders from different regions of the country.

During the 20th century, Ruwi continued to develop, and several modern amenities were added to the neighborhood. The first bank in Oman, Oman Bank, was opened in Ruwi in the 1970s. It was followed by the establishment of several other banks, including the Central Bank of Oman, which also has its headquarters in Ruwi.

== Transportation ==
Ruwi is the main transport hub of the local city bus service, Mwasalat. Buses on national and international routes leave from here.

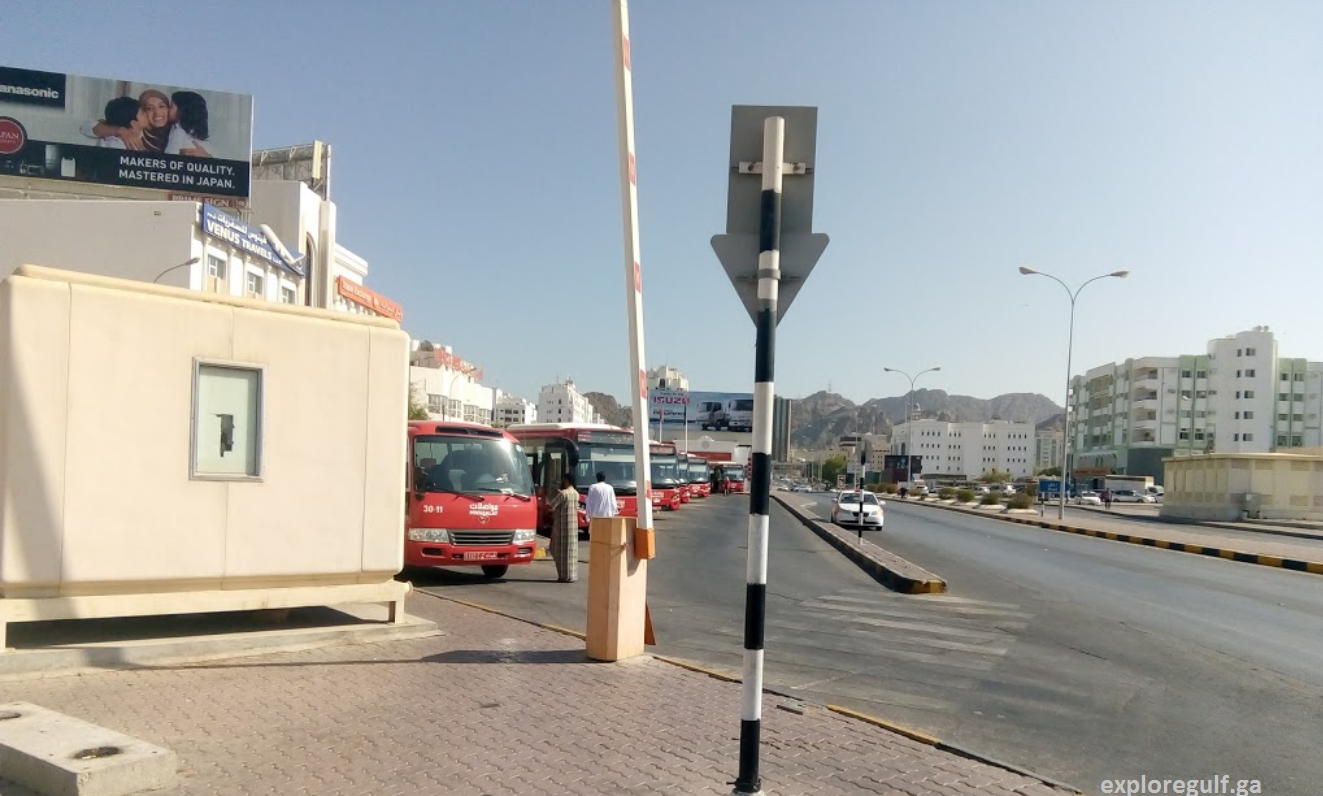
Ruwi Bus station

== Restaurants ==
There are a large number of Pakistani restaurants in Ruwi that serve many types of Pakistani food, including Peshwari Chapli kabab, Peshwari grill, and different types of Pakistani kabab. Pakistani Tea House is a well-known Pakistani restaurant and serves Pakistani baryani (Halal).

== Airport in Ruwi ==
Bait Al Falaj Airport was the first airport in Oman, fitted with limited equipment and facilities to serve as a civilian airport. It had a Communication Centre, a Customs Office, asphalt parking for aircraft and a maintenance shed. With these modest facilities, the airport was able to play a small part in the advancement of civil aviation in Oman. Bait Al Falaj Airport, dating back to 1929, was nothing but a dirt track landing strip, mainly put to use for military purposes. It was additionally being utilized by the Petroleum Development Oman Company for its aircraft, flying between Muscat and oil exploration fields in Fahud, Qarn Al Alam and other locations.

Today, the site of the airfield is now the centre of modern commercial and residential buildings in Ruwi.

== Commercials in Ruwi ==
Ruwi high street is the main commercial street in Oman and has numerous jewelry shops, electrical shops, gift shops etc. Both bigger shopping complexes and smaller retail shops are located in Ruwi.

== Cinemas ==
Star Cinema and City Cinema are the most popular cinemas of Muscat situated in Ruwi.

== Religious places in Ruwi ==
Sultan Qaboos Mosque is one of the biggest mosques in Ruwi located next to the Ruwi Bus station. A number of churches and Hindu temples are located in the multi-denominational compound in Ruwi.
