= Wutayyah =

- Village
- Location in Oman
- Coordinates: 23°36′N 58°30′E
- Country: Oman
- Governorate: Muscat Governorate
- Time zone: UTC+4 (Oman Standard Time)

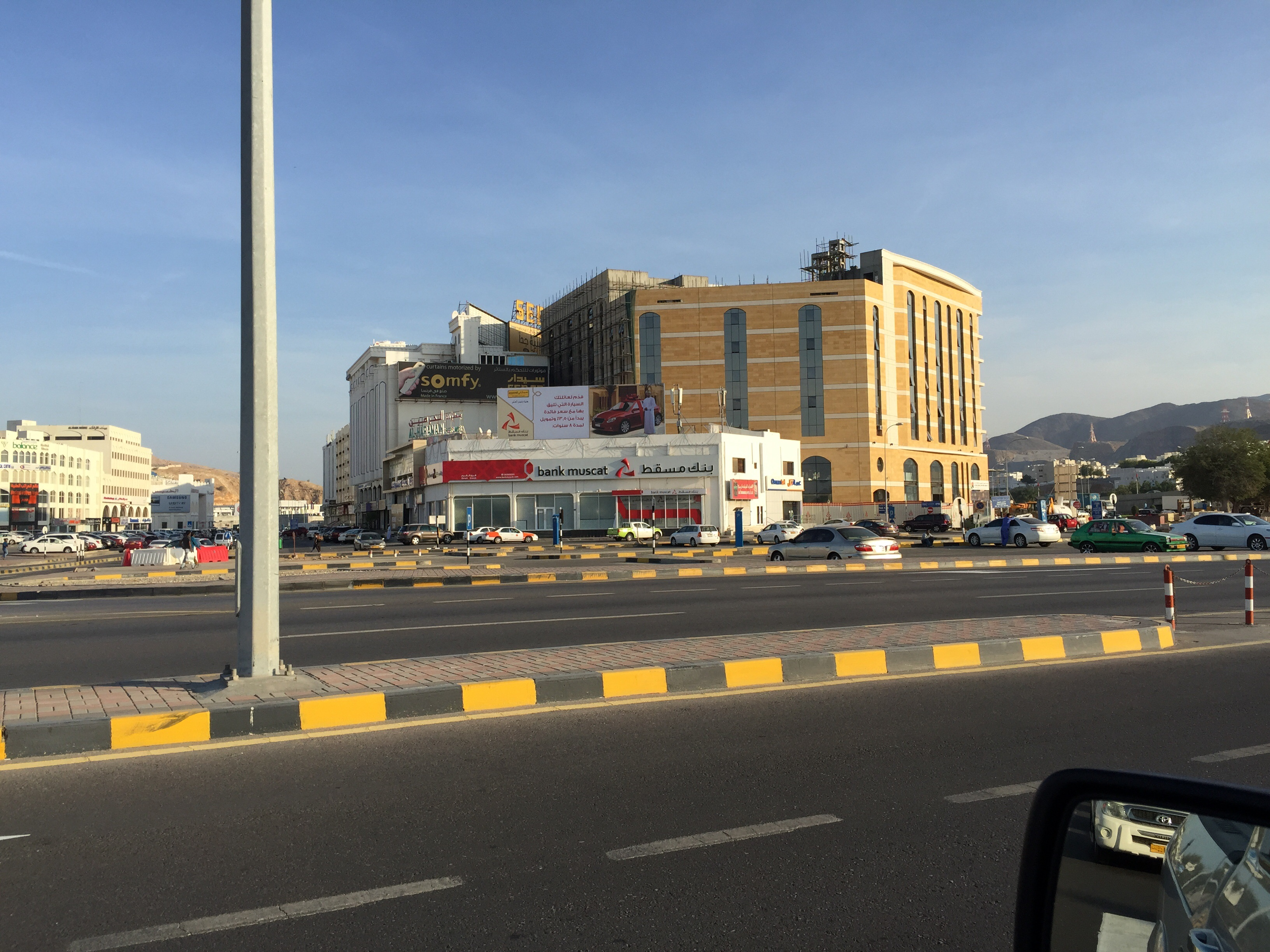
Al Wutayyah, Muscat, Oman

Wutayyah (Arabic: الوطية) is a village in Muscat, in northeastern Oman.
