= Human trafficking in Oman =

Oman ratified the 2000 UN TIP Protocol in May 2005.

In 2010, Oman was a destination and transit country for men and women, primarily from India, Pakistan, Bangladesh, Sri Lanka, the Philippines, and Indonesia, some of whom were subjected to trafficking in persons, specifically conditions indicative of forced labor. Most of these South and Southeast Asian migrants traveled willingly to Oman with the expectation of employment in domestic service or as low-skilled workers in the country's construction, agriculture, or service sectors. Some of them subsequently faced conditions indicative of forced labor, such as the withholding of passports and other restrictions on movement, non-payment of wages, long working hours without food or rest, threats, and physical or sexual abuse. Labor recruitment agencies and their sub-agents in migrants' original communities in South Asia, as well as labor brokers in the United Arab Emirates (UAE), Oman, and Iran, may deceive workers into accepting work that in some instances constitutes forced labor. Many of these agencies provided false contracts for employment either with fictitious employers or at fictitious wages, charged workers high recruitment fees (often exceeding $1,000) at high rates of interest, and urge workers to enter Oman on tourist visas. Oman was also a destination and transit country for women from China, India, Morocco, Eastern Europe, and South Asia who may be forced into commercial sexual exploitation, generally by nationals of their own countries. Male Pakistani laborers, and others from India, Bangladesh, Sri Lanka, and East Asia, transited Oman en route to the UAE; some of these migrant workers were exploited in situations of forced labor upon reaching their destination.

In 2010, the Government of Oman did not fully comply with the minimum standards for the elimination of trafficking; however, it is making significant efforts to do so. The government's prosecution and conviction of trafficking offenders under its anti-trafficking legislation demonstrated an increased commitment to combating trafficking during the reporting period. Omani authorities continued to lack comprehensive procedures to proactively identify trafficking victims among undocumented migrants and women in prostitution.

The U.S. State Department's Office to Monitor and Combat Trafficking in Persons placed the country in "Tier 2 Watchlist" in 2017. The country was placed at Tier 2 in 2023.

In 2023, the Organised Crime Index gave the country a score of 7 out of 10 for human trafficking.

== Prosecution (2010) ==
The Omani Government made clear progress in its law enforcement efforts against sex trafficking over the last year. Royal Decree No. 126/2008, the Law Combating Human Trafficking, prohibits all forms of trafficking and prescribes punishments of three to 15 years' imprisonment, in addition to financial penalties. These punishments are sufficiently stringent and commensurate with penalties prescribed for other serious crimes. A legally enforceable circular prohibits employers' withholding of migrant workers' passports, a practice contributing to forced labor; the circular, however, does not specify penalties for noncompliance, and this practice continues to be widespread.

The Government of Oman indicted nine Omanis and 13 foreigners for trafficking in seven cases during the reporting period. Oman convicted one Omani for labor trafficking and another Omani for involuntary manslaughter after forcing an expatriate to work on a fishing vessel. The victim was pushed from the boat, hit his head, and drowned; the case was awaiting final sentencing. The remaining six cases involved trafficking for sexual exploitation; two of these cases were still in progress. Of the four cases completed, nine people were convicted of trafficking and given sentences ranging from two years' imprisonment, to seven years' imprisonment with a fine of $26,000. Five people were convicted of trafficking related crimes, and one person was acquitted for lack of evidence.

In February 2010, the Royal Oman Police conducted a week-long seminar for police, public prosecutors, and judges led by a counter-trafficking expert. The seminar promoted awareness on trafficking and included sessions on victim identification. The Police Academy, public prosecution training center, and police officers' institute trained government officials on human trafficking; this training was incorporated into the initial police training curriculum.

== Protection (2010) ==
The Government of Oman made some progress protecting victims of human trafficking. Overall, the government continued to lack formal procedures to proactively identify victims of trafficking among all vulnerable groups, including migrants detained for immigration violations and women in prostitution. Omani authorities made some efforts, however, to identify victims among particular groups. For example, Ministry of Manpower (MOM) representatives interviewed all employees who ran away from sponsors to determine if they experienced a labor violation, and the MOM had a mechanism in place to identify trafficking victims as part of inspections of private companies. Immigration officials also interviewed all migrant workers leaving Oman to determine if there were outstanding labor complaints. However, it is unknown how many victims were identified using these methods.

The government placed identified trafficking victims into government-run shelter facilities. The country continued to lack permanent shelter facilities to provide protection services to both labor and sex trafficking victims.

However, during the reporting period, the government provided shelter, legal and medical assistance, and psychological care to 21 identified sex trafficking victims at a small shelter in Muscat, and rented villas in other areas of Oman. The government encourages potential trafficking victims to assist in the investigation and prosecution of crimes against them. Due to a lack of comprehensive victim identification procedures, Oman may not have ensured expatriates subjected to forced labor and prostitution were not inappropriately incarcerated, fined, or otherwise penalized for unlawful acts committed as a direct result of being trafficked. Government officials indicated the government paid for airfare and spending money for the victims to return home if they wished at the completion of legal procedures. One hundred and sixty MOM labor inspectors received ILO training on victim identification during inspections of private companies.

== Prevention (2010) ==
The government made some progress in preventing human trafficking. Oman published amendments via Royal Decree 63/2009 to Omani Labor Law 35/2003 in November 2009. While the amendments are meant to combat illegal "free" visas which may contribute to human trafficking, they did not loosen the restrictions on expatriate workers working for anyone other than their sponsor. The amendments also provided further protections to employees who are unfairly terminated.

In 2009, MOM's labor inspectorate inspected 2,226 business establishments representing 36 percent of expatriate workers in Oman. Education on human trafficking took place at 41 percent of the visited sites. Oman continued to distribute brochures in multiple languages highlighting the rights and services to which workers are legally entitled to source country embassies and to new migrant laborers at airports, recruitment agencies, and in their places of work. Other brochures in multiple languages were distributed, summarizing the trafficking law and providing detailed information on how to report a trafficking crime and the types of assistance available to victims. The National Committee to Combat Human Trafficking (NCCHT) met regularly during the reporting period. In October 2009, the NCCHT launched a website, which received over 25,000 visits a month, and provided information on pertinent legislation, tools for identifying trafficking victims, and a method for reporting trafficking cases to the relevant authorities. The NCCHT also launched a trafficking-specific hotline; it received ten calls, primarily related to labor law violations. It also published Oman's National Plan to Combat Human Trafficking. The government continued its public awareness campaign, which included placement of at least one article or editorial each week in the press about trafficking, press interviews on trafficking, and six hours of radio and two hours of TV on national stations addressing trafficking issues. In April 2010, Oman released its first anti-human trafficking report, which included details on prosecutions, victim care, prevention efforts, and public awareness efforts. The government recently issued a decision to gender segregate massage facilities not associated with hotels; such standalone businesses are often a front for prostitution.

Twelve senior officials from the Government of Oman attended a two-day anti-trafficking workshop led by the ILO in October 2009. In April 2010, the Ministry of Social Development (MoSD) conducted training, in conjunction with UNSAFE, on preventing child trafficking. MoSD also worked with the Oman Women's Associations to conduct lectures for Omani women on the human trafficking law, with an emphasis on domestic servants. Two members of the NCCHT attended the UNODC conference in Geneva and also attended a conference on trafficking held in Qatar.

== See also ==
- Human rights in Oman
- Prostitution in Oman
- Slavery in Oman
