= Khalfan al-Badwawi =

Omani human rights activist and blogger

- خلفان البدواوي (Arabic)
- Education: Oman Nursing Institute; Cairo University; SOAS University of London
- Occupations: Blogger, human rights activist
- Known for: Activism during the 2011–2012 Omani protests; 2013 detention

Khalfan al-Badwawi (Arabic: خلفان البدواوي; born in Muscat) is an Omani human rights activist. He became a prominent figure in the 2011–2012 Omani pro-democracy movement, advocating for political reform, anti-corruption measures, and freedom of speech. He is known for his multiple detentions by Omani security forces, allegations of psychological torture, and his subsequent exile to the United Kingdom, where he was granted political asylum based on the risk of persecution in Oman.

== Personal life ==
Al-Badwawi was born in Muscat, Oman, to a middle-class family. His father previously worked in Kuwait, where he was exposed to pan-Arab political movements before returning to Oman.

=== Education and career ===
He graduated with a diploma in General Nursing from the Oman Nursing Institute in 2003. He subsequently worked for the Ministry of Health as an intensive care nurse at the Royal Hospital in Muscat until 2006. He later transitioned to the private sector, working as a paramedic and health and safety officer in Oman's oil fields, and as an occupational health nurse for Sohar Aluminium starting in 2008.

In 2010, al-Badwawi began studying law via distance learning at Cairo University. Following his exile to the United Kingdom, he pursued further studies in history at SOAS University of London, where his research has focused on the history of slavery and race in Oman.

=== Family ===
Al-Badwawi married in 2007 and has a son and a daughter. His family remained in Oman following his flight into exile in 2014.

== Activism and 2011–2012 protests ==
Following the regional Arab Spring, protests erupted in Oman in early 2011. Citizens demanded economic reforms, an end to corruption, and greater legislative powers for the Consultative Assembly of Oman. Al-Badwawi participated in these protests and used social media platforms, particularly Facebook and Twitter, to document civil unrest and criticize government corruption.

In June 2012, amidst a crackdown on dissent, al-Badwawi was fired from his job at Sohar Aluminium due to his political activities. Later that month, he was arrested alongside dozens of other activists, writers, and bloggers. According to Amnesty International, the arrests were part of a coordinated effort to silence critics of the government and Sultan Qaboos bin Said.

On 16 September 2012, a court in Muscat sentenced al-Badwawi and several other activists to jail terms. He was sentenced to one year in prison and fined 200 Omani riyals (approx. $520 USD) on charges of "insulting the Sultan" (lèse-majesté) and "violating the Information Technology Law" through his online writings. He was released in March 2013 while his case was pending appeal.

Al-Badwawi alleged that during his detention he was subjected to psychological torture aimed at disorientation and sensory deprivation. He reported being confined to a windowless cell where he endured extreme variations in temperature, constant bright lights to prevent sleep, and "relentless pro-Sultan anthems blaring from a speaker in the ceiling." His allegations were later cited by the Gulf Centre for Human Rights in reports documenting the systematic use of torture in Oman.

== 2013 detention and torture allegations ==
In March 2013, al-Badwawi attempted to organize a peaceful protest via Facebook against a state visit by Prince Charles (then Prince of Wales) to Oman. The visit was intended to promote British diplomatic and commercial interests, specifically regarding arms deals with BAE Systems.

Shortly before the planned protest, al-Badwawi was intercepted by Omani special forces in a "high-speed manoeuvre" while driving his car. He was subsequently held in solitary confinement for five days at a secret facility run by the Internal Security Service (ISS). Al-Badwawi was released only after Prince Charles had left the country.

== Exile in the United Kingdom ==
Facing continued harassment and the threat of re-arrest, al-Badwawi fled Oman in 2013. He sought asylum in the United Kingdom, where an immigration judge granted his claim, ruling that he "would be at real risk on return to Oman because of his political opinion."

=== Campaigning and GCHQ claims ===
Since his exile, al-Badwawi has continued to campaign for human rights in Oman and has been a vocal critic of the United Kingdom's support for the Omani government. He has frequently spoken at events in London, criticizing British foreign policy and the export of surveillance technology to Gulf states.

Al-Badwawi has specifically targeted the relationship between the British intelligence agency GCHQ and the Omani security services. Following the Edward Snowden leaks in 2014, which revealed the existence of three secret GCHQ surveillance bases in Oman (including sites codenamed "CLARINET" and "TIMPANI"), al-Badwawi suspected that British intelligence may have facilitated his interception in 2013.

In 2020, he filed a subject access request to GCHQ to determine if the agency held data on him or had shared intelligence with Omani authorities leading to his detention. GCHQ refused to confirm or deny the existence of any personal data, citing national security exemptions.

== See also ==
- Human rights in Oman
- 2011 Omani protests
- UK–Oman relations
- Internet censorship in Oman
