= Mazin Bin Ghadoubah Mosque =

Oldest mosque in Oman

Mazin Bin Ghadoubah Mosque Masjid Al-Miḍmār
- مَسْجِد مَازِن بِن غَضُوْبَة مَسْجِد ٱلْمِضْمَار
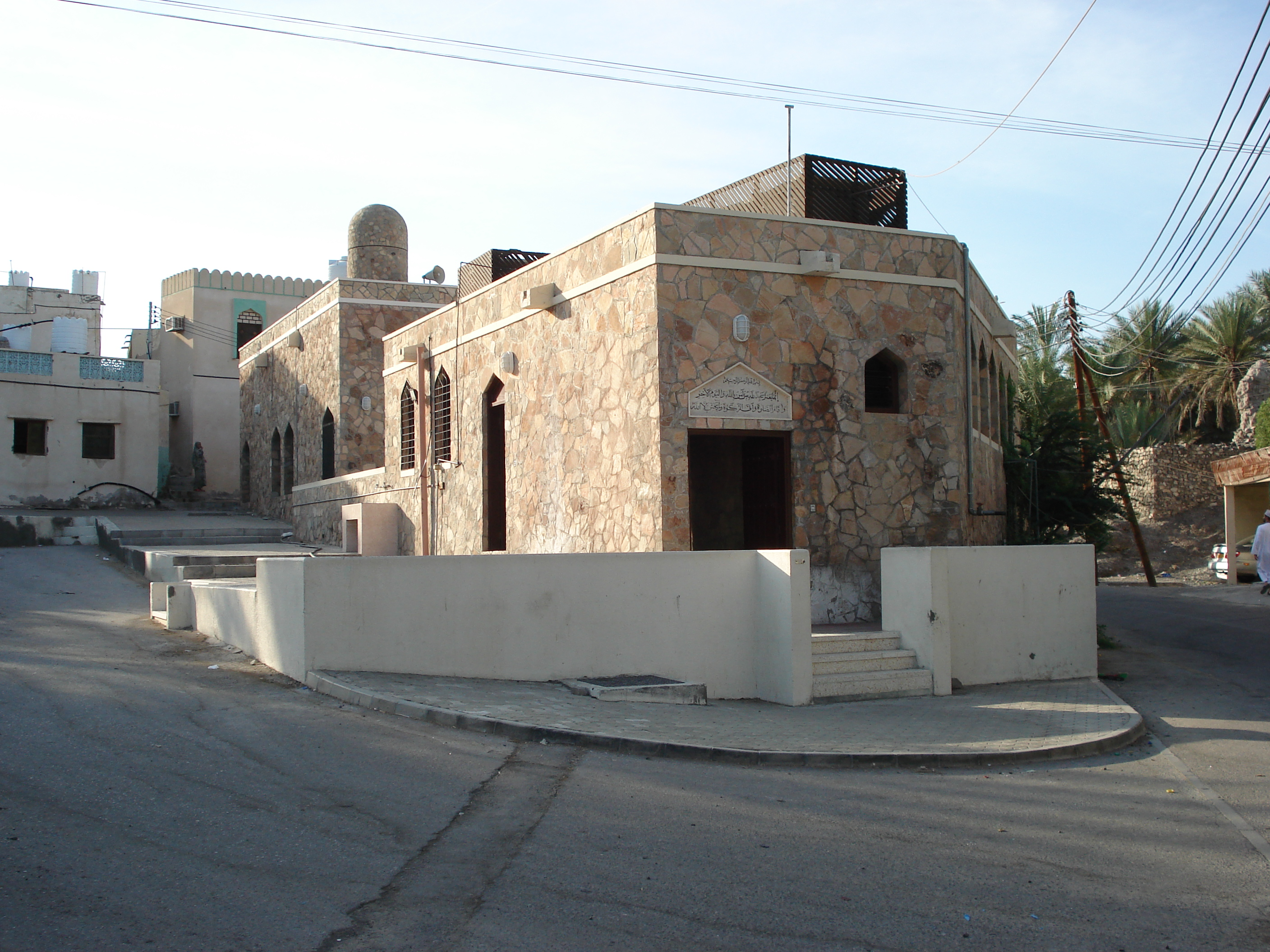
- The mosque in 2006

- Location of the mosque in Oman Mazin Bin Ghadoubah Mosque (Middle East) Mazin Bin Ghadoubah Mosque (West and Central Asia)

Religion
- Affiliation: Islam
- Ecclesiastical or organizational status: Mosque
- Status: Active

Location
- Location: Samail, Muscat, Ad Dakhiliyah Governorate
- Country: Oman
- Interactive map of Mazin Bin Ghadoubah Mosque; Masjid Al-Miḍmār
- Coordinates: 23°18′41″N 58°00′38.23″E

Architecture
- Founder: Mazin bin Ghadouba
- Completed: c. 627 C.E.
- Materials: Stone and marble

The Mazin Bin Ghadoubah Mosque (Arabic: مَسْجِد مَازِن بِن غَضُوْبَة, romanized: Masjid Māzin Bin Ġaḍūbah), also known as Masjid Al-Miḍmār (Arabic: مَسْجِد ٱلْمِضْمَار), is a mosque located in Samail, Ad Dakhiliyah Governorate, Sultanate of Oman. Founded by Māzin bin Al-Ghaḍūbah the Omani companion of the Islamic prophet Muhammad, and completed in c. 627 C.E., it is the oldest mosque in the country. Built in stone and marble, the mosque was restored and renovated in 1979 and in 2017.

== See also ==
- Islam in Oman
  - List of mosques in Oman
- List of oldest mosques on the Arabian Peninsula
