= Samail =

Settlement and valley in Oman

Samail Samāʾil (سَمَائِل)
- Wilayah
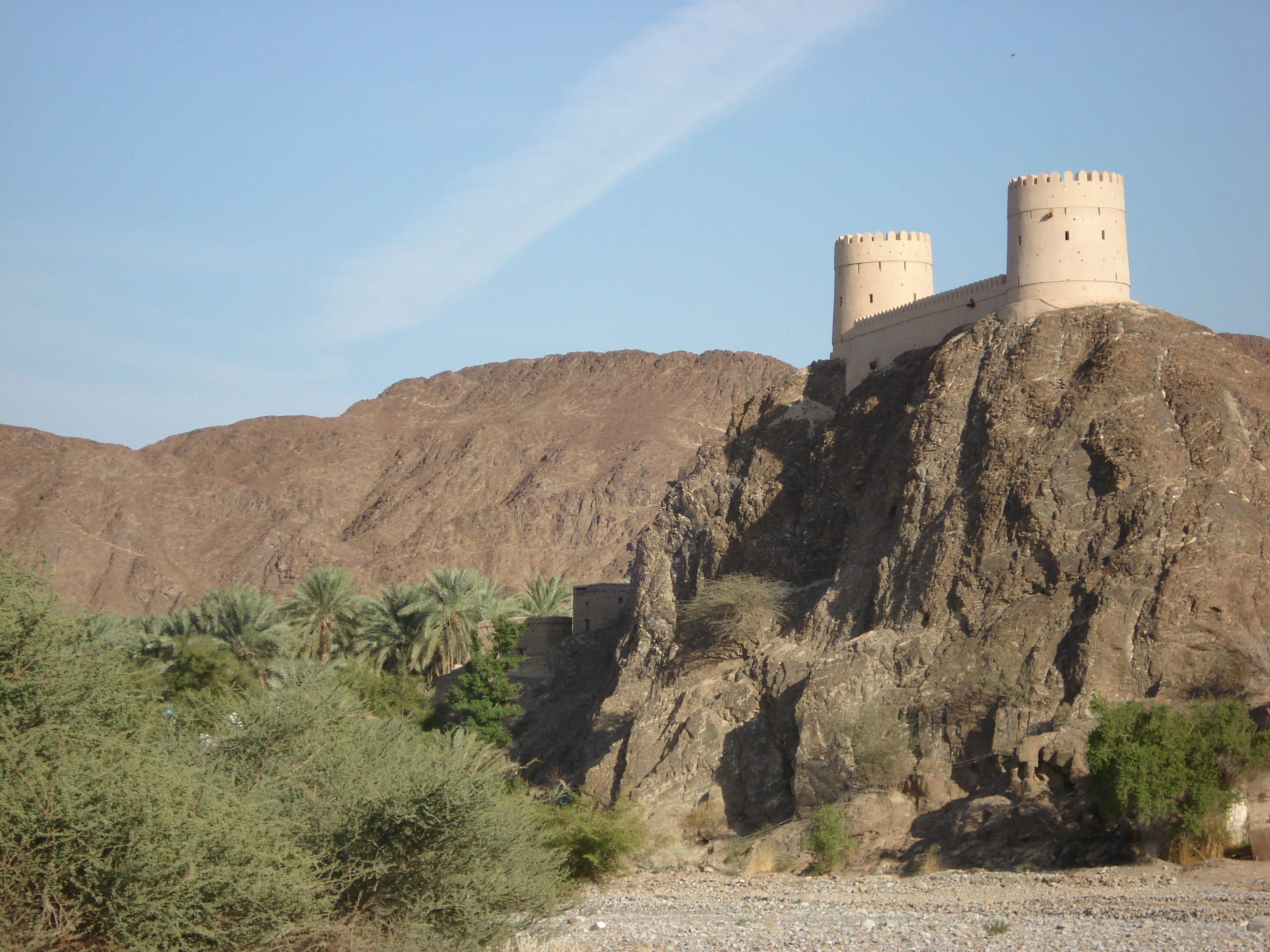
- A fort in Samail

- Location in Oman Samail (Middle East) Samail (West and Central Asia)
- Coordinates: 23°18′N 57°59′E
- Country: Oman
- Governorate: Ad Dakhiliyah

Population (2020)
  - Total: 80,538
- Time zone: UTC+4 (+4)

Samāʾil (Arabic: سَمَائِل) is a Wilayah (Province) located in Muscat Region of the Sultanate of Oman. It is surrounded by a range of towering mountains, and its valley, Wadi Samail, is approximately 50 kilometres (31 miles) from the capital Muscat. The population is around 40,000, spread across 55 villages and towns.

== Geography ==
Samail is distinguished by its significant geographical location, as it serves as the main gateway between the governorates and regions overlooking the Gulf of Oman and the interior areas facing the desert and southern plains.

Its regional boundaries are bordered by the wilayat of Bidbid to the north, Izki to the south, Al-Mudhaibi to the east, and Nakhil and Al Jabal Al Akhdar to the west. Moreover, it holds crucial geographic characteristics, notably being a transitional zone between the Western Al Hajar Mountains and the Eastern Al Hajar Mountains. Wadi Samail separates these two mountain chains from each other.

=== Wadi ===
The wadi (valley) of Sama'il, also referred to as the "Sumail Gap", divides Al-Hajar Mountains into the Eastern and Western subranges. A route from the coast to the country's interior traverses the valley. The gap extends about 60 km (37 miles) from the coast and Muscat Airport on one hand to Sama'il on the other. The route ends at Izki, and acts as the main road from Muscat to Nizwa. The highest point in the gap is more than 2,000 ft (610 m) above sea level.

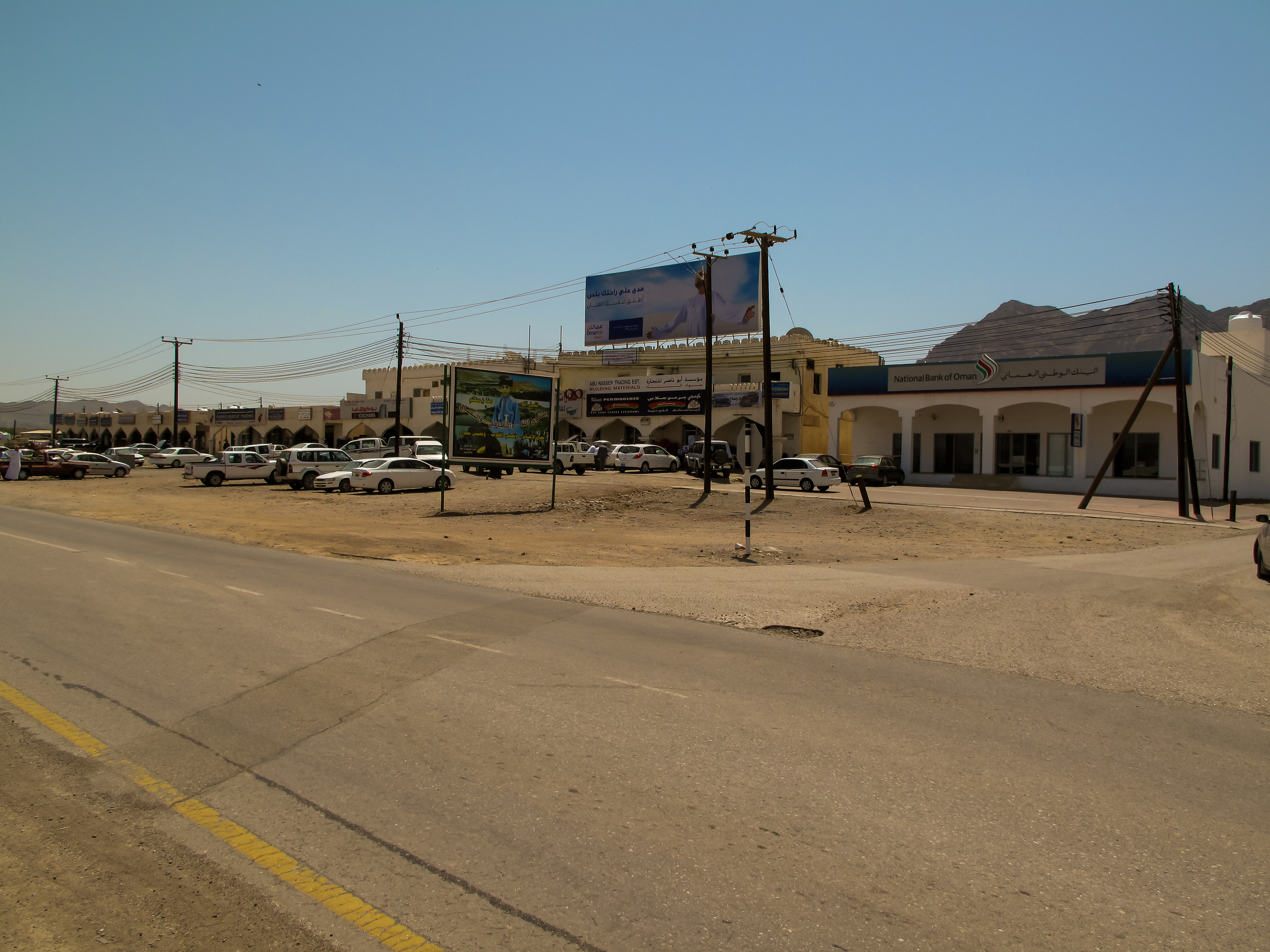
The road to Nizwa

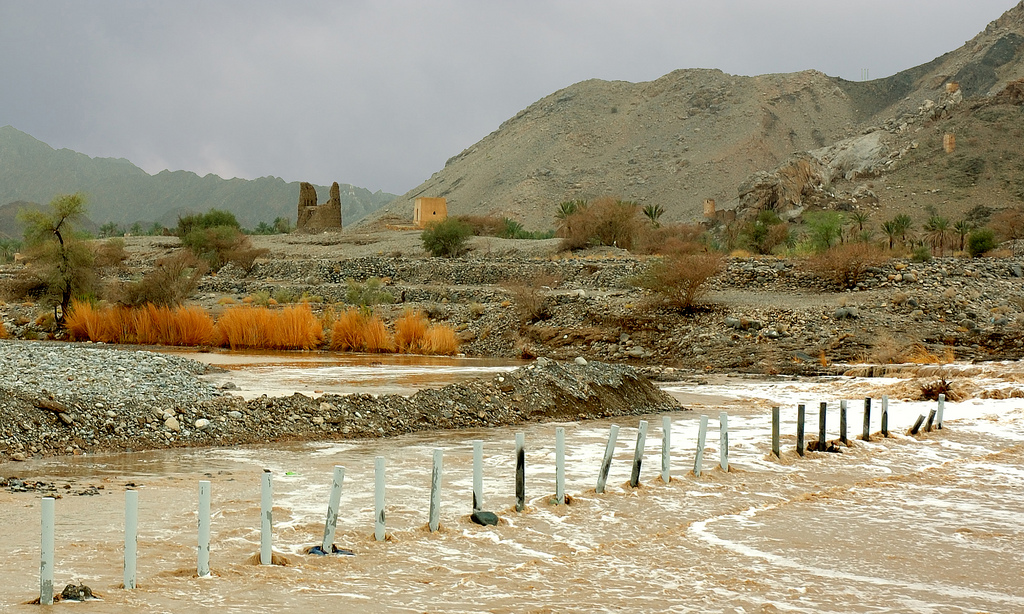
A wadi in Samail after rainfall

== History ==
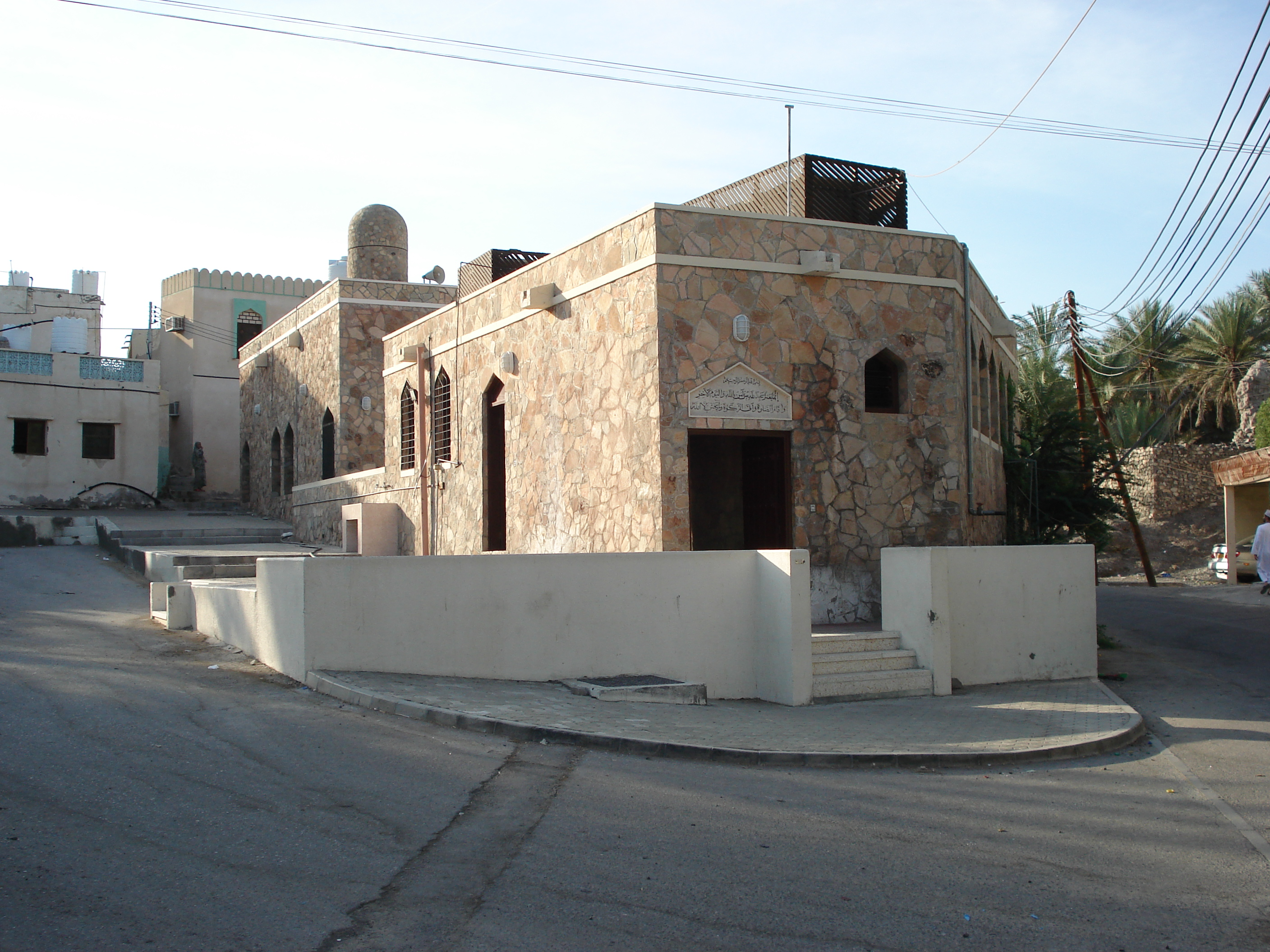
Masjid Mazin bin Al-Ghadoubah, Oman's oldest mosque.

Samail is historically renowned as the first Arab land to embrace Islam. Māzin bin Al-Ghaḍūbah was the first Omani to become a Muslim during the lifetime of the Islamic Prophet Muhammad. In c. 627 CE, he founded a mosque, known as the Mazin Bin Ghadoubah Mosque, which is considered to be the oldest mosque in the country. Masjid Māzin is also known as Masjid Al-Midhmar, and holds historical significance as a place where prayers are answered. Among Samail's archaeological landmarks are approximately 300 mosques, the most important being the Mazin bin Gadoobah mosque, the mosque of the two Qiblas (Masjid Al-Qiblatayn), and the "Al-Fajj Mosque."

Historically, the route along the Sumail Gap was used for trade and communication between coastal and interior areas of Oman. Caravans used this route for trading in frankincense, and its explorers include Marco Polo and Ibn Battutah.

Samail is also considered the homeland of many prominent Imams, scholars, and jurists who played a significant role in building Islamic civilization and serving the noble creed throughout the ages. It is distinguished by its ancient fortress, which nobody knows the builder of, except that the last person to renovate it was Imam Nasser bin Marshid Al Ya'arubi.

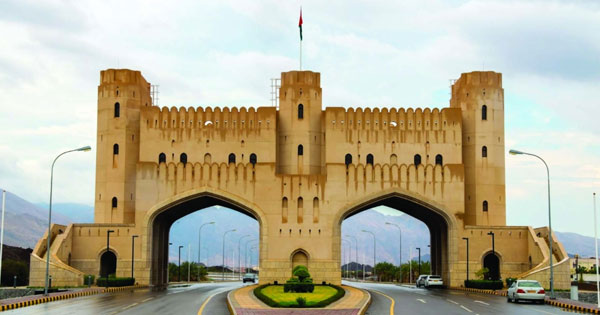
Gate of Samail

The town boasts around 115 castles, fortresses, and towers, with the most significant being the Samail Fortress situated in one of the mountain heights in the city's center. Its castle is distinctive, and its tower is known as "Borj Ad-Dawa."

Samail is also characterized by numerous tourist attractions, such as terraces, springs, and lush oases, with around 194 aflaj (irrigation channels). The most famous of these aflaj is "Al-Sumadi." Samail is renowned as "Samail Al-Fihha" due to its abundance of green oases, orchards, and the adjacent trees.

=== Fortress ===
The fortress is located in the highlands of Samail, known as "Upper Samail," and stretches across the isolated eastern façade of an isolated rock. Its width is approximately 80 metres (260 feet) in the lower part. The fortress consists of a large circular tower built with stones and gypsum. At the highest point on the rock, there is a square tower on the northern side. High irregular walls surround the fortress, extending between the fortress and the front stronghold, which houses the main entrance to the fortress. The front stronghold includes the residence of the governor, a two-story building, and another house for the military commander.

On the sides of the entrance, there are guard posts located on the western side of the fortress. Inside the fortress, there are buildings for protection, some of which are constructed adjacent to the walls. The fortress contains a small mosque, a prison, and storage areas for weapons and wood. According to historical accounts after a visit to the fortress at the end of the 19th century (AH 13th Islamic century), it was noted that there were eight iron cannons. However, currently, there are six cannons, one of which is bronze with an embellished barrel.

The building at the summit is an artillery tower with a diameter of 11 metres (36 feet) and an approximate height of 7 metres (23 feet). The elevated ground floor has a diameter of about 7.4 m (24 ft). Access to the tower is through stairs leading to a small door on the eastern side. The walls are 1.7 meters thick, reinforced from both the northern and southern sides with foundations, each measuring 1.5 m (4.9 ft) in length and 80 centimetres (31 inches) in width, extending to the upper ground. The height of this chamber is 3.7 m (12 ft) to the lower side of the beams supporting the roof, made of palm trunks. The cannon openings have a width of 1.3 metres (4.3 feet), which reduces to 80–65 centimetres (31–26 inches) inside.

The walls have small openings, possibly used for shooting arrows, and there are also openings at ground level, only revealing the upper part of some of them, indicating that the floor was elevated. The rooftop is accessible through stairs cut into a palm trunk through an opening in the roof, also made of palm trunks. The outer wall thickness here decreases to one meter, and the diameter of the rooftop building becomes 8.6 metres (28 feet). The top of the wall on the northern side widens, forming an observation platform.

To the east of the tower's entrance, there is a cave hewn into the rock, measuring 4.7 m (15 ft) in length, 2.3 metres (7.5 feet) in width, and 3 m (9.8 ft) in depth. It has a dual stair entrance facing the tower. It is believed that the cave served as a water storage facility, with signs of plastering, and it might have been used as a prison for punishing criminals.

=== Development ===
The wilaya of Samail experienced a period of prosperity and development during the reign of Sultan Qaboos. Significant progress was made in the field of education, with the wilaya now comprising over 20 schools covering all educational levels. The healthcare sector also witnessed substantial advancements, with the establishment of the specialized Samail Hospital and the presence of various comprehensive health centers throughout the wilaya.

Furthermore, Samail flourished in several other domains, including the expansion of its road network and the improvement of electricity, water, and sanitation services. The wilaya embraced modernization and development, making remarkable strides in various aspects of its infrastructure and public services, which contributed to enhancing the quality of life for its citizens during this era of renaissance under the visionary leadership of Sultan Qaboos.

== Vicinity ==
Al-Madrah village is considered the commercial center of the governorate. Below are some regions in Wilayat Samail:

1. Al Rafi'ah: Located to the southeast of the wilaya.
2. Al Qurayn: Situated to the south of the wilaya and southwest of Al Rafi'ah.
3. As-Saltiyah: Found to the south of the wilaya and southwest of Al Qurayn.
4. Al Faghrah: Positioned to the south of the wilaya and west of As-Saltiyah.
5. Lizugh: Located to the east of the wilaya.
6. Al Hubb: Situated to the northwest of the wilaya.
7. Al Azim: Found to the south of both the wilaya and Al Faghrah.
8. Al Afiyah: Positioned to the south of the wilaya.
9. Al Khoobar: Located to the east of the wilaya.

== Climate ==
The climate of the wilaya is influenced by the semi-arid climate of the Arabian Peninsula, characterized by dryness and high temperatures in the summer and occasional rainfall resulting from winter air depressions. However, its geographical location has played a significant role in determining its climate. Being close to the Tropic of Cancer has contributed to moderating the winter cold, while its location along the Batinah Plain and the Gulf of Oman, along with the surrounding mountainous terrain, have contributed to the diversity of its climate and the variation in rainfall.

Climate data for Samail, elevation 417 m (1,368 ft), (1991–2020 normals, extremes 2003–2023)
Month	Jan	Feb	Mar	Apr	May	Jun	Jul	Aug	Sep	Oct	Nov	Dec	Year
Record high °C (°F)	34.2 (93.6)	37.1 (98.8)	40.4 (104.7)	42.3 (108.1)	48.2 (118.8)	47.8 (118.0)	47.6 (117.7)	46.8 (116.2)	44.5 (112.1)	41.9 (107.4)	36.8 (98.2)	33.3 (91.9)	48.2 (118.8)
Mean daily maximum °C (°F)	25.6 (78.1)	28.4 (83.1)	32.6 (90.7)	37.2 (99.0)	41.5 (106.7)	43.3 (109.9)	42.9 (109.2)	42.2 (108.0)	40.3 (104.5)	36.8 (98.2)	30.9 (87.6)	26.7 (80.1)	35.7 (96.3)
Daily mean °C (°F)	19.7 (67.5)	22.0 (71.6)	25.9 (78.6)	30.6 (87.1)	35.0 (95.0)	37.0 (98.6)	37.0 (98.6)	35.8 (96.4)	33.8 (92.8)	30.2 (86.4)	25.1 (77.2)	20.8 (69.4)	29.4 (84.9)
Mean daily minimum °C (°F)	14.5 (58.1)	16.6 (61.9)	19.9 (67.8)	24.4 (75.9)	28.7 (83.7)	30.9 (87.6)	31.5 (88.7)	30.4 (86.7)	28.2 (82.8)	24.3 (75.7)	19.9 (67.8)	15.6 (60.1)	23.7 (74.7)
Record low °C (°F)	8.3 (46.9)	8.2 (46.8)	10.0 (50.0)	17.6 (63.7)	21.6 (70.9)	25.5 (77.9)	26.2 (79.2)	25.6 (78.1)	22.0 (71.6)	19.0 (66.2)	13.1 (55.6)	8.0 (46.4)	8.0 (46.4)
Average precipitation mm (inches)	5.4 (0.21)	8.4 (0.33)	19.3 (0.76)	6.2 (0.24)	0.7 (0.03)	11.7 (0.46)	3.5 (0.14)	3.5 (0.14)	1.7 (0.07)	2.0 (0.08)	10.1 (0.40)	9.3 (0.37)	81.8 (3.23)
Average precipitation days (≥ 1.0 mm)	0.8	1.0	1.5	1.6	1.2	0.8	0.9	0.6	0.3	0.9	1.2	1.1	11.9
Source 1: World Meteorological Organization (precipitation 1998–2009)
Source 2: Starlings Roost Weather

== See also ==
- Middle East
  - Eastern Arabia
