= Prostitution in Oman =

Prostitution in Oman is illegal, but women from Eastern Europe, South Asia, North Africa, and China engage in prostitution in the country. Prostitution occurs in bars, hotels, nightclubs, brothels, massage parlors and health clubs.

Sex trafficking is a problem in Oman.

== Legal situation ==
Historically, prostitution was connected to slavery in Oman. The Islamic Law formally prohibited prostitution. However, since the principle of concubinage in Islam in Islamic Law allowed a man to have sexual intercourse with his female slave, prostitution in the Islamic world was commonly practiced by a pimp selling his female slave on the slave market to a client, who was then allowed to have sex with her as her new owner; the client would then cancel his purchase and return the slave to her pimp on the pretext of discontent, which was a legal and accepted method for prostitution in the Islamic world. Slavery in Oman was however abolished in 1970, after which this form of prostitution could no longer be practiced.

Only sex within a legalized marriage is permitted. Women's sex outside legal marriage is criminalised as zina (illegal sex, adultery, fornication). It is women, and not their clients, who are legally penalised for sex work which carries a jail sentence between three and five years. Living on the proceeds of prostitution is a crime, punishable by a fine and up to three months imprisonment (criminal code article 221). Additionally, any foreigner who commits an act against "public order or good morals" or who does not have a legal source of income may be deported (law 16 of 1995, articles 31[1] and 31[5]).

Police crackdowns are frequent. 43 women were arrested in raids in Bausher in December 2016 and over 100 in simultaneous raids in Al Khuwayr in August 2017.

Hundreds of Southeast Asian women have been arrested for prostitution, and in November 2016 the issuing of tourist visas to women from Southeast Asia was restricted.

In the 3 years prior to August 2017, 273 people were arrested for prostitution and all received a minimum of 3 years jail sentence.

== Sex trafficking ==
Oman is a destination and transit country for women, primarily from South and East Asia and East and North Africa, subjected to sex trafficking, often by nationals of their own countries. There have been anecdotal reports that female domestic workers from countries without a diplomatic presence in Oman are especially vulnerable to sex trafficking. Domestic workers who flee their employers are also vulnerable to forced prostitution.

During the 1990s and early 2000s, young women were trafficked from the former Soviet Union for sex work. In 2005 Oman ratified the International Labour Organization's 1959 convention prohibiting forced labour. By that time foreign migrant workers made up 60% of Oman's population, and their standard of living was lower than the Omani average (Oman is classified as "medium human development" by the United Nations Development Programme). Oman has a serious problem of people trafficking involving women and is considered a "Tier 2" country by the United States Department of State Office to Monitor and Combat Trafficking in Persons.
