= Slavery in Oman =

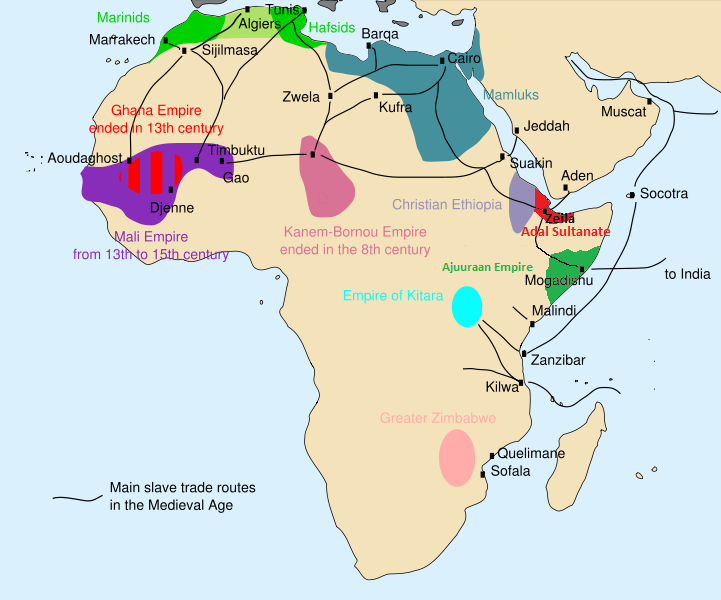
African slave trade in the Medieval Africa

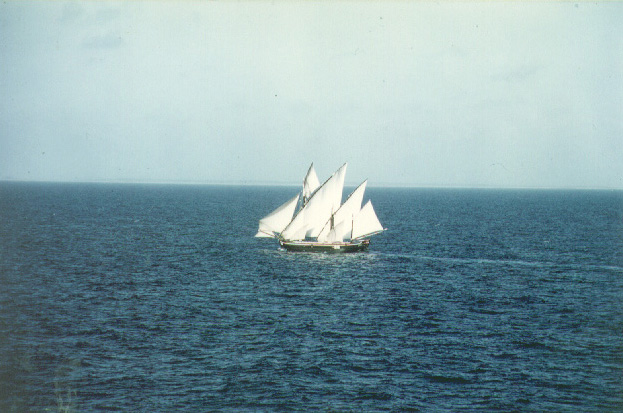
Dhows were used to transport goods and slaves to Oman.

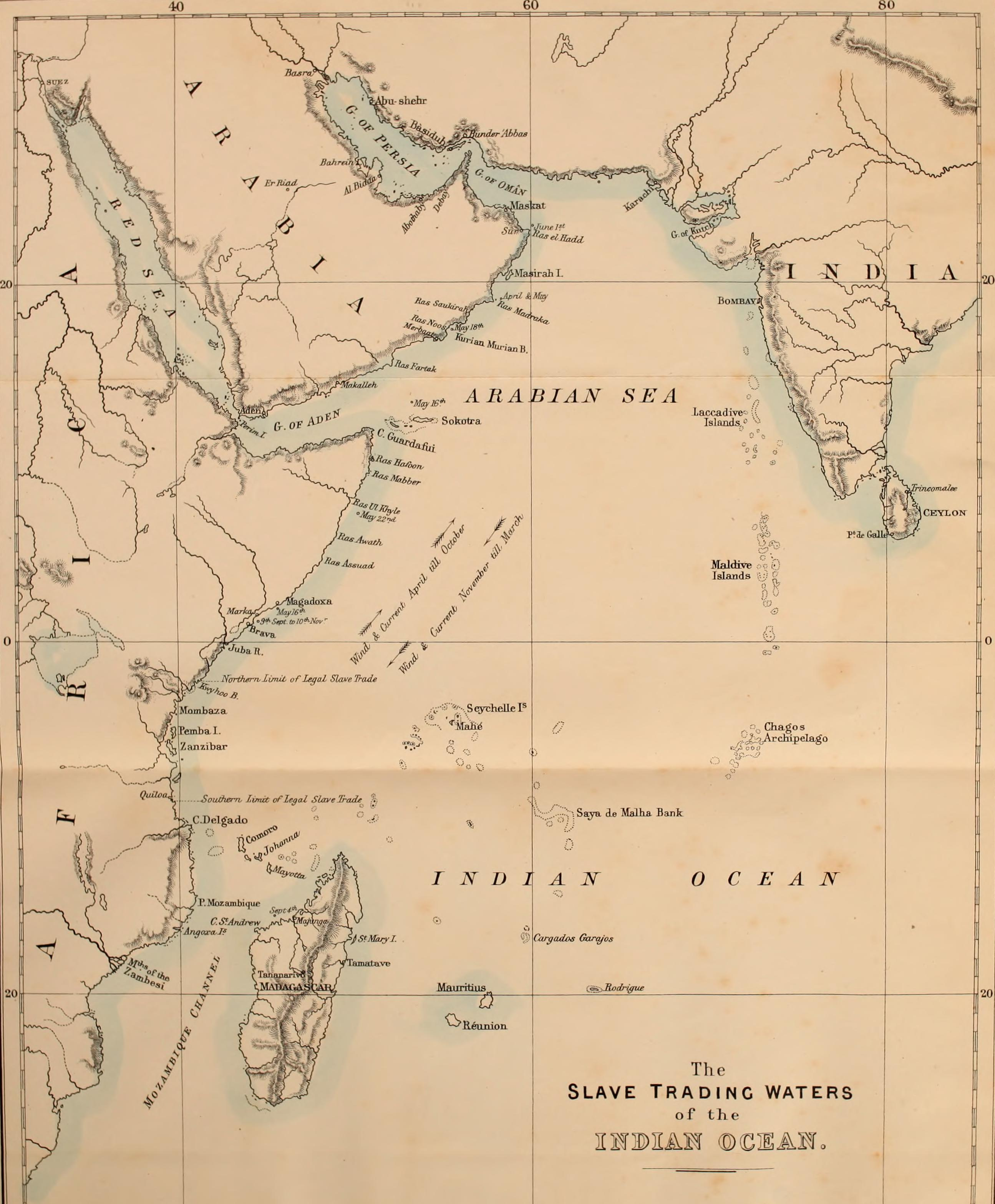
Slave-catching in the Indian Ocean, 1873

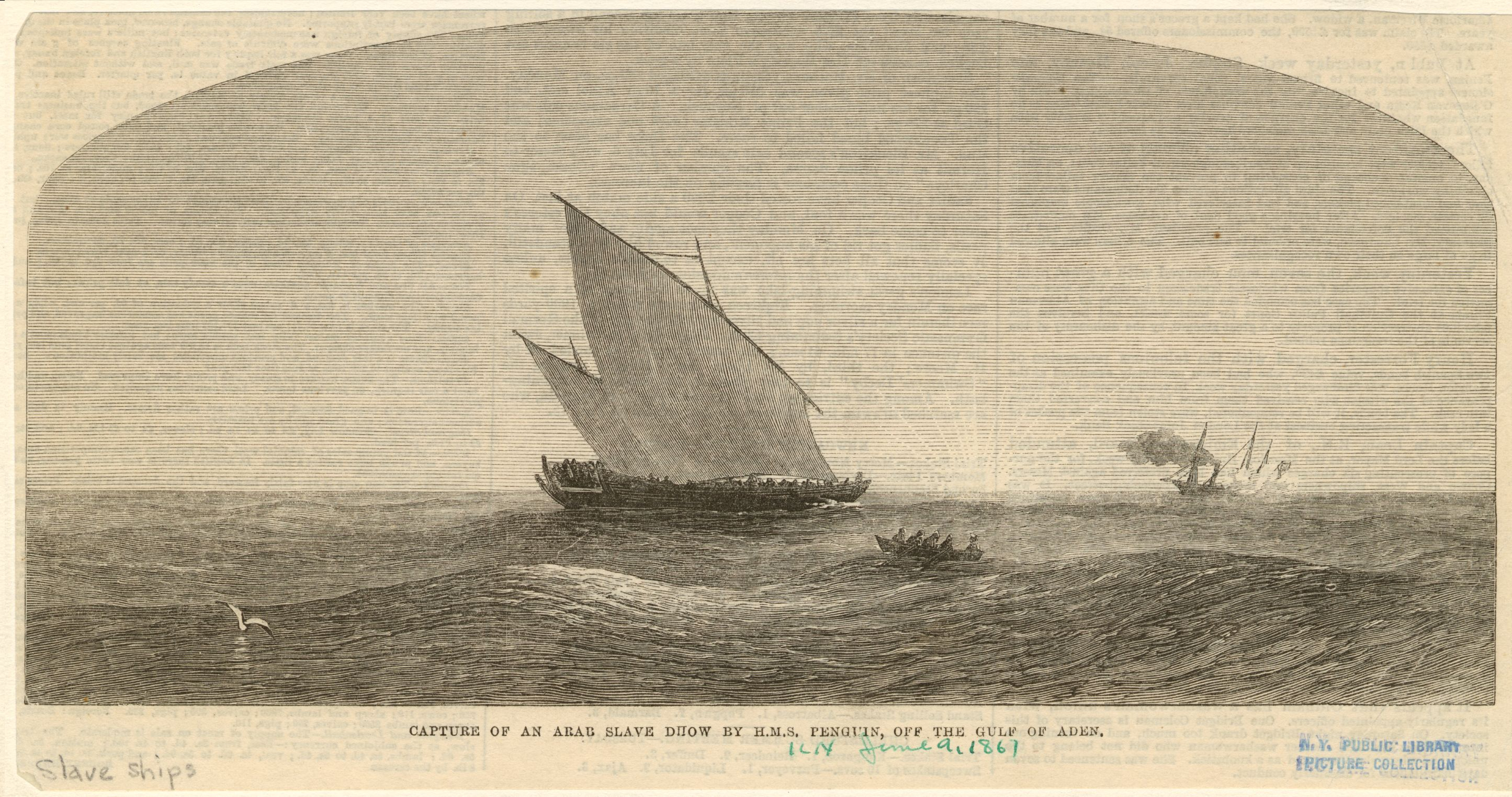
Capture of a slave dhow by HMS Penguin off the Gulf of Aden

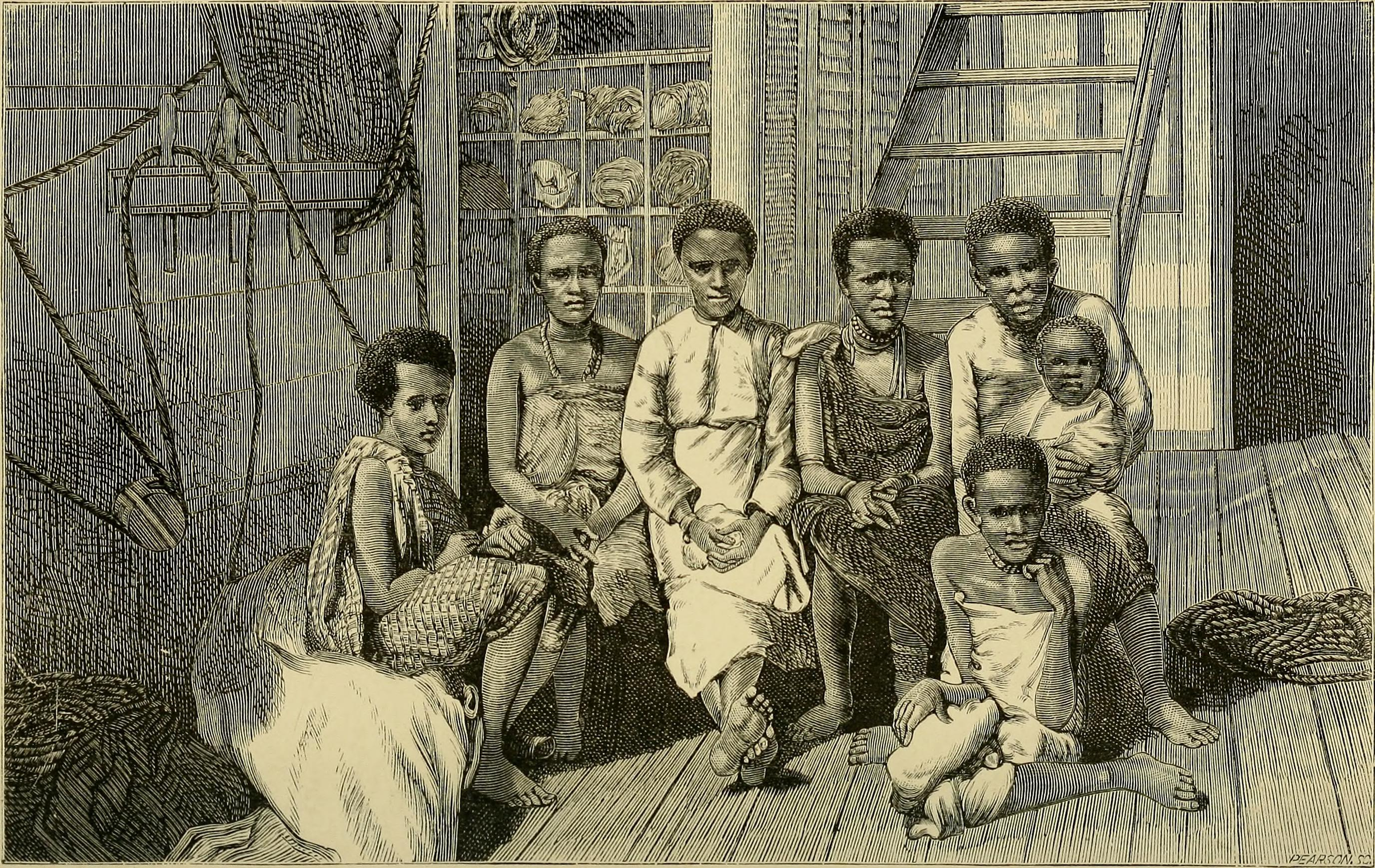
Slave-catching in the Indian Ocean, 1873.

Legal chattel slavery existed in the area which was later to become Oman from antiquity until the 1970s. Oman was united with Zanzibar from the 1690s until 1856, and was a significant center of the Indian Ocean slave trade from Zanzibar in East Africa to the Arabian Peninsula and Iran, a central hub of the regional slave trade, which constituted a large part of its economy.

Slavery was finally abolished by Sultan Qaboos bin Said during the Omani Renaissance after he deposed his father Sultan Said bin Taimur in the 1970 Omani coup d'état, on 23 July 1970. Many members of the Afro-Omani minority are descendants of the former slaves. When chattel slavery was abolished, it was replaced by the Kafala system, which has been described as a modern form of slavery.

== Omani Empire (1692–1856) ==
During the Omani Empire (1692–1856), Oman was a center of the Zanzibar slave trade. Slaves were trafficked from the Swahili coast of East Africa via Zanzibar to Oman. From Oman, the slaves were exported to the Arabian Peninsula and Persia. The capital Muscat controlled the trade of the Gulf and was the center of a flourishing slave trade commerce, being the base of Omani prosperity and the center of the entire coastal economy.

A second route of slave trade existed, with people from both Africa and East Asia, who were smuggled to Jeddah in the Arabian Peninsula in connection to the Muslim pilgrimage, Hajj, to Mecca and Medina. These slaves were imported from the Hejaz to Oman.

== Muscat and Oman (1856–1970) ==
In 1856, the Omani Empire was divided into the Sultanate of Zanzibar (1856–1964) and Muscat and Oman (1856–1970), but the slave trade continued.

=== Slave trade ===
After 1867, the British campaign against the Indian Ocean slave trade was undermined by Omani slave dhows using French colors trafficking slaves to Arabia and the Persian Gulf from East Africa as far South as Mozambique, which the French tolerated until 1905, when the Hague International Tribunal mandated France to curtail French flags to Omani dhows; nevertheless, small scale smuggling of slaves from East Africa to Arabia continued until the 1960s.

In 1873 the British and Sultan Turki signed a treaty that obliged Turki to end the import of slaves. This included "slaves who were destined for transport from one part of the Sultan's dominion to another, or using his land for passing them to foreign dominions. Anyone found involved in this traffic would be liable to detention and condemnation by all [British] Naval Officers and Agents, and all slaves entering the Sultan's dominions should be freed." Zanzibar nominally abolished the slave trade in 1876. In practice, however, the slave trade continued at a reduced level.

The slave trade from Africa shrank in the late 19th-century, but the slave trade from Hejaz continued. In 1927 a trial revealed a slave trade organization in which Indian children of both sexes were trafficked to Oman and Dubai via Persia and Gwadar. In the 1940s, a third slave trade route was noted, in which Balochis from Sindh were shipped across the Persian Gulf, many of whom had sold themselves or their children to escape poverty.

=== Slave market: function and conditions ===
Male slaves were used in a number of tasks: as soldiers, pearl divers, farm labourers, cash crop workers, maritime sailors, dock workers, porters, irrigation canal workers, fishermen, and domestic servants, while women functioned as domestic servants or concubines. Most of the male slaves imported to Oman were used for hard labour in the date plantations.

Female slaves were primarily used as either domestic servants, or as concubines, while male slaves were primarily used within the pearl industry as pearl divers. In 1943, it was reported that Muslim girls from Balochistan were shipped via Oman to Mecca, where they were popular as concubines since Caucasian (Circassian) girls were no longer available, and were sold for $350–450.

Black African women were primarily used as domestic house slaves rather than exclusively for sexual services, while white Caucasian women (normally Circassian or Georgian) were preferred as concubines (sex slaves); when the main slave route of white slave girls became harder to access after Russia's conquest of the Caucasus and Central Asia in the mid-19th century, Baluchi and "Red" Ethiopian (Oromo and Sidamo) women became the preferred targets for sexual slavery. British naval officer George Lydiard Sulivan in 1866 recounted a capture of slave dhows that were meant for the Imam of Muscat, three hundred slaves were aboard including fifty Oromo slave-girls, intended for the Imam's harem. In the early 19th century, James Baillie Fraser, writing about Said bin Sultan of Oman, noted that one of his three sons was born to an Abyssinian slave woman who had been manumitted for the purpose of becoming her master’s concubine, a practice he described as sometimes occurring when slave owners formed attachments to enslaved women.

Non-African female slaves were sold in the Persian Gulf where they were bought for marriage; these were fewer and often Armenian, Georgian, or from Baluchistan and India. In 1924, the law prohibited the enslavement of white girls (normally Armenian or Georgian) on Kuwaiti territory, but in 1928 at least 60 white slave girls were discovered.

Female slaves were often used for sexual services as concubines for a period of time, and then sold or married off to other slaves; the slave owners would arranged both marriages and divorce for their slaves, and the offspring of two slaves would become slaves in turn. It was common for slave owners to claim sexual services of married female slaves when the slave husband was away for long periods of time, to hunt for pearls or fish or similar labor, and sexual abuse was a common reason given when female slaves applied for manumission at the British Agency. It was common for Arab men to use the sexual services of enslaved African women, but a male African slave who had sexual relations with a local "pure blood" Arab woman would be executed to preserve tribal honor and social status, regardless if the couple had married or not.

The number of female slaves in the Gulf was as high or higher than that of male slaves, but the number of female slaves who made applications for manumission at the British Agencies in the Gulf was significantly lower (only 280 of 950 documented cases in 1921–1946), likely because in the Islamic society of the Gulf, where women were excluded from wage labour and public life, it was impossible for a freedwoman to survive without a male protector.

After slavery had been abolished in Bahrain in 1937, in Kuwait in 1949 and in Saudi Arabia in 1962, it still flourished in Oman. By this time, the Sultan himself reportedly owned around 500 slaves, an estimated 150 of whom were women, who were kept at his palace at Salalah; a number of his male slaves were rumoured at the time to have been physically deformed due to abuse.

Sultan Said bin Taimur reportedly owned around 500 slaves, descendants of enslaved people trafficked from Africa, which were "kept tightly isolated from the rest of the population, and banned from marrying or learning to read or write without his permission". After a slave began to evade control, he passed a law under which all people of African descent were legally classed as slaves. He reportedly "kept many of his slaves locked up there and used to enjoy beating them", and when he lived in Muscat during the 1950s, he "used to make his slaves swim in the water underneath his balcony and then amuse himself by shooting at fish around them".

A correspondent who visited Salala after Sultan Said's removal in 1970 reported:

"Among 12 slaves presented to foreign journalists some had been forced, under pain of beating, not to speak. As a result they had become mutes. Others stood with their heads bowed and eyes fixed on the ground, their necks now paralysed. The slightest glance sideways resulted in a severe beating or imprisonment. Others had incurred physical deformity from similar cruelty. Said was also found to have 150 women locked away in his palace and it was known by some of his British aides that he had been assaulting young girls".

== Abolitionist activism ==
The British Empire, having signed the 1926 Slavery Convention as a member of the League of Nations, was obliged to investigate, report and fight slavery and slave trade in all land under direct or indirect control of the British Empire. The British policy was thus abolitionist, however in reality they were reluctant to interfere in cultural issues if they feared their interference could cause unrest. Muscat and Oman was defined by the British as having a special relationship with the British Empire.

As was the case with the rest of the Gulf states, the British considered their control over the region insufficient to do something about the slavery and the slave trade. The British India Office advised the British authorities that any attempts to enforce any anti-slavery treaty in the region could cause economic and political unrest, since slavery was "deeply rooted in religious and political history". The British policy was therefore to assure the League of Nations that the region followed the same anti slavery treaties signed by the British, but in parallel prevent any international observations of the area, which would disprove these claims.

In 1929 the Sultan of Muscat, Taimur bin Feisal, expressed himself willing to abolish slavery, but that it would be impossible to enforce such a ban, since he claimed not to have actual control over the tribes in the Omani hinterland and Bathina.

In 1932, the Sultan of Muscat and Oman informed the Committee of Experts on Slavery that he was unable to prevent slavery since he had no control over the "warlike and uncivilised tribes" of the interior of the country, but by this time, British patrol boats had almost eradicated the Indian Ocean slave trade to the Omani coast.

In 1936, the British acknowledged to Advisory Committee of Experts on Slavery of the League of Nations that there was still ongoing slavery and slave trade in Oman and Qatar, but claimed that it was limited, and that all slaves who sought asylum at British Agents Office in Sharjah were granted manumission. In the 1940s, there were several suggestions made by the British to combat the slave trade and slavery in the region, but none were considered enforceable.

=== Abolition ===
After World War II, there was growing international pressure from the United Nations to end the slave trade. In 1948, the United Nations declared slavery to be a crime against humanity in the Universal Declaration of Human Rights, after which the Anti-Slavery Society pointed out that there were about one million slaves in the Arabian Peninsula, which was a crime against the 1926 Slavery Convention, and demanded that the UN form a committee to handle the issue. The UN formed the Ad Hoc Committee on Slavery in 1950, which resulted in the introduction of the Supplementary Convention on the Abolition of Slavery. The Ad Hoc Committee on Slavery filed a report on the chattel slavery in Oman during the 1950-1951 investigation.

The British were criticised by the UN for supporting the Sultan of Oman, a known slave owner, to protect economic interests. In 1951, the British founded the Trucial Oman Levies or Trucial Oman Scouts in Sharjah to fight the slave trade.

The British reporter James Morris of The Times visited Oman in 1956 and was told by the British consul that the Sultan had manumitted his slaves, but when he asked the Sultan's bodyguard and his servants they replied that they were not free to leave; when Morris confronted the British representatives, they told him the servants were simply called slaves.

The Anti-Slavery International asked the British Foreign Office to include the abolition of slavery as condition for continued help in 1958, but was met with the reply that military help did not entitle the British to ask the Sultan to end an institution recognized by Muslim Law.

The British and the Sultan both preferred to give the impression that slavery was, in fact, no longer an issue in Oman. The British continued the Sultan of Oman as a highly prioritised ally in the region due to the oil and the Masirah air base, and therefore disliked British press attention to the issue of slavery in Oman. When asked about the house slaves common of Oman in 1963, the reply was that the slaves were, in fact, nowadays "unpaid family retainers who, being unpaid, represent wealth to their employers" and had chosen to remain with their former owners of their own free will.

While the issue of slavery in Oman was discussed in the UN, the issue of slavery itself was a very sensitive issue for the Arab member countries and therefore not easy to address.

After the revolt in Dhofar was contained by the British in 1965, the Arab representatives at the UN condemned the British at the UN in 1966; they did not mention the fact that the British tolerated slavery in Oman, which was a sensitive issue in the Arab World, but rather focused on Colonialism; however, the Anti-Slavery Society did address the issue of slavery in Oman at this time. On 23 July 1970, the Sultan of Oman Said bin Taimur was deposed in the 1970 Omani coup d'état and his successor Qaboos bin Said initiated a number of reforms, including the abolition of slavery.

Slavery was formally abolished in Oman in 1970. Many members of the Afro-Omani minority are descendants of former slaves.

== Modern slavery ==
When classic chattel slavery was abolished, it was replaced by the Kafala system, which has been described as a modern form of slavery.

=== Kafala system ===
In Oman, the kafala system is regulated by the foreign residency law and accompanying laws, while the system is enforced by the Ministry of Manpower and the Royal Oman Police. According to Oman's 2003 Labour Law, an employer needs a permit issued by the Ministry of Manpower in order to import foreign workers. Furthermore, migrant workers are prohibited from working for another employer. The Labour Law places responsibility for the migrant worker on the employer. The 2003 Law also sets conditions for the labour contract, as well as the rights and obligations of both employers and migrant workers, including the provision of medical facilities, suitable means of transport, and a minimum wage by the Council of Ministers. In addition, if a migrant worker wishes to change employers, the employee needs to receive a No Objection Certificate from the employer.

In 2011, Oman reportedly informed the United Nations Human Rights Council that alternatives to the kafala system were being considered. However, the sponsorship system still remains in place. Legislative amendments to the Omani labour laws were under consideration in late 2016. The Ministry of Manpower also announced in 2016 the abolition of the obligatory No Objection Certificate.

== See also ==
- Afro-Omanis
- Human rights in Oman#Domestic workers
- History of slavery in the Muslim world
- History of concubinage in the Muslim world
- Slavery in Saudi Arabia
- Human trafficking in the Middle East
- Human trafficking in Oman
