= Muwatin =

Omani magazine

Muwatin (Arabic: مواطن, literal translation: Citizen) is an independent Omani magazine. Founded in 2013 by Omani journalist Mohammed Al-Fazari and currently based in the United Kingdom, it is published by the Muwatin Media Network on a monthly basis. The magazine traditionally focuses on Omani and Gulf topics such as politics, human rights, and economics. As of June 2021, over 50 issues have been published. The magazine's website is blocked in Oman and Saudi Arabia.

== History ==
The magazine temporarily suspended its activities from January 2016 to April 2016 due to "circumstances beyond its control" and pressures from the Omani authorities, before relaunching from London.
