= Human rights in Oman =

Oman is an absolute monarchy in which all legislative, executive, and judiciary power ultimately rests in the hands of the hereditary sultan, and in which the system of laws is based firmly on rule by decree. Although a report by the U.S. State Department, based on conditions in 2010, summed up the human rights situation in the country by asserting that the government "generally respected the human rights of its citizens", several international human rights groups have described the state of human rights in Oman in highly critical terms. Article 41 of the Basic Statute of Oman criminalizes any criticism of the sultan, stating that "the sultan's person is inviolable and must be respected and his orders must be obeyed".

Freedom House has routinely rated the country "Not Free" and an official of Human Rights Watch, in a December 2012 overview of Oman and "five other smaller Gulf states," stated: "Human rights conditions...are quite poor overall....There is little respect for core civil and political rights such as freedom of expression, freedom of assembly, and association. Peaceful dissent typically faces harsh repression. The administration of justice is highly personalised, with limited due process protections, especially in political and security-related cases". A 2012 report by Bertelsmann Stiftung declared that while "Oman's legal code theoretically protects civil liberties and personal freedoms, both are regularly ignored by the regime. Oman, therefore, cannot be considered free."

On the other hand, Middle East Concern, in a 2011 report, claimed that Oman's recent human rights record had been generally good, citing adherence to proper arrest and judicial procedures and acceptable prison conditions, even as it acknowledged the limits on freedom of expression and assembly, academic freedom, and other restrictions.

In reaction to growing public demonstrations by protesters demanding greater freedom and human rights, Oman's already severe constraints on freedom of speech, assembly, and association have been tightened even further since early 2011.

== Historical background ==
Oman, whose population as of 2018 of 4.8 million includes about two million non-citizens, has been an independent sultanate since 1650 and has been governed by the Al Bu Sa'id family since the 18th century. Sultan Qaboos bin Said al Said, who attained power by overthrowing his father, ruled from 1970 to 2020 and "followed a path of careful and gradual development and modernization", eliminating many of the "harsh restrictions on various personal freedoms" that were enforced under his father's regime and granting amnesty to many of its opponents.

In 1996, Sultan Qaboos issued a royal decree promulgating the basic law, which is considered to be Oman's constitution. It guaranteed citizens' basic civil rights and established a bicameral legislature, the Council of Oman, consisting of an upper chamber, the State Council (Majlis al-Dawla), the 75 members of which are appointed by the sultan and have only advisory powers; and a lower chamber, the Consultative Council (Majlis al-Shura), which is elected by the people. Both chambers, however, are ultimately advisory in nature, with sole legislative, executive, and judicial power still resting entirely in the hands of the sultan.

== Freedom from torture ==
The practice of torture is widespread in Oman state penal institutions and has become the state's typical reaction to independent political expression. Torture methods in use in Oman include mock execution, beating, hooding, solitary confinement, subjection to extremes of temperature and to constant noise, abuse and humiliation. There have been numerous reports of torture and other inhumane forms of punishment perpetrated by Omani security forces on protesters and detainees. Several prisoners detained in 2012 complained of sleep deprivation, extreme temperatures, and solitary confinement. Omani authorities kept Sultan al-Saadi in solitary confinement, denied him access to his lawyer and family, forced him to wear a black bag over his head whenever he left his cell, including when using the restroom, and told him his family had "forsaken" him and asked for him to be imprisoned.

== Abductions and arbitrary arrests ==
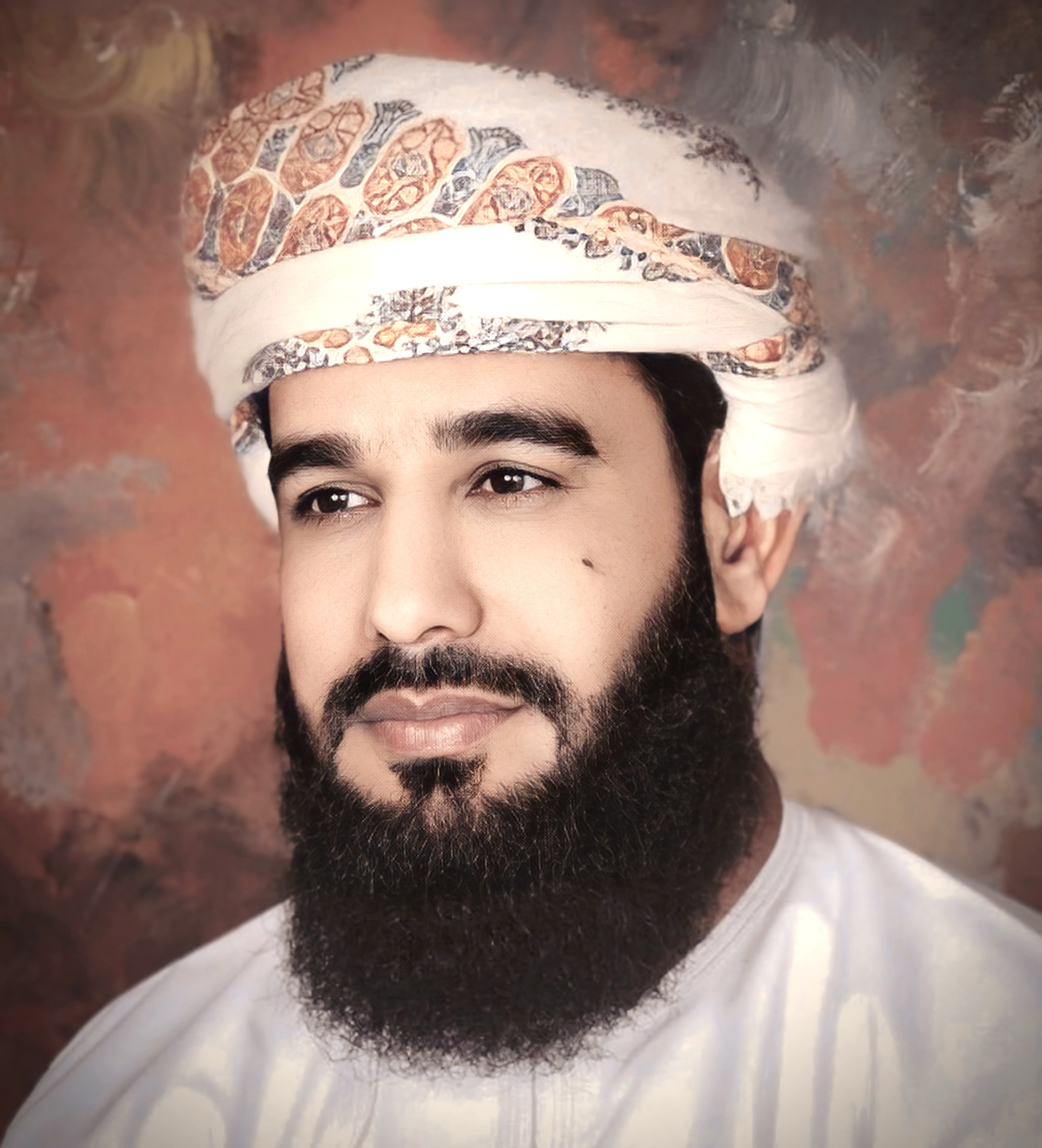
Talib Al Mamari, a former member of the Consultative Assembly of Oman, who was arrested in 2013 after participating in a peaceful protest as a mediator. The UN Working Group on Arbitrary Detention (WGAD) deemed his detention arbitrary and a violation of his right to freedom of expression.

In 2012, armed security forces arrested Sultan al-Saadi, a social media activist. According to reports, authorities detained him at an unknown location for one month for comments he posted online critical of the government. Authorities previously arrested al-Saadi in 2011 for participating in protests and again in 2012 for posting comments online deemed insulting to Sultan Qaboos.

Talib Al Mamari, a former member of Oman’s Consultative Assembly (Majlis al-Shura), was arrested in August 2013 after participating in a peaceful protest in his province of Liwa against pollution from nearby petrochemical industries. He was charged with “harming the State’s prestige,” “obstructing traffic,” and “disturbing public order.” Initially sentenced to four years in prison, his sentence was later reduced to three years on appeal. He was released in May 2016 following a royal pardon.

International bodies, including the UN Working Group on Arbitrary Detention (WGAD), deemed his detention arbitrary and a violation of his right to freedom of expression. The WGAD's opinion highlighted that the broad interpretation of the charge “harming the State’s prestige” could infringe upon the rights to peaceful assembly and expression, as guaranteed by the Universal Declaration of Human Rights. Amnesty International also recognized Al Mamari as a prisoner of conscience, asserting that his arrest was politically motivated and based solely on his participation in a peaceful protest.

There were more reports of politically motivated disappearances in the country. In May 2012, security forces detained Ismael al-Meqbali, Habiba al-Hinai and Yaqoub al-Kharusi, human rights activists who were visiting striking oil workers. Authorities released al-Hinai and al-Kharusi shortly after their detention but did not inform al-Meqbali's friends and family of his whereabouts for weeks. Authorities pardoned al-Meqbali in March.

In December 2013, a Yemeni national disappeared in Oman after he was arrested at a checkpoint in Dhofar Governorate. Omani authorities refuse to acknowledge his detention. His whereabouts and condition remain unknown.

In January 2014, Omani intelligence agents arrested a Bahraini actor and handed him over to the Bahraini authorities on the same day of his arrest. The actor has been subjected to a forced disappearance, his whereabouts and condition remain unknown.

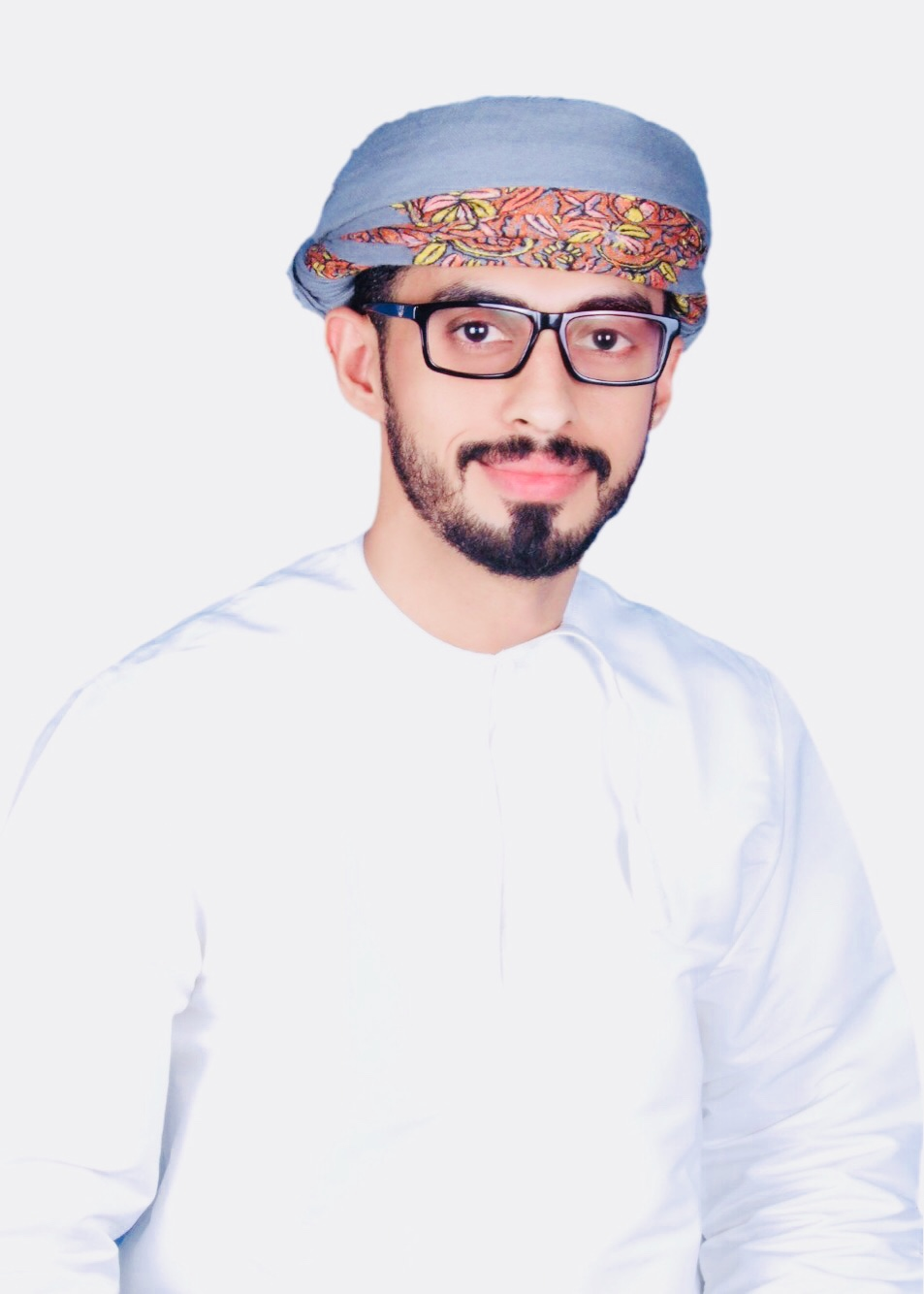
Mohammed Al-Fazari, an exiled Omani writer and journalist now living in the UK, is an author whose books are banned in Oman. He is also the founder and EIC of Muwatin.

In August 2014, The Omani writer and human rights defender Mohammed Al-Fazari, the founder and editor-in-chief of the e-magazine Muwatin "Citizen", disappeared after going to the police station in the Al-Qurum district of Muscat. For several months the Omani government denied his detention and refused to disclose information about his whereabouts or condition. On 17 July 2015, Al-Fazari left Oman seeking political asylum in UK after a travel ban was issued against him without providing any reasons and after his official documents including his national ID and passport were confiscated for more than 8 months. There were more reports of politically motivated disappearances in the country.

According to Amnesty International annual report 2016, The authorities continued restricting freedom of expression. Many journalists and activists were arrested under penal code provisions which criminalize insulting the Sultan. In March 2015, Talib al-Saeedi, online activist, was arrested for three weeks without charge. Days after, a court sentenced Saeed al-Daroodi, blogger, to one year in prison and a fine; convicting him of “trying to overthrow the government” and “spreading hate”.

According to a report, on 20 December 2015, poet and television producer Nasser al-Badri was summoned by the Police Special Section and detained for 12 days without charge and without trial. The report added that the Omani Observatory for Human Rights said that al-Badri was detained because of tweets he posted criticising Sultan Qaboos and the state of the country's economy.

== National Human Rights Commission of Oman ==
The National Human Rights Commission, established in 2008, is not independent from the regime. It is chaired by the former deputy inspector general of Police and Customs and its members are appointed by royal decree. In June 2012, one of its members requested that she be relieved of her duties because she disagreed with a statement made by the Commission justifying the arrest of intellectuals and bloggers and the restriction of freedom of expression in the name of respect for “the principles of religion and customs of the country”.

== Democratic rights ==
The Omani government is a monarchy. The sultan is the leader of the country and serves as the country's chief of state and head of government. The monarchy is hereditary and the monarch's cabinet is appointed by him.

Citizens of Oman can vote for members of the Parliament. The members are elected by popular vote to serve four-year terms. The Consultative Assembly of Oman enjoys legislative and audit powers. The country has universal suffrage for people 21 years of age and older; however, members of the military and security forces are not allowed to vote.

== Basic rights ==
The Basic Law forbids discrimination founded on "gender, origin, color, language, religion, sect, domicile, or social status." Oman's government does not commit arbitrary killings, engineer forced disappearances, or engage in torture or other cruel punishments. Laws against corruption are effectively enforced. The public has no access to official information. Since 2006, citizens of Gulf Cooperation Council countries are permitted to own property in Oman; non-GCC citizens can only own tourist properties.

Although Islam is Oman's state religion, the Basic Law guarantees the "freedom to practice religious rites in accordance with recognized customs...provided that it does not disrupt public order or conflict with accepted standards of behavior." Freedom House declared in 2005 that "Oman is, overall, a religiously tolerant society," noting that while non-Muslims "are able to practice their religious rites freely, they are required to register with the government and may not proselytize or publish religious materials." The U.S. State Department's International Religious Freedom Report for 2011 notes that non-Muslim communities in Oman "are allowed to practice their beliefs without interference only on land specifically donated by the sultan for the purpose of collective worship." While "gatherings of a religious nature are not allowed in private homes or in any location other than government-approved houses of worship," Oman's government "has not actively enforced the prohibition".

Freedom of movement within Oman and repatriation are permitted, but it can be difficult to obtain permission to travel abroad or emigrate. Only since 2010 have married women been able to secure passports without their husbands' consent. Citizens require government permission to marry foreigners unless the latter are citizens of Gulf Cooperation Council countries. Permission is not always granted. If a citizen marries a foreigner abroad without approval, the foreign spouse may be denied entry into Oman and any children of the marriage may be denied citizenship of Oman.

There is limited freedom of speech and of the press, and self-censorship by journalists and writers is standard practice. Criticizing the sultan is illegal, as are many other kinds of expression, including those that are viewed as offending personal dignity or violating public order. "The penal code prescribes a prison sentence and fine for anyone who publicly blasphemes God or His prophets, commits an affront to religious groups by spoken or written word, or breaches the peace of a lawful religious gathering," according to a U.S. State Department report issued in 2012. The contents of all print media are subject to official pre-publication review. As of 2010, three prominent authors were prohibited from speaking in public. In the same year, officials banned the display of a number of historical and literary works at the Muscat International Book Fair.

Merely mentioning the existence of such restrictions can land Omanis in trouble. In 2009, a web publisher was fined and given a suspended jail sentence for revealing that a supposedly live TV programme was actually pre-recorded to eliminate any criticisms of the government. The country's eight privately owned newspapers generally follow a pro-government line, and the government's many newspapers, magazines, and radio and TV stations are consistently pro-government. Oman's four private radio and TV stations, for which Oman first issued licenses in October 2005, also tend to hew to a pro-government line. Inhabitants of Oman are allowed to watch satellite TV broadcasts from other countries, and this, along with a rapid increase in Internet penetration (from 9% in 2008 to over 40% in 2010) has “allowed the emergence of social, economic and even political debates.”

Oman's government monitors cell-phone conversations, e-mail exchanges, and Internet chat rooms, and restricts free speech on the Internet, blocking access to many websites and posting notices on other sites warning against criticism of the sultan or other officials. In the same way, the government limits the freedom of academics to discuss or write about certain matters, with faculty members engaging in systematic self-censorship. University professors are prohibited from writing about or discussing local politics, and are subject to dismissal if they violate this rule.

To form an association requires a permit, which can take years to obtain; in many cases, the government has denied permits. For an association to accept international funding without government approval is a crime punishable by up to six months in prison. All public cultural events and any kind of public meeting must be approved by the government. Religious gatherings are generally permitted, while political gatherings are illegal, as are political parties. Oman first allowed political posters, banners, and TV and newspaper ads in 2007.

In 2011, under the influence of the Arab Spring, the number of persons publicly demonstrating for political reform and for jobs increased significantly, and in response Oman tightened its already severe limits on free speech, with police employing excessive force, arresting hundreds, and causing deaths and injuries. Sultan Qaboos pardoned 234 people who had committed "crimes of crowding in the streets." The Press and Publications Law was made harsher, with the penalty for the publication of certain types of materials set at up to two years in prison plus a fine. Under the law, the editor-in-chief of the Azzamn newspaper, one of his reporters, and a source working for the Ministry of Justice were sentenced to five months in prison over an article that was deemed insulting to the Minister of Justice.

In the wake of the nationwide demonstrations of 2011, the government promised to institute reforms. Its failure to do so led to further protests, and on May 31, 2012, it began arresting writers and bloggers who had criticized its inaction. On June 11, it took into custody at least 22 persons who publicly protested these arrests. On July 9 and 16, several individuals were found guilty of "defaming the sultan," a charge stemming at least in part from Facebook postings and Twitter tweets. Human Rights Watch criticized these prosecutions. "Like people throughout the region, Omanis are sick and tired of having no say in the governance of their country," said Nadim Houry of HRW. "Rather than listening to legitimate demands and peaceful criticism, Omani authorities are jailing people who speak out."

In 2012, an appeals court affirmed the conviction of 29 human rights activists on such charges as insulting the sultan and of unlawful assembly, and all but one of them began serving prison sentences. Amnesty International stated its belief "that many, if not all, of those imprisoned are held solely for peacefully exercising their right to freedom of expression or assembly and are therefore prisoners of conscience," and called on Oman to immediately release all of those being "held simply for peacefully exercising their right to freedom of expression or assembly." In September 2012, Freedom House criticized the "escalating efforts by the government to tighten its control online and offline following Arab Spring-inspired unrest," and Front Line Defenders condemned "the ongoing judicial harassment of...human rights defenders and peaceful protesters" and expressed its view that this harassment "is directly related to their legitimate activities in the defense of human rights." Faced with so many restrictions, Omanis have resorted to unconventional methods for expressing their views. Omanis sometimes use donkeys to express their views. Writing about Gulf rulers in 2001, Dale Eickelman observed: "Only in Oman has the occasional donkey… been used as a mobile billboard to express anti-regime sentiments. There is no way in which police can maintain dignity in seizing and destroying a donkey on whose flank a political message has been inscribed." Some people have been arrested for allegedly spreading fake news about the COVID-19 pandemic in Oman.

== Internet rights ==
Oman is engaged in pervasive Internet filtering of social media, substantial filtering of Internet tools, and selective political filtering, with there being no evidence of filtering in the conflict/security area according to a report by the OpenNet Initiative in August 2009.

Oman engages in extensive filtering of pornographic websites, gay and lesbian content, content that is critical of Islam, content about illegal drugs, and anonymizer sites used to circumvent blocking. There is no evidence of technical filtering of political content, but laws and regulations restrict free expression online and encourage self-censorship.

Human Rights Watch reported in June 2012 that according to Omani human rights activists, the government had been increasingly monitoring their online activity; one of the activists said "that authorities hacked into his email account and deleted all his contacts. Others alleged that authorities hacked the Facebook page of the Omani Group for Human Rights and deleted all the postings."

== Domestic workers ==
The descendants of servant tribes and slaves are victims of widespread discrimination. Oman was one of the last countries to abolish slavery in 1970.

The plight of domestic workers in Oman is a taboo subject. In 2011, the Philippines government determined that out of all the countries in the Middle East, only Oman and Israel qualify as safe for Filipino migrants. In 2012, it was reported that every 6 days, an Indian migrant in Oman commits suicide. There has been a campaign urging authorities to check the migrant suicide rate. In the 2014 Global Slavery Index, Oman is ranked No. 45 due to 26,000 people in slavery.

== Marriage ==
Omani citizens need government permission to marry foreigners. The Ministry of Interior requires Omani citizens to obtain permission to marry foreigners (except nationals of GCC countries); permission is not automatically granted. Citizen marriage to a foreigner abroad without ministry approval may result in denial of entry for the foreign spouse at the border and preclude children from claiming citizenship rights. It also may result in a bar from government employment and a fine of 2,000 rials ($5,200).

== Children's rights ==
There are no reports of child prostitution in Oman. Child labor is not a problem. In 2003, the government raised the minimum age to work from 13 to 15 years of age.

A child born in Oman inherits citizenship from the biological father Primary-school education is free but not compulsory. Oman is not a party to the 1980 Hague Convention on the Civil Aspects of International Child Abduction.

== Women's rights ==
Oman is a party to the UN Convention on the Elimination of All Forms of Discrimination against Women and has a government committee that monitors compliance. Although discrimination against women is technically prohibited, with women officially enjoying equality in regard to such matters as employment rights, cultural traditions still reject equality of the sexes, and sharia law continues to enshrine discrimination in practice. (However, the 2012 report by the Bertelsmann Stifting says that “the government passed a law in 2008 stipulating that men’s and women’s legal testimonies should be considered equal.”) Since 2008, women have enjoyed the same property ownership rights as men, and as of 2010, women can marry without parental consent. In accordance with sharia, however, Muslim women cannot marry non-Muslim men, even though Muslim men can marry non-Muslim women.

Rape is punishable by up to 15 years in prison, but for cultural and social reasons, many rapes probably go unreported. Domestic violence complaints are generally handled by authorities. Female genital mutilation is permitted and widely accepted and practiced, although doctors are not allowed to perform the procedure in health-care facilities. Women receive decent medical treatment, including prenatal and postnatal care.

In 2005, Freedom House noted that Oman's women had "made steady progress" over the preceding decade, with women constituting a majority of university students level "despite gender-discriminatory practices in the enrollment process" and making up an "estimated one-third of all civil servants." In 2012, Bertelsmann Stiftung described the status of women in Oman as follows: "Oman has been successful in enhancing the status of women, who – at least in theory – have the same opportunities as men in public and private jobs. Oman's government has a deliberate policy of inclusiveness regarding all segments of the population. In reality, however, women...still face high barriers to participation in formal economic activities."

In 2010, Oman celebrated National Oman Women's Day for the first time.

== Minority groups ==
The descendants of servant tribes and of African slaves who are considered to be of non-Arab blood are the objects of widespread discrimination. Freedom House noted in 2016 that "The 1996 basic law banned discrimination on the basis of sex, religion, ethnicity, and social class. However, Omani law does not protect noncitizens from discrimination." About a quarter of Omani residents "are left without legal protections". In 2003, Human Rights Watch asked Sultan Qaboos to ratify the International Convention on the Protection of the Rights of all Migrant Workers and Members of their Families.

== Disabled rights ==
A U.S. State Department report issued in 2012 states that under Omani law "all buildings must have access for disabled individuals," but a 2011 State Department report makes a distinction, noting that while new buildings are required to be made handicapped-accessible, old buildings are not retrofitted. Although a law requires large private employers to give at least 2 percent of jobs to disabled people, this requirement is not consistently enforced. There is no law requiring equal educational opportunities for disabled persons. The Ministry of Social Development is charged with protecting disabled people's rights.

== LGBTQ rights ==
There is considerable discrimination against LGBTQ persons, and individuals engaging in homosexual conduct are subject to prosecution and can be imprisoned for up to three years. In 2009, nine persons were prosecuted for sodomy. Any discussion whatsoever of sexual orientation in Oman is taboo, and LGBT content on the Internet is censored.

In 2013, the Gulf Cooperative Countries had agreed on a proposal to establish some form of, yet unknown, testing in order to ban gay foreigners from entering any of the countries.

== Rights of refugees and asylum seekers ==
Oman has a system in place for helping refugees and asylum seekers, but owing to its tight border controls there are few such persons asking for help. Oman is not a party to the 1951 UN Convention relating to the Status of Refugees or its 1967 Protocol, and does not protect persons from being returned to countries where they are in danger. In 2010 alone, hundreds of individuals from nearby countries who tried to enter Oman illegally were returned to their homelands.

== Rights of persons under arrest ==
According to the United States Department of State as of 2011, Omani law prohibits arbitrary arrest and detention, and the government generally observed these prohibitions. The police academy program includes training in human rights. Police do not have to secure a warrant before taking a suspect into custody, but within 24 hours of such an action, the public prosecutor must either make a formal arrest or release the individual, who cannot be held in pretrial detention without a court order. Authorities respected these rights in practice, although foreigners who are suspected of being in Oman illegally are occasionally held without charge until their immigration status can be ascertained. There is a bail system, and defendants can choose their own lawyers or be provided with public defenders if necessary.

In 2016, Human Rights Watch reported that an Omani court sentenced three journalists to prison and ordered the permanent closure of their newspaper over an article that alleged corruption in the judiciary system. The court sentenced two of them to three years in prison and ordered them to pay a fine of 3,000 Omani rials on the charge of "disturbing public order," "misusing the internet," and "publishing details of a civil case". These broad restrictions on reporting appear to violate international standards of freedom of expression, including the right to criticize government officials.

== Rights of persons on trial ==
Oman's courts are not guided by sharia law. Although the judiciary generally acts independently, the sultan has the power to overrule decisions and grant pardons. Defendants are presumed innocent. There are no juries. Defendants enjoy all the usual rights, including the right to present evidence and appeal decisions, although some judges ask that the fathers or husbands of female defendants accompany them to the courtroom.

== Rights of prisoners ==
As a rule, prisons meet international standards. Prisoners are allowed to receive visitors and practice their religion. Prison conditions are monitored, and complaints of abuse are addressed by the national human rights commission.

== Employees' rights ==
Government employees and domestic workers cannot join unions, but most others can. The government must be notified a month in advance of union meetings. The right to strike is subject to several conditions, one of them being that employers must be informed of planned strikes three weeks in advance. Collective bargaining is allowed. Forced labor is illegal, although some foreigners are apparently engaged in involuntary servitude. Children under 15 are not allowed to work, and there are limits on work by those under 18, although some children work in small family businesses. There is a low minimum wage that does not apply in a number of sectors, and there are various restrictions on working conditions that are not uniformly enforced. Occupational health and safety codes are generally enforced, however.

== Freedom of speech and freedom of movement ==
February 2017, Human Rights Watch released a report about the violation of the right of speech and freedom of movement in Oman. In June 2012, Al-Fazari, the founder and editor-in-chief of Muwatin magazine was arrested by Omani authorities, and held in a solitary confinement. The charges included "gathering with the intent of rioting" and "insulting the Sultan", yet he was freed, then. On August 30, 2014, he was arrested again, held incommunicado for six days, and then released without charges. In spite of being banned from travelling abroad, he left the country seeking asylum in the United Kingdom on July 17. As a result, his brother, Mahmoud Al-Fazari, was arrested and detained for three weeks but then released without charges and his wife, his 3-year-old daughter and his 1-year-old son were prevented from going out to the United Arab Emirates.

== See also ==
- LGBT rights in Oman
- Human rights in Muslim-majority countries
