= Mohammed Al-Fazari =

Omani writer, based in the UK

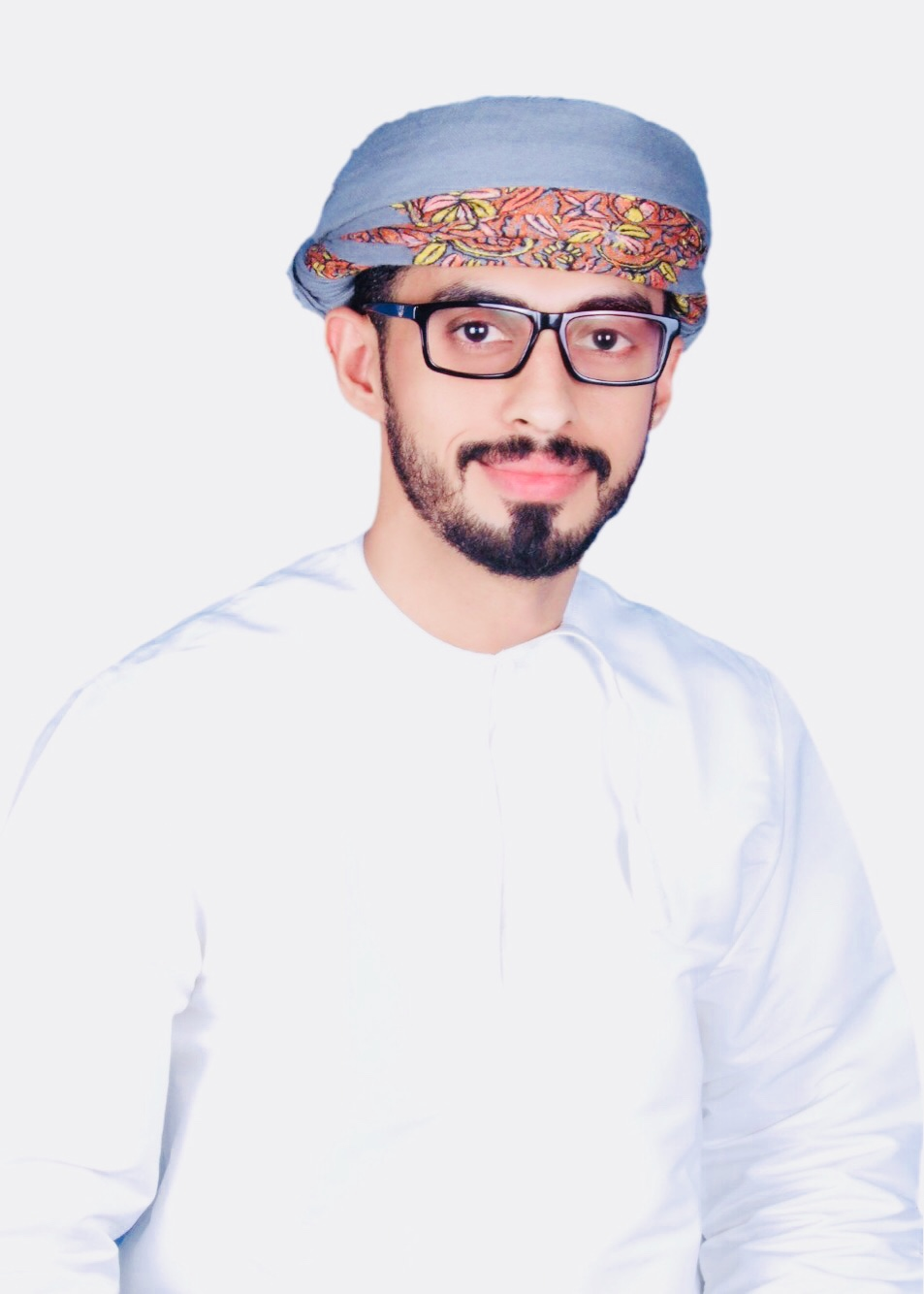
- Born: 1988 (age 37–38); Sohar, Oman
- Occupations: Writer, Researcher, Novelist & Journalist

Mohammed Al-Fazari (Arabic: محمد الفزاري) is CEO and editor-in-chief of Muwatin Media Network. He took part in the 2011 Omani protests during the Arab Spring and was persecuted for his political activism in Oman. He sought asylum in the UK and is the author of several books.

== Education ==
Al-Fazari completed his undergraduate studies at Sultan Qaboos University. He then pursued higher education in the United Kingdom at the University of London, School of Oriental and African Studies (SOAS). He obtained a master's degree in Middle East politics and a doctorate in political science and international studies.

== Books ==
Al-Fazari published a novel with Al-Intishar Al-Arabi Foundation titled (From the Depths of the Grave), 2013. In 2016, he prepared and edited a book titled: (Oman: Challenges of the Present and Prospects of the Future). He also published another novel titled: (Uncertainty) with Dar Arab London in its first edition in 2018, and with the Arab Institution for Studies and Publishing in its second edition in 2024. In 2020, through the Arab Scientific Publishers, he published a book titled: (Control of Information: A Study of the Regime and the Press in Oman). In 2025, Al-Fazari published his first intellectual book titled (Visa), with the subtitle Unsettling Reflections, through the Arab Institution for Studies and Publishing in Beirut. At the beginning of 2026, Al-Fazari announced the publication of his academic book in English, titled Qaboosism, released by Palgrave Macmillan. In November of the same year, an Arabic translation of the book, titled Qaboosism, was published by Muwatin Publications | Muwatin Media Network, in partnership with the Arab Institute for Research and Publishing.

== Political activity in Oman ==
In 2011, Al-Fazari participated in the Omani Spring in front of the Shura Council in the capital, Muscat. After the sit-ins were forcibly dispersed, he continued attending and organizing several vigils, as well as blogging.

In June 2012, Al-Fazari was arrested at a vigil in front of the police headquarters. He was held in solitary confinement in a secret prison affiliated with Oman's Internal Security Agency. He was interrogated on charges of forming an organization to overthrow the government and for insulting the country's Sultan.

He was sentenced along with 10 other human rights defenders to one and a half years in prison. On 17 March 2013, the Muscat Court of Appeal ordered his release.

Al-Fazari founded the magazine Muwatin in June 2013. After Muwatin called for political reform in Oman and the Gulf countries, Al-Fazari was arrested in August 2014 and held incommunicado for six days. He was arrested again on 22 December 2014 at Muscat International Airport by security authorities who informed him that a travel ban had been issued against him. After appearing before the Special Division of the Omani Police in Muscat for an investigation, he was arrested and released on the same day without his official documents, even though no charges were brought against him.

== Exile in the UK ==
Al-Fazari left Oman and settled in the United Kingdom as a political refugee in July 2015. Amnesty International has called on the Omani government to end its harassment of his family.
