= Muwatin Media Network =

Arabic non-profit media network based in Oman

- شبكة مواطن الإعلامية
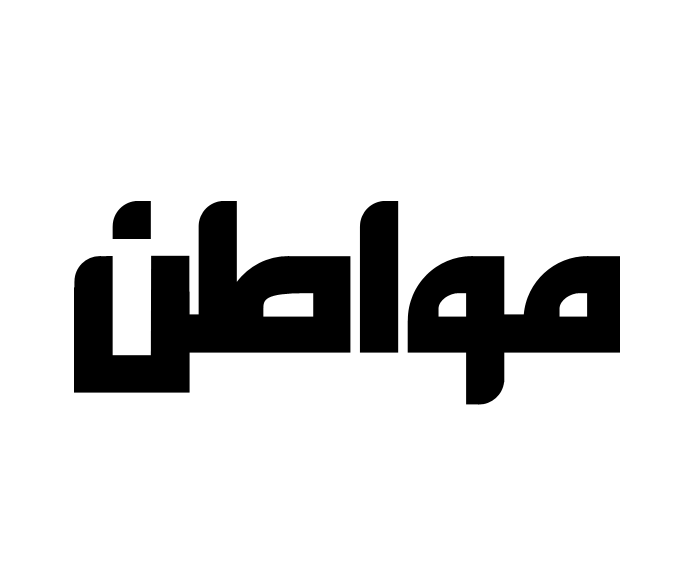
- Founder: Mohammed Al-Fazari
- Founded at: Oman
- Type: NGO
- Location: London, United Kingdom
- Official language: Arabic
- Website: muwatin.net

Muwatin Media Network is an Arabic non-profit media network founded in Oman in 2013 by Mohammed Al-Fazari. It is an independent media platform that publishes content in Arabic about a range of issues dealing with democracy, politics, civil and political rights, social and cultural rights, gender rights, sexuality and many others.

After the arrest of its Executive director and Editor in Chief Mohammed Al-Fazari in Oman in 2014 for his political activism, and his escape to the UK seeking political asylum, Muwatin, a magazine published by the network, was forced to cease publishing on 14 January 2016 after the arrests and interrogations of its contributing journalists living in Oman.

Muwatin was officially back to publishing on May 3, 2017 on World Press Freedom Day after it was registered in London.

== History ==
Muwatin (مواطن) means "citizen" in Arabic. The name was chosen because Muwatin is concerned with citizen issues in the Gulf and the Arab world and it seeks to establish a state of citizenship.

Mohammed Al-Fazari founded Muwatin on June 6, 2013, to create a space for freedom of expression for the Omani and Arab voices. The work began on a voluntary basis, as funding could not be obtained inside Oman due to the network's editorial policy, and funding from abroad was prohibited by the Omani law due to Muwatin's content dealing with issues of freedom and human rights.

After Muwatin called for political reform in Oman and the Gulf countries, its Editor in Chief Al-Fazari was arrested in August 2014 and was held incommunicado for six days. He was arrested again on 22 December 2014 at Muscat International airport by security authorities who informed him that a travel ban had been issued against him. After appearing before the Special Division of the Omani Police in Muscat for an investigation, he was arrested and released on the same day without his official documents (his passport and ID card), even though no charges were brought against him.

Muwatin's founder and editor-in-chief left Oman and settled in the United Kingdom as a political refugee in July 2015. The media network's journalists and writers were threatened and arrested, forcing the team to permanently cease the publishing of Muwatin on January 14, 2016.

Muwatin was officially back to publishing on 3 May 2017 on World Press Freedom Day after it was registered in London. However, on the same day the site was blocked in Oman, followed by the rest of the other Gulf countries, which led the team to take several measures to enable citizens in Oman and the Gulf region to browse the site in cooperation with Reporters Without Borders.

== Content and Sections ==
Muwatin monitors Arab society's events and is concerned with citizen issues in the Gulf region and the Arab world. It's an independent media institution, which publishes content in Arabic about a range of issues dealing with democracy, politics, civil and political rights, social and cultural rights, gender rights, sexuality and may others.

Muwatin represents one of the projects of free press in the Arab region. Citizenship, issues of rights and freedoms, and everything that is the Arab world is silent on, is the line of editing the network and its media projects. With the approach of analytical journalism, it tries to go beyond the red lines.

In addition to publishing more than a thousand different press articles since its launching, Muwatin has also published fifty one issues as a periodical magazine until now. In February 2016 Muwatin published its first book entitled: "Oman: The Challenges of the Present and Outcome of the Future". The book included a group of dialogues and articles on political and human rights issues related to internal affairs in Oman, and since its publication until now, the book is prohibited from circulating in Oman, but it is available online. In November 2020, the second printed book was published under the title: "Controlling Information ... A Study on the Regime and the Press in Oman".

Under the umbrella of Muwatin Network also there are four other programs: ‘Muwatin Center for Studies’, ‘Muwatin Center for Human right’, 'Boukachma' which is a satire program and ‘Muwatin Café’ in which it publishes conversations and podcasts.
